= List of Indian bands in Quebec =

This article presents a list of Indian bands in Quebec. It lists all Indian bands recognized by Indian and Northern Affairs Canada which the seat is located in the province of Quebec, Canada.

== List ==
Band number	Official name	Seat	Nation	Registered population (as of October 2016)	Tribal Council
74	Algonquins of Barriere Lake	Rapid Lake	Algonquins	790	Algonquin Nation Programs and Services Secretariat
79	Atikamekw d'Opitciwan	Obedjiwan	Atikamekw	2,937	Conseil de la Nation Atikamekw
85	Bande des Innus de Pessamit	Pessamit	Innus	3,948	Mamuitun Tribal Council
62	Communauté anicinape de Kitcisakik	Val-d'Or	Algonquins	493	Algonquin Anishinabeg Nation Tribal Council
55	Conseil de la Première Nation Abitibiwinni	Pikogan	Algonquins	1,054	Algonquin Anishinabeg Nation Tribal Council
77	Conseil des Atikamekw de Wemotaci	Wemotaci	Atikamekw	1,918	Conseil de la Nation Atikamekw
58	Cree Nation of Chisasibi	Chisasibi	Crees	4,585	Grand Council of the Crees
75	Cree Nation of Mistissini	Mistissini	Crees	3,964	Grand Council of the Crees
59	Cree Nation of Nemaska	Nemaska	Crees	781	Grand Council of the Crees
60	Cree Nation of Wemindji	Wemindji	Crees	1,589	Grand Council of the Crees
65	Eagle Village First Nation - Kipawa	Témiscaming	Algonquins	990	Algonquin Anishinabeg Nation Tribal Council
57	Eastmain	Eastmain	Crees	876	Grand Council of the Crees
80	Innu Takuaikan Uashat Mak Mani-Utenam	Sept-Îles	Innus	4,588	Mamuitun Tribal Council
86	Innue Essipit	Innue Essipit	Innus	741	Mamuitun Tribal Council
73	Kitigan Zibi Anishinabeg	Maniwaki	Algonquins	3,236	Algonquin Anishinabeg Nation Tribal Council
87	La Nation Innu Matimekush-Lac John	Schefferville	Innus	983	Mamuitun Tribal Council
53	La Nation Micmac de Gespeg	Gaspé (Fontenelle)	Mi'gmaq	776	Mi'gmawei Mawiomi Secretariat
78	Les Atikamekw de Manawan	Manawan	Atikamekw	2,892	Conseil de la Nation Atikamekw
82	Les Innus de Ekuanitshit	Ekuanitshit	Innus	632	Regroupement Mamit Innuat
51	Listuguj Mi'gmaq Government	Listuguj	Mi'gmaq	4,014	Mi'gmawei Mawiomi Secretariat
67	Long Point First Nation	Winneway	Algonquins	867	Algonquin Anishinabeg Nation Tribal Council
52	Micmacs of Gesgapegiag	Maria	Mi'gmaq	1,499	Mi'gmawei Mawiomi Secretariat
70	Mohawks of Kahnawá:ke	Kahnawake	Mohawks	10,946	
69	Mohawks of Kanesatake	Kanesatake	Mohawks	2,508	
83	Montagnais de Natashquan	Natashquan	Innus	1,110	Regroupement Mamit Innuat
88	Montagnais de Pakua Shipi	Saint-Augustin	Innus	364	Regroupement Mamit Innuat
84	Montagnais de Unamen Shipu	La Romaine	Innus	1,179	Regroupement Mamit Innuat
76	Montagnais du Lac St-Jean	Mashteuiatsh	Innus	6,601	Mamuitun Tribal Council
81	Naskapi Nation of Kawawachikamach	Kawawachikamach	Naskapis	773	
63	Nation Anishnabe du Lac Simon	Lac Simon	Algonquins	2,145	Algonquin Anishinabeg Nation Tribal Council
50	Nation Huronne Wendat	Wendake	Hurons-Wendat	4,035	
72	Odanak	Odanak	Abenakis	2,457	Grand Conseil de la Nation Waban-Aki
89	Oujé-Bougoumou Cree Nation	Oujé-Bougoumou	Crees	868	Grand Council of the Crees
54	Première Nation Malecite de Viger	Cacouna	Maliseets	1,183	
71	Première Nation des Abénakis de Wôlinak	Wôlinak	Abenakis	349	Grand Conseil de la Nation Waban-Aki
95	Première nation de Whapmagoostui	Whapmagoostui	Crees	978	Grand Council of the Crees
61	The Crees of the Waskaganish First Nation	Waskaganish	Crees	2,835	Grand Council of the Crees
64	Timiskaming First Nation	Notre-Dame-du-Nord	Algonquins	2,127	Algonquin Nation Programs and Services Secretariat
56	Waswanipi	Waswanipi	Crees	2,170	Grand Council of the Crees
68	Wolf Lake	Témiscaming	Algonquins	232	Algonquin Nation Programs and Services Secretariat

== See also ==
- Aboriginal peoples in Quebec
- Band government
- First Nations
