= List of Cree and Naskapi territories in Quebec =

This is a list of Cree and Naskapi territories in Quebec. It includes only Cree and Naskapi villages and village municipalities. All places with the exception of Kawawachikamach and Kawawachikamach (Naskapi village municipality) are in the territory of Eeyou Istchee.

Name as used by Indigenous and Northern Affairs Canada	First Nation(s)	Ethnic/national group	Area		Population			Notes & references
Name as used by Indigenous and Northern Affairs Canada	First Nation(s)	Ethnic/national group	ha	acre	2016	2011	% difference	Notes & references
Chisasibi (TC)	Cree Nation of Chisasibi	Cree	82,838.0	204,697.2	4,872	4,484	8.7%	Land reserved for the Cree (TC)
Chisasibi (VC)	Cree Nation of Chisasibi	Cree	49,164.0	121,486.9				Land reserved for the Cree (VC)
Eastmain (TC)	Eastmain	Cree	14,766.0	36,487.6	866	767	12.9%	Land reserved for the Cree (TC)
Eastmain (VC)	Eastmain	Cree	31,875.0	78,764.8				Land reserved for the Cree (VC)
Kawawachikamach (TK)	Naskapi Nation of Kawawachikamach	Naskapi	3,337.0	8,245.9	601	586	2.6%	Land reserved for the Naskapi (TK)
Kawawachikamach (VK)	Naskapi Nation of Kawawachikamach	Naskapi	24,209	59,821.7				Naskapi village municipality (VK)
Mistissini (TC)	Cree Nation of Mistissini	Cree	85,988.0	212,481.0	3,523	3,427	2.8%	Land reserved for the Cree (TC)
Mistissini (VC)	Cree Nation of Mistissini	Cree	50,740.0	125,381.3				Land reserved for the Cree (VC)
Nemaska (TC)	Cree Nation of Nemaska	Cree	9,849.0	24,337.4	760	712	6.7%	Land reserved for the Cree (TC)
Nemaska (VC)	Cree Nation of Nemaska	Cree	5,118.0	12,646.9				Land reserved for the Cree (VC)
Waskaganish (TC)	The Crees of the Waskaganish First Nation	Cree	50,226.0	124,111.1	2,196	2,206	-0.5%	Land reserved for the Cree (TC)
Waskaganish (VC)	The Crees of the Waskaganish First Nation	Cree	27,776.0	68,636.0				Land reserved for the Cree (VC)
Waswanipi (TC)	Waswanipi First Nation	Cree	41,985.0	103,747.2	1,759	1,777	-1.0%	Land reserved for the Cree (TC)
Waswanipi (VC)	Waswanipi First Nation	Cree	21,390.0	52,855.8				Land reserved for the Cree (VC)
Wemindji (TC)	Cree Nation of Wemindji	Cree	38,815.0	95,914.0	1,444	1,378	4.8%	Land reserved for the Cree (TC)
Wemindji (VC)	Cree Nation of Wemindji	Cree	16,446.0	40,639.0				Land reserved for the Cree (VC)
Whapmagoostui (TC)	Whapmagoostui First Nation	Cree	18,988.0	46,920.4	984	874	12.6%	Land reserved for the Cree (TC)
Whapmagoostui (VC)	Whapmagoostui First Nation	Cree	12,253.0	30,277.8				Land reserved for the Cree (VC)

== See also ==
- Indigenous peoples in Quebec
- List of Indian reserves in Quebec
- List of Indian settlements in Quebec
- List of northern villages and Inuit reserved lands in Quebec
