= Assembly of First Nations Quebec-Labrador =

- Abbreviation: AFNQL
- Formation: 1985
- Legal status: Active
- Headquarters: Wendake, Quebec
- Chief: Francis Verreault-Paul
- Website: apnql.com

The Assembly of First Nations Quebec-Labrador (French: Assemblée des Premières Nations Québec-Labrador, AFNQL) is a political organization representing the First Nations of Quebec and Labrador. It represents these First Nations to the Secrétariat aux affaires autochtones du Québec and to the ministry of Crown-Indigenous Relations and Northern Affairs of Canada. The AFNQL is composed of representatives from 43 communities in the Abenaki, Algonquin, Atikamekw, Cree, Maliseet, Mi'kmaq, Innu, Huron-Wendat and Naskapi nations, as well as from the Mohawks. The AFNQL does not represent the Inuit or any Inuit community; they are represented by Inuit Tapiriit Kanatami.

== Leadership ==
The AFNQL is composed of the chiefs of the 43 First Nations communities in Quebec. The Assembly elects one member to serve as chief for a term of three years.

The Assembly meets about four times a year to give mandates to its Bureau and to the Commissions it has set up. The AFNQL is attached to the Assembly of First Nations (AFN) whose office is located in Ottawa. The chief of the AFNQL is a member of the AFN executive and can be appointed as the bearer of national files (ex. international, education, health, finance, etc.).

Currently the chief is Francis Verreault-Paul from the community of Mashteuiatsh who was elected with 21 votes in a single round of voting in February 2025. Verreault-Paul is a former hockey player and played for the Chicoutimi Saguenéens in the QMJHL. Prior to being elected chief he served as chief of staff to long-serving chief Ghislain Picard.

Previously Ghislain Picard served as chief for 33 years from 1992-2025.

From its founding in 1985 to 1992 the elected chief of the Assembly was Konrad Sioui.

== Members ==
There are 43 communities that are members of the AFNQL.

=== Saint Lawrence Iroquians ===
Huron-Wendat

- Nation huronne Wendat

Mohawk

- Mohawks of Akwesasne
- Mohawks of Kahnawà:ke
- Mohawks of Kanesatake

=== Eastern Algonquians ===
Abenaki (Grand Council of the Waban-Aki Nation)

- Première Nation des Abénakis de Wôlinak
- Odanak

Malecite

- Wolastoqiyik Wahsipekuk First Nation

Mi'kmaq (Mi'gmawei Mawiomi Secretariat)

- Listuguj Miꞌgmaq First Nation
- Micmacs of Gesgapegiag
- Micmac Nation of Gespeg

=== Northern Algonquians ===
Atikamekw (Conseil de la Nation Atikamekw)

- Conseil des Atikamekw de Manawan
- Conseil des Atikamekw d’Opitciwan
- Conseil des Atikamekw de Wemotaci

Cree (Grand Council of the Crees)

- Cree Nation of Chisasibi
- Cree Nation of Eastmain
- Cree Nation of Nemaska
- Cree Nation of Mistissini
- Cree Nation of Oujé-Bougoumou
- Cree Nation of Waswanipi
- Cree Nation of Wemindji
- The Crees of the Waskaganish First Nation
- Cree Nation of Whapmagoostui

Naskapi

- Naskapi Nation of Kawawachikamach

Innu

- Natuashish and
- Sheshatshiu in Labrador
- (The Mamuitun Tribal Council and the Mamit Innuat Group in Quebec)
  - Conseil des Innus d'Ekuanitshit
  - Conseil des Innus de Essipit
  - Conseil des Innus de Matimekush-Lac John
  - Conseil des Innus de Pakuashipi
  - Conseil des Innus de Pessamit
  - Conseil des Innus de Nutashkuan
  - Montagnais of Unamen Shipu
  - Innu Takuaikan Uashat mak Mani-Utenam
  - Pekuakamiulnuatsh First Nation
- Mushuau Innu Band Council

=== Central Algonquians ===
(Tribal Council of the Anishinabeg Algonquin Nation and Secretariat of the programs and services of the Algonquin nation)

- Algonquins of Barriere Lake
- Conseil de la Première Nation Abitibiwinni
- Conseil des anicinape de Kitcisakik
- Kebaowek First Nation
- Kitigan Zibi Anishinabeg
- Long Point First Nation
- Anishnabe Nation of Lac Simon
- First Nation of Timiskaming
- First Nation of Wolf Lake

== See also ==
- Assembly of First Nations
- Inuit Tapiriit Kanatami
