= Indigenous peoples in Quebec =

Indigenous groups in Quebec, CA

Indigenous peoples in Quebec (Canadian French: peuples autochtones du Québec) total eleven distinct ethnic groups. According to the 2021 census, the one Inuit community and ten First Nations communities number 205,010 people and account for approximately slightly over two percent of the population of Quebec, Canada.

== Overview ==
The indigenous people of Quebec are typically divided into three cultural groupings: The Inuit who live in the far north, the Iroquois who reside alongside the Saint Lawrence River valley area and the Algonquians who live within the boreal forest region of the province. The indigenous people consist of one Inuit and ten First Nation groups that mainly inhabit 54 distinct communities across Quebec.

== First Nations ==
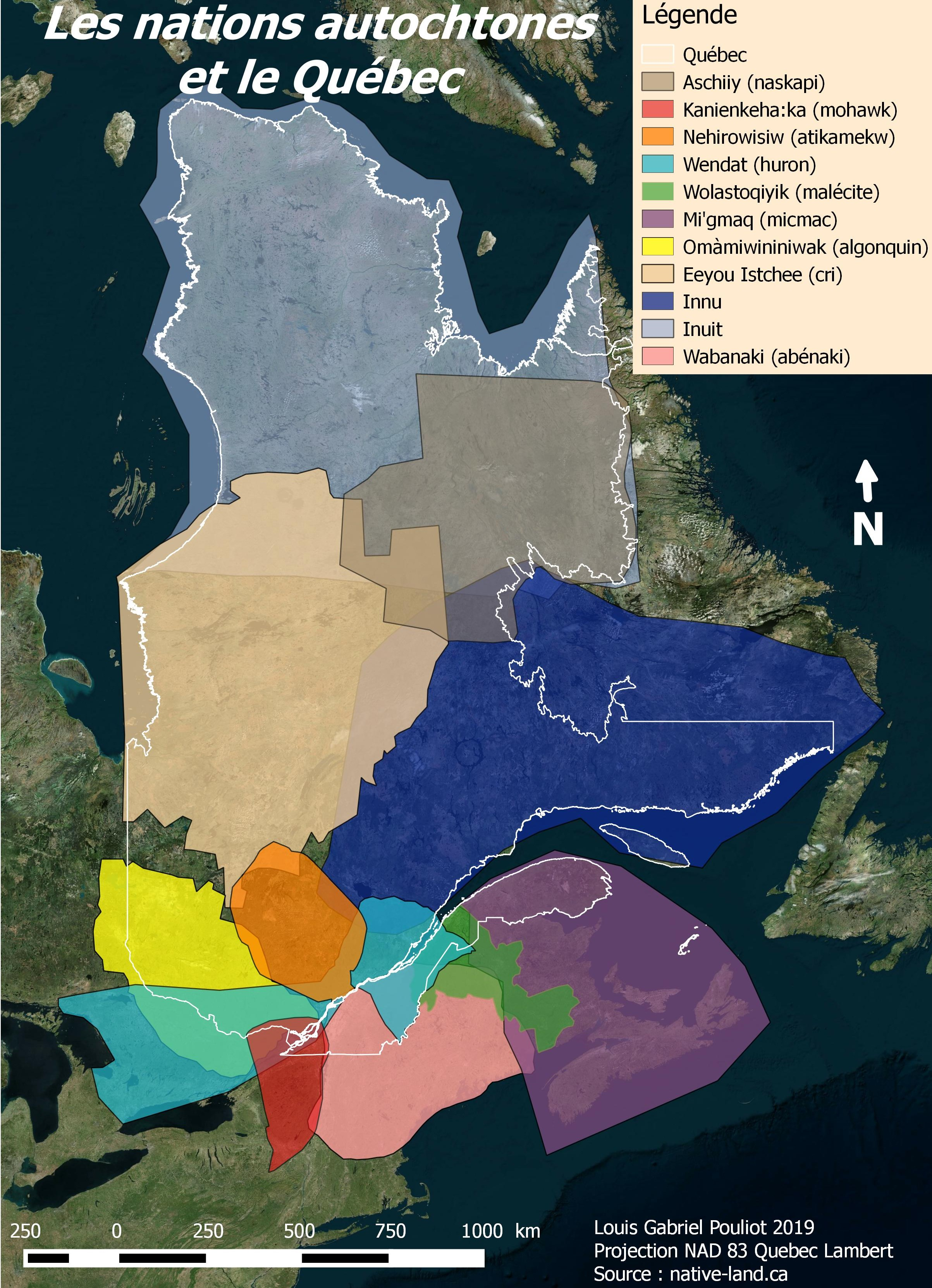
Indigenous peoples in Quebec

=== Algonquian ===
==== Abenaki ====
The Abenaki comprise two First Nations communities named the Odanak First Nation (in Odanak, near Sorel) and the Wolinak First Nation (in Wôlinak, near Trois-Rivières). They are approximately 1,900 people on the two reserves.

==== Anishinaabeg ====
The Algonquin, who refer to themselves as Anishinaabeg, comprise nine First Nations who live in communities located in the Outaouais and Abitibi-Témiscamingue regions of Quebec. These First Nations communities are:

- Abitibiwinni First Nation in Pikogan
- Algonquins of Barriere Lake in Lac-Rapide
- Kebaowek First Nation (Eagle Village First Nation - Kipawa) in Kebaowek
- Kitcisakik First Nation (Kitcisakik Anicinape Community) in Kitcisakik
- Kitigan Zibi Anishinabeg in Kitigan Zibi
- Long Point First Nation in Winneway
- Nation Anishinaabe du Lac Simon in Lac-Simon
- Timiskaming First Nation
- Wolf Lake First Nation in Hunter's Point

The Algonquin number approximately 12,000 people.

==== Atikamekw ====
The three Atikamekw (sometimes spelled Atikamek) bands live in four communities located in the Mauricie region of Quebec. These First Nations are:

- Atikamekw of Opitciwan in Obedjiwan
- Atikamekw of Manawan in Manawan
- Wemotaci Atikamekw Council in Wemotaci and Coucoucache Indian Reserve No. 24

The Atikamek number approximately 4,900 people.

==== Cree ====
The Cree are the most populous nation in the Algonquian-language family. The majority live in Quebec and Ontario, but Cree also live in Manitoba, Alberta, and Saskatchewan. There are 10 Cree First Nations communities in northern Quebec. They are the:

- Cree Nation of Chisasibi in Chisasibi
- Cree Nation of Eastmain in Eastmain
- Cree Nation of Mistissini in Mistissini
- Cree Nation of Nemaska in Nemaska
- Oujé-Bougoumou Cree Nation in Oujé-Bougoumou
- The Crees of the Waskaganish First Nation in Waskaganish
- Cree Nation of Waswanipi in Waswanipi
- Cree Nation of Wemindji in Wemindji
- Cree Nation of Whapmagoostui in Whapmagoostui
- Washaw Sibi Eeyou in Amos

The Cree of Quebec number approximately 25,000 people.

==== Mi'kmaq ====
The Mi'kmaq (or Micmac, in an older English spelling) live in the Canadian Maritime provinces and the Quebec region of the Gaspé Peninsula (French: Gaspésie). In Quebec, they number approximately 4,300 people and comprise three First Nations communities:

- Gaspe First Nation in Gaspé
- Gesgapegiag First Nation in Gesgapegiag
- Listuguj Miꞌgmaq First Nation in Listuguj

==== Innu ====
The Innu (formerly referred to as the Montagnais) comprise nine First Nations in the Côte-Nord region of Quebec. These First Nations are:

- Pessamit Innu Band (also known as bande des Innus de Pessamit or Betsiamites First Nation) in Pessamit
- Innu Nation of Matimekush-Lac John (also known as La Nation Innu Matimekush-Lac John) in Lac-John and Matimekosh
- Innue Essipit (known also as Essipit First Nation, or Montagnais Essipit) in Essipit
- Innu Takuaikan Uashat Mak Mani-Utenam in Maliotenam and Uashat
- Innus of Ekuanitshit (also known as Les Innus d'Ekuanitshit in Mingan
- Pekuakamiulnuatsh First Nation (also known as Première nation des Pekuakamiulnuatsh, Montagnais du Lac St.-Jean, or Ilnuatsh du Pekuakami) in Mashteuiatsh
- Première Nation des Innus de Nutashkuan (also known as Montagnais de Natashquan, Montagnais of Natashquan or Nutashkuan Innu First Nation) in Nutashkuan
- Montagnais de Pakua Shipi in Pakuashipi
- Montagnais de Unamen Shipu in La Romaine

The Innu number approximately 18,000 people.

==== Naskapi ====
The Naskapi live in northern Quebec. They comprise one First Nation, the Naskapi Nation of Kawawachikamach, based in Kawawachikamach. They number approximately 1,000 people.Throughout the 20th Century, the Naskapi were displaced and removed from their land multiple times by Canadian government and Church authorities.

The Naskapi are recognized as a distinct nation by the governments of Quebec and Canada; however, they are often considered to be Innu living in a remote area.

Their main language is Naskapi and their second language is English. The Naskapi committee is known as the NLMB (The Naskapi Local Management Board).

==== Wolastoqiyik ====
The Wolastoqiyik (French: Malécite, Maliseet in an older English spelling) in Quebec comprise one First Nation, the Wolastoqiyik Wahsipekuk (Viger) First Nation, whose members live in two communities located in the Bas-Saint-Laurent region of Quebec. The communities are Cacouna and Kataskomiq. They number approximately 570 people.

=== Iroquoian ===
==== Wendat ====
The Wendat people, members of the Wendat Nation, live in Wendake, a reserve enclosed within Quebec City. Their original homeland was in Ontario. They number about 2,800 people. Their original language was Wendat, in the Iroquoian-language family.

==== Mohawk ====
The Mohawk of Quebec number approximately 13,000 people. They comprise the three following First Nations, which were established at these locations in the colonial period:

- Mohawks of Kahnawà:ke in Kahnawake and Doncaster
- Mohawks of Kanesatake in Kanesatake
- Mohawk Nation of Akwesasne in Akwesasne

== Inuit ==
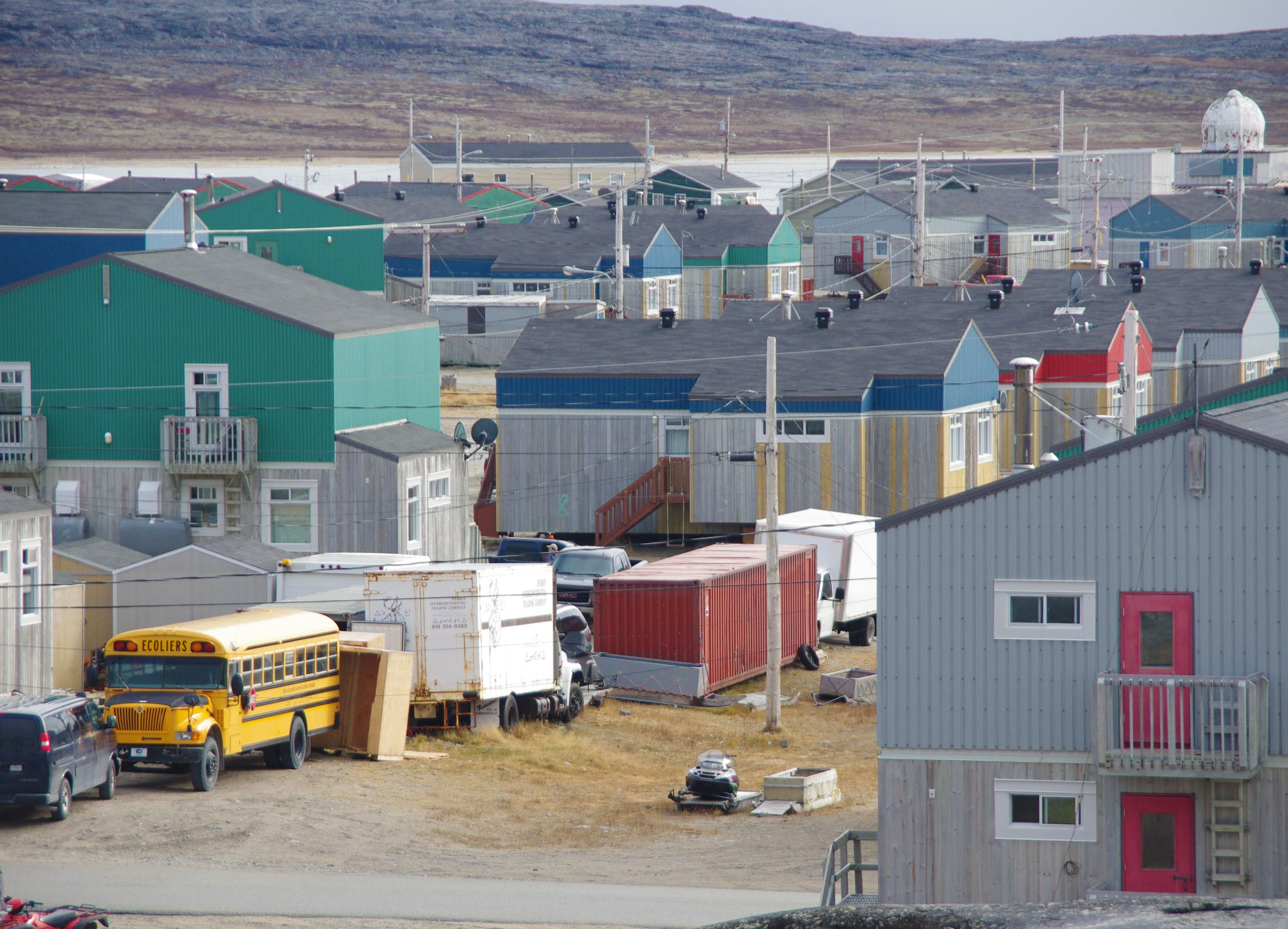
The northern village of Inukjuak in Nunavik

Inuit are Indigenous Canadian peoples who were isolated from Europeans longer than other indigenous groups. This is because they live in a cold and remote part of the world called Inuit Nunangat, the large territory encompassing all Inuit regions in Canada. Nunavik, the Quebec part of Inuit Nunangat, is where all of Quebec's northern village municipalities (Municipalité de village nordique, abbreviated as VN are located and the residents are almost all Inuit and are known as Nunavimmiut .

There are 14 Inuit northern villages, all of which are coastal and regulated by the Kativik Regional Government:

- Akulivik
- Aupaluk
- Inukjuak
- Ivujivik
- Kangiqsualujjuaq
- Kangirsuk
- Kuujjuaq
- Kuujjuarapik
- Puvirnituq
- Quaqtaq
- Salluit

In 2015, Quebec's Inuit numbered 12,129 people. As of 2023, 98% of Nunavik's residents speak Nunavimmiutitut, a local dialect of Inuktitut and part of the Eskaleut language family, as their native language. They also know English and French because they are taught these languages in school.

== Demographics ==
=== Knowledge of language ===
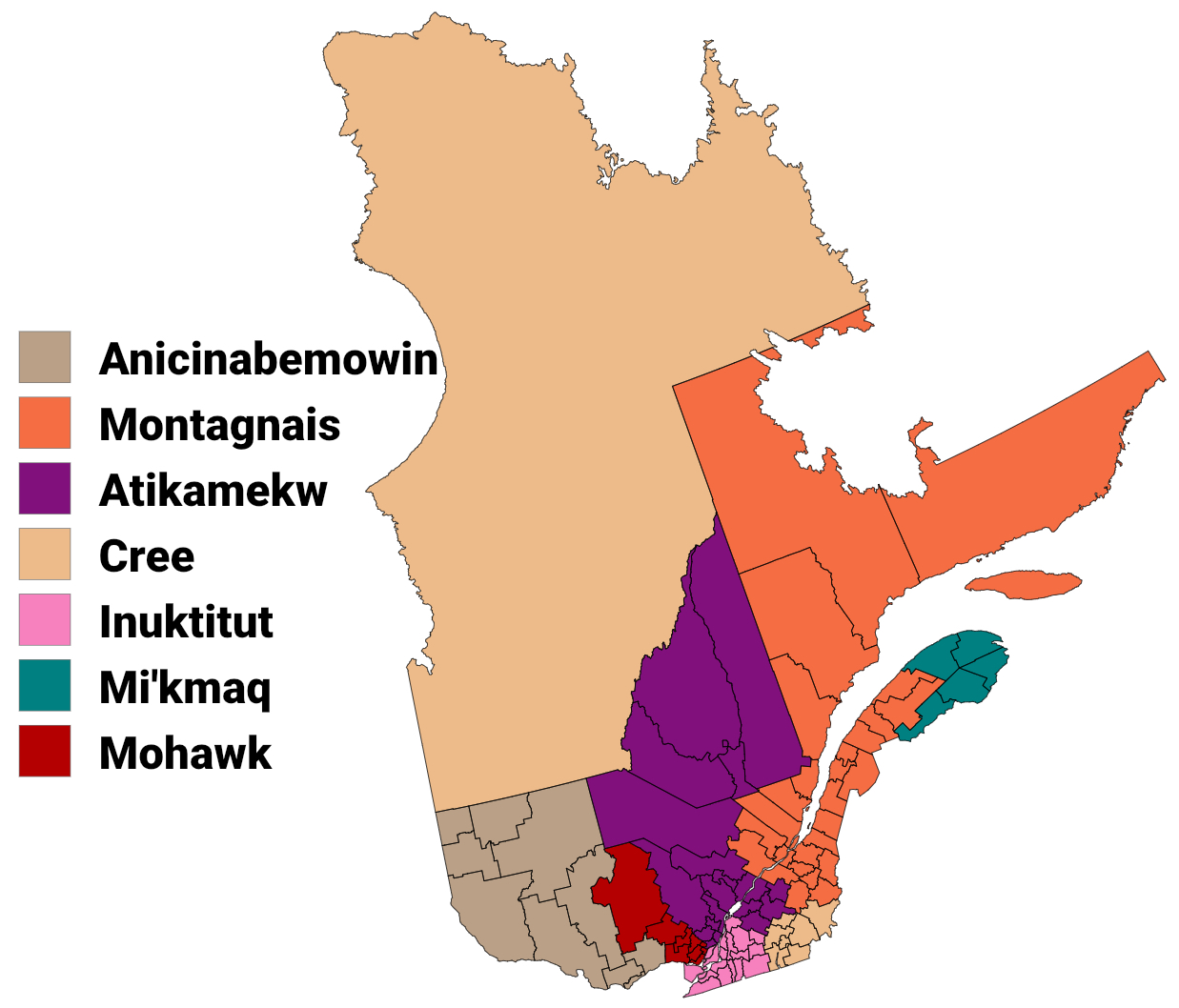
Largest Indigenous knowledge of language in Quebec, 2021 census

== Recognized rights ==
- James Bay and Northern Quebec Agreement
- Charter of the French Language
- Constitution of Canada
  - Constitution Act, 1982
  - Indigenous land claims in Canada
  - Indigenous specific land claims in Canada
  - Aboriginal land title in Canada
  - Canadian Aboriginal law
  - Canadian Indigenous law
  - Monarchy of Canada and the Indigenous peoples of Canada
- United Nations conventions, covenants, and treaties
  - Declaration on the Rights of Indigenous Peoples (received royal assent on June 21, 2021)
- Treaty of 1752
- Murray Treaty of Longueuil (1760)
- Royal Proclamation of 1763
- Jay Treaty (1794)

== See also ==
- Native Friendship Centre of Montreal
- Demographics of Quebec
- Language demographics of Quebec
- Indigenous languages of the Americas
- Indigenous peoples of the Americas
- Indigenous peoples of the Subarctic
- List of northern villages and Inuit reserved lands in Quebec
- Métis
