= Cree Hunters Economic Security Board =

Quebec indigenous aid board

The Cree Hunters Economic Security Board (CHESB) is a bipartisan organization co-directed by the Quebec Government and the Cree Nation Government having as its primary objective the perpetuation of the traditional Cree lifestyle, based on wildlife harvesting activities, by offering guaranteed income to Cree hunters and trappers in Quebec. The board runs the Economic Security Program for Cree Hunters.

It takes its origin from the James Bay and Northern Quebec Agreement (JBNQA), signed on November 11th, 1975, and was put in place in November 1976. In 2022, the program which the board oversees had a budget of around 30 million dollars. The program is available to all Cree beneficiaries of the JBNQA. It covers harvesting activities such as hunting and trapping, as well as perimeter activities such as fabrication and fixing of supplies and tools, land preparation, wildlife management, transportation, and creation and commercialization of products and crafts.

Originally named "Cree Hunters and Trappers Income Security Board", its name was changed to its current one in 2020. Its head office is in Quebec City.

== The board ==
The board was created from section 30 of JBNQA. The "Act respecting the Cree hunters economic security board" is the law which regulates it. It has six members, three of whom are appointed by the Quebec government and three by the Cree Nation Government. As of 2021-2022, the board employs 16 people, 11 of whom serve within the Cree communities, the five remaining work at the head office in Quebec City. The following ten communities are served by the program: Chisasibi, Eastmain, Mistissini, Nemaska, Oujé-Bougoumou, Waskaganish, Waswanipi, Wemindji, Whapmagoostui and Washaw-Sibi.

== The program ==
The mission of the board is to run the economic security program for Cree hunters, and in so encourage the conservation and perpetuation of the traditional lifestyle by providing a financial support to beneficiaries who engage in the lifestyle. The board aims to ensure these activities remain possible despite changes in the social, economic and natural environment of those who practice harvesting activities.

The program provides income and other benefits to Crees who choose harvesting activities (hunting, trapping and fishing) as a way of life. Benefits are calculated according to, among other things, the number of days spent practicing eligible activities, and other sources of income.

=== Eligible activities ===
Eligible activities include harvesting activities such as hunting, trapping, and fishing (commercial fishing is excluded), but also secondary activities like the maintenance and fabrication of harvesting supplies and equipment, gathering of wild plants, wildlife and trapline management, transportation to and from harvesting sites and camps, and fabrication, processing and marketing of crafts and products of harvesting.
