= List of Indian settlements in Quebec =

This is the list of communities in Quebec that have the legal status of Indian settlements (établissement amérindien, code=SE) as defined by Statistics Canada.

Note these are not the same as Indian reserves (réserve indien, code=IRI), nor does it include Cree villages (code=VC), Naskapi villages (code=VK), or Northern villages (Inuit, code=VN), which have a separate legal status.

== Indian settlements ==
Name as used by Indigenous and Northern Affairs Canada	First Nation(s)	Ethnic/national group	Tribal council	Treaty	Area		Population			Notes & references
Name as used by Indigenous and Northern Affairs Canada	First Nation(s)	Ethnic/national group	Tribal council	Treaty	ha	acre	2016	2011	% difference	Notes & references
Grand-Lac Victoria Indian Settlement	Kitcisakik Anicinape Community	Algonquin	Algonquin Anishinabeg Nation Tribal Council	n/a	108.0	266.9	274	339	-19.2%	Indian settlement
Hunter's Point	Wolf Lake First Nation	Algonquin	Algonquin Nation Programs and Services Secretariat	n/a	122.0	301.5	10	27	-63.0%	Indian settlement not listed at INAC
Kanesatake Lands	Mohawks of Kanesatake	Mohawk		n/a	1,198.0	2,960.3				Indian settlement
Oujé-Bougoumou	Oujé-Bougoumou Cree Nation	Cree		n/a	266.0	657.3	737	725	1.7%	Listed as an Indian settlement by Statistics Canada
St-Augustin Indian Settlement	Montagnais de Pakua Shipi	Innu	Regroupement Mamit Innuat	n/a	393.0	971.1	237	312	-24.0%	Indian settlement
Whitworth	Première Nation Malécite de Viger	Maliseet		n/a	169.0	417.6				Not listed by INAC or in the census
Winneway Indian Settlement	Long Point First Nation	Anishinaabe	Algonquin Anishinabeg Nation Tribal Council	n/a	36.8	90.9	104	219	-52.5%	Indian settlement

Note: Oujé-Bougoumou is a village and is inhabited by Cree, but does not have the legal status of "Cree village" as defined by legislation.

== See also ==
- Indigenous peoples in Quebec
- List of Indian reserves in Quebec
- List of northern villages and Inuit reserved lands in Quebec
- List of Cree and Naskapi territories in Quebec
