= Flags of the Indigenous nations of Canada =

The following are flags used by Indigenous nations of Canada.

== First Nations ==
=== Anishinaabe ===
Flag	Date	Use	Description	Designer	Copyright status
	1970s–present	Flag of the Anishinaabek	A black pictographic thunderbird on a white field	Nicholas R. Deleary	Copyrighted
	2010–present	Flag of the Temagami First Nation of Ojibwe	A blue and a brown block, with a symbol.	unknown	unknown

=== Atikamekw ===
Flag	Date	Use	Description	Designer	Copyright status
	Unknown–present	Simplified flag of the Atikamekw	Three canoes, representing the Wemotaci, Manawan & Opitciwan, share a common direction. The red represents the blood they share. The green on the canoes represents the forests of their territory.	Jacques Newashish	unknown

=== Blackfoot ===
Flag	Date	Use	Description	Designer	Copyright status
	Unknown–present	Flag of the Blackfoot Confederacy		Blood Tribe Grandfather Aatso’towa (Andy Black Water). The collaborative design of collective thought also included esteemed Blackfoot Grandparents and Knowledge Holders	
	Unknown–present	Flag of Kainai Nation			
	Unknown–present	Flag of Piikani Nation			
	1990–present	Flag of Siksika Nation	Red background. Siksika coat of arms in the centre, Union Jack in upper left.	Mark Wolfleg Jr	

=== Cree ===
Flag	Date	Use	Description	Designer	Copyright status
	Unknown–present	Flag of Beaver Lake Cree Nation, Alberta			
	Unknown–present	Flag of Bigstone Cree Nation, Alberta			
	Unknown–present	Flag of Cree Nation of Wemindji, Quebec			
	Unknown–present	Flag of Cree Nation of Nemaska, Quebec			
	Unknown–present	Flag of the Driftpile First Nation, Alberta			
	Unknown–present	Flag of Enoch Cree Nation, Alberta			
	Unknown–present	Flag of Fisher River Cree Nation, Manitoba			
	Unknown–present	Flag of James Smith Cree Nation, Saskatchewan			
	Unknown–present	Flag of the Kapawe'no First Nation, Alberta			
	Unknown–present	Flag of Kitchenuhmaykoosib Inninuwug First Nation, Ontario			
	Unknown–present	Flag of Mikisew Cree First Nation, Northwest Territories			
	Unknown–present	Flag of Neskantaga First Nation, Ontario			
	Unknown–present	Flag of the Nishnawbe Aski Nation, Ontario			
	Unknown–present	Flag of Nisichawayasihk Cree Nation, Manitoba			
	Unknown–present	Flag of Oujé-Bougoumou Cree Nation, Quebec			
	1983–present	Flag of Peguis First Nation, Manitoba	Three horizontal stripes of yellow, green, and blue; representing the sun shining, grass growing, and water flowing. There is a red circle in the middle, red representing the Peguis people and the circle for life.	Freda Bear	Public domain (under threshold of originality in Canada)
	Unknown–present	Flag of the Peepeekisis Cree Nation, Saskatchewan			
	Unknown–present	Flag of Pimicikamak Cree Nation, Manitoba			
	Unknown–present	Flag of Piapot First Nation, Saskatchewan			Public domain (under threshold of originality in Canada)
	Unknown–present	Flag of Red Earth First Nation, Saskatchewan			
	Unknown–present	Flag of Sapotaweyak Cree Nation, Manitoba			

=== Dene ===
Flag	Date	Use	Description	Designer	Copyright status
	2005–present	Flag of the Tłı̨chǫ Government	Flag representing the Tłı̨chǫ. It is a dark blue flag with a thin, horizontally-centered white wavy stripe that overlaps the bottom of a yellow sun disc. There is background-color fimbriation showing where these meet; four red teepees with white fimbriation and poles are set in a row on the bottom half, with a yellow upright five-pointed star on the upper fly of the flag.	James Wah-Shee	Copyrighted (2017–)
	–present	Flag of the Gwichʼin			
	Unknown–present	Flag of the Tahltan Nation	Flag of Tahltan Kolīne representing the two clans: Crow (or Tseskʼiya) and Wolf (or Chʼioyone)		
	2012–present	Flag of Deisleen Ḵwáan, Lingít Aaní	Horizontally striped, red-white-red, 1–3–1, with five totems or emblems in the centre, from left to right: Kùkhhittàn (Raven Children), Ishklitàn (Frog), Yanyèdi (Wolf), Sèshitàn (Beaver), Dakhlʼawèdi (Eagle)		

=== Haida ===
Flag	Date	Use	Description	Designer	Copyright status
	1981–present	Flag of the Haida Nation	A red field with an eagle and raven headed bird, surrounded by a circlet, charged in the centre	G̲uud San Glans	Presumably copyrighted

=== Haudenosaunee ===
Flag	Date	Use	Description	Designer	Copyright status
	1980s–present	Flag of the Haudenosaunee Confederacy	A mauve field party per fess by a band of white squares joined and a stylized white "Tree of Peace" charged in the centre; design is adapted from the Hiawatha wampum belt, each element represents an original nation in the confederacy	Rick Hill, Harold Johnson, and Tim Johnson	Public domain (is derivative of the Hiawatha wampum, which is public domain given its age)

=== Innu ===
Flag	Date	Use	Description	Designer	Copyright status
	Unknown–present	Flag of the Innu Nation	Horizontal bands of teal, white and light blue, within the blue sits a centre snowshoe flanked by reindeer skulls on both sides		
	Unknown–present	Flag of the Matimekush Band	A vertical tricolour triband of chartreuse, white, green with the coat of arms of the Matimekush Lac John Band charged in the Canadian pale		

=== Kutenai ===
Flag	Date	Use	Description	Designer	Copyright status
	2005–present	Flag of the Ktunaxa Nation	Flag features a golden feathered staff on a brown field		

=== Mikmaq ===
Flag	Date	Use	Description	Designer	Copyright status
	October 4, 1900-present	Flag of the Mi'kmaq Nation Grand Council	A white field with a red Latin cross and a red star and moon in the left quadrants; white denotes purity of creation, the red cross represents mankind and infinity, the sun and moon the forces of day and night, the flag is meant to be displayed hanging vertically as shown here	Rev. Father Pacifique Buisson	Public domain
	Mid-1980s–present	Flag of the Natuaqanek Band	A red field with yellow left and right borders, a quartered roundel charged in the centre	Philip Young	?

=== Salish ===
Flag	Date	Use	Description	Designer	Copyright status
	Unknown–present	Flag of the Secwepemc Nation	Flag features 17 feathers representing the 17 bands in the Secwépemc Nation. The feathers are mostly black, with a white portion in the middle. The white portion signifies those communities which were wiped out by disease and other trauma following contact		
	2019–present	Flag of the Musqueam people	A white Canadian pale on a teal field, with an arrowhead in the centre depicting a salmon leaping above a net	Susan Point	Presumed Copyrighted
	1980–present	Flag of the Nlaka'pamux Nation	Circle wreath of Nlaka'pamux pictographs set on a grey field		
	Unknown–present	Flag of the Nuxalk Nation			
	2014–present	Flag of the Shíshálh	A white background with a bird charged in the middle.		
	Unknown–present	Flag of the Stʼatʼimc			

=== Siouxian ===
Flag	Date	Use	Description	Designer	Copyright status
	Unknown–present	Flag of Ĩyãħé Nakón Mąkóce (Stoney Nakoda)	Stoney Nakoda flag		

=== Tsimshian and Nass–Gitksan ===
Flag	Date	Use	Description	Designer	Copyright status
	Unknown–present	Flag of the Haisla people			
	2001–present	Flag of the Nisg̱aʼa Nation	A vertical tricolour triband of black, white, and sanguine with the badge of the Nisga'a Nation, surrounded by black and sanguine ovals, charged in the Canadian pale	Lloyd McDames and Peter McKay	?

=== Wendat ===
Flag	Date	Use	Description	Designer	Copyright status
	Unknown–present	Flag of the Wendat Nation	White background with wampum belt pattern along upper and lower border. Wendat Nation badge in the center.	Grand Chief Konrad Sioui	?

== Inuit ==
Flag	Date	Use	Description	Designer	Copyright status
	2005–present	Flag of Nunatsiavut	A white field with a white, green, and blue inukshuk charged in the centre		
	2018–present	Flag of NunatuKavut	The flag features an ulu, a traditional Inuit knife used by women. Within the ulu image is a dog sled team, showing the importance of husky dogs, as well as a kudlik, a traditional seal oil lamp	Barry Pardy	Copyrighted
	unofficial	Flag of Nunavik		Thomassie Mangiok	
	Unknown–present	Flag of Inuvialuit	A gyrfalcon	Government of Canada (1984)	noncommercial use?

== Métis ==
Flag	Date	Use	Description	Designer	Copyright status
	Pre-1816–present	Flag of the Métis Nation of Canada	A blue field with a white symbol of infinity charged in the centre	Unknown	Public domain (given year of creation)
	Pre-1816–present	Flag of the Métis Nation (Red Variant)	A red field with a white symbol of infinity charged in the centre	Unknown	Public domain (given year of creation)
