= Oujé-Bougoumou (Cree village municipality) =

Oujé-Bougoumou ᐆᒉᐳᑯᒨ
- Cree village municipality
- Location within Quebec
- Coordinates: 49°55′N 74°49′W
- Country: Canada
- Province: Quebec
- Region: Nord-du-Québec
- TE: Eeyou Istchee
- Constituted: May 17, 2023

Government
  - Mayor: Gaston Cooper
  - Federal riding: Abitibi—Baie-James—Nunavik—Eeyou
  - Prov. riding: Ungava

Area
  - Total: 67.0 km^{2} (25.9 sq mi)
  - Land: 65.41 km^{2} (25.25 sq mi)

Population (2021)
  - Total: 0
  - Density: 0/km^{2} (0/sq mi)
  - Change (2016–21): N/A
  - Dwellings: 0
- Time zone: UTC−05:00 (EST)
  - Summer (DST): UTC−04:00 (EDT)
- Postal code(s): G0W 1C0
- Area codes: 418 and 581

Oujé-Bougoumou (French pronunciation: [uʒe buɡumu]; Cree: ᐆᒉᐳᑯᒨ / Ûcêpukumû) is a Cree village municipality in the territory of Eeyou Istchee in northern Quebec, Canada.
