= Ghislain Picard =

Innu politician and activist

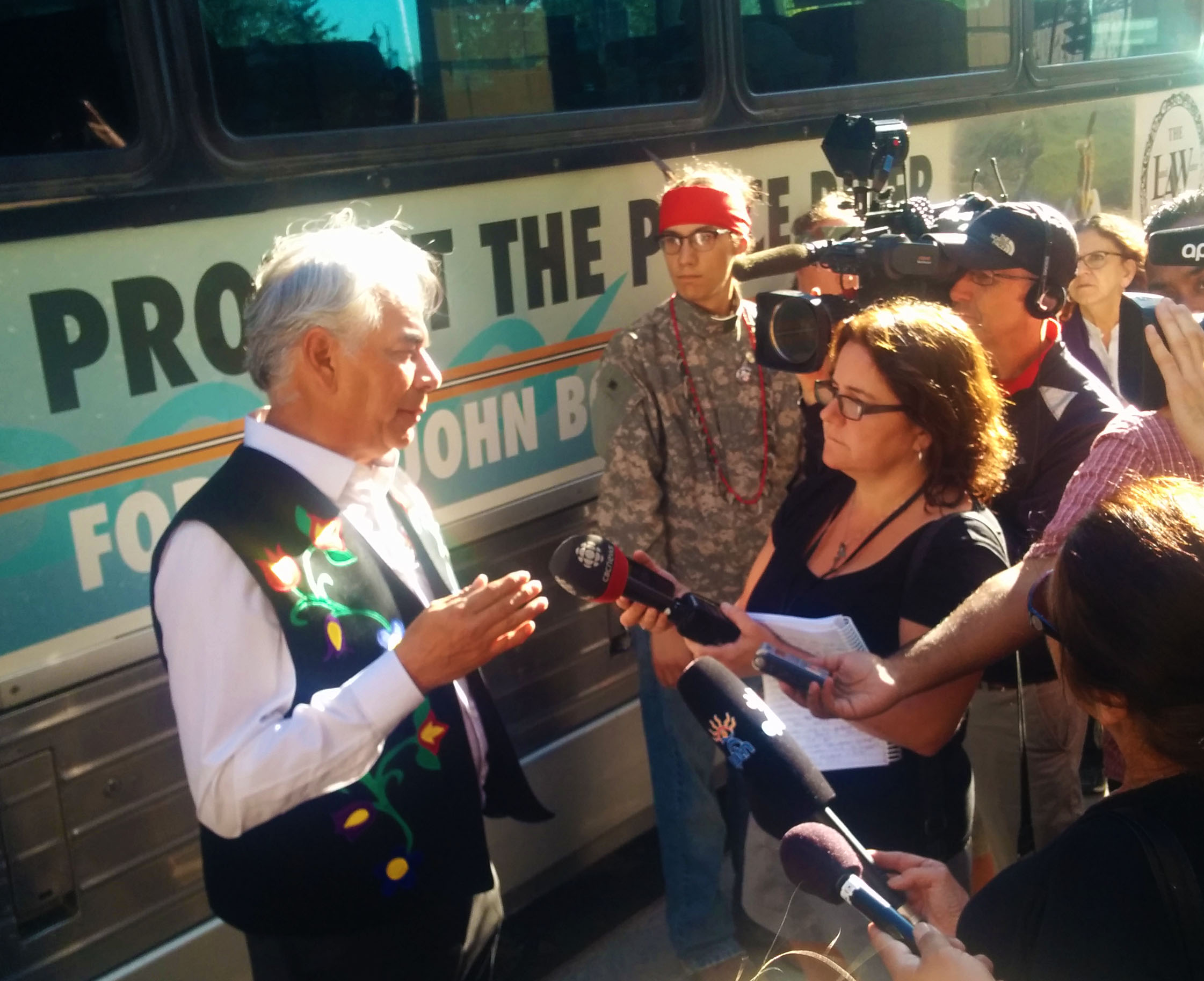

Chief of the Assembly of First Nations Quebec-Labrador
- In office 1992–2025

Interim Chief of the Assembly of First Nations
- In office 2014

Personal details
- Born: 1955 (age 70–71) Pessamit, Quebec, Canada
- Awards: Knight of the National Order of Quebec

Ghislain Picard is an Innu politician and activist, and is a former Chief of the Assembly of First Nations Quebec-Labrador from 1992 to 2025. He speaks French, English and Innu.

== Biography ==
Picard was born in Pessamit, an Innu community in the Côte-Nord region of Quebec on the North shore of the St. Lawrence River.

He had a brief stint in the federal public service in 1978 before receiving an offer from the Council of the Atikamekw and Montagnais where he held various communications roles until 1983.

In 1983 he co-founded the Société de communication atikamekw-montagnais, an Indigenous radio broadcasting organisation.

In 1989, he was elected vice president of the Council of the Atikamekw and Montagnais.

Picard was first elected regional chief of the Assembly of First Nations for the Quebec and Labrador regions in January 1992 and was quickly thrust into negotiations of the Charlottetown Accord.

He co-authoured the book De Kebec à Québec : cinq siècles d'échanges entre nous in collaboration with Denis Bouchard and Éric Cardinal about Quebec's historical relationship with indigenous people.

In 2014 Picard served briefly as interim chief of the Assembly of First Nations.

He also wrote the preface to the biography of Quebec politician Manon Massé in 2018.

Picard has been an outspoken critic of the Francois Legault government for their refusal to acknowledge the existence of systemic racism in Quebec and their ignorance to Indigenous issues.

In the fall of 2023 it was announced that Picard would be joining Concordia University as an expert-in-residence for a period of two years and would also be co-teaching a graduate course in the MA in Public Policy and Public Administration program (MPPPA).

In December 2024 he announced that he would not seek reelection for another mandate as Chief of the AFNQL citing a desire to leave it to the next generation and go out on his own terms and to relax and spend time with his family. He was replaced as chief by his chief of staff Francis Verreault-Paul of Mashteuiatsh.

== Awards ==
- Named a Citizen of Honour of the City of Montréal in 2017.
- Appointed as a Knight to the National Order of Quebec in 2003.
- Earned the second prize for the president of the National Assembly's award for the book De Kebec à Québec : cinq siècles d'échanges entre nous in 2009.
- Awarded the Medal of the National Assembly in 2009.

== Publications ==
- Denis Bouchard, Éric Cardinal et Ghislain Picard (2008). De Kebec à Québec (in French). Montréal: Les Intouchables. p. 205. ISBN 978-2-89549-318-1.
- Pierre Trudel; Ghislain Picard (2009). Ghislain Picard (in French). Montréal: Boréal. p. 200. ISBN 978-2-7646-0647-6.
- Massé, Manon (22 May 2018). Parler vrai. Écosocieté. ISBN 9782897194192.
- Picard, Ghislain (26 September 2018). "Non, les Autochtones ne sont pas des Amérindiens". HuffPost.

== Notes ==
Council of the Atikamekw and Montagnais was the first permanent group representing First Nations in Quebec

== See also ==
- Assembly of First Nations Quebec-Labrador
- Pessamit Innu Band
