= Cree Nation of Chisasibi =

Coordinates: 53°47′0″N 78°54′0″W

Cree Nation of Chisasibi Band No. 58
- People: Cree
- Headquarters: Chisasibi (Cree village municipality)
- Province: Quebec

Land
- Main reserve: Chisasibi (Cree reserved land)

Tribal Council
- Grand Council of the Crees

Website
- Chisasibi.org

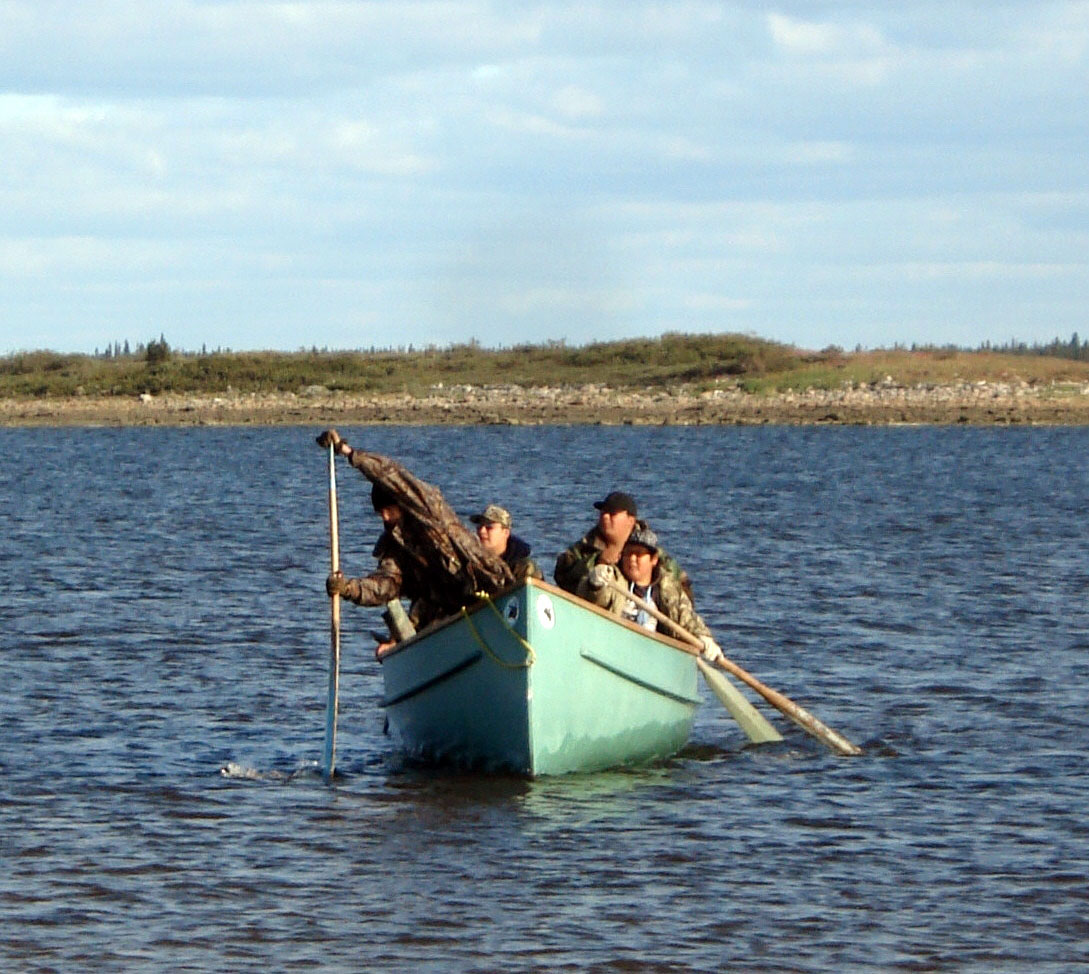
Chisasibi Cree in 2006

The Cree Nation of Chisasibi is a Cree First Nation in Quebec, Canada. It is headquartered at the Cree village of Chisasibi in the Eeyou Istchee territory in Northern Quebec. The nation also has a terre réservée crie or Cree reserved land of the same name covering 776 square kilometres (300 sq mi) around the village. As of November 2016, the Nation is in negotiation with the government of Canada to obtain its self-governance. As of 2016, it has a registered population of 4,585 members.
