= Chisasibi =

Chisasibi ᒋᓵᓰᐲ chisaasiipii
- Terre réservée crie (Cree reserved land)
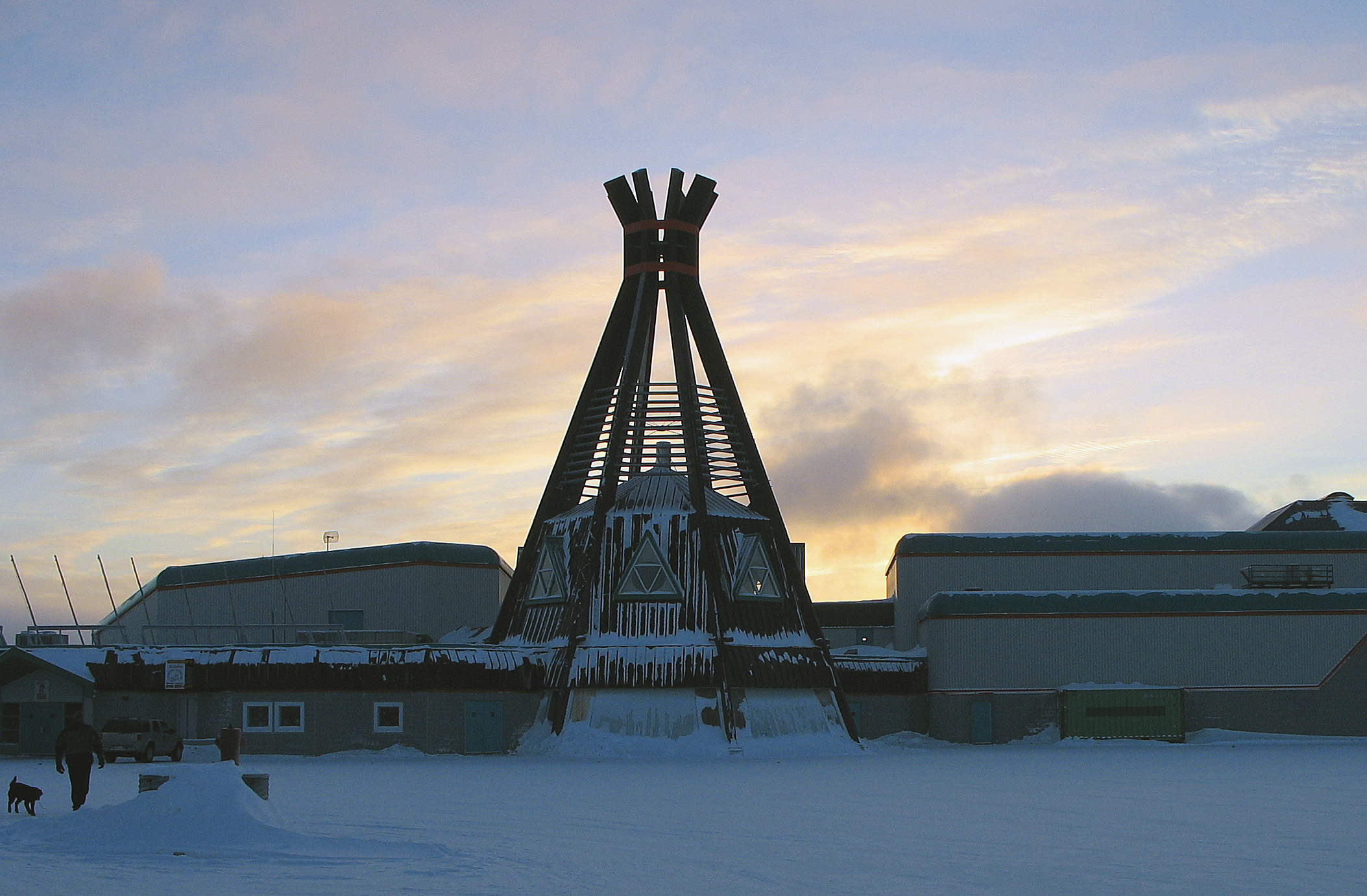

- Location within Quebec
- Coordinates: 53°47′N 78°54′W
- Country: Canada
- Province: Quebec
- Region: Nord-du-Québec
- TE: Eeyou Istchee
- Established: 1980

Government
  - Type: Cree reserved land (TC)
  - Chief: Daisy House

Area (2021)
  - Land: 825.11 km^{2} (318.58 sq mi)

Population (2021)
  - Total: 4,985
  - Density: 6/km^{2} (16/sq mi)
- Time zone: UTC– 05:00 (EST)
  - Summer (DST): UTC– 04:00 (EDT)
- Postal Code: J0M 1E0
- Area code: 819
- Website: chisasibi.ca

Chisasibi (Cree: ᒋᓵᓰᐲ, romanized: Cisâsîpî; meaning Great River) is a village and Cree reserved land (TC) on the eastern shore of James Bay, in Eeyou Istchee, an equivalent territory (ET) in Nord-du-Québec, Canada. It is situated on the south shore of La Grande River (the Grand River), less than 10 km (6.2 mi) from the river's mouth. Chisasibi is one of nine Cree villages in the region, and is a member of the Grand Council of the Crees of Quebec.

The territory surrounding Chisasibi is part of the municipality Eeyou Istchee James Bay, of which parts are jointly managed by the municipalities of the Jamésie TE and the Cree Regional Authority of the Eeyou Istchee TE.

The land area of the town is 491.63 km^{2} (189.82 sq mi) and the area of the associated Chisasibi Cree village municipality is 825.11 km^{2} (318.58 sq mi).

== History ==
The Cree have lived in the region for many centuries but were nomadic. In 1803, the Hudson's Bay Company founded Fort George, a trading post on the north shore which was relocated to the largest island at the mouth of La Grande River in 1837. Fort George became a permanent village as the local Cree population abandoned their nomadic way of life in the early 20th century and settled nearby. In 1940, its population was about 750 and grew to almost 2,000 in 1980.

In the mid-1970s, the construction of the James Bay hydro-electric project began, diverting upstream rivers into the La Grande watershed, increasing its flow significantly, resulting in erosion of Fort George Island (also called Governor's Island) and disruption to the formation of a solid ice cover in winter. In response, the Quebec Government built a new community on the mainland's south shore, relocating the population and some 200 houses to the new site in 1981. The village was renamed Chisasibi (official name: Cree Nation of Chisasibi). At the same time, the Fort George Relocation Corporation was formed to oversee the relocation.

== Geography ==
Chisasibi is the most northern Cree village accessible by road and the northernmost community with year-round road access in eastern North America. A 90 km (56 mi) paved road, running from Radisson and parallel to La Grande River, connects Chisasibi to the James Bay Road (also known as the Billy Diamond Highway, French: Route de la Baie James). The James Bay Road (formerly part of Route 109) was built from 1971 to 1974 as part of the James Bay hydroelectric project and connects Matagami to Radisson. Chisasibi Airport is located 1.7 nautical miles (3.1 km; 2.0 mi) northwest of the village and Air Creebec operates scheduled service from this airport. Though this is the most northern village, this is not where the road ends. From La Grande-1 generating station (LG-1), the road continues north to a location called Longue Pointe (Long Point). It is the farthest north one can go by road east of the Hudson Bay.

Many Cree in Chisasibi engage in hunting, trapping, and fishing activities, but all catch is for local consumption. Other economic activity includes local services (health care and education), employment by Hydro-Québec and some hospitality services. An elected Chief, Deputy Chief, and Council help administer the Cree Nation of Chisasibi Office.

Other Cree villages near Chisasibi are Whapmagoostui, 200 km (120 mi) to the north in Nunavik, on the eastern shore of Hudson Bay near the Northern village of Kuujjuarapik, and Wemindji, about 100 km (62 mi) to the south.

=== Climate ===
Chisasibi has a subarctic climate (Köppen Dfc), typical of the central latitudes of Quebec, with cold and snowy winters and mild, rainy summers.

Climate data for Chisasibi, Quebec (1915–1969)
Month	Jan	Feb	Mar	Apr	May	Jun	Jul	Aug	Sep	Oct	Nov	Dec	Year
Mean daily maximum °C (°F)	−17.5 (0.5)	−15.6 (3.9)	−9.1 (15.6)	−0.1 (31.8)	7.1 (44.8)	14.1 (57.4)	17.4 (63.3)	15.9 (60.6)	11.7 (53.1)	5.5 (41.9)	−1.8 (28.8)	−10.8 (12.6)	0.6 (33.1)
Daily mean °C (°F)	−23.3 (−9.9)	−22.0 (−7.6)	−15.8 (3.6)	−5.7 (21.7)	2.3 (36.1)	8.8 (47.8)	12.3 (54.1)	11.5 (52.7)	7.9 (46.2)	2.5 (36.5)	−4.8 (23.4)	−15.2 (4.6)	−4.3 (24.3)
Mean daily minimum °C (°F)	−29.0 (−20.2)	−28.2 (−18.8)	−22.4 (−8.3)	−11.0 (12.2)	−2.6 (27.3)	3.3 (37.9)	7.1 (44.8)	7.1 (44.8)	4.2 (39.6)	−0.3 (31.5)	−7.7 (18.1)	−19.6 (−3.3)	−9.2 (15.4)
Average precipitation mm (inches)	25.1 (0.99)	21.4 (0.84)	26.0 (1.02)	20.7 (0.81)	32.7 (1.29)	45.7 (1.80)	77.3 (3.04)	66.2 (2.61)	64.9 (2.56)	66.4 (2.61)	63.1 (2.48)	46.2 (1.82)	585.8 (23.06)
Source: worldclimate.com

== Demographics ==
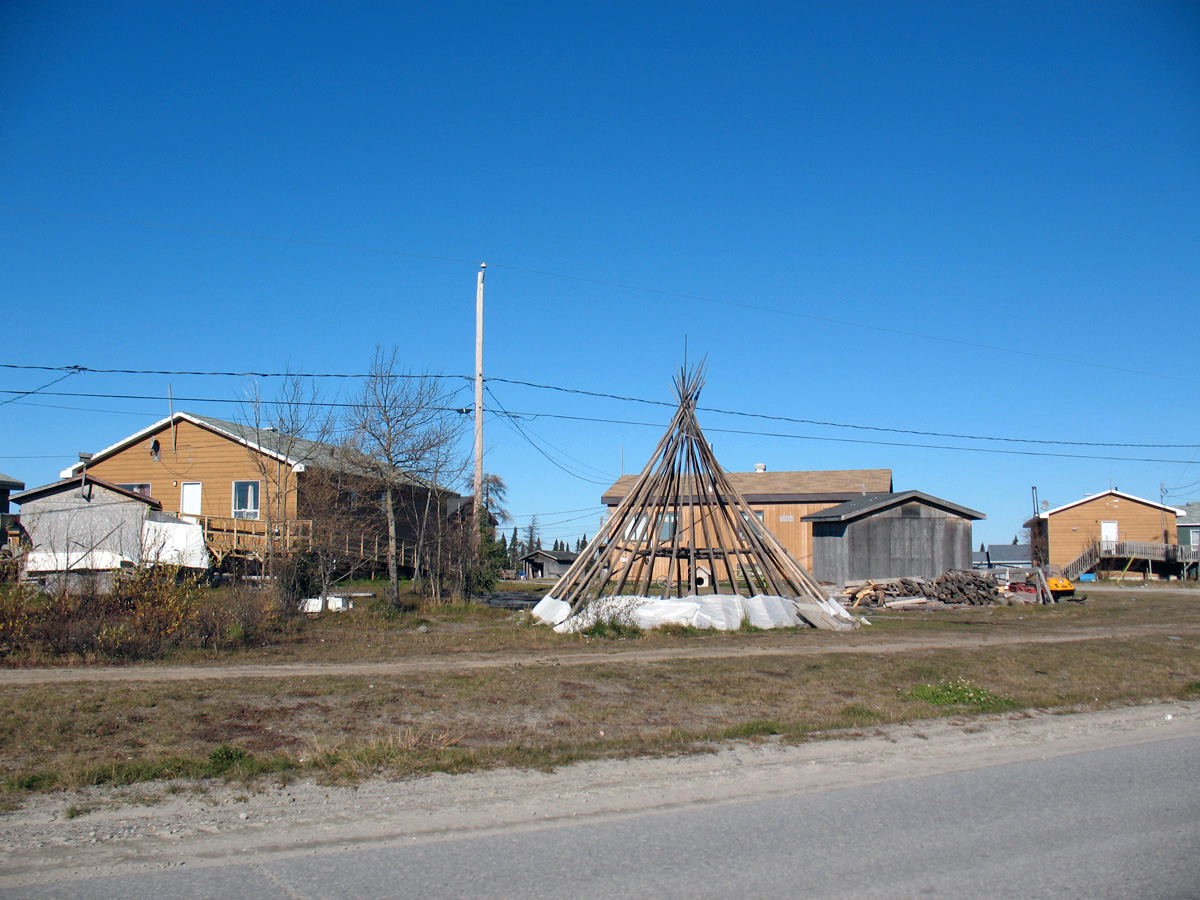
Homes and teepee

In the 2021 Canadian census conducted by Statistics Canada, Chisasibi had a population of 4,985 living in 1,056 of its 1,281 total private dwellings an increase of 2.3% from its 2016 population of 4,872. With a land area of 480.29 km^{2} (185.44 sq mi), it had a population density of 6.0/km^{2} (15.6/sq mi) in 2021.

As of the 2021 census the population of Chisasibi comprises 4,305 Cree, 345 other First Nations, 240 Inuit, 10 Métis, and 245 non-native people. The average age is 30.0 with 29.6 for men and 30.5 for women. The majority of the population is between 15 and 64 years old (61.5 per cent), 31.1 per cent are under 15 and 7.8 per cent are 65 and older.

Population growth
Year	Pop.	±%
1981	2,222	—
1986	2,373	+6.8%
1991	2,306	−2.8%
1996	3,251	+41.0%
2001	3,467	+6.6%
2006	3,972	+14.6%
2011	4,484	+12.9%
2016	4,872	+8.7%
2021	4,985	+2.3%
Source: Statistics Canada Community Profiles

=== Languages ===
Cree is spoken as the first language in Chisasibi, in addition to English, as a primary language for official dealings.

The mother tongue of the majority of the residents is Cree at 81.3 per cent, with 6.6 per cent for other indigenous languages. For Canada's official languages, English is the mother tongue for 8.4 per cent and French for 2.9 per cent of the population. In addition 0.7 per cent report a non-Indigenous language as their mother tongue

Around 76,4 per cent of the population speak English, with 3.5 per cent speaking French, 15.7 per cent speaking both English and French, and 4.4 per cent speaking neither.

There has been criticism of the Quebec language policy with respect to native languages, particularly Cree, many related to Hydro-Québec's hydroelectric dam project in the James Bay region.

== Education ==
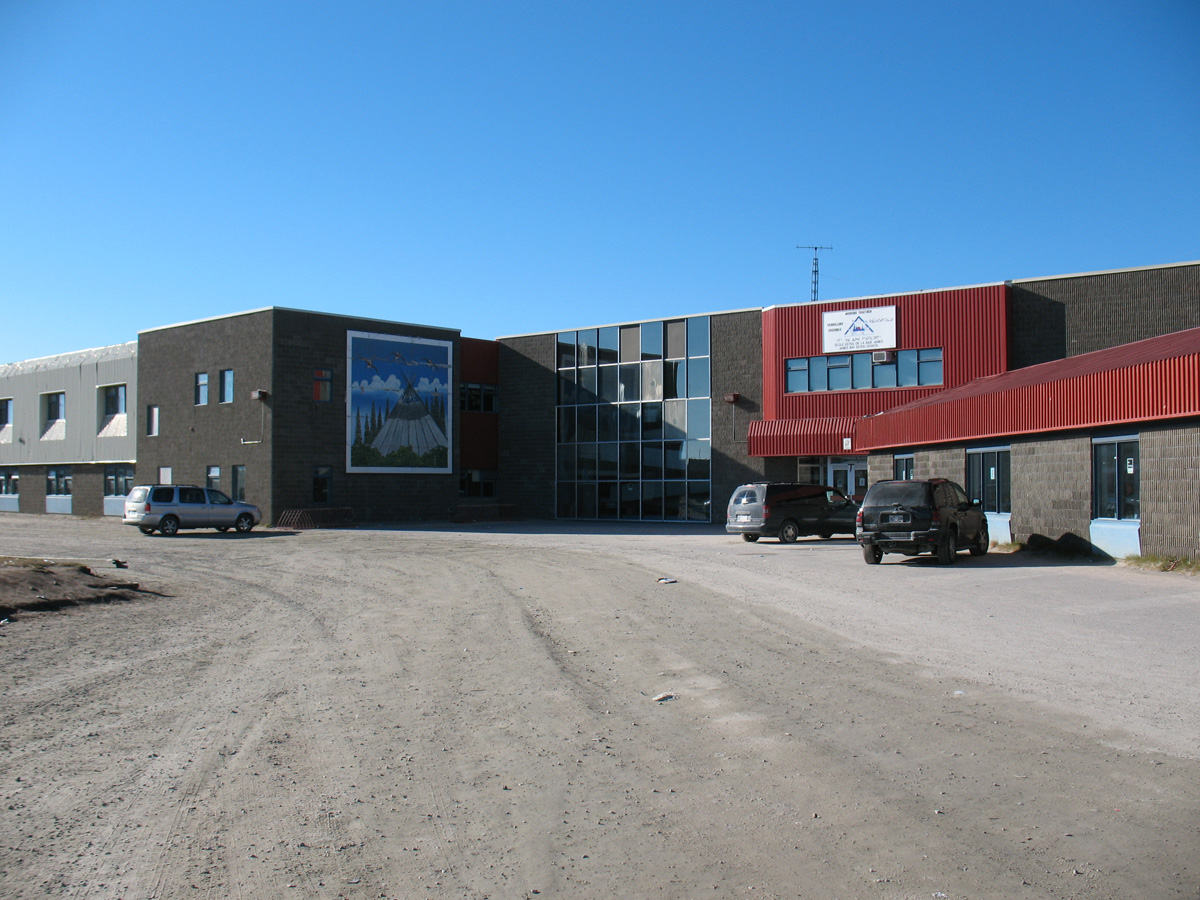
James Bay Eeyou School, a high school

The Cree School Board operates Waapinichikush Elementary School (with 788 students) and the James Bay Eeyou School, a high school, which has 494 students French: École Eeyou De La Baie James; Cree: ᒉᐃᒥᔅ ᐯᐃ ᐄᔨᔨᐤ ᒋᔅᑯᑎᒫᒑᐅᑭᒥᒄ). The Eeyou School opened in 1980.

Previously, the school provided boarding services for high schoolers from further afield of the James Bay region, such as Eastmain, Whapmagoostui, and Wemindji, as (at the time) all high school classes in the region were located in Chisasibi.

In addition, adult education is available in Chisasibi, including vocational and general education.

== Gallery ==
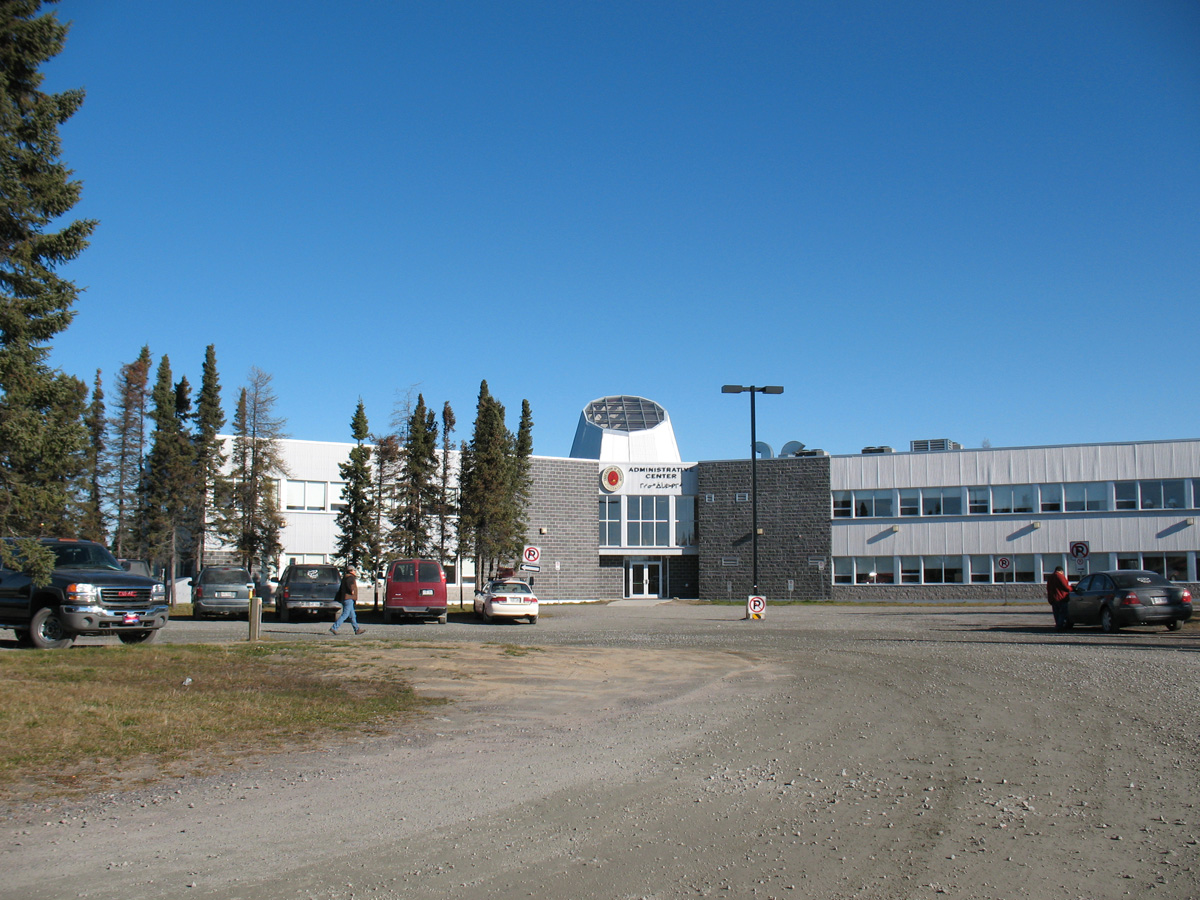
Administrative Centre

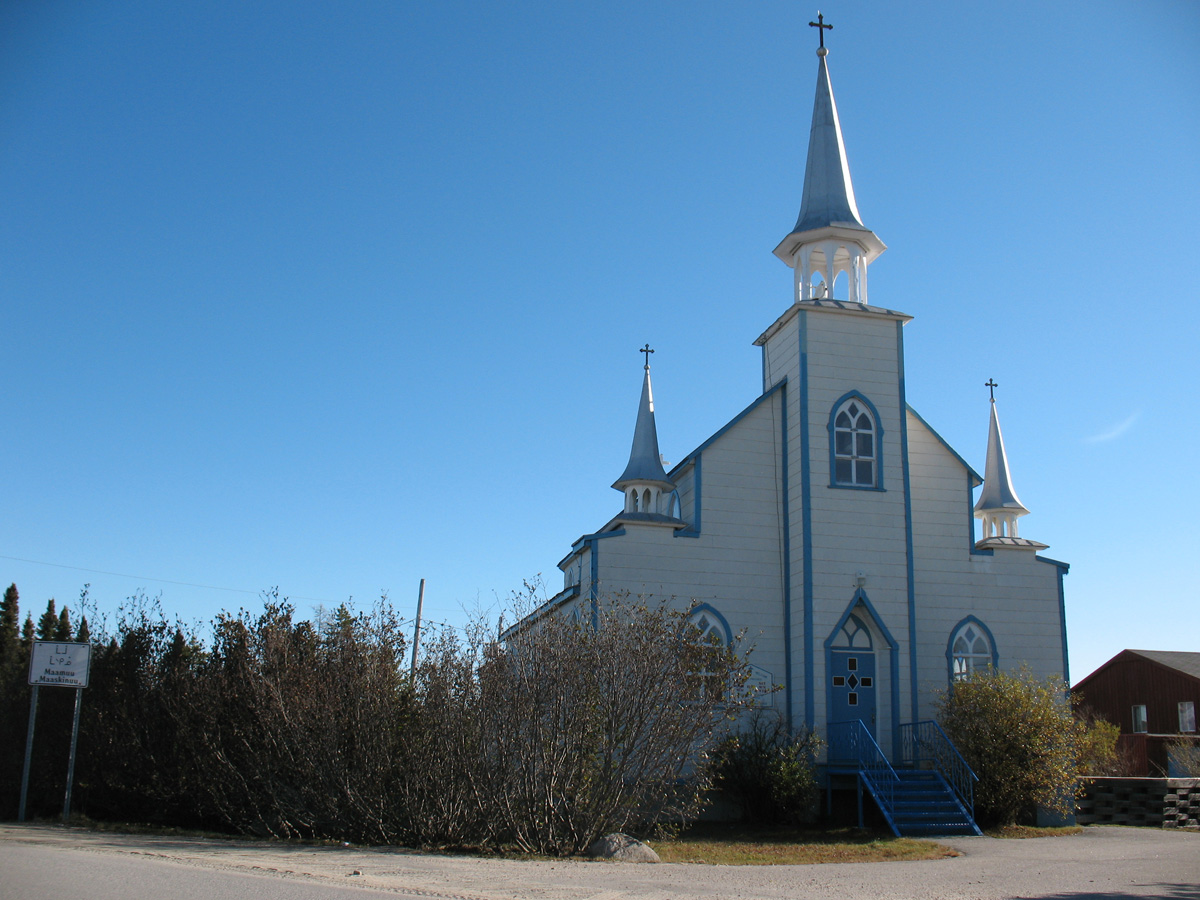
Catholic Church

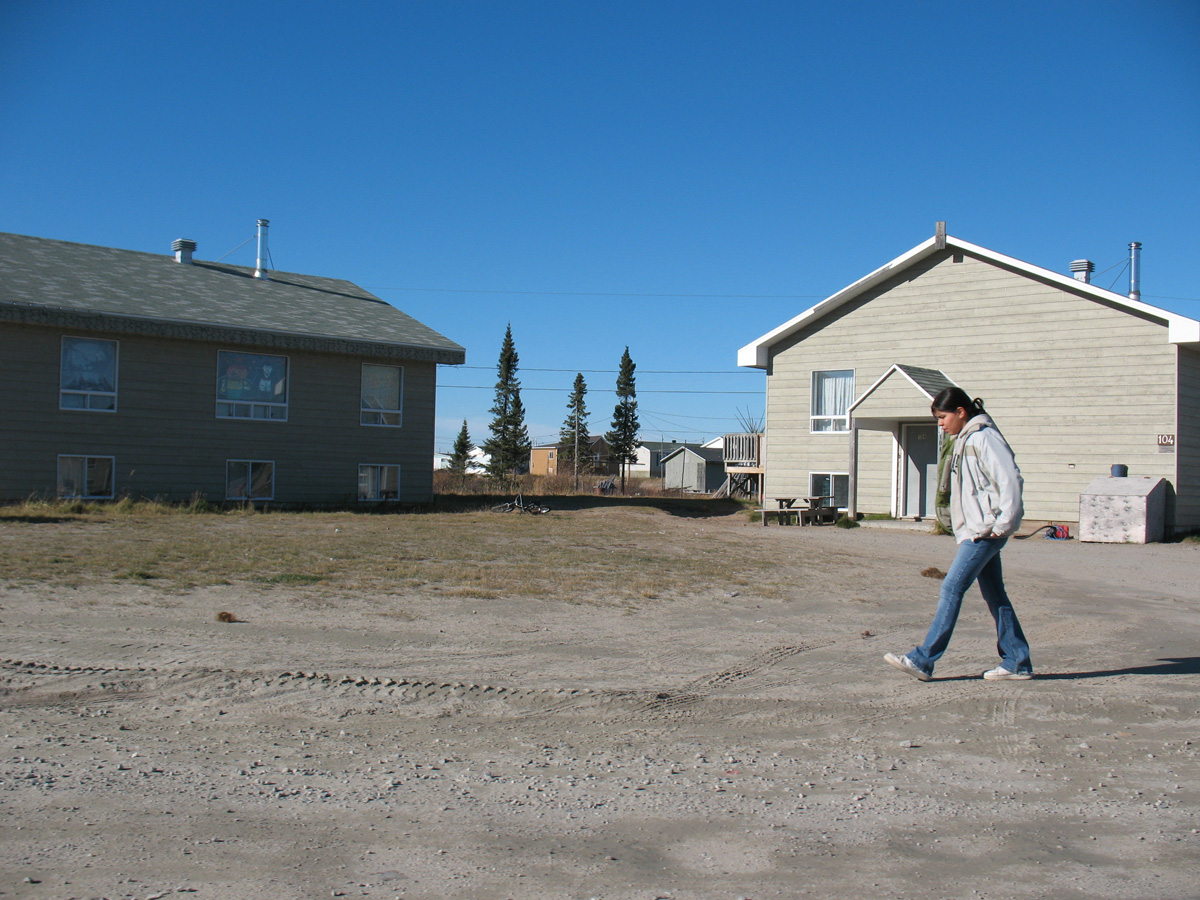
A Cree girl in Chisasibi

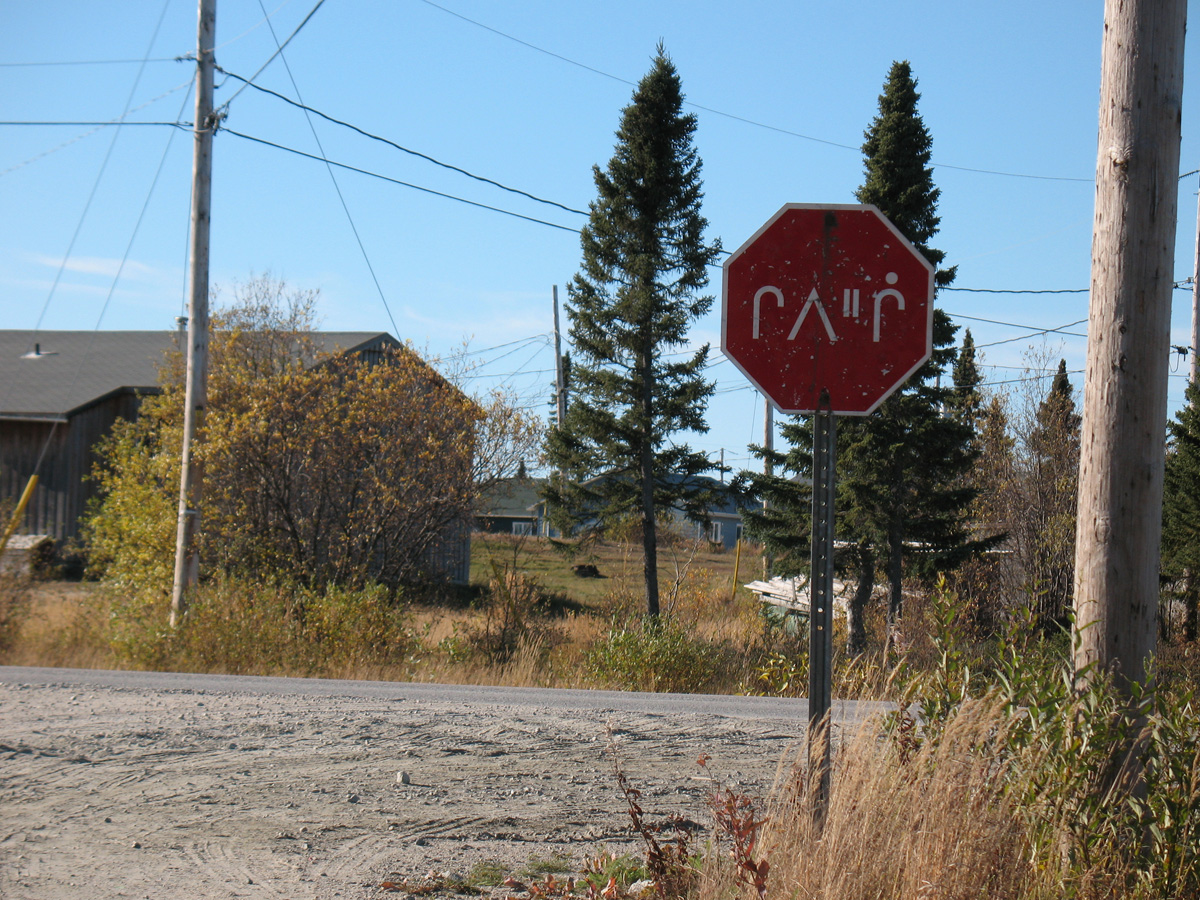
A stop sign, written in Cree

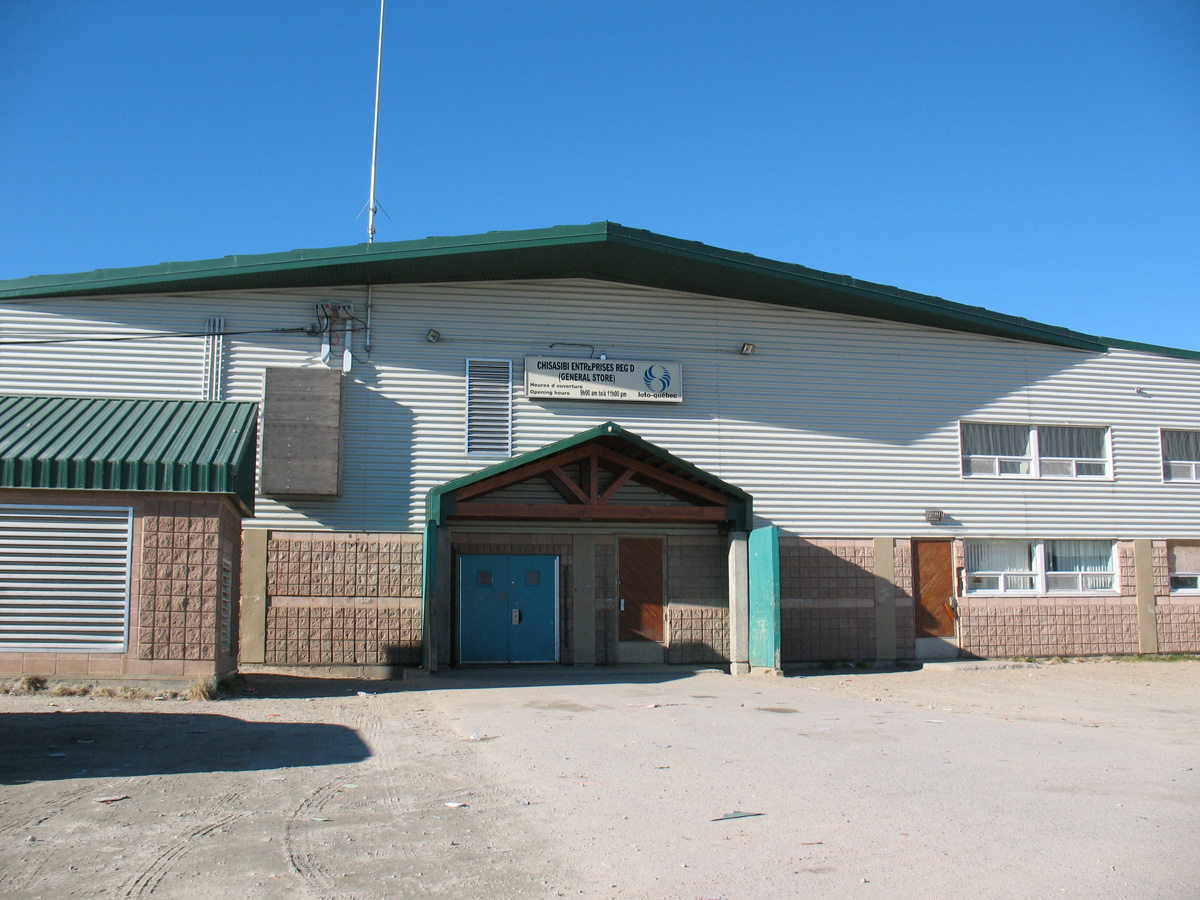
Chisasibi General Store

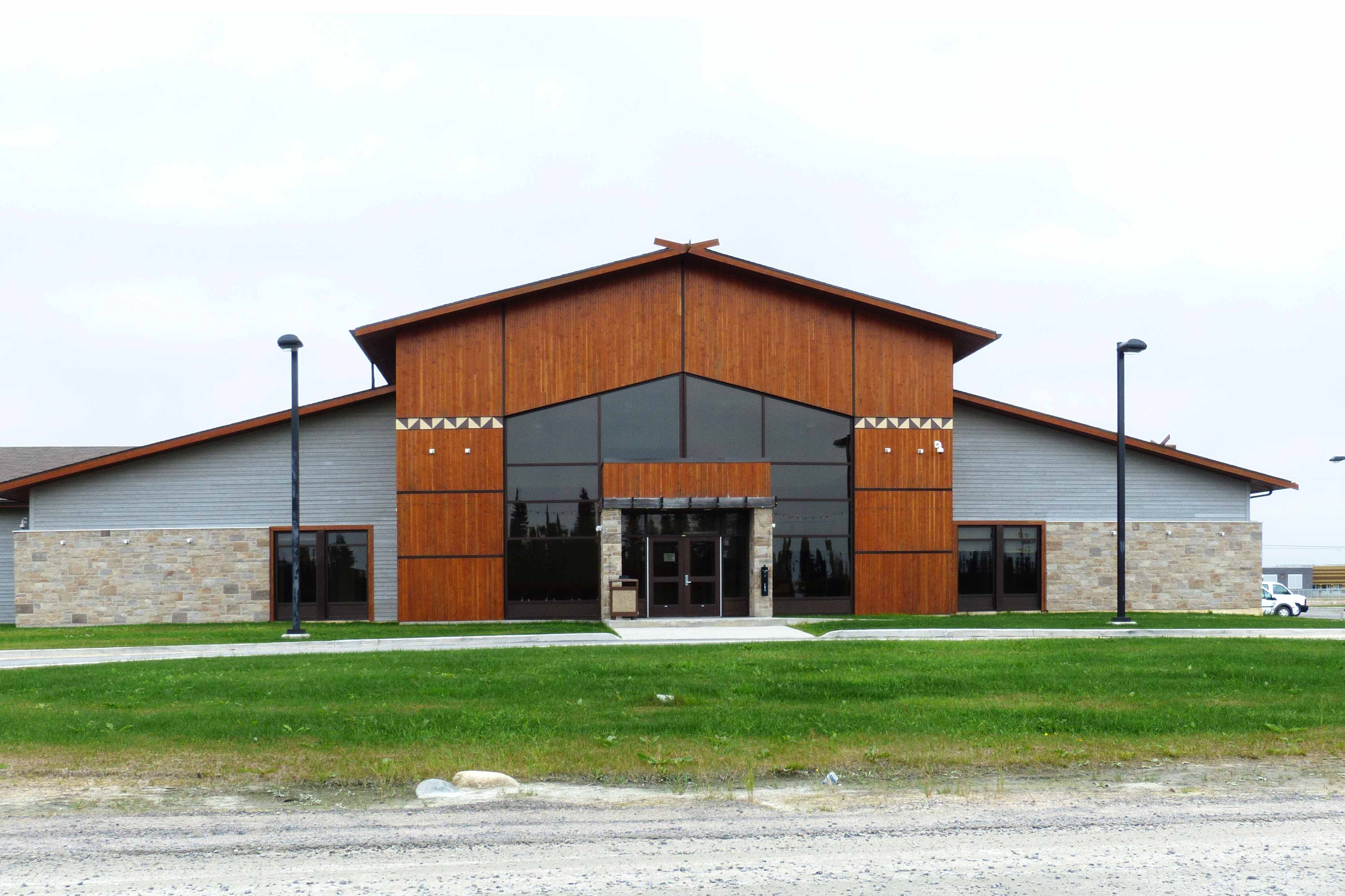
Chisasibi Courthouse (2015)
