= Cree Nation of Nemaska =

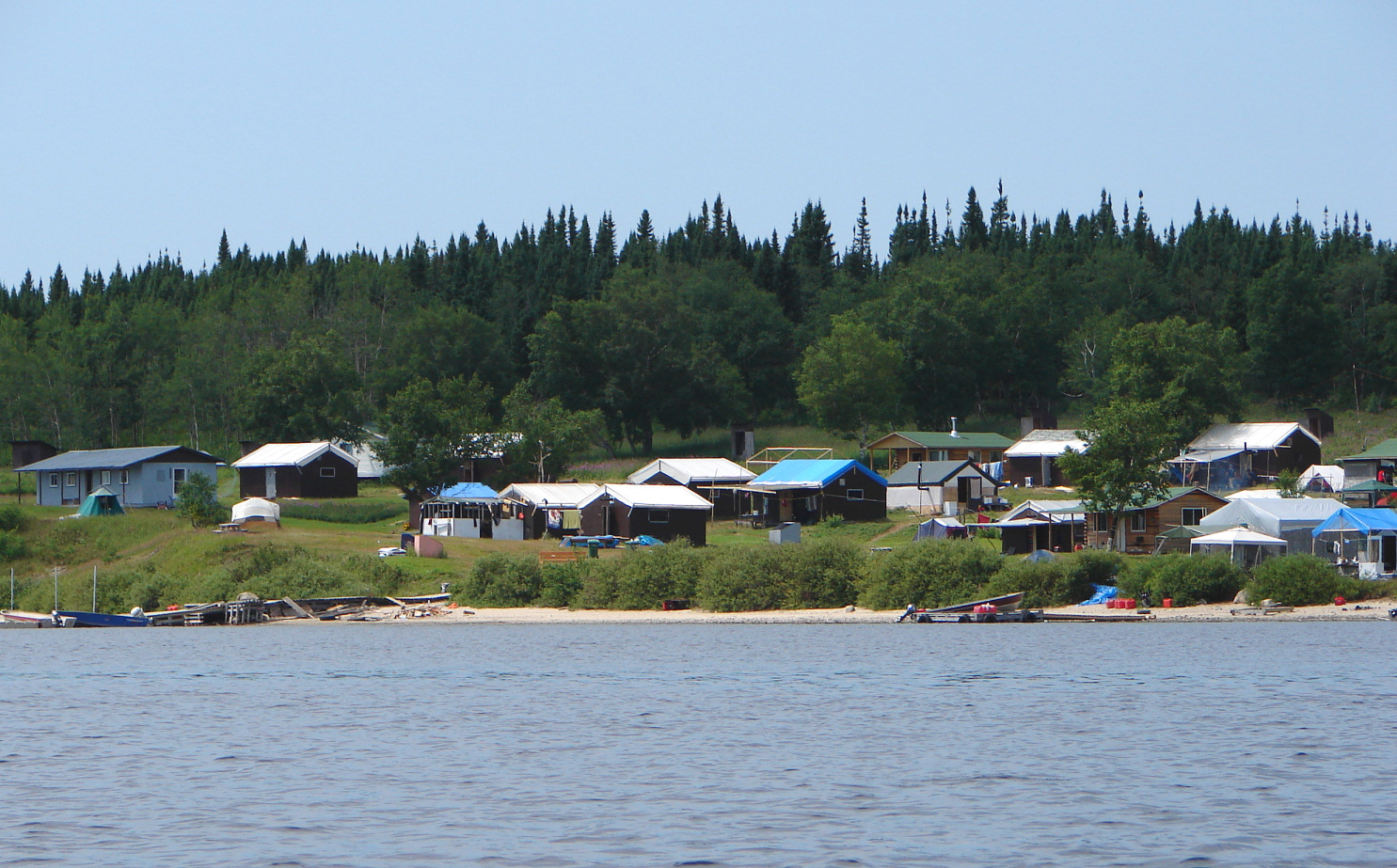
Cree village of Nemaska in 2006

The Cree Nation of Nemaska is a Cree First Nation of Quebec, Canada. It is headquartered at the Cree village of Nemaska and also has a terre réservée crie of the same name, both located in the Eeyou Istchee territory in Northern Quebec. In 2016, it has a registered population of 781 members. The nation is in negotiation with the government of Canada to obtain its self-governance.
