= The Crees of the Waskaganish First Nation =

Indigenous people in Canada

Coordinates: 51°29′21″N 78°44′53″W

The Crees of the Waskaganish First Nation Band No. 61 ᐧᐋᔅᑳᐦᐄᑲᓂᔥ ᐃᔨᔨᐤ ᑎᐯᔨᐦᒋᒉᓯᐤ
- People: Cree
- Headquarters: Waskaganish
- Province: Quebec

Land
- Main reserve: Waskaganish
- Land area: 502.26 km^{2}

Population (2019)
- On reserve: 2308
- On other land: 139
- Off reserve: 459
- Total population: 2906

Government
- Chief: Greta Whiskeychan-Cheechoo
- Council: Samson Wischee (Vice Chief); Tyronne Blackned; Susan Esau; Brenda Hester; Leona Hester; Sarah Cowboy-Whiskeychan; Glen Whiskeychan; Raymond Jolly; Mary Jane Salt; Neesha-Chanan Shecapio

Tribal Council
- Grand Council of the Crees

Website
- Waskaganish.ca

The Crees of the Waskaganish First Nation or Cree Nation of Waskaganish is a Cree First Nation of Canada. Waskaganish (Cree: ᐙᔅᑳᐦᐄᑲᓂᔥ/Wâskâhîkaniš) means Little House. It is headquartered in the Cree village of Waskaganish, Eeyou Istchee territory equivalent in Nord-du-Québec (Northern Quebec), Canada. Waskaganish terre réservée crie, or Cree reserved land, is a reserve for the Nation. The village is at the north end of the reserve. The reserve is situated on the southern shore at the mouth of the Rupert River as it empties into the southeast end of James Bay.
