= Mi'gmawei Mawiomi Secretariat =

The Mi'gmawei Mawiomi Secretariat is a political organization and a tribal council representing the Mi'gmaq people of Gespe’gewa’gi, the 7th district of Mi'gma'gi, the national territory of the Mi'kmaq. The territory of Gespe’gewa’gi includes eight Mi'gmaq communities. The tribal council of Mi'gmawei Mawiomi is composed of three Indian bands: Gesgapegiag, Gespeg and Listuguj. Together the three bands has a cumulative registered population of 6,295 members in 2016. The organization is headquartered at Listuguj.

In 2007, Mi'gmawei Mawiomi delivered a declaration titled Nm’tginen Me’mnaq Ejiglignmuetueg Gis Na Naqtmueg ("Our Territory: We never gave it and We never left it") to the governments of Canada and Quebec.

== List of bands ==
Three Indian bands are part of the tribal council of Mi'gmawei Mawioni Secretariat.

Number	Official name of the band	Headquarter location	Registered population as of November 2016
53	La Nation Micmac de Gespeg	Gaspé, Quebec (Fontenelle)	782
51	Listuguj Mi'gmaq Government	Listuguj Mi'gmaq First Nation	4,015
52	Micmacs of Gesgapegiag	Maria, Quebec	1,498

== See also ==
- Grand Council (Mi'kmaq)
