= Kitcisakik =

Indian settlement in Quebec, Canada

- Indian settlement

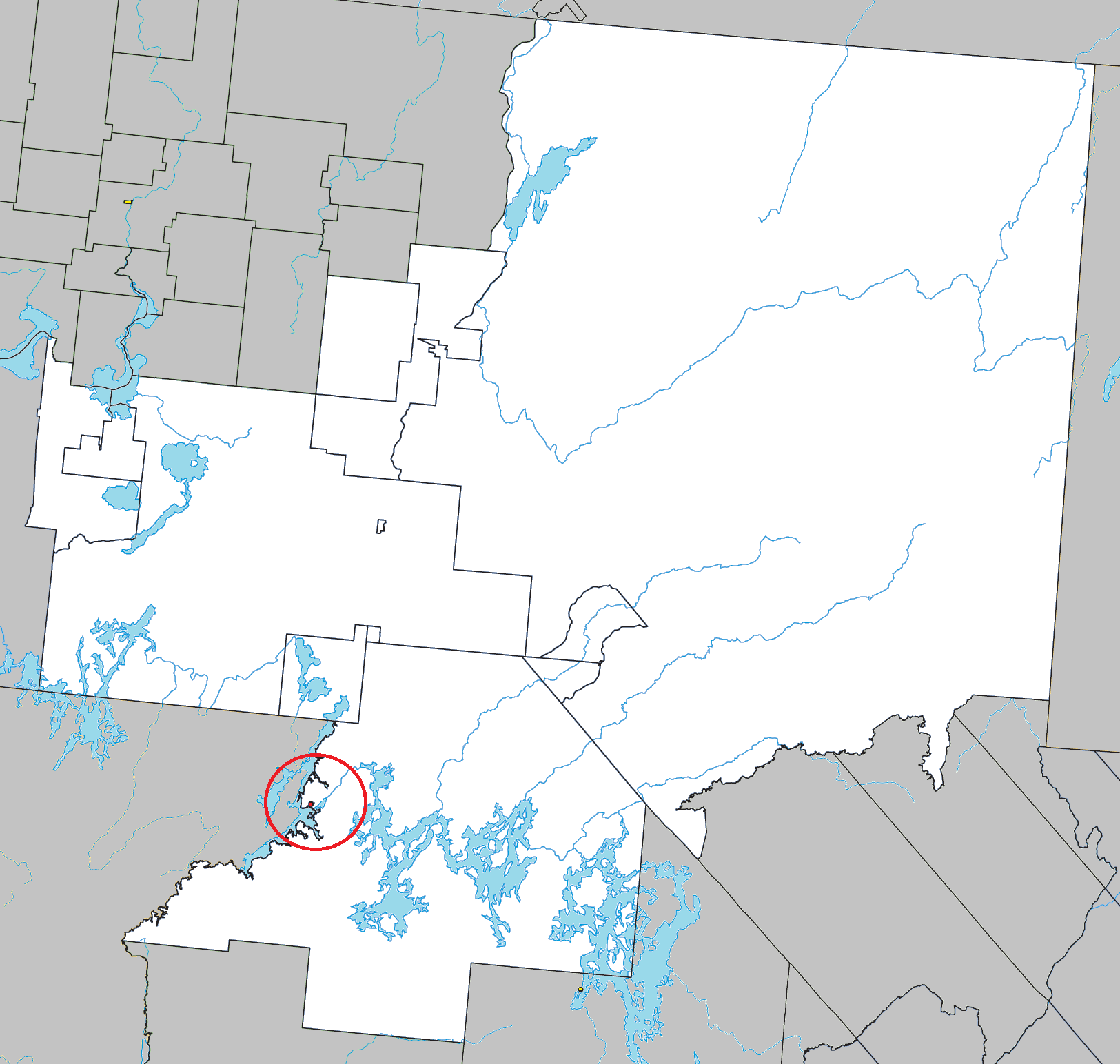
- Location within La Vallée-de-l'Or RCM.

- Location within Quebec Location within Canada
- Coordinates: 47°32′20″N 77°27′32″W
- Country: Canada
- Province: Quebec
- Region: Abitibi-Témiscamingue
- RCM: La Vallée-de-l'Or

Government
  - Chief: Adrienne Anichinapéo
  - Federal riding: Abitibi—Baie-James—Nunavik—Eeyou
  - Prov. riding: Abitibi-Est

Area
  - Land: 1.51 km^{2} (0.58 sq mi)

Population (2021)
  - Total: 257
  - Density: 170.2/km^{2} (441/sq mi)
  - Change (2016–21): ▼6.2%
  - Dwellings: 93
- Time zone: UTC−05:00 (EST)
  - Summer (DST): UTC−04:00 (EDT)
- Website: kitcisakik.ca

Kitcisakik or Grand-Lac Victoria Indian Settlement is an Indian settlement of the Kitcisakik Anicinape Community located in the Abitibi-Témiscamingue region of Quebec, Canada. It is geographically located within the territory of La Vallée-de-l'Or Regional County Municipality. Its population was 257 in the 2021 Canadian Census. Prior to October 23, 1999, it was known as Grand-Lac-Victoria.

On June 21, 2021, it was designated as a historic site by the Government of Quebec.
