= Cree Nation of Wemindji =

First Nation in Quebec, Canada

The Cree Nation of Wemindji (Wîminicî / ᐐᒥᓂᒌ) is a Cree First Nation of Northern Quebec, Canada. It is headquartered at the Cree village of Wemindji and also has the terre réservée crie of the same name, both located in the Eeyou Istchee territory. In 2016, it has a registered population of 1,589 members. It is in negotiation with the government of Canada to obtain its self-governance.
