= Oujé-Bougoumou Cree Nation =

Coordinates: 49°55′32″N 74°49′4″W

- Band No. 89
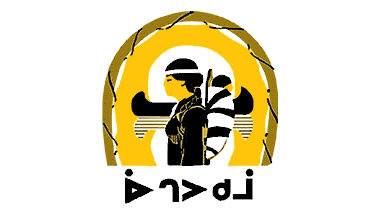
- People: Cree
- Headquarters: Oujé-Bougoumou
- Province: Quebec

Population (October 2019)
- On reserve: 779
- On other land: 22
- Off reserve: 128
- Total population: 929

Government
- Chief: Curtis Bosum
- Council: Harry Bosum; Sam R. Bosum; Susan Mark; Angel Mianscum; Janie Wapachee; Lance Cooper

Tribal Council
- Grand Council of the Crees

Website
- Ouje.ca

Oujé-Bougoumou Cree Nation is a Cree First Nation of Canada. It is headquartered in the Cree village of Oujé-Bougoumou, located on the shores of Opémisca Lake, in the Eeyou Istchee territory equivalent of Quebec. Oujé-Bougoumou is unique from the other First Nations of Eeyou Istchee in that it doesn't have an associated reserve. The village is 60 kilometres (37 mi) due west of Chibougamau.
