= Waskaganish (Cree village municipality) =

Waskaganish ᐙᔅᑳᐦᐄᑲᓂᔥ Wâskâhîkaniš
- Cree village municipality
- Rupert river marks the boundary between reserved lands and village municipality

- Location within Quebec
- Coordinates (70, rue Waskaganish): 51°12′N 78°46′W
- Country: Canada
- Province: Quebec
- Region: Nord-du-Québec
- RCM: None
- Constituted: June 28, 1978

Government
  - Mayor: Darlene Cheechoo
  - Federal riding: Abitibi—Baie-James—Nunavik—Eeyou
  - Prov. riding: Ungava

Area
  - Total: 294.30 km^{2} (113.63 sq mi)
  - Land: 277.76 km^{2} (107.24 sq mi)

Population (2011)
  - Total: 0
  - Density: 0/km^{2} (0/sq mi)
  - Change (2006–11): N/A
  - Dwellings: 0
- Time zone: UTC−5 (EST)
  - Summer (DST): UTC−4 (EDT)
- Postal code(s): J0M 1R0
- Area code: 819
- Website: www.waskaganish.ca

Waskaganish (Cree: ᐙᔅᑳᐦᐄᑲᓂᔥ/Wâskâhîkaniš, Little House; French pronunciation: [waskaɡaniʃ]) is a Cree village municipality in the territory of Eeyou Istchee in northern Quebec; it has a distinct legal status and classification from other kinds of village municipalities in Quebec: Naskapi village municipalities, northern villages), and ordinary villages.

As with all other Cree village municipalities in Quebec, there is a counterpart Cree reserved land of the same name located nearby: Waskaganish. The village and reserve are home to The Crees of the Waskaganish First Nation.

Despite the title of "village municipality" and the formalities that go along with it (such as having a mayor), Statistics Canada lists it (and all other Cree village municipalities in Quebec) as having no resident population or residential infrastructure (dwellings); it is the Cree reserved lands that are listed as having population and residential dwellings in the 2016 census, 2011 census, the 2006 census, and earlier censuses.

== Demographics ==
In the 2021 Census of Population conducted by Statistics Canada, Waskaganish had a population of 0 living in 0 of its 0 total private dwellings, no change from its 2016 population of 0. With a land area of 274.22 km^{2} (105.88 sq mi), it had a population density of 0.0/km^{2} (0.0/sq mi) in 2021.
