= Wemotaci Atikamekw Council =

Wemotaci Atikamekw Council (French: Conseil des Atikamekw de Wemotaci) is the band council of the Atikamekw of Wemotaci, Quebec. In 2016, the band has a registered population of 1,918 members. It has two Indian reserves: Coucoucache 24A and the community of Wemotaci where it is headquartered.
