= Cree Nation of Mistissini =

First Nation in Quebec, Canada

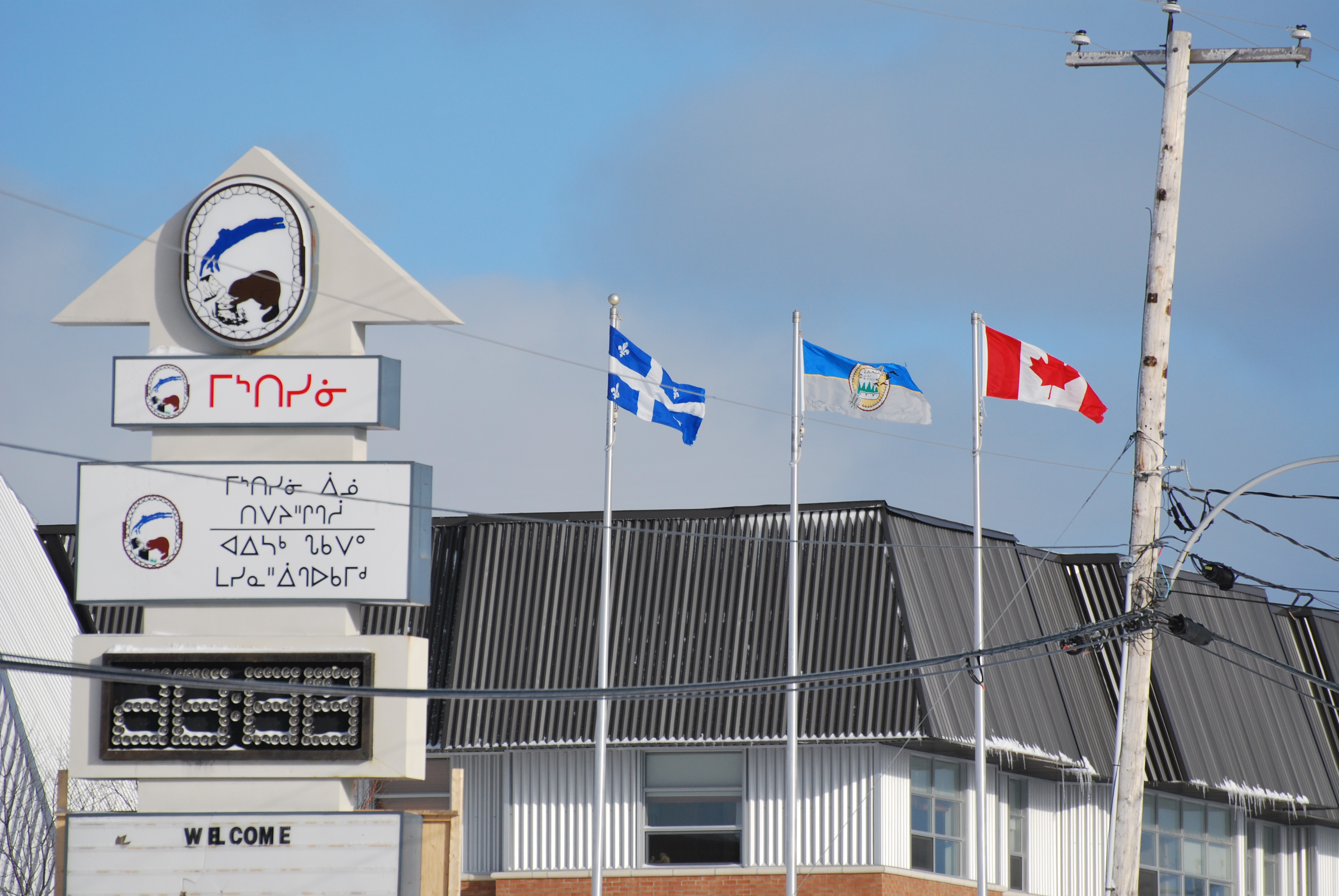
The Cree village of Mistissini in 2012

The Cree Nation of Mistissini (Cree: ᒥᔅᑎᓯᓃ) is a Cree First Nation of Canada. It is headquartered at the Cree village of Mistissini and also has a terre réservée crie of the same name, both in Northern Quebec. The nation is in negotiation with the government of Canada to obtain its self-governance. In 2016, it has a registered population of 3,964 members.
