= Chisasibi (Cree village municipality) =

Chisasibi ᒋᓵᓰᐲ chisaasiipii
- Cree village municipality (VC)
- Location within Quebec
- Coordinates (1, rue Riverside): 53°40′N 78°20′W
- Country: Canada
- Province: Quebec
- Region: Nord-du-Québec
- TE: Eeyou Istchee
- Constituted: 18 August 1980

Government
  - Chief: Daisy House
  - Federal riding: Abitibi—Baie-James—Nunavik—Eeyou
  - Prov. riding: Ungava

Area (2021)
  - Total: 4 km^{2} (1.5 sq mi)
  - Land: 480.29 km^{2} (185.44 sq mi)

Population (2021)
  - Total: 0
  - Change (2016–2021): N/A
- Time zone: UTC−05:00 (EST)
  - Summer (DST): UTC−04:00 (EDT)
- Postal code(s): J0M 1E0
- Area code: 819
- Website: www.chisasibi.ca

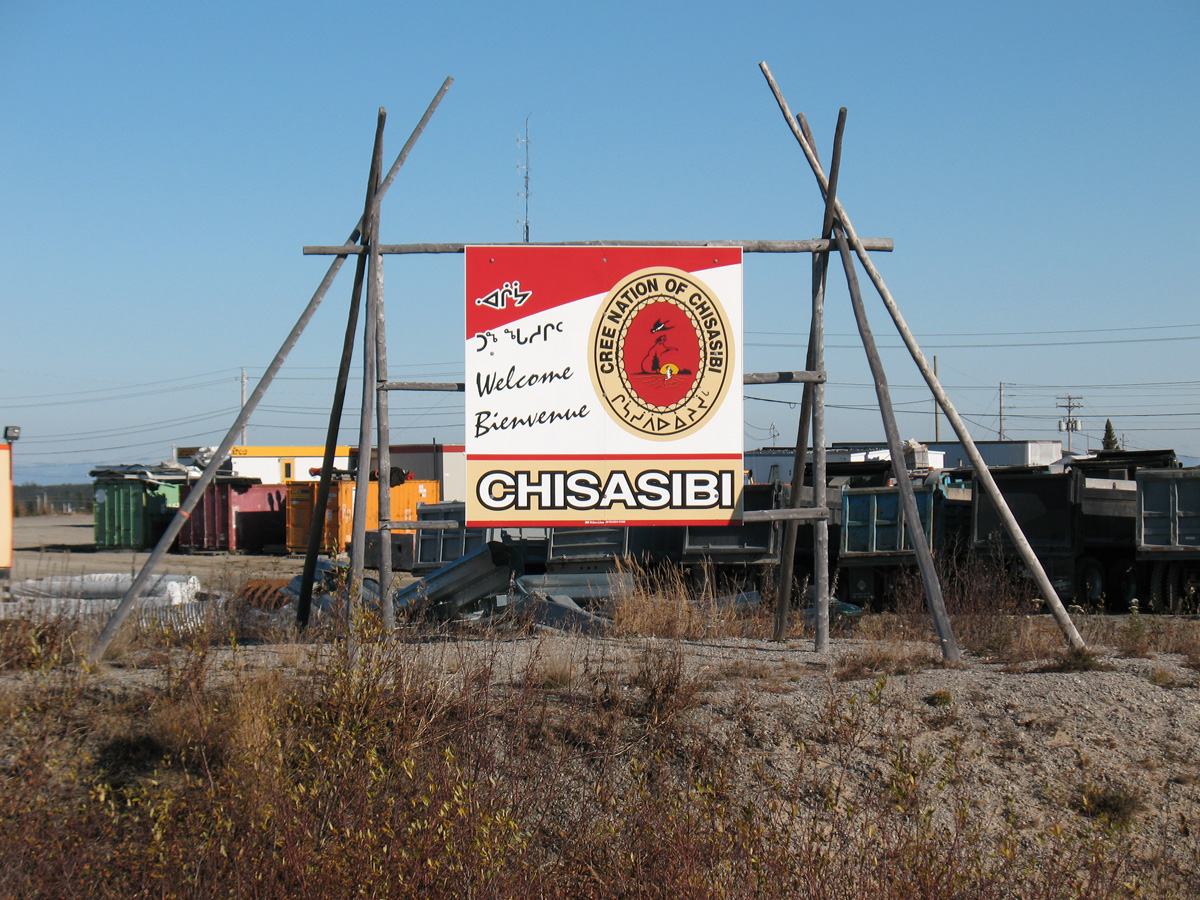
Welcome sign

Chisasibi (Cree: ᒋᓵᓰᐲ/Cisâsîpî) is a Cree village municipality (VC) in the territory of Eeyou Istchee in Nord-du-Québec; it has a distinct legal status and classification from other kinds of village municipalities in Quebec: Naskapi village municipalities, northern villages (Inuit communities), and ordinary villages.

As with all other Cree village municipalities in Quebec, there is a counterpart Cree reserved land of the same name located nearby: Chisasibi.

== Demographics ==
Despite the title of "village municipality" and the formalities that go along with it (for instance, having a mayor), Statistics Canada lists it (and all other Cree village municipalities in Quebec) as having no resident population or residential infrastructure (dwellings); it is the Cree reserved lands that are listed as having population and residential dwellings in the Canadian censuses.

In the 2021 Canadian census conducted by Statistics Canada, Chisasibi had a population of 0, unchanged from its 2016 population and a land area of 480.29 km^{2} (185.44 sq mi).

== See also ==
- List of anglophone communities in Quebec
