= Wemindji (Cree village municipality) =

Wemindji ᐐᒥᓂᒌ Wîminicî
- Cree village municipality
- Location within Quebec
- Coordinates (16, rue Beaver): 52°55′N 78°47′W
- Country: Canada
- Province: Quebec
- Region: Nord-du-Québec
- RCM: None
- Constituted: June 28, 1978

Government
  - Mayor: Rodney Mark
  - Federal riding: Abitibi—Baie-James—Nunavik—Eeyou
  - Prov. riding: Ungava

Area
  - Total: 184.90 km^{2} (71.39 sq mi)
  - Land: 171.06 km^{2} (66.05 sq mi)

Population (2011)
  - Total: 0
  - Density: 0/km^{2} (0/sq mi)
  - Change (2006–11): N/A
  - Dwellings: 0
- Time zone: UTC−5 (EST)
  - Summer (DST): UTC−4 (EDT)
- Postal code(s): J0M 1L0
- Area code: 819
- Website: www.wemindji-nation.qc.ca

Wemindji (Cree: ᐐᒥᓂᒌ/Wîminicî) is a Cree village municipality in the territory of Eeyou Istchee in northern Quebec; it has a distinct legal status and classification from other kinds of village municipalities in Quebec: Naskapi village municipalities, northern villages (Inuit communities), and ordinary villages.

As with all other Cree village municipalities in Quebec, there is a counterpart Cree reserved land of the same name located nearby: Wemindji.

Despite the title of "village municipality" and the formalities that go along with it (for instance, having a mayor), Statistics Canada lists it (and all other Cree village municipalities in Quebec) as having no resident population or residential infrastructure (dwellings); it is the Cree reserved lands that are listed as having population and residential dwellings in the 2011 census, the 2006 census, and earlier censuses.

== Demographics ==
In the 2021 Census of Population conducted by Statistics Canada, Wemindji had a population of 0 living in 0 of its 0 total private dwellings, no change from its 2016 population of 0. With a land area of 169.12 km^{2} (65.30 sq mi), it had a population density of 0.0/km^{2} (0.0/sq mi) in 2021.

== See also ==
- List of anglophone communities in Quebec
