= Kitcisakik Anicinape Community =

Coordinates: 47°32′N 77°27′W

The Kitcisakik Anicinape Community, which the official name is communauté anicinape de Kitcisakik, is an Indian band of the Algonquin First Nations in Quebec, Canada. The majority of its members lives on the Indian settlement of Kitcisakik, also called Grand-Lac Victoria, located on the shore of the Grand lac Victoria on La Vérendrye Wildlife Reserve, where is also located the band council, the Conseil des Anicinapek de Kitcisakik. In 2017 the band had a registered population of 498 members.

== Demographics ==
The members of the Kitcisakik Anicinape Community are Algonquin people. In March 2017 the band had a total registered population of 498 members, 88 of which lived off reserve. According to Statistics Canada's 2011 Census the median age of the population is 17.5 years old.

== Geography ==
The Kitcisakik Anicinape Community owns only one Indian reserve: the Indian settlementof Kitcisakik, also called Grand-Lac Victoria before 1999, located on the shore of the Grand lac Victoria on La Vérendrye Wildlife Reserve in Quebec, Canada. The closest main cities are Rouyn-Noranda and Val-d'Or. In fact the community is located 90 km southeast of Val-d'or.

== Government ==
The Kitcisakik Anicinape Community is governed by a band council, the Conseil des Anicinapek de Kitcisakik, elected according to a custom electoral system based on the Section 11 of the Indian Act. For 2013-2017 tenure this council is composed of the chief Adrienne Anichinapéo and three councillors. The community is affiliated with the Algonquin Anishinabeg Nation Tribal Council.

== See also ==
- Kitcisakik
- Algonquin people
- First Nations
- Aboriginal peoples in Quebec
- La Vérendrye Wildlife Reserve
