= Innue Essipit =

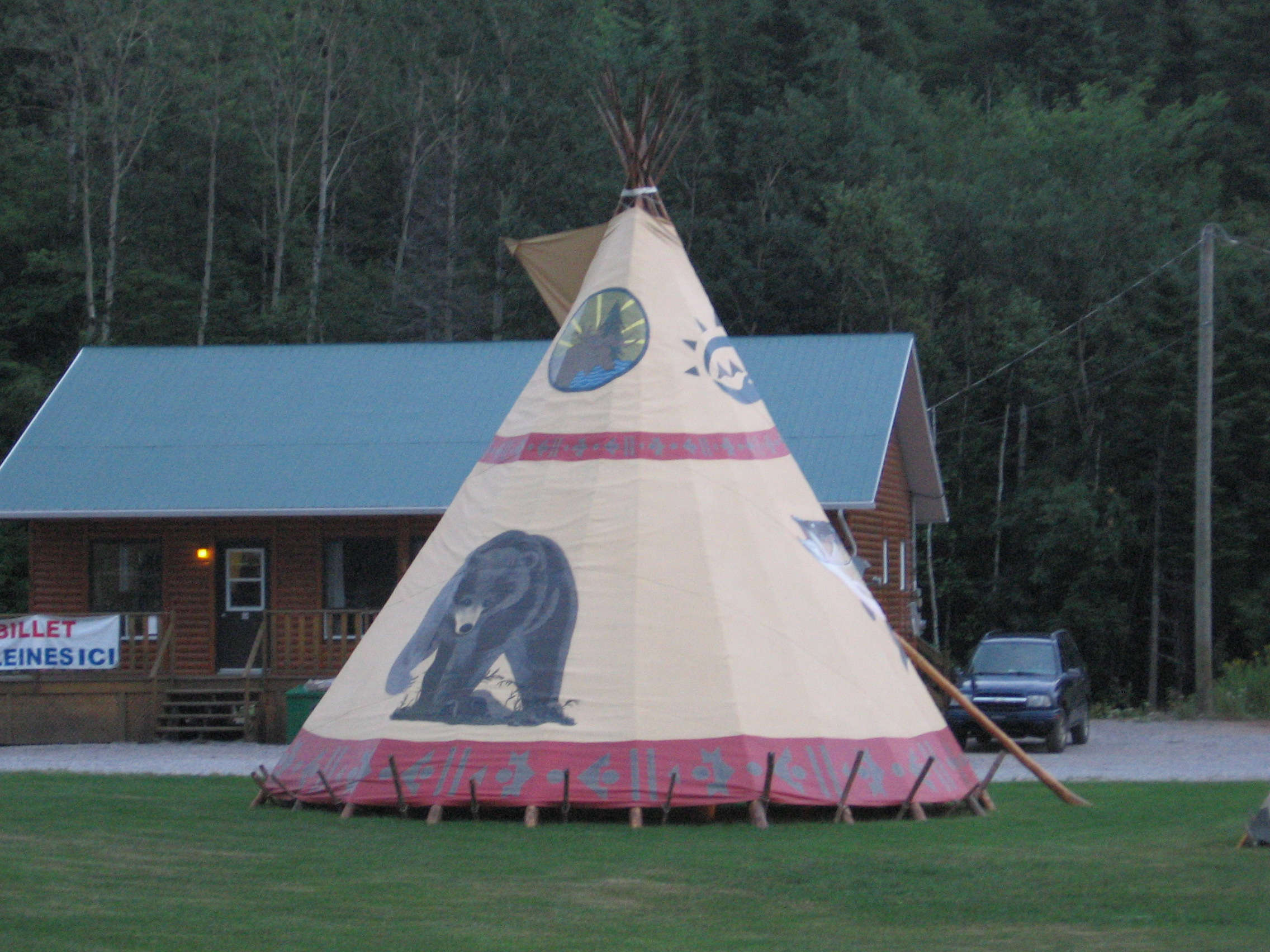
Essipit

Innue Essipit is an Innu First Nation in Quebec, Canada. It owns one reserve named Essipit where one-third of its population live, located in the Côte-Nord region on the North shore of the Saint Lawrence River. This is one of the nine Innu communities in Quebec. In 2018, it had a total registered population of 756 members. It is part of the Mamuitun Tribal Council.
