= Nemaska (Cree village municipality) =

Nemaska ᓀᒥᔅᑳᐤ Nemiskâw
- Cree village municipality
- Location within Quebec
- Coordinates (1, chemin Lakeshore): 51°43′N 76°20′W
- Country: Canada
- Province: Quebec
- Region: Nord-du-Québec
- RCM: Eeyou Istchee
- Constituted: June 28, 1978

Government
  - Chief: Clarence Jolly Sr.
  - Federal riding: Abitibi—Baie-James—Nunavik—Eeyou
  - Prov. riding: Ungava

Area
  - Total: 54.70 km^{2} (21.12 sq mi)
  - Land: 47.89 km^{2} (18.49 sq mi)

Population (2021)
  - Total: 1
  - Density: 0/km^{2} (0/sq mi)
  - Change (2016–21): N/A
  - Dwellings: 0
- Time zone: UTC−5 (EST)
  - Summer (DST): UTC−4 (EDT)
- Postal code(s): J0Y 3B0
- Area code: 819
- Website: www.nemaska.com

Nemaska (Cree: ᓀᒥᔅᑳᐤ/Nemiskâw) is an unpopulated Cree village municipality in the territory of Eeyou Istchee in northern Quebec, reserved for the exclusive use of the Cree nation. Its status, granted by the James Bay and Northern Quebec Agreement, differs from other kinds of village municipalities in Quebec.

Nemaska Cree village municipality is adjacent to the settlement of Nemaska, comprised in Category I-A lands of federal jurisdiction.

== Demographics ==
In the 2021 Census of Population conducted by Statistics Canada, Nemaska had a population of 1 living in 1 of its 2 total private dwellings, no change from its 2016 population of 1. With a land area of 47.89 km^{2} (18.49 sq mi), it had a population density of 0.0/km^{2} (0.0/sq mi) in 2021.

== See also ==
- List of anglophone communities in Quebec
