= Kebaowek First Nation =

First Nations band government in Quebec, Canada

Coordinates: 46°47′08″N 78°59′07″W

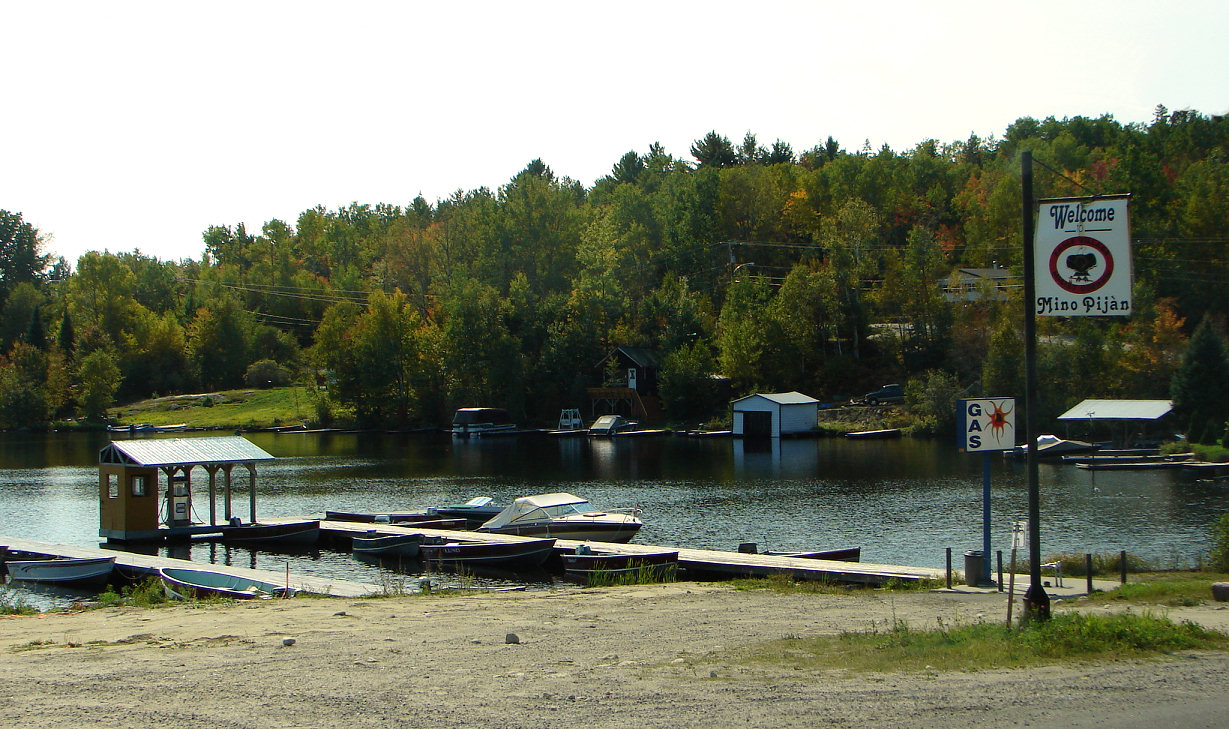
Welcome sign of Kebaowek First Nation, Quebec

Kebaowek First Nation is a First Nations band government in Quebec, Canada. Its only reserve has the same name, Kebaowek or Eagle Village First Nation - Kipawa Indian Reserve.

The community is affiliated with the Algonquin Anishinabeg Nation Tribal Council. According to Chief Michael Mckenzie (1923-1996), the reserve was established in 1965 for communities living in Wolf Lake, Brennan Lake, Long Point and other locations around Lake Kipawa. In 1970, 21 ha (52 acres) were set aside for the reservation and by 2021 the First Nation had 50.6 hectares (125 acres).

The Kebaowek First Nation has 890 registered members: 272 living on-reserve and 618 living off-reserve. The first language spoken in the community is English, following by Algonquin and French.
