= Eeyou Istchee =

Cree territory equivalent to a regional county municipality in Quebec, Canada

Eeyou / Eenou "human being"
- Person: Eeyou / Eenou ᐄᔨᔫ / ᐄᓅ
- People: Eeyouch / Eenouch ᐄᔨᔫᒡ / ᐄᓅᒡ
- Language: Eeyou / Eenou Ayimūn ᐄᔨᔫ / ᐄᓅ ᐊᔨᒨᓐ
- Country: Eeyou / Eenou Istchee ᐄᔨᔫ / ᐄᓅ ᐊᔅᒌ

Location of Eeyou Istchee within Québec

Eeyou Istchee (Note: (/iːjoʊ̯ ɪst͡ʃi/, Northern East Cree: ᐄᔨᔨᐤ ᐊᔅᒌ Iiyiyiu Aschii /ijɪjɪu əstʃi/, Southern East Cree: ᐄᔨᔫ ᐊᔅᒌ Iiyiyuu Aschii /ijɪju əstʃi/ or ᐄᓅ ᐊᔅᒌ Iinuu Aschii /inu əstʃi/, all meaning 'The People's Land'; French: [iju istʃi])) is a territory equivalent to a regional county municipality (TE) of Quebec that is represented by the Grand Council of the Crees. On July 24, 2012, the Quebec government signed an accord with the Cree Nation that resulted in the abolition of the neighbouring municipality of Baie-James and the creation of the new Eeyou Istchee James Bay Regional Government, providing for the residents of neighbouring Jamésie TE and Eeyou Istchee to jointly govern the territory formerly governed by the municipality of Baie-James.

The total land area of Eeyou Istchee is 5,271 km^{2} (2,035 sq mi), though the Grand Council of the Crees sees Eeyou Istchee as a much larger contiguous traditional territory and homeland of 450,000 square kilometres (170,000 sq mi). The total population of the area was 14,131 in 2006, according to the 2006 Canadian Census, and the largest municipality is the Cree village municipality of Chisasibi on the south bank of La Grande River near the northeast shore of James Bay.

Eeyou Istchee TE was created on November 30, 2007. Its territory had previously belonged to the TE of Jamésie. While most of Eeyou Istchee is enclaved within Jamésie TE, the Cree reserved land (TC) and Cree village municipality (VC) of Whapmagoostui lie north of the 55th parallel north and are enclaved within Kativik TE.

Together with the TEs of Jamésie and Kativik, it forms the region and census division (CD) of Nord-du-Québec.

== Communities ==
Census Code	Name	Cree Name	Type	Population 2011	Population 2006	Total dwellings	Dwellings usual res.	Land Area
2499055	Chisasibi	ᒋᓵᓰᐲ	VC	0	0	0	0	491.63
2499814	Chisasibi	ᒋᓵᓰᐲ	TC	4484	3972	1050	923	828.18
2499045	Eastmain	ᐄᔅᒣᐃᓐ	VC	0	0	0	0	316.91
2499810	Eastmain	ᐄᔅᒣᐃᓐ	TC	767	650	226	188	147.47
2499030	Mistissini	ᒥᔅᑎᓯᓃ	VC	0	0	0	0	514.30
2499804	Mistissini	ᒥᔅᑎᓯᓃ	TC	3427	2897	952	845	865.76
2499040	Nemaska	ᓀᒥᔅᑳᐤ	VC	0	0	0	0	51.18
2499808	Nemaska	ᓀᒥᔅᑳᐤ	TC	712	642	226	200	96.57
2499820	Oujé-Bougoumou	ᐆᒉᐳᑯᒨ	VC	0	0	0	0	65.41
2499818	Oujé-Bougoumou	ᐆᒉᐳᑯᒨ	TC	725	606	251	183	2.54
2499035	Waskaganish	ᐙᔅᑳᐦᐄᑲᓂᔥ	VC	0	0	0	0	277.76
2499806	Waskaganish	ᐙᔅᑳᐦᐄᑲᓂᔥ	TC	2206	1864	496	467	505.37
2499010	Waswanipi	ᐙᔂᓂᐲ	VC	0	0	0	0	211.52
2499802	Waswanipi	ᐙᔂᓂᐲ	TC	1777	1473	513	413	415.64
2499050	Wemindji	ᐐᒥᓂᒌ	VC	0	0	0	0	171.06
2499812	Wemindji	ᐐᒥᓂᒌ	TC	1378	1215	377	333	377.95
2499070	Whapmagoostui	ᐙᐱᒫᑯᔥᑐᐃ	VC	0	0	0	0	122.53
2499816	Whapmagoostui	ᐙᐱᒫᑯᔥᑐᐃ	TC	874	812	221	206	189.88
Eeyou Istchee total			TE	16350	14131	4312	3758	5586.25

The TE of Eeyou Istchee is governed by the Grand Council of the Crees by the Cree Nation Government. It consists of the following municipal units:

- the Cree reserved lands listed above (with code = TC, terre réservée crie):
- the Cree village municipalities listed above (with code VC, municipalité de village cri)

Somewhat confusingly, the Commission de toponymie du Québec refers to the Cree reserved lands as "Cree villages" (village cri), as distinct from the "Cree village municipalities" (municipalité de village cri). However, from a practical point of view this makes sense, since the population resides in these reserved lands.

== Definitions ==
The above map indicates the Category I lands reserved for the Cree under the terms of the James Bay and Northern Quebec Agreement. Though formally designated as a TE for these areas in 2007, the term "Eeyou Istchee" has long been applied by Quebec Cree to refer to themselves and all their traditional hunting lands. In Category II lands, owned by the Crown-in-right-of-Quebec, hunting, fishing and trapping rights are reserved for the Cree, while forestry, mining and tourism development authority is shared. In Category III lands, some specific hunting and harvesting rights are reserved for the Cree, but all other rights are shared subject to a joint regulatory scheme. Roughly 14,000 km^{2} fall into Category I, 150,000 km^{2} in Category II, and 908,000 km^{2} - almost 60 percent all land in Quebec - are in Category III.

== Sources ==
- Database of the geographical code of Quebec
- Regional maps of municipal and RCM/TE boundaries from the Ministère des Affaires municipales et des Régions. As of January 2008, the Nord-du-Québec map shows Jamésie territory as it was before the creation of Eeyou Istchee.
