= Classification of municipalities in Quebec =

The following is a list of the types of local and supralocal territorial units in Quebec, Canada, including those used solely for statistical purposes, as defined by the Ministry of Municipal Affairs, Regions and Land Occupancy and compiled by the Institut de la statistique du Québec

Not included are the urban agglomerations in Quebec, which, although they group together multiple municipalities, exercise only what are ordinarily local municipal powers.

A list of local municipal units in Quebec by regional county municipality can be found at List of municipalities in Quebec.

== Local municipalities ==
All municipalities (except cities), whether township, village, parish, or unspecified ones, are functionally and legally identical. The only difference is that the designation might serve to disambiguate between otherwise identically named municipalities, often neighbouring ones. Many such cases have had their names changed, or merged with the identically named nearby municipality since the 1950s, such as the former Township of Granby and City of Granby merging and becoming the Town of Granby in 2007.

Municipalities are governed primarily by the Code municipal du Québec (Municipal Code of Québec, R.S.Q. c. C-27.1), whereas cities and towns are governed by the Loi sur les cités et villes (Cities and Towns Act, R.S.Q. c. C-19) as well as (in the case of the older ones) various individual charters.

The very largest communities in Quebec are colloquially called cities; however there are currently no municipalities under the province's current legal system classified as cities. Quebec's government uses the English term town as the translation for the French term ville, and township for canton. The least-populated towns in Quebec (Barkmere, with a population of about 60, or L'Île-Dorval, with less than 10) are much smaller than the most populous municipalities of other types (Saint-Charles-Borromée and Sainte-Sophie, each with populations of over 13,300).

Abbr.	French term	English translation	Description	Lists
CT	Municipalité de canton	Township municipality	All or part of the territory of a township (townships were originally only a land surveying feature) set up as a municipality.	List of township municipalities in Quebec
CU	Municipalité de cantons unis	United township municipality	Municipality composed of several townships.	List of united township municipalities in Quebec
M	Municipalité	Municipality	Territory administered by an authority established under the laws governing municipalities.	List of municipalities (not otherwise specified) in Quebec
P	Municipalité de paroisse	Parish municipality	The territory of a religious parish established as a municipality.	List of parish municipalities in Quebec
V	Ville	Town	Municipality legally established as a town.	List of towns in Quebec
VL	Municipalité de village	Village municipality	Territory of a village established as a municipality separate from a surrounding parish or township municipality.	List of village municipalities in Quebec

The title city (French: cité, code: C) still legally exists, with a few minor differences from that of ville. However it is moot since there are no longer any cities in existence. Dorval and Côte Saint-Luc had the status of city when they were amalgamated into Montreal on January 1, 2002 as part of the municipal reorganization in Quebec; however, when re-constituted as independent municipalities on January 1, 2006, it was with the status of town (French: ville, although the municipal government of Dorval still uses the name Cité de Dorval).

Prior to January 1, 1995, the code for municipalité was not M but rather SD (sans désignation; that is, non-designated municipality).

== Aboriginal local municipal units ==
Abbr.	French term	English translation	Description	Lists
IRI (R)	Réserve indienne	Indian reserve	Territory reserved for Indians under the Indian Act. (Note: "A tract of federally owned land with specific boundaries that is set apart for the use and benefit of an Indian band and that is governed by Indigenous and Northern Affairs Canada (INAC).")	List of Indian reserves in Quebec
TC	Terre réservée aux Cris (1-A)	Land reserved for the Cree	Territory reserved for the use and benefit of the Cree population. Associated with a Cree village (VC) of the same name. (Note: "Parcels of land in Quebec set aside for the permanent residence of Cree First Nations of Quebec. Terres réservées aux Cris are adjacent to villages cris. The area of a village cri is set aside for the use of Cree bands, but members of Cree bands are not permanently residing there. Note that a village cri and its adjacent terre réservée aux Cris can have the same name, e.g., the village cri of Waswanipi and the terre reservée aux Cris of Waswanipi.")	List of Cree and Naskapi territories in Quebec
TI	Terre de la catégorie I pour les Inuits	Category I land for the Inuit	Territory reserved for the use and benefit of the Inuit population. Associated with a northern village (VN) of the same name.	List of northern villages and Inuit reserved lands in Quebec
TK	Terre réservée aux Naskapis (1-AN)	Land reserved for the Naskapi	Territory reserved for the use and benefit of the Naskapi (Innu) population. Associated with a Naskapi village (VK) of the same name. (Note: "Parcels of land in Quebec set aside for the permanent residence of Naskapi First Nations of Quebec. Terres réservées aux Naskapis are adjacent to village Naskapi. The lone area of village Naskapi is set aside for the use of the Naskapi band, although its members do not reside there permanently.")	List of Cree and Naskapi territories in Quebec
VC	Municipalité de village cri (Terre 1-B)	Cree village municipality	A primarily Cree village with a Cree local authority established by the Cree Villages and the Naskapi Village Act.	List of Cree and Naskapi territories in Quebec
VK	Municipalité de village naskapi (Terre 1-BN)	Naskapi village municipality	A primarily Naskapi (Innu) village with a Naskapi local authority established by the Cree Villages and the Naskapi Village Act.	List of Cree and Naskapi territories in Quebec
VN	Municipalité de village nordique	Northern village municipality	A village with an Inuit local authority established by the Act respecting Northern villages and the Kativik Regional Government.	List of northern villages and Inuit reserved lands in Quebec

Prior to 2004, there was a single code, TR, to cover the modern-day TC and TK. When the distinction between TC and TK was introduced, it was made retroactive to 1984, date of the federal Cree-Naskapi (of Quebec) Act (S.C. 1984, c. 18).

== Territories equivalent to local municipalities ==
Abbr.	French term	English translation	Description	Lists
NO	Territoire non organisé	Unorganized territory	A territory that has not been organized under a local municipality and is administered directly by a supralocal authority.	List of unorganized territories in Quebec

== Submunicipal units ==
Abbr.	French term	English translation	Description	Lists
A	Arrondissement	Borough	Subdivision of some local municipalities.	List of boroughs in Quebec
S-É (EI)	Établissement amérindien	Indian settlement	Village or hamlet the majority of whose population is Amerindian and situated on lands without any particular legal status. (Note: A place where a self-contained group of at least 10 Indian (Aboriginal) persons resides more or less permanently. It is usually located on Crown lands under federal or provincial/territorial jurisdiction. Indian settlements have no official limits and have not been set apart for the use and benefit of an Indian band as is the case with Indian reserves.)	List of Indian settlements in Quebec

There is also a different kind of submunicipal unit, unconstituted localities, which is defined and tracked not by the Quebec Ministry of Municipal Affairs but by Statistics Canada.

== Supralocal units ==
Abbr.	French term	English translation	Description	See also
ARg	Administration régionale	Regional government	Regional civil administration of a large, sparsely populated area representing Aboriginal and non-Aboriginal residents alike.	Kativik Regional Government
CM	Communauté métropolitaine	Metropolitan community	Administration bringing together the municipalities of a metropolitan area, larger than an urban agglomeration and not necessarily a multiple of RCMs and TEs.	Communauté métropolitaine de Montréal; Communauté métropolitaine de Québec
MRC	Municipalité régionale de comté	Regional county municipality (RCM)	A territory comprising municipalities and sometimes unorganized territories, governed by an authority determined by law.	List of regional county municipalities and equivalent territories in Quebec
TÉ	Territoire équivalent à une MRC	Territory equivalent to an RCM	A statistical unit created to cover areas of Quebec not belonging to an RCM.	List of regional county municipalities and equivalent territories in Quebec

== See also ==
- Administrative divisions of Quebec
