= List of northern villages and Inuit reserved lands in Quebec =

This is the list of communities in Quebec that have the legal status of northern village (village nordique, code=VN) as defined by the Ministry of Municipal Affairs, Regions and Land Occupancy and the Act respecting Northern villages and the Kativik Regional Government legislation.

A "northern village" is an Inuit community; these are all located north of the 55th parallel in the territory administered by the Kativik Regional Government. These have a separate legal status from Cree villages (code=VC), Naskapi villages (code=VK), or ordinary villages (code=VL).

Note that most (all but two) northern villages have a counterpart Inuit reserved land of the same name (code=TI, terre de catégorie 1 pour les Inuits or Terre de la catégorie I pour les Inuits or Terre réservée inuite). These are separate territories that are located near the northern village of the same name, and are for the exclusive use of Inuit for various hunting, fishing, and other economic activities. The 2021 and the 2016 census before it show that all of these Inuit reserved lands have no resident population.

== Northern villages and Inuit reserved lands ==
The total area of Kativik covers 500,164 km^{2} (193,114 sq mi) and, as of the 2021 Canadian census (Note: Total population obtained by adding all the individual population of all northern villages), a population of 13,963, a change of 7.8% from 2021 population of 12,949.

Census code	Name	Type	Population 2021	Population 2016	% change	Total dwellings	Dwellings usual res	Land area		Ref
Census code	Name	Type	Population 2021	Population 2016	% change	Total dwellings	Dwellings usual res	km^{2}	sqmi	Ref
2499883	Akulivik	TI	0	0	n/a	0	0	433.92	167.54	
2499125	Akulivik	VN	642	633	1.4%	204	181	75.02	28.97	
2499891	Aupaluk	TI	0	0	n/a	0	0	525.88	203.04	
2499105	Aupaluk	VN	233	209	11.5%	77	70	28.68	11.07	
2499879	Inukjuak	TI	0	0	n/a	0	0	420.69	162.43	
2499085	Inukjuak	VN	1,821	1,757	3.6%	588	481	54.92	21.20	
2499885	Ivujivik	TI	0	0	n/a	0	0	438.05	169.13	
2499140	Ivujivik	VN	412	414	−0.5%	136	123	35.15	13.57	
2499894	Kangiqsualujjuaq	TI	0	0	n/a	0	0	538.42	207.89	
2499090	Kangiqsualujjuaq	VN	874	735	18.9%	191	185	35.05	13.53	
2499888	Kangiqsujuaq	TI	0	0	n/a	0	0	561.33	216.73	
2499130	Kangiqsujuaq	VN	837	750	11.6%	321	297	12.41	4.79	
2499890	Kangirsuk	TI	0	0	n/a	0	0	512.43	197.85	
2499110	Kangirsuk	VN	561	567	−1.1%	197	170	57.15	22.07	
2499893	Kuujjuaq	TI	0	0	n/a	0	0	315.46	121.80	
2499095	Kuujjuaq	VN	2,668	2,754	−3.1%	1,253	973	289.97	111.96	
2499877	Kuujjuarapik	TI	0	0	n/a	0	0	289.92	111.94	
2499075	Kuujjuarapik	VN	792	654	21.1%	267	249	7.45	2.88	
2499120	Puvirnituq	VN	2,129	1,779	19.7%	697	547	81.61	31.51	
2499889	Quaqtaq	TI	0	0	n/a	0	0	503.65	194.46	
2499115	Quaqtaq	VN	453	403	12.4%	173	144	25.82	9.97	
2499887	Salluit	TI	0	0	n/a	0	0	591.68	228.45	
2499135	Salluit	VN	1,580	1,483	6.5%	473	426	15.08	5.82	
2499892	Tasiujaq	TI	0	0	n/a	0	0	492.69	190.23	
2499100	Tasiujaq	VN	420	369	13.8%	120	106	65.53	25.30	
2499878	Umiujaq	TI	0	0	n/a	0	0	253.95	98.05	
2499080	Umiujaq	VN	541	442	22.4%	178	168	28.38	10.96	

== Other ==
Some apparently outdated sources show the following as Inuit reserved lands:

- Kiggaluk, with geographic code 99875, adjacent to the Cree village of Chisasibi (this is below the 55th parallel and therefore outside the territory of the Kativik Regional Government)
- Killiniq, with geographic code 99896 (not to be confused with the abandoned town of Killiniq, Nunavut on Killiniq Island, about 50 km (31 mi) further north)

Neither of these is currently listed in the Répertoire des municipalités of the Ministère des Affaires municipales, des Régions et de l'Occupation du territoire, nor have they appeared in the Canadian censuses at least as far back as the 2001 census.

== See also ==
- 21st-century municipal history of Quebec
