= Umiujaq (Inuit reserved land) =

Coordinates: 56°33′00″N 76°24′10″W

Umiujaq ᐅᒥᐅᔭᖅ
- Inuit reserved land
- Interactive map of Umiujaq
- Country: Canada
- Province: Quebec
- Region: Nord-du-Québec
- TE: Kativik
- Constituted: September 8, 2004

Government
  - Federal riding: Abitibi—Baie-James—Nunavik—Eeyou
  - Prov. riding: Ungava

Area
  - Total: 256.20 km^{2} (98.92 sq mi)
  - Land: 257.78 km^{2} (99.53 sq mi)
- There is an apparent contradiction between two authoritative sources

Population (2011)
  - Total: 0
  - Density: 0/km^{2} (0/sq mi)
  - Change (2006–11): N/A
  - Dwellings: 0
- Time zone: UTC−5 (EST)
  - Summer (DST): UTC−4 (EDT)

Umiujaq (Inuktitut: ᐅᒥᐅᔭᖅ) is an Inuit reserved land (Category I land for Inuit) in Nunavik, in northern Quebec. Like all Inuit reserved lands in Quebec, it has no resident population (as of the Canada 2011 Census and previous censuses) and is associated with a nearby northern village of the same name: Umiujaq.

To its south, the Inuit reserved land of Umiujaq borders on the Inuit reserved land of Kuujjuarapik. Unlike most Inuit reserved lands, the Inuit reserved land of Kuujjuarapik is not located anywhere near its eponymous northern village, Kuujjuarapik, which is located 160 kilometres farther south near the Cree village of Whapmagoostui.
