= Aupaluk (Inuit reserved land) =

Coordinates: 59°16′48″N 69°30′00″W

Aupaluk ᐊᐅᐸᓗᒃ
- Inuit reserved land
- Interactive map of Aupaluk
- Country: Canada
- Province: Quebec
- Region: Nord-du-Québec
- TE: Kativik
- Constituted: May 2, 1995

Government
  - Federal riding: Abitibi—Baie-James—Nunavik—Eeyou
  - Prov. riding: Ungava

Area
  - Total: 592.40 km^{2} (228.73 sq mi)
  - Land: 544.03 km^{2} (210.05 sq mi)

Population (2011)
  - Total: 0
  - Density: 0/km^{2} (0/sq mi)
  - Change (2006–11): N/A
  - Dwellings: 0
- Time zone: UTC−5 (EST)
  - Summer (DST): UTC−4 (EDT)

Aupaluk (Inuktitut: ᐊᐅᐸᓗᒃ) is an Inuit reserved land (Category I land for Inuit) in Nunavik, in northern Quebec. Like all Inuit reserved lands in Quebec, it has no resident population (as of the Canada 2011 Census and previous censuses) and is associated with a nearby northern village of the same name: Aupaluk.

The Inuit reserved land of Aupaluk consists of three non-contiguous tracts of land, only one of which is adjacent to the northern village of the same name.
