= Quaqtaq (Inuit reserved land) =

Coordinates: 60°54′N 69°33′W

Quaqtaq ᖁᐊᖅᑕᖅ
- Inuit reserved land
- Interactive map of Quaqtaq
- Country: Canada
- Province: Quebec
- Region: Nord-du-Québec
- TE: Kativik
- Constituted: May 2, 1995

Government
  - Federal riding: Abitibi—Baie-James—Nunavik—Eeyou
  - Prov. riding: Ungava

Area
  - Total: 543.10 km^{2} (209.69 sq mi)
  - Land: 523.83 km^{2} (202.25 sq mi)

Population (2011)
  - Total: 0
  - Density: 0/km^{2} (0/sq mi)
  - Change (2006–11): N/A
  - Dwellings: 0
- Time zone: UTC−5 (EST)
  - Summer (DST): UTC−4 (EDT)

Quaqtaq (Inuktitut: ᖁᐊᖅᑕᖅ) is an Inuit reserved land (Category I land for Inuit) in Nunavik, in northern Quebec. Like all Inuit reserved lands in Quebec, it has no resident population (as of the Canada 2011 Census and previous censuses) and is associated with a nearby northern village of the same name: Quaqtaq.
