= Kuujjuarapik (Inuit reserved land) =

Coordinates: 56°19′N 76°31′W

Kuujjuarapik ᑰᔾᔪᐊᕌᐱᒃ
- Inuit reserved land
- Interactive map of Kuujjuarapik
- Country: Canada
- Province: Quebec
- Region: Nord-du-Québec
- TE: Kativik
- Constituted: September 8, 2004

Government
  - Federal riding: Abitibi—Baie-James—Nunavik—Eeyou
  - Prov. riding: Ungava

Area
  - Total: 285.70 km^{2} (110.31 sq mi)
  - Land: 293.66 km^{2} (113.38 sq mi)
- There is an apparent contradiction between two authoritative sources

Population (2011)
  - Total: 0
  - Density: 0/km^{2} (0/sq mi)
  - Change (2006–11): N/A
  - Dwellings: 0
- Time zone: UTC−5 (EST)
  - Summer (DST): UTC−4 (EDT)

Kuujjuarapik (Inuktitut: ᑰᔾᔪᐊᕌᐱᒃ) is an Inuit reserved land (Category I land for Inuit) in Nunavik, in northern Quebec. Like all Inuit reserved lands in Quebec, it has no resident population (as of the Canada 2011 Census and previous censuses) and has a counterpart northern village of the same name: Kuujjuarapik.

Unlike most other Inuit reserved lands, however, the Inuit reserved land of Kuujjuarapik is not adjacent to the northern village of the same name; rather, it is located considerably farther north and in fact borders on the Inuit reserved land of Umiujaq.
