= Kangiqsualujjuaq (Inuit reserved land) =

Coordinates: 58°41′28″N 65°49′12″W

Kangiqsualujjuaq ᑲᖏᖅᓱᐊᓗᔾᔪᐊᖅ
- Inuit reserved land
- Interactive map of Kangiqsualujjuaq
- Country: Canada
- Province: Quebec
- Region: Nord-du-Québec
- TE: Kativik
- Constituted: May 2, 1995

Government
  - Federal riding: Abitibi—Baie-James—Nunavik—Eeyou
  - Prov. riding: Ungava

Area
  - Total: 578.90 km^{2} (223.51 sq mi)
  - Land: 538.42 km^{2} (207.89 sq mi)

Population (2011)
  - Total: 0
  - Density: 0/km^{2} (0/sq mi)
  - Change (2006–11): N/A
  - Dwellings: 0
- Time zone: UTC−5 (EST)
  - Summer (DST): UTC−4 (EDT)

Kangiqsualujjuaq (Inuktitut: ᑲᖏᖅᓱᐊᓗᔾᔪᐊᖅ) is an Inuit reserved land (Category I land for Inuit) in Nunavik, in northern Quebec. Like all Inuit reserved lands in Quebec, it has no resident population (as of the 2011 Canadian census and previous censuses) and is associated with a nearby northern village of the same name, Kangiqsualujjuaq.
