= Tasiujaq (Inuit reserved land) =

Coordinates: 58°30′N 69°56′W

Tasiujaq ᑕᓯᐅᔭᖅ
- Inuit reserved land
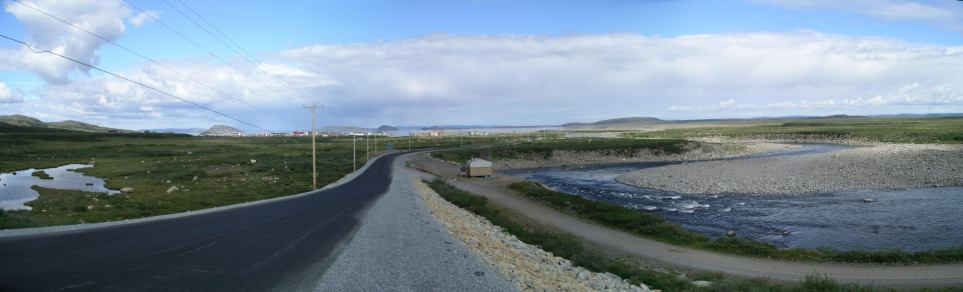
- Interactive map of Tasiujaq
- Country: Canada
- Province: Quebec
- Region: Nord-du-Québec
- TE: Kativik
- Constituted: May 2, 1995

Government
  - Federal riding: Abitibi—Baie-James—Nunavik—Eeyou
  - Prov. riding: Ungava

Area
  - Total: 557.30 km^{2} (215.17 sq mi)
  - Land: 502.11 km^{2} (193.87 sq mi)

Population (2011)
  - Total: 0
  - Density: 0/km^{2} (0/sq mi)
  - Change (2006–11): N/A
  - Dwellings: 0
- Time zone: UTC−05:00 (EST)
  - Summer (DST): UTC−04:00 (EDT)

Tasiujaq (Inuktitut: ᑕᓯᐅᔭᖅ) is an Inuit reserved land (Category I land for Inuit) in Nunavik, in northern Quebec. Like all Inuit reserved lands in Quebec, it has no resident population (as of the 2011 Canadian census and previous censuses) and is associated with a nearby northern village of the same name: Tasiujaq.

The Inuit reserved land of Tasiujaq consists of two non-contiguous tracts of land, only one of which is adjacent to the northern village of the same name; the other part lies on the opposite (northern) shore of Leaf Lake.
