= Kangirsuk (Inuit reserved land) =

Coordinates: 60°06′N 70°12′W

Kangirsuk ᑲᖏᕐᓱᒃ
- Inuit reserved land
- Interactive map of Kangirsuk
- Country: Canada
- Province: Quebec
- Region: Nord-du-Québec
- TE: Kativik
- Constituted: May 2, 1995

Government
  - Federal riding: Abitibi—Baie-James—Nunavik—Eeyou
  - Prov. riding: Ungava

Area
  - Total: 563.80 km^{2} (217.68 sq mi)
  - Land: 529.40 km^{2} (204.40 sq mi)

Population (2011)
  - Total: 0
  - Density: 0/km^{2} (0/sq mi)
  - Change (2006–11): N/A
  - Dwellings: 0
- Time zone: UTC−5 (EST)
  - Summer (DST): UTC−4 (EDT)

Kangirsuk (Inuktitut: ᑲᖏᕐᓱᒃ) is an Inuit reserved land (Category I land for Inuit) in Nunavik, in northern Quebec, Canada. Like all Inuit reserved lands in Quebec, it has no resident population (as of the Canada 2011 Census and previous censuses) and is associated with a nearby northern village of the same name: Kangirsuk.
