= Salluit (Inuit reserved land) =

Coordinates: 62°08′N 75°38′W

Salluit ᓴᓪᓗᐃᑦ
- Inuit reserved land
- Interactive map of Salluit
- Country: Canada
- Province: Quebec
- Region: Nord-du-Québec
- TE: Kativik
- Constituted: May 2, 1995

Government
  - Federal riding: Abitibi—Baie-James—Nunavik—Eeyou
  - Prov. riding: Ungava

Area
  - Total: 613.00 km^{2} (236.68 sq mi)
  - Land: 596.84 km^{2} (230.44 sq mi)

Population (2011)
  - Total: 0
  - Density: 0/km^{2} (0/sq mi)
  - Change (2006–11): N/A
  - Dwellings: 0
- Time zone: UTC−5 (EST)
  - Summer (DST): UTC−4 (EDT)

Salluit (Inuktitut: ᓴᓪᓗᐃᑦ) is an Inuit reserved land (Category I land for Inuit) in Nunavik, in northern Quebec. Like all Inuit reserved lands in Quebec, it has no resident population (as of the Canada 2011 Census and previous censuses) and is associated with a nearby northern village of the same name: Salluit.
