= Michel Létourneau =

Canadian politician (1949–2019)

MNA for Ungava
- In office September 12, 1994 – March 26, 2007
- Preceded by: Christian Claveau
- Succeeded by: Luc Ferland

Personal details
- Born: October 10, 1949 Montreal, Quebec, Canada
- Died: October 1, 2019 (aged 69) Quebec City, Quebec, Canada
- Party: Parti Québécois

Michel Létourneau (October 10, 1949 – October 1, 2019) was a Canadian politician in the province of Quebec. He served in the National Assembly of Quebec from 1994 to 2007 as a member of the Parti Québécois (PQ) and was a cabinet minister in the government of Bernard Landry.

== Early life and career ==
Létourneau had a Bachelor's degree in recreology from the Université du Québec à Trois-Rivières (1982) and a master's degree in public administration from the École nationale d'administration publique (1990). He was service director for recreation, culture, and tourism in the municipality of Baie-James from 1979 to 1985; director general of the Lanaudière regional recreation council from 1985 to 1990; and director for the development society of Baie-James from 1990 to 1994. He also served as a municipal councillor in Matagami from 1981 to 1985.

== Legislator ==
Létourneau was elected to the National Assembly of Quebec in the 1994 provincial election, winning as a Parti Québécois candidate in the vast northern riding of Ungava. The PQ won a majority government in this campaign, and Létourneau entered the legislature as a backbench supporter of Jacques Parizeau's administration. He served as parliamentary assistant to the premier from September 27, 1995, until Parizeau's resignation on January 29, 1996.

He held other parliamentary assistantships over the next three years before again serving as parliamentary assistant to the premier from January 28, 1999 to January 30, 2002. He was also regional secretary for the Nord-du-Québec region from 1996 to 1998. During this period, he worked to improve the often fractious relations between the Quebec government and Cree communities in northern Quebec. He also took part in a government delegation to Slovenia in 1998, to study political and economic developments in that country.

Létourneau was appointed to Bernard Landry's cabinet on January 30, 2002, as the junior Minister Responsible for the Development of Northern Quebec (Nord-du-Québec), with responsibility for Côte-Nord. He received additional responsibility as the junior Minister of Aboriginal Affairs on February 13 of the same year. He took part in a major deal between the Quebec government and the province's Inuit community in April 2002. In the same year, he successfully lobbied to have an inukshuk constructed on the grounds of the National Assembly.

Létourneau was re-elected in the 2003 general election as the PQ lost power to the Liberals. He served as an opposition member for the next four years and was his party's critic for natural resources. He did not seek re-election in the 2007 election.

== After politics ==
Létourneau pursued a doctorate at the Sorbonne in the geopolitics of northern development. He died on October 1, 2019, just prior to his 70th birthday.

== Electoral record ==
2003 Quebec general election: Ungava
Party	Candidate	Votes	%
Parti Québécois	Michel Létourneau	5,744	50.11
Liberal	Donald Don Bubar	4,258	37.15
Action démocratique	Gloria Trudeau	1,460	12.74
Total valid votes		11,462	100.00
Rejected and declined votes		192	
Turnout		11,654	50.52
Electors on the lists		23,067	

1998 Quebec general election: Ungava
Party	Candidate	Votes	%	±%
Parti Québécois	Michel Létourneau	6,482	48.22	−5.97
Liberal	Claude Eric Gagné	5,517	41.04	+1.04
Action démocratique	Steve Paquette	1,443	10.74	
Total valid votes		13,442	100.00	
Rejected and declined votes		180		
Turnout		13,622	61.93	+10.12
Electors on the lists		21,997		
Source: Official Results, Government of Quebec

1994 Quebec general election: Ungava
Party	Candidate	Votes	%	±%
Parti Québécois	Michel Létourneau	7,276	54.19	
Liberal	Victo Murray	5,371	40.00	
Green	Thomas DeMarco	407	3.03	–
Natural Law	Marlène Charland	372	2.77	
Total valid votes		13,426	100.00	
Rejected and declined votes		296		
Turnout		13,722	51.81	
Electors on the lists		26,483		
