= La Moinerie crater =

Impact crater in Quebec, Canada

Coordinates: 57°25′37″N 66°35′39″W

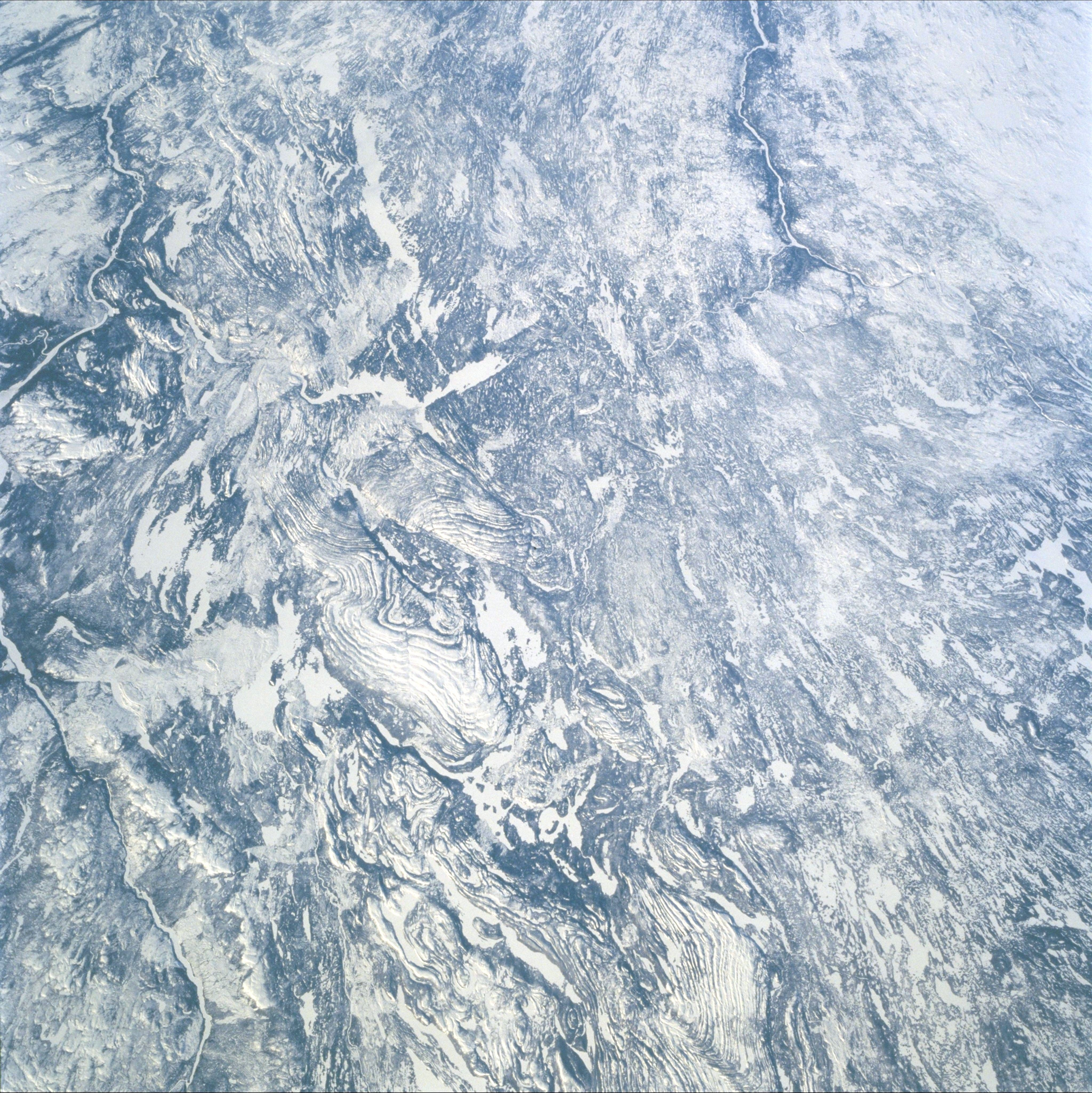
Lac La Moinerie, Quebec, Canada, as seen from Earth orbit. Image courtesy NASA.

La Moinerie is an impact crater in Quebec, Canada. It is 8 km in diameter and the age is estimated to be 400 ± 50 million years (Silurian or Devonian). The crater is exposed to the surface and filled with water, forming Lac La Moinerie. Glaciers have eroded many of La Moinerie crater's original physical features, including much of the central uplift. It is located in Rivière-Koksoak, in the Kativik territory.
