= Aisa Tuluga =

Inuk artist

- Born: 1899; Nunavik
- Died: 1970 (aged 70–71); Puvirnituq, Nunavik

Aisa Tuluga (1899 – 1970) was an Inuk artist.

His work is included in the collections of the Musée national des beaux-arts du Québec and the Birmingham Museum of Art.
