= Kuugjuaq =

Kuugjuaq is an Inuit language name and may refer to:

- Churchill, Manitoba, a town on the West shore of Hudson Bay in Manitoba, Canada
- Perry River (Nunavut), a waterway in the Kitikmeot Region of Nunavut, Canada

== See also ==
- Kuujjuaq, Nunavik region of Quebec, Canada
- Kuujjuaq (Inuit reserved land), Nunavik region of Quebec, Canada
