= Kuujjuaq (Inuit reserved land) =

Kuujjuaq ᑰᔾᔪᐊᖅ
- Inuit reserved land
- Location in Quebec Kuujjuaq (Canada)
- Coordinates: 58°12′N 68°33′W
- Country: Canada
- Province: Quebec
- Region: Nord-du-Québec
- TE: Kativik
- Constituted: May 2, 1995

Government
  - Federal riding: Abitibi—Baie-James—Nunavik—Eeyou
  - Prov. riding: Ungava

Area
  - Total: 352.20 km^{2} (135.99 sq mi)
  - Land: 320.80 km^{2} (123.86 sq mi)

Population (2011)
  - Total: 0
  - Density: 0/km^{2} (0/sq mi)
  - Change (2006–11): N/A
  - Dwellings: 0
- Time zone: UTC−05:00 (EST)
  - Summer (DST): UTC−04:00 (EDT)

Kuujjuaq (Inuktitut: ᑰᔾᔪᐊᖅ) is an Inuit reserved land (TI - Category I land for Inuit) in Nunavik, in northern Quebec. Like all Inuit reserved lands in Quebec, it has no resident population (as of the Canada 2011 Census and previous censuses) and is associated with a nearby northern village (VN - Northern village municipality) of the same name: Kuujjuaq.
