= Killiniq =

Killiniq may refer to:

- Killiniq Island, part of Nunavut, just offshore from the northernmost point of the Quebec-Labrador border in Canada
- Killiniq, Nunavut, a former town on Killiniq Island, abandoned around 1979
- Killiniq, Quebec, a former Inuit reserved land on the eastern shore of Ungava Bay, about 50 kilometres south of Killiniq Island
