= Ungava (electoral district) =

Provincial electoral district in Quebec, Canada

Coordinates: 57.5°N 68.7°W

Quebec electoral district

Provincial electoral district
- Legislature: National Assembly of Quebec
MNA
Sonia Caron
Parti Québécois
- District created: 1980
- First contested: 1981
- Last contested: 2026

Demographics
- Population (2016): 44,560
- Electors (2017): 27,501
- Area (km²): 855,110.7
- Pop. density (per km²): 0.05
- Census division: Nord-du-Québec
- Census subdivision(s): Akulivik (northern village), Aupaluk (northern village), Baie-James, Chapais, Chibougamau, Chisasibi (Cree village municipality), Eastmain (Cree village municipality), Inukjuak (northern village), Ivujivik, Kangiqsualujjuaq (northern village), Kangiqsujuaq (northern village), Kangirsuk (northern village), Kuujjuaq (northern village), Kuujjuarapik (northern village), Lebel-sur-Quévillon, Matagami, Mistissini (Cree village municipality), Nemaska (Cree village municipality), Puvirnituq, Quaqtaq (northern village), Salluit (northern village), Tasiujaq (northern village), Umiujaq (northern village), Waskaganish (Cree village municipality), Waswanipi (Cree village municipality), Wemindji (Cree village municipality), Whapmagoostui (Cree village municipality), Oujé-Bougoumou; Akulivik (Inuit reserved land), Aupaluk (Inuit reserved land), Chisasibi (Cree reserved land), Eastmain (Cree reserved land), Inukjuak (Inuit reserved land), Kangiqsualujjuaq (Inuit reserved land), Kangiqsujuaq (Inuit reserved land), Kangirsuk (Inuit reserved land), Kiggaluk, Killiniq, Kuujjuaq (Inuit reserved land), Kuujjuarapik (Inuit reserved land), Mistissini (Cree reserved land), Nemaska (Cree reserved land), Quaqtaq (Inuit reserved land), Salluit (Inuit reserved land), Tasiujaq (Inuit reserved land), Umiujaq (Inuit reserved land), Waskaganish (Cree reserved land), Waswanipi (Cree reserved land), Wemindji (Cree reserved land), Whapmagoostui (Cree reserved land); Baie-d'Hudson, Rivière-Koksoak (part)

Ungava (French pronunciation: [uŋɡava]) is a provincial electoral district in the Nord-du-Québec region of Quebec, Canada, that elects members to the National Assembly of Quebec. It includes all of the Nord-du-Québec region (which is also a single census division) except for the Naskapi village municipality of Kawawachikamach.

It covers the Ungava Peninsula of northern Quebec and notably includes the municipalities and communities of Chibougamau, Chisasibi, Mistissini, Kuujjuaq, Eeyou Istchee Baie James, Waskaganish, Puvirnituq, Lebel-sur-Quévillon, Inukjuak, and Wemindji.

It was created for the 1981 election from Abitibi-Est and Abitibi-Ouest electoral districts.

In the change from the 2001 to the 2011 electoral map, it lost the unorganized territories of Caniapiscau and Lac-Juillet (in Côte-Nord region) to Duplessis electoral district.

== Members of the National Assembly ==
Legislature	Years	Member	Party
Riding created from Abitibi-Est and Abitibi-Ouest
32nd	1981–1985	Marcel Lafrenière	Parti Québécois
33rd	1985–1989	Christian Claveau	Parti Québécois
34th	1989–1994	Christian Claveau	Parti Québécois
35th	1994–1998	Michel Létourneau	Parti Québécois
36th	1998–2003	Michel Létourneau	Parti Québécois
37th	2003–2007	Michel Létourneau	Parti Québécois
38th	2007–2008	Luc Ferland	Parti Québécois
39th	2008–2012	Luc Ferland	Parti Québécois
40th	2012–2014	Luc Ferland	Parti Québécois
41st	2014–2018	Jean Boucher	Liberal
42nd	2018–2022	Denis Lamothe	Coalition Avenir Québec
43rd	2022–2026	Denis Lamothe	Coalition Avenir Québec
44th	2026–Present	Sonia Caron	Parti Québécois

== Election results ==
2026 Quebec general election
** Preliminary results — Not yet official **
Party	Candidate	Votes	%	±%
Parti Québécois	Sonia Caron	3,272	39.23	
Liberal	Sandrine Rioux	2,309	27.68	
Conservative	Marc Damant	1,447	17.35	
Coalition Avenir Québec	Amélie Béchard	863	10.35	
Québec solidaire	Antoine Côté	450	5.40	
Total valid votes				
Total rejected ballots				
Turnout			27.61	
Electors on the lists			–	–
Parti Québécois gain from Coalition Avenir Québec		Swing		+
Source: Élections Québec

2022 Quebec general election
Party	Candidate	Votes	%	±%
Coalition Avenir Québec	Denis Lamothe	3,132	36.27	+9.76
Québec solidaire	Maïtée Labrecque-Saganash	2,092	24.23	+7.70
Liberal	Tunu Napartuk	1,571	18.19	-6.73
Parti Québécois	Christine Moore	1,084	12.55	-13.42
Conservative	Nancy Lalancette	756	8.76	+6.52
Total valid votes		8,635	96.80	
Total rejected ballots		285	3.20	
Turnout		8,920	30.21	-0.68
Electors on the lists		29,522		

2018 Quebec general election
Party	Candidate	Votes	%	±%
Coalition Avenir Québec	Denis Lamothe	2,270	26.51	+10.00
Parti Québécois	Jonathan Mattson	2,224	25.97	-7.05
Liberal	Jean Boucher	2,134	24.92	-17.42
Québec solidaire	Alisha Tukkiapik	1,416	16.53	+11.83
Conservative	Alexandre Croteau	192	2.24	
Green	Cristina Roos	183	2.14	
New Democratic	Louis R. Couture	145	1.69	
Total valid votes		8,564	97.92	
Total rejected ballots		182	2.08	
Turnout		8,746	30.89	
Eligible voters		28,314		
Coalition Avenir Québec gain from Liberal		Swing		+8.53
These results were subject to a judicial recount, and modified from the validated results in accordance with the Judge's rulings. The initial results declared Denis Lamothe the victor by a margin of 44 votes. The recount resulted in Lamothe keeping the seat by a margin of 46 votes.
Source(s) "Rapport des résultats officiels du scrutin". Élections Québec. "CAQ keeps northern Quebec seat in Ungava recount | CBC News". CBC News. 15 October 2018.

2014 Quebec general election
Party	Candidate	Votes	%	±%
Liberal	Jean Boucher	4,615	42.34	+7.63
Parti Québécois	Luc Ferland	3,599	33.02	-12.51
Coalition Avenir Québec	Michael Donald Cameron	1,800	16.51	+5.48
Québec solidaire	André Richer	512	4.70	-1.45
Option nationale	Zoé Allen-Mercier	235	2.16	-0.44
Parti nul	Matthew Guillemette	140	1.28	–
Total valid votes		10,901	98.14	–
Total rejected ballots		207	1.86	–
Turnout		11,108	41.47	-0.15
Electors on the lists		26,786	–	–
Liberal gain from Parti Québécois		Swing		+10.07

2012 Quebec general election
Party	Candidate	Votes	%	±%
Parti Québécois	Luc Ferland	4,854	45.52	-1.77
Liberal	Gérald Lemoyne	3,701	34.71	+0.09
Coalition Avenir Québec	Stéphane Robichaud	1,176	11.03	+0.49
Québec solidaire	Sylvain Couture	655	6.14	+1.10
Option nationale	Dominic Hamelin-Johnston	277	2.60	–
Total valid votes		10,663	98.18	–
Total rejected ballots		198	1.82	–
Turnout		10,861	41.62	+5.53
Electors on the lists		26,098	–	–
Parti Québécois hold		Swing		-0.93

^ Change is from redistributed results. CAQ change is from ADQ.

2008 Quebec general election
Party	Candidate	Votes	%	±%
Parti Québécois	Luc Ferland	4,119	47.30	+5.89
Liberal	Pierre Gaudreault	3,015	34.62	+2.10
Action démocratique	Pascal Dion	918	10.54	-10.94
Québec solidaire	Mélanie Dufour	439	5.04	+0.44
Independent	Gilbert Hamel	218	2.50	-2.10
Total valid votes		8,709	98.61	–
Total rejected ballots		123	1.39	–
Turnout		8,832	36.09	-10.38
Electors on the lists		24,474	–	–

2007 Quebec general election
Party	Candidate	Votes	%	±%
Parti Québécois	Luc Ferland	4,555	41.41	-8.70
Liberal	Aline Sauvageau	3,577	32.52	-4.63
Action démocratique	Jacques L. Cadieux	2,363	21.48	+8.74
Québec solidaire	Gilbert Hamel	506	4.60	–
Total valid votes		11,001	98.88	–
Total rejected ballots		125	1.12	–
Turnout		11,126	46.47	-4.05
Electors on the lists		23,944	–	–

2003 Quebec general election
Party	Candidate	Votes	%
Parti Québécois	Michel Létourneau	5,744	50.11
Liberal	Donald Don Bubar	4,258	37.15
Action démocratique	Gloria Trudeau	1,460	12.74
Total valid votes		11,462	100.00
Rejected and declined votes		192	
Turnout		11,654	50.52
Electors on the lists		23,067	

1998 Quebec general election
Party	Candidate	Votes	%	±%
Parti Québécois	Michel Létourneau	6,482	48.22	−5.97
Liberal	Claude Eric Gagné	5,517	41.04	+1.04
Action démocratique	Steve Paquette	1,443	10.74	
Total valid votes		13,442	100.00	
Rejected and declined votes		180		
Turnout		13,622	61.93	+10.12
Electors on the lists		21,997		
Source: Official Results, Government of Quebec

1995 Quebec referendum
Side	Votes	%
Non	10,396	53.09
Oui	9,187	46.91

1994 Quebec general election
Party	Candidate	Votes	%	±%
Parti Québécois	Michel Létourneau	7,276	54.19	+3.23
Liberal	Victo Murray	5,371	40.00	-9.04
Green	Thomas DeMarco	407	3.03	–
Natural Law	Steve Paquette	372	2.77	–

1992 Charlottetown Accord referendum
Side	Votes	%
Non	10,549	62.08
Oui	6,444	37.92

1989 Quebec general election
Party	Candidate	Votes	%	±%
Parti Québécois	Christian Claveau	6,442	50.96	-0.88
Liberal	Jacques Bérubé	6,199	49.04	+4.62

1985 Quebec general election
Party	Candidate	Votes	%	±%
Parti Québécois	Christian Claveau	6,414	51.84	-9.69
Liberal	Jacques Bérubé	5,497	44.42	+5.95
Christian Socialist	Denis Turgeon	463	3.74	–

1981 Quebec general election
Party	Candidate	Votes	%
Parti Québécois	Marcel Lafrenière	9,679	61.53
Liberal	Laurent Levasseur	6,052	38.47

== See also ==
- List of Quebec provincial electoral districts
- Canadian provincial electoral districts
