= Baie-d'Hudson, Quebec =

Baie-d'Hudson
- Unorganized territory
- Location within Quebec
- Coordinates: 58°30′N 75°00′W
- Country: Canada
- Province: Quebec
- Region: Nord-du-Québec
- TE: Kativik
- Constituted: unspecified

Government
  - Federal riding: Abitibi—Baie-James—Nunavik—Eeyou
  - Prov. riding: Ungava

Area
  - Total: 156,370.40 km^{2} (60,374.95 sq mi)
  - Land: 120,831.34 km^{2} (46,653.24 sq mi)

Population (2021)
  - Total: 5
  - Density: 0/km^{2} (0/sq mi)
  - Change (2016–21): N/A
  - Dwellings: 3
- Time zone: UTC−5 (EST)
  - Summer (DST): UTC−4 (EDT)

Baie-d'Hudson is a very large unorganized territory in the Kativik Regional Government territory in the Nord-du-Québec region of Quebec. It is named after Hudson Bay.

It consists of nearly the entire western part of northernmost Quebec. Bordering it to the east is the other large unorganized territory in Kativik, Rivière-Koksoak.

Its population in the Canada 2021 Census was 5; enclaved within it, however, are various northern villages (i.e., Inuit communities), a Cree reserved land, and a Cree village municipality. In the 2011 census it had a population of 0.

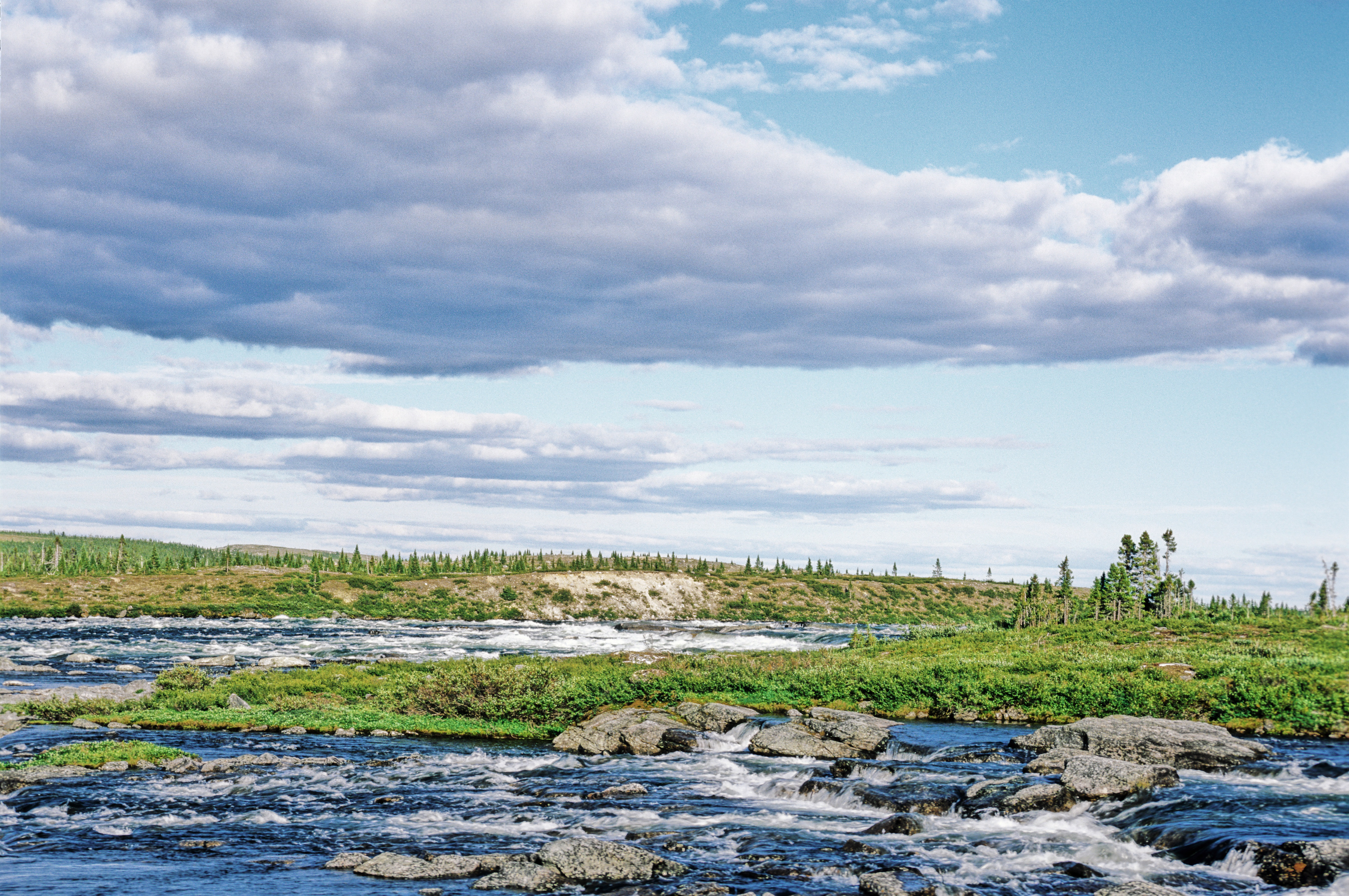

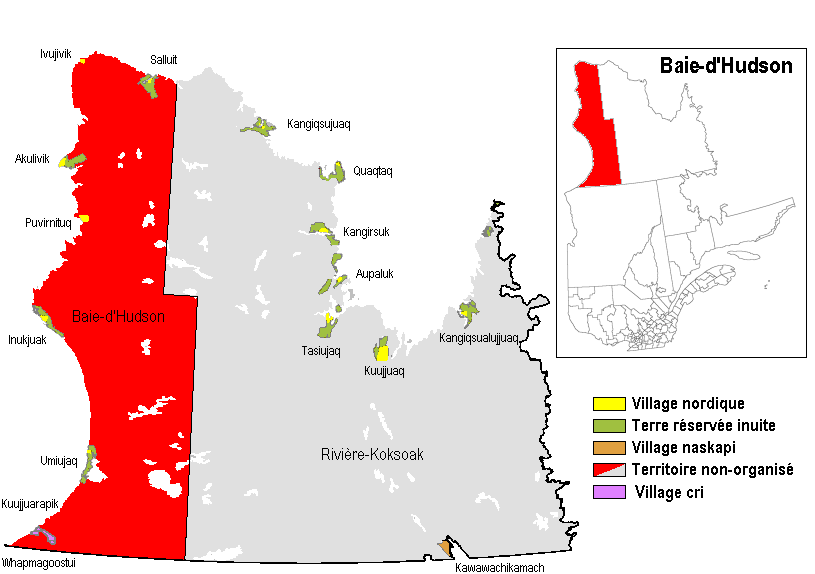
