= Sonia Caron =

Quebec politician

Sonia Caron MNA

Member of the National Assembly for Ungava
- Incumbent
- Assumed office October 5, 2026
- Preceded by: Denis Lamothe

Personal details
- Party: Parti Québécois

Sonia Caron is a Quebec politician who was the elected to the National Assembly of Quebec for Ungava in the 2026 Quebec general election as a member of the Parti Québécois. She represents the largest constituency in the province and comes from Chibougamau. Caron is the director of a trades training program and sat on the Assembly of Partners of the Société du Plan Nord.

== Electoral record ==
2026 Quebec general election: Ungava
** Preliminary results — Not yet official **
| Party | Candidate | Votes | % | ±% |
|---|---|---|---|---|
| Parti Québécois | Sonia Caron | 3,272 | 39.23 | |
| Liberal | Sandrine Rioux | 2,309 | 27.68 | |
| Conservative | Marc Damant | 1,447 | 17.35 | |
| Coalition Avenir Québec | Amélie Béchard | 863 | 10.35 | |
| Québec solidaire | Antoine Côté | 450 | 5.40 | |
| Total valid votes | | | | |
| Total rejected ballots | | | | |
| Turnout | | | 27.61 | |
| Electors on the lists | | | – | – |
| Parti Québécois gain from Coalition Avenir Québec | | Swing | | + |
Source: Élections Québec
