= Denis Lamothe =

Canadian politician

Member of the National Assembly of Quebec for Ungava
- In office October 1, 2018 – August 27, 2026
- Preceded by: Jean Boucher
- Succeeded by: Sonia Caron

Personal details
- Born: 1958 Trois-Rivières, Quebec
- Party: Coalition Avenir Québec

Denis Lamothe is a Canadian politician, who was elected to the National Assembly of Quebec in the 2018 provincial election. He represented the electoral district of Ungava as a member of the Coalition Avenir Québec. He did not seek re-election in the 2026 general election.

A former Sûreté du Québec officer in Kuujjuaq and Kuujjuaraapik, he promised in his campaign to be an advocate for greater self-determination rights for the Nunavik region of Quebec.

== Electoral record ==
2022 Quebec general election: Ungava
Party	Candidate	Votes	%	±%
Coalition Avenir Québec	Denis Lamothe	3,132	36.27	+9.76
Québec solidaire	Maïtée Labrecque-Saganash	2,092	24.23	+7.70
Liberal	Tunu Napartuk	1,571	18.19	-6.73
Parti Québécois	Christine Moore	1,084	12.55	-13.42
Conservative	Nancy Lalancette	756	8.76	+6.52
Total valid votes		8,635	96.80	
Total rejected ballots		285	3.20	
Turnout		8,920	30.21	-0.68
Electors on the lists		29,522		

2018 Quebec general election: Ungava
Party	Candidate	Votes	%	±%
Coalition Avenir Québec	Denis Lamothe	2,270	26.51	+10.00
Parti Québécois	Jonathan Mattson	2,224	25.97	-7.05
Liberal	Jean Boucher	2,134	24.92	-17.42
Québec solidaire	Alisha Tukkiapik	1,416	16.53	+11.83
Conservative	Alexandre Croteau	192	2.24	
Green	Cristina Roos	183	2.14	
New Democratic	Louis R. Couture	145	1.69	
Total valid votes		8,564	97.92	
Total rejected ballots		182	2.08	
Turnout		8,746	30.89	
Eligible voters		28,314		
Coalition Avenir Québec gain from Liberal		Swing		+8.53
These results were subject to a judicial recount, and modified from the validated results in accordance with the Judge's rulings. The initial results declared Denis Lamothe the victor by a margin of 44 votes. The recount resulted in Lamothe keeping the seat by a margin of 46 votes.
Source(s) "Rapport des résultats officiels du scrutin". Élections Québec. "CAQ keeps northern Quebec seat in Ungava recount | CBC News". CBC News. October 15, 2018.
