= Rivière-Koksoak, Quebec =

Rivière-Koksoak
- Unorganized territory
- Location within Quebec
- Coordinates: 57°10′N 69°20′W
- Country: Canada
- Province: Quebec
- Region: Nord-du-Québec
- TE: Kativik
- Constituted: January 1, 1986

Government
  - Federal riding: Abitibi—Baie-James—Nunavik—Eeyou
  - Prov. riding: Duplessis and Ungava

Area
  - Total: 346,429.30 km^{2} (133,757.10 sq mi)
  - Land: 307,039.90 km^{2} (118,548.77 sq mi)

Population (2011)
  - Total: 0
  - Density: 0/km^{2} (0/sq mi)
  - Change (2006–11): ▼100.0%
  - Dwellings: 0
- Time zone: UTC−5 (EST)
  - Summer (DST): UTC−4 (EDT)

Rivière-Koksoak is a very large unorganized territory in the Kativik Regional Government territory in the Nord-du-Québec region of Quebec. It is named after the Koksoak River.

It consists of nearly the entire eastern part of northernmost Quebec. Bordering it to the west is the other large unorganized territory in Kativik, Baie-d'Hudson.

Its population in the Canada 2011 Census was 0; enclaved within it, however, are various northern villages (i.e., Inuit communities) and one (uninhabited) Naskapi village municipality. In the 2006 census it had a population of 15.

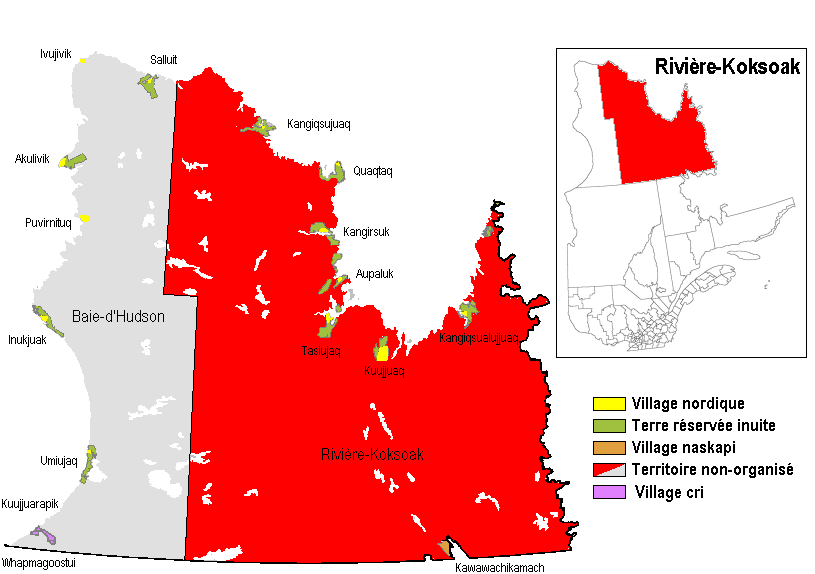
