= Luc Ferland =

Canadian politician

MNA for Ungava
- In office April 25, 2007 – 2014
- Preceded by: Michel Létourneau
- Succeeded by: Jean Boucher

Personal details
- Party: Parti Québécois
- Portfolio: Northern development, aboriginal affairs

Luc Ferland is a Canadian politician, who was a Parti Québécois member of the National Assembly of Quebec for the riding of Ungava from 2007 to 2014.

Ferland attended the Université du Québec en Abitibi-Temiscamingue and obtained a degree in animation, and also studied at the Université du Québec à Chicoutimi in project management. He was the political aide of outgoing MNA Michel Létourneau. He was also the director of the CRD of Baie-James and a commissioner at the Baie James School Board.

Ferland was elected in Ungava in the 2007 elections succeeding Letourneau who was also representing the northern Quebec riding. He was named the PQ critic for northern development and aboriginal affairs.

Ferland ran unsuccessfully for the Bloc Quebecois in the riding of Abitibi—Baie-James—Nunavik—Eeyou in the federal election of 2015.

== Electoral record ==
=== Abitibi—Baie-James—Nunavik—Eeyou ===
2015 Canadian federal election
| Party | Candidate | Votes | % | ±% | Expenditures |
|---|---|---|---|---|---|
| New Democratic | Roméo Saganash | 12,778 | 37.0 | -7.82 | – |
| Liberal | Pierre Dufour | 11,094 | 32.1 | +21.63 | – |
| Bloc Québécois | Luc Ferland | 6,398 | 18.5 | +0.23 | – |
| Conservative | Steven Hébert | 3,211 | 9.3 | -13.25 | – |
| Green | Patrick Benoît | 779 | 2.3 | -1.59 | – |
| Rhinoceros | Mario Gagnon | 258 | 0.7 | – | – |
| Total valid votes/expense limit | | 34,518 | 100.0 | | $247,074.94 |
| Total rejected ballots | | 609 | – | – | |
| Turnout | | 35,127 | 55.55 | – | |
| Eligible voters | | 63,226 | | | |
| New Democratic hold | | Swing | | -14.73 | |
Source: Elections Canada

=== Ungava ===
2014 Quebec general election
| Party | Candidate | Votes | % | ±% |
|---|---|---|---|---|
| Liberal | Jean Boucher | 4,615 | 42.34 | +7.63 |
| Parti Québécois | Luc Ferland | 3,599 | 33.02 | -12.51 |
| Coalition Avenir Québec | Michael Donald Cameron | 1,800 | 16.51 | +5.48 |
| Québec solidaire | André Richer | 512 | 4.70 | -1.45 |
| Option nationale | Zoé Allen-Mercier | 235 | 2.16 | -0.44 |
| Parti nul | Matthew Guillemette | 140 | 1.28 | – |
| Total valid votes | | 10,901 | 98.14 | – |
| Total rejected ballots | | 207 | 1.86 | – |
| Turnout | | 11,108 | 41.47 | -0.15 |
| Electors on the lists | | 26,786 | – | – |
| Liberal gain from Parti Québécois | | Swing | | +10.07 |

2012 Quebec general election
| Party | Candidate | Votes | % | ±% |
|---|---|---|---|---|
| Parti Québécois | Luc Ferland | 4,854 | 45.52 | -1.77 |
| Liberal | Gérald Lemoyne | 3,701 | 34.71 | +0.09 |
| Coalition Avenir Québec | Stéphane Robichaud | 1,176 | 11.03 | +0.49 |
| Québec solidaire | Sylvain Couture | 655 | 6.14 | +1.10 |
| Option nationale | Dominic Hamelin-Johnston | 277 | 2.60 | – |
| Total valid votes | | 10,663 | 98.18 | – |
| Total rejected ballots | | 198 | 1.82 | – |
| Turnout | | 10,861 | 41.62 | +5.53 |
| Electors on the lists | | 26,098 | – | – |
| Parti Québécois hold | | Swing | | -0.93 |

^ Change is from redistributed results. CAQ change is from ADQ.

2008 Quebec general election
| Party | Candidate | Votes | % | ±% |
|---|---|---|---|---|
| Parti Québécois | Luc Ferland | 4,119 | 47.30 | +5.89 |
| Liberal | Pierre Gaudreault | 3,015 | 34.62 | +2.10 |
| Action démocratique | Pascal Dion | 918 | 10.54 | -10.94 |
| Québec solidaire | Mélanie Dufour | 439 | 5.04 | +0.44 |
| Independent | Gilbert Hamel | 218 | 2.50 | -2.10 |
| Total valid votes | | 8,709 | 98.61 | – |
| Total rejected ballots | | 123 | 1.39 | – |
| Turnout | | 8,832 | 36.09 | -10.38 |
| Electors on the lists | | 24,474 | – | – |

2007 Quebec general election
| Party | Candidate | Votes | % | ±% |
|---|---|---|---|---|
| Parti Québécois | Luc Ferland | 4,555 | 41.41 | -8.70 |
| Liberal | Aline Sauvageau | 3,577 | 32.52 | -4.63 |
| Action démocratique | Jacques L. Cadieux | 2,363 | 21.48 | +8.74 |
| Québec solidaire | Gilbert Hamel | 506 | 4.60 | – |
| Total valid votes | | 11,001 | 98.88 | – |
| Total rejected ballots | | 125 | 1.12 | – |
| Turnout | | 11,126 | 46.47 | -4.05 |
| Electors on the lists | | 23,944 | – | – |
