= Jean Boucher (MNA) =

Canadian politician in Quebec

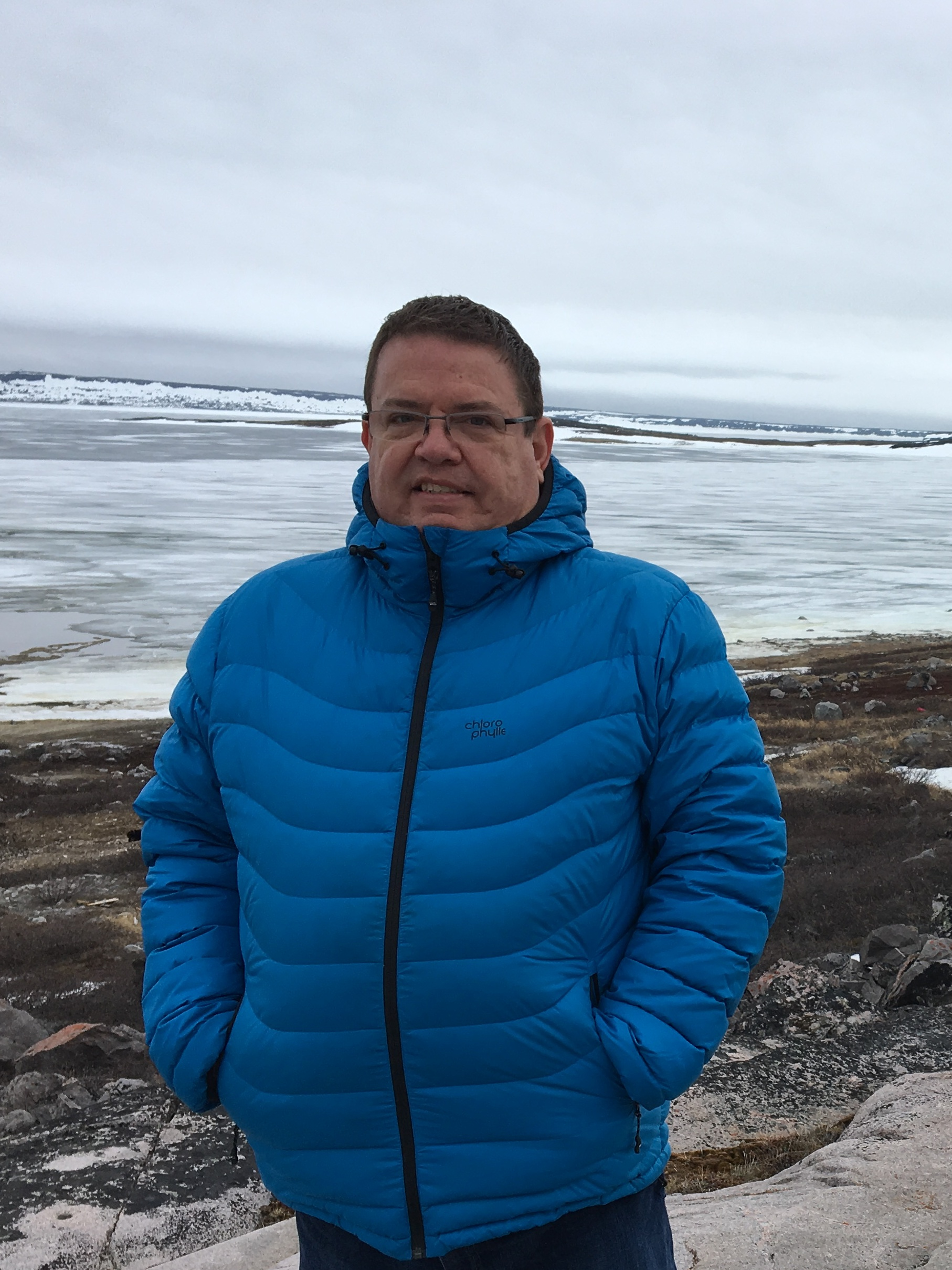
- Jean Boucher, 2018

Member of the National Assembly of Quebec for Ungava
- In office April 7, 2014 – August 29, 2018
- Preceded by: Luc Ferland
- Succeeded by: Denis Lamothe

Personal details
- Party: Quebec Liberal Party

Jean Boucher is a Canadian politician in Quebec, who was elected to the National Assembly of Quebec in the 2014 election. He represented the electoral district of Ungava as a member of the Quebec Liberal Party.

Prior to his election to the legislature, Boucher worked as a lawyer and as an administrator of low-income housing for the Kativik Municipal Housing Office in Kuujjuaq.

== Electoral record ==
2018 Quebec general election: Ungava
Party	Candidate	Votes	%	±%
Coalition Avenir Québec	Denis Lamothe	2,270	26.51	+10.00
Parti Québécois	Jonathan Mattson	2,224	25.97	-7.05
Liberal	Jean Boucher	2,134	24.92	-17.42
Québec solidaire	Alisha Tukkiapik	1,416	16.53	+11.83
Conservative	Alexandre Croteau	192	2.24	
Green	Cristina Roos	183	2.14	
New Democratic	Louis R. Couture	145	1.69	
Total valid votes		8,564	97.92	
Total rejected ballots		182	2.08	
Turnout		8,746	30.89	
Eligible voters		28,314		
Coalition Avenir Québec gain from Liberal		Swing		+8.53
These results were subject to a judicial recount, and modified from the validated results in accordance with the Judge's rulings. The initial results declared Denis Lamothe the victor by a margin of 44 votes. The recount resulted in Lamothe keeping the seat by a margin of 46 votes.
Source(s) "Rapport des résultats officiels du scrutin". Élections Québec. "CAQ keeps northern Quebec seat in Ungava recount | CBC News". CBC News. October 15, 2018.

2014 Quebec general election
Party	Candidate	Votes	%	±%
Liberal	Jean Boucher	4,615	42.34	+7.63
Parti Québécois	Luc Ferland	3,599	33.02	-12.51
Coalition Avenir Québec	Michael Donald Cameron	1,800	16.51	+5.48
Québec solidaire	André Richer	512	4.70	-1.45
Option nationale	Zoé Allen-Mercier	235	2.16	-0.44
Parti nul	Matthew Guillemette	140	1.28	–
Total valid votes		10,901	98.14	–
Total rejected ballots		207	1.86	–
Turnout		11,108	41.47	-0.15
Electors on the lists		26,786	–	–
Liberal gain from Parti Québécois		Swing		+10.07
