= Couture crater =

Lake in Northern Quebec, Canada

Couture Crater
- Lac Couture
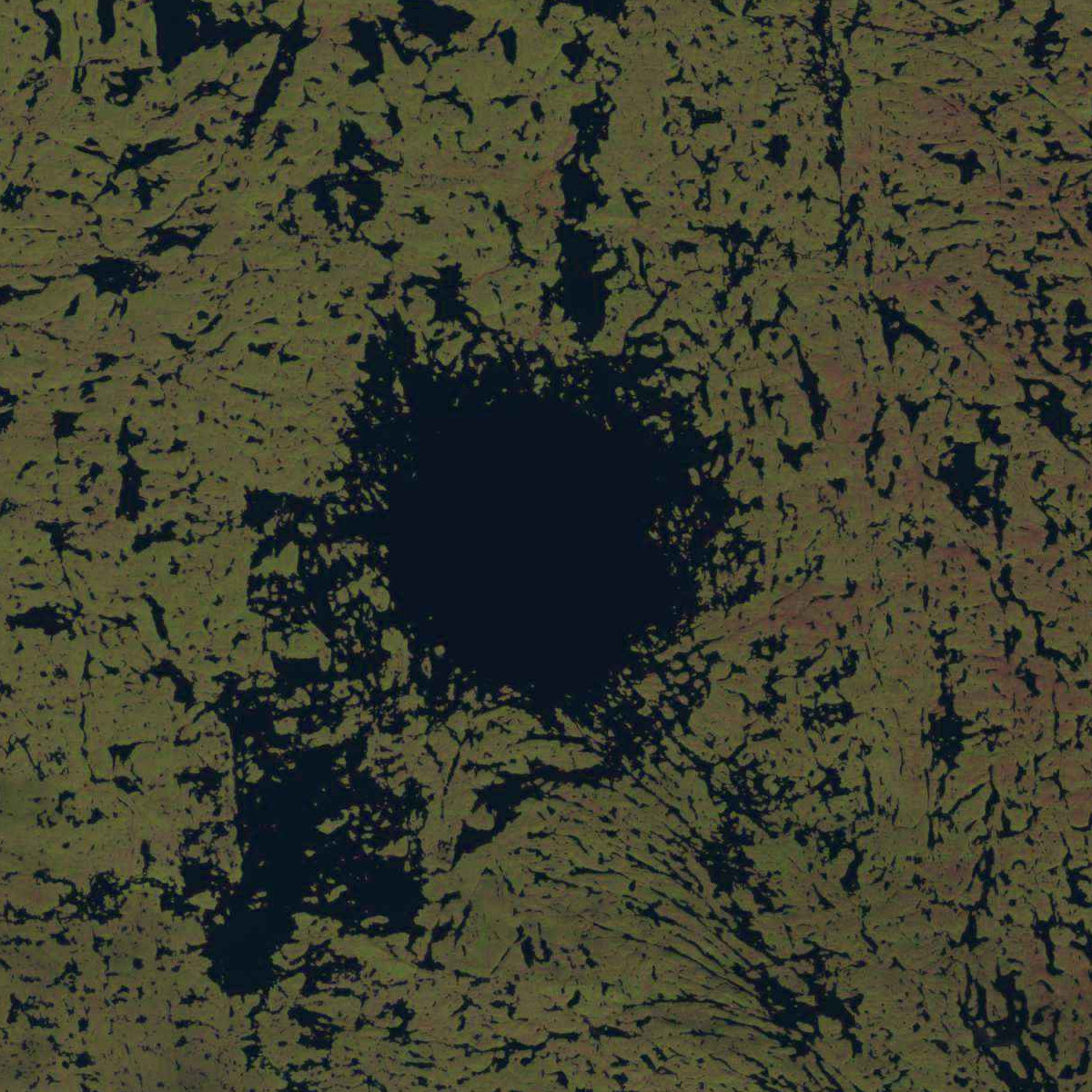
- Landsat image of Couture Crater, 2015

- Location within Quebec
- Location: Quebec, Canada; 60°08′N 75°18′W

Impact crater structure
- Confidence: Confirmed
- Diameter: c. 8 km
- Depth: c. 150 meters
- Age: c. 430 million years
- Exposed: Yes

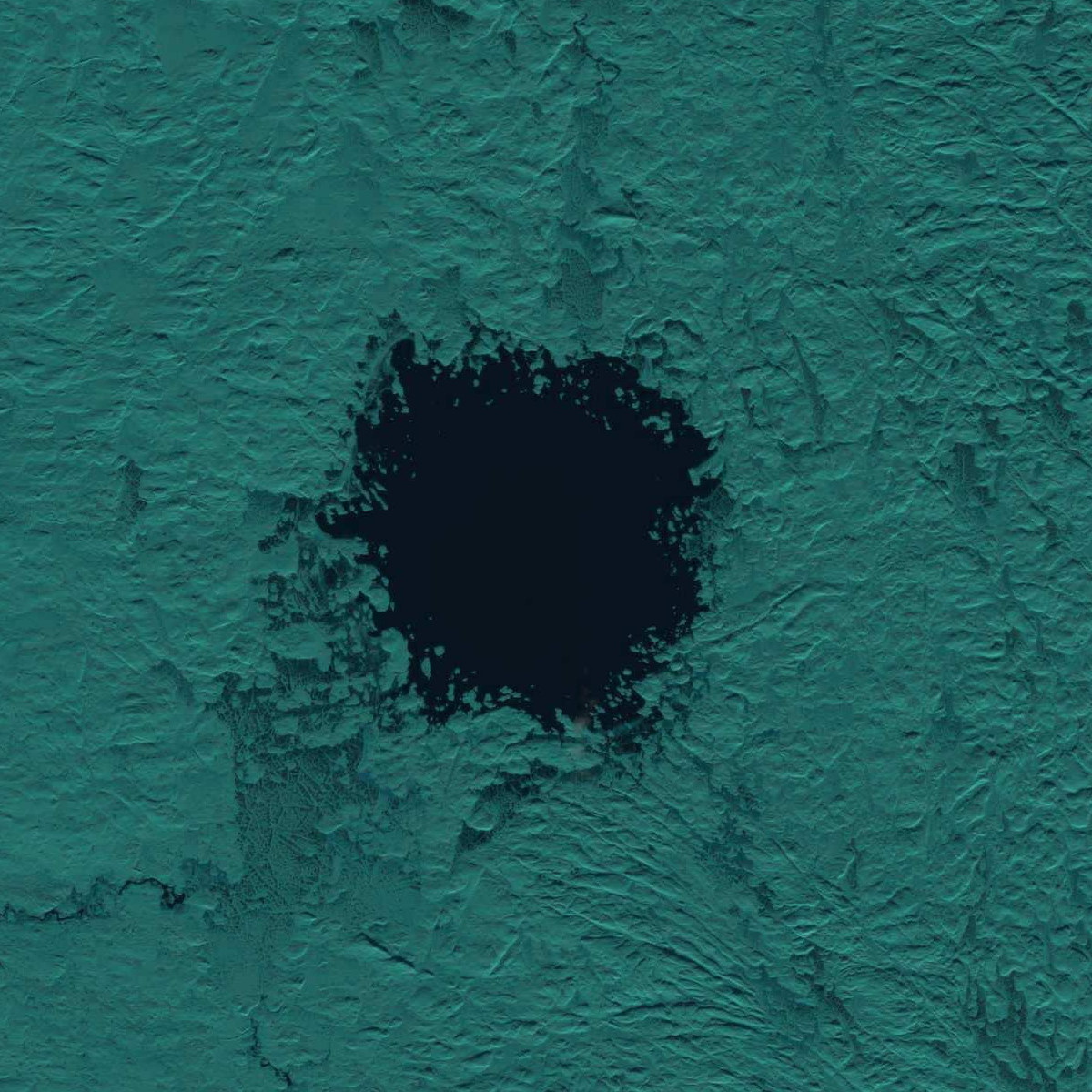
Couture Crater in 2015

Couture Crater is a crater in Northern Quebec, Canada. It was filled with water, making it also a lake. It is located near Hudson Bay in the Kativik territory. The crater is around 150 meters deep.

Most of the lake covers an 8 km in diameter impact crater. The crater is estimated to have formed around 430 ± 25 million years ago. Breccia, suggesting impact origin, is present in boulders at the surface on islands around the perimeter of the lake. There is also a 25-meter central uplift in the lake floor, suggesting complex crater morphology.
