= Kawawachikamach (Naskapi village municipality) =

Kawawachikamach ᑲᐛᐛᒋᑲᒪᒡ
- Naskapi village municipality
- Location within Quebec Location within Canada
- Coordinates: 54°51′20″N 66°45′50″W
- Country: Canada
- Province: Quebec
- Region: Nord-du-Québec
- Territory: Kativik
- Constituted: September 10, 1981

Government
  - Mayor: Pillip Einish
  - Federal riding: Abitibi—Baie-James—Nunavik—Eeyou
  - Prov. riding: Duplessis

Area
  - Total: 281.10 km^{2} (108.53 sq mi)
  - Land: 242.09 km^{2} (93.47 sq mi)

Population (2011)
  - Total: 0
  - Density: 0/km^{2} (0/sq mi)
  - Change (2006–11): N/A
  - Dwellings: 0
- Time zone: UTC−5 (EST)
  - Summer (DST): UTC−4 (EDT)
- Postal code(s): G0G 2Z0
- Area codes: 418 and 581
- Website: www.naskapi.ca

Kawawachikamach (Naskapi: ᑲᐛᐛᒋᑲᒪᒡ) is a Naskapi village municipality in the territory of the Kativik Regional Government in northern Quebec. It is the only Naskapi village municipality, but nevertheless has a distinct legal status and classification from other kinds of village municipalities in Quebec: Cree village municipalities, northern villages (Inuit communities), and ordinary villages.

There is a counterpart Naskapi reserved land of the same name: Kawawachikamach, located some distance to the south. Because the village municipality is north of the 55th parallel and the reserved land is south of it, they are actually in different administrative regions of Quebec: Nord-du-Québec (within Kativik) and Côte-Nord, respectively.

Despite the title of "village municipality" and the formalities that go along with it (for instance, having a mayor), this is actually an uninhabited area with no resident population: the Naskapi population all live on the reserved land, and the village municipality is for the exclusive use of Naskapis for hunting or other economic activities.

== Demographics ==
In the 2021 Census of Population conducted by Statistics Canada, Kawawachikamach had a population of 0 living in 0 of its 0 total private dwellings, no change from its 2016 population of 0. With a land area of 234.8 km^{2} (90.7 sq mi), it had a population density of 0.0/km^{2} (0.0/sq mi) in 2021.

== See also ==
- List of anglophone communities in Quebec
