= Puvirnituq =

Inuit Northern village in Nunavik, Quebec

Puvirnituq ᐳᕕᕐᓂᑐᖅ
- Northern village municipality
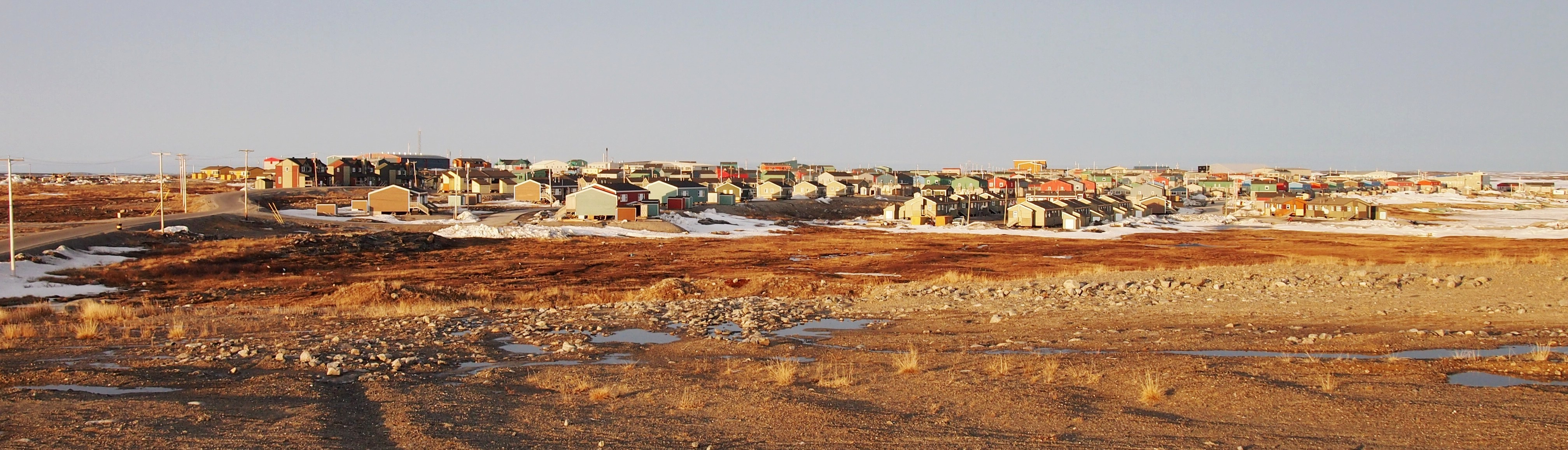

- Location within Quebec
- Coordinates: 60°02′N 077°17′W
- Country: Canada
- Province: Quebec
- Region: Nord-du-Québec; Nunavik
- Equivalent territory (TE): Kativik
- Constituted: September 2, 1989

Government
  - Mayor: Levi Amarualik
  - Federal riding: Abitibi—Baie-James—Nunavik—Eeyou
  - Provincial riding: Ungava

Area
  - Total: 111.44 km^{2} (43.03 sq mi)
  - Land: 81.61 km^{2} (31.51 sq mi)

Population (2021)
  - Total: 2,129
  - Density: 26.1/km^{2} (68/sq mi)
  - Change (2016–21): ▲19.7%
  - Dwellings: 697
- Time zone: UTC−05:00 (EST)
  - Summer (DST): UTC−04:00 (EDT)
- Postal code(s): J0M 1P0
- Area code: 819
- Website: www.nvpuvirnituq.ca

Puvirnituq (Inuktitut: ᐳᕕᕐᓂᑐᖅ), also known by its previously official name of Povungnituk, is a northern village (Inuit community) in Nunavik, on the Povungnituk River near its mouth on Hudson Bay in northern Quebec, Canada. Its population was 2,129 as of the 2021 Canadian census.

Of all other northern villages in Nunavik (VN), only Puvirnituq has no Inuit reserved land (TI) of the same name associated with it.

The name means "putrefied" and is said to have arisen after an epidemic killed off most of the area's residents to the point that there were not enough people to bury the dead, which allowed the exposed bodies to decompose and gave off a putrid smell.

Puvirnituq is the aviation hub of the Hudson Bay coast. Puvirnituq Airport handles scheduled flights to and from all other Hudson Bay coastal communities in Quebec, Montreal, and Ottawa. It is not accessible by road.

The police services in Puvirnituq are provided by the Nunavik Police Service.

== History ==
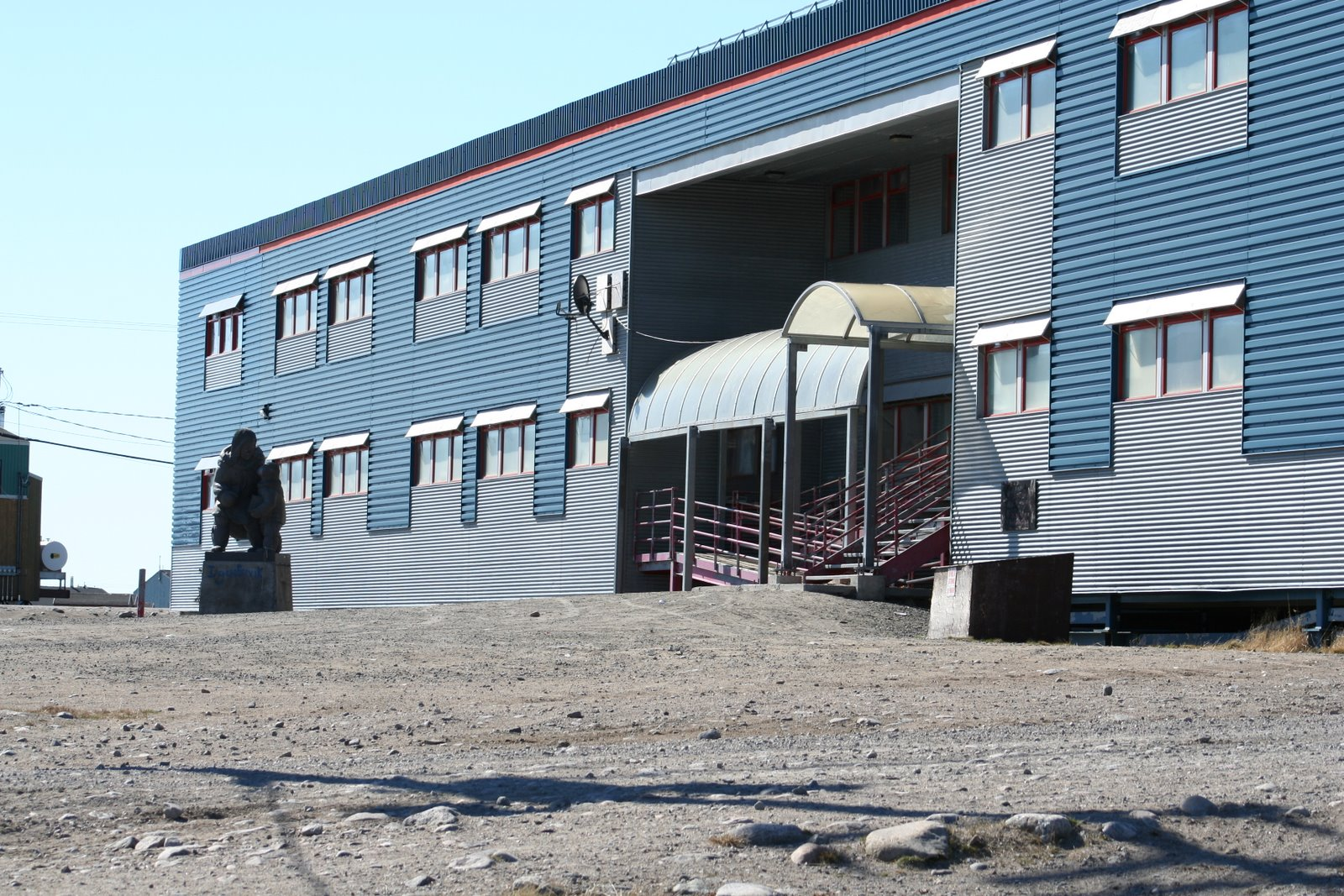
Iguarsivik School in Puvirnituq

In 1921, the Hudson's Bay Company (HBC) established a trading post in the village, known as Povungnituk and often shortened to Pov. This attracted the settlement of Inuit living in the region. In 1951, the HBC opened a general store. The closure of HBC stores in other nearby villages led to an influx of Inuit to Puvirnituq.

A Catholic mission was founded in 1956, which encouraged the residents to form the Carvers Association of Povungnituk two years later. It later became the Co-operative Association of Povungnituk and was instrumental in assisting, developing, and marketing Inuit art. Its success inspired other Inuit communities to form similar cooperatives, most of which now make up the Federation of Co-operatives of Northern Quebec. Leah Nuvalinga Qumaluk was among the artists who worked at the cooperative.

== Demographics ==
In the 2021 Census of Population conducted by Statistics Canada, Puvirnituq had a population of 2,129 living in 547 of its 697 total private dwellings, a change of 19.7% from its 2016 population of 1,779. With a land area of 81.61 km^{2} (31.51 sq mi), it had a population density of 26.1/km^{2} (67.6/sq mi) in 2021.

Historical census populations – Puvirnituq

| Year | Pop. | ±% |
|---|---|---|
| 1986 | 868 | — |
| 1991 | 1,091 | +25.7% |
| 1996 | 1,169 | +7.1% |
| 2001 | 1,287 | +10.1% |

| Year | Pop. | ±% |
|---|---|---|
| 2006 | 1,457 | +13.2% |
| 2011 | 1,692 | +16.1% |
| 2016 | 1,779 | +5.1% |
| 2021 | 2,129 | +19.7% |

Source: Statistics Canada

== Education ==
The Kativik Ilisarniliriniq operates three schools in Puvirnituq. Ikaarvik Primary School for K-3, Iguarsivik Primary-Secondary School for grades 4 through Secondary 5, and the Adult Education Centre.

In 1980 there was a community boycott against the Kativik School Board as people in the community disliked the James Bay Agreement and therefore shunned the school district as they perceived it as close to the people who accepted the agreement. That year, the government of Quebec planned to open its own school there.

== Notable people ==
Inuk throat singer and activist Shina Novalinga (born 1998), a social media personality gained fame for posting videos throat singing with her mother on TikTok and Instagram. As of August 2022, she has over 4 million TikTok followers and over 2 million Instagram followers. Other people from Puvirnituq include Mary Pudlat (1923–2001), a visual artist.

== Gallery ==
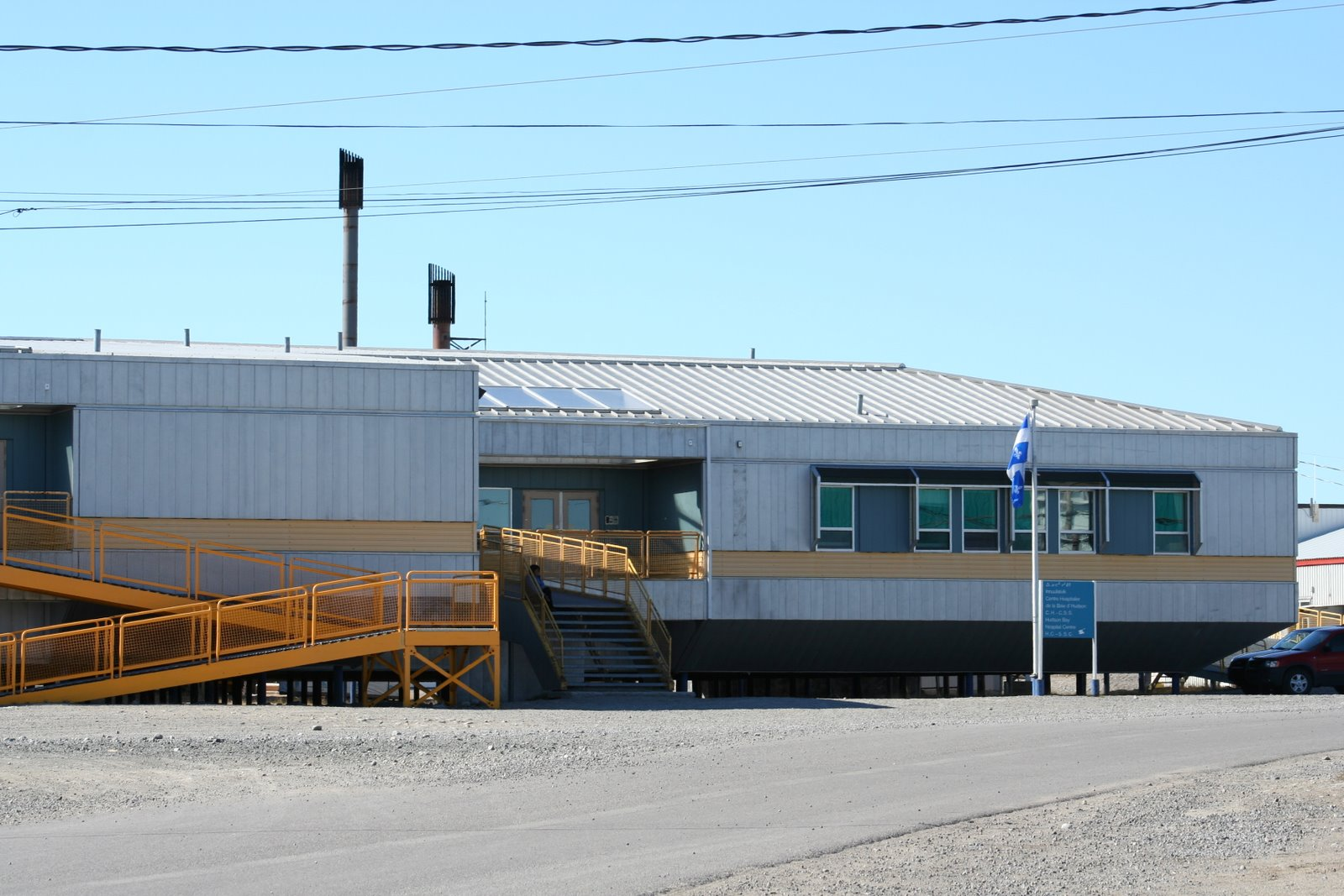
Hospital

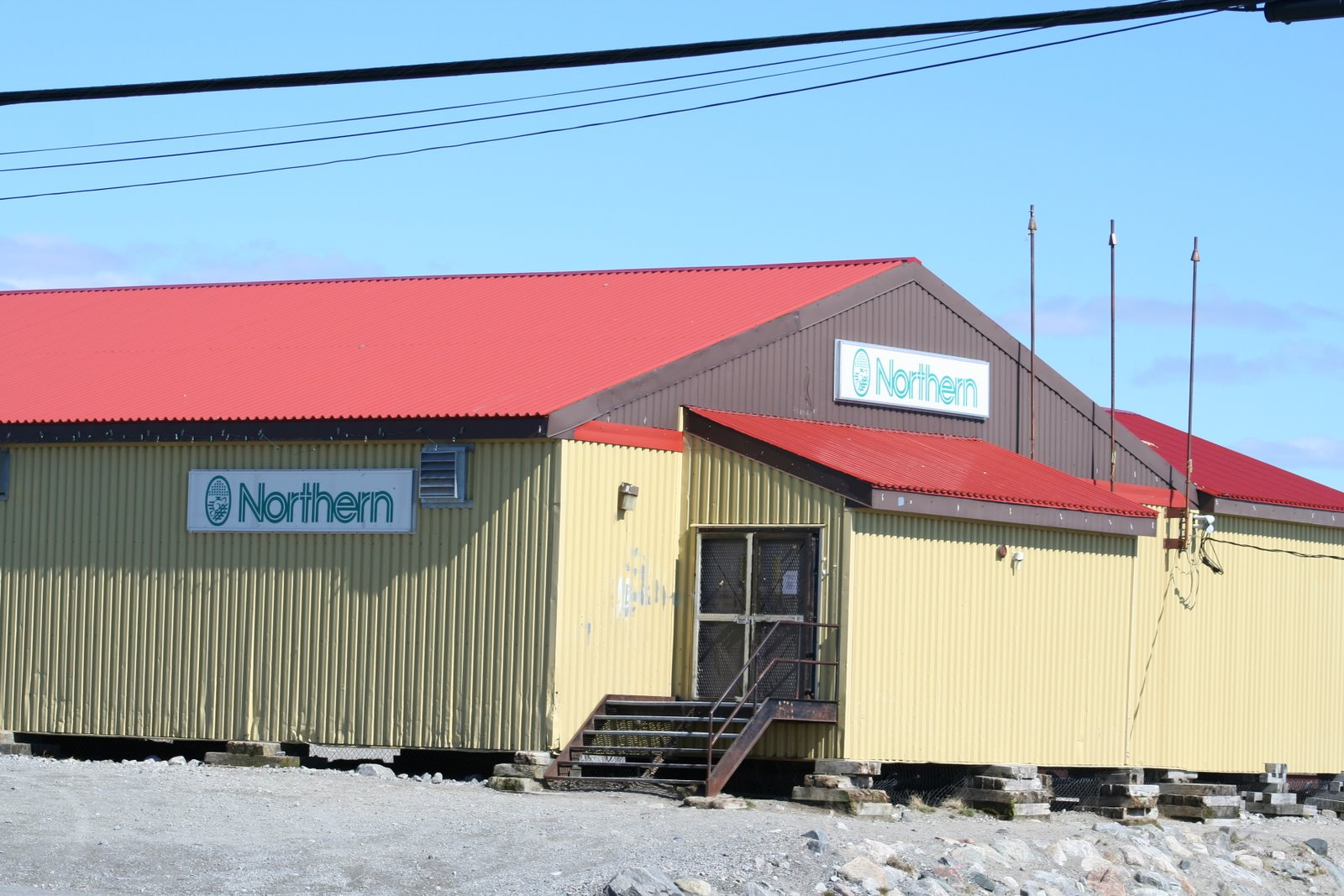
Northern Store

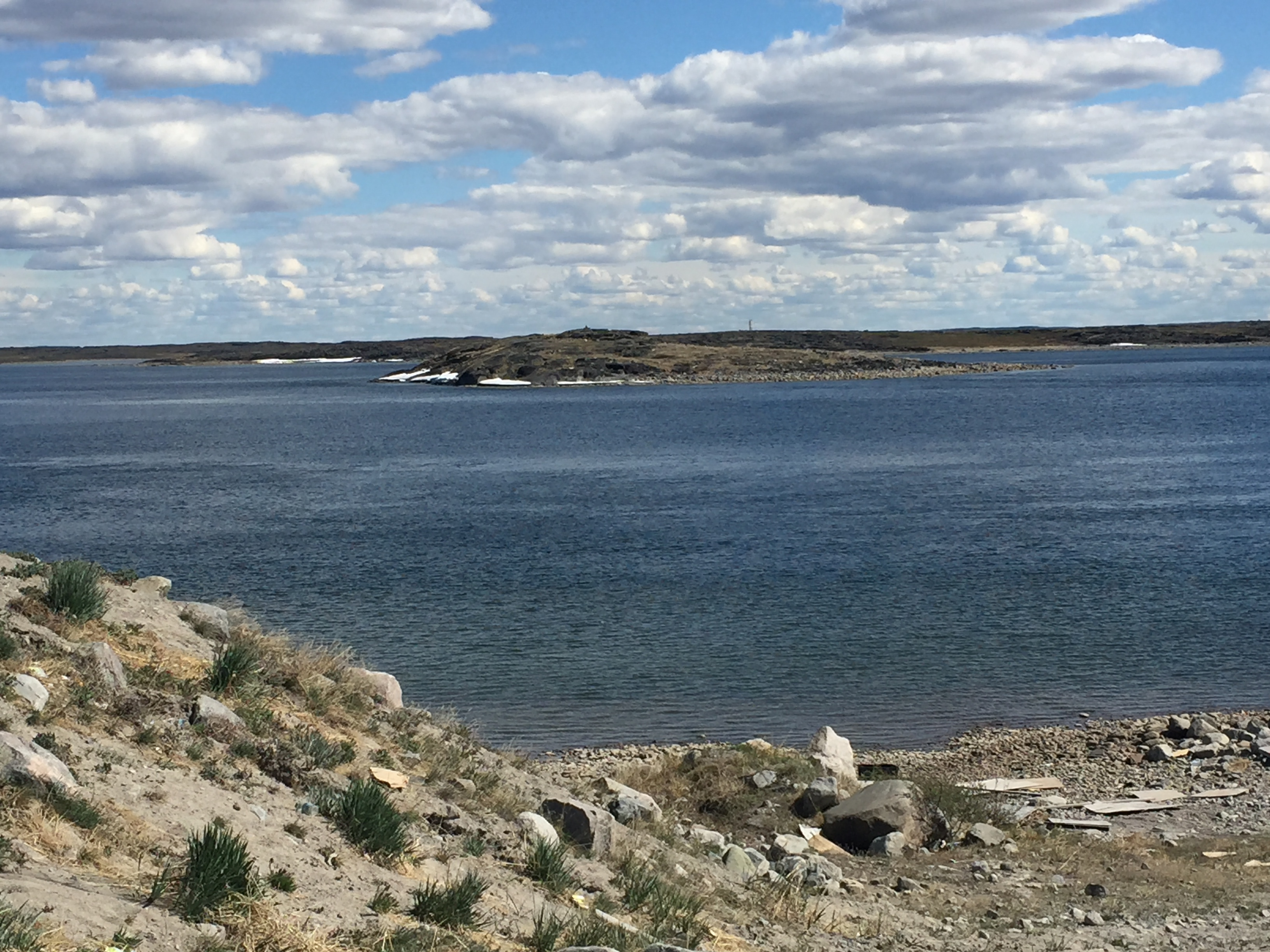
View of Puvirnituq River

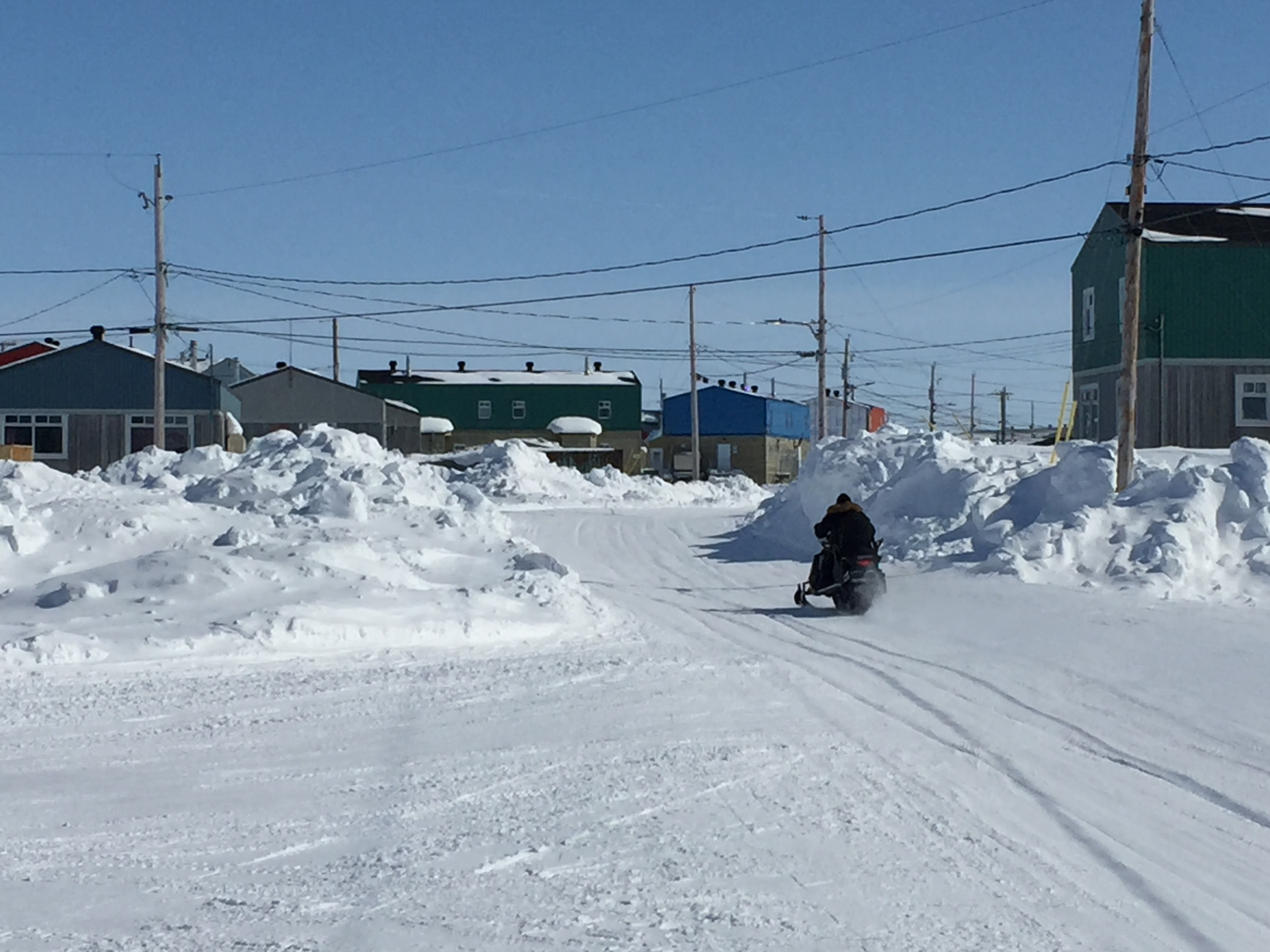
Street view in winter

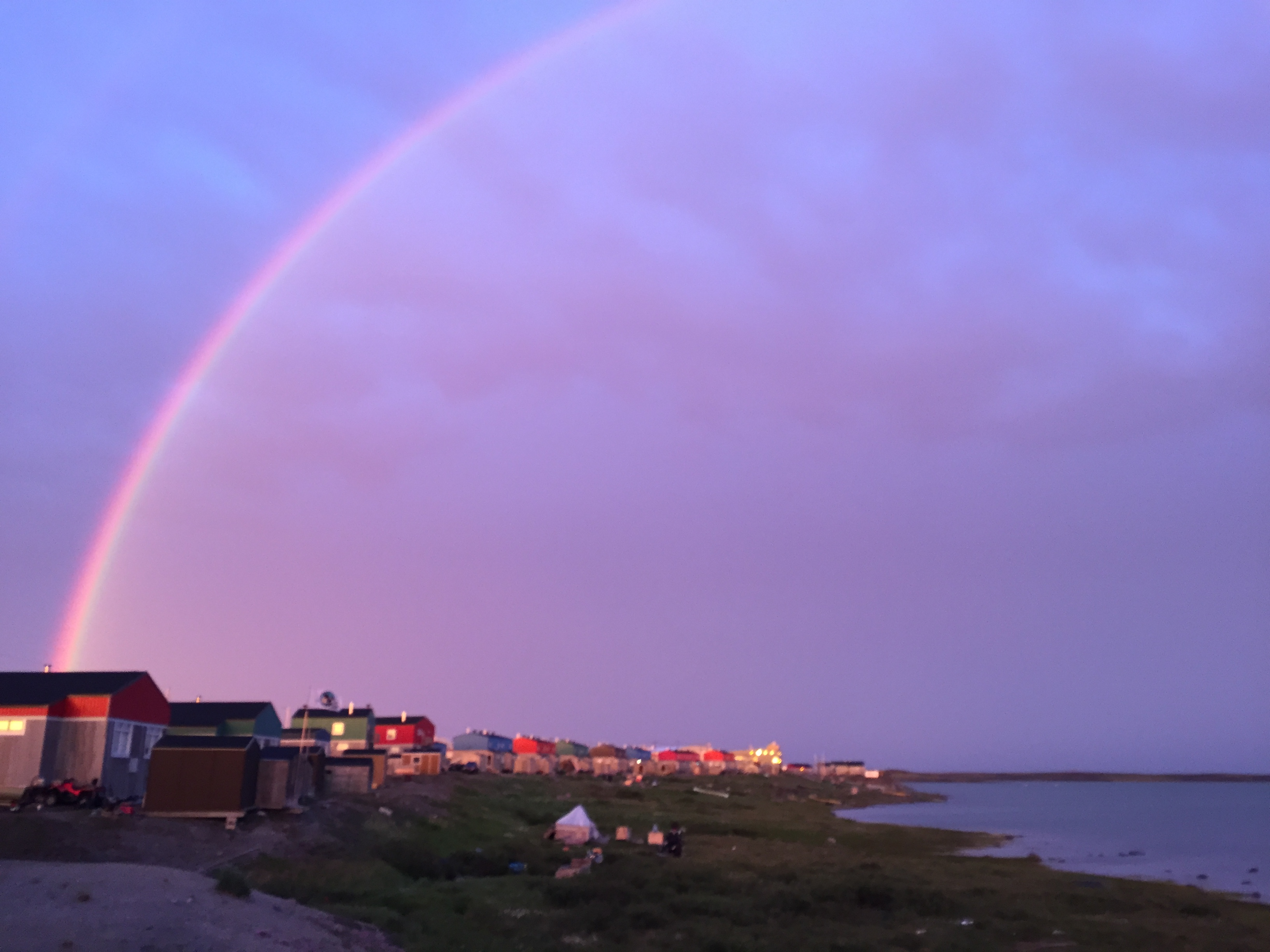
The village near the North bank of Puvirnituq River

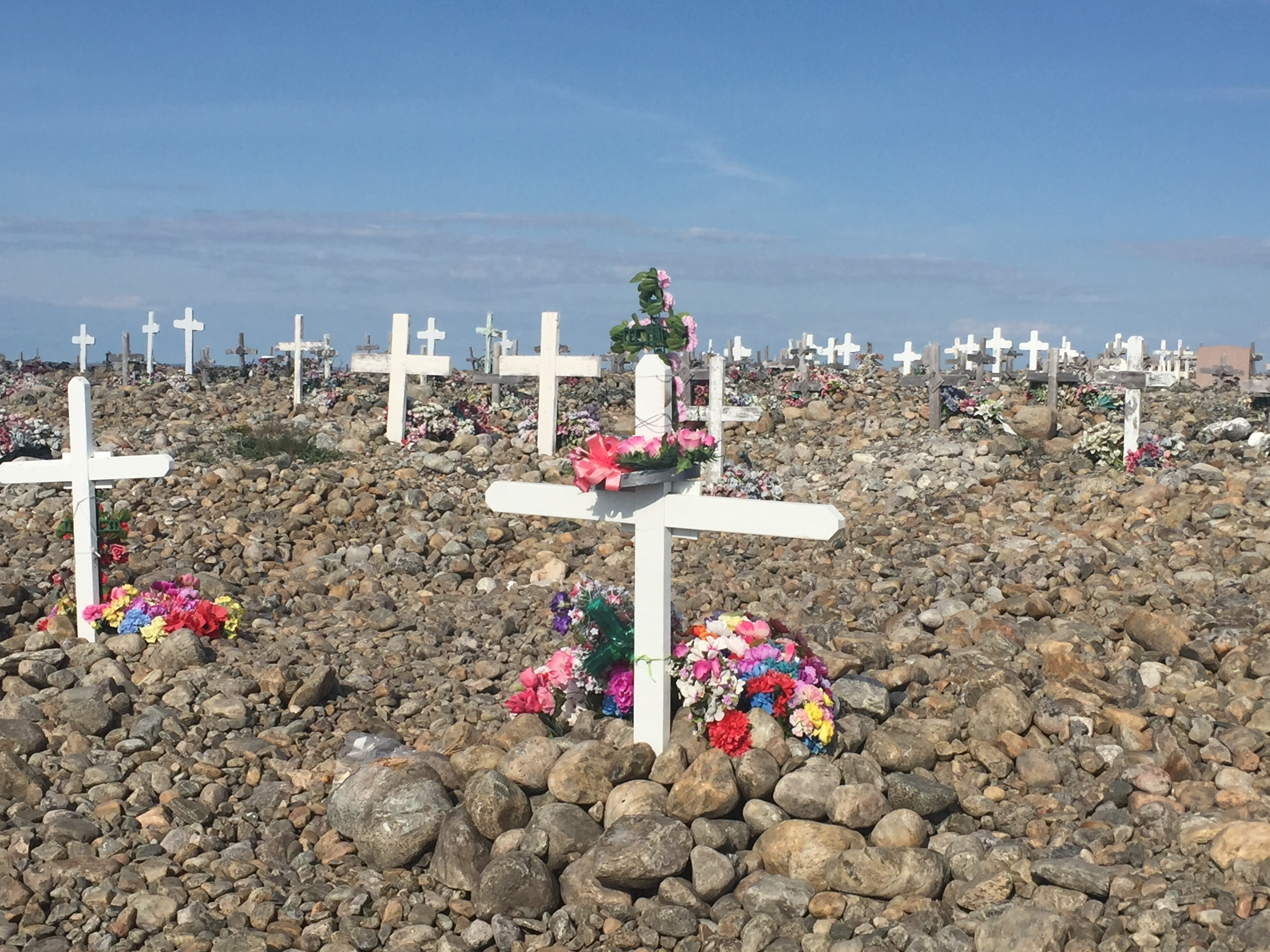
Cemetery of Puvirnituq
