= Kiggaluk =

Kiggaluk was a former Inuit reserved land, with geographic code 99875, adjacent to the southeast corner of the Cree village of Chisasibi, within the Baie-James municipality (south of the 55th parallel and outside the territory of the Kativik Regional Government).

It was mentioned as being part of the Ungava electoral district in the 2001 electoral map (but not in the 2011 electoral map) and as being part of the Abitibi judicial district. It is shown in some possibly outdated maps.

However, it is not listed in the Répertoire des municipalités of the Ministère des Affaires municipales, des Régions et de l'Occupation du territoire, nor was it listed in the Canada 2011 Census or the previous two censuses in 2006 and 2001.

The Commission de toponymie du Québec has no reference for the place name of "Kiggaluk" (or "Kigaluk").

There is a "Kigaluk [sic] Landholding Corporation of Chisasibi (Inuit)" among the landholding corporations for the various Inuit communities.
