= Umiujaq =

Umiujaq ᐅᒥᐅᔭᖅ
- Northern village municipality
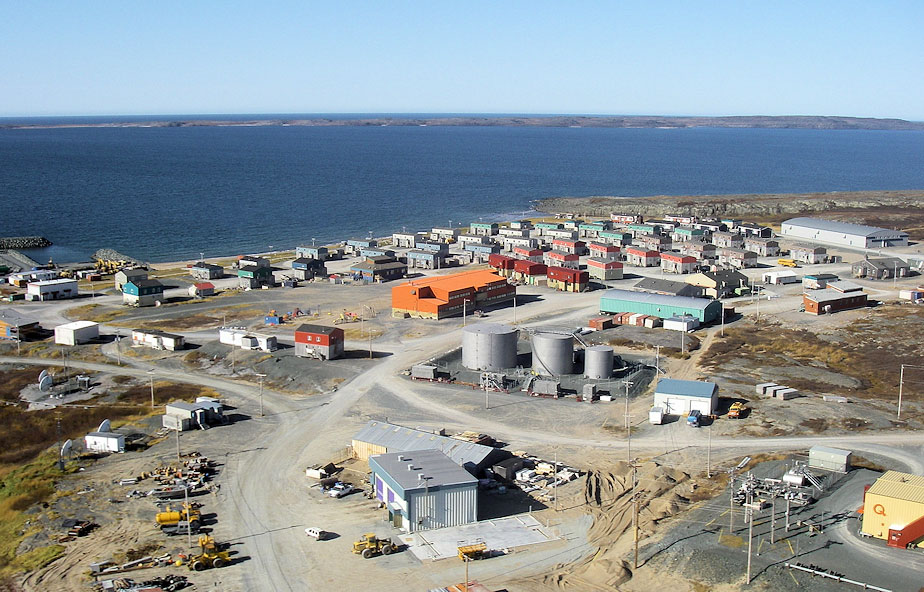

- Location within Quebec
- Coordinates: 56°32′N 76°33′W
- Country: Canada
- Province: Quebec
- Region: Nord-du-Québec
- TE: Kativik
- Constituted: December 20, 1986

Government
  - Mayor: Jobie Crow
  - Federal riding: Abitibi—Baie-James—Nunavik—Eeyou
  - Prov. riding: Ungava

Area
  - Total: 28.59 km^{2} (11.04 sq mi)
  - Land: 28.38 km^{2} (10.96 sq mi)

Population (2021)
  - Total: 541
  - Density: 19.1/km^{2} (49/sq mi)
  - Change (2016–21): ▲22.4%
  - Dwellings: 178
- Time zone: UTC−5 (EST)
  - Summer (DST): UTC−4 (EDT)
- Postal code(s): J0M 1Y0
- Area code: 819
- Website: www.nvumiujaq.ca

Umiujaq (Inuktitut: ᐅᒥᐅᔭᖅ) is a northern village (Inuit community) near the eastern shore of Hudson Bay in Nunavik in northern Quebec, Canada. The village was established in 1986 by Inuit from Kuujjuarapik, 160 km to the south, who decided to relocate away from the area affected by the James Bay Hydro-electric Project. The population in the Canada 2021 Census was 541.

Umiujaq is the closest community to Tursujuq National Park, which was officially opened on July 18, 2013, and covers 26,106.7 km^{2} (10,079.9 sq mi). The park headquarters is located in the village, from which the park is accessible by an unpaved road.

Umiujaq, meaning "which resembles a boat" in the Inuttitut language, is located at the foot of a hill resembling an overturned umiaq, a traditional Inuit walrus-skin boat. The village is located 15 km (9.3 mi) west of Richmond Gulf (French: Lac Guillaume-Delisle; Inuttitut: Tasiujaq (which resembles a lake)), an immense inland bay which is joined with Hudson Bay by a rocky gulch.

Inaccessible by road, Umiujaq is served by the small Umiujaq Airport.

As other villages in the Kativik region, the police services in Umiujaq are provided by the Kativik Regional Police Force.

== History ==
The Inuit negotiated a clause into the 1975 James Bay and Northern Quebec Agreement that provided for the relocation of the Inuit from Kuujjuarapik to a new settlement unaffected by hydro-electric development. Following a referendum, in 1982 the Inuit opted to create a new community where they could preserve their traditional lifestyle in an area where fish and game were not threatened by hydro-electric development. After extensive studies a location was selected, and construction of the new village was completed in 1986.

== Demographics ==
In the 2021 Census of Population conducted by Statistics Canada, Umiujaq had a population of 541 living in 168 of its 178 total private dwellings, a change of 22.4% from its 2016 population of 442. With a land area of 28.38 km^{2} (10.96 sq mi), it had a population density of 19.1/km^{2} (49.4/sq mi) in 2021.

== Education ==
The Kativik School Board operates the Kiluutaq School.
