= Aupaluk =

Aupaluk ᐊᐅᐸᓗᒃ
- Northern village municipality
- Location within Quebec
- Coordinates: 59°18′N 69°36′W
- Country: Canada
- Province: Quebec
- Region: Nord-du-Québec
- TE: Kativik
- Constituted: February 2, 1980

Government
  - Mayor: Johnny Akpahatak
  - Federal riding: Abitibi—Baie-James—Nunavik—Eeyou
  - Prov. riding: Ungava

Area
  - Total: 32.60 km^{2} (12.59 sq mi)
  - Land: 28.68 km^{2} (11.07 sq mi)

Population (2021)
  - Total: 233
  - Density: 8.1/km^{2} (21/sq mi)
  - Change (2016–21): ▲11.5%
  - Dwellings: 77
- Time zone: UTC−5 (EST)
  - Summer (DST): UTC−4 (EDT)
- Postal code(s): J0M 1X0
- Area code: 819
- Website: www.nvaupaluk.ca

Aupaluk (Inuktitut: ᐊᐅᐸᓗᒃ) (2021 Population: 233) is a northern village in Nunavik, in the Nord-du-Québec region of Quebec. It is the least-populous Inuit community in Nunavik.

The name means "where the earth is red", referring to its iron-bearing (ferruginous) soil.

Its population has been increasing: it was 195 in 2011, up from 159 in 2001.

Aupaluk is located on the western shore of Ungava Bay, north of Tasiujaq and 80 km south of Kangirsuk. It is about 150 km northwest of Kuujjuaq.

It is served by nearby Aupaluk Airport.

Since 1996, the Kativik Regional Police Force (KRPF) provides police services for the village.

== Demographics ==
In the 2021 Census of Population conducted by Statistics Canada, Aupaluk had a population of 233 living in 70 of its 77 total private dwellings, a change of 11.5% from its 2016 population of 209. With a land area of 28.68 km^{2} (11.07 sq mi), it had a population density of 8.1/km^{2} (21.0/sq mi) in 2021.

== Education ==
The Kativik School Board operates the Tarsakallak School. Its building was destroyed in a fire on March 15, 2014. The school at the time served a total of 54 students.
