= Killiniq, Quebec =

Killiniq (Inuktitut: ᑭᓪᓕᓂᖅ) was a former Inuit reserved land, with geographic code 99896, on the northern part of the eastern shore of Ungava Bay, about 50 km to the south of Killiniq Island, Nunavut. However, it is still legally considered to be part of the province of Québec.

It was mentioned as being part of the Ungava electoral district in the 2001 electoral map (but not in the 2011 electoral map) and as being part of the Abitibi judicial district. It is shown in some possibly outdated maps.

However, it is not listed in the Répertoire des municipalités of the Ministère des Affaires municipales, des Régions et de l'Occupation du territoire, nor was it listed in the Canada 2011 Census or the previous two censuses in 2006 and 2001. It does not appear on a map of Nunavik at the website of the Kativik Regional Government.

The Commission de toponymie du Québec only references Killiniq, Nunavut for the place name.

There is an "Epigituk Landholding Corporation of Killiniq" among the landholding corporations for the various Inuit communities.
