= Nord-du-Québec =

- Region; also Census division
- Location within Quebec
- Coordinates: 56°10′N 74°25′W
- Country: Canada
- Province: Quebec

Area
  - Land: 747,191.93 km^{2} (288,492.42 sq mi)

Population (2021)
  - Total: 45,740
  - Density: 0.06/km^{2} (0.16/sq mi)
  - Change (2016–2021): ▲2.6%
  - Dwellings: 17,325
- Website: Services Québec: Nord-du-Québec

Nord-du-Québec (French pronunciation: [nɔʁ d͜zy kebɛk]; English: Northern Quebec) is the largest, but the least populous, of the seventeen administrative regions of Quebec, Canada.

Spread over nearly 14 degrees of latitude, north of the 49th parallel, the region covers 860,692 km^{2} (332,315 sq mi) on the Labrador Peninsula, making it larger than Alberta, and slightly smaller than British Columbia or Ontario. It is just over half of the province's total land area.

== History ==
Nord-du-Québec possesses 3,644 archaeological sites known and listed by the Ministère de la Culture et des Communications (MCC), along La Grande Rivière basin, the Otish Mountains sector and in the coastal areas of Quaqtaq, near Ungava Bay. These sites are mostly of First Nations origin and bear witness to several thousands of years of occupation of the territory of the Cree and Inuit ancestors of the region.

Before 1912, the northernmost part of this region was part of the Ungava District of the Northwest Territories, and until 1987 it was referred to as Nouveau-Québec, or New Quebec.

== Geography ==
Nord-du-Québec lies entirely upon the Canadian Shield. It extends from 49°N latitude to beyond 62°N and is 98.4 percent public land. The region is bordered by Hudson Bay and James Bay in the west, Hudson Strait and Ungava Bay in the north, Labrador in the northeast, and the administrative regions of Abitibi-Témiscamingue, Mauricie, Saguenay–Lac-Saint-Jean, and Côte-Nord in the south and southeast.

Nord-du-Québec is part of the territory covered by the James Bay and Northern Quebec Agreement of 1975; other regions covered (in part) by this Agreement include Côte-Nord, Mauricie and Abitibi-Témiscamingue administrative regions.

=== Subdivisions ===
The three territories equivalent to a regional county municipality

Nord-du-Québec is divided for statistical and other purposes into three territories equivalent to a regional county municipality (TEs):

1. Kativik (or Nunavik) north of the 55th parallel, predominantly Inuit
2. Eeyou Istchee non-contiguously enclaved within Jamésie (with one community in Kativik), predominantly Cree
3. Jamésie south of the 55th parallel

When the Grand Council of the Crees speaks of "Eeyou Istchee", they refer to a much larger and contiguous traditional territory and homeland that covers much of Jamésie.

Jamésie, extending from the eastern shore of James Bay to the Otish Mountains of the Laurentian Plateau, is mainly boreal forest. Eeyou Istchee is largely enclaved within Jamésie, although one of its communities is slightly to the north of the 55th parallel and geographically enclaved within Kativik. Kativik has some boreal forest in its southern portion but is mainly tundra which covers the entire Ungava Peninsula.

From the Canada 2011 Census, Eeyou Istchee has a land area of 5,586.25 square kilometres (2,156.86 sq mi) and a population of 16,350; Jamésie has a land area of 298,202.78 square kilometres (115,136.74 sq mi) and a population of 14,139; Kativik has a land area of 443,372.20 square kilometres (171,186.96 sq mi) and a population of 12,090. The most populous community overall is the town of Chibougamau in Jamésie. The most populous community in Eeyou Istchee is Chisasibi, while the most populous community in Kativik is Kuujjuaq.

==== Local government ====
The administrative structure of Nord-du-Québec is divided between three equivalent territories to a regional municipality: Kativik, Eeyou Istchee, and Jamésie. At the local level exists five municipalities: The towns of Chibougamau (the largest town in this region), Chapais, Lebel-sur-Quévillon, and Matagami, and the special municipality of Eeyou Istchee James Bay, which was formerly the local municipality of Baie-James before a 2012 restructure of the government.

Kativik offers regional services to its 14 northern villages and associated Inuit reserved lands as well as the Naskapi village municipality of Kawawachikamach. Eeyou Istchee offers regional services to its 9 Cree village municipalities and their associated Cree reserved lands. The four towns of Jamésie are not covered by a regional government, and supply their own services. The special local municipality of Eeyou Istchee James Bay is governed jointly by the Eeyou Istchee James Bay Regional Government, which consists of 11 representatives from Eeyou Istche and 11 representatives from Jamésie.

== Demographics ==
In the 2021 Census of Population conducted by Statistics Canada, the Nord-du-Québec region had a population of 45,740 living in 14,543 of its 17,325 total private dwellings, a change of +2.6% from its 2016 population of 44,561. With a land area of 707,306.52 km^{2} (273,092.57 sq mi), it had a population density of 0.1/km^{2} (0.2/sq mi) in 2021. If the region were its own province, it would be larger than all other Canadian provinces except for Ontario and British Columbia.

The median age is 29.8, as opposed to 41.6 for all of Canada. It is the youngest region of Québec.

Most residents (58.7%) spoke Indigenous languages as their mother tongue. The Cree-Innu languages were the mother tongue of 31.7%, followed by Inuktitut at 26.9%. From Canada's official languages, French was the mother tongue of 29.9% of residents in 2021, while English was for 6.6%. 3.0% reported both English and a non-official language as their mother tongue, 0.4% reported both English and French as their first language, and 0.3% reported both French and a non-official language as their mother tongue.

As of 2021, Indigenous peoples comprised 68.5% of the population, and visible minorities contributed 1.9%. The largest visible minority groups in Saguenay–Lac-Saint-Jean are Black (0.9%), Arab (0.3%), and Filipino (0.3%).

In 2021, 72.2% of the population identified as Christian. 36.3% were Anglican, 24.1% were Catholic, and 6.2% were Pentecostal. 24.9% said they had no religious affiliation. Traditional North American Indigenous spirituality practitioners were the largest non-Christian religious minority, making up 1.9% of the population.

Counting both single and multiple responses, the most commonly identified ethnocultural ancestries were:

Ethnic origin	2021
Cree	34.0%
Inuit	28.8%
Canadian	12.7%
Québécois	7.6%
French	7.5%
First Nations	6.4%
French Canadian	3.9%
Scottish	2.3%
Irish	1.9%

(Percentages may total more than 100% due to rounding and multiple responses).

Visible minority and Aboriginal population (Canada 2021 Census)
Population group		Population	% of total population
White		13,455	29.6%
Visible minority group	South Asian	35	0.1%
Visible minority group	Chinese	45	0.1%
Visible minority group	Black	395	0.9%
Visible minority group	Filipino	125	0.3%
Visible minority group	Arab	155	0.3%
Visible minority group	Latin American	40	0.1%
Visible minority group	Southeast Asian	20	0%
Visible minority group	West Asian	15	0%
Visible minority group	Korean	0	0%
Visible minority group	Japanese	10	0%
Visible minority group	Visible minority, n.i.e.	10	0%
Visible minority group	Multiple visible minority	15	0.1%
Total visible minority population		855	1.9%
Aboriginal group	First Nations	17,520	38.5%
Aboriginal group	Métis	425	0.9%
Aboriginal group	Inuit	12,660	27.8%
Aboriginal group	Aboriginal, n.i.e.	370	0.8%
Aboriginal group	Multiple Aboriginal identity	200	0.4%
Total Aboriginal population		31,170	68.5%
Total population		45,480	100%

== Transportation and access ==
There is a limited network of roads in the Jamésie region which reaches most of the few, small communities. Most were constructed as part of the James Bay Project. The "main road" of the region is the 620 kilometres (390 mi) long James Bay Road, a paved (albeit remote) extension of Route 109 from Matagami to Radisson. The 407 kilometres (253 mi) long gravel Route du Nord connects the James Bay Road to Route 167 near Chibougamau. The 666 kilometres (414 mi) gravel Trans-Taiga Road branches off the James Bay Road to Caniapiscau, the northernmost connecting road in eastern North America.

The few provincial routes are concentrated in the far south of the region, including Route 109 to Matagami, Route 113, which ends near Chibougamau, and Route 167 to Mistissini.

There are no roads to Nunavik from the south. There are isolated roads in and around villages, as well as an isolated road running from Raglan Mine to Deception Bay, connecting to Salluit. Access is limited to air travel, sea travel to coastal areas, or hiking great distances. All villages have their own airport, with the Kuujjuaq Airport functioning as a regional hub.

== Geographic hierarchy of census division ==
Census Code	E/J/K?	Name	Type	Population 2011	Population 2006	Total dwellings	Dwellings usual res.	Land Area
2499883	K	Akulivik	TI	0	0	0	0	445.73
2499125	K	Akulivik	VN	615	507	148	137	76.87
2499891	K	Aupaluk	TI	0	0	0	0	544.03
2499105	K	Aupaluk	VN	195	174	59	56	30.12
2499904	K	Baie-d'Hudson	NO	0	16	0	0	129712.09
2499020	J	Chapais	V	1 610	1 630	728	674	63.64
2499025	J	Chibougamau	V	7 541	7 563	3 474	3 222	699.31
2499055	E	Chisasibi	VC	0	0	0	0	491.63
2499814	E	Chisasibi	TC	4 484	3 972	1 050	923	828.18
2499045	E	Eastmain	VC	0	0	0	0	316.91
2499810	E	Eastmain	TC	767	650	226	188	147.47
2499879	K	Inukjuak	TI	0	0	0	0	428.39
2499085	K	Inukjuak	VN	1 597	1 597	444	413	55.63
2499140	K	Ivujivik	VN	370	349	91	86	35.21
2499894	K	Kangiqsualujjuaq	TI	0	0	0	0	538.42
2499090	K	Kangiqsualujjuaq	VN	874	735	191	185	35.05
2499888	K	Kangiqsujuaq	TI	0	0	0	0	572.62
2499130	K	Kangiqsujuaq	VN	696	605	174	170	12.56
2499890	K	Kangirsuk	TI	0	0	0	0	529.40
2499110	K	Kangirsuk	VN	549	466	163	160	57.26
2499065	K	Kawawachikamach	VK	0	0	0	0	242.09
2499893	K	Kuujjuaq	TI	0	0	0	0	320.80
2499095	K	Kuujjuaq	VN	2 375	2 132	925	799	292.72
2499877	K	Kuujjuarapik	TI	0	0	0	0	293.66
2499075	K	Kuujjuarapik	VN	657	568	204	189	8.16
2499005	J	Lebel-sur-Quévillon	V	2 159	2 729	1 111	917	40.14
2499015	J	Matagami	V	1 526	1 555	719	625	66.85
2499030	E	Mistissini	VC	0	0	0	0	514.30
2499804	E	Mistissini	TC	3 427	2 897	952	845	865.76
2499040	E	Nemaska	VC	0	0	0	0	51.18
2499808	E	Nemaska	TC	712	642	226	200	96.57
2499818	E	Oujé-Bougoumou	TC	725	606	251	183	2.54
2499120	K	Puvirnituq	VN	1 692	1 457	489	389	85.74
2499889	K	Quaqtaq	TI	0	0	0	0	523.83
2499115	K	Quaqtaq	VN	376	315	91	89	26.54
2499902	K	Rivière-Koksoak	NO	0	15	0	0	307039.90
2499887	K	Salluit	TI	0	0	0	0	596.84
2499135	K	Salluit	VN	1 347	1 241	315	299	14.39
2499892	K	Tasiujaq	TI	0	0	0	0	502.11
2499100	K	Tasiujaq	VN	303	248	72	72	66.54
2499878	K	Umiujaq	TI	0	0	0	0	257.78
2499080	K	Umiujaq	VN	444	390	104	94	27.72
2499035	E	Waskaganish	VC	0	0	0	0	277.76
2499806	E	Waskaganish	TC	2 206	1 864	496	467	505.37
2499010	E	Waswanipi	VC	0	0	0	0	211.52
2499802	E	Waswanipi	TC	1 777	1 473	513	413	415.64
2499050	E	Wemindji	VC	0	0	0	0	171.06
2499812	E	Wemindji	TC	1 378	1 215	377	333	377.95
2499070	E	Whapmagoostui	VC	0	0	0	0	122.53
2499816	E	Whapmagoostui	TC	874	812	221	206	189.88
		Nord-du-Québec	CD	42579	39 817	14 515	12 925	747161.22
	E	Eeyou Istchee	TE	16 350	14 131	4 312	3 758	5586.25
	J	Jamésie	TE	14 139	14 871	6 733	6 029	298202.78
	K	Kativik	TE	12 090	10 815	3 470	3 138	443372.20

In the rightmost column, the total area adds up to 747161.23 rather than the correct 747161.22 due to rounding error.

== Administrative divisions ==
=== Regional governments ===
- Kativik Territory (Kativik Regional Government)
- Eeyou Istchee James Bay

=== Independent cities ===
- Chapais
- Chibougamau
- Lebel-sur-Quévillon
- Matagami

=== Cree villages ===
- Chisasibi
- Eastmain
- Mistissini
- Nemaska
- Oujé-Bougoumou
- Waskaganish
- Waswanipi
- Wemindji
- Whapmagoostui

=== Native Reserve ===
- Lac-John

== Major communities ==
- Chibougamau
- Chisasibi
- Eeyou Istchee James Bay
- Kuujjuaq
- Mistissini
- Puvirnituq
- Waskaganish

== See also ==
- Northern Canada
