= Nunavik =

Proposed autonomous area in Quebec, Canada

Nunavik ᓄᓇᕕᒃ (Inuktitut)
- Proposed autonomous area
- Nunavik's location in Quebec, Canada

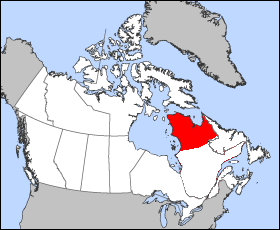
- Coordinates: 58°26′N 71°29′W
- Country: Canada
- Province: Quebec
- Region: Nord-du-Québec
- Administrative capital: Kuujjuaq

Government
  - MNA: Denis Lamothe (CAQ) (since 2018)
  - MP: Mandy Gull-Masty (Liberal) (since 2025)

Population (2021)
  - Total: 14,045
  - Density: 0.03/km^{2} (0.078/sq mi)
- Demonym: Nunavimmiut

Ethnicity
  - Inuit: 88.7% (2006)

Language
  - Inuktitut: 75% (2006), 90% (2016)
- Time zone: UTC−05:00 (EST)
  - Summer (DST): UTC−04:00 (EDT)
- Federal riding: Abitibi—Baie-James—Nunavik—Eeyou
- Provincial riding: Ungava (electoral district)

Nunavik (/ˈnuːnəvɪk/; French: [nynavik]; Inuktitut: ᓄᓇᕕᒃ) is an area in Canada which comprises the northern third of the province of Quebec, part of the Nord-du-Québec region and nearly coterminous with Kativik. Covering a land area of 443,684.71 km^{2} (171,307.62 sq mi) north of the 55th parallel, it is the homeland of the Inuit of Quebec and part of the wider Inuit Nunangat. Almost all of the 14,045 inhabitants (2021 census) of the region, of whom 90% are Inuit, live in fourteen northern villages on the coast of Nunavik and in the Cree reserved land (TC) of Whapmagoostui, near the northern village of Kuujjuarapik.

Nunavik means "great land" in the local dialect of Inuktitut and the Inuit inhabitants of the region call themselves Nunavimmiut. Until 1912, the region was part of the District of Ungava of the Northwest Territories.

Negotiations for regional autonomy and resolution of outstanding land claims took place in the 2000s. The seat of government would be Kuujjuaq. Negotiations on better empowering Inuit political rights in their land are still ongoing.

== History ==
Concern about Canada's claims to sovereignty in the high Arctic resulted in the high Arctic relocation, where the federal government of Canada forced several Inuit families to leave Nunavik in the 1950s. They were transported much further north, to barren hamlets at Grise Fiord and Resolute in what is now Nunavut in an effort to demonstrate Canada's legal occupation of these territories and thereby assert sovereignty in the high Arctic by increasing its population during the Cold War. Eight Inuit families from Inukjuak (on the Ungava Peninsula) were relocated after being promised homes and game to hunt, but the relocated people discovered no buildings and very little familiar wildlife. They were told that they would be returned home to Nunavik after a year if they wished, but this offer was later withdrawn as it would damage Canada's claims to sovereignty in the High Arctic area and the Inuit were forced to stay. Eventually, the Inuit learned the local beluga whale migration routes and were able to survive in the area, hunting over a range of 18,000 km^{2} (6,900 sq mi) each year.

In 1993, the Canadian government held hearings to investigate the relocation program. The Royal Commission on Aboriginal Peoples issued a report the following year entitled The High Arctic Relocation: A Report on the 1953–55 Relocation. The government paid $10 million CAD to the survivors and their families, and finally apologized in 2010. The whole story is told in Melanie McGrath's The Long Exile: A Tale of Inuit Betrayal and Survival in the High Arctic.

Nunavik and other parts of northern Quebec were part of Northwest Territories from 1870 to 1912. In 1912, the area was transferred to Quebec; however, the province did little in the area until after the Quiet Revolution in the 1960s. In the 1960s, René Lévesque played a major role in expansion of hydroelectric power in the province. The region was named "Nouveau-Québec", many place names were francized, and the teaching of French was spread in schools in the region. This cultural encroachment paired with the James Bay Project resulted in the first political organizing of Inuit in Canada in the Northern Quebec Inuit Association which fought for the eventual James Bay and Northern Quebec Agreement. This agreement laid the initial legal groundwork for the creation of Nunavik within Quebec.

== Geography ==
Nunavik is a vast territory located in the northernmost part of Quebec. It lies in both the Arctic and subarctic climate zones. Altogether, about 14,000 people live in Nunavik's communities, and this number has been growing in line with the tendency for high population growth in indigenous communities.

Nunavik is separated from the territory of Nunavut by Hudson Bay to the west and Hudson Strait and Ungava Bay to the north. Nunavik shares a border with the Côte-Nord region of Quebec and the Labrador region of the province of Newfoundland and Labrador. The Ungava Peninsula forms the northern two-thirds of the region. There are no road links between Nunavik and southern Quebec, although the Trans-Taiga Road of the Jamésie region ends near the 55th parallel on the Caniapiscau Reservoir, several hundred kilometres south of Kuujjuaq. There is a year-round air link to all villages and seasonal shipping in the summer and autumn. Parts of the interior of southern Nunavik can be reached using several trails which head north from Schefferville.

Nunavik has fourteen villages, the vast majority of whose residents are Inuit. The principal village and administrative centre in Nunavik is Kuujjuaq, on the southern shore of Ungava Bay; the other villages are Inukjuak (where the film Nanook of the North was shot), Salluit, Puvirnituq, Ivujivik, Kangiqsujuaq, Kangiqsualujjuaq, Kangirsuk, Tasiujaq, Aupaluk, Akulivik, Quaqtaq, Kuujjuarapik and Umiujaq. The village population (census 2011) ranges from 2,375 (Kuujjuaq) to 195 (Aupaluk).

There are five meteorite craters in Nunavik: Pingualuit crater, Lac Couture crater, La Moinerie crater and the two craters that together form the Clearwater Lakes.

== Climate ==
Nunavik is dominated by tundra, which is characterized by its limited vegetation and low temperatures. Nunavik's climate features long and cold winters as the seas to the west, east and north freeze over, eliminating maritime moderation. Since this moderation exists in summer when the surrounding sea thaws, even those temperatures are subdued. Inukjuak for example has summer highs averaging just 13 °C (55 °F) with January highs of −21 °C (−6 °F). This is exceptionally cold for a sea-level settlement more than 1/3 of the way from the North Pole to the Equator. Annual temperatures are up to 15 °C (27 °F) colder than marine areas of Northern Europe on similar parallels. Areas less affected by summertime marine moderation have somewhat warmer temperatures and unlike the west coast, feature marginal taiga due to summers being warmer than 10 °C (50 °F) in mean temperatures.

=== Climate change and environment ===
Climate change studies in Nunavik have employed community-based research methods, synthesizing traditional ecological knowledge (TEK) and quantitative data, and provide new insights into observable changes occurring in the Arctic. Indigenous communities have reported shorter, warmer winters in recent years, and have observed resulting changes in various environmental factors – including vegetation growth, precipitation, sea ice and permafrost, water levels and quality, as well as the presence of lead in the environment.

Vegetation growth is limited in Nunavik, mostly consisting of shrubs, grasses, and mosses. Although tree growth in the tundra is scarce, some tree species such as the Arctic Willow and Balsam Poplar are found in this region. Nunavik is also home to a variety of berry plants, including Cloudberry, Blueberry, Blackberry (Crowberry), and Cranberry (Redberry). Tree and shrub growth has been observed to be increasing in Nunavik in past years due to warming temperatures.

Furthermore, sea ice is thinning and decreasing in longevity through the winters. This creates more risky areas for transportation over the ice. There have also been lowering fresh water levels reported due to decreasing annual precipitation in the Arctic.

These changes are presenting potential threats to the health of communities and people that use water from natural sources. Lowering water quality in Nunavik can be associated with Gastrointestinal diseases, for example Giardia. Cases of Gastrointestinal diseases associated with natural sources were reported to increase in March when the sea ice begins breaking up, as well as in fall during the Caribou migration period.

Environmental levels of lead have also been changing in the Arctic with climatic shifts, presenting concerns for lead poisoning in northern communities. In Nunavik, Lead concentrations in maternal blood were the highest in Canada (50 μg/L). Increasing levels of lead in the environment are also associated with the use of the lead shot in hunting, which was banned in 1999 (although lead shots continue to be shipped to northern communities).

== Demographics ==
=== Villages by population ===
Name	Status	Nunavik Population				
Name	Status	Population (2021)	Population (2016)	Change	Land area (km^{2})	Population density
Akulivik	VN	642	633	+1.4%	75.02	8.6/km^{2}
Aupaluk	VN	233	209	+11.5%	28.68	8.1/km^{2}
Inukjuak	VN	1,821	1,757	+3.6%	54.92	33.2/km^{2}
Ivujivik (Note: Québec's northernmost settlement)	VN	412	414	−0.5%	35.21	11.7/km^{2}
Kangiqsualujjuaq	VN	956	942	+1.5%	34.33	27.8/km^{2}
Kangiqsujuaq	VN	837	750	+11.6%	12.41	67.4/km^{2}
Kangirsuk	VN	561	567	−1.1%	57.15	9.8/km^{2}
Kuujjuaq	Administrative capital VN	2,668	2,754	−3.1%	289.97	9.2/km^{2}
Kuujjuarapik; Whapmagoostui (Note: A bicultural community of Inuit and Cree, population not included here)	VN	792	654	+21.1%	7.45	106.3/km^{2}
Puvirnituq	VN	2,129	1,779	+19.7%	81.61	26.1/km^{2}
Quaqtaq	VN	453	403	+12.4%	25.82	17.5/km^{2}
Salluit	VN	1,580	1,483	+6.5%	15.08	104.8/km^{2}
Tasiujaq	VN	420	369	+13.8%	65.53	6.4/km^{2}
Umiujaq	VN	541	442	+22.4%	28.38	19.1/km^{2}
Total Villages	—	14,045	13,156	+6.8%	443,684.71	0.03/km^{2}
Nord du Québec	—	45,740	44,561	+2.6%	707,306.52	0.06/km^{2}

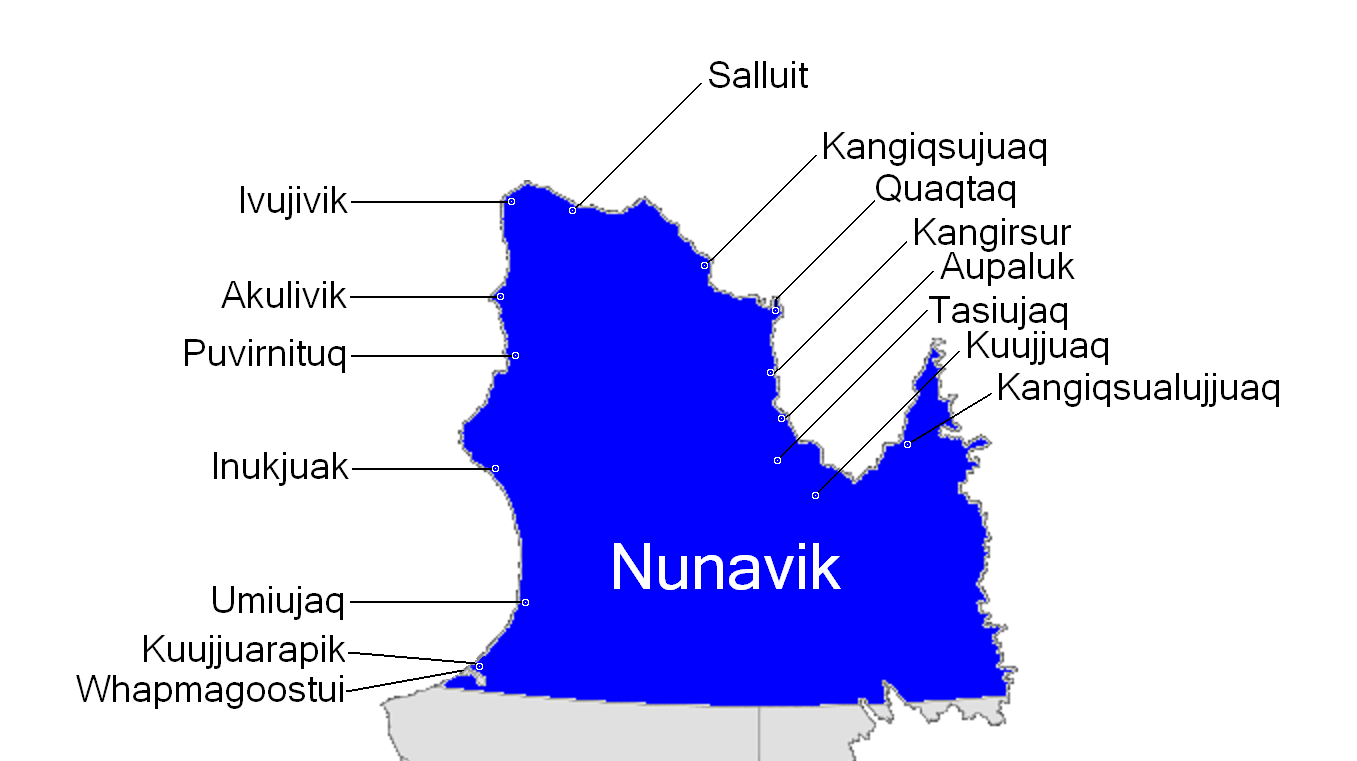
Villages in Nunavik

=== Ethnicity ===
The villages of Nunavik are populated predominately by Inuit. In 2019, a scientific study by researchers from the Montreal Neurological Institute and Hospital of the McGill University found that the Nunavik Inuit are genetically distinct from any other known population. They possess distinct genetic signatures in pathways linked to lipid metabolism, allowing them to adjust to higher-fat diets and the extreme temperature of the Canadian Arctic. Geographically isolated populations often develop unique genetic traits that result from their successful adaptation to specific environments. Their closest relatives are the Paleo-Eskimos, a people that inhabited the Arctic before the Inuit.

Villages/ regions	Total population	Inuit	Non- aboriginal	(%) Inuit	(%) Non- aboriginal
Akulivik	507	500	7	98.6	1.4
Aupaluk	174	n.a.²	n.a.	n.a.	n.a.
Inukjuak	1,597	1,340	85	83.9	5.3
Ivujivik	349	340	0	97.4	0.0
Kangiqsualujjuaq	735	705	30	95.9	4.1
Kangirsujuaq	605	560	50	92.6	8.3
Kangirsuk	466	425	45	91.2	9.7
Kuujjuaq	2,132	1,635	460	76.7	21.6
Kuujjuarapik	568	465	55	81.9	9.7
Puvirnituq	1,457	1,385	40	95.1	2.7
Quaqtaq	315	300	10	95.2	3.2
Salluit	1,241	1,150	85	92.7	6.8
Tasiujaq	248	n.a.	n.a.	n.a.	n.a.
Umiujaq	390	375	10	96.2	2.6
Nunavik	10,784	9,565	920	88.7	8.5
Nord-du-Québec	39,550	9,625	16,020	24.3	40.5
Québec	7,435,905	10,950	7,327,475	0.1	98.5

=== Language ===
The following table does not include Canada's official languages of French and English.

Mother tongue, 2011 NHS Survey
Rank	Language	Population
1.	Inuktitut	10,870
2.	Spanish	80
3.	Cree languages	70
4.	Other Aboriginal language	35
5.	Other non-Aboriginal language	15
6.	Arabic	10
6.	Creoles	10
6.	German	10
6.	Portuguese	10
6.	Niger-Congo languages	10

== Economy ==
Nunavik is rich in mineral deposits. Raglan Mine (nickel), situated near Salluit, is one of the largest mines in the region. It is linked by all-weather roads to an airstrip at Kattiniq/Donaldson Airport and to the concentrate, storage and ship-loading facilities at Deception Bay. Production began at the mine in 1997. The current mine life is estimated at more than 30 years.

Because the site is situated in the subarctic permafrost region, it requires special construction and mining techniques to protect the fragile permafrost and to address other environmental issues. The average annual temperature is −10 °C (14 °F) with an average ambient temperature underground of −15 °C (5 °F). There are plans to increase production at a new mine in Raglan South.

== Arts and culture ==
Nunavik has a vibrant art scene, with strong connections to Inuit culture and the natural environment. Much like their Nunavummiut neighbours to the North, the Nunavimmiut carve sculptures from soapstone and eat primarily caribou and fish. Outdoor activities are abundant in this region.

== Government ==
Nunavik, along with the Quebec portion of the James Bay region (or Jamésie in French), is part of the administrative region of Nord-du-Québec. The James Bay and Northern Quebec Agreement of 1978 led to greater political autonomy for most of the Nunavik region with the founding of the Kativik Regional Government. All inhabitants of the 14 northern villages, both Inuit and non-Inuit, vote in regional elections. Agreements with the Québec Government provide 72 per cent of KRG’s funding. The federal government contributes 18 per cent, and the remaining 10 per cent comes from other revenue sources. The Agreement also led to the creation of the Kativik Regional Police Force (KRPF), which has been providing police services in the Kativik region since 1996. The KRPF was renamed as the Nunavik Police Service (NPS) in mid-2021.

The Makivik Corporation, headquartered in Kuujjuaq, represents the Inuit of Northern Quebec in their relations with the governments of Quebec and Canada. They are seeking greater political autonomy for the region and have recently negotiated an agreement defining their traditional rights to use the resources of the offshore islands of Nunavik, all of which are part of Nunavut.

The Cree village of Whapmagoostui, which forms an enclave on the eastern shore of Hudson Bay near the northern village of Kuujjuarapik, is part of the Cree Regional Authority, which itself has been incorporated into the Grand Council of the Crees (Eeyou Istchee). The Naskapi Nation of Kawawachikamach, of the Côte-Nord region to the south of Nunavik, owns an exclusive hunting and trapping area in southern Nunavik and is represented in the Kativik Regional Government.

=== Proposed Regional Government of Nunavik ===
The governments of Quebec, Canada, and Nunavik had negotiated a proposal to establish a Regional Government of Nunavik. This is in part a recognition of the region's political distinctiveness, having a different language, culture, climate and voting pattern from the rest of the province of Quebec, as well as part of the overall trend towards devolution of Canada's arctic territories. While Quebec and Canada would still maintain full jurisdiction over the area, the Nunavik government will have an elected parliamentary-style council and cabinet, and a public service funded by the province and responsible for delivering certain social services such as education and health. The regional government would have also had rights to the region's natural resources, including royalties from the various mines in the region. This proposal was rejected by about 66% of voters in a referendum in 2011. It is expected that negotiations will continue in the future to work to establish a more autonomous government for Nunavik in the future.

The government will be based on territory, not ethnicity so that all people residing in Nunavik can be full participants. Existing government structures, such as the Kativik Regional Government, Kativik School Board, and Nunavik Regional Board of Health and Social Services, will be folded into the new regional government.

The Quebec government has also expressed a desire to add an additional seat to the National Assembly to represent Nunavik, despite the region's small population. Currently, Nunavik is part of the riding of Ungava, its residents making up just under half of the riding's population. As a riding, Nunavik would be the second least populous in Quebec, slightly more populous than Îles-de-la-Madeleine, which is able to exist as a separate riding under an exception to the laws on population distribution by riding.

== Symbols ==
Proposed Nunavik flag

A flag for Nunavik was proposed by Nunavik artist and graphic designer Thomassie Mangiok during an April 2013 Plan Nunavik consultation in Ivujivik.

== Education ==
Kativik Ilisarniliriniq (KI), a school district, covers Nunavik. As of 2025 no post-secondary education institution is in Nunavik. At that time the school board and John Abbott College jointly established some post-secondary courses. As of 1985, students from Nunavik formed groups in Montreal by concentrating around certain apartments.

== See also ==
- Taqramiut Nipingat
- Tursujuq National Park
- List of proposed provinces and territories of Canada
- Nunatsiavut
