= Kativik, Quebec =

Territory of Quebec

Coordinates: 57°N 70°W

Location of Nord-du-Québec, including Kativik

Kativik (ᑲᑎᕕᒃ) is a territory equivalent to a regional county municipality (TE) of Quebec, with geographical code 992. Its land area is 443,372.20 km^{2} (171,186.96 sq mi), and its population was 12,090 at the 2011 Census of Canada.

Together with the TEs of Jamésie and Eeyou Istchee, it forms the administrative region and census division (CD) of Nord-du-Québec.

The TE of Kativik is coextensive with the territory of the Kativik Regional Government. It comprises all of Nunavik except the Cree reserved land (TC) of Whapmagoostui and the Cree village municipality (VC) also called Whapmagoostui, which belong to Eeyou Istchee TE.

== Subdivisions ==
The TE of Kativik consists of the following municipal units:

- the unorganized territories (NO) of:

- Baie-d'Hudson
- Rivière-Koksoak

- the Naskapi village (VK) of:

- Kawawachikamach (but not the Naskapi reserved land (TK) of the same name, Kawawachikamach, which lies detached, to its south, near Schefferville in the Caniapiscau Regional County Municipality of the Côte-Nord region)

- the northern villages (VN) of:

- Akulivik
- Aupaluk
- Inukjuak
- Ivujivik
- Kangiqsualujjuaq
- Kangiqsujuaq
- Kangirsuk
- Kuujjuaq
- Kuujjuarapik
- Puvirnituq
- Quaqtaq
- Salluit
- Tasiujaq
- Umiujaq

- the Inuit reserved lands (TI) of the same names (except for Ivujivik and Puvirnituq):

- Akulivik
- Aupaluk
- Inukjuak
- Kangiqsualujjuaq
- Kangiqsujuaq
- Kangirsuk
- Kuujjuaq
- Kuujjuarapik
- Quaqtaq
- Salluit
- Tasiujaq
- Umiujaq
