= Equivalent territory =

Territorial unit used by Statistics Canada

An equivalent territory (French: territoire équivalent, pronounced [tɛʁitwaʁ ekivalɑ̃]), formally known as territory equivalent to a regional county municipality (French: territoires équivalents à une MRC), is a territorial unit used by Statistics Canada and the Institut de la statistique du Québec.

Quebec is divided into 87 regional county municipalities (RCMs), equivalent to counties in other jurisdictions. However, the RCMs do not cover the entire territory of the province, since major cities are outside any RCM (French: hors MRC). To ensure complete territorial coverage for certain purposes, such as the census, the equivalent territories are defined.

Most equivalent territories correspond to certain urban agglomerations; the others are Jamésie, Eeyou Istchee, and Kativik, which comprise the Nord-du-Québec region.

== Equivalent territories by region ==
Administrative region		TE and ISQ geographic code	
02	Saguenay– Lac-Saint-Jean	Saguenay	941
03	Capitale-Nationale	Québec	23
04	Mauricie	Shawinigan	36
04	Mauricie	Trois-Rivières	371
04	Mauricie	La Tuque	90
05	Estrie	Sherbrooke	43
06	Montréal	Montréal	66
07	Outaouais	Gatineau	81
08	Abitibi-Témiscamingue	Rouyn-Noranda	86
10	Nord-du-Québec	Jamésie	991
10	Nord-du-Québec	Kativik	992
10	Nord-du-Québec	Eeyou Istchee	993
11	Gaspésie– Îles-de-la-Madeleine	Les Îles-de-la-Madeleine	01
12	Chaudière-Appalaches	Lévis	251
13	Laval	Laval	65
15	Laurentides	Mirabel	74
16	Montérégie	Longueuil	58

== See also ==
- List of regional county municipalities and equivalent territories in Quebec
