= GhGk-63 =

Archaeological site in northern Quebec

GhGK-63
- Location within Quebec Location within Canada
- 55°17′17″N 77°44′51″W
- Cultures: Dorset culture
- Location: Kuujjuarapik, Quebec, Canada

History
- Built: c. 50 BCE
- Abandoned: c. 240 CE

Site notes
- Discovered: 1986

GhGk-63 is a Dorset culture archaeological site in Northern Quebec, Canada, about 1 km (0.6 mi) north of the villages of Kuujjuarapik and Whapmagoostui and the mouth of the Great Whale River. It was discovered in 1986, prior to the construction of a landfill. Human habitation has been dated as early as c. 50 BCE – c. 50 CE.

== Site ==
GhGk-63 is a Dorset culture archaeological site near the villages of Kuujjuarapik and Whapmagoostui at the mouth of the Great Whale River of Nunavik, Quebec. The site is about 940 m (3,080 ft) north of Kuujjuarapik and 800 m (2,600 ft) east of the shoreline of the Hudson Bay. It lies adjacent to a boulder field on the southeastern slope of a bedrock hill, with elevation varying between 26–32 m (85–105 ft) above sea level. The site is bounded to its north and east by rocky outcrops, a sandy coastal terrace to the south and west. A gravel pit encroaches on the site to the southeast; as of 1991, about a fifth of the site has been disturbed by gravel excavation for local construction. The site covers around 4,000 m^{2} (43,000 sq ft). The site is covered with various lichens, with various grasses, shrubs, and thick mosses such as sphagnum along the gravel pit and the southeastern slope of the terrace. A dense expanse of black spruce, alder, and willows lines the site to the south and west. Stratigraphies taken at the site reveal a gravel horizon beneath layers of brown sandy humus and sod, each about 12 cm (4.7 in) thick.

The site was first occupied between c. 50 BCE – c. 50 CE, and periodically occupied until c. 240 CE. The beginning of occupation at the site dates to the reemergence of attested human settlement on the eastern coast of the Hudson Bay, without firm archaeological evidence of sites for the latter half of the 1st millennium BCE.

=== Structures ===
The remains of three semisubterranean dwellings and seven tent rings have been found at the site. The semisubterranean dwellings range are roughly rectangular, about 2.75 m (9.0 ft) long and 2.25 m (7.4 ft) wide. The tent rings are a mix of circles and ovals, with one rectangle. The smallest is a circle 2.4 m (7.9 ft) in diameter, while the largest is an oval measuring 3.0 m × 3.5 m (9.8 ft × 11.5 ft).

=== Artifacts ===
A total of 11,918 lithic specimens have been recovered from the site, alongside 813 bone fragments and 16 charcoal samples.

== Excavation ==
During surveys sponsored by the Kativik Regional Government prior to the construction of a landfill in Kuujjuarapik, a team of four archaeologists discovered the GhGK-63 site in June 1986 along the route of a proposed access road. In August 1990, the Avataq Cultural Institute conducted a salvage excavation at the site in preparation for further gravel excavation the site. Further survey work was done in 1991.
