= Saint Denys River =

Location
- Country: Canada

Physical characteristics
- Source
  - location: Lac Silvy, Nunavik, Quebec
  - elevation: 221 m (725 ft)
- Mouth
  - location: Great Whale River
  - elevation: 82 m (269 ft)
- Length: 80 km (50 mi)

Saint Denys River (French: Rivière Denys) is a river in Nunavik, Quebec, Canada. It originates on Lac Silvy at 54°34′50″N 76°10′50″W. It flows through Lac Marest, Lac Denys and many challenging rapids until it joins Great Whale River at 55°8′50″N 77°22′34″W.

Northern (longer) branch of the river (unnamed on topographic maps) originates much more east, on Lac Dervilliers at 54°41′35″N 74°52′50″W, elevation 328 m (1,076 ft).

Apart from local Inuit and Cree, Saint Denys River was first explored in 1888 by Albert Peter Low.

River is named after 3rd-century Christian martyr, the patron of Paris.

Bonaventure Enterprises Inc. is doing extensive drilling for K9 Uranium on the north shore of Saint Denys River (2008).

== See also ==
Saint Denys River Expedition 2002
