= Nishiyuu =

Nishiyuu, (ᓂᔑᔨᔨᐤ, Nishiyiyiu) which means "human beings", or "modern people" in the Cree language, refers to the 1,600 kilometres (990 mi) journey undertaken by a group of Cree youth of Eeyou Istchee between January and March 2013, in support of the Idle No More movement. It is also known as The Journey of Nishiyuu, and the group who participated as The Nishiyuu Walkers.

On 16 January 2013, six young men from the community of Whapmagoostui, situated at the mouth of the Great Whale River in Northern Quebec, set out on an epic walk to Ottawa. Led by an experienced guide, they walked 1600 km and arrived in Ottawa on 25 March 2013, to be met by a large crowd of supporters, a rally and a huge round dance.

Seventeen-year-old David Kawapit, of Whapmagoostui, initiated the walk in support of Chief Theresa Spence of the Attawapiskat First Nation, who was at the time staging a hunger strike at Victoria Island. Kawapit was joined by fellow Cree youth Stanley George Jr, Johnny Abraham, Raymond Kawapit, Geordie Rupert, Travis George and Jordan Masty. Isaac Kawapit, 49, and an experienced trekker, acted as guide.

The original seven, traveling cross-country on snowshoes, visited the communities of Chisasibi, Wemindji, Eastmain, Waskaganish and Kitigan Zibi, among others. On 15 February 2013 they reached Eastmain, and numbered 42 Walkers. Passing through communities on the journey south, the number swelled to 300 by the time they reached Parliament Hill, Ottawa, on 25 March. Instead of remaining at Parliament to greet the walkers, Canadian Prime Minister Steven Harper made a last-minute decision to travel to the Toronto Zoo to be photographed with two pandas, earning criticism. The Nishiyuu Walkers were met by then Liberal leadership contender Justin Trudeau, Aboriginal affairs minister Bernard Valcourt, Green leader Elizabeth May, NDP leader Thomas Mulcair and NDP MP Charlie Angus, among others.

== See also ==
- Trick or Treaty?, a documentary film by Alanis Obomsawin that includes sequences on the Nishiyuu
