= Kuujjuarapik =

Kuujjuarapik ᑰᔾᔪᐊᕌᐱᒃ
- Northern village municipality
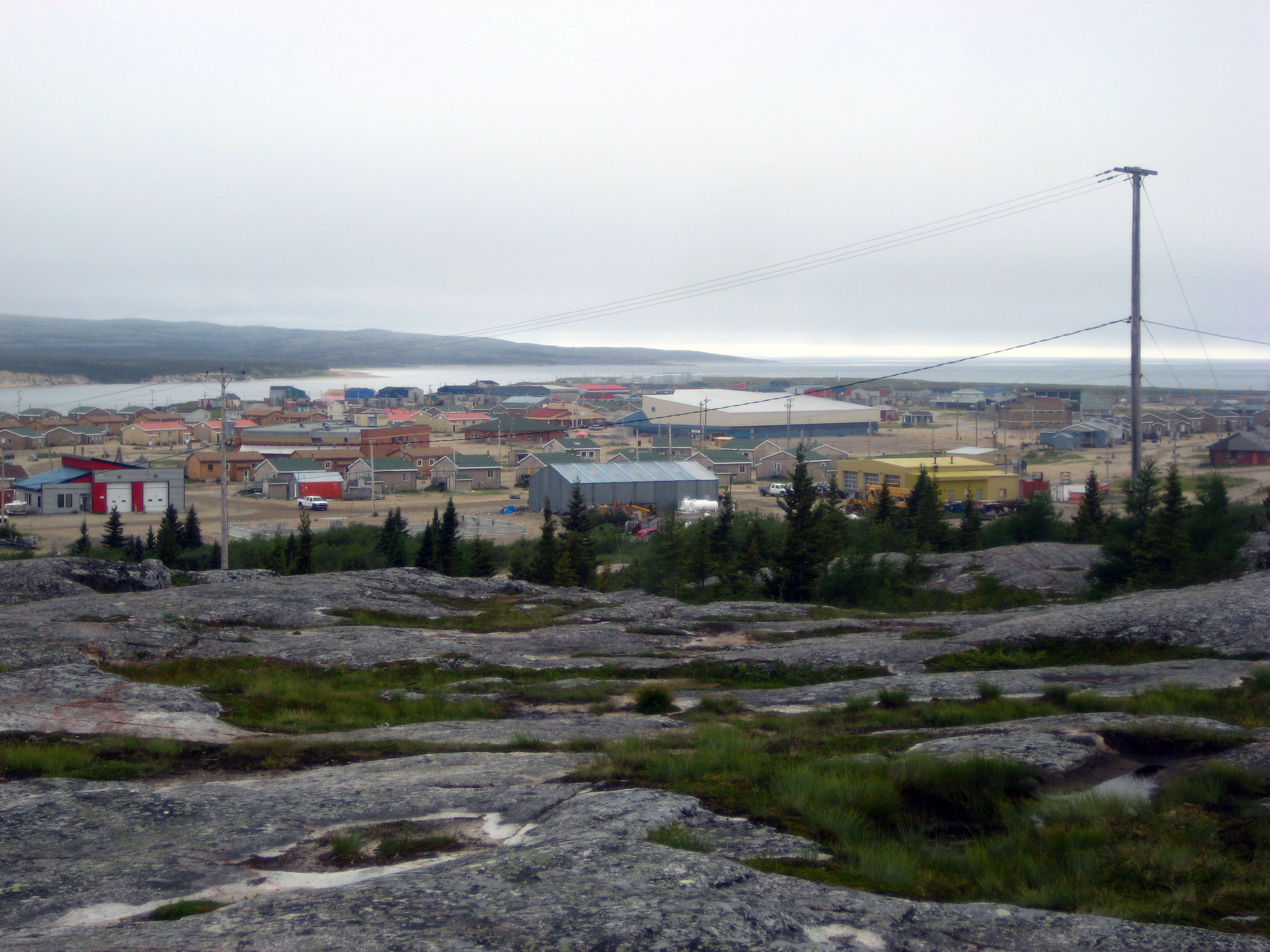
- Partial view of the village, as seen from the hills to the east

- Location within Quebec
- Coordinates (412, avenue Saint-Edmund): 55°17′N 077°45′W
- Country: Canada
- Province: Quebec
- Region: Nord-du-Québec
- TE: Kativik
- Settled: 1821 (HBC post)
- Constituted: 7 June 1980

Government
  - Mayor: Anthony Ittoshat
  - Federal riding: Abitibi—Baie-James—Nunavik—Eeyou
  - Prov. riding: Ungava

Area
  - Total: 7.00 km^{2} (2.70 sq mi)
  - Land: 7.45 km^{2} (2.88 sq mi)
- There is an apparent contradiction between two authoritative sources

Population (2021)
  - Total: 792
  - Density: 106.3/km^{2} (275/sq mi)
  - Change (2016–21): ▲21.1%
  - Dwellings: 267
- Time zone: UTC−5 (EST)
  - Summer (DST): UTC−4 (EDT)
- Postal code(s): J0M 1G0
- Area code: 819

Kuujjuarapik (also spelled Kuujjuaraapik; Inuktitut: ᑰᔾᔪᐊᕌᐱᒃ little great river) is the southernmost northern village (Inuit community) at the mouth of the Great Whale River (French: Grande Rivière de la Baleine) on the coast of Hudson Bay in Nunavik, Quebec, Canada. Almost 1,000 people, mostly Cree, live in the adjacent village of Whapmagoostui. The community is only accessible by air at Kuujjuarapik Airport and, in late summer, by boat. The nearest Inuit village is Umiujaq, about 160 km (99 mi) north-northeast of Kuujjuarapik. The police services in Kuujjuaraapik are provided by the Nunavik Police Service, formerly the Kativik Regional Police Force. Like most other northern villages in Quebec, there is an Inuit reserved land of the same name, Kuujjuarapik. However, unlike most other Inuit reserved lands, the Inuit reserved land of Kuujjuarapik is not adjacent to its eponymous northern village; rather, it is located considerably farther north and in fact borders on the Inuit reserved land of Umiujaq.

Although the permanent cohabitation of Inuit and Cree at the mouth of the Great Whale River only goes back to the year 1950, the two Indigenous peoples were rubbing shoulders in this area for a very long time: Inuit close to the coast and the Cree more in the interior lands.

== History ==
The eastern coast of the Hudson Bay has been inhabited by Paleo-Inuit and Inuit peoples for thousands of years. The Dorset culture site of GhGk-63, dating to around 50 BCE, is located slightly to the north of the village. In 1820, a Hudson's Bay Company (HBC) trading post was built at the mouth of the Great Whale River, known variously as Great Whale River House, Great Whale River or just Great Whale. On maps of 1851 and 1854, the post is called Whale River House and Whale House.

Protestant and Catholic missions settled there in the 1880s. In 1895, a weather station was set up by the Federal Government. Medical and police services began to be offered in the first half of the 20th century, yet it was not settled permanently and only used as a summer encampment. The official 1901 census count for Great Whale River numbers 216, making note of all the Inuit and their families who lived in the surrounding area and who came to trade at Great Whale River over the course of several months. However, the census taker notes of this official number: "I should say it does not represent one-third of the Eskimos, but I am sending on as many (names) as I could obtain."

In the late 1930s, the Inuit were forced to give up their nomadic way of life and settled in the village. In 1940, the American army opened a military air base here, using Inuit and Cree workers. In 1941, the HBC post closed. After the Second World War in 1948, the military base was transferred to the Canadian government and in 1955, it began operating a Mid-Canada Line radar station called RCAF Station Great Whale River. Though the radar station was not operational for long and closed in 1965, it established the village permanently.

In 1961, when the Quebec Government decided to give French names to Nordic places, the name Great Whale River was replaced with Grande-Baleine which itself was replaced a year later with Poste-de-la-Baleine. When the village was incorporated, it officially adopted its current name, a name the Inuit had already been using for some time to designate this place.

Fearing the impact of planned large-scale hydroelectric works on the Great Whale River, a referendum was held in 1982 in which the Inuit decided to relocate to a new village (Umiujaq) some 160 km (99 mi) to the north. A large portion of the Inuit moved there in 1986, causing the population of Kuujjuarapik to drop significantly.

== Climate ==
Predictably, given its northern latitude, Kuujjuarapik has a subarctic climate (Dfc) under the Köppen climate classification, but strongly modified by its location on the southeastern (predominantly windward) shore of Hudson Bay, particularly from May/June through November, the primary season when Hudson Bay's surface is unfrozen, i.e. open water. Winters are long and cold; summers are cool, strongly influenced by the chilly open waters of Hudson Bay, with August (the warmest month, on average) mustering an average monthly high temperature of only 16.1 °C (61.0 °F). Freezing conditions (0 °C (32 °F)) have occurred every month of the year, although the moderating effect of Hudson Bay may hold off the first fall freeze as late as the second week of October in an occasional year, as in 2015. Year-round, climatic conditions are influenced strongly by Hudson Bay's freeze-thaw cycle. January is the coldest month on average; August, the warmest.

The average annual precipitation cycle demonstrates a minimum from mid-winter (January) to mid-spring (May), with sharply rising average monthly precipitation amounts beginning in June, reaching a peak in September, but with only slowly falling average monthly precipitation amounts from September to November. As such, compared to most Northern Hemisphere sub-Arctic climates (which usually have strong precipitation maximums between June and August, usually July), Kuujjuarapik demonstrates a strong tendency favouring a relatively drier spring and relatively wetter autumn. This pattern is a direct consequence of Kuujjuarapik's location on the lee shore of Hudson Bay. Similar to a pattern evident in heavily "lake-influenced" areas around the U.S. Great Lakes (i.e. Holland and Sault Ste. Marie, Michigan), in spring and early summer, water temperatures are cooler than those of surrounding land areas, encouraging low clouds and fog, but also stable conditions and less precipitation. In fall and early winter, the pattern is reversed: water temperatures are warmer than those of surrounding land areas, encouraging cumulus cloud formation and unstable conditions, meaning low-pressure systems passing from cooler land to warmer water often intensify.

In Kuujjuarapik, this pattern means average monthly precipitation peaks in September – when increasingly cold air masses passing eastward and southeastward across the open waters of Hudson Bay are warmed and destabilized by their over-water passage, producing thick clouds and frequent, often-heavy instability rain (and from October to December, snow) showers. This pattern also results in the heaviest average monthly average snowfall amounts coming from October to January, but concentrated in November and December, with "Hudson-Bay effect" snows most common, and markedly less average monthly snowfall from February to May. From late November into December, Hudson Bay freezes, and by January, its frozen surface provides little modification to Arctic air masses, and less moisture, i.e. snow, to Kuujjuarapik. Also, because Hudson Bay in the fall is open water into mid to late November when freezing begins, the speed of temperature fall during the autumn months is relatively slight from August to October, and steepest from November to January (by which time the bay is fully frozen over).

Overall, Kuujjuarapik's climate is severe and sub-Arctic, but with a relatively slow temperature fall from summer to November due to water influence and delayed freezing of Hudson Bay (late November into December), and a dry spring and wet and stormy fall. Further evidencing these patterns is monthly sunshine data (as a percentage of daylight hours), which shows a marked maximum most months from February to July, and a marked minimum from September to December, when "Bay-induced" cloud cover is highest; in November, the cloudiest month, average sunshine bottoms out at only 13.5% of available daylight hours. Considering its marine position on the 55th parallel, the climate is extremely cold when compared with cities like Glasgow and Copenhagen in northern Europe and Chinook-affected areas further to the west in Canada's interior.

Climate data for Kuujjuarapik (Kuujjuarapik Airport) Climate ID: 7103536; coordinates 55°17′N 77°45′W; elevation: 12.2 m (40 ft); 1991–2020 normals, extremes 1925–present
Month	Jan	Feb	Mar	Apr	May	Jun	Jul	Aug	Sep	Oct	Nov	Dec	Year
Record high humidex	3.3	5.2	10.7	21.5	33.5	38.7	41.9	38.9	36.5	27.0	12.5	6.9	41.9
Record high °C (°F)	3.5 (38.3)	9.4 (48.9)	12.1 (53.8)	21.9 (71.4)	35.3 (95.5)	33.9 (93.0)	37.0 (98.6)	33.3 (91.9)	33.9 (93.0)	23.9 (75.0)	11.8 (53.2)	7.2 (45.0)	37.0 (98.6)
Mean daily maximum °C (°F)	−17.2 (1.0)	−17.2 (1.0)	−10.5 (13.1)	−2.5 (27.5)	6.2 (43.2)	12.6 (54.7)	16.6 (61.9)	16.2 (61.2)	11.8 (53.2)	5.8 (42.4)	−1.1 (30.0)	−9.8 (14.4)	0.9 (33.6)
Daily mean °C (°F)	−21.3 (−6.3)	−22.3 (−8.1)	−16.0 (3.2)	−7.3 (18.9)	1.8 (35.2)	7.6 (45.7)	11.9 (53.4)	12.4 (54.3)	8.5 (47.3)	3.2 (37.8)	−3.7 (25.3)	−13.2 (8.2)	−3.2 (26.2)
Mean daily minimum °C (°F)	−25.3 (−13.5)	−27.5 (−17.5)	−21.5 (−6.7)	−12.2 (10.0)	−2.7 (27.1)	2.5 (36.5)	7.2 (45.0)	8.6 (47.5)	5.1 (41.2)	0.5 (32.9)	−6.2 (20.8)	−16.5 (2.3)	−7.3 (18.9)
Record low °C (°F)	−49.4 (−56.9)	−48.9 (−56.0)	−45.0 (−49.0)	−33.9 (−29.0)	−25.0 (−13.0)	−7.8 (18.0)	−2.2 (28.0)	−1.1 (30.0)	−6.1 (21.0)	−15.0 (5.0)	−28.9 (−20.0)	−46.1 (−51.0)	−49.4 (−56.9)
Record low wind chill	−62.6	−62.3	−58.8	−44.5	−30.2	−12.2	−7.5	−5.4	−9.7	−21.3	−38.0	−56.4	−62.6
Average precipitation mm (inches)	29.4 (1.16)	18.7 (0.74)	23.5 (0.93)	20.4 (0.80)	39.8 (1.57)	56.6 (2.23)	82.4 (3.24)	84.5 (3.33)	107.6 (4.24)	83.7 (3.30)	65.1 (2.56)	52.4 (2.06)	664.0 (26.14)
Average rainfall mm (inches)	1.0 (0.04)	0.1 (0.00)	2.4 (0.09)	5.3 (0.21)	26.1 (1.03)	55.1 (2.17)	79.5 (3.13)	84.2 (3.31)	107.3 (4.22)	59.8 (2.35)	14.4 (0.57)	0.9 (0.04)	436.1 (17.17)
Average snowfall cm (inches)	28.9 (11.4)	19.2 (7.6)	21.5 (8.5)	15.1 (5.9)	12.9 (5.1)	1.5 (0.6)	0.0 (0.0)	0.0 (0.0)	1.8 (0.7)	23.2 (9.1)	53.0 (20.9)	53.1 (20.9)	230.0 (90.6)
Average precipitation days (≥ 0.2 mm)	18.3	13.4	12.6	11.3	12.4	11.7	14.4	17.2	20.5	21.4	22.6	21.1	197.0
Average rainy days (≥ 0.2 mm)	0.43	0.25	0.95	2.6	7.7	10.6	14.0	17.1	20.2	15.5	5.2	1.1	95.5
Average snowy days (≥ 0.2 cm)	18.2	13.3	12.2	9.5	6.8	1.9	0.0	0.0	1.1	10.0	20.6	20.8	114.3
Average relative humidity (%) (at 1500 LST)	71.1	68.5	69.1	72.7	70.7	70.1	72.6	74.9	75.8	76.2	80.0	78.3	73.3
Mean monthly sunshine hours	71.7	112.7	155.8	165.2	166.4	205.0	213.5	163.7	81.8	64.4	34.2	40.0	1,474.3
Percentage possible sunshine	29.6	41.5	42.5	39.0	33.2	39.4	41.0	35.2	21.3	19.8	13.5	17.8	31.2
Source: Environment and Climate Change Canada (sun 1981–2010)

== Demographics ==
In the 2021 Census of Population conducted by Statistics Canada, Kuujjuarapik had a population of 792 living in 249 of its 267 total private dwellings, a change of 21.1% from its 2016 population of 654. With a land area of 7.45 km^{2} (2.88 sq mi), it had a population density of 106.3/km^{2} (275.3/sq mi) in 2021.

Population trend:

- Population in 2021: 792 (2016 to 2021 population change: 21.1%)
- Population in 2016: 686 (2011 to 2016 population change: 4.4%)
- Population in 2011: 657
- Population in 2006: 568
- Population in 2001: 555
- Population in 1996: 579
- Population in 1991: 605

== Education ==
The Kativik School Board operates the Asimauttaq School.

== Notable people ==
- Mina Napartuk (1913–2001), artist
- Annie Ittoshat (1970–), Anglican bishop

== See also ==
- List of anglophone communities in Quebec
- North West River/Sheshatshiu, adjacent Inuit/Cree (Innu) communities in Labrador.
