= RCAF Station Great Whale River =

- Mid-Canada Line Sector Control Station 400
- Part of Mid-Canada Line
- Kuujjuarapik, Quebec, Canada

Site information
- Controlled by: Royal Canadian Air Force

Location
- Location of MCL Site 400
- Coordinates: 55.277°N 77.739°W

Site history
- Built: 1955
- Built by: Royal Canadian Air Force
- In use: 1955 - April 1965

RCAF Station Great Whale River was located at the mouth of the river with the same name on the shore of Hudson Bay. The town surrounding the former base is now known by its native name of Kuujjuarapik. Originally built in 1955 as a detachment, it was elevated to station status in 1957 when it became Sector Control Station 400 of the Mid-Canada Line. After the Mid-Canada Line project was terminated there was no longer any need for a military presence at the site, and RCAF Station Great Whale River closed on April 2, 1965. While in operation, the station was supported by RCAF Station St. Hubert. The station's gravel runway is now administered by the government of Quebec for Kuujjuarapik airport and runs parallel to the shore of Hudson Bay.
