= Mina Napartuk =

Canadian Inuk artist

- Born: 1913; Kuujjuarapik, Quebec, Canada
- Died: 2001 (aged 87–88); Umiujaq, Quebec, Canada
- Known for: Textile Art

Mina Napartuk (1913 – 2001) was a Canadian Inuk artist known for her fabric and fur crafts, as well as her management of the women's craft shop in Kuujjuarapik.

== Biography ==
Napartuk was born in 1913 in Kuujjuarapik, Quebec. She trained in the traditional arts of working with fur, skins, and fabric to create dolls, clothing (including kamiks), and wall-hangings known as akinnamiutak. Starting in the 1980s Napartuk managed the women's craftshop in Kuujjuarapik which focused on traditional crafts of the area. In the mid-1980s she moved to nearby Umiujaq.

Selected exhibitions that Napartuk's work has appeared in include Group Show of Wallhangings at the Innuit Gallery of Eskimo Art; Things Made by Inuit at La Federation des Cooperatives du Nouveau-Quebec; and Inuit Art: A Selection of Inuit Art from the Collection of the National Museum of Man, Ottawa, and the Rothmans Permanent Collection of Inuit Sculpture, Canada at the National Museum of Man, Ottawa.

She has participated in workshops in Montreal and Toronto.

Napartuk died in 2001 in Umiujaq.
