= Kativik Ilisarniliriniq =

School board in Quebec

Kativik Ilisarniliriniq (Inuktitut: ᑲᑎᕕᒃ ᐃᓕᓴᕐᓂᓕᕆᓂᖅ, KI (Note: The Quebec Ministry of Education uses the English acronym KISB for "Kativik Ilisarniliriniq School Board" and the French acronym CSKI for "Conseil scolaire Kativik Ilisarniliriniq".), formerly known in English as the Kativik School Board (KSB, French: Commission scolaire Kativik, CSK), is a school district with territory in Nunavik in northern Quebec; its headquarters is in the Saint-Laurent area of Montreal, and it also has an office in Kuujjuaq.

While most Quebec school boards are categorized by language, this district is categorized as a "special-status school board".

== History ==
It was created as part of the James Bay and Northern Quebec Agreement (JBNQA), and in 1975 the school district came into existence. The district began operations in 1978.

The district headquarters were placed in Dorval so the administration would be in proximity to the Quebec government. The headquarters were later placed in Notre-Dame-de-Grâce (NDG), Montreal. In 1998 Quebec Minister of Education Pauline Marois stated she would support the headquarters moving to Nunavik.

In 1980 there was a community boycott against the Kativik School Board in Ivujivik and Povungnituk as people there disliked the James Bay Agreement and therefore shunned the school district as they perceived it as close to the people who accepted the agreement. That year, the government of Quebec planned to open its own school there.

The provincial education ministry requested that the district adopt certain reforms in its mathematics and science programs by 2012; when this did not happen, in 2014 the ministry stopped the district's ability to issue regular high school diplomas effective June 2015; instead "attestation of equivalence of secondary studies" became available. The district did not inform the students and community of the change until 2017. President of the district board Alicie Nalukturuk accused the ministry of ignoring requests for help on issues in the community.

The school board and John Abbott College jointly established some post-secondary sources.

== Schools ==
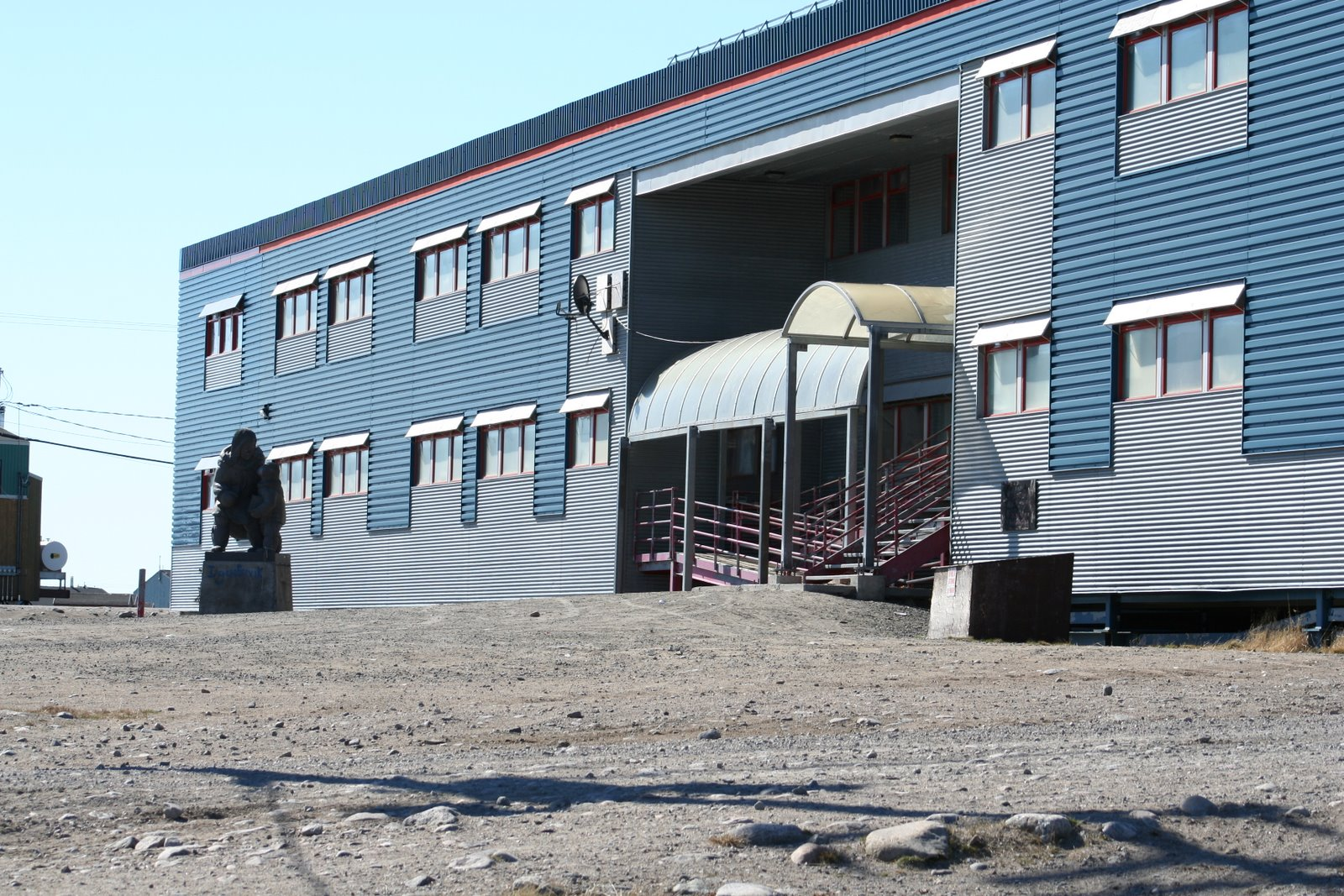
Iguarsivik School in Puvirnituq

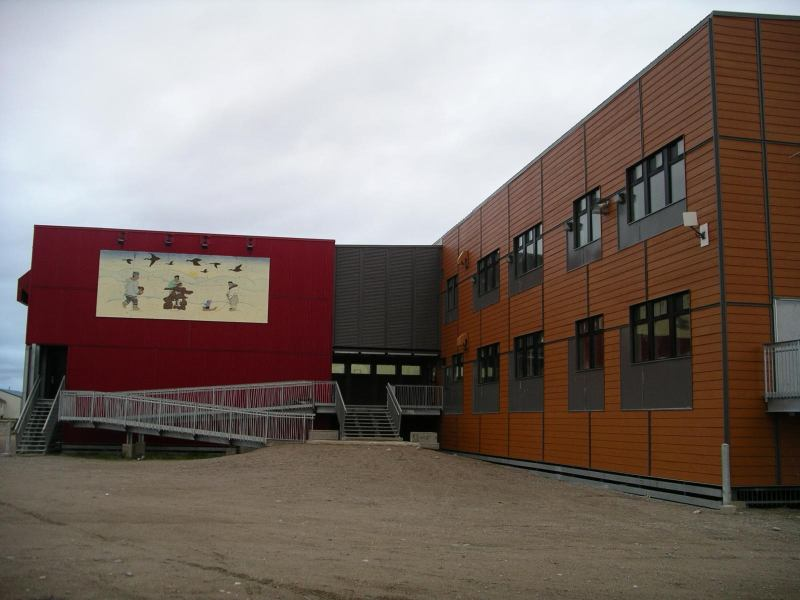
Ajagutak School in Tasiujaq

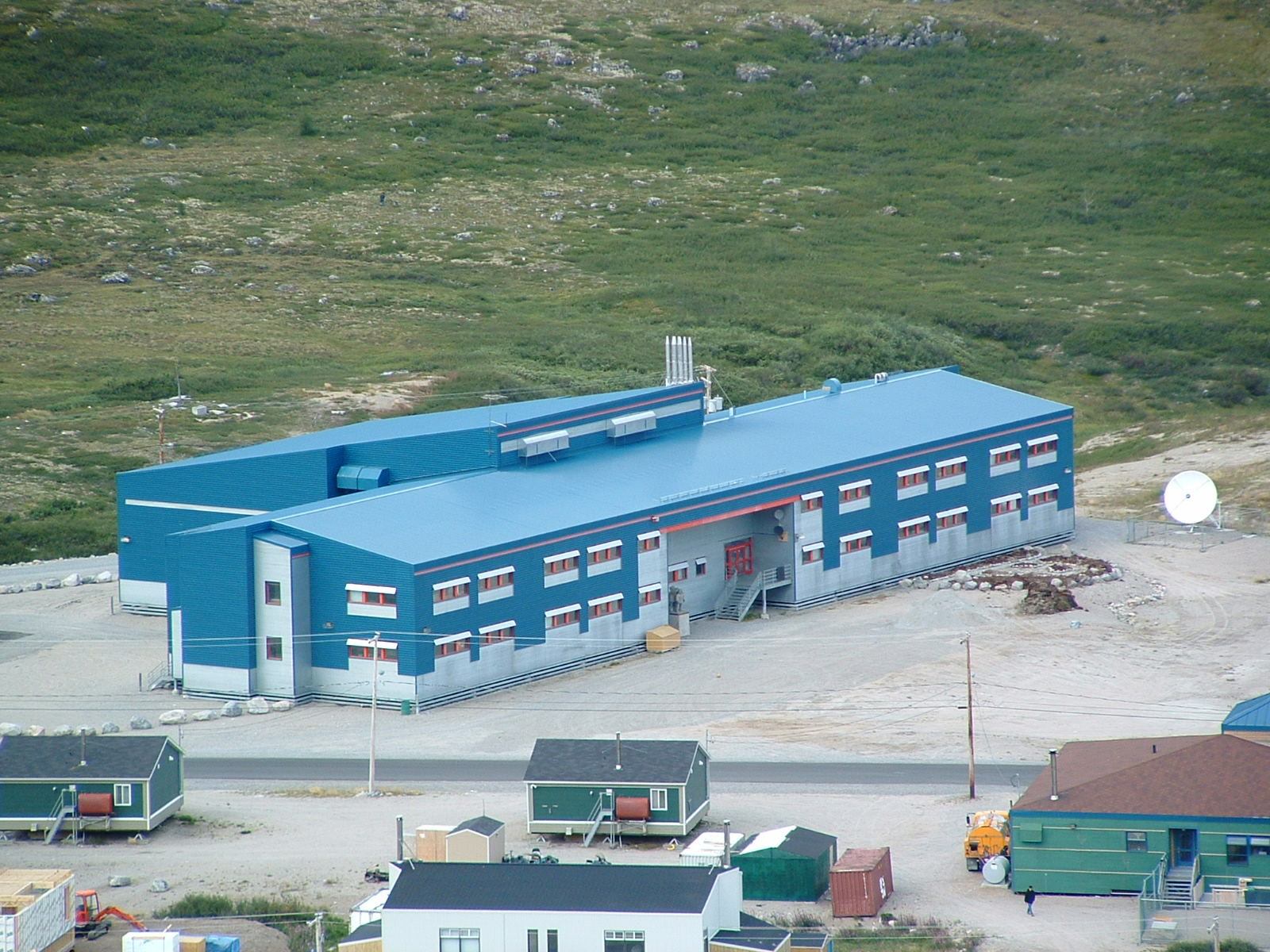
Ulluriaq School in Kangiqsualujjuaq

- Tukisiniarvik School (Akulivik)
- Tarsakallak School (Aupaluk)
- Innalik School (Inukjuak)
- Nuvviti School (Ivujivik)
- Ulluriaq School (Kangiqsualujjuaq)
- Arsaniq School (Kangiqsujuaq)
- Sautjuit School (Kangirsuk)
- Asimauttaq School (Kuujjuaraapik)
- Jaanimmarik School (Kuujjuaq)
- Pitakallak School (Kuujjuaq)
- Iguarsivik School (Puvirnituq)
- Ikaarvik School (Puvirnituq)
- Isummasaqvik School (Quaqtaq)
- Ikusik School (Salluit)
- Ajagutak School (Tasiujaq)
- Kiluutaq School (Umiujaq)

In 1985, of the district's schools, a total of fourteen had up to grade nine, and of those, six had up to the final year of high school. At the time some students attended schools in Montreal for grades 10–11; Quebec's high school system ends at grade 11.

=== Former schools ===
The board formerly operated the Ulluriaq School, previously the Satuumavik School, in Kangiqsualujjuaq.

The district formerly operated the Kativik Senior Education Centre in Dorval, Quebec. In the district's early history, senior high school students had to attend classes there to get a high school diploma. During its history, most students dropped out of the program rather than completing it; the centre was a long distance from Nunavik.

== See also ==
Indigenous school boards in Quebec:

- Ahkwesahsne Mohawk Board of Education
- Cree School Board
