= Whapmagoostui (Cree village municipality) =

Whapmagoostui ᐙᐱᒫᑯᔥᑐᐃ
- Cree village municipality
- Location within Quebec
- Coordinates: 55°15′N 77°45′W
- Country: Canada
- Province: Quebec
- Region: Nord-du-Québec
- RCM-Equivalent: Eeyou Istchee
- Constituted: June 28, 1978

Government
  - Mayor: Losty Mamianskum
  - Federal riding: Abitibi—Baie-James—Nunavik—Eeyou
  - Prov. riding: Ungava

Area
  - Total: 115.10 km^{2} (44.44 sq mi)
  - Land: 122.53 km^{2} (47.31 sq mi)
- There is an apparent contradiction between two authoritative sources

Population (2011)
  - Total: 0
  - Density: 0/km^{2} (0/sq mi)
  - Change (2006–11): N/A
  - Dwellings: 0
- Time zone: UTC−05:00 (EST)
  - Summer (DST): UTC−04:00 (EDT)
- Postal code(s): J0M 1G0
- Area code: 819
- Website: www.whapmagoostuifn.ca

Whapmagoostui (Cree: ᐙᐱᒫᑯᔥᑐᐃ/Wâpimâkuštui, "place of the beluga") is a Cree village municipality in the territory of Eeyou Istchee in northern Quebec; it has a distinct legal status and classification from other kinds of village municipalities in Quebec: Naskapi village municipalities, northern villages (Inuit communities), and ordinary villages.

As with all other Cree village municipalities in Quebec, there is a counterpart Cree reserved land of the same name located nearby: Whapmagoostui.

== Demographics ==
Despite the title of "village municipality" and the formalities that go along with it (for instance, having a mayor), Statistics Canada lists Whapmagoostui, Village Cri Census Subdivision (and all other Cree village municipalities in Quebec) as having no resident population or residential infrastructure (dwellings); it is the Cree reserved lands that are listed as having population and residential dwellings in Canadian censuses.

In the 2021 Census of Population conducted by Statistics Canada, Whapmagoostui Village Cri Census Subdivision had a population of 0 living in 0 of its 0 total private dwellings, no change from its 2016 population of 0. With a land area of 120.86 km^{2} (46.66 sq mi), it had a population density of 0.0/km^{2} (0.0/sq mi) in 2021.

=== Climate ===
Predictably, given its northern latitude, Whapmagoostui has a subarctic climate (Dfc) under the Köppen climate classification, but strongly modified by its location on the southeastern (predominantly windward) shore of Hudson Bay, particularly from May/June through November, the primary season when Hudson Bay's surface is unfrozen, i.e. open water. Winters are long and cold; summers are cool, strongly influenced by the chilly open waters of Hudson Bay, with August (the warmest month, on average) mustering an average monthly high temperature of only 16.1 °C (61.0 °F). Freezing conditions (0 °C (32 °F)) have occurred every month of the year, although the moderating effect of Hudson Bay may hold off the first fall freeze as late as the second week of October in an occasional year, as in 2015. Year-round, climatic conditions are influenced strongly by Hudson Bay's freeze-thaw cycle. January is the coldest month on average; August, the warmest.

The average annual precipitation cycle demonstrates a minimum from mid-winter (January) to mid-spring (May), with sharply rising average monthly precipitation amounts beginning in June, reaching a peak in September, but with only slowly falling average monthly precipitation amounts from September to November. As such, compared to most Northern Hemisphere sub-Arctic climates (which usually have strong precipitation maximums between June and August, usually July), Whapmagoostui demonstrates a strong tendency favouring a relatively drier spring and relatively wetter autumn. This pattern is a direct consequence of Whapmagoostui's location on the lee shore of Hudson Bay. Similar to a pattern evident in heavily "lake-influenced" areas around the U.S. Great Lakes (i.e. Holland and Sault Ste. Marie, Michigan), in spring and early summer, water temperatures are cooler than those of surrounding land areas, encouraging low clouds and fog, but also stable conditions and less precipitation. In fall and early winter, the pattern is reversed: water temperatures are warmer than those of surrounding land areas, encouraging cumulus cloud formation and unstable conditions, meaning low-pressure systems passing from cooler land to warmer water often intensify.

In Whapmagoostui, this pattern means average monthly precipitation peaks in September – when increasingly cold air masses passing eastward and southeastward across the open waters of Hudson Bay are warmed and destabilized by their over-water passage, producing thick clouds and frequent, often-heavy instability rain (and from October to December, snow) showers. This pattern also results in the heaviest average monthly average snowfall amounts coming from October to January, but concentrated in November and December, with "Hudson-Bay effect" snows most common, and markedly less average monthly snowfall from February to May. From late November into December, Hudson Bay freezes, and by January, its frozen surface provides little modification to Arctic air masses, and less moisture, i.e. snow, to Whapmagoostui. Also, because Hudson Bay in the fall is open water into mid to late November when freezing begins, the speed of temperature fall during the autumn months is relatively slight from August to October, and steepest from November to January (by which time the bay is fully frozen over).

Overall, Whapmagoostui's climate is severe and sub-Arctic, but with a relatively slow temperature fall from summer to November due to water influence and delayed freezing of Hudson Bay (late November into December), and a dry spring and wet and stormy fall. Further evidencing these patterns is monthly sunshine data (as a percentage of daylight hours), which shows a marked maximum most months from February to July, and a marked minimum from September to December, when "Bay-induced" cloud cover is highest; in November, the cloudiest month, average sunshine bottoms out at only 13.5% of available daylight hours. Considering its marine position on the 55th parallel, the climate is extremely cold when compared with cities like Glasgow and Copenhagen in northern Europe and Chinook-affected areas further to the west in Canada's interior.

Climate data for Kuujjuarapik (Kuujjuarapik Airport) Climate ID: 7103536; coordinates 55°17′N 77°45′W; elevation: 12.2 m (40 ft); 1991–2020 normals, extremes 1925–present
Month	Jan	Feb	Mar	Apr	May	Jun	Jul	Aug	Sep	Oct	Nov	Dec	Year
Record high humidex	3.3	5.2	10.7	21.5	33.5	38.7	41.9	38.9	36.5	27.0	12.5	6.9	41.9
Record high °C (°F)	3.5 (38.3)	9.4 (48.9)	12.1 (53.8)	21.9 (71.4)	35.3 (95.5)	33.9 (93.0)	37.0 (98.6)	33.3 (91.9)	33.9 (93.0)	23.9 (75.0)	11.8 (53.2)	7.2 (45.0)	37.0 (98.6)
Mean daily maximum °C (°F)	−17.2 (1.0)	−17.2 (1.0)	−10.5 (13.1)	−2.5 (27.5)	6.2 (43.2)	12.6 (54.7)	16.6 (61.9)	16.2 (61.2)	11.8 (53.2)	5.8 (42.4)	−1.1 (30.0)	−9.8 (14.4)	0.9 (33.6)
Daily mean °C (°F)	−21.3 (−6.3)	−22.3 (−8.1)	−16.0 (3.2)	−7.3 (18.9)	1.8 (35.2)	7.6 (45.7)	11.9 (53.4)	12.4 (54.3)	8.5 (47.3)	3.2 (37.8)	−3.7 (25.3)	−13.2 (8.2)	−3.2 (26.2)
Mean daily minimum °C (°F)	−25.3 (−13.5)	−27.5 (−17.5)	−21.5 (−6.7)	−12.2 (10.0)	−2.7 (27.1)	2.5 (36.5)	7.2 (45.0)	8.6 (47.5)	5.1 (41.2)	0.5 (32.9)	−6.2 (20.8)	−16.5 (2.3)	−7.3 (18.9)
Record low °C (°F)	−49.4 (−56.9)	−48.9 (−56.0)	−45.0 (−49.0)	−33.9 (−29.0)	−25.0 (−13.0)	−7.8 (18.0)	−2.2 (28.0)	−1.1 (30.0)	−6.1 (21.0)	−15.0 (5.0)	−28.9 (−20.0)	−46.1 (−51.0)	−49.4 (−56.9)
Record low wind chill	−62.6	−62.3	−58.8	−44.5	−30.2	−12.2	−7.5	−5.4	−9.7	−21.3	−38.0	−56.4	−62.6
Average precipitation mm (inches)	29.4 (1.16)	18.7 (0.74)	23.5 (0.93)	20.4 (0.80)	39.8 (1.57)	56.6 (2.23)	82.4 (3.24)	84.5 (3.33)	107.6 (4.24)	83.7 (3.30)	65.1 (2.56)	52.4 (2.06)	664.0 (26.14)
Average rainfall mm (inches)	1.0 (0.04)	0.1 (0.00)	2.4 (0.09)	5.3 (0.21)	26.1 (1.03)	55.1 (2.17)	79.5 (3.13)	84.2 (3.31)	107.3 (4.22)	59.8 (2.35)	14.4 (0.57)	0.9 (0.04)	436.1 (17.17)
Average snowfall cm (inches)	28.9 (11.4)	19.2 (7.6)	21.5 (8.5)	15.1 (5.9)	12.9 (5.1)	1.5 (0.6)	0.0 (0.0)	0.0 (0.0)	1.8 (0.7)	23.2 (9.1)	53.0 (20.9)	53.1 (20.9)	230.0 (90.6)
Average precipitation days (≥ 0.2 mm)	18.3	13.4	12.6	11.3	12.4	11.7	14.4	17.2	20.5	21.4	22.6	21.1	197.0
Average rainy days (≥ 0.2 mm)	0.43	0.25	0.95	2.6	7.7	10.6	14.0	17.1	20.2	15.5	5.2	1.1	95.5
Average snowy days (≥ 0.2 cm)	18.2	13.3	12.2	9.5	6.8	1.9	0.0	0.0	1.1	10.0	20.6	20.8	114.3
Average relative humidity (%) (at 1500 LST)	71.1	68.5	69.1	72.7	70.7	70.1	72.6	74.9	75.8	76.2	80.0	78.3	73.3
Mean monthly sunshine hours	71.7	112.7	155.8	165.2	166.4	205.0	213.5	163.7	81.8	64.4	34.2	40.0	1,474.3
Percentage possible sunshine	29.6	41.5	42.5	39.0	33.2	39.4	41.0	35.2	21.3	19.8	13.5	17.8	31.2
Source: Environment and Climate Change Canada (sun 1981–2010)

== Gallery ==
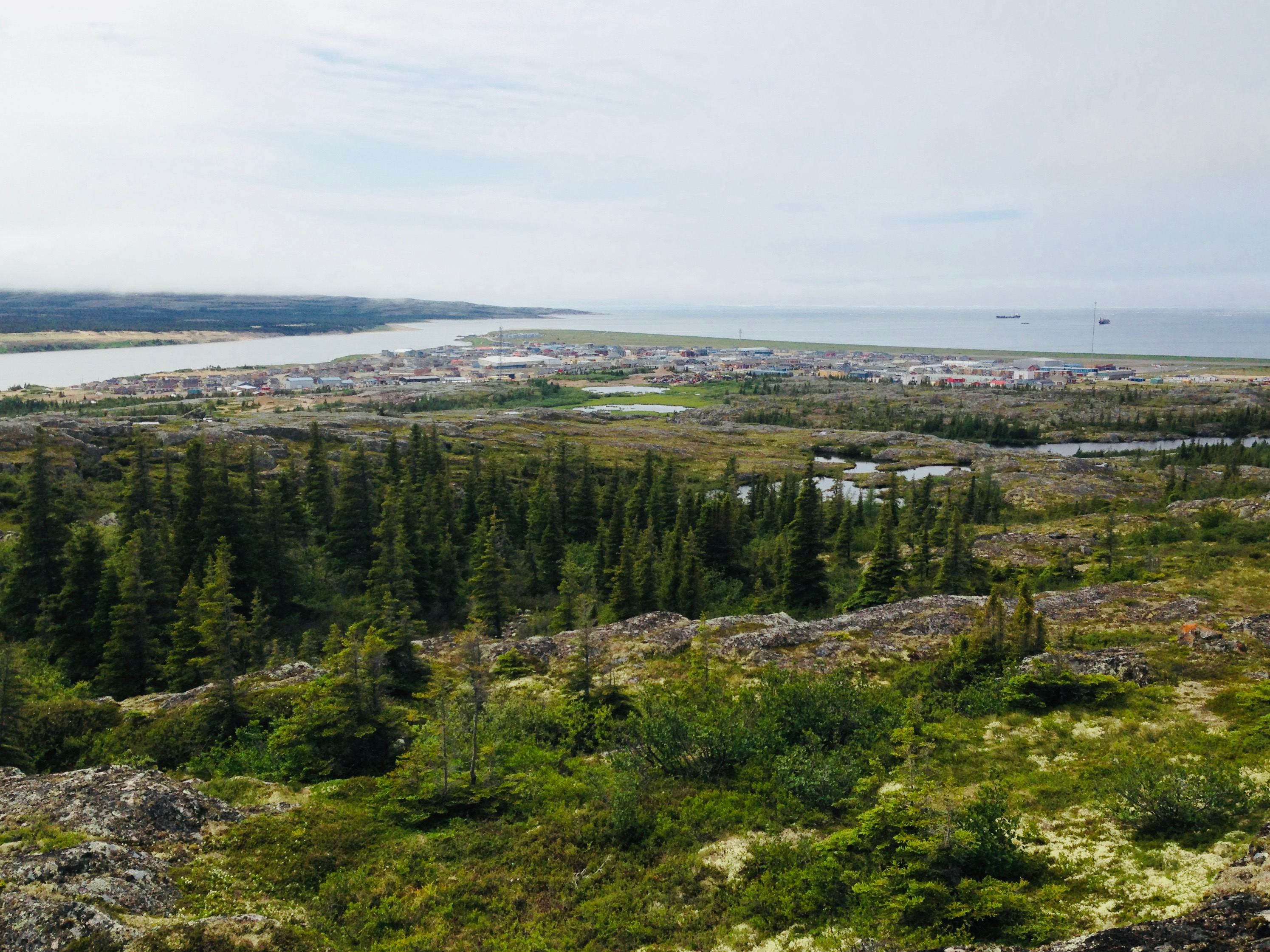

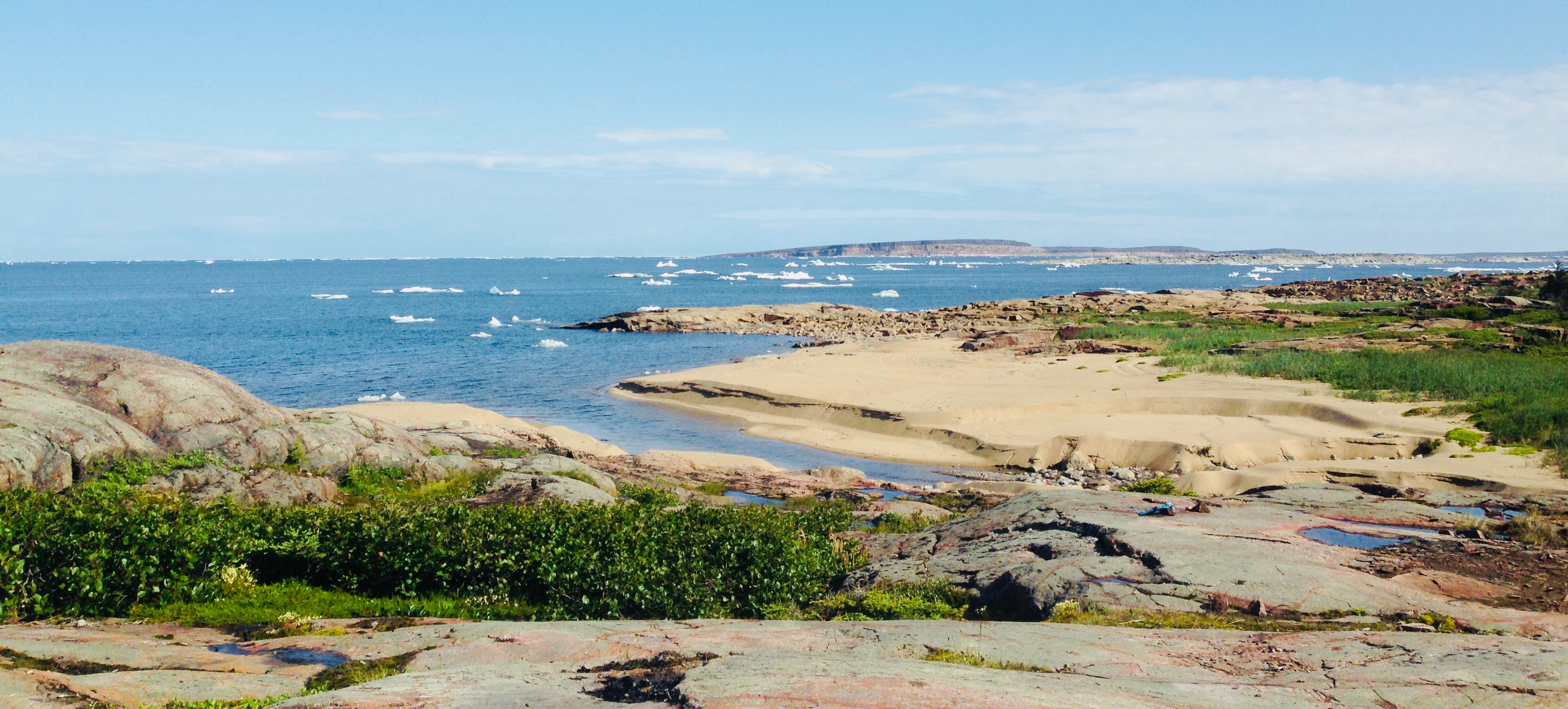

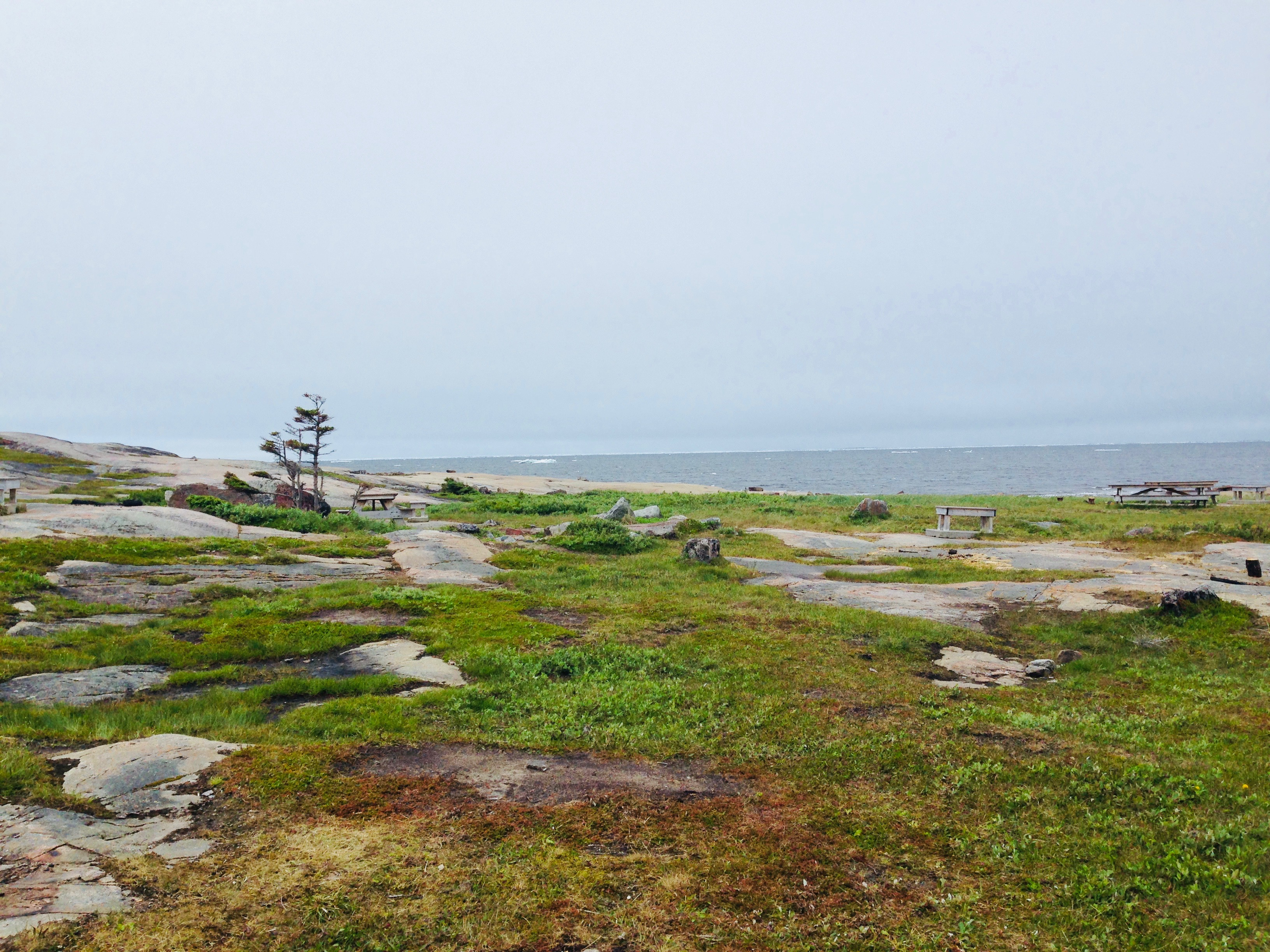

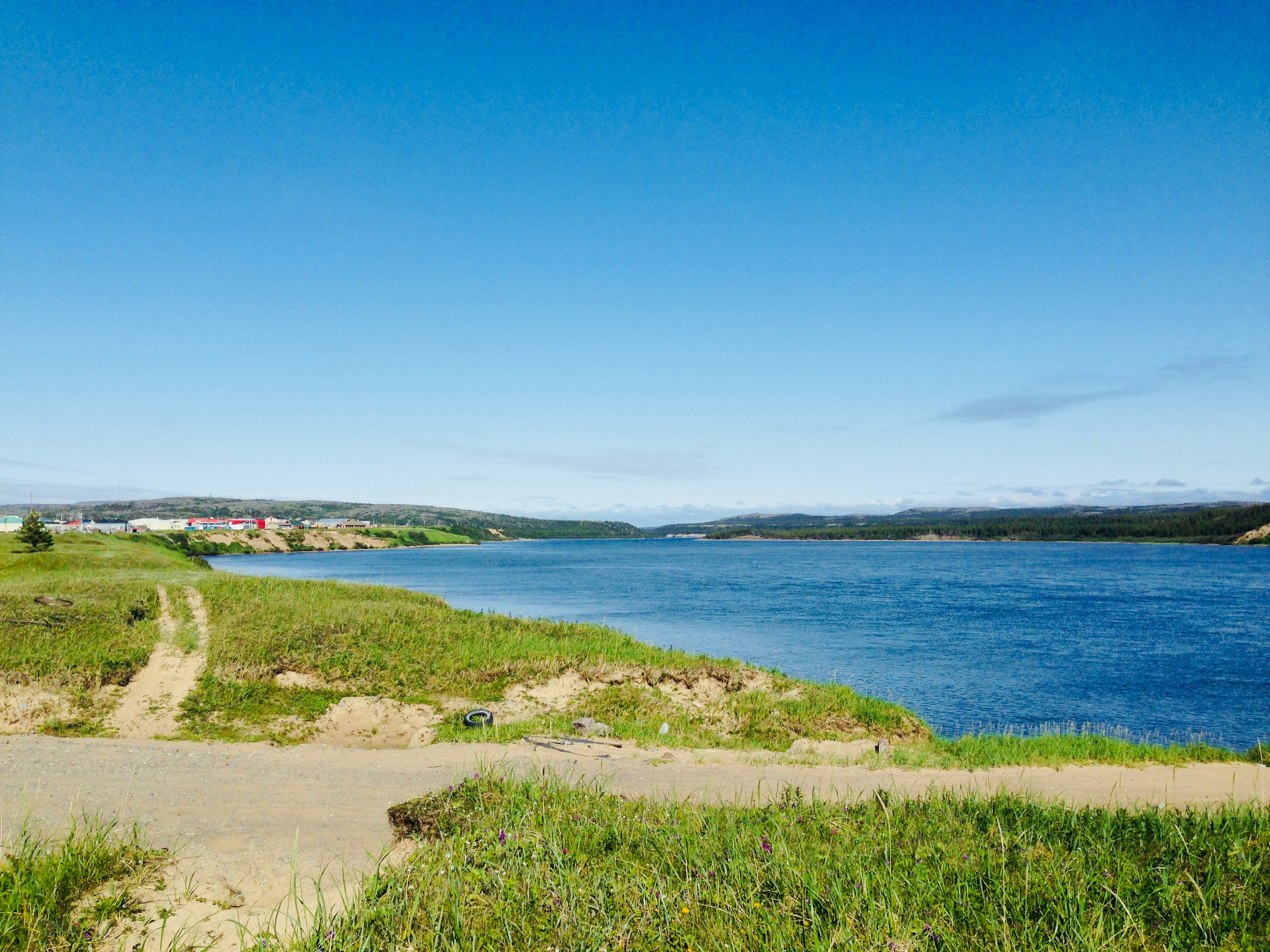

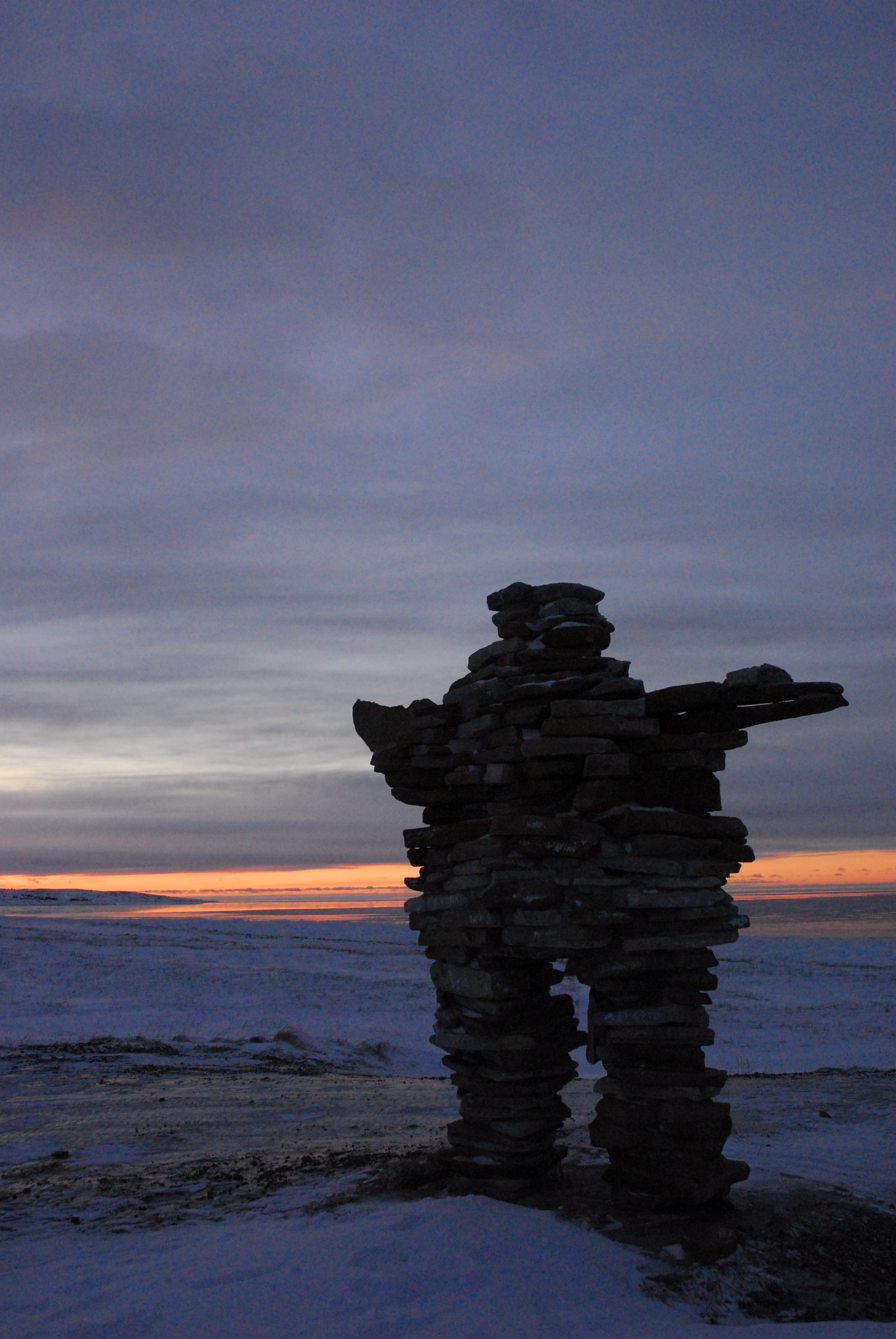

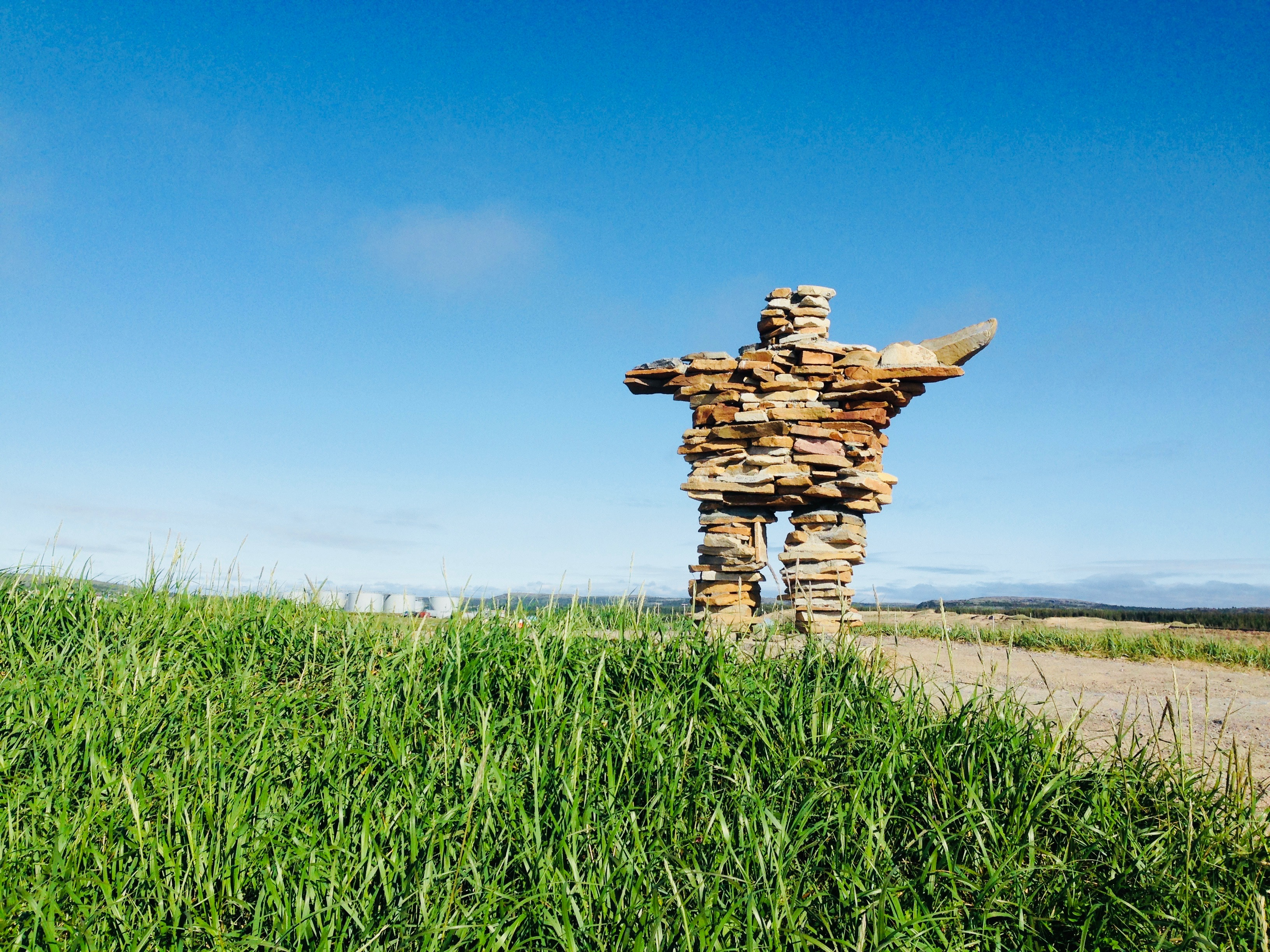

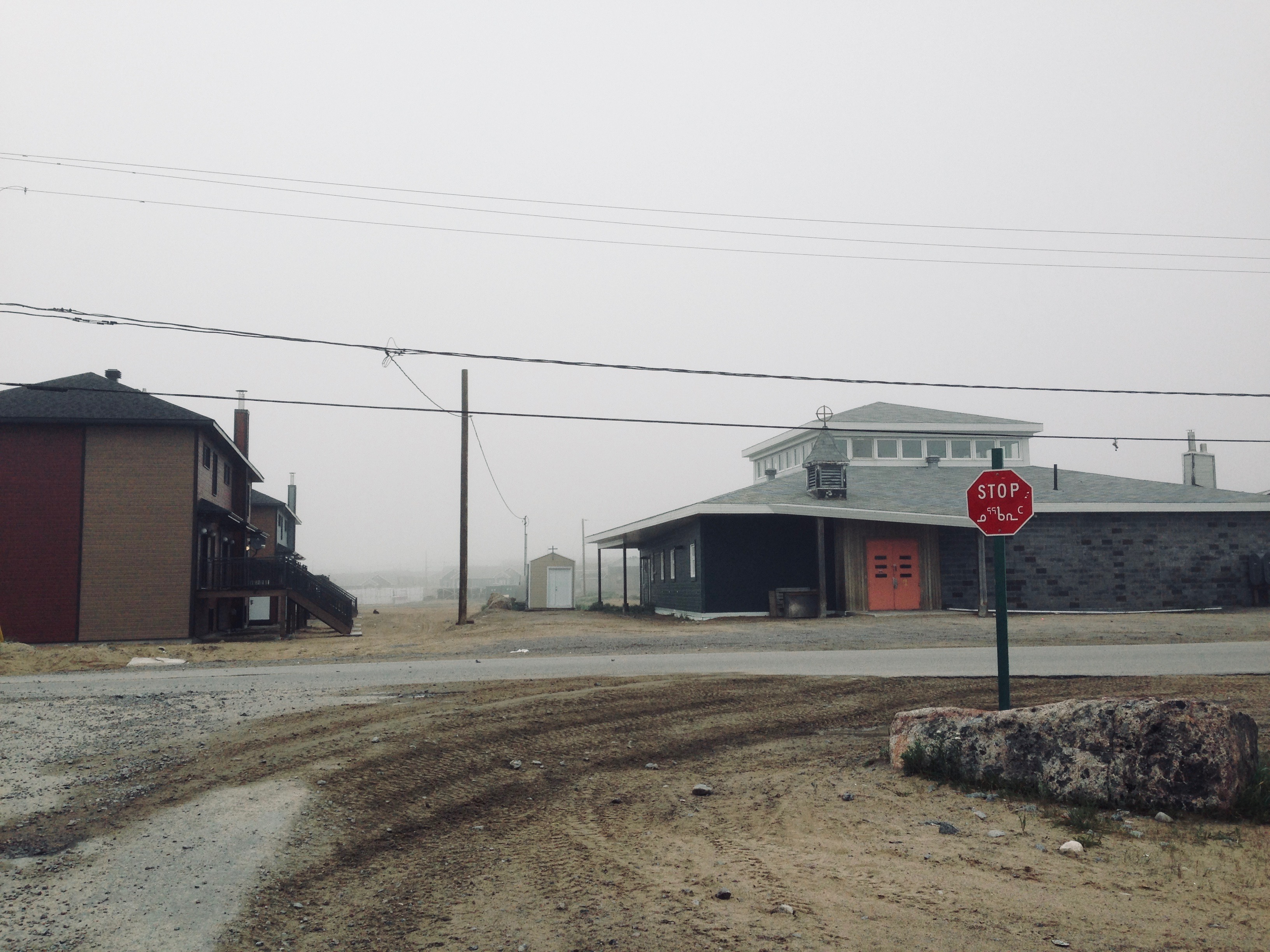

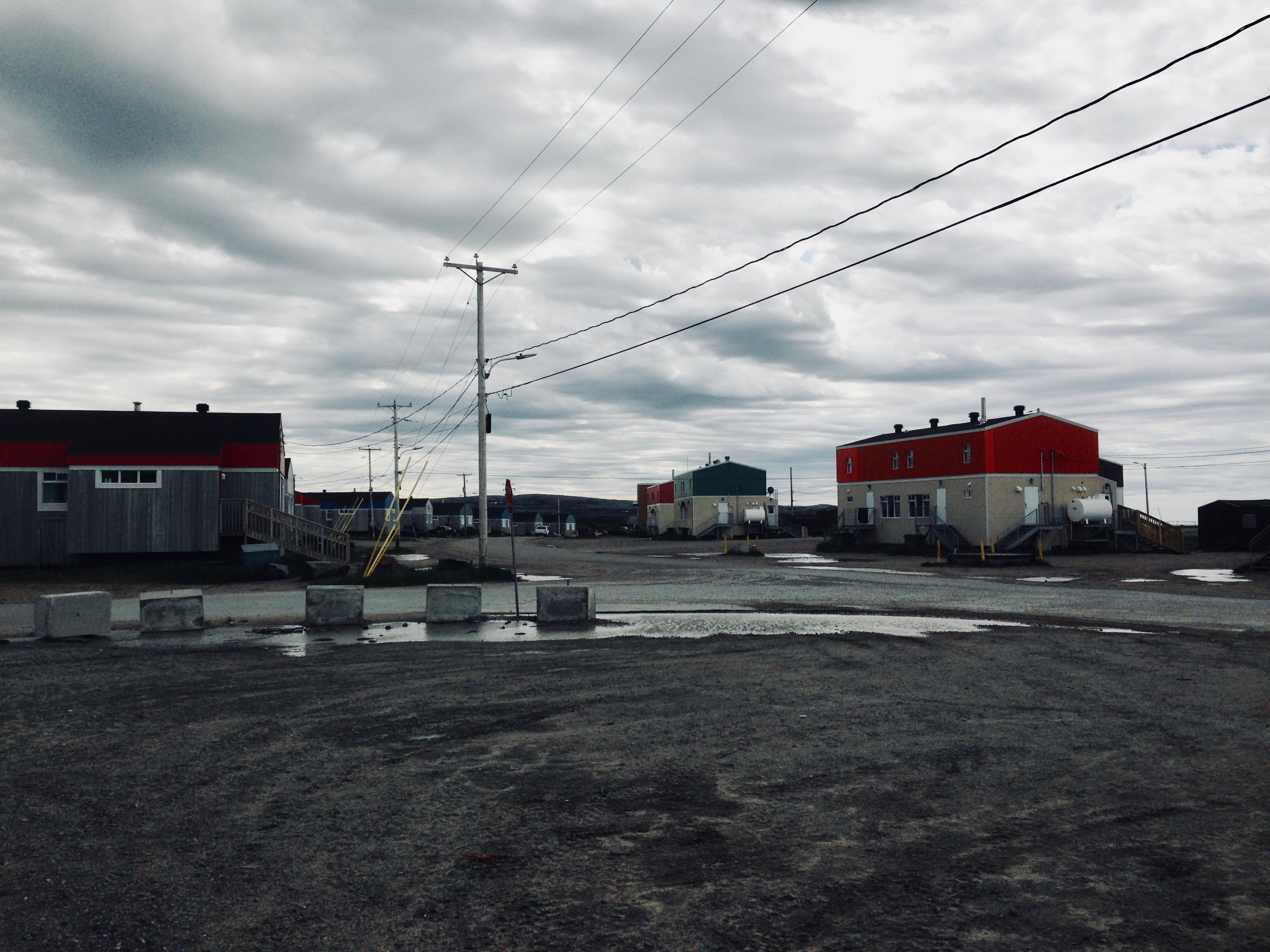
