= Whapmagoostui =

Whapmagoostui ᐙᐱᒫᑯᔥᑐᐃ
- Cree community
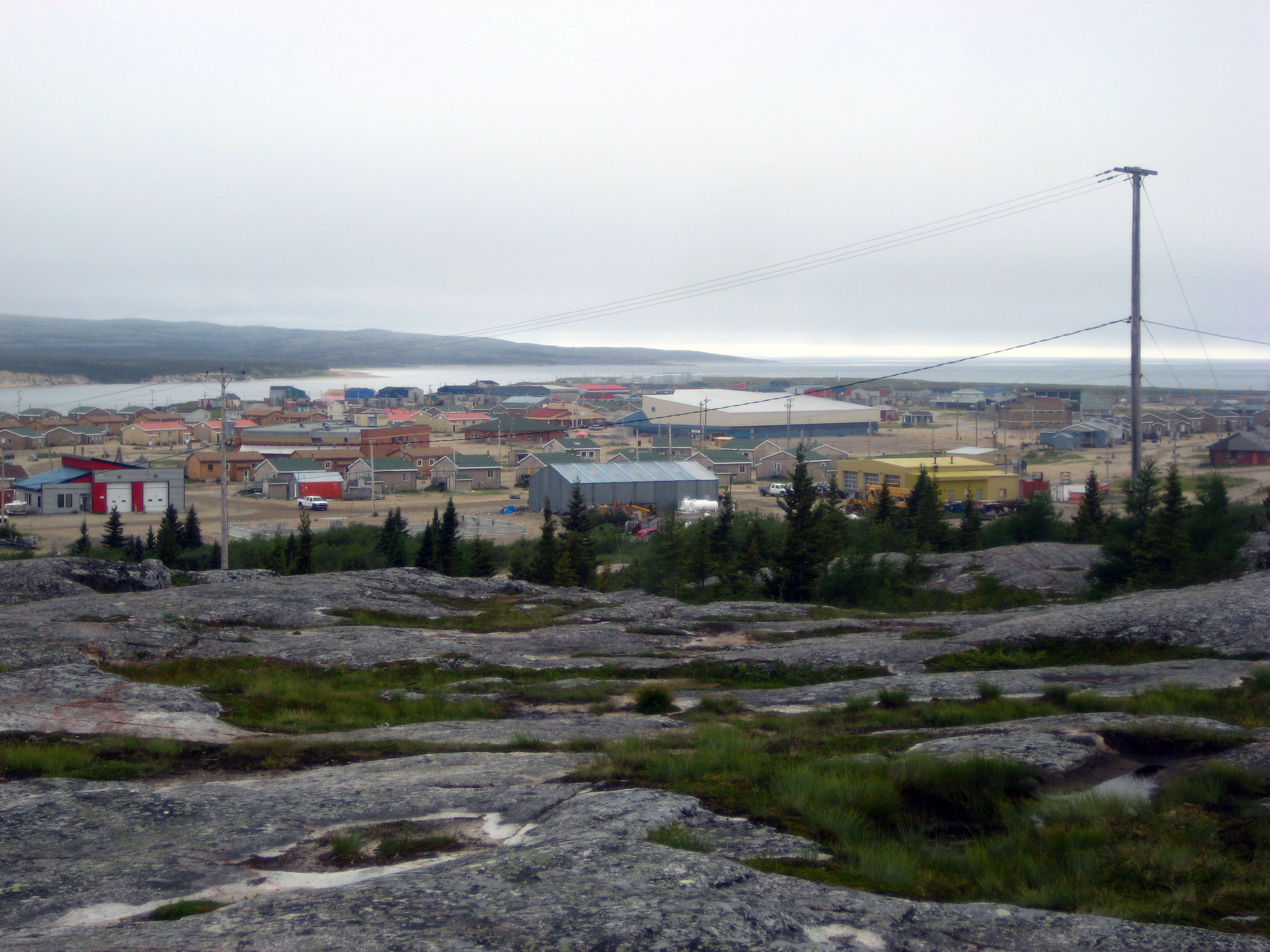
- Partial view of the village, as seen from the hills to the east

- Location within Quebec
- Coordinates: 55°17′N 077°45′W
- Country: Canada
- Province: Quebec
- Region: Nord-du-Québec
- RCM-Equivalent: Eeyou Istchee
- Established: 1821 (HBC post)
- Incorporated: 1978

Government
  - Type: Cree territory
  - Chief: Robbie Kawapit
  - Federal riding: Abitibi—Baie-James—Nunavik—Eeyou
  - Prov. riding: Ungava

Area
  - Total: 202.49 km^{2} (78.18 sq mi)
  - Land: 190.83 km^{2} (73.68 sq mi)

Population (2021)
  - Total: 1,022
  - Density: 5.2/km^{2} (13/sq mi)
  - Change (2016–21): ▲0.6%
  - Dwellings: 251
- Time zone: UTC−05:00 (EST)
  - Summer (DST): UTC−04:00 (EDT)
- Area code: 819 (929 exchange)
- Website: www.whapmagoostui.ca

Whapmagoostui (Cree: ᐙᐱᒫᑯᔥᑐᐃ/Wâpimâkuštui, "place of the beluga") is the northernmost Cree village in Quebec, Canada, located at the mouth of the Great Whale River (French: Grande Rivière de la Baleine) on the coast of Hudson Bay in Nunavik. About 906 Cree with about 650 Inuit, living in the neighbouring village of Kuujjuarapik. The community is accessible only by air (Kuujjuarapik Airport) and, in late summer, by boat. Whapmagoostui is about 250 km (160 mi) north of the nearest Cree village, Chisasibi.

Although the permanent cohabitation of Inuit and Cree at the mouth of the Great Whale River goes back only 1950, the two nations were in close contact with each other in the area for a very long time, with the Inuit close to the coast and the Cree more in the interior.

== Names ==
The village was settled on territory originally named Fort Richmond. The settlement's first official name was Poste-de-la-Baleine.

The name "Whapmagoostui" (Cree: ᐙᐱᒫᑯᔥᑐᐃ/Wâpimâkuštui) is Cree for "place of the beluga".

== Geography ==
The territory of the Cree reserved land of Whapmagoostui must be distinguished from the territory of the homonymous Cree village municipality. The reserved land is located entirely on the north bank of the Great Whale River for a distance of approximately 43 km (27 mi). On the other hand, it does not have any coastline on James Bay, separated from it by the northern village (VN) of Kuujjuarapik and the Inuit reserve land of Kuujjuarapik.

To the north and south of the Cree reserved land is the unorganized territory of Baie-d'Hudson, while the Cree village municipality of Whapmagoostui is to the southwest, east and southeast of the Cree reserved land.

The Cree reserved land includes the urbanized core of Whapmagoostui, which is also bordering that of Kuujjuarapik, like two neighbouring neighbourhoods of the same city.

=== Climate ===
Predictably, given its northern latitude, Whapmagoostui has a subarctic climate (Dfc) under the Köppen climate classification, but strongly modified by its location on the southeastern (predominantly windward) shore of Hudson Bay, particularly from May/June through November, the primary season when Hudson Bay's surface is unfrozen, i.e. open water. Winters are long and cold; summers are cool, strongly influenced by the chilly open waters of Hudson Bay, with August (the warmest month, on average) mustering an average monthly high temperature of only 16.1 °C (61.0 °F). Freezing conditions (0 °C (32 °F)) have occurred every month of the year, although the moderating effect of Hudson Bay may hold off the first fall freeze as late as the second week of October in an occasional year, as in 2015. Year-round, climatic conditions are influenced strongly by Hudson Bay's freeze-thaw cycle. January is the coldest month on average; August, the warmest.

The average annual precipitation cycle demonstrates a minimum from mid-winter (January) to mid-spring (May), with sharply rising average monthly precipitation amounts beginning in June, reaching a peak in September, but with only slowly falling average monthly precipitation amounts from September to November. As such, compared to most Northern Hemisphere sub-Arctic climates (which usually have strong precipitation maximums between June and August, usually July), Whapmagoostui demonstrates a strong tendency favouring a relatively drier spring and relatively wetter autumn. This pattern is a direct consequence of Whapmagoostui's location on the lee shore of Hudson Bay. Similar to a pattern evident in heavily "lake-influenced" areas around the U.S. Great Lakes (i.e. Holland and Sault Ste. Marie, Michigan), in spring and early summer, water temperatures are cooler than those of surrounding land areas, encouraging low clouds and fog, but also stable conditions and less precipitation. In fall and early winter, the pattern is reversed: water temperatures are warmer than those of surrounding land areas, encouraging cumulus cloud formation and unstable conditions, meaning low-pressure systems passing from cooler land to warmer water often intensify.

In Whapmagoostui, this pattern means average monthly precipitation peaks in September – when increasingly cold air masses passing eastward and southeastward across the open waters of Hudson Bay are warmed and destabilized by their over-water passage, producing thick clouds and frequent, often-heavy instability rain (and from October to December, snow) showers. This pattern also results in the heaviest average monthly average snowfall amounts coming from October to January, but concentrated in November and December, with "Hudson-Bay effect" snows most common, and markedly less average monthly snowfall from February to May. From late November into December, Hudson Bay freezes, and by January, its frozen surface provides little modification to Arctic air masses, and less moisture, i.e. snow, to Whapmagoostui. Also, because Hudson Bay in the fall is open water into mid to late November when freezing begins, the speed of temperature fall during the autumn months is relatively slight from August to October, and steepest from November to January (by which time the bay is fully frozen over).

Overall, Whapmagoostui's climate is severe and sub-Arctic, but with a relatively slow temperature fall from summer to November due to water influence and delayed freezing of Hudson Bay (late November into December), and a dry spring and wet and stormy fall. Further evidencing these patterns is monthly sunshine data (as a percentage of daylight hours), which shows a marked maximum most months from February to July, and a marked minimum from September to December, when "Bay-induced" cloud cover is highest; in November, the cloudiest month, average sunshine bottoms out at only 13.5% of available daylight hours. Considering its marine position on the 55th parallel, the climate is extremely cold when compared with cities like Glasgow and Copenhagen in northern Europe and Chinook-affected areas further to the west in Canada's interior.

Climate data for Kuujjuarapik (Kuujjuarapik Airport) Climate ID: 7103536; coordinates 55°17′N 77°45′W; elevation: 12.2 m (40 ft); 1991–2020 normals, extremes 1925–present
Month	Jan	Feb	Mar	Apr	May	Jun	Jul	Aug	Sep	Oct	Nov	Dec	Year
Record high humidex	3.3	5.2	10.7	21.5	33.5	38.7	41.9	38.9	36.5	27.0	12.5	6.9	41.9
Record high °C (°F)	3.5 (38.3)	9.4 (48.9)	12.1 (53.8)	21.9 (71.4)	35.3 (95.5)	33.9 (93.0)	37.0 (98.6)	33.3 (91.9)	33.9 (93.0)	23.9 (75.0)	11.8 (53.2)	7.2 (45.0)	37.0 (98.6)
Mean daily maximum °C (°F)	−17.2 (1.0)	−17.2 (1.0)	−10.5 (13.1)	−2.5 (27.5)	6.2 (43.2)	12.6 (54.7)	16.6 (61.9)	16.2 (61.2)	11.8 (53.2)	5.8 (42.4)	−1.1 (30.0)	−9.8 (14.4)	0.9 (33.6)
Daily mean °C (°F)	−21.3 (−6.3)	−22.3 (−8.1)	−16.0 (3.2)	−7.3 (18.9)	1.8 (35.2)	7.6 (45.7)	11.9 (53.4)	12.4 (54.3)	8.5 (47.3)	3.2 (37.8)	−3.7 (25.3)	−13.2 (8.2)	−3.2 (26.2)
Mean daily minimum °C (°F)	−25.3 (−13.5)	−27.5 (−17.5)	−21.5 (−6.7)	−12.2 (10.0)	−2.7 (27.1)	2.5 (36.5)	7.2 (45.0)	8.6 (47.5)	5.1 (41.2)	0.5 (32.9)	−6.2 (20.8)	−16.5 (2.3)	−7.3 (18.9)
Record low °C (°F)	−49.4 (−56.9)	−48.9 (−56.0)	−45.0 (−49.0)	−33.9 (−29.0)	−25.0 (−13.0)	−7.8 (18.0)	−2.2 (28.0)	−1.1 (30.0)	−6.1 (21.0)	−15.0 (5.0)	−28.9 (−20.0)	−46.1 (−51.0)	−49.4 (−56.9)
Record low wind chill	−62.6	−62.3	−58.8	−44.5	−30.2	−12.2	−7.5	−5.4	−9.7	−21.3	−38.0	−56.4	−62.6
Average precipitation mm (inches)	29.4 (1.16)	18.7 (0.74)	23.5 (0.93)	20.4 (0.80)	39.8 (1.57)	56.6 (2.23)	82.4 (3.24)	84.5 (3.33)	107.6 (4.24)	83.7 (3.30)	65.1 (2.56)	52.4 (2.06)	664.0 (26.14)
Average rainfall mm (inches)	1.0 (0.04)	0.1 (0.00)	2.4 (0.09)	5.3 (0.21)	26.1 (1.03)	55.1 (2.17)	79.5 (3.13)	84.2 (3.31)	107.3 (4.22)	59.8 (2.35)	14.4 (0.57)	0.9 (0.04)	436.1 (17.17)
Average snowfall cm (inches)	28.9 (11.4)	19.2 (7.6)	21.5 (8.5)	15.1 (5.9)	12.9 (5.1)	1.5 (0.6)	0.0 (0.0)	0.0 (0.0)	1.8 (0.7)	23.2 (9.1)	53.0 (20.9)	53.1 (20.9)	230.0 (90.6)
Average precipitation days (≥ 0.2 mm)	18.3	13.4	12.6	11.3	12.4	11.7	14.4	17.2	20.5	21.4	22.6	21.1	197.0
Average rainy days (≥ 0.2 mm)	0.43	0.25	0.95	2.6	7.7	10.6	14.0	17.1	20.2	15.5	5.2	1.1	95.5
Average snowy days (≥ 0.2 cm)	18.2	13.3	12.2	9.5	6.8	1.9	0.0	0.0	1.1	10.0	20.6	20.8	114.3
Average relative humidity (%) (at 1500 LST)	71.1	68.5	69.1	72.7	70.7	70.1	72.6	74.9	75.8	76.2	80.0	78.3	73.3
Mean monthly sunshine hours	71.7	112.7	155.8	165.2	166.4	205.0	213.5	163.7	81.8	64.4	34.2	40.0	1,474.3
Percentage possible sunshine	29.6	41.5	42.5	39.0	33.2	39.4	41.0	35.2	21.3	19.8	13.5	17.8	31.2
Source: Environment and Climate Change Canada (sun 1981–2010)

== History ==
The Cree have hunted and fished along the Hudson Bay coast long before the arrival of Europeans, it was not until 1820 when a trading post was built here by the Hudson's Bay Company, and known variously as Great Whale River House, Great Whale River or just Great Whale. On maps of 1851 and 1854, the post is called Whale River House and Whale House. Protestant and Catholic missions settled there in the 1880s. In 1895, a weather station was set up by the Federal Government. Medical and police services began to be offered in the first half of the 20th century. Yet the Cree would not settle here permanently and only used it as a summer encampment.

In 1940 the Cree were forced to give up their nomadic way of life when the American army opened a military air base here. In 1941, the HBC post closed. After the World War II in 1948, the military base was transferred to the Canadian government. And in 1955, it began operating a Mid-Canada Line radar station. Though the radar station was not operational for long and closed in 1965, it established the village permanently.

In 1961, when the Quebec Government decided to give French names to northern settlements, the name Great Whale River was replaced with Grande-Baleine which itself was replaced a year later with Poste-de-la-Baleine. On June 28, 1978, the Cree Village Municipality of Poste-de-la-Baleine was officially established. The Cree village was then officially renamed Whapmagoostui on May 8, 1996, from then on replacing all other toponyms.

In 2013, seven young men from the community journeyed 1,600 km (990 mi) for "Nishiyuu", in support of Idle No More.

== Economy ==
Whapmagoostui was founded around a Hudson's Bay Company post. The community later became the site of a military airport, now abandoned. Hunting is still an important part of the community.

== Government ==
The police services are provided by the Eeyou Eenou Police Force.

== Demographics ==
Population:

- Population in 2021: 1,022 (2016 to 2021 population change: +0.6%)
- Population in 2016: 1,016 (2011 to 2016 population change: +12.6%)
- Population in 2011: 874 (2006 to 2011 population change: +7.6%)
- Population in 2006: 812 (2001 to 2006 population change: +4.4%)
- Population in 2001: 778 (1996 to 2001 population change: +24.3%)
- Population in 1996: 626 (1991 to 1996 population change: +23.2%)
- Population in 1991: 508

== Transportation ==
The community is only accessible by air via the Kuujjuarapik Airport and, in late summer, by boat.

== Education ==
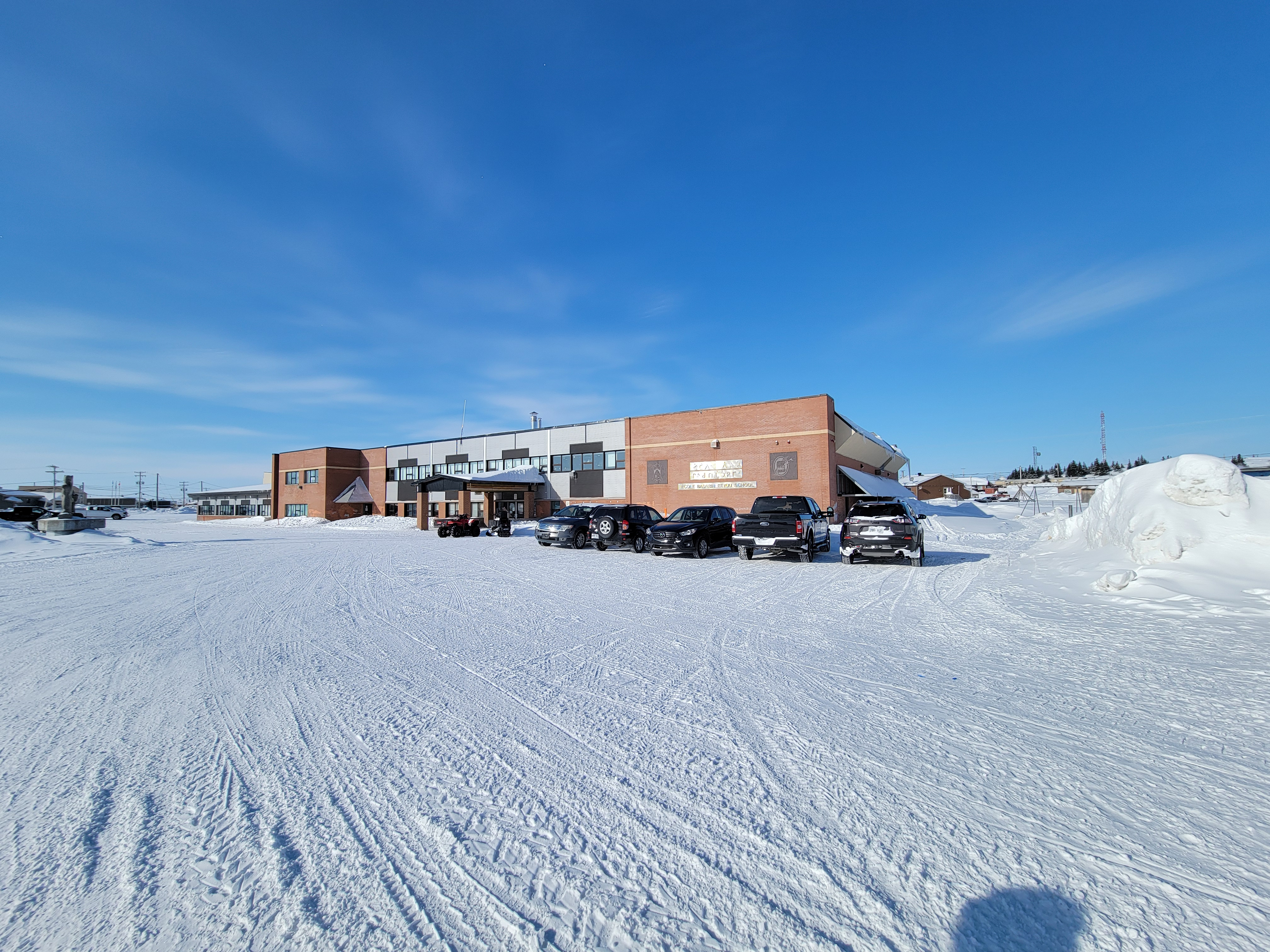
Badabin Eeyou School

The Cree School Board operates the Badabin Eeyou School (Cree: ᐹᑖᐱᓐ ᐄᔨᔨᐤ ᒋᔅᑯᑎᒫᑑᑭᒥᒄ), which includes the Meeyow Bee Nooquow School. In 1982, the school was built, and in 1989, the first high school class graduated.
