= Great Whale River =

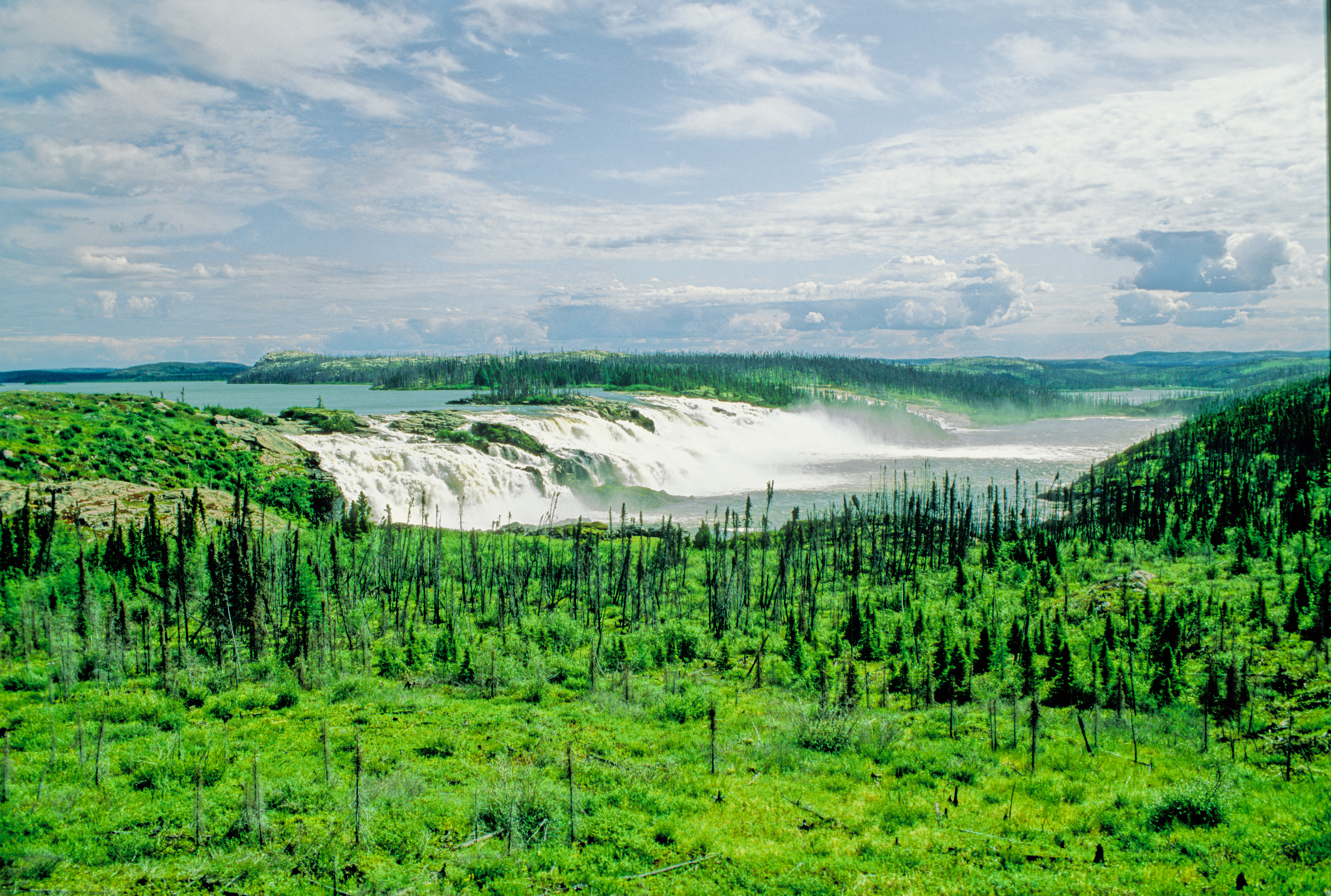
- The first step of the GB1 falls of Great Whale River, summer 1992

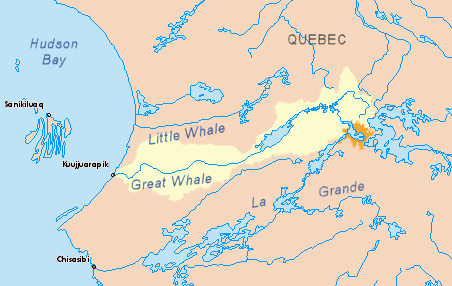
- Great Whale River basin in yellow
- Native name: Grande rivière de la Baleine (French); Abchigamiche River

Location
- Country: Canada
- Province: Quebec
- Region: Nunavik

Physical characteristics
- Source: Lake Saint-Luson
  - coordinates: 54°49′30″N 70°32′17″W
  - elevation: 500 m (1,600 ft)
- Mouth: Hudson Bay
  - location: Kuujjuarapik / Whapmagoostui
  - coordinates: 55°15′59″N 77°47′23″W
  - elevation: 0 m (0 ft)
- Length: 724 km (450 mi)
- Basin size: 42,700 km^{2} (16,500 sq mi)
- Discharge
  - average: 680 m^{3}/s (24,000 cu ft/s)

The Great Whale River (French: Grande rivière de la Baleine) is a river in Nunavik, Quebec, Canada. It flows from Lac Saint-Luson through Lac Bienville west to Hudson Bay. While the lower section of the river (after Lac Bienville) has a very powerful current, with many waterfalls (up to 15 metres (49 ft) or 20 metres (66 ft) in height) and rapids, the upper section consists of a series of lakes interconnected by steep rapids and ledges.

Great Whale River also has a branch originating from Caniapiscau Reservoir.

Both the northern village of Kuujjuarapik, whose inhabitants are mostly Inuit, and the Cree village of Whapmagoostui are situated at the mouth of the river, near the site of the former RCAF Station Great Whale River. The villages were formerly known collectively as "Great Whale River" and "Poste-de-la-Baleine."

The portion between Lake Bienville and the mouth of the Coats River has also been called Abchigamich River, but this name was dropped in 1946 by the Commission de géographie du Québec. Also, the name has often been wrongly translated into French as Rivière de la Grande Baleine (not until 1962 did the Commission de géographie du Québec officially adopt the current Grande rivière de la Baleine).

== History ==
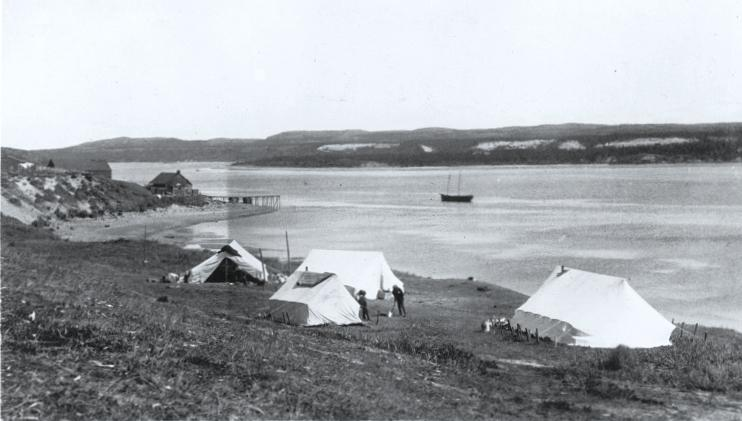
A preliminary camp on the Great Whale River of the Révillon Frères company, 1922

The Great Whale River was a place favored by the Cree and Inuit for hunting beluga long before the arrival of Europeans. Even though both were nomadic, the mouth of the river was often an encampment site and served as unofficial border.

The name of the river was recorded in 1744 in the logbooks of Hudson's Bay Company employees Thomas Mitchell and John Longland, while exploring the bay's coast. The entry for July 25 made the first mention of the "Great White Whail [sic] River". It may have come from the Cree Whapmagoostui, meaning River of the Whale, and referring to the hunting of white whale or beluga there.

In the early 1970s, the state-owned provincial power utility Hydro-Québec planned to construct three hydroelectric power stations on the Great Whale River as a part of the James Bay Project. Although detailed planning for the project was only begun in 1986, opposition from Crees, Inuit, environmental organizations like Greenpeace and the Friends of the Earth and other activists led the Premier of Quebec, Jacques Parizeau, to announce in November 1994, that the project was suspended indefinitely.

== List of lakes on the upper section ==
- Lac Saint-Luson
- Lac Girauday
- Lac Lamberville
- Lac Gournay
- Lac Prieur
- Lac Cognac
- Lac Roman
- Lac Poncy
- Lac Molleville
- Lac Chastenay
- Lac Turreau
- Lac Naudin
- Lac Raguideau
- Lac Bourgtalon
- Lac Bouvante
- Lac Novereau
- Lac Decoigne
- Lac Jacquemont
- Lac Delaroche
- Lac Sanchagrin
- Lac Danneville
- Lac Sablons
- Lac Maravat
- Lac Ducasse
- Lac Laurac
- Lac Chastenet
- Lac Magne
- Lac Maurel
- Lac Louet
- Lac Wasatimis
- Lac Bienville
- Lac Paimpoint

== Gallery ==
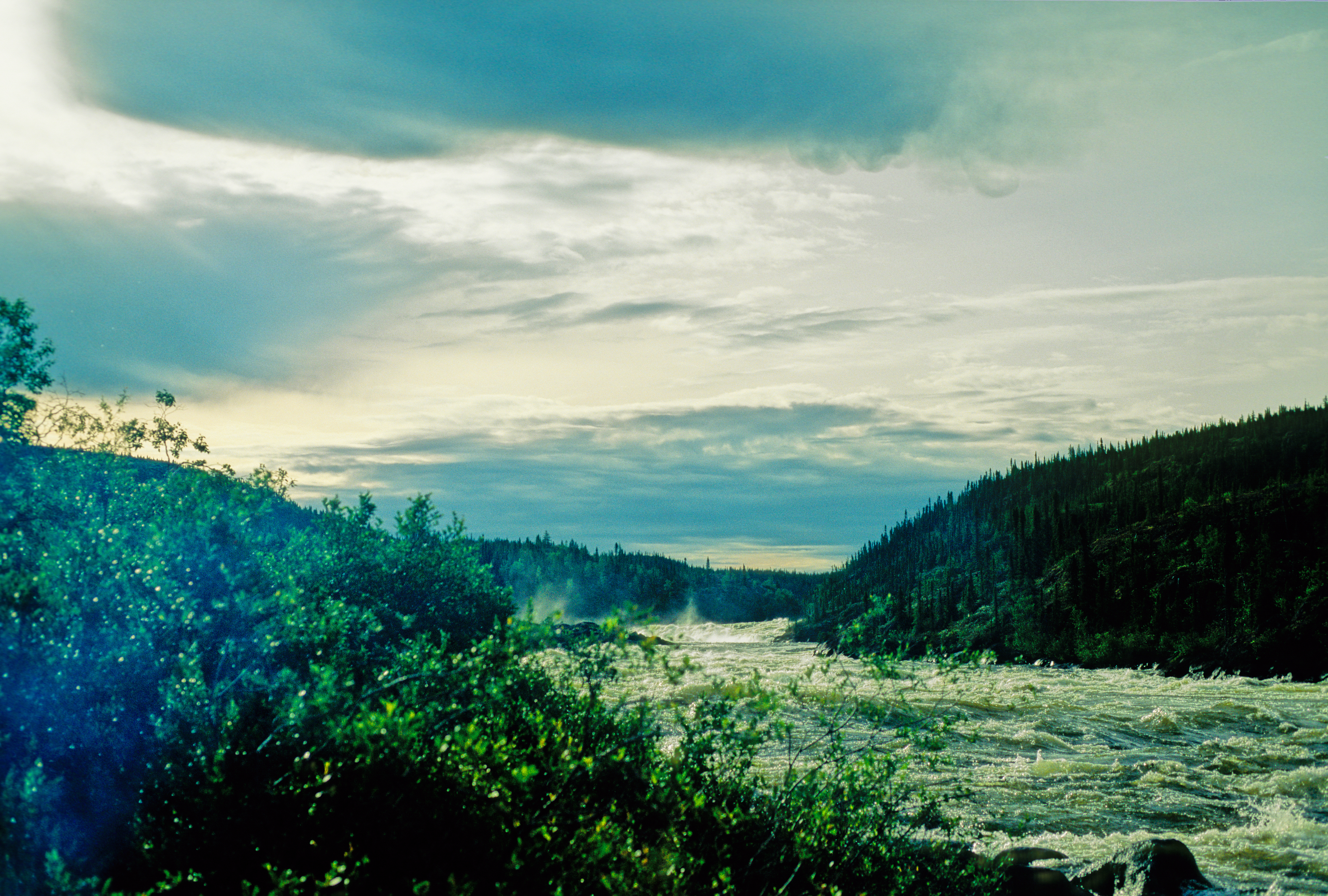

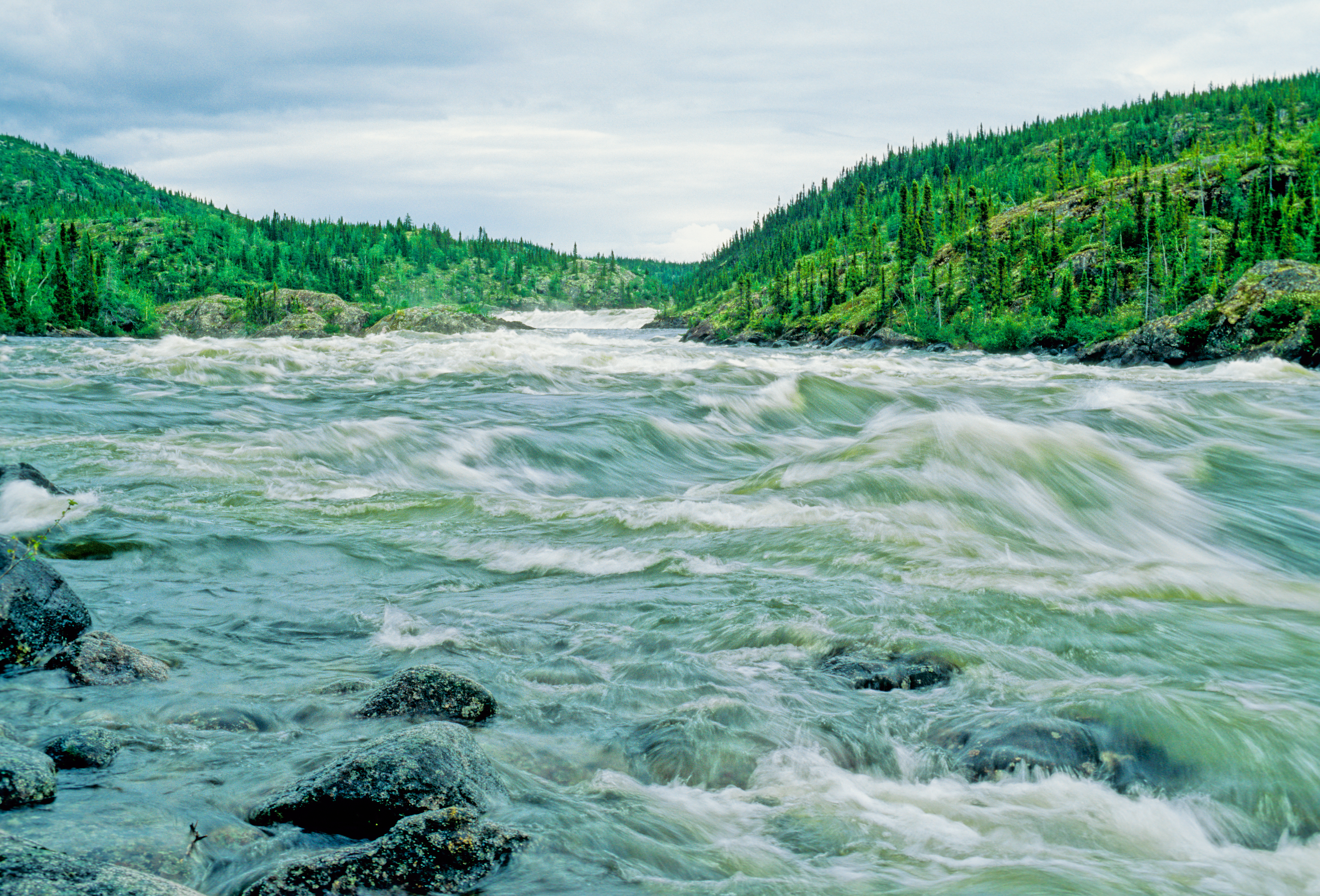

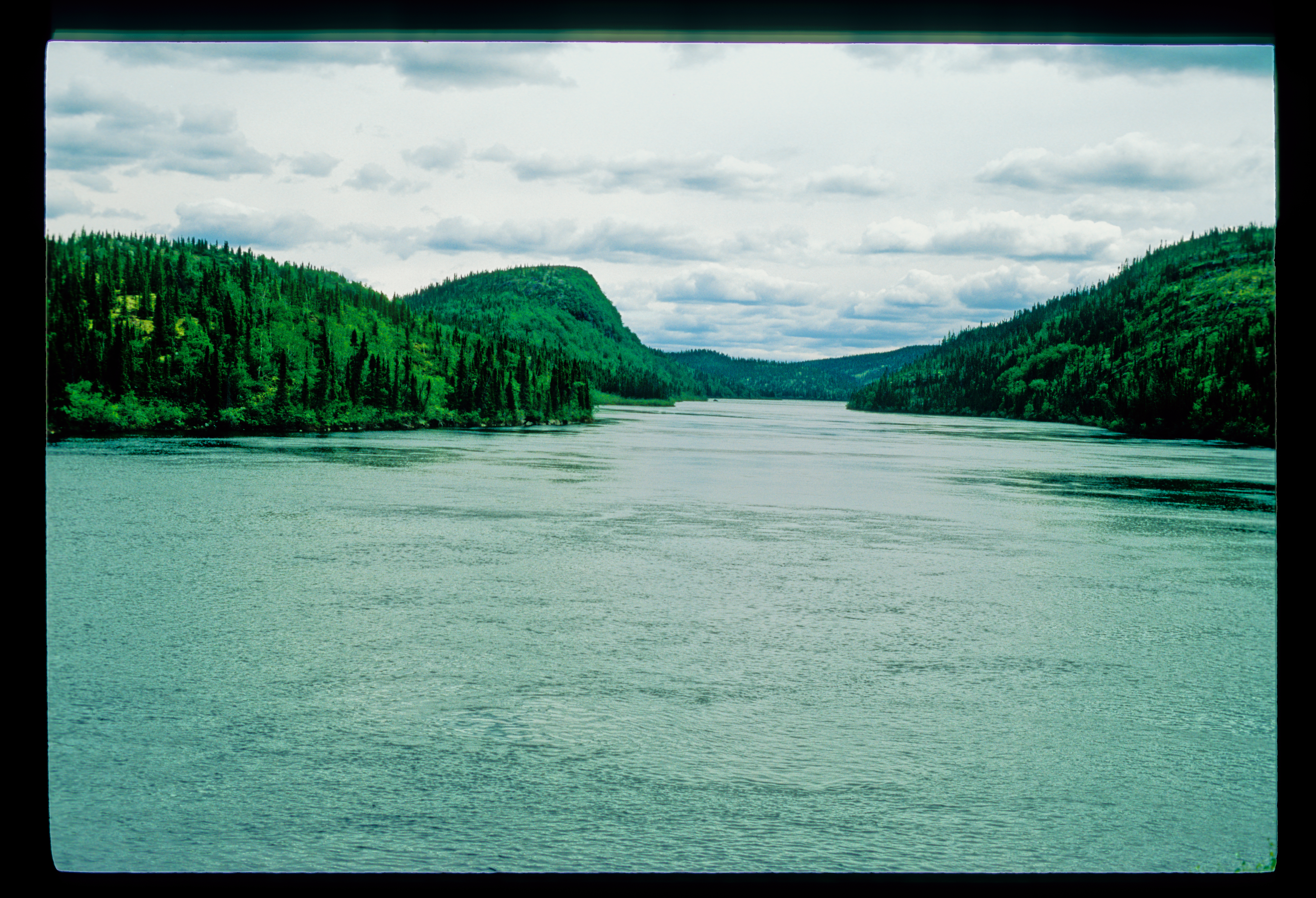

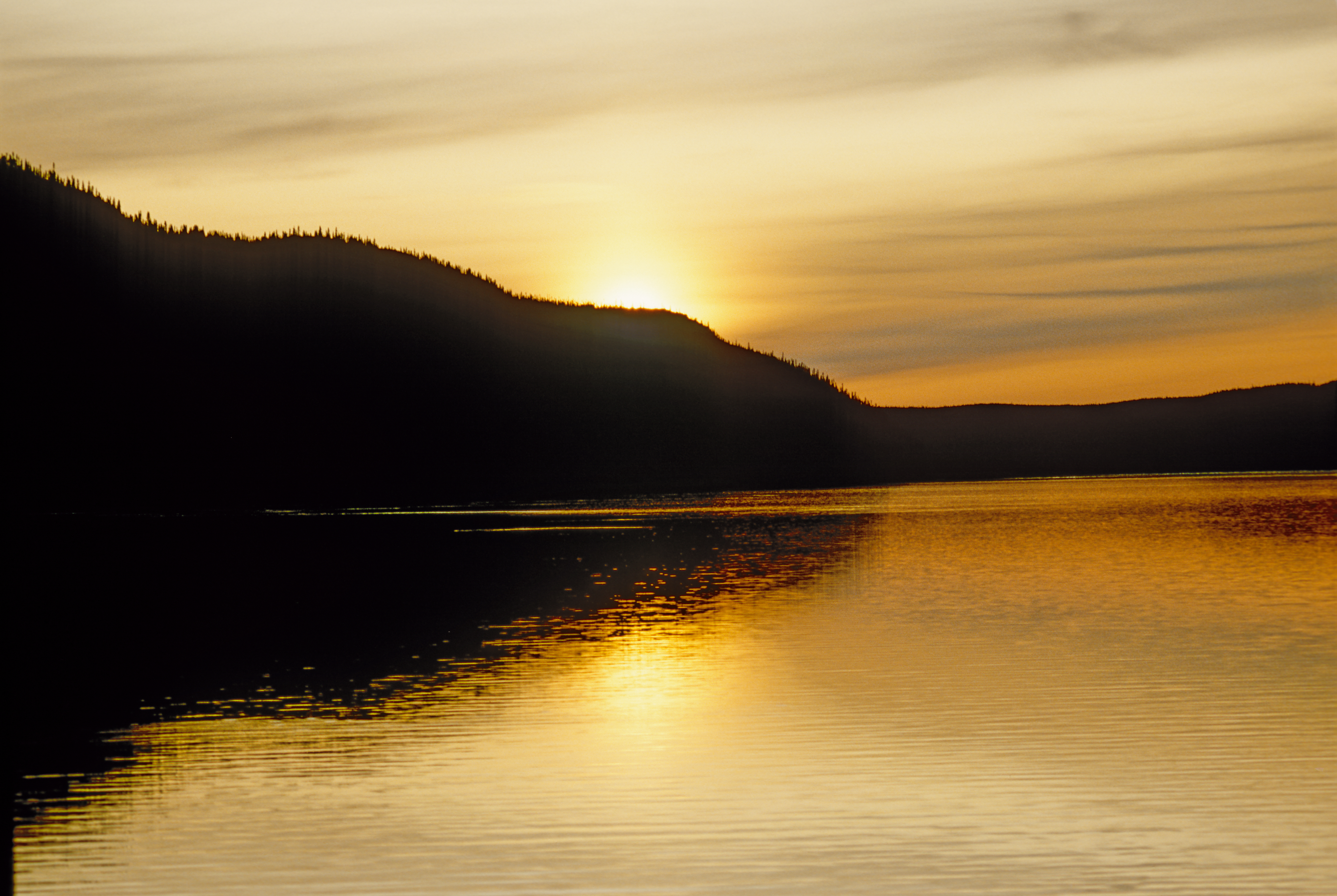

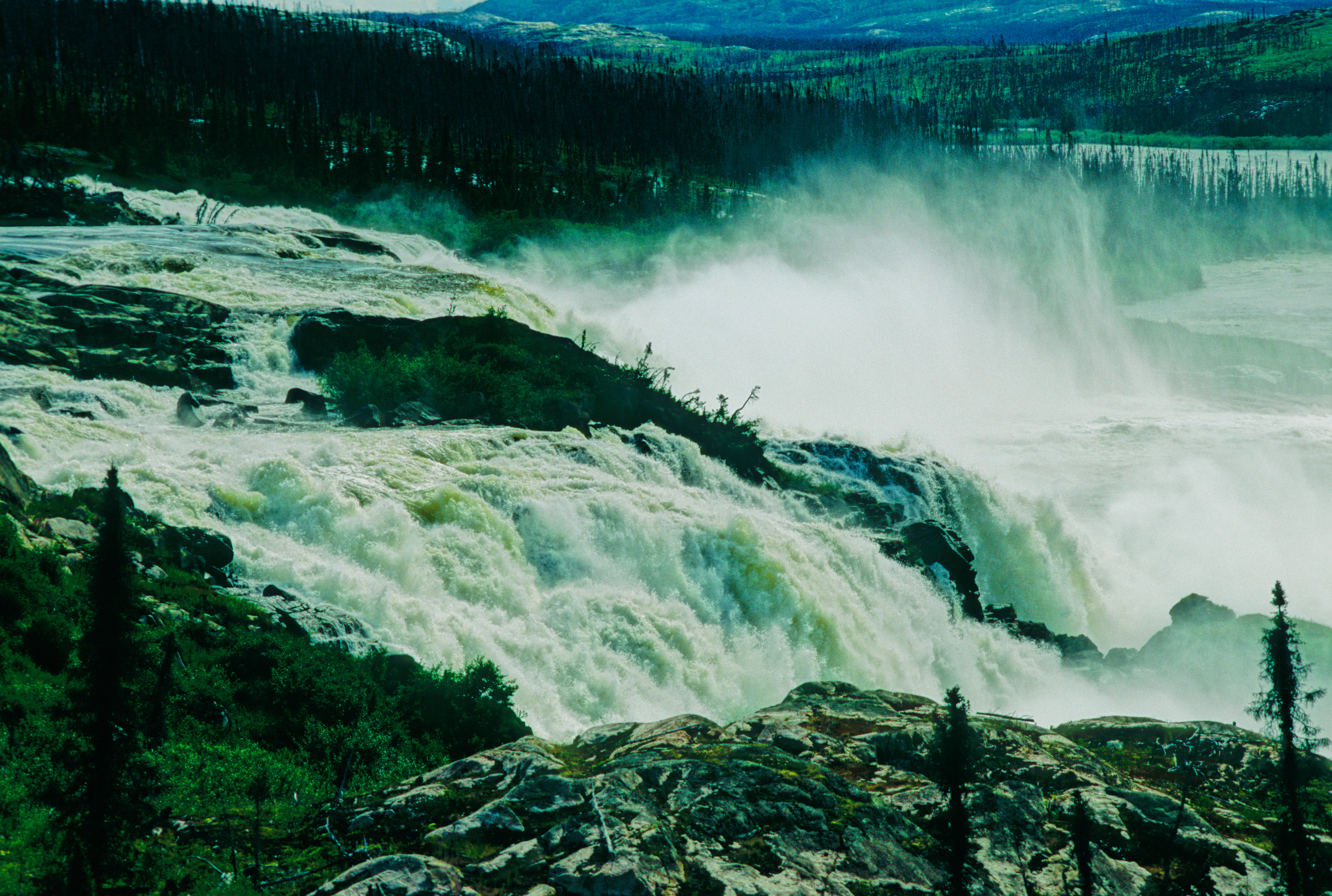

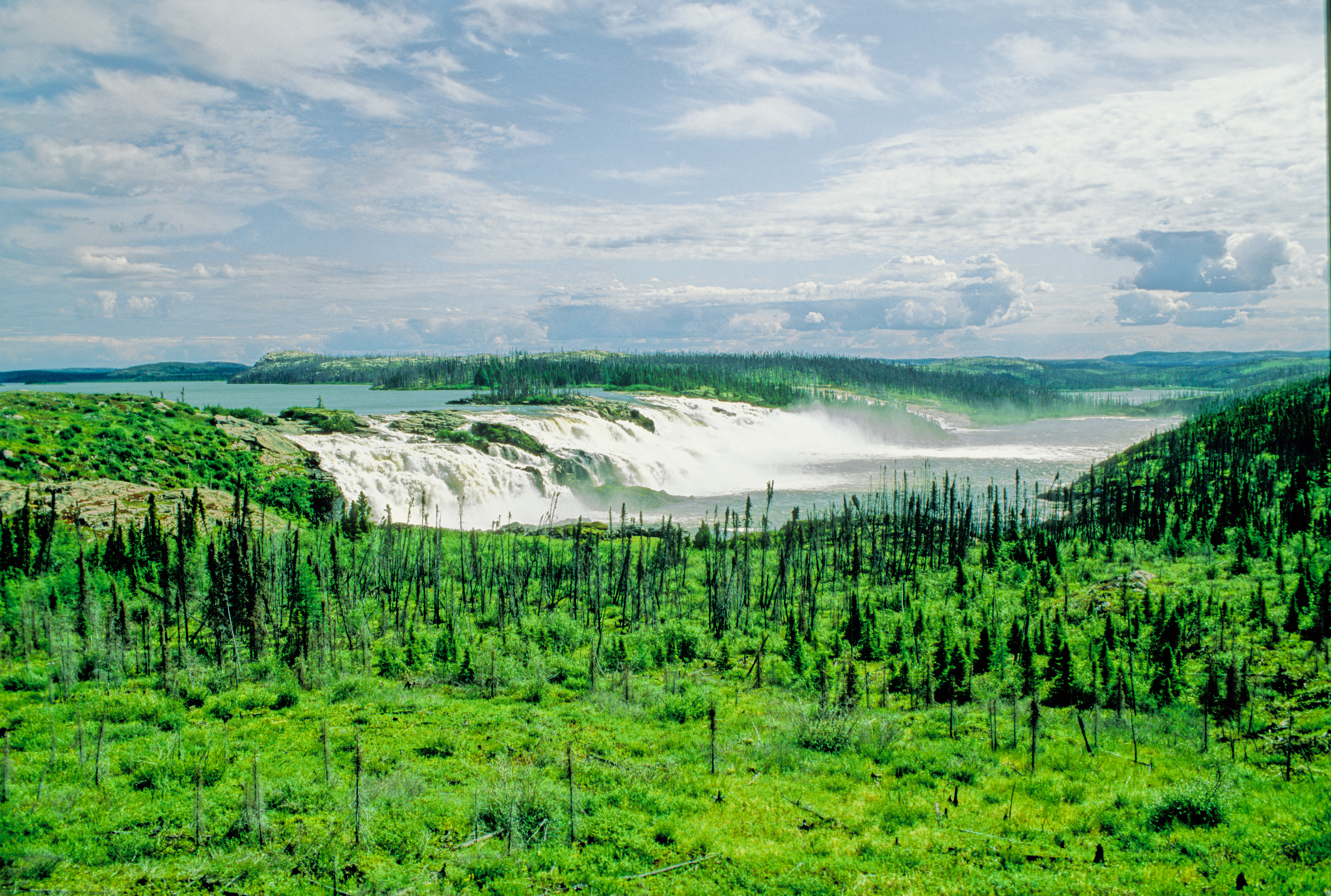

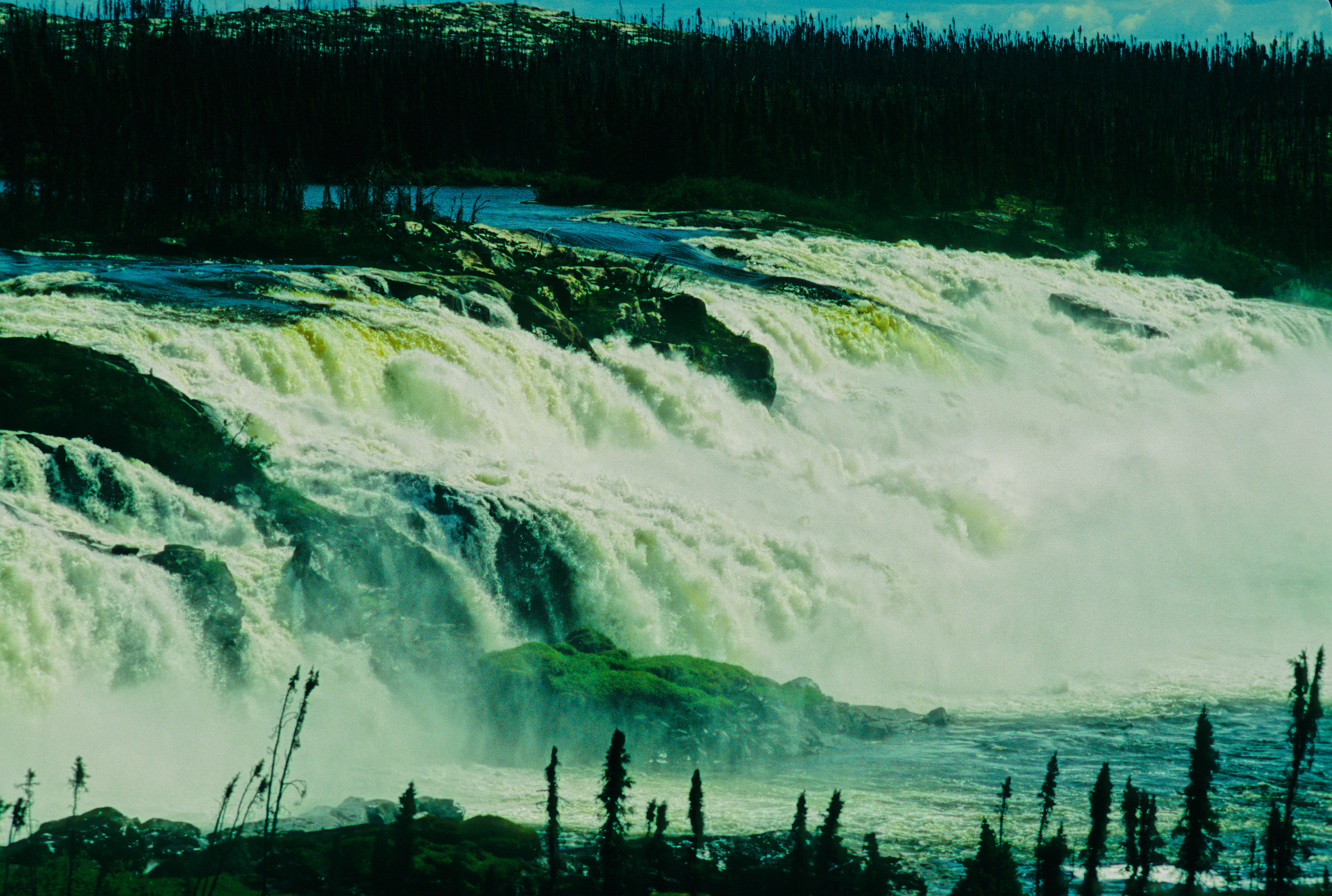

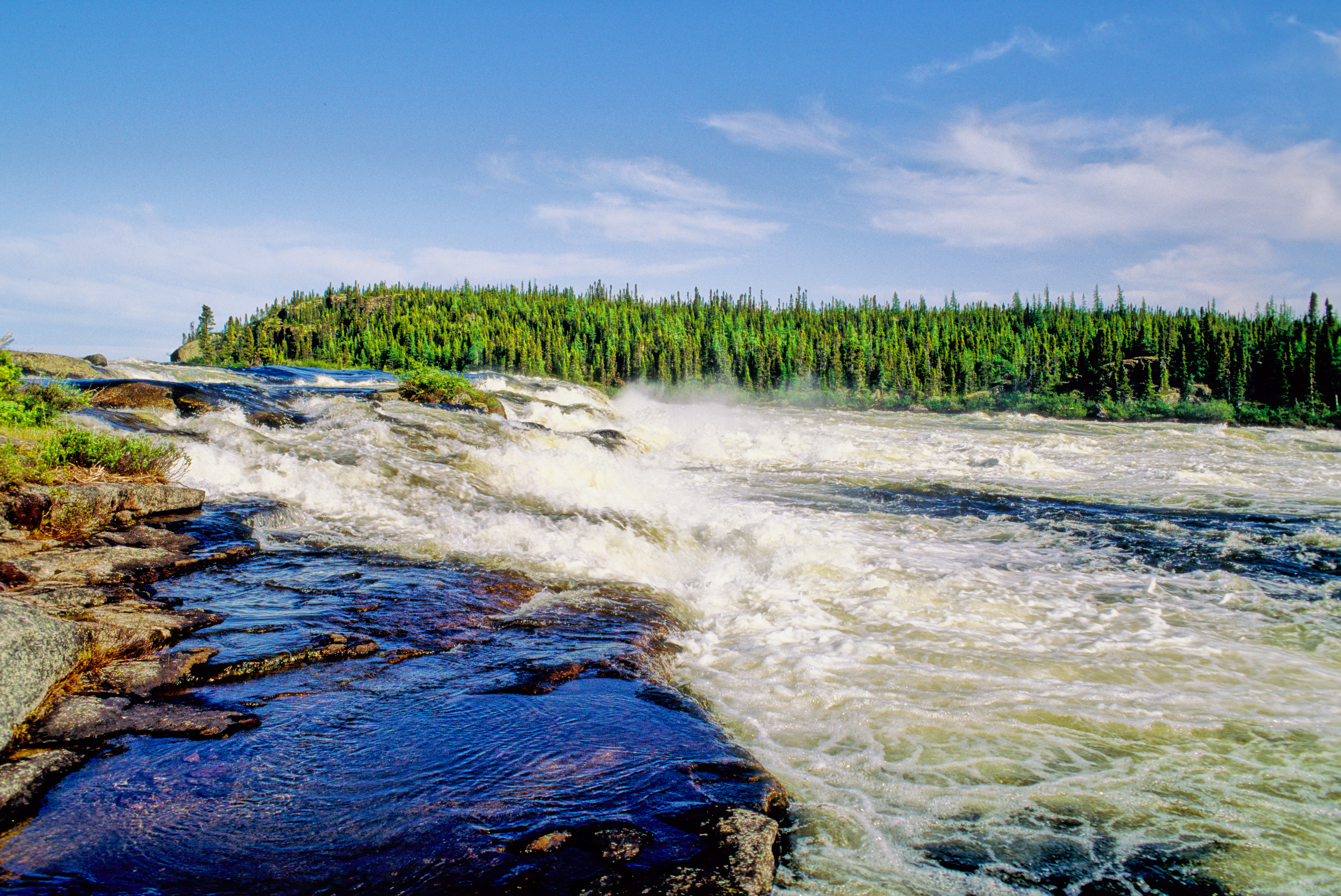

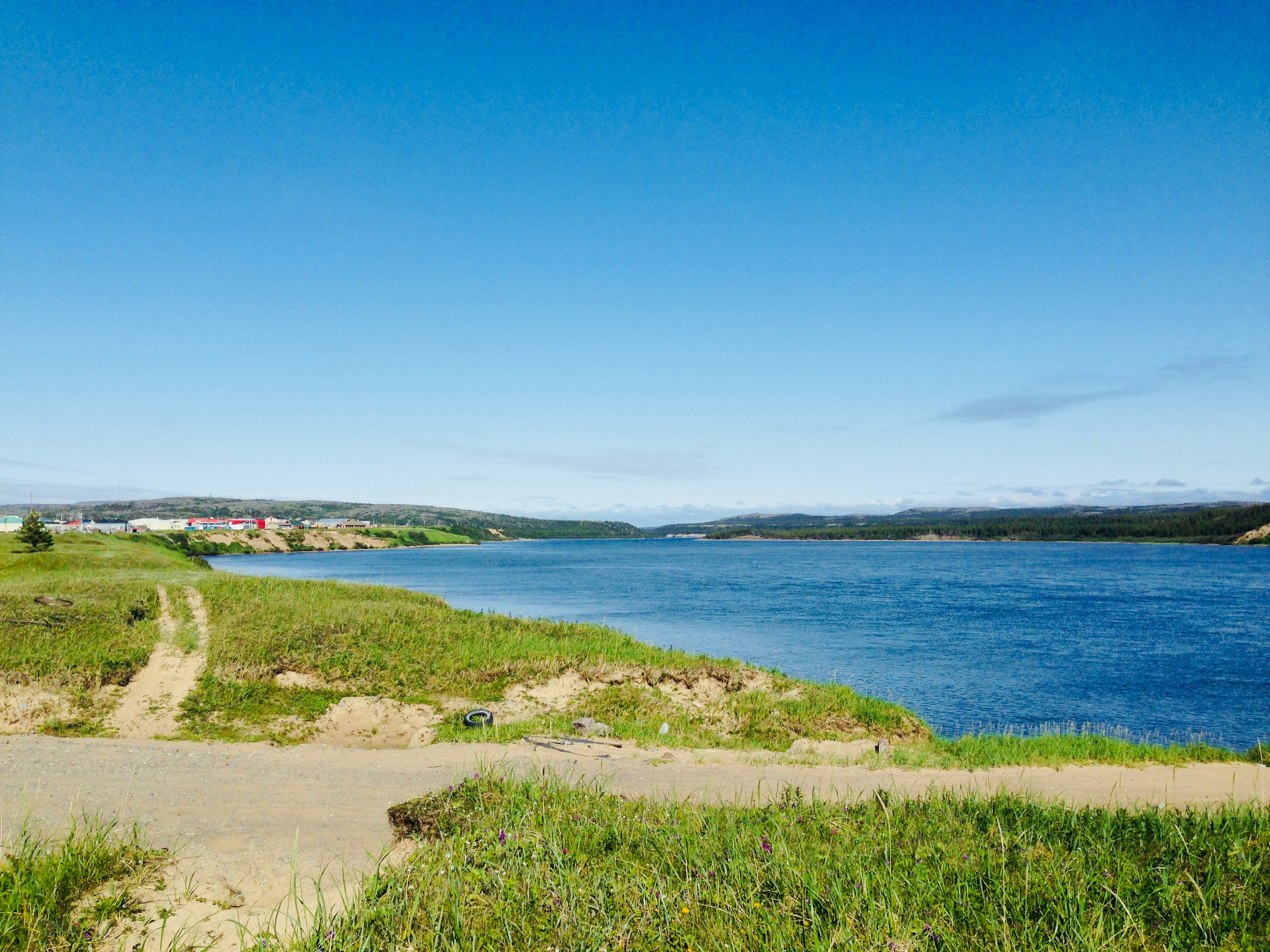

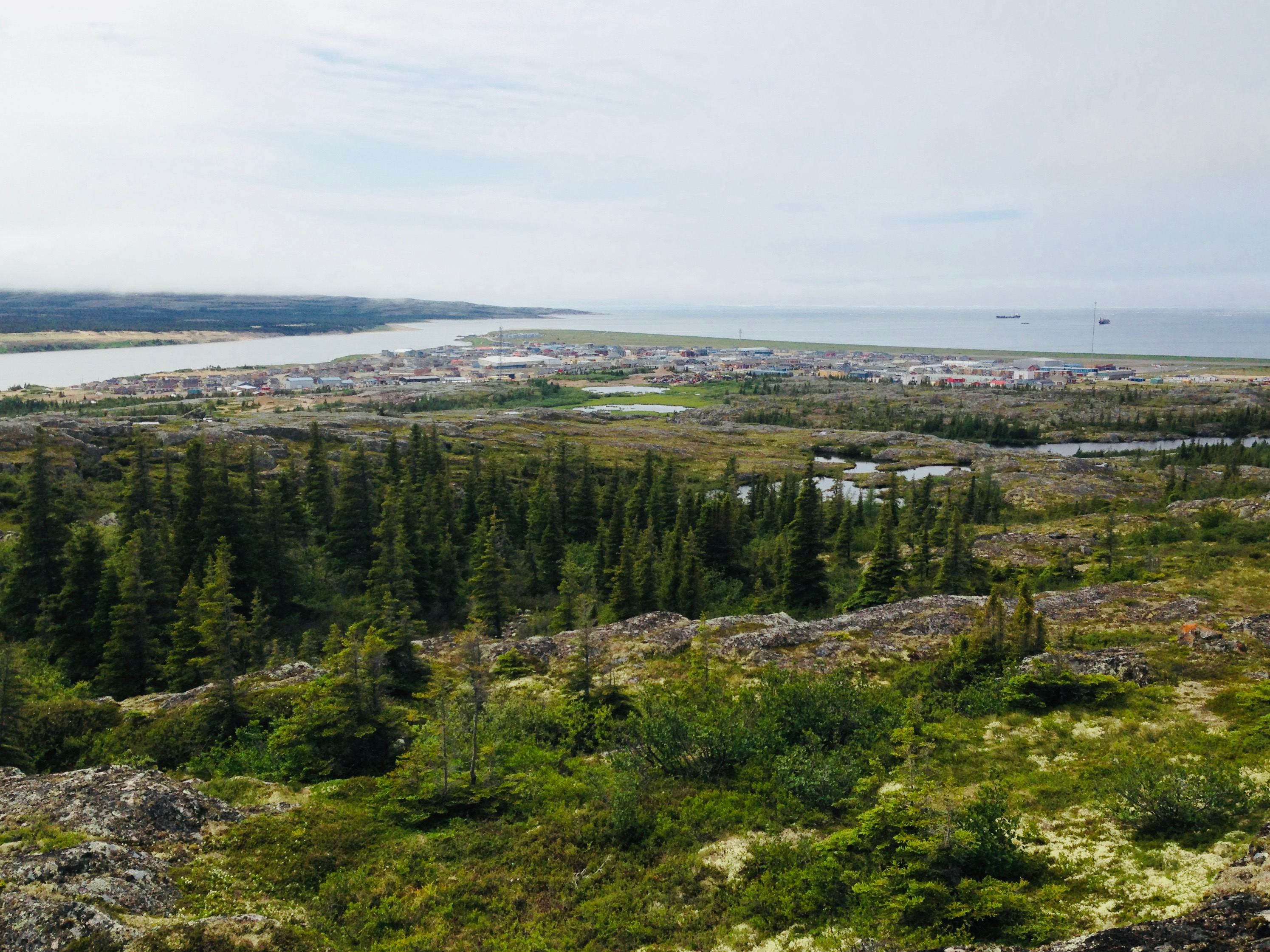

== See also ==
- List of longest rivers of Canada
- Little Whale River - running parallel to the Great Whale River about 100 km north
- List of Quebec rivers

== Sources ==
- The Great Whale Project
