= Rita Mestokosho =

Canadian Innu writer and poet (born 1966)

- Born: 1966 (age 59–60); Mingan, Quebec
- Education: University of Quebec in Chicoutimi
- Occupations: Innu writer and poet

Rita Mestokosho (born 1966 in Ekuanitshit Innu reserve in Quebec, in the Côte-Nord region) is an Innu writer and poet, councillor for culture and education in the Innu nation.

== Biography ==
=== Indigenous activist ===
Born in the small Innu village of Ekuanitshit, Mestokosho spent a great part of her childhood wandering the forest with her parents, who were hunter-gatherers. After her high school in Quebec City and then in Montreal, Rita Mestokosho began studying political science at the University of Quebec in Chicoutimi. Returning to her native community, she has participated for several years in the creation of an "Innu mitshuap uteitun", a house of Innu culture, where she still works as a coordinator.

Rita Mestokosho is an indigenous activist who fights for the recognition of the Innu-aimun language and the development of the culture and heritage of the Innu Nation. She is a member of her local Innu Council and a spokesperson for her community. She fought against the project for the construction of a Hydroelectricity dam on the Roman river.

Her poetry and activism are deeply interlinked. Michele Lacombe has argued that Mestokosho has not chosen poetry but that she thinks it is "more useful than political speeches for defending environmental causes closely allied to Innu people's traditional homelands". In the Oxford Handbook of Indigenous American Literature, Sarah Henzi argues that Mestokosho's work uses poetry to "take control".

=== Writer and poet ===
Rita Mestokosho has published poems in several international journals and regularly participates in meetings of writers of the native language, at international festivals of literature and poetry and at book fairs.

In 1995, she published her first poetry book, Eshi Uapataman Nukum. In 2010, Swedish publishing company Beijbom Books re-published this work in Innu, French and Swedish. She was quoted in a speech by J.M.G. Le Clézio before his Nobel prize acceptance on universal literature. Christophe Premat show how the issue of survivance is important in Mestokosho's work and how it relates to resilience by comparing her work with the one of Naomi Fontaine.

Another feature of Mestokosho's poetry is her use of bilingual editions. Nicolas Beauclair has analyzed her writings and describes her poetry as an "epistemic mobilization" using another language to decolonizing borders. She is also the first person writing in Innu and French according to The Routledge Companion to Transnational American Studies.

Her next book, Née de la pluie et de la terre, was published in September 2014.

She won the Governor General's Award for French-language poetry at the 2023 Governor General's Awards for Atikᵁ utei. Le cœur du caribou.

== Bibliography ==
=== Poetry ===
- Eshi uapataman Nukum : recueil de poèmes montagnais, Mashteuiatsh, Les Éditions Piekakuakami, 1995
- Eshi uapatam Nukum / Comment je perçois la vie, grand-mère (preface by J. M. G. Le Clézio), Göteborg, Beijborn Books, 2010
- Née de la pluie et de la terre, Paris, Éditions Bruno Doucey, 2014
- Atikᵁ utei. Le cœur du caribou, Montréal, Mémoire d'encrier, 2022
