= Île aux Perroquets Lighthouse =

Île aux Perroquets Lighthouse Phare de l'Île-aux-Perroquets
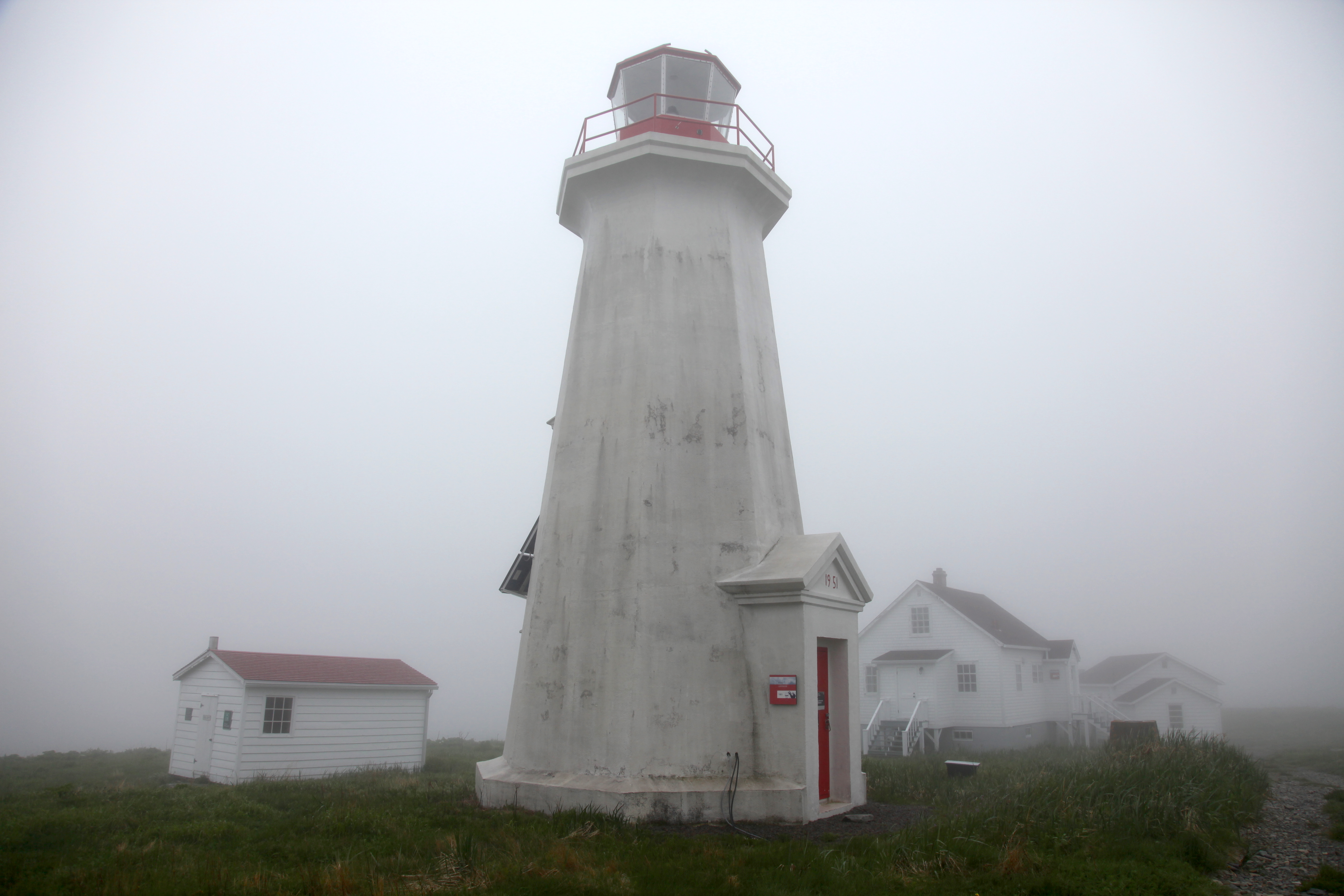
- Photo taken 19 June 2017
- Location: Île aux Perroquets, Longue-Pointe-de-Mingan, Canada
- Coordinates: 50°13′14″N 64°12′24″W

Tower
- Constructed: 1951
- Construction: concrete
- Automated: 1981
- Height: 10.5 m (34 ft)
- Shape: octagon
- Operator: Mingan Archipelago National Park Reserve
- Heritage: heritage lighthouse, part of a Quebec heritage property

Light
- Focal height: 24 m (79 ft)
- Range: 12 nmi (22 km; 14 mi)
- Characteristic: Fl W 5s
- Original lighthouse
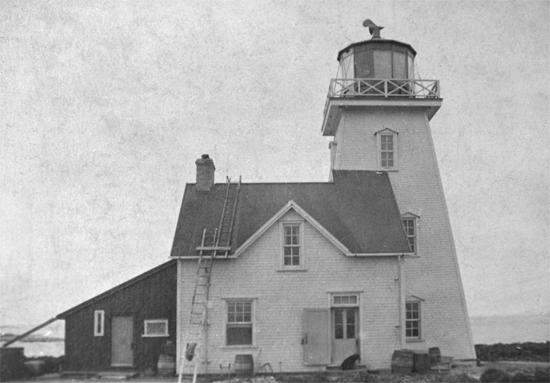
- Constructed: 1888
- Construction: iron (lantern), structural wood
- Height: 55 ft (17 m)
- Shape: square
- Markings: White (tower), red (lantern)
- Focal height: 87 ft (27 m)
- Lens: catoptric lens
- Range: 15 mi (24 km)
- Characteristic: Fl W 30s

The Île-aux-Perroquets lighthouse (French: Phare de l'Île-aux-Perroquets) is a lighthouse on the Île aux Perroquets in the Mingan Archipelago, Gulf of St. Lawrence, Quebec, Canada. It was built in 1951, replacing an 1888 wooden lighthouse. It received heritage designation in 2014.

== Location ==
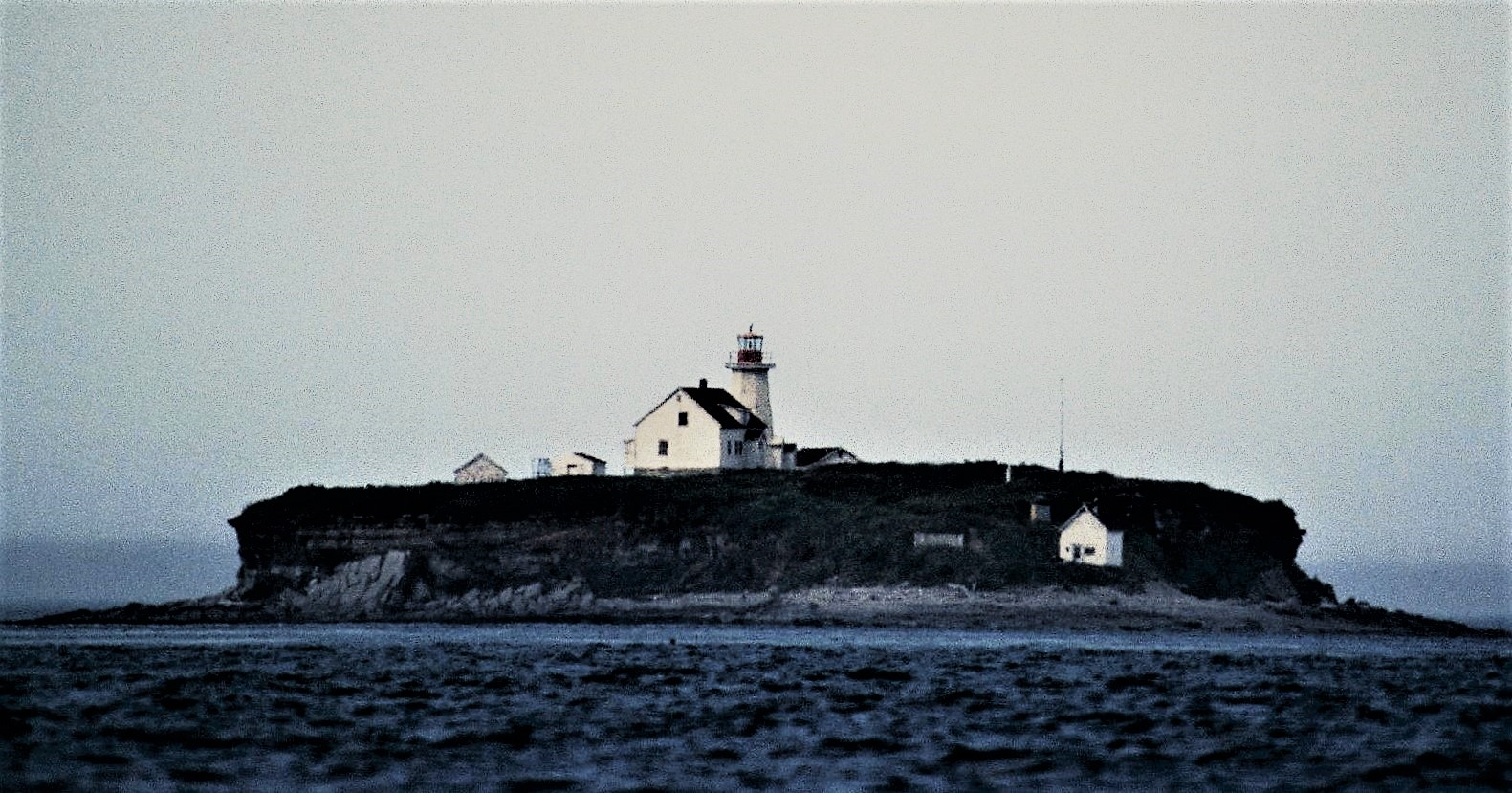
L'île aux Perroquets in 2005

The Île aux Perroquets Lighthouse is on the Île aux Perroquets, an island at the western end of the Mingan Archipelago on the north shore of the Gulf of Saint Lawrence. It is in the Mingan Archipelago National Park Reserve, and the Longue-Pointe-de-Mingan municipality. In the Innu-aimun language the island is called Utshishtunishekau, meaning "nest-shaped rock". The French name means "parrot island", and refers to the Atlantic puffin, a bird with a brightly colored beak.

The island is 350 metres (1,150 ft) long and less than 100 metres (330 ft) wide. It is a rocky plateau about 12 metres (39 ft) above sea level. It has steep cliffs, almost vertical on the east side but sloping more gently on the south side. Fauna include the Atlantic puffin (Fratercula arctica), razorbill (Alca torda), black guillemot (Cepphus grylle), black-legged kittiwake (Rissa tridactyla) and common raven (Corvus corax). These species generally nest in the island's cliffs and scree. The island is also home to the common eider (Somateria mollissima) and some species of gull.

== 1888 tower ==
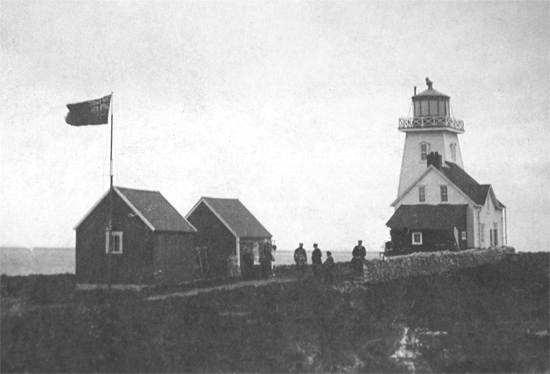
The house and lighthouse in 1898

The first lighthouse was wooden and was built in 1888. The 1888 Annual Report of the Department of Marine and Fisheries included the following information:

During the past season a lighthouse was erected on the northwesternmost of the group of four islands known as the Perroquet Islands at the western extremity of the Mingan group, on the north coast of the Gulf of St. Lawrence, and was put in operation on the 1st September. The light is revolving white and attains its greatest brilliancy every 30 seconds. It is elevated 87 feet above high water mark and should be visible 15 miles from all points of approach, excepting where intercepted by Mingan Island. The illuminating apparatus is catoptric. The building consists of a square wooden tower with dwelling attached, painted white, surmounted by an iron lantern painted red. It is 55 feet in height from the ground to the vane on the lantern. The building stands 83 feet from the northern cliff and 228 feet from the western cliff of the island. The cost of erection, including lantern and illuminating apparatus was $7,816.12.

The first keeper was Henry de Puyjalon, a French count who had moved from Brittany to Canada in 1872. He married the daughter of Gédéon Ouimet, former Quebec premier, and became the provincial Inspector-General of hunting and fishing. He accepted the position of lighthouse keeper in 1888 due to his love of the rugged beauty of the North Shore. He was succeeded by Charles-Eustache Forgues in 1891, who died in a boat accident after a year, and was succeeded by Placide Vigneau.

Placide Vigneau was the lighthouse keeper until 1912, when his son Hector succeeded him. He was the author of the Histoire or Journal de la Pointe aux Esquimaux. His work bears witness to the life of the inhabitants of Côte-Nord. In 1918 a diaphone fog alarm was installed on the island. Hector Vigneault retired in 1948 and was replaced by J. Robert Kavanagh, who served until 1976. The last keeper was John Collin (1976–1978).

== 1951 tower ==
A replacement tower was built in 1951 as part of a lighthouse modernization program after World War II, and is typical of replacement towers designed by the Department of Transport during that period. The lighthouse has a neoclassical design with an octagonal base, shaft, and capital. It is a tapered octagonal three-story tower. The tower is 10.5 metres (34 ft) high. The light has a focal plane of 24 metres (79 ft), and gives a white flash every five seconds. There is a decorative vent cover above the red octagonal fiberglass lantern. There is a triangular pediment over the main door and flat concrete hoods over the windows. The tower is painted white with red detailing.

The tower was fully automated in 1981. In 2005 Parks Canada allocated $125,000 towards the restoration of both of the Mingan Archipelago lighthouses. The Île aux Perroquets Corporation was formed in 2010 with the goal of preserving and restoring the lighthouse. Some restoration work was undertaken in 2012.

In addition to the tower, the site includes a boathouse (stage) built in 1908–1915; the houses of the senior keeper and assistant keeper, both from 1951, the 1952 chicken coop and forge building; the 1954 storage shed; and a fog alarm building from the 1950s.

The lighthouse received heritage designation in 2014, the first in Quebec, and was transferred to the Corporation de l'Île aux Perroquets. Boat tours to the lighthouse are available, and the keeper's house is available for visitors to stay overnight. The site is owned by the Canadian Coast Guard and managed by the Mingan Archipelago National Park Reserve. As of 2021, the lighthouse was still operational.

== Sources ==
- Agence Parcs Canada, "Personnages des îles", www.pc.gc.ca (in French), archived from the original on 30 April 2018
- Anderson, Kraig, Île aux Perroquets Lighthouse, Lighthousefriends.com
- "Description fonds - Bibliothèque et Archives nationales du Québec", pistard.banq.qc.ca
- "Île aux Perroquets Lighthouse", Directory of Federal Heritage Designations, Parks Canada
- Île-aux-Perroquets (PDF), Parks Canada, archived from the original (PDF) on 30 October 2021
- l'Île-aux-Perroquets (in French), Corporation de l'Île aux Perroquets
- Rowlett, Russ (2003), "Île aux Perroquets (2)", Lighthouses of Canada: Northeastern Québec (Côte-Nord)
