= Mingan River =

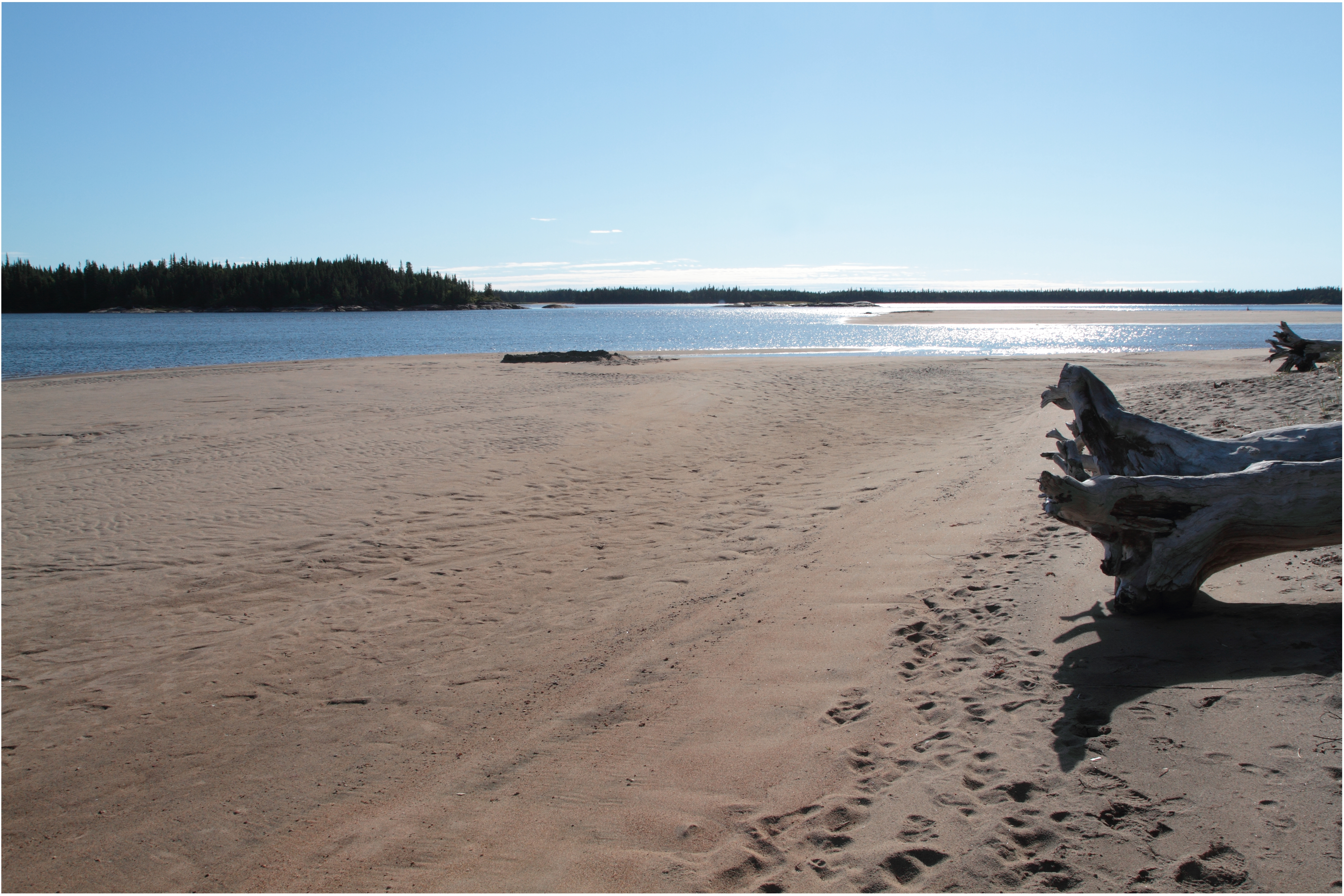
- Beach in the river's estuary

- Location within Quebec
- Native name: Ekuantshiht Hipu (Innu); Memekuauhekau Hipu (Innu)

Location
- Country: Canada
- Province: Quebec
- Region: Côte-Nord
- RCM: Minganie

Physical characteristics
- Source
  - elevation: 579 metres (1,900 ft)
- Mouth: Gulf of Saint Lawrence
  - coordinates: 50.295833°N 63.989444°W
  - elevation: 0 metres (0 ft)
- Length: 117 kilometres (73 mi)
- Basin size: 2,330 square kilometres (900 sq mi)
- Discharge
  - location: mouth
  - average: 66 cubic metres per second (2,300 cu ft/s)
  - minimum: 16 cubic metres per second (570 cu ft/s)
  - maximum: 149 cubic metres per second (5,300 cu ft/s)

Mingan River (French: Rivière Mingan) is a 117-kilometre (73 mi) salmon river of the Côte-Nord region of Quebec. It flows from north to south and empties into the Gulf of Saint Lawrence.

== Location ==
The Mingan River's source is in the Canadian Shield. It descends to sea level from an elevation of 579 m (1,900 ft) at its source, and is 117 km (73 mi) long. For most of its length it runs through a rocky (granite) valley lined with fir and spruce. Towards the end it flows between banks of sand and marble. The course of the river from its source is fairly straight, apart from two large meanders before it enters its large estuary. There are monumental falls about 9 km (5.6 mi) from its mouth, and other rapids further north.

The river is navigable from its mouth to the rapids. When the river's flow is low, salt waters from the Gulf can reach over 1 km (0.62 mi) from the mouth. The river enters the Saint Lawrence opposite the Île du Havre de Mingan. This island is at the west end of the Mingan Archipelago. The river's mouth is just east of the Mingan Indian reserve. It is in the municipality of Havre-Saint-Pierre in the Minganie Regional County Municipality. It is 12 km (7.5 mi) east of the village of Longue-Pointe-de-Mingan. A footpath runs up the river's east bank from the Quebec Route 138 bridge for 5 km (3.1 mi) to a relaxation and picnic area.

== Name ==
The local Innu people call the river Ekuantshiht Hipu or Memekuauhekau Hipu. The name Mingan is thought to be of Breton origin, meaning "white stone". The bay at its mouth was called the Grande Rade de Meigan in 1735 by the hydrographer Richard Testu de La Richardière. The navigator James Cook called it the Baye de Mingan in 1784. The river is identified on the 1775 map by John Mitchell.

== Description ==
According to the Dictionnaire des rivières et lacs de la province de Québec (1914),

This is one of the most beautiful rivers of the region. According to the surveyor C.-E. Forgues (1885) it is navigable by light canoe to the foot of the large rapid about nine miles from its mouth. Beyond this navigation is interrupted by a series of rapids. The banks, from the sea to the foot of the first falls, for about five miles, are hills of clay on which there is a layer of sand mixed with black soil. Further on, for ten miles, the banks are granite rocks. For twenty miles from its mouth the only vegetation is burnt trees and grasslands. It is an excellent river for salmon and trout. The savages visit it for hunting, and gather at Mingan when they return from hunting. This post is one of the most important of the North Shore. The Hudson's Bay Company has established a fur trading post there. Mingan harbor is also one of the best on the shore thanks to the islands that protect it against all winds. The ground is suitable for farming near the river. Potatoes, cabbages and other vegetables do very well.

== Basin ==
The basin covers 2,330 km^{2} (900 sq mi). It is elongated along a NNE/SSW axis about 110 km (68 mi) long and 20–30 km (12–19 mi) wide, although the northernmost 25 km (16 mi) is only 10 km (6.2 mi) wide. It is bordered to the west by the basin of the Saint-Jean River and on the east by the basin of the Romaine River. The river basin is in the Minganie Regional County Municipality. It is partly in the unorganized territory of Lac-Jérôme (71.1%) and partly in the municipalities of Havre-Saint-Pierre (16.5) and Longue-Pointe-de-Mingan (11.6). A small part of the basin is in the Mingan reserve (0.78%).

== Terrain ==
The bulk of the watershed is on a high plateau that is slightly inclined towards the south and is deeply incised by alluvial valleys. The highest point is 814 m (2,671 ft) above sea level. The sides of the river valleys can rise 250–350 m (820–1,150 ft) above the river and include escarpments more than 100 m (330 ft) high. The piedmont area between the inland plateau and the coastal plain is about 20 km (12 mi) wide. It contains rounded rocky hills and rises to 300 m (980 ft) of elevation. The coastal plain is 4 to 12 km (2.5 to 7.5 mi) wide and is relatively flat, with some low hills no more than 150 m (490 ft) high.

The bedrock is mainly magmatic, including an anorthositic massif and a smaller area of granitoid rocks. The bedrock on the plateau and piedmont is covered by discontinuous areas of glacial till no more than 1 m (3 ft 3 in) deep. The bedrock often shows in outcrops on the slopes and hilltops. The main valleys hold glaciofluvial sediments and some eskers. The coastal plain has large amounts of clay and silt deposited by the Goldthwait Sea after the glaciers retreated. These fine sediments were then covered by coarser sandy deltaic and estuarine sediments.

== Hydrology ==
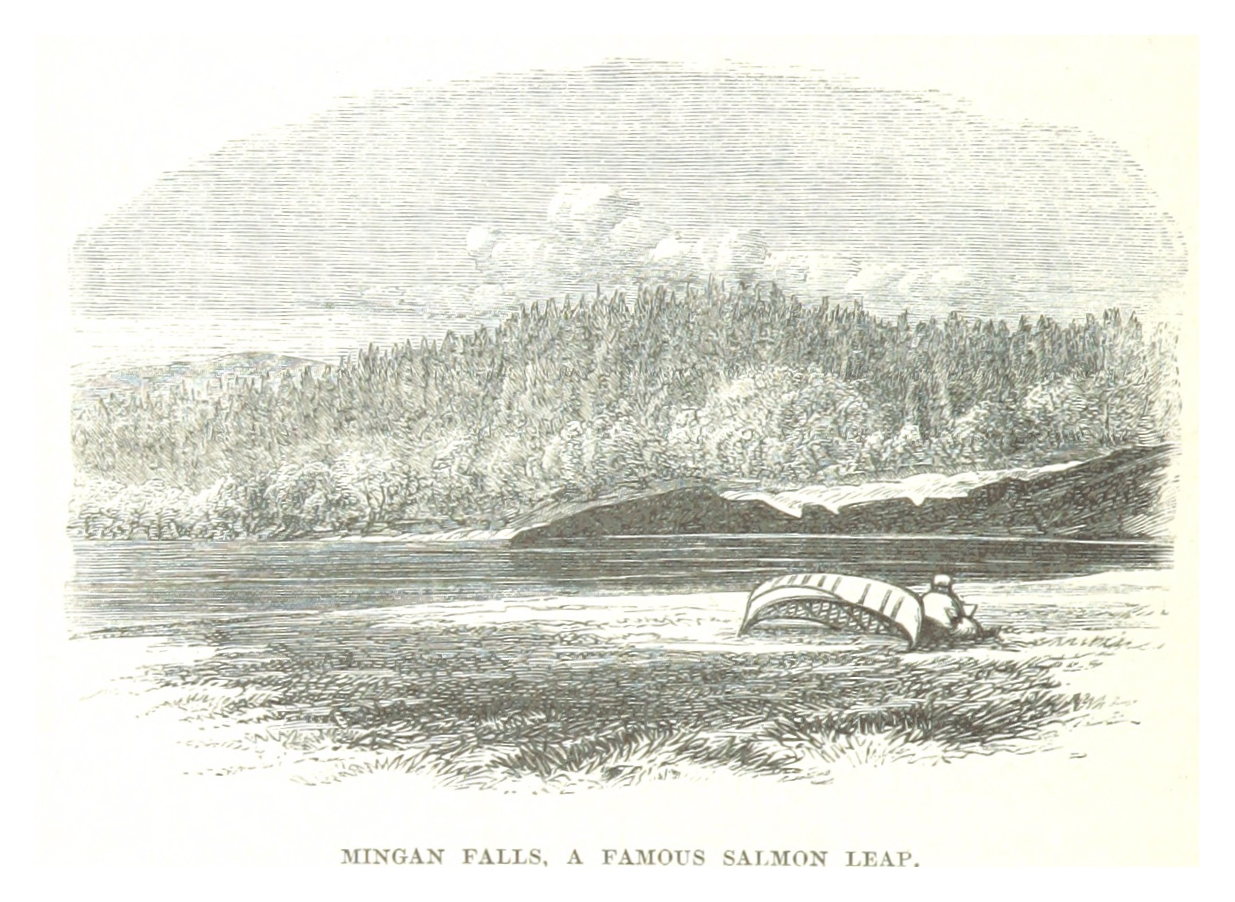
Mingan Falls c. 1863

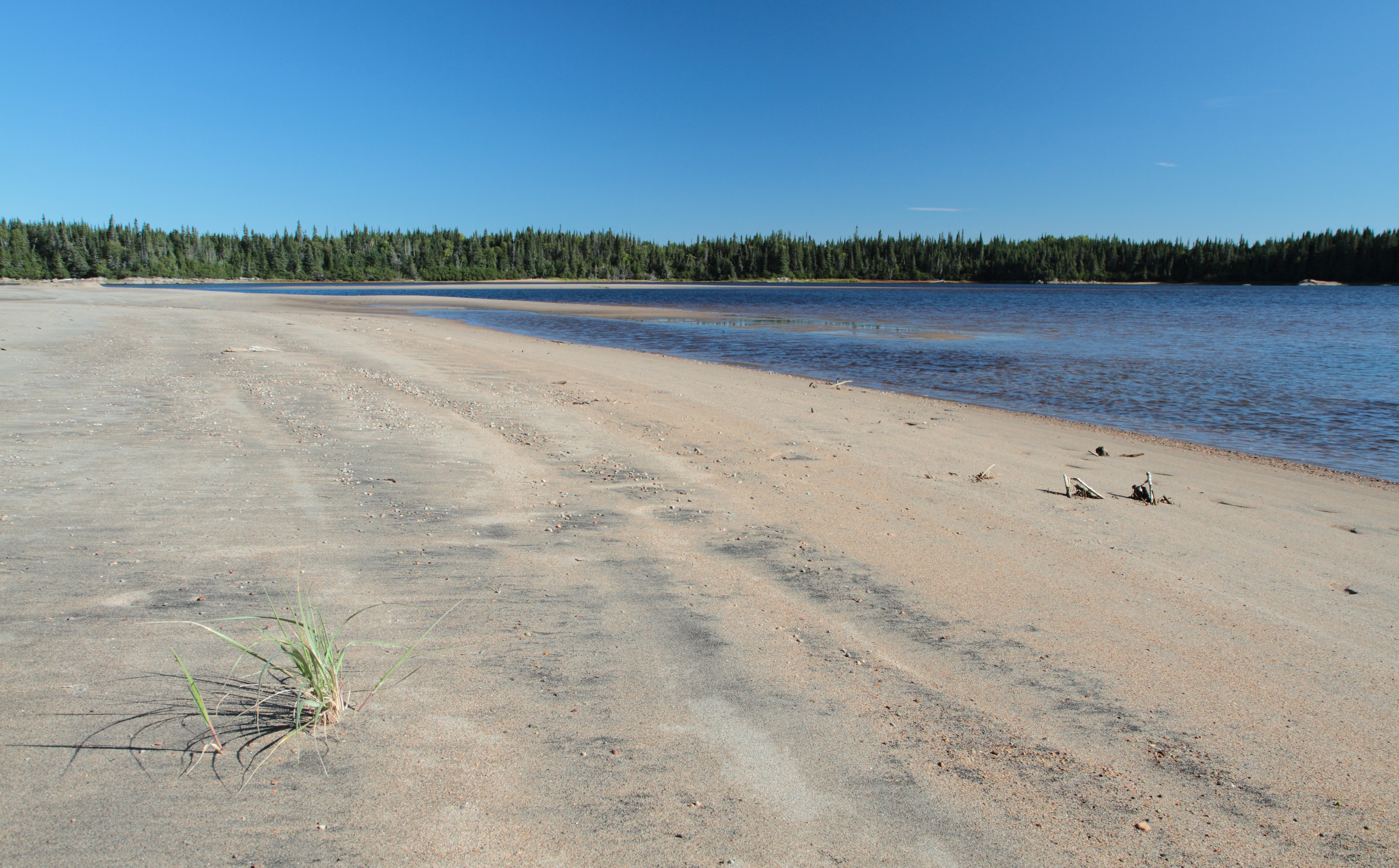
Mingan River estuary

The valleys of the streams and rivers conform to fractures in the hard bedrock, with straight-line sections intersecting at right angles. In the plateau the rivers mostly flow in straight courses through old V-shaped valleys formed in the last glacial period. The larger rivers in the center flow in more winding courses through U-shaped glacial valleys, and in places meander. In its last section the Mingan River again follows a rectilinear course cut through the loose coastal sediments, then makes two large meanders before entering the Saint Lawrence. The river has an estuary 1.8 km (1.1 mi) long with an average width of 420 m (1,380 ft). The estuary is a submerged delta with multiple channels and shoals fed by erosion from the banks of the downstream part of the river. The annual average flow at the river mouth is estimated to be 66 m^{3}/s (2,300 cu ft/s), varying during the year from 16 to 149 m^{3}/s (570 to 5,260 cu ft/s). When flow is low the salt waters can travel up the estuary 1.5 km (0.93 mi) to the Quebec Route 138 bridge.

The Mingan is fed in the north by the Mingan Northwest and Mingan Northeast rivers. Tributaries include the Mitshem Kutshieu River, which drains the center-west of the basin, and the Manitou River, which drains the southwest of the basin and joins the Mingan about 5 kilometres (3.1 mi) from its mouth. A tributary that enters the east bank drains lakes Charles, Jérôme and Kleczkowski. Waterfalls on the Mingan river include the Nakatshuan Mantu Hipis, Kakahtshekaut, Kastjekawt and Mingan Falls. The Mingan Falls are 9 km (5.6 mi) from the river's mouth. Water quality measurements in 1981-1985 at the Route 138 bridge showed the water was acidic but quality was satisfactory, the main problem being turbidity.

The connected lakes André and Charles in the north of the basin cover 5.93 km^{2} (2.29 sq mi), Lake Kleczkowski in the northwest covers 9.16 km^{2} (3.54 sq mi), Lake Cugnet in the center-south covers 3.8 km^{2} (1.5 sq mi), the connected lakes Manitou, Gros Diable and Petit Diable in the south cover 29.2 km^{2} (11.3 sq mi) and Lake Patterson in the south covers 3.39 km (2.11 mi). Water bodies cover 8.73% of the watershed in total. Wetlands cover 1.81% of the watershed and are mainly ombrotrophic peatlands in the coastal plain. There are few wetlands in plateau or piedmont, which have few flat areas suitable for their formation. However, there is a 2 km^{2} (0.77 sq mi) peat bog about 10 km (6.2 mi) north of the confluence of the Mingan Northwest River.

== Environment ==
The Rivière-Saint-Jean weather station, 23 km (14 mi) from the mouth of the river, reports an annual average temperature of 1.4 °C (34.5 °F) and annual average rainfall of 1,094 mm (43.1 in). A map of the ecological regions of Quebec shows the river in sub-regions 6j-T and 6m-T of the east spruce/moss subdomain. Forests are dominated by black spruce (Picea mariana) and balsam fir (Abies balsamea), with a greater ratio of spruce to fir further north. Other tree species include white spruce (Picea glauca), jack pine (Pinus banksiana), paper birch (Betula papyrifera) and trembling aspen (Populus tremuloides). The forest is generally mature and virgin, with few fires and little forestry in recent decades, but there was a large infestation of hemlock looper moths (Lambdina fiscellaria) in the late 1980s, 1990s and early 2000s that caused considerable defoliation of the fir trees in the center of the basin. There are three waterfowl conservation areas with IUCN category VI along the south of the watershed: the Mingan West Beach, Mingan River Beach and Île du Havre de Mingan.

== Fish ==
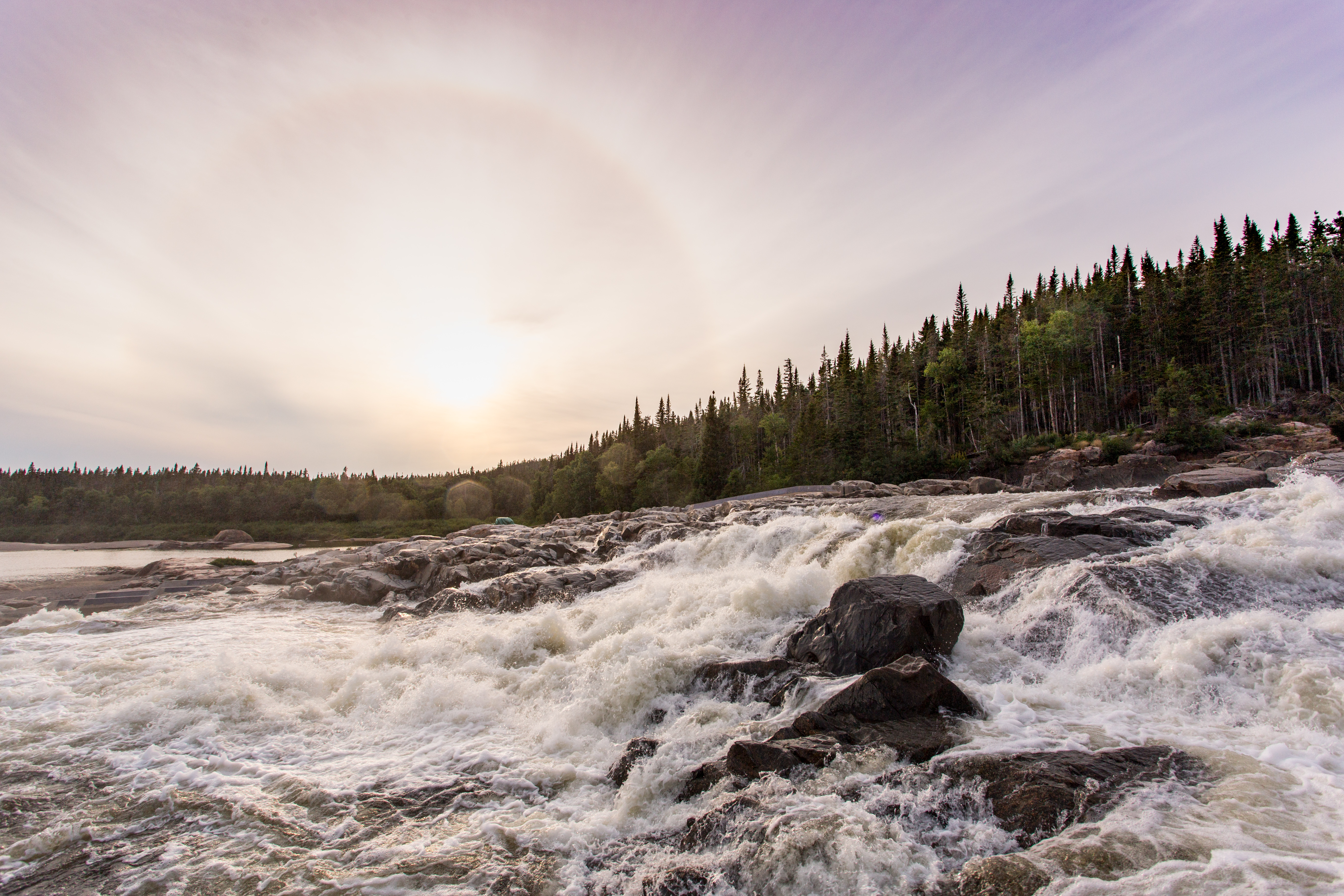
Mingan River near the community of Ekuanitshit

Innu have long used the territory for hunting and fishing, and Europeans have been fishing for salmon since the start of the 19th century. The Pourvoirie du Lac Allard et Rivière Mingan, which does not have exclusive rights, manages fishing on part of the river.

The river is known for Atlantic salmon (Salmo salar), and also has rainbow smelt (Osmerus mordax), brook trout (Salvelinus fontinalis), Atlantic sturgeon (Acipenser oxyrinchus oxyrinchus), northern pike (Esox lucius), lake whitefish (Coregonus clupeaformis) and brown trout (Salmo trutta). Other species include round whitefish (Prosopium cylinraceum), lake trout (Salveninus namaycush), burbot (Lota lota), alewife (Alosa pseudoharengus), American shad (Alosa sapidissima), Atlantic tomcod (Microgadus tomcod) and American eel (Anguilla rostrata).

The number of salmon caught in the river declined during the early 2000s, indicating a declining population. In November 2015 it was reported that the North Shore Atlantic Salmon Habitat Enhancement Program was contributing CDN$565,000 to the Ekuanitshit Innu Council and the Manitou-Mingan Outfitters for work to give the salmon easier access to spawning sites upstream from the falls, which the salmon struggle to mount. The first phase had been started, and included a series of 14 connected basins as well as a flow control channel. After completion the river above the first falls would provide 84% of the salmon potential in the river basin along 69 kilometres (43 mi) of the river.

== Sources ==
- Baie de Mingan (in French), Commission de toponymie du Québec
- Mingan (Ekuanitshit) (in French), Tourisme Côte-Nord
- Portrait du bassin versant Mingan (PDF) (in French), OBV Duplessis
- Portrait préliminaire de la zone de gestion intégrée de l'eau par bassin versant Duplessis (PDF) (in French), OBV Duplessis, April 2015
- Rivière Mingan (in French), Commission de toponymie du Québec
- Rivière Mingan (in French), Ressources naturelles Canada
- Rivière Mingan (in French), Saumon Québec
- Rivière Mingan : un canal de contournement pour protéger le saumon (in French), Radio-Canada, 27 November 2015
- Rouillard, Eugène (1914), "Mingan, (Rivière)", Dictionnaire des rivières et lacs de la province de Québec (in French), Québec. Département des terres et forêts
- Saucier, J.-P.; Robitaille, A.; Grondin, P.; Bergeron, J.-F.; Gosselin, J. (2011), Les régions écologiques du Québec méridional (PDF) (map), 4 (in French), Ministère des Ressources naturelles et de la Faune
