= Île à Bouleaux de Terre =

Island in Quebec, Canada

- Location within Côte-Nord region, Quebec

Geography
- Location: Gulf of St. Lawrence
- Coordinates: 50.24204°N 64.00286°W
- Archipelago: Mingan Archipelago
- Area: 1.94 km^{2} (0.75 sq mi)

Administration
- Canada
- Province: Québec

Additional information
- Time zone: EST (UTC-5)
  - Summer (DST): EDT (UTC-4)

Île à Bouleaux de Terre (French pronunciation: [il a bulo də tɛʁ], "Inner Birch Island"; Innu: Kaitshekauashkueiau) is an island in Canada. It is located in the province of Québec, in the east, 1,000 km northeast of the capital city, Ottawa.

== Geography ==
The area is 1.9 square kilometers. The island lies in the Mingan Archipelago National Park. The terrain on Île à Bouleaux is flat. The island's highest point is 46 meters above sea-level. It extends 1.6 kilometers from north to south, and 2.0 kilometers from east to west.

== Climate ==
The region has a continental climate. The Annual average temperature in the region is 0 °C. The warmest month is August, with an average temperature of 12 °C, and the coldest is February, with −14 °C.

Île à Bouleaux de Terre

Climate chart (precipitation, max. and min. temperature)
J	F	M	A	M	J	J	A	S	O	N	D
0 −7 −13	0 −12 −16	0 −5 −10	0 0 −6	0 5 0	0 11 5	0 13 10	0 13 12	0 11 8	0 5 3	0 0 −4	0 −3 −8
- █ Average max. and min. temperatures in °C
- █ Precipitation totals in mm
Imperial conversion
J	F	M	A	M	J	J	A	S	O	N	D
0 19 9	0 10 3	0 23 14	0 32 21	0 41 32	0 52 41	0 55 50	0 55 54	0 52 46	0 41 37	0 32 25	0 27 18
- █ Average max. and min. temperatures in °F
- █ Precipitation totals in inches
