= Henry de Puyjalon =

Canadian scientist and explorer

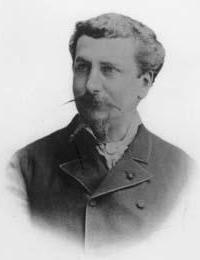
Henry de Puyjalon

Henry de Puyjalon (15 March 1841, in Floirac, Lot, France – 18 August 1905, in l'île à la Chasse, Mingan Archipelago National Park Reserve was a late 19th-century scientist and explorer. He explored the north coast of the St Lawrence River, and was one of the first Canadian ecologists to suggest wildlife and marine protected areas.

Puyjalon graduated with a Bachelor of Science degree from the University of Toulouse and emigrated to Quebec in 1874. He became a hunter, trapper, ornithologist, geologist and naturalist, and in 1880, a Quebec government employee with the task to explore mineral wealth within Labrador. He became a Canadian citizen in 1888, and for the next three years the lighthouse keeper of Parrot Island on the Mingan Archipelago.

In 1897 Puyjalon was appointed Quebec's Inspector General of Fisheries and Wildlife, and used this position to encourage the government to establish protected marine areas and to publicise the dangers of over-exploitation, particularly through his books and technical literature.

In 1900, Puyjalon publish in French: Natural history for the use of Canadian hunters and breeders of fur-bearing animals, printed by the “Soleil” Printing Company, 428 p.

The political opinions of Henry de Puyjalon are unknown, but he was friends with members of the Institut canadien de Montréal thus, Henry would have been very close to the Parti Rouge.

An episode of the television series A Scattering of Seeds featured Puyjalon.

== Family ==
In 1882, Henry wed Angelina Ouimet in Québec City; together they had 2 sons.

== Bibliography ==
- Le Petit guide du chercheur de minéraux (1892)___(Rough English translation) The little guide of mineral hunter
- Le Guide du chasseur de pelleterie (1893________(Rough English translation) The guide for the pelts dressing hunter
- Labrador et géographie (1893)________________(Rough English translation) Labrador (North Est Quebec for Him) and Geography
- Récits du Labrador (1894)__________(Rough English translation) Popular tales of Labrador ( N.E.Q. for Him)
- Histoire naturelle (1900)______________________(Rough English translation) Natural History
