= Mingan =

Mingan Ekuanitshit
- First Nations reserve
- Location in Côte-Nord region of Quebec
- Coordinates: 50°18′N 64°02′W
- Country: Canada
- Province: Quebec
- Region: Côte-Nord
- Regional county: none
- Formed: 1963

Government
  - Chief: Jean-Charles Piétacho
  - Federal riding: Côte-Nord—Kawawachikamach—Nitassinan
  - Prov. riding: Duplessis

Area
  - Total: 38.38 km^{2} (14.82 sq mi)
  - Land: 17.24 km^{2} (6.66 sq mi)

Population (2021)
  - Total: 552
  - Density: 32/km^{2} (83/sq mi)
- Time zone: UTC-5 (EST)
  - Summer (DST): UTC-4 (EDT)
- Postal Code: G0G 2A0
- Area codes: 418 and 581

Mingan, also known as Ekuanitshit in Innu-aimun, is an Innu First Nations reserve, at the mouth of the Mingan River, on Mingan Bay, on the North shore of the Gulf of St. Lawrence. It belongs to the Innu band of Ekuanitshit, geographically it is within Cote-Nord region, Minganie Regional County Municipality (administratively not part of it), Quebec, Canada.

== Geography ==
The reserve is accessible via Quebec Route 138, 10 kilometers (6.2 mi) east of the village of Longue-Pointe-de-Mingan and 36 kilometers (22 mi) west of downtown Havre-Saint-Pierre. It is serviced by a health centre, community radio station, library, cultural centre, community store, municipal water and sewer system, fire station, and an aboriginal police force.

The name Mingan, already appearing as mican on a map of 1631, is generally considered to originate from the Innu word maikan, meaning "timber wolf". But there is no certainty over this interpretation. It has also been proposed that it may have come from the Basque word mingain meaning "language", or the Breton term menguen that translates as "white stone".

== History ==
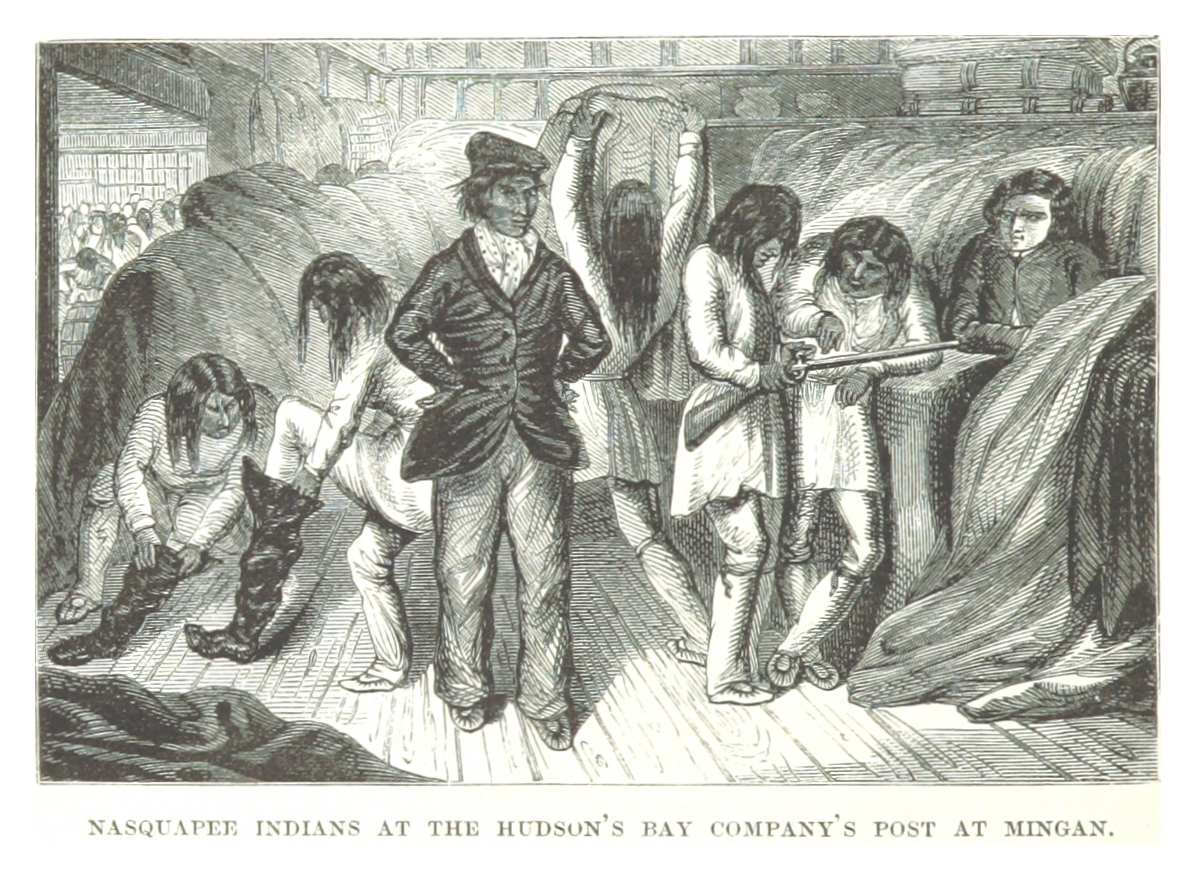
Naskapi Aboriginal people at the Hudson Bay's Post at Mingan, 1862

Historically, the region was the homeland of the Innu people, who came there from their inland hunting grounds to spend the summer on the coast. Mingan was a summer gathering site where the Innu would fish for salmon, hunt for whale, have family meetings, and trade with each other. In 1661 the Mingan Seignory was granted and Europeans began to settle in the area, marking the beginnings of the fur trade, which continued until the early 20th century. The North West Company and then the Hudson's Bay Company (from 1807 to 1873) maintained trading posts there under the name Mingan, which were frequently visited by Innu to trade furs, although they continued to stay there during the summers only.

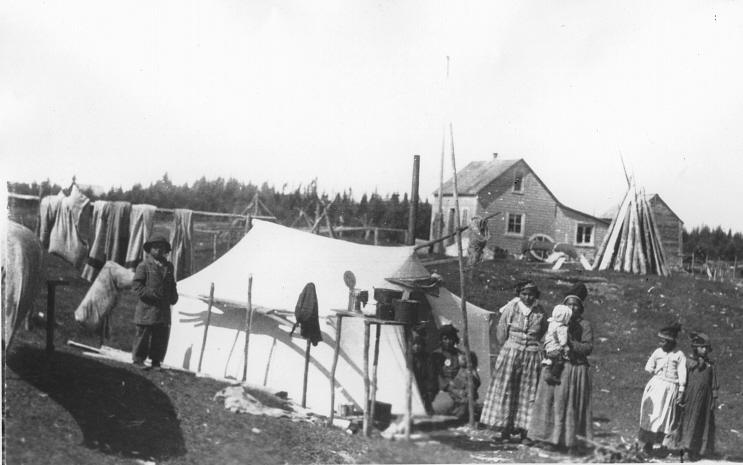
Aboriginal group at Mingan, 1920

The Innu's nomadic way of life was disrupted during World War II, as mining and forestry companies moved into the area. After the war, mandatory education, fluctuating fur prices, and government housing programs led the Innu to settle permanently there.

On April 30, 1963, the Government of Québec transferred 7 square miles (18 km^{2}) of land in the seignory of Mingan to the Government of Canada to establish a reserve for the Mingan region Innu. The reserve however had no access to the Mingan River, which the Innu depended on for subsistence. After many years of struggle, the river banks were added to the reserve in 1983. In 1996, it was further expanded.

== Waterway ==
Ports of the Gulf of St. Lawrence, on the Côte-Nord Shore: Blanc-Sablon, Harrington Harbor, Natashquan, Havre-Saint-Pierre, Mingan, Port-Menier (Anticosti Island), Cap-aux-Meules (Îles-de-la-Madeleine).

== Demographics ==
As of 2022, the band counted 690 members, of which 635 persons are living in the community.

Private dwellings occupied by usual residents amount to 160 out of a total of 165. Mother tongues spoken on the reserve are (2021):

- English as first language: 0%
- French as first language: 1.8%
- Innu (Montagnais) as first language: 82.7%
- French and other as first language: 16.4%

Historical census populations – Mingan

Year	Pop.	±%
1976	308	—
1981	274	−11.0%
1986	351	+28.1%
1991	365	+4.0%
1996	431	+18.1%

Year	Pop.	±%
2001	391	−9.3%
2006	407	+4.1%
2011	453	+11.3%
2016	552	+21.9%
2021	552	+0.0%

Source: Statistics Canada

== Culture ==
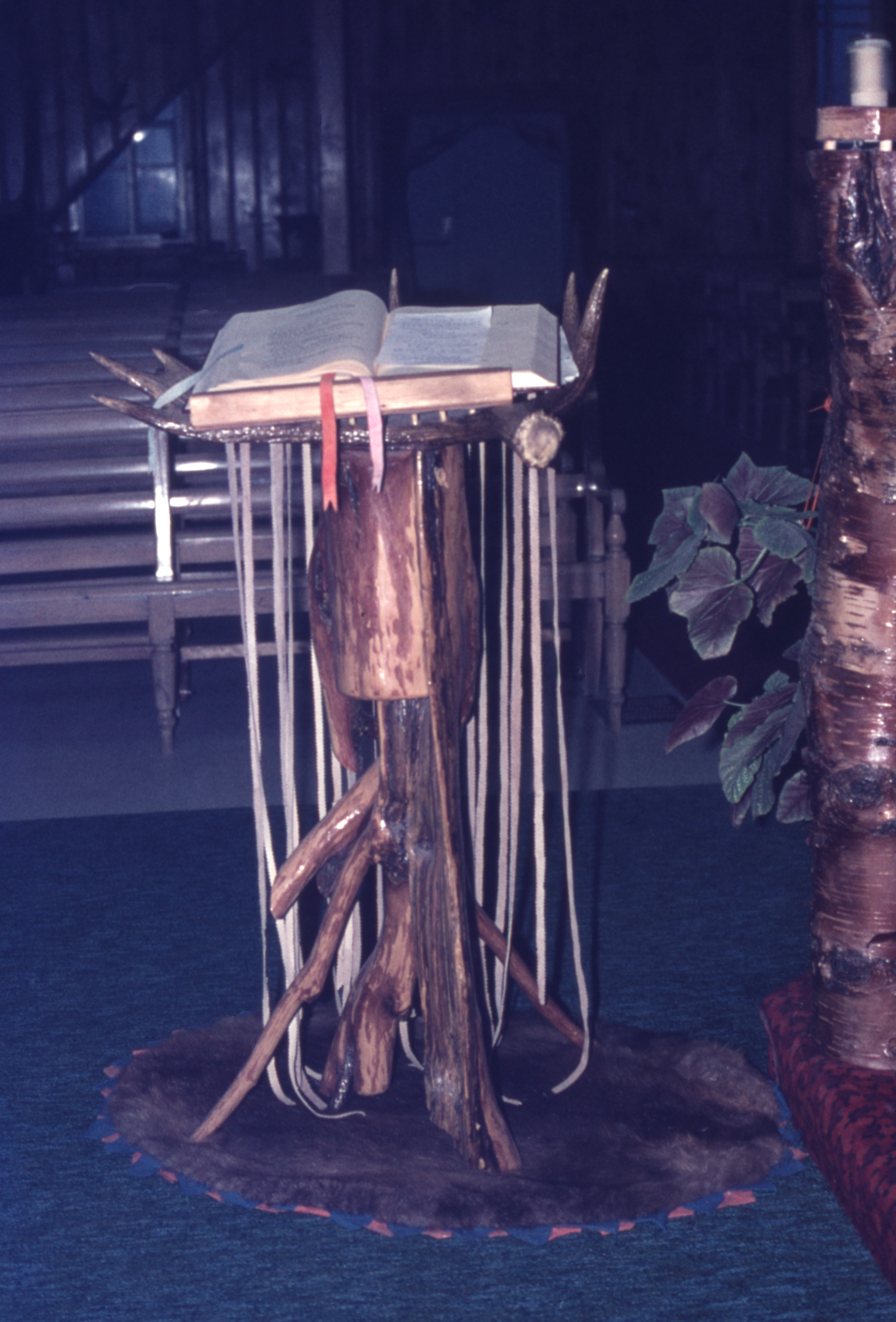
Lectern and liturgical book

St. George's Church, catholic Innu Mission, was built in the years 1917-1918 by John Maloney, and is entirely decorated with works created by Innu and Montagnais artists from Ekuanitshit.

Cultural heritage: Ekuanitshit/St Georges de Mingan church

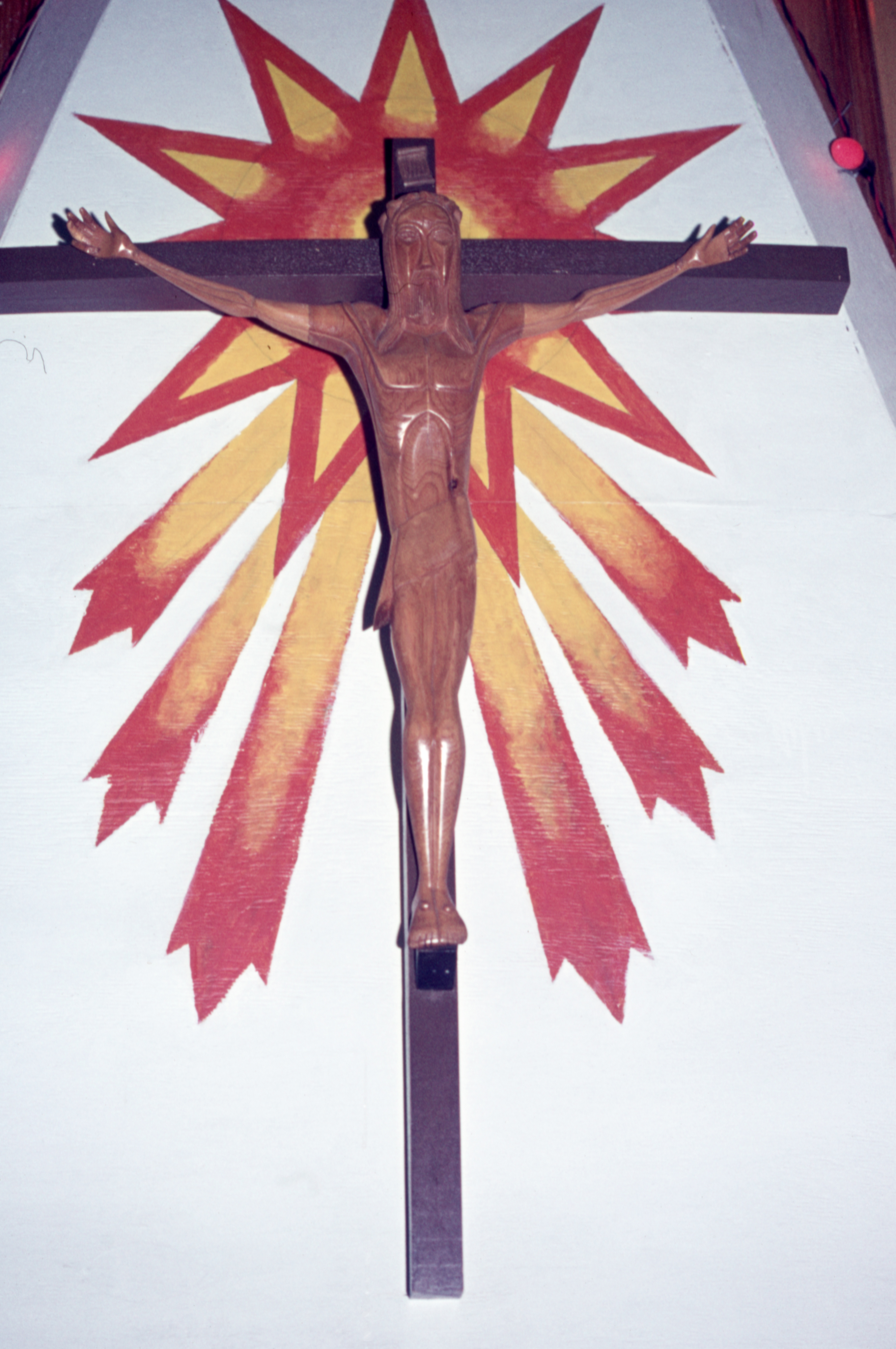
Large crucifix above the high altar

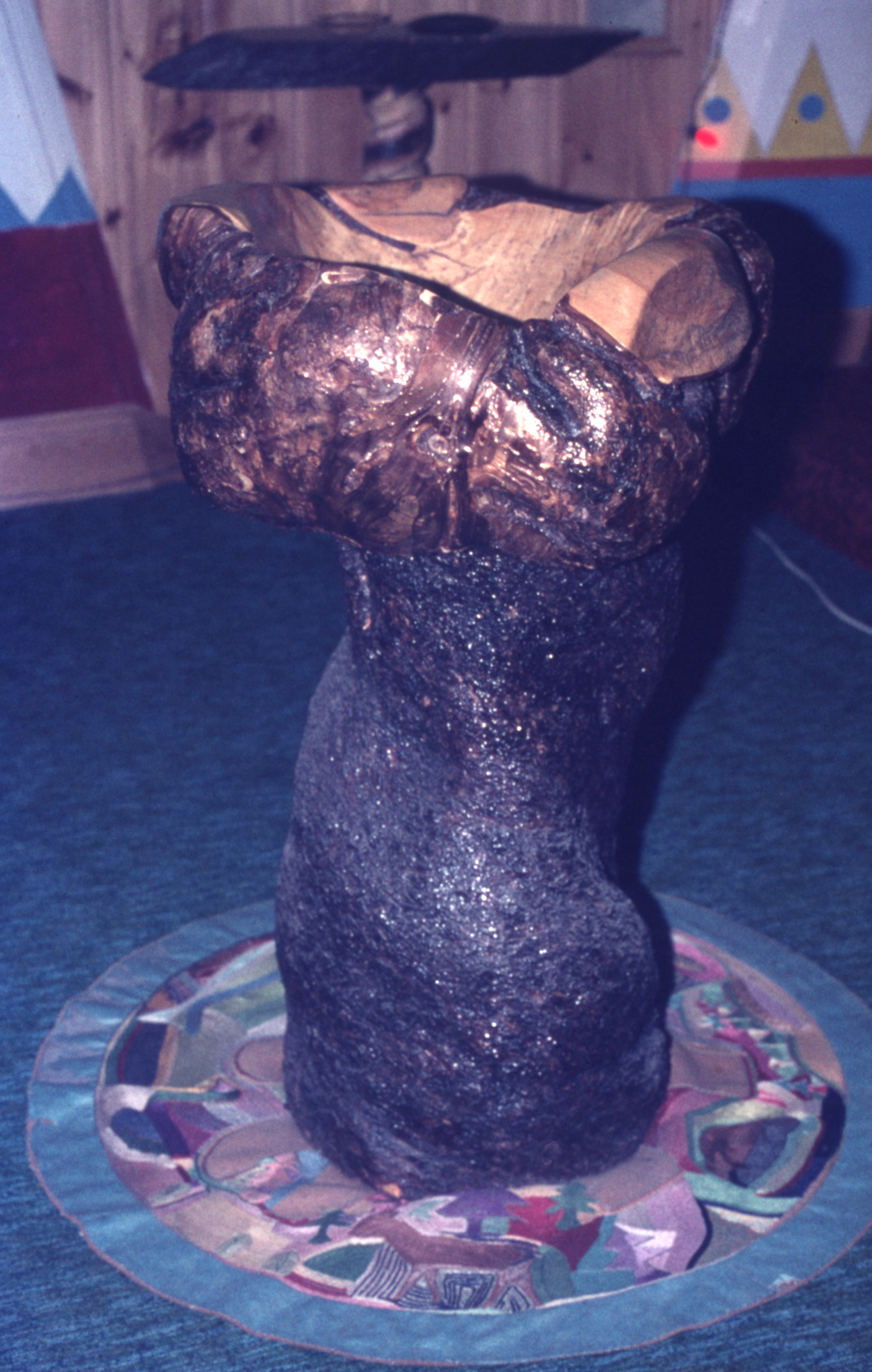
Holy water font or perhaps baptismal font

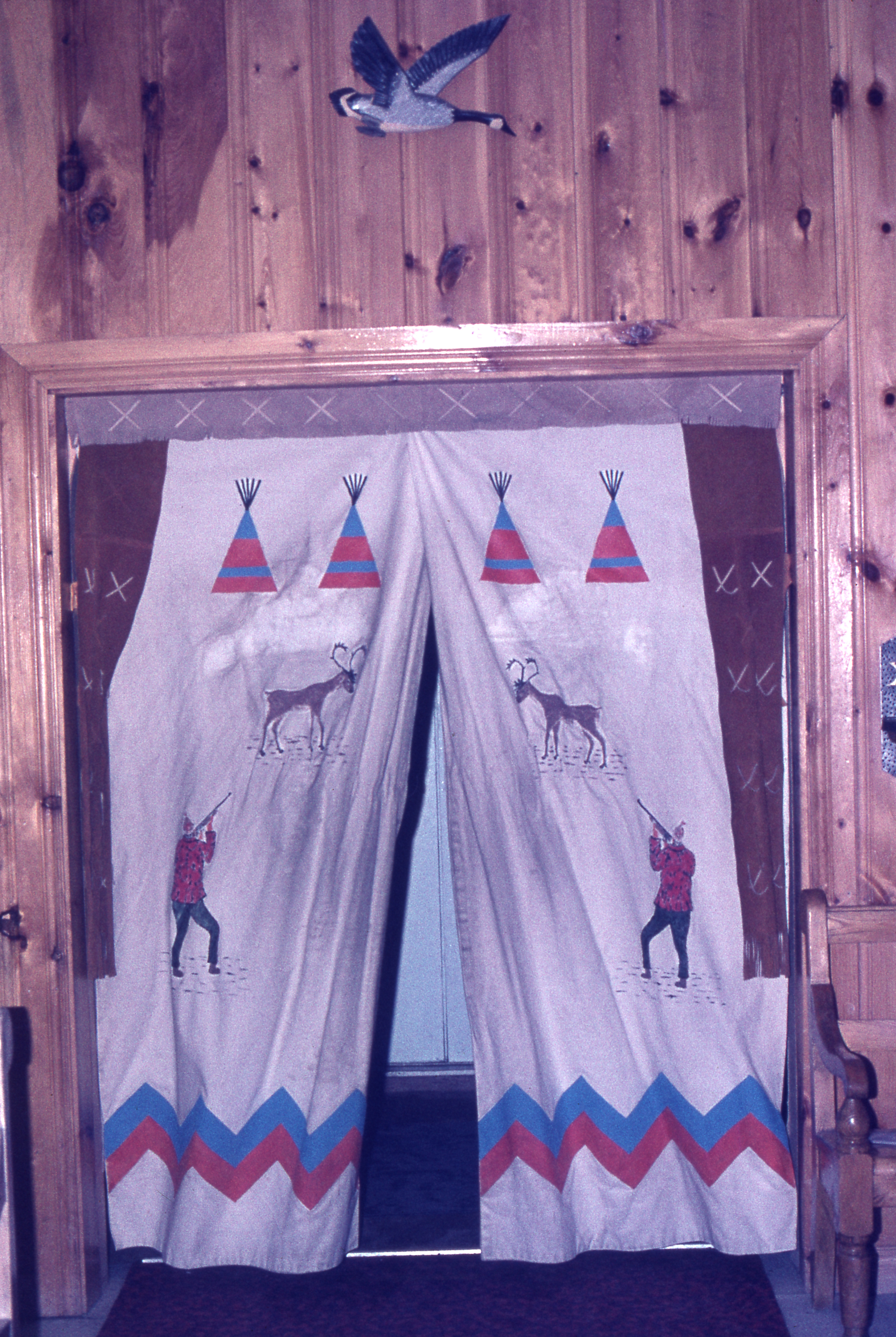
Innu patterned curtains, hunting, game, tents

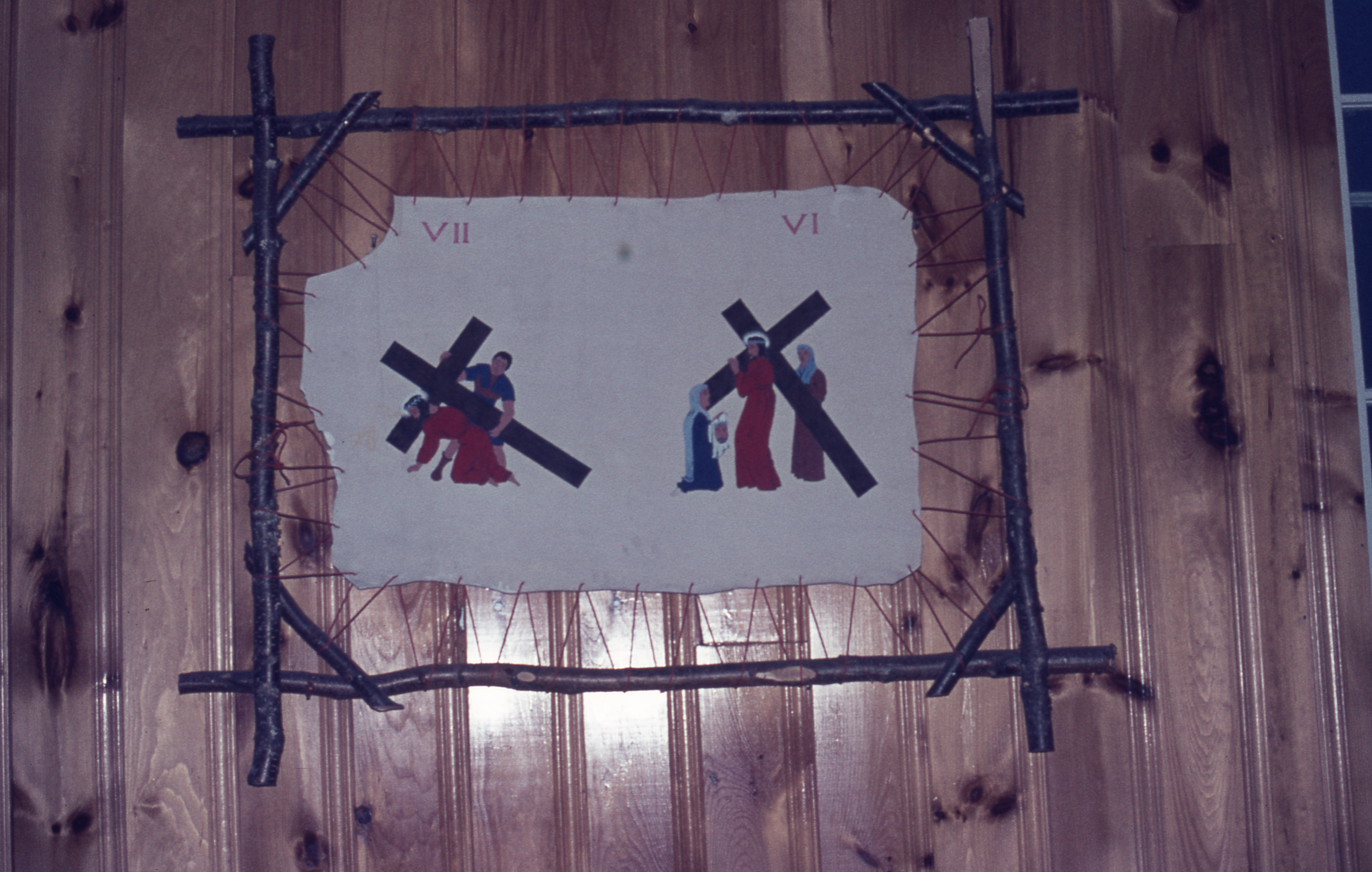
Stations of the cross, stations VI - VII - VIII - IX

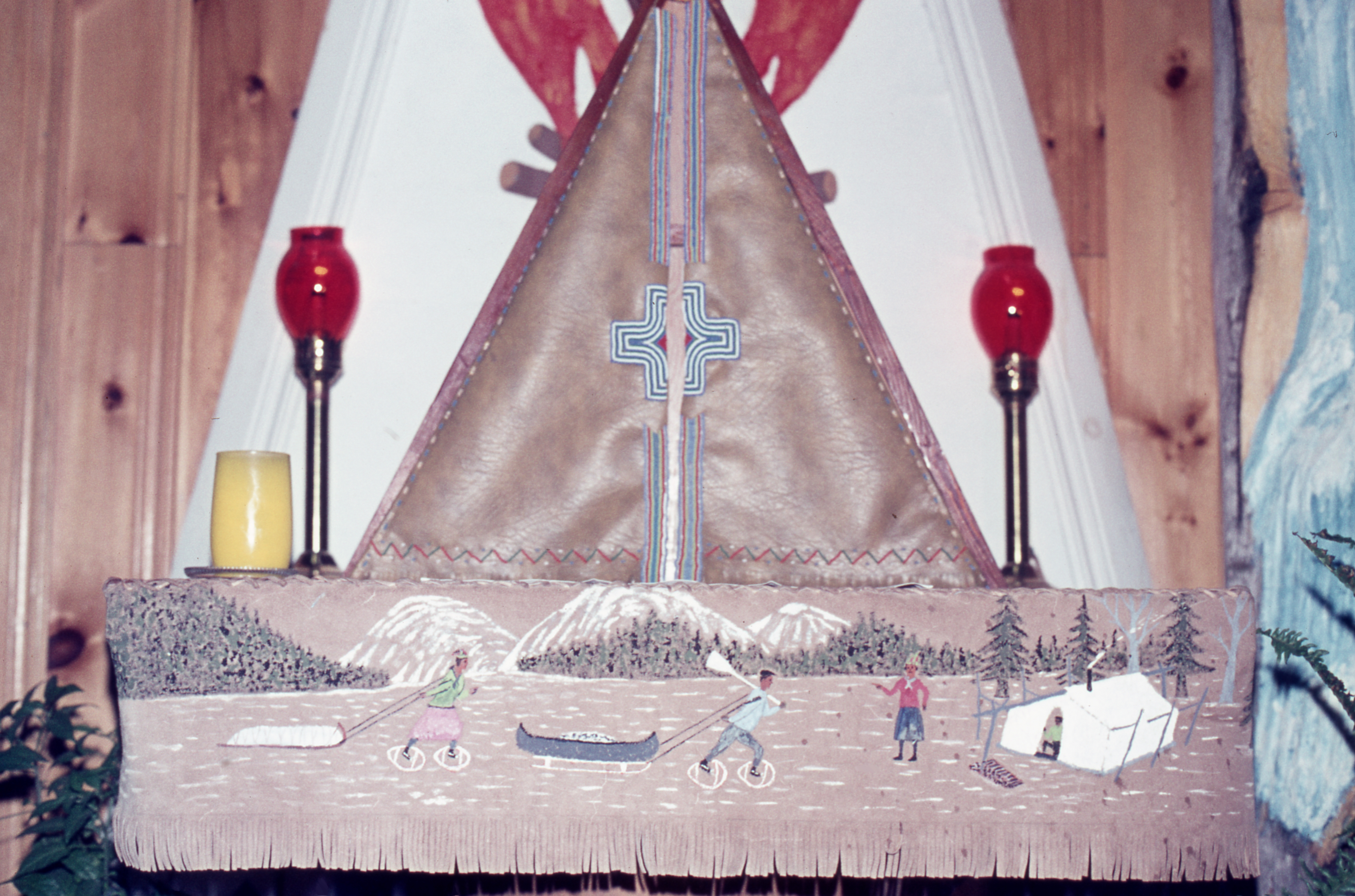
High altar, tabernacle, lamps and painted cloth

== Education ==
There is only one school on the reserve, École Teueikan, that provides pre-Kindergarten to Secondary grade 4, and had an enrollment of 106 students in 2008–2009.

== See also ==
- Innus of Ekuanitshit
