= Innus of Ekuanitshit =

Coordinates: 50°18′0″N 64°2′0″W

- Band No. 82
- People: Innu
- Headquarters: Ekuanitshit
- Province: Quebec

Land
- Main reserve: Mingan
- Land area: 38.38 km^{2} (14.82 sq mi)

Population (October 2019)
- On reserve: 623
- On other land: 13
- Off reserve: 41
- Total population: 677

Government
- Chief: Jean-Charles Piétacho
- Council: Leo Basile; Rita Mestokosho; Josiane Napish; Mario Piétacho

Tribal Council
- Regroupement Mamit Innuat

Website
- Ekuanitshit.com

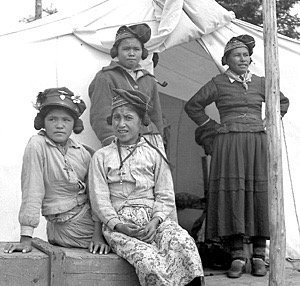
Innu women at Mingan, Quebec in 1947

Innus of Ekuanitshit (French: Les Innus d'Ekuanitshit) are a First Nation band in Quebec, Canada. They live primarily in the Indian reserve of Mingan on the north coast of the St Lawrence River. As of October 2019, the band had a registered population of 677 members.

== Demographics ==
Members of the band of Ekuanitshit are Innus. As of October 2019, the Nation had a total registered population of 677 members, of which 54 lived off reserve. According to the 2016 Canadian Census, the median age of the population is 24.9 years old.

== Geography ==
Innus of Ekuanitshit has only one reserve, Mingan, also called Ekuanitshit, where the band is headquartered and where lived the majority of its members. The reserve is located on Quebec Route 138, 28 kilometres (17 mi) west of Havre-Saint-Pierre in the Côte-Nord region in Quebec at the mouth of the Mingan River on the St Lawrence River. It covers an area of 3,838 hectares (9,480 acres). The closest important city is Sept-Îles.

== Governance ==
Innus of Ekuanitshit are governed by a band council elected according to a custom electoral system based on Section 11 of the Indian Act. For the 2018 to 2021 tenure, this council is composed of the chief Jean-Charles Piétacho and four councillors.

== Languages ==
The language spoken by the Innus is Innu-aimun, a language of the Cree-Innu-Naskapi dialect continuum of the Algonquian languages family. According to the 2016 Canadian Census, 95.4% of the Innus of Ekuanitshit have an Aboriginal language has the first language learned and 100% know an Aboriginal language and speak it at home. With respect to official languages, 6.4% know both, 88.1% know only French and 0% know only English.

== See also ==
- Mingan, Quebec
- Innu
- First Nations
