= Placide Vigneau =

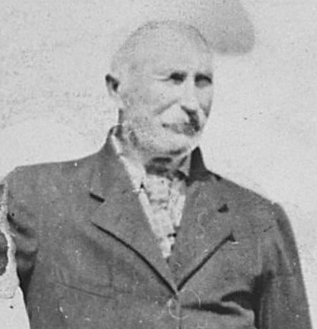
- Vigneau c. 1920
- Born: 29 August 1842; Île du Havre aux Maisons, Magdalen Islands, Canada East
- Died: 1 March 1926 (aged 83); Havre-Saint-Pierre, Quebec, Canada
- Occupation: Writer

Placide Vigneau (29 August 1842 − 1 March 1926 was a French Canadian author. He was keeper of the Île aux Perroquets Lighthouse from 1892 to 1912. He kept a journal that is preserved by the Bibliothèque et Archives nationales du Québec.

== Life ==
Placide Vigneau was born on Île du Havre aux Maisons, on the Magdalen Islands in Canada East on August 29, 1842. His parents were Vital Vigneau, an offshore fisherman of Acadian descent, and Élise Boudreau. He spent his childhood on the Magdalen Islands, where he learned the job of offshore fisherman. In 1858, the family moved to the village of Pointe-aux-Esquimaux (now Havre-Saint-Pierre) on the north shore of the Saint Lawrence River.

In 1892 he became the lighthouse keeper of Île aux Perroquets until 1912, when his son Hector succeeded him. His Histoire or Journal de la Pointe aux Esquimaux was published in the Report of the Archives du Québec (1968), and then as a work under the title Un pied d'ancre : journal de Placide Vigneau (1969). His work bears witness to the life of the inhabitants of Côte-Nord.

He died at Pointe-aux-Esquimaux on 1 March 1926. The Baie Placide-Vigneau was named in his honor.
