= Mingan Archipelago =

Coordinates: 50°12′33″N 63°35′22″W

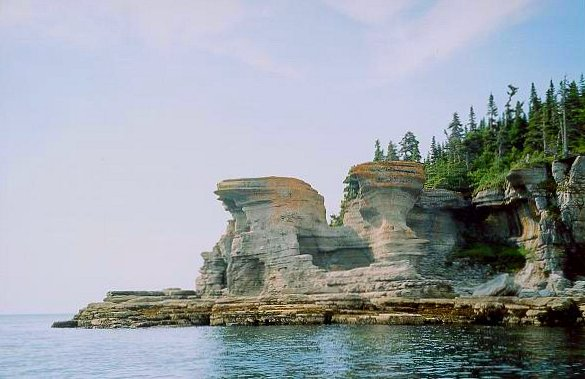
Mingan Archipelago National Park

The Mingan Archipelago is an archipelago located east of Quebec, Canada. It consists of a chain of about 40 islands.

Starting but 124 miles from the end of the road along the north shore of the St. Lawrence River (Le Fleuve), the Mingan Archipelago National Park Reserve of Canada spreads about 109 miles eastward as it dots the coastline with over 2,000 islands and islets. To the southwest a 9 to 10 hour drive away lies Quebec City. Due south across a 12-mile channel is Anticosti Island and below Anticosti another 25 miles is the eastern tip of the Gaspé Peninsula. To the east is a roadless coastline all the way to Newfoundland and Labrador. To the north are tundra, lakes, bog and rock. In late June it is still Spring. Politically, most of the islands lie in the town of Havre-Saint-Pierre, but the westernmost of the chain lie in the municipality of Longue-Pointe-de-Mingan.

The archipelago includes Île Niapiskau and its limestone monoliths.
