= Longue-Pointe-de-Mingan =

- Municipality
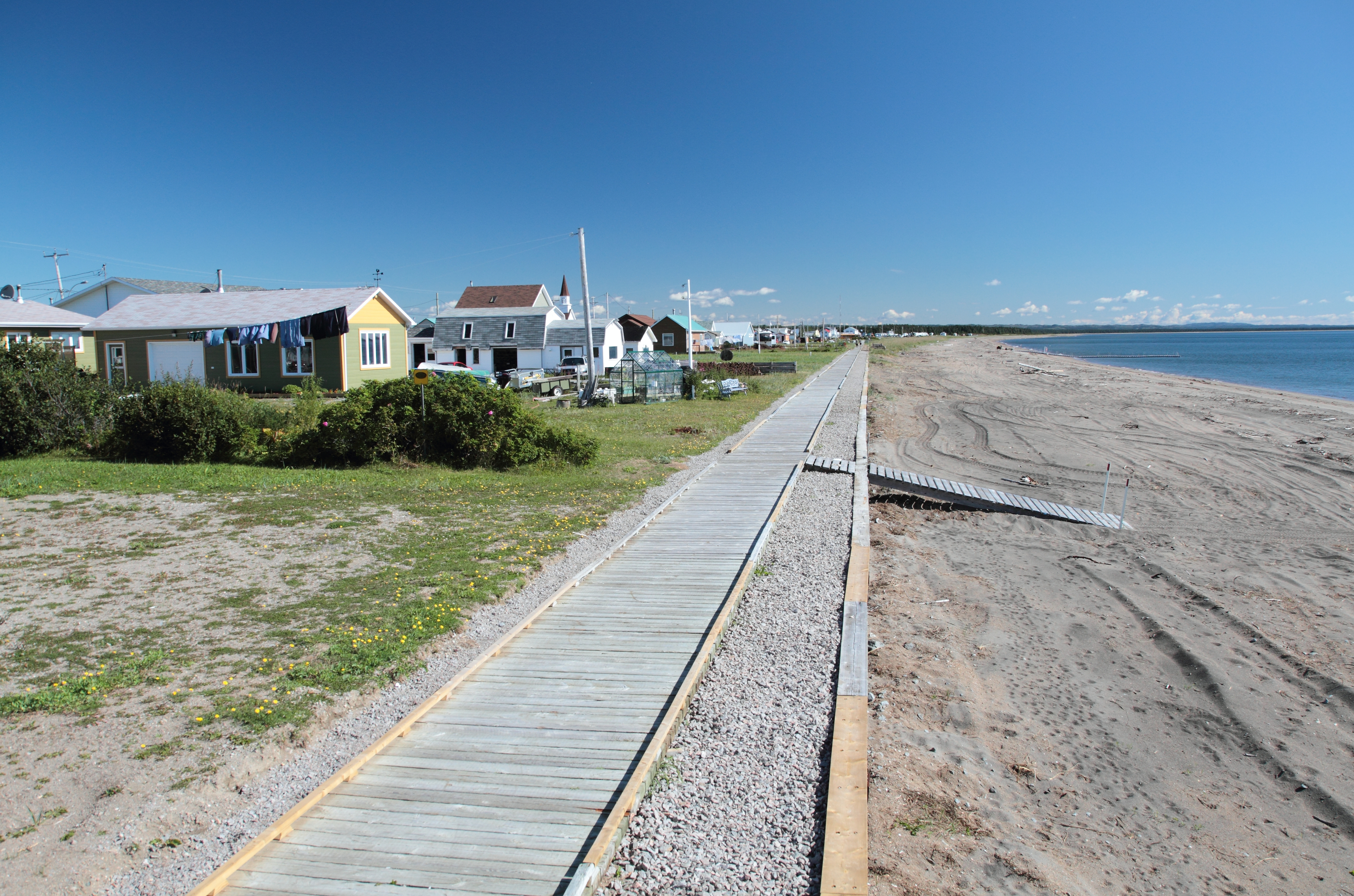

- Location in Côte-Nord region of Quebec
- Coordinates: 50°16′N 64°09′W
- Country: Canada
- Province: Quebec
- Region: Côte-Nord
- RCM: Minganie
- Settled: c. 1880
- Constituted: January 1, 1966

Government
  - Mayor: Ginette Paquet
  - Federal riding: Côte-Nord—Kawawachikamach—Nitassinan
  - Prov. riding: Duplessis

Area
  - Total: 643.21 km^{2} (248.34 sq mi)
  - Land: 370.03 km^{2} (142.87 sq mi)
- Elevation: 0 m (0 ft)

Population (2021)
  - Total: 408
  - Density: 1.1/km^{2} (2.8/sq mi)
  - Pop (2016-21): ▼6.0%
  - Dwellings: 257
- Time zone: UTC−5 (EST)
  - Summer (DST): UTC−4 (EDT)
- Postal code(s): G0G 1V0
- Area codes: 418 and 581
- Highways: R-138

Longue-Pointe-de-Mingan (French pronunciation: [lɔ̃ɡ pwɛ̃t də mɛ̃ɡɑ̃]) is a municipality located on the north shore of the Gulf of St. Lawrence, in Minganie Regional County Municipality (RCM), Côte-Nord region, Quebec, Canada.

== Toponymy ==
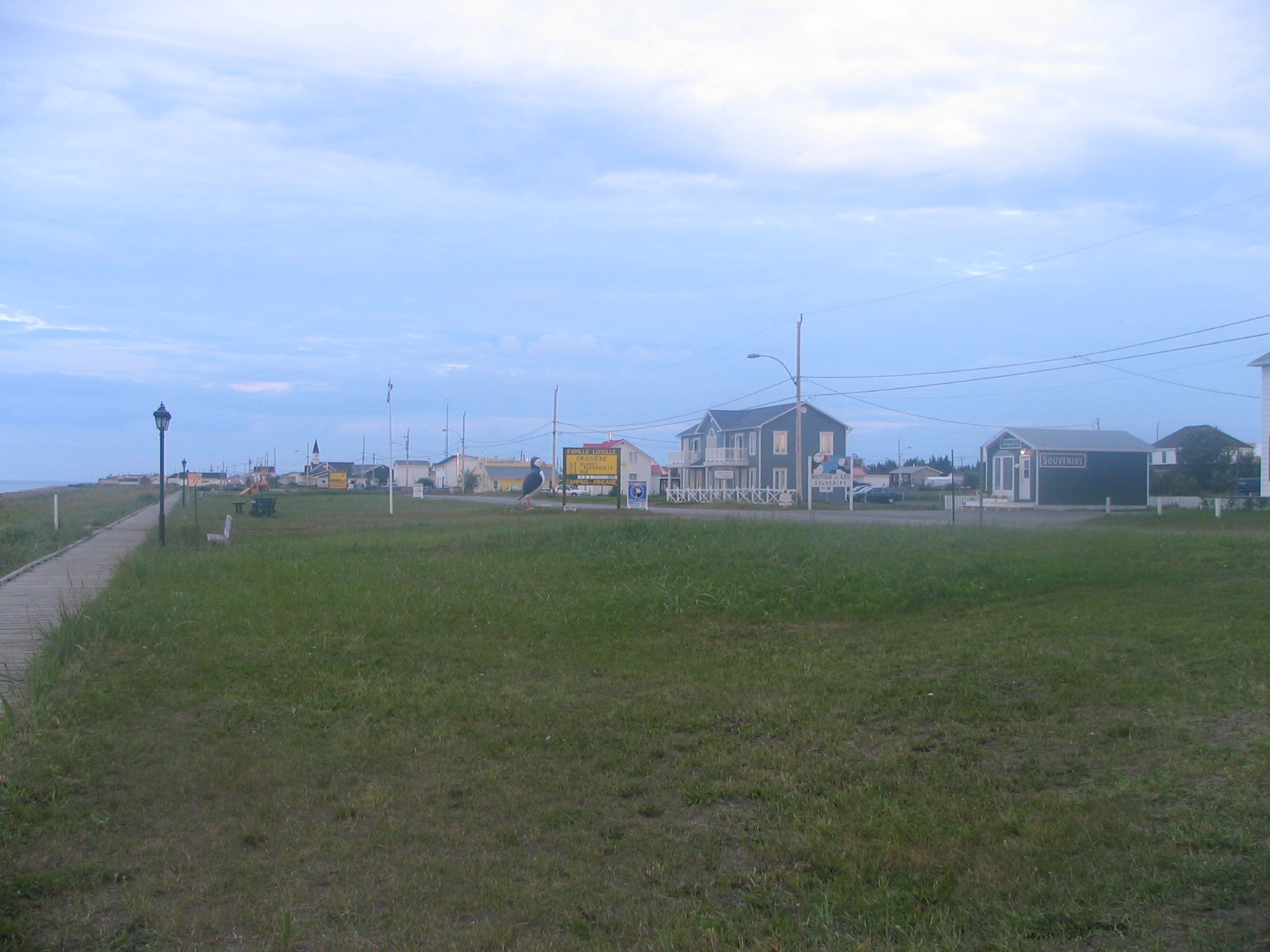
Longue-Pointe-de-Mingan Boardwalk, rue de la Mer

The descriptive name Longue-Pointe (French for "Long Point") refers to a long spit of sand west of the village that has had various names through the centuries: first called Longue Pointe on a map of 1735, followed by the English form of Long Point in the late 17th and early 18th century, then Mingan Point on the map of Captain Carver (1776). James Cook and Placide Vigneau called it Pointe de Mingan (1784) and Longue-Pointe-de-Mingan (1857) respectively.

== History ==
Around 1880, the first settlers arrived, mostly from Paspébiac, themselves descendants of Acadians. In 1885, the post office opened. The municipality was officially created in 1966 as Longue-Pointe, but renamed to Longue-Pointe-de-Mingan in 1997.

== Demographics ==
=== Population ===
Canada census – Longue-Pointe-de-Mingan community profile

	2021	2016	2011
Population	408 (-6.0% from 2016)	434 (-9.4% from 2011)	479 (+11.4% from 2006)
Land area	370.03 km^{2} (142.87 sq mi)	387.81 km^{2} (149.73 sq mi)	388.76 km^{2} (150.10 sq mi)
Population density	1.1/km^{2} (2.8/sq mi)	1.1/km^{2} (2.8/sq mi)	1.2/km^{2} (3.1/sq mi)
Median age	56.4 (M: 55.2, F: 56.8)	51.5 (M: 51.1, F: 53.3)	50.1 (M: 49.2, F: 51.9)
Private dwellings	257 (total) 204 (occupied)	229 (total) 201 (occupied)	229 (total)
Median household income	$84,000	$78,080	$.N/A

Notes: 2011 income data for this area has been suppressed for data quality or confidentiality reasons.
References: 2021 2016 2011

Historical Census Data - Longue-Pointe-de-Mingan, Quebec

Year	Pop.	±%
1966	483	—
1971	547	+13.3%
1976	560	+2.4%
1981	651	+16.3%
1986	612	−6.0%
1991	552	−9.8%

Year	Pop.	±%
1996	537	−2.7%
2001	505	−6.0%
2006	430	−14.9%
2011	479	+11.4%
2016	434	−9.4%
2021	408	−6.0%

Source: Statistics Canada

=== Language ===
Canada Census Mother Tongue - Longue-Pointe-de-Mingan, Quebec
Census	Total	French			English			French & English			Other		
Year	Responses	Count	Trend	Pop %	Count	Trend	Pop %	Count	Trend	Pop %	Count	Trend	Pop %
2011	485	460	▲9.8%	94.85%	10	▲ n/a%	2.06%	0	0.0%	0.00%	15	▲33.3%	3.09%
2006	425	415	▼17.0%	97.65%	0	0.0%	0.00%	0	0.0%	0.00%	10	0.0%	2.35%
2001	510	500	▼4.8%	98.04%	0	0.0%	0.00%	0	0.0%	0.00%	10	▲ n/a%	1.96%
1996	525	525	n/a	100.00%	0	n/a	0.00%	0	n/a	0.00%	0	n/a	0.00%

== Tourism ==
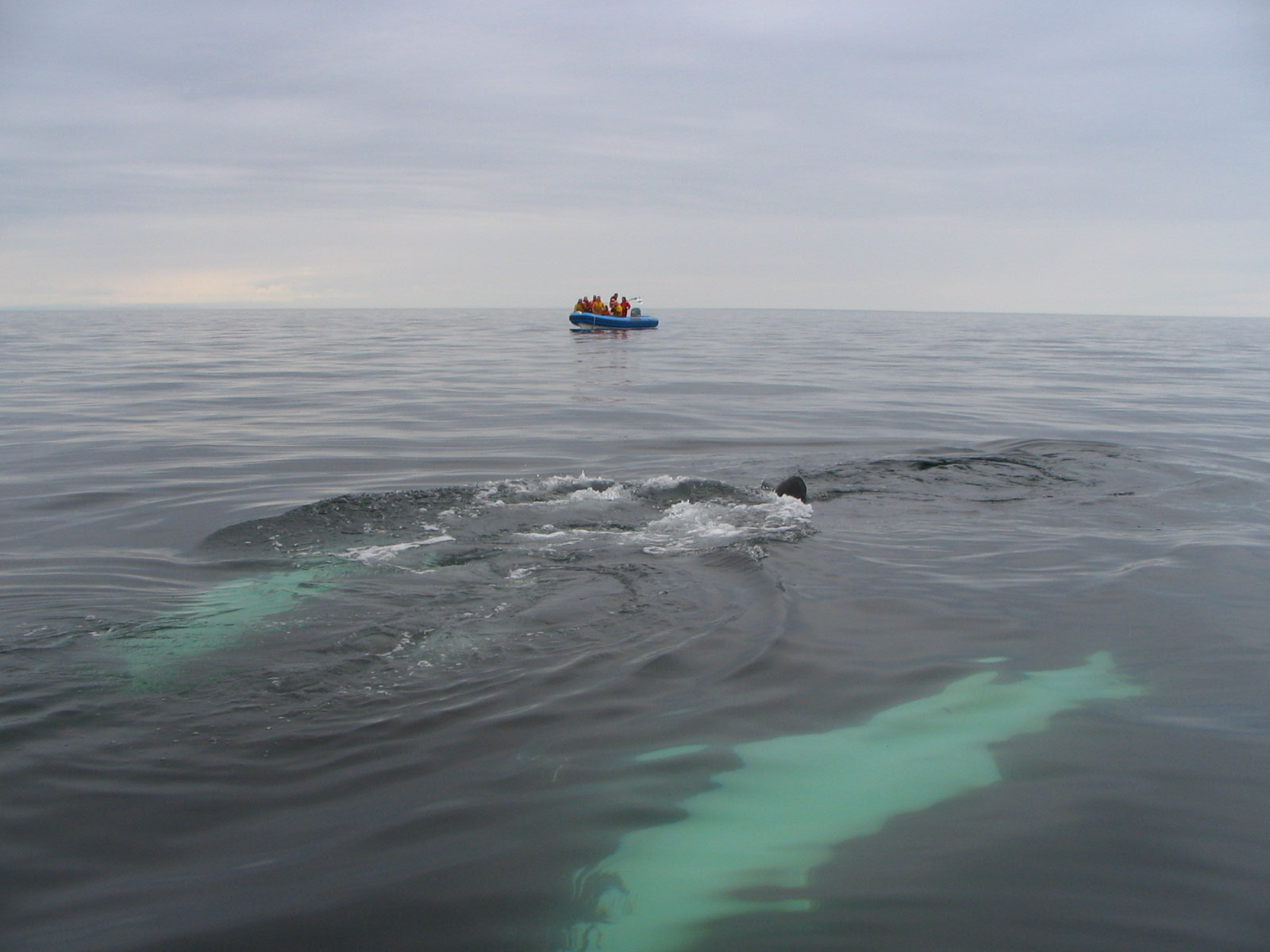
Humpback whale, aboard an inflatable boat from the Mingan Island Cetacean Study team

In the region, there is a statue of a Giant Puffin. It is a tribute to the seabirds that live in colonies around the town's shores. On July 5, 2010, Canada Post made a commemorative stamp of the giant Atlantic Puffin as part of its Roadside Attractions collection.

The town is also the location of the Mingan Island Cetacean Study (MICS), a research station that studies marine animals. MICS gives tourists the opportunity to support the organization by allowing visitors to ride on a zodiac with the research team, visitors can expect to come within meters of whales and other marine animals.

Longue-Pointe-de-Mingan is accessible by the sea, and via The Whale Route (Route 138).

With 33,000 kilometres (21,000 mi) of trails, The Federation of Snowmobile Clubs of Quebec and La Minganie Snowmobile Club, based in Les Escoumins, offer detailed interactive maps on the different snowmobile circuits and their points of service.

== See also ==
- List of municipalities in Quebec
