= Nastapoka River =

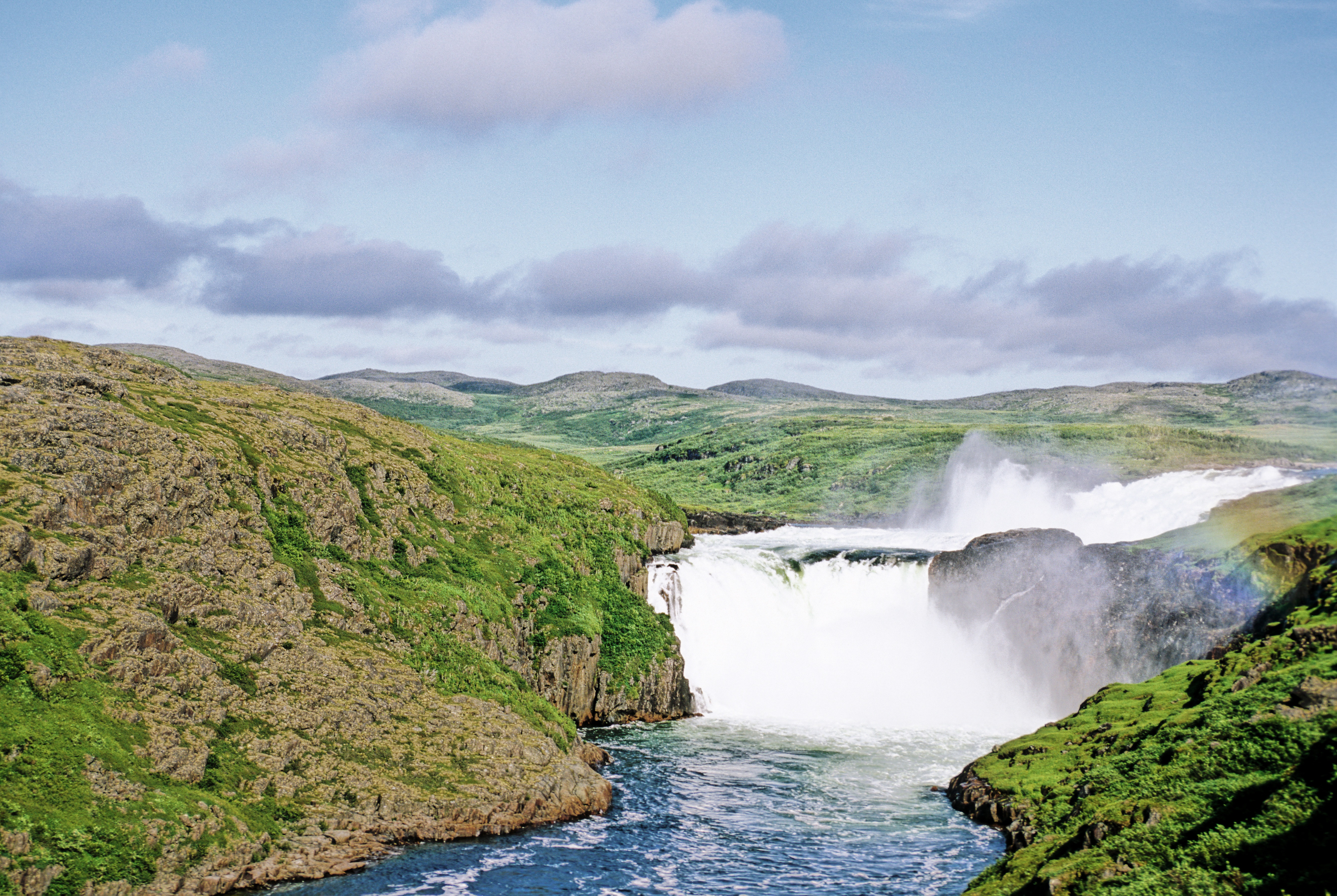
- Twin Falls on Nastapoka River

Location
- Country: Canada
- Province: Quebec
- Region: Nord-du-Québec

Physical characteristics
- Source: Lacs des Loups Marins
  - location: Nord-du-Québec, Quebec
  - coordinates: 56°30′31″N 73°44′58″W
  - elevation: 373 m (1,224 ft)
- Mouth
  - location: Hudson Bay
  - coordinates: 56°54′38″N 76°32′46″W
  - elevation: 23 m (75 ft)
- Length: 402 km (250 mi)
- Basin size: 13,364 km^{2} (5,160 sq mi)
- Discharge
  - average: 175 m^{3}/s (6,200 cu ft/s)

The Nastapoka River is a tributary of Eastern shore of Hudson Bay, flowing in the administrative region of Nord-du-Québec, in Quebec, Canada. This river is one of the most important rivers of Nord-du-Québec, the 39th of Quebec because its watershed of 13,400 square kilometres (5,200 sq mi).

== Geography ==
The Nastapoka River flows into the Nastapoka Channel, on the eastern slope of Hudson Bay, almost at the center of the Nastapoka Islands archipelago, after a run of some 400 kilometres (250 mi), at 40 kilometres (25 mi) north of the Inuit village of Umiujaq, Quebec and the immense Richmond Gulf.

This watercourse dotted with falls and rapids has its source in the Lacs des Loups Marins (English: Lake of Sea Wolves) (length: 84 kilometres (52 mi); width: 12 kilometres (7.5 mi); altitude: 373 metres (1,224 ft); area: 484 square kilometres (187 sq mi)), one of the few freshwater bodies in the world where seals can be seen.

The Nastapoka River Basin was originally part of the project to create the Lac-Guillaume-Delisle and Lac-à-l'Eau-claire National Park. In its most recent version, the Nastapoka Basin was removed for reasons of potential hydroelectric development.

== Toponym ==
The name "Nastapoka", expression of the Cree language, means someone found there a caribou killed by the rapids, meaning that fits perfectly with the landscape data, because just before its mouth, the river reaches sea level with a crash down Nastapoka Falls and its steep vertical drop of 35 metres (115 ft). The falls are a popular destination for visitors to Tursujuq National Park.

The Nastapoka River, between Kuujjuarapik and Inukjuak, also belongs to the land of the Inuit who named it Patirtuuq, that is, [where found] a large amount of bone marrow. The name Nastapoka River appears in the report of an exploration mission carried out in the sector in 1877 by the scientist Robert Bell. For its part, the name Rivière Nastapoka appears on the map of Quebec, leaflet north, published in 1914 by the Department of Lands and Forests. Its course, discontinuous, is approximate. The 1914 edition of the Dictionary of Rivers and Lakes of the Province of Quebec bears, probably by mistake, the Nastakopa form. It was in 1946 that the Quebec Geography Commission accepted the name Rivière Nastapoka. The official Quebec map of 1949 and the editions of 1969 of the Gazetteer and 1978 of the Toponymic Repertoire, among other documents, however, have the Nastapoca form. The Commission de toponymie restored the Nastapoka script in 1986. "

== Images ==
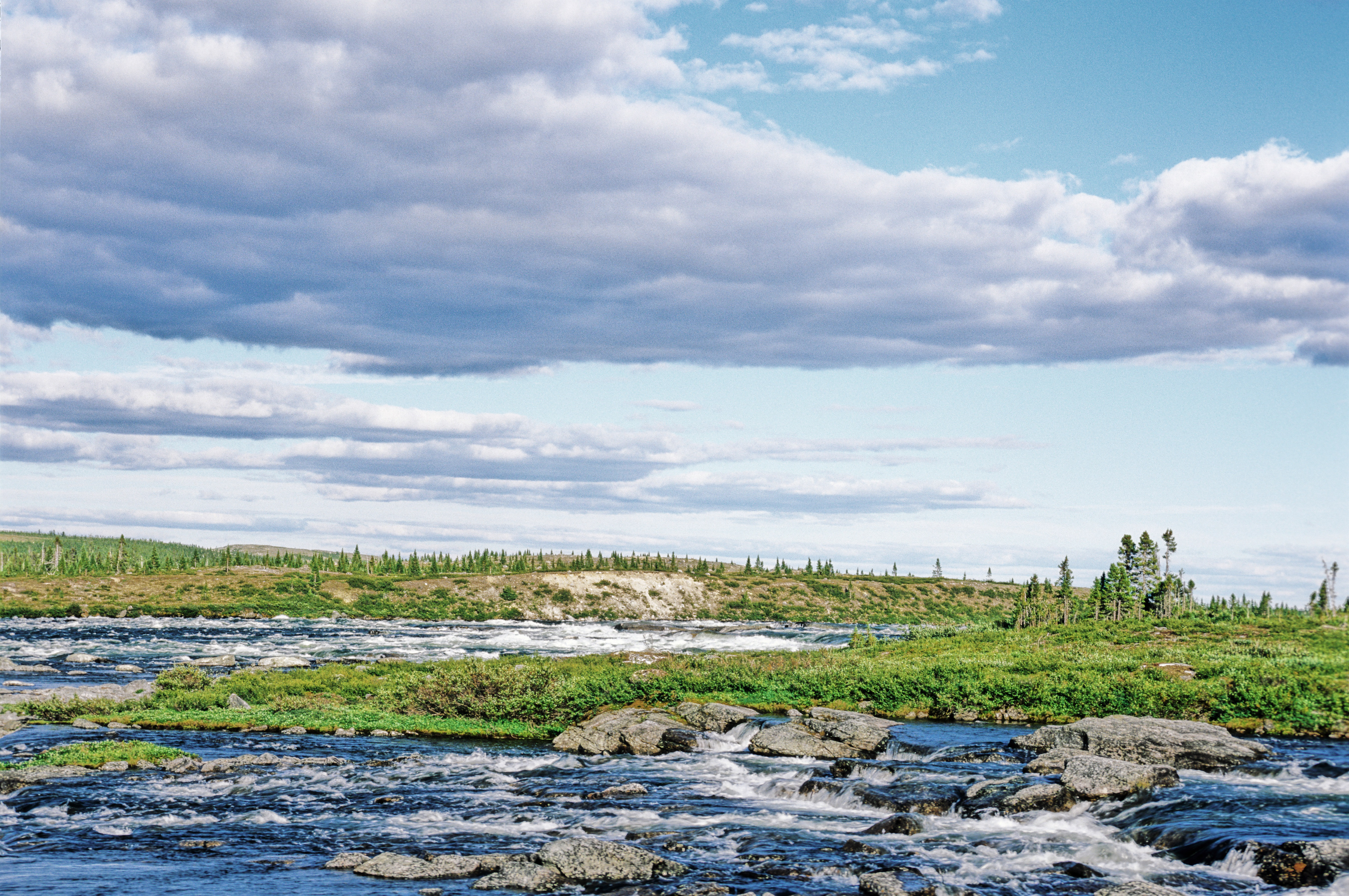
Rapids

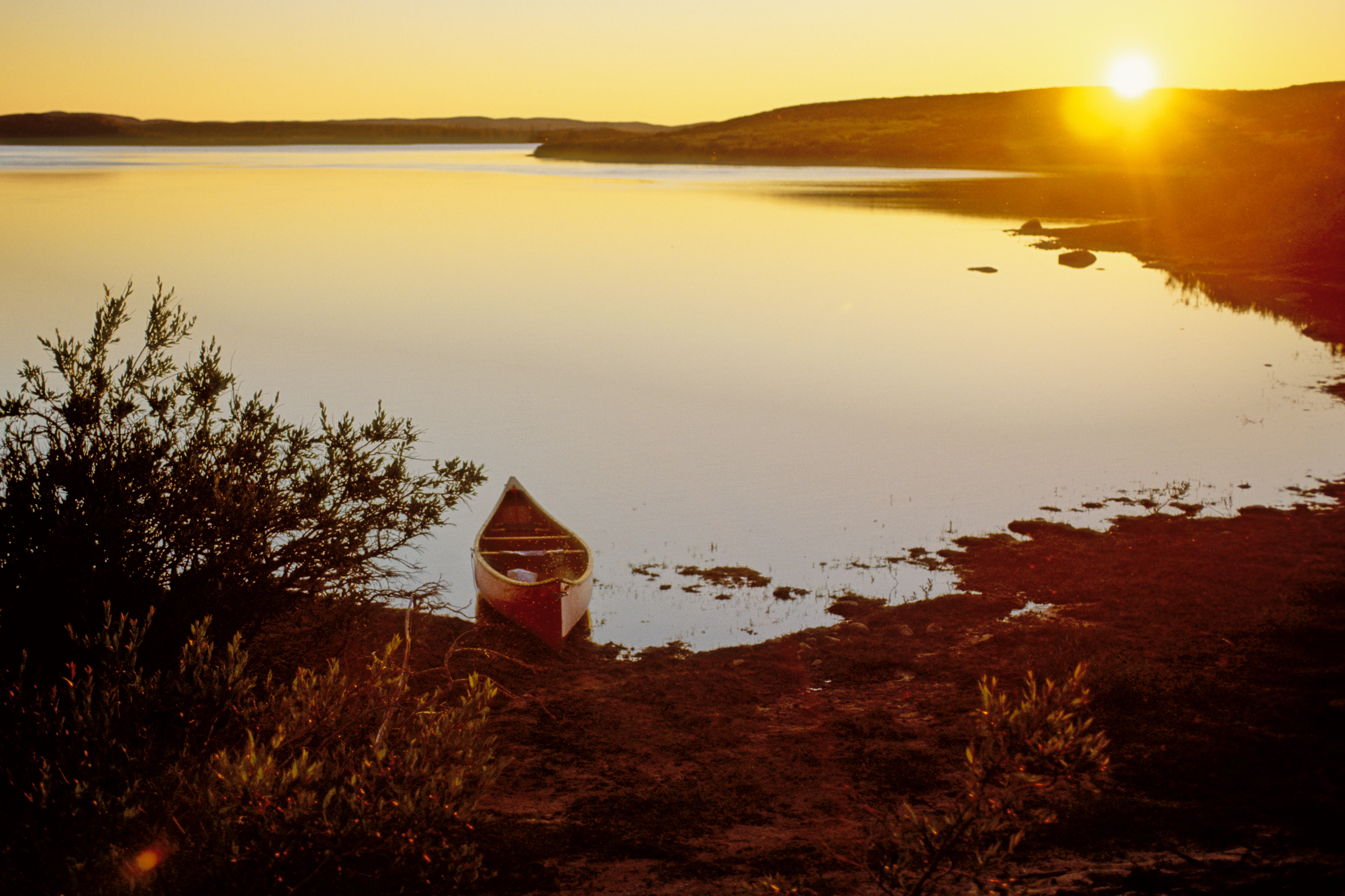
Sunset

== See also ==
- Lacs des Loups Marins
- Iilliq River, a watercourse
- Baie d'Hudson
- List of rivers of Quebec
