= Lacs des Loups Marins =

Group of lakes in Quebec, Canada

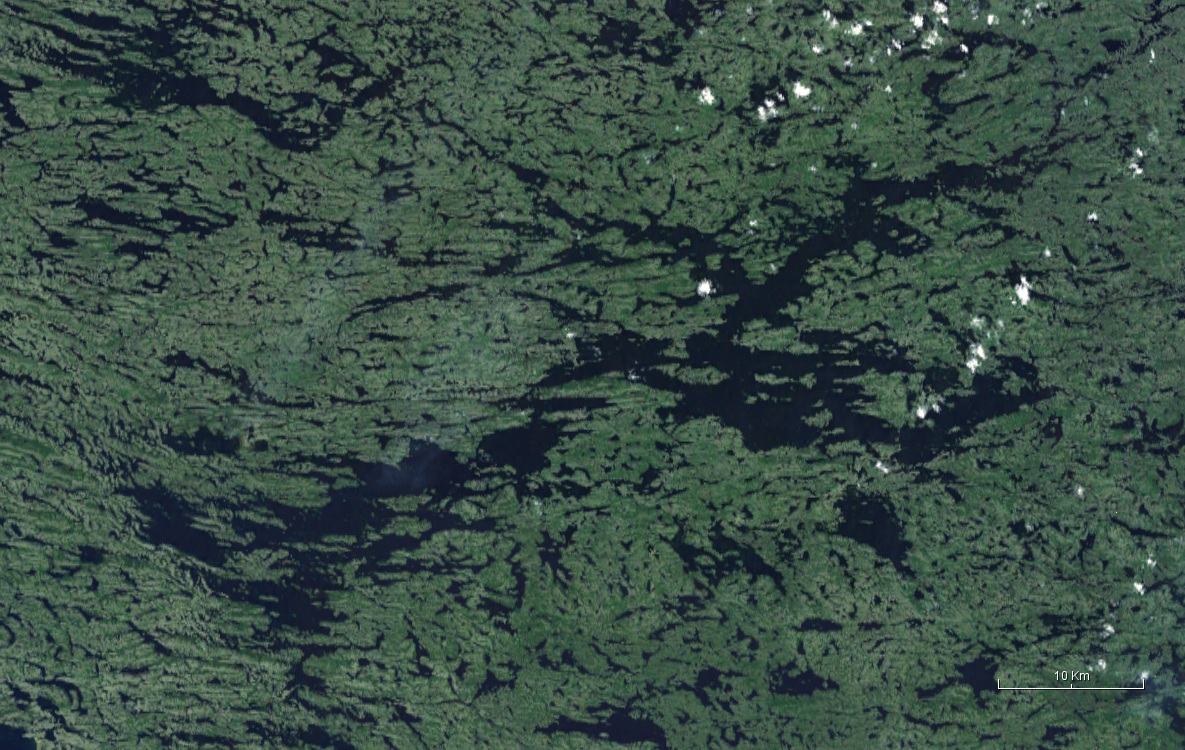
- NASA image of Lacs des Loups Marins

- Location in Quebec
- Location: Nunavik, Nord-du-Québec, Quebec
- Coordinates: 56°31′36″N 73°32′43″W
- Primary outflows: Nastapoka River
- Basin countries: Canada
- Max. length: 84 km (52 mi)
- Max. width: 12 km (7.5 mi)
- Surface area: 576 km^{2} (222 sq mi)
- Surface elevation: 262 m (860 ft)
- Frozen: November to June

Lacs des Loups Marins is a lake in the north of the province of Quebec in Canada. It is located about 150 km east of Hudson Bay and about 20 km northeast of Lac à l'Eau Claire.

The name comes from its population of harbour seals (French: loups marins, lit. 'sea wolves' or phoques 'seals'). They belong to the subspecies Phoca vitulina mellonae, the only type of seal in Canada that lives year-round in fresh water.

== History ==
The lake was known as Lower Seal Lake then Seal Lake until 1967 when it was named Lacs des Loups Marins. It was named after the Ungava seals that live on the shores and in the lake. The Cree called the lake Musiwaw Achikunipi (lake of seals in the tundra).

== See also ==
- Nastapoka River, a watercourse
- List of lakes of Quebec
