= Nastapoka arc =

Circular arc along the Hudson Bay coastline

Coordinates: 56°50′N 78°20′W

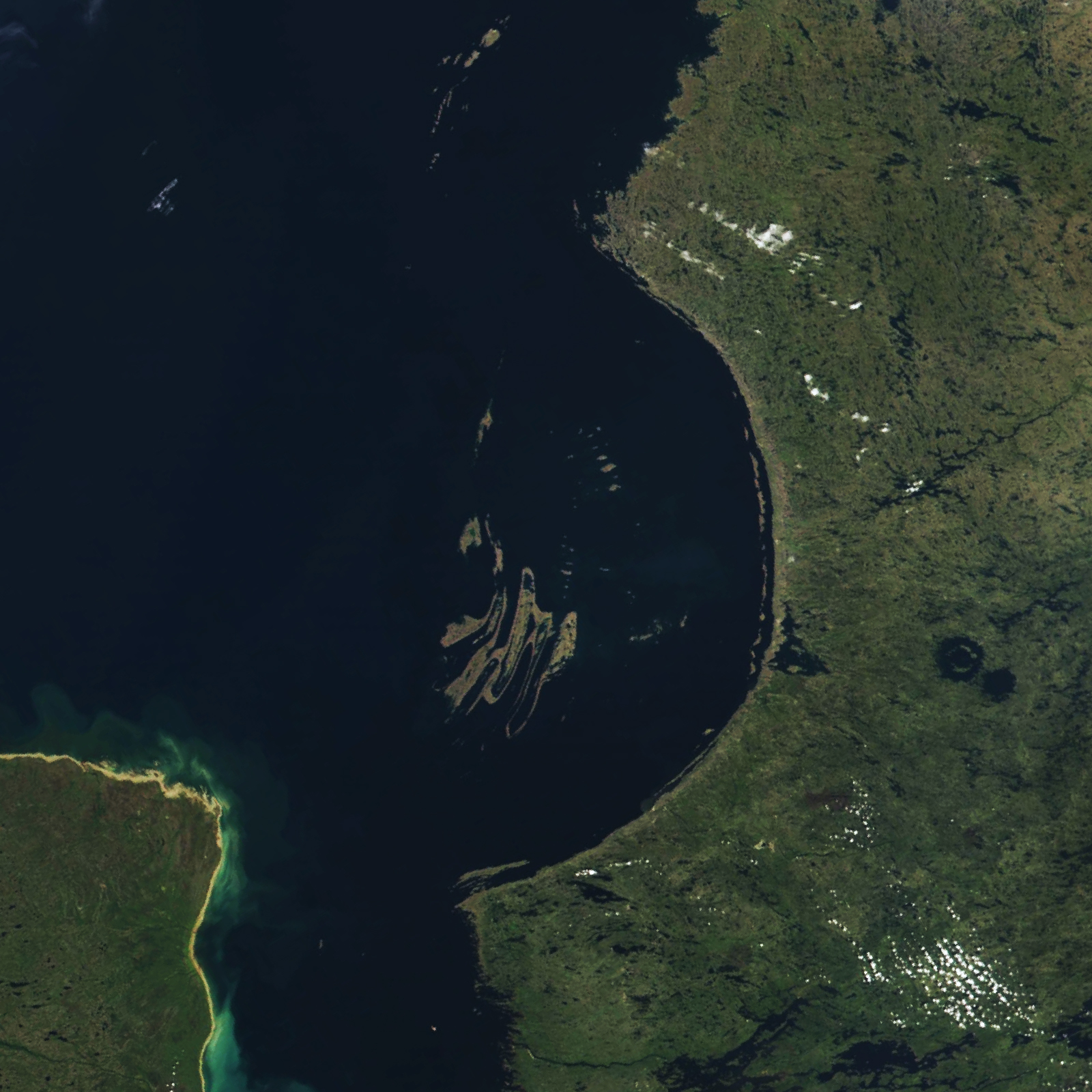
Satellite photograph of the Nastapoka Arc

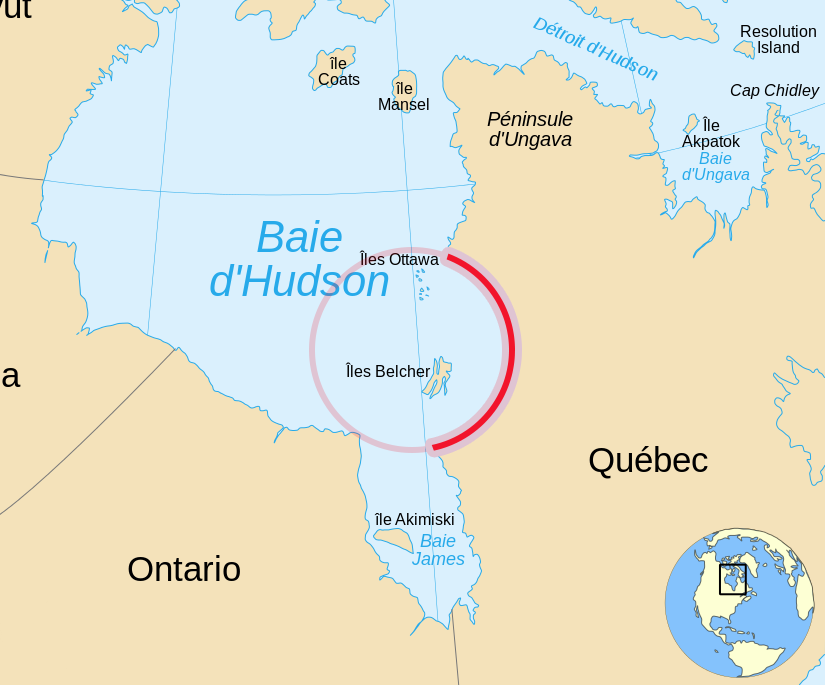
Nastapoka Arc map with conjectured circle

The Nastapoka arc is a curved segment of the southeastern shore of Hudson Bay in Quebec, Canada, that extends from the most northerly of the Hopewell Islands to Long Island near the junction with James Bay. It is a prominent, near-perfect circular arc, covering more than 160° of a 450-kilometre-diameter (280 mi) circle. While the circular shape has led to suggestions that it represents an impact crater, it is thought to have been formed as a result of lithospheric flexure during the Trans-Hudson orogeny.

== Geology ==
The bedrock that comprises the shoreline and landscape that lies inland of the Nastapoka arc largely consists of Archean rocks of the Superior craton. In areal distribution, these rocks consist of about 60% Archean granitic plutons and granitic gneiss. The granitic rocks include typically foliated granodiorites, quartz diorites, quartz monzonites, granites; related intrusive rocks; and their metamorphosed equivalents. Less common in occurrence are layered gneisses, migmatites, and hybrid rocks that often form easterly-trending linear belts. About 20% of the Superior craton consists of metamorphosed Archean volcanic and sedimentary rocks. They occur as tightly folded, lightly metamorphosed greenschist preserved in easterly-trending, elongate-to-irregular structural basins known as greenstone belts. The most abundant volcanic rock is metamorphosed basalts that exhibit primary structures, e.g. pillow lavas, indicative of underwater volcanic eruptions. The metamorphosed sedimentary strata consist largely of interbedded mudstones and sandstones exhibiting sedimentary structures indicative of turbidites.

A large triangular area surrounding Richmond Gulf, which includes a short segment of the Nastapoka arc, is underlain by about 1 kilometer (0.62 mi) of undeformed, pink and red, mainly fluvial, feldspar-rich sandstone that is interbedded with minor beds of conglomerate and basaltic, subaerial lava flows. These strata, which are known as the Richmond Gulf Group, rest unconformably on Archean crystalline rocks of the Superior craton and are now preserved by downfaulting only within the Richmond Gulf Graben. The graben, its faults, and the Richmond Gulf Group are unconformably overlain by the strata of the Nastapoka Group.

The portion of Hudson Bay immediately offshore of and partially encircled by the Nastapoka arc is underlain by Early Proterozoic strata of the Nastapoka Group. Adjacent to the Nastapoka arc, these strata form a homocline that dips gently westward and consists of unmetamorphosed to slightly metamorphosed sandstone, stromatolite-bearing dolomite, banded iron formation, and basalt. Further west, exposed in the Ottawa and Belcher Islands, the strata of the Nastapoka Group become highly faulted and tightly, often isoclinally, folded. These strata unconformably overlie Archean strata of the Superior craton and Proterozoic Richmond Group. The unconformity between the Early Proterozoic Nastapoka Group and the underlying Archean Superior craton lies just inland of Nastapoka arc as defined by the edge of arcuate eastern coastline of Hudson Bay. The unconformity consists of undeformed stromatolite-bearing dolomites overlying either foliated Archean granodiorite or the tilted and eroded strata of the Richmond Gulf Group. A thin, conglomeratic quartz sandstone separates the dolomites from the underlying strata and forms the base of the Nastapoka Group.

== Origin ==
The origin of the Nastapoka arc has been a source of disagreement and discussion among geologists, other Earth scientists, and planetary geologists. Noting the relatively small number of impact structures on Earth in relation to the Moon and Mars and remarkable curvature of the shoreline of this part of Hudson Bay, Carlyle S. Beals proposed in 1968 that the Nastapoka arc is possibly part of a Precambrian extraterrestrial meteorite impact structure that is comparable in size to the Mare Crisium on the Moon. In the same volume, Wilson evaluates Beals's interpretation and proposes an alternative hypothesis that the Nastapoka arc formed as the result of a continental-scale collision of pre-existing Archean continents and closure of an ancient ocean basin. In August 1972, Robert S. Dietz and J. Paul Barringer conducted an extensive search of much of the Nastapoka arc with First Nations and Inuit canoes and fishing boats in an investigation of its impact origin. They examined the abundant and extensive rock exposures that occur within the region of the Nastapoka arc and found no shatter cones, suevite-type or other unusual melt rocks, pseudotachylite or mylonite, radial faults or fractures, unusual injection breccias, or any other evidence of shock metamorphism.

A 1992 study by Goodings and Brockfield proposed that the preexisting structure of an older Archean impact structure might have been reactivated by and was modified by the Trans-Hudson orogeny to form the Nastapoka arc. The deformation accompanying the Trans-Hudson orogeny could have masked evidence of such an Archean impact.

Based on numerical modelling, regional geology, and lack of evidence for an Archean hypervelocity impact, the current, general consensus is that it is an arcuate boundary of tectonic origin between the Belcher Fold Belt and crystalline rocks of the Superior craton created during the Trans-Hudson orogeny about 2.0–1.8 billion years ago.

== See also ==
- Clearwater Lakes, a pair of confirmed impact craters 140 km inland
- List of possible impact structures on Earth
