= Clearwater River (Quebec) =

River in Quebec, Canada

Coordinates: 56°10′27.23″N 75°27′39.49″W

The Clearwater River (in French: Rivière à l'Eau Claire) is a river flowing on the east shore of Lake Guillaume-Delisle (formerly designated "Richmond Gulf"), which empties into the Hudson Bay. The "Clearwater River" is located in Nunavik, in the west of the Labrador peninsula, in the administrative region of Nord-du-Québec, in Quebec, in Canada. This river drains Clearwater Lake into Lac Guillaume-Delisle.

== Geography ==
The Clearwater River rises in Clearwater Lake (Lac à l'Eau Claire (Nord-du-Québec)). It flows west for about 70 km and empties into Lake Guillaume-Delisle. This body of water, more properly a gulf, is connected to Hudson Bay on its west side via a narrow channel about 5 km long called "Le Goulet", meaning narrows or bottleneck.

The watershed of the river covers 4766 km^{2}.

The gulf and Clearwater Lake are part of the Lakes Guillaume-Delisle-and-Lac à l'Eau Claire National Park. Covering an area of 15,549 km^{2}, the park was officially created in 2012, following an announcement by the Minister of Environment, Wildlife and Parks in Quebec.

== See also ==
- Lake Guillaume-Delisle
- Clearwater Lake
- Hudson Bay
