= Little Whale River =

Little Whale River Wâpamekustûss
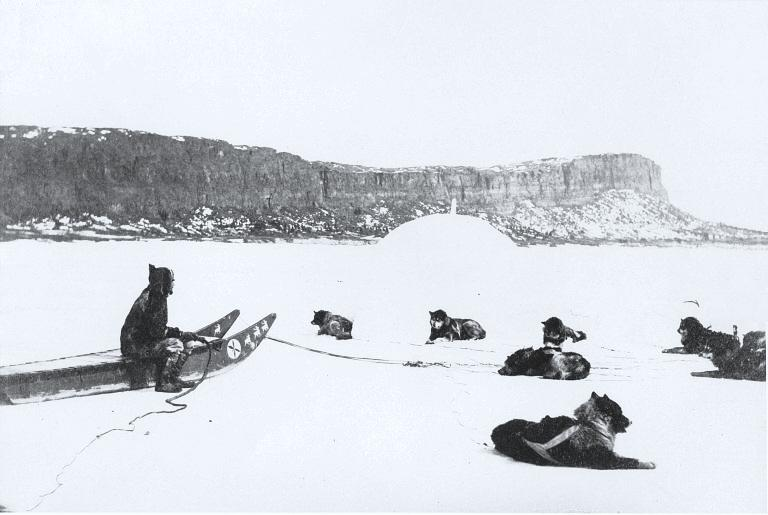

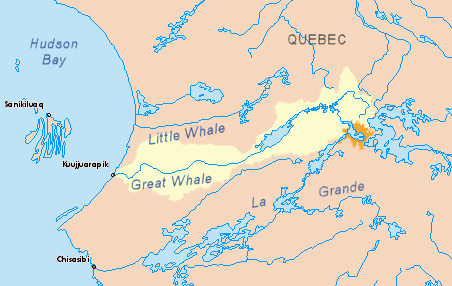
- The Little Whale is just north of the Great Whale River basin (in yellow)
- Native name: Petite rivière de la Baleine (French)

Location
- Country: Canada
- Province: Quebec
- Region: Nunavik

Physical characteristics
- Source: Unnamed
- Mouth: Hudson Bay
  - location: Point Qilalugarsiuvik
  - coordinates: 56°00′15″N 76°47′00″W
  - elevation: 0 m (0 ft)
- Length: 380 km (240 mi)
- Basin size: 15,900 km^{2} (6,100 sq mi)
- Discharge
  - average: 280 m^{3}/s (9,900 cu ft/s)

Basin features
- Tributaries
  - left: Boutin River

The Little Whale River (French: Petite rivière de la Baleine; Cree: Wâpamekustûss) is a river in Nunavik, Quebec, Canada. With an area of 15,900 square kilometres (6,100 sq mi), it is ranked as the 35th largest river basin in Quebec.

The Cree named a segment of the Little Whale River near its mouth as Wâpamekustus, which is similar to what Isbister noted in 1740. The Inuit call it Qilalugarsiuviup Kuunga, which means "river or place where beluga is hunted".

Its name has often been wrongly translated into French as Rivière de la Petite Baleine.

== History ==
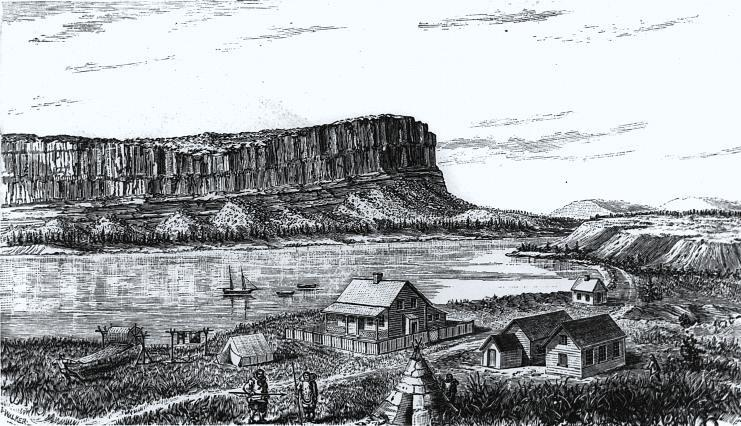
HBC Post, circa 1878

In the records of 1740 kept by Joseph Isbister of the Eastmain Post, there is reference to a river called Wapameg-Us-Sosh (meaning White Whale River), where a multitude of beluga is found. It mentions that the river is located a short distance south of the Gulph [sic] (that is Richmond Gulf or Lac Guillaume-Delisle in French).

The English name of the river was first recorded in 1744 in the logbooks of Hudson's Bay Company employees Thomas Mitchell and John Longland, while exploring the bay's coast. On July 29, Mitchell made mention of Little White Whale River.

Traces of copper were found on the Little Whale River in the mid 18th century. A house was built on that river for miners and a small whaling operation, but the mine produced nothing of value.

From 1853 to 1890, the Hudson's Bay Company operated a trading post, named after the river, at its mouth. Some time during this period, a group of Inuit came to the Little Whale River Post, found it occupied only by a boy, plundered the post and carried off the boy, who was later murdered. The post, now known as Jiaviniup Narsanga, has long been abandoned.

== See also ==
- Great Whale River - flowing parallel to the Little Whale River about 100 km to the south
- List of Quebec rivers
