= Tursujuq National Park =

National Park of Quebec, Canada

Coordinates: 56.35°N 75.00°W

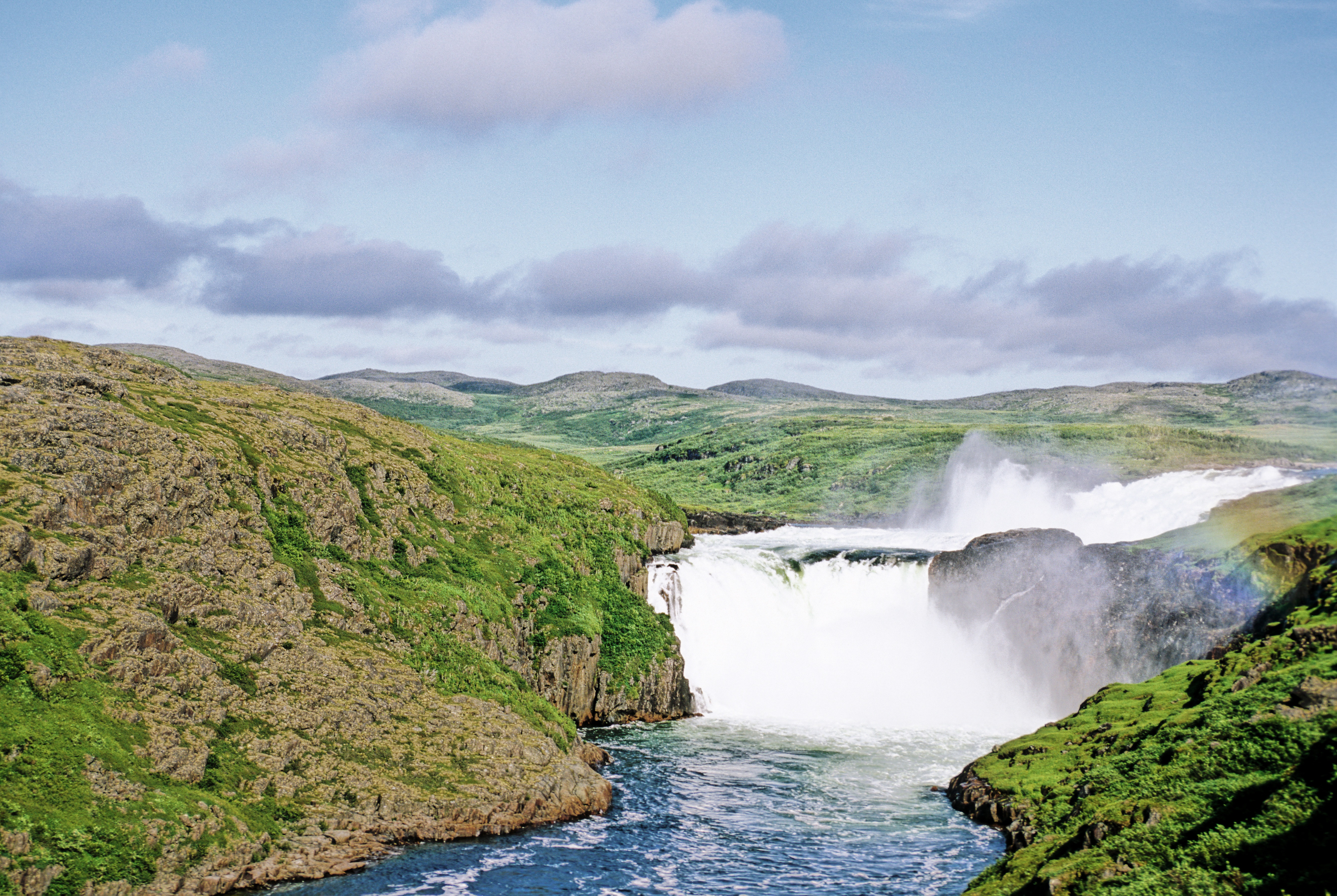
A waterfall on the Nastapoka River

Tursujuq National Park is a Provincial Park of Quebec, Canada. Its creation was announced by the Province of Quebec on December 14, 2012, and officially established on July 18, 2013. Located on the east side of Hudson Bay near the Inuit village of Umiujaq, the park is one of North America's largest, with an area of 26,106.7 km^{2} (6.45 million acres). It is managed by the Kativik Regional Government, which encompasses most of the Nunavik region of Quebec.

The Clearwater Lakes, created by twin earth impacts, lie within the park, as do Richmond Gulf and the watershed of the Nastapoka River. The river hosts a population of landlocked freshwater harbour seals and salmon, and its mouth is a sanctuary for beluga whales.

Tursujuq means "small big River" in Inuktitut and "River with Belugas" in Cree.

== See also ==
- List of protected areas of Quebec
