= Lake Tasiujaq =

Inland bay in Quebec, Canada

- Richmond Gulf / Lac Guillaume-Delisle
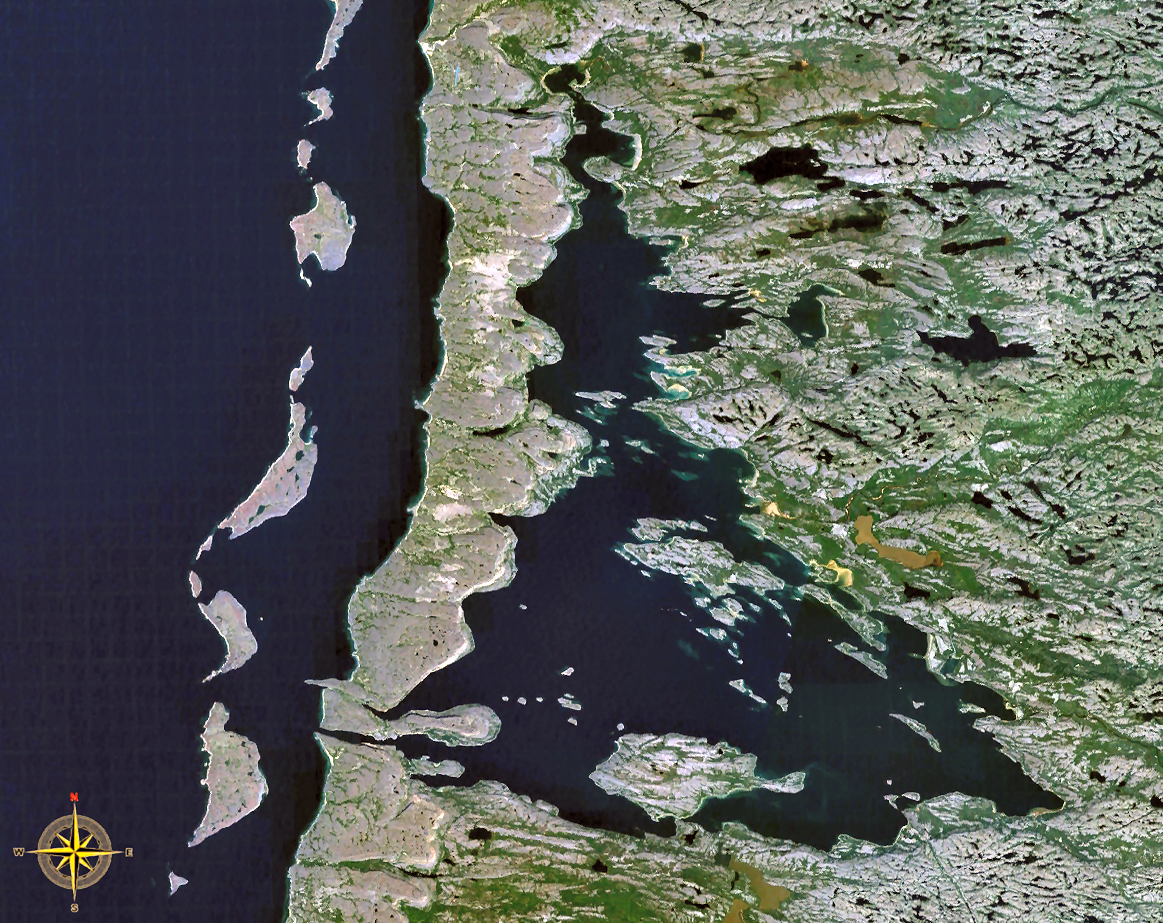
- Satellite view

- Location within Quebec
- Location: Hudson Bay, Nunavik, Quebec
- Coordinates: 56°14′58″N 76°17′39″W
- Primary inflows: Clearwater River
- Primary outflows: Le Goulet
- Basin countries: Canada
- Max. length: 61 km (38 mi)
- Max. width: 22 km (14 mi)
- Surface area: 712 km^{2} (275 sq mi)
- Settlements: Umiujaq

Lake Tasiujaq (French: lac Tasiujaq; Inuktitut: Tasiujaq (which resembles a lake)) is a large triangular-shaped inland bay located on east side of Hudson Bay just above 56th parallel north in Quebec, Canada. It was formerly known as Richmond Gulf in English and Lac Guillaume-Delisle in French.

In 2008, regional councillors asked the Commission de toponymie du Québec to rename Richmond Gulf as Lac Tasiujaq. The name was officially adopted on 26 February 2016.

A vast area surrounding the lake, Clearwater Lakes (Lacs à l'Eau-Claire), and Iberville Lake (Lac D'Iberville) was included in the Tursujuq National Park, officially established on July 18, 2013.

On the south shore, there are the remnants of an abandoned Hudson's Bay Company trading post, called Fort Richmond, which operated from 1750 to 1759 and from 1921 to 1927.

== Geography ==
The topography of Lake Tasuijaq is the consequence of two geological faults running parallel to the coast. The resulting dislocation has given rise to the cliffs that dominate the western shore of the lake.

The western shore is guarded by the steep ramparts of sedimentary rock that rise abruptly out of the brackish waters. This unusual coastal relief of asymmetrical hills are the Hudsonian Cuestas and the highest system of cuestas found in Quebec. There is only one narrow breach in these fortifications at the extreme southwest end, called "Le Goulet" (French meaning "narrows" or "bottleneck"), which is a cataclinal valley 5 kilometres (3.1 mi) long, 300 to 600 metres (980 to 1,970 ft) wide and fringed by cliffs 200 metres (660 ft) high. A large volume of water surges through it with the rise and fall of the tides, creating water level differences of about 0.5 metres (1.6 ft). Consequently, this passage does not freeze in the winter.

The eastern shore rises more gradually and is largely Canadian Shield rock, overlain in many places by basalt. Several large rivers enter Richmond Gulf in boisterous rapids or sheer falls (e.g. Clearwater River).

Point Pamiallualuk is a narrow spur of rock that juts out some 2 km into Hudson Bay, just north of Le Goulet. Here, the north-flowing tidal current of Hudson Bay collides with weaker counter-current to produce a lot of agitation, which is further enhanced by the strong wind.

== Name and history ==
In 1743 the Hudson's Bay Company ordered its post at Fort Albany, Ontario, to explore the whole east coast of Hudson Bay, an area rarely visited because it was barren and produced little fur. In 1744, Thomas Mitchell, captain of a HBC ship entered the lake and named it "Sir Atwell's Lake", most likely in honour of HBC Deputy Governor Sir Atwell Lake, whose surname "Lake" became a source of confusion. Mitchell also recorded that same year the Cree name "Winipeq" for this location. The map of William Coats (1749) identified the lake under the Cree name "Artiwinipeck" and in English as "Sir Atwell's Lake". Later on this body of water would be given several other names, particularly "Winipeke Bay", "Hazard Gulf", "Gulf of Richmond," and "Richmond Bay" until the Geography Commission of Canada accepted Richmond Gulf in 1905. The reason for this choice is not clear: it may refer to the Duke of Richmond or the name of Thomas Mitchell's small vessel. In 1962, the Quebec Government decided to give French names to places in the northern Quebec and changed the name to "Lac Guillaume-Delisle", in honour of renowned cartographer and First Royal Geographer of France, Guillaume Delisle (1675-1726).

In 1749, the HBC ordered Fort Albany to build a post on the east side of Hudson Bay. Since the loss of Fort Rupert, trade on the east side had been done by small ships from Fort Albany and most of it was confined to the forested country well south of Richmond Gulf. The reason for the new post is not clear but it may have been due to rumors of non-HBC traders planning to enter the Bay. In 1750 Captain Coates and John Potts built Fort Richmond on an island known as Factory Island off the south shore of the inlet. Since the area produced little fur, the post was closed in 1759.

Some time during this period, a group of Inuit came to the Little Whale River post, found it occupied only by a boy, plundered the post and carried off the boy. Fort Richmond responded by seizing two Inuit in the hope of exchanging them for the boy. In fact the boy had been murdered. Since the two sides did not know each other's languages the hostages may not have understood what was being done to them. The hostages grabbed two guns and used them as bludgeons against some HBC people. Since the HBC men knew that the guns were loaded they shot down the two Inuit. Historian Arthur Morton claims that this is the only case where the HBC shed native blood.

== Flora and fauna ==
The many rivers flowing into Lake Tasiujaq make its water brackish but a healthy habitat for brook trout and whitefish, beluga and seal. Many species of birds, such as common loons, eider ducks and peregrine falcons, find summer shelter and nest here.

There are few scattered black spruce and larch in the surrounding tundra. The area has a flora of more than 415 vascular plant species, of which 65% (271 species) can be found on the so-called Hybrid Archipelago within the Gulf.
