= Clearwater Lakes =

Lakes in northern Quebec, Canada

Clearwater Lakes Lac Wiyâshâkimî
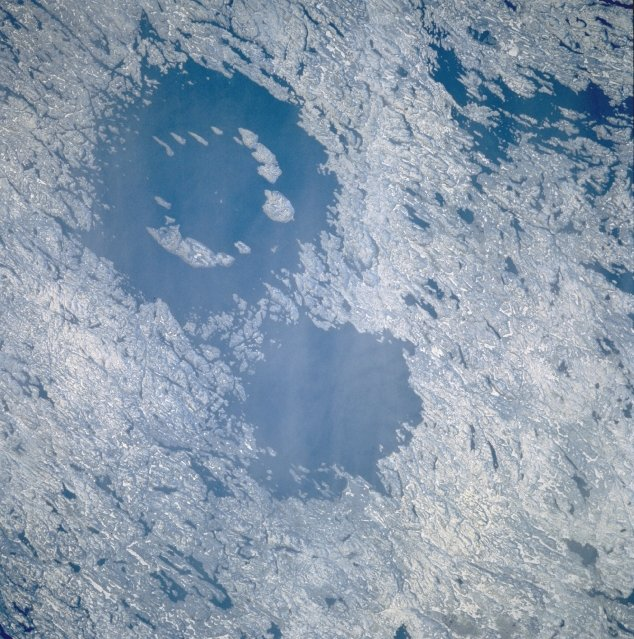
- Clearwater Lakes as seen from a Space Shuttle (North is top right)

- Location within Quebec
- Location: Baie-d'Hudson, Kativik, Quebec
- Coordinates: 56°08′N 74°18′W
- Type: Impact crater lake
- Primary outflows: Clearwater River
- Basin countries: Canada
- Surface area: 1,383 km^{2} (534 sq mi)
- Max. depth: 178 m (584 ft)
- Surface elevation: 241 m (791 ft)

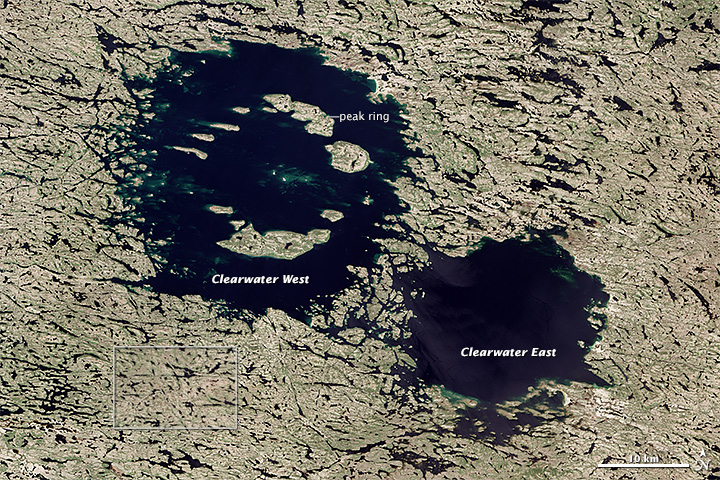
Clearwater Lakes, 2013 image by NASA Earth Observatory

The Lac Wiyâshâkimî (the official name, in French, formerly Lac à l'Eau Claire, a calque of the lake's name, Wiyâšâkamî, in Northern East Cree, changed form of wâšâkamî or wâšekamî in more southerly Cree dialects), also called the Clearwater Lakes in English and Allait Qasigialingat by the Inuit, (Note: The Inuit name contains a reference to the freshwater seals that inhabit the lake.) are a pair of annular lakes and impact structures on the Canadian Shield in Quebec, Canada, near Hudson Bay.

The lakes are actually a single body of water with a sprinkling of islands forming a "dotted line" between the eastern and western parts. Its name in Cree is due to the clear water it holds. There are actually 25 lakes with names that mean "Clearwater Lake" in the province (26 if the Petit lac à l'Eau Claire—the Small Clearwater Lake—is included). Collectively, this body of water is the largest, northernmost and the second-largest natural lake in Quebec after Lake Mistassini.

In 1896, the explorer and geologist Albert Peter Low, a member of the Geological Survey of Canada, provided a probable explanation for the lakes' descriptive Cree name by highlighting the extraordinary clarity and depth of their icy waters.

== Impact craters ==
The Clearwater Lakes occupy the near-circular depressions of two astroblemes – eroded impact craters. The eastern and western craters are 26 km (16 mi) and 36 km (22 mi) in diameter, respectively. Both craters were previously believed to have the same age, 290 ± 20 million years (Permian period), promoting the long-held idea that they formed simultaneously. According to this doublet impact crater theory initially proposed by Michael R. Dence and colleagues in 1965, the impactors may have been gravitationally bound as a binary asteroid, a suggestion also made by Thomas Wm. Hamilton in a 1978 letter to Sky & Telescope magazine in support of the then-controversial theory that asteroids may possess moons (such as, for example, asteroid 243 Ida with its satellite Dactyl).

Clearwater East and Clearwater West are both complex craters with distinct central peaks. These peaks are caused by the gravitational collapse of crater walls and subsequent rebound of the compressed crater floor. Lake water and sediments cover the central peak of Clearwater East, but bathymetric surveys of the lake floor and core drilling confirm the presence of a peak in its center.

=== Ordovician ===
Repeated ^{40}Ar/^{39}Ar dating of impact melt rocks from both impact craters suggests that Clearwater East has an age of approximately 460–470 million years, corresponding to the Middle Ordovician time period.

=== Permian ===
Clearwater West was formed 286.2 ± 2.6 million years ago, in the Early Permian. Both Clearwater impact structures also carry different geophysical (natural remanent magnetization) signatures and different geochemical fingerprints of the impacting meteorite in the impact melt of each crater.

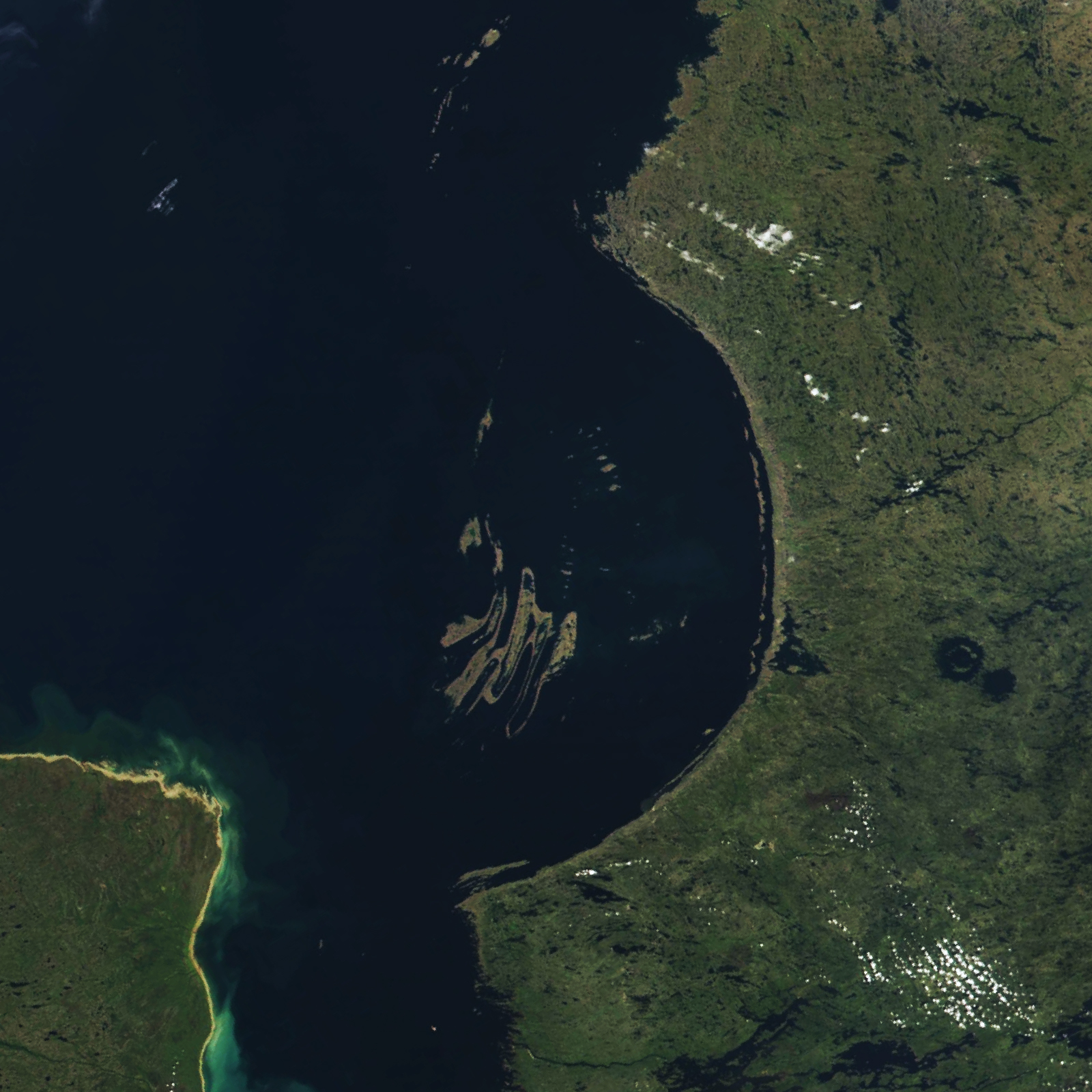
Satellite photograph of the Clearwater Lakes (centre right) relative to the Nastapoka Arc.

== Microclimate ==
Because of its size, Lac Wiyâshâkimî can affect the local climate, as attested to by the distribution of plant species. Although the lake's shorelines are populated mainly by boreal species, the flora of the central islands in the western basin of the lake is characteristically arctic, making the islands an arctic enclave.

== National park ==
A vast area surrounding the lakes, Richmond Gulf (Lac Guillaume-Delisle), and Iberville Lake (Lac D'Iberville) are part of the 15,549 km^{2} (6,004 sq mi) Tursujuq National Park, Quebec's largest national park, opened in 2012.

== See also ==
- Nastapoka arc, an embayment of Hudson Bay 140 km to the west, discredited as an impact crater
- Manicouagan Reservoir, a large Late Triassic epoch impact crater lake 650 km to the southeast
