= National Gallery of Canada =

National art museum in Ottawa, Canada

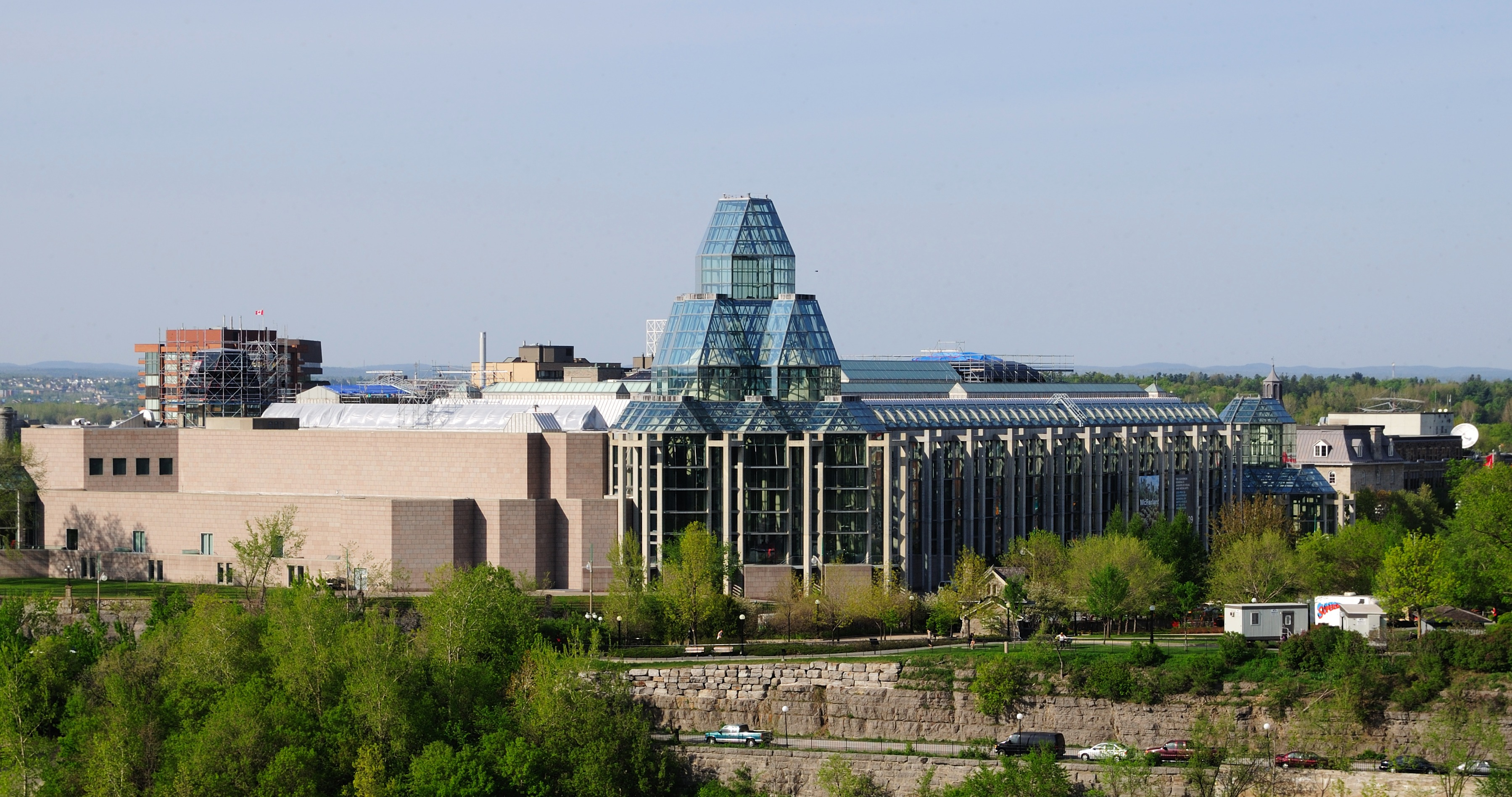
- National Gallery of Canada
- Interactive fullscreen map
- Established: 1880
- Location: 380 Sussex Drive, Ottawa; Ontario, Canada K1N 9N4
- Coordinates: 45°25′46″N 75°41′56″W
- Type: Art museum
- Collection size: 93,625
- Visitors: 385,576 (FY2017–18)
- Director: Jean-François Bélisle
- Architect: Moshe Safdie (1983)
- Public transit access: Rideau; 9 Rideau/Hurdman
- Website: www.gallery.ca

The National Gallery of Canada (French: Musée des beaux-arts du Canada), located in the capital city of Ottawa, Ontario, is Canada's national art museum. The museum's building takes up 46,621 square metres (501,820 sq ft), with 12,400 square metres (133,000 sq ft) of space used for exhibiting art. It is one of the largest art museums in North America by exhibition space.

The institution was established in 1880 at the Second Supreme Court of Canada building, and moved to the Victoria Memorial Museum building in 1911. In 1913, the Government of Canada passed the National Gallery Act, formally outlining the institution's mandate as a national art museum. The Gallery was moved to the Lorne Building in 1960.

In 1988, the Gallery was relocated to a new complex designed by Canadian-Israeli-American architect Moshe Safdie. The glass and granite building is on Sussex Drive, with a notable view of Canada's Parliament Buildings on Parliament Hill.

The Gallery's permanent collection includes more than 93,000 works by European, American, Asian, Canadian, and Indigenous artists. In addition to exhibiting works from its permanent collection, the Gallery also organizes and hosts a number of travelling exhibitions.

== History ==
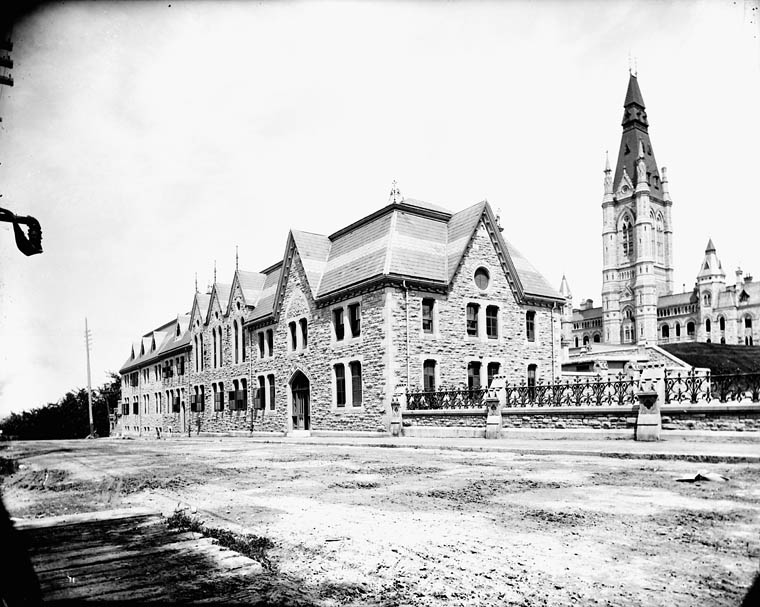
The National Gallery was housed in the Second Supreme Court of Canada building from 1882 to 1911.

The Gallery was first formed in 1880 by Canada's Governor General, John Campbell, 9th Duke of Argyll in conjunction with the establishment of the Royal Canadian Academy of Arts. In 1882, moved into its first home on Parliament Hill, housed in the Second Supreme Court of Canada building.

Eric Brown was named the first director in 1910. In 1911, the Gallery moved to the Victoria Memorial Museum building, sharing it with the National Museum of Natural Sciences. In 1913, the first National Gallery Act was passed, outlining the Gallery's mandate and resources. During the 1920s, the building was expanded. The art gallery was given four floors, and a separate entrance was created for the art museum. In addition, a firewall was built between the Natural Sciences Museum and the National Gallery. But, the Gallery was still in temporary space in the Victoria Memorial Museum building. Longterm plans were to move it to a new permanent location, with spaces dedicated to the viewing of art.

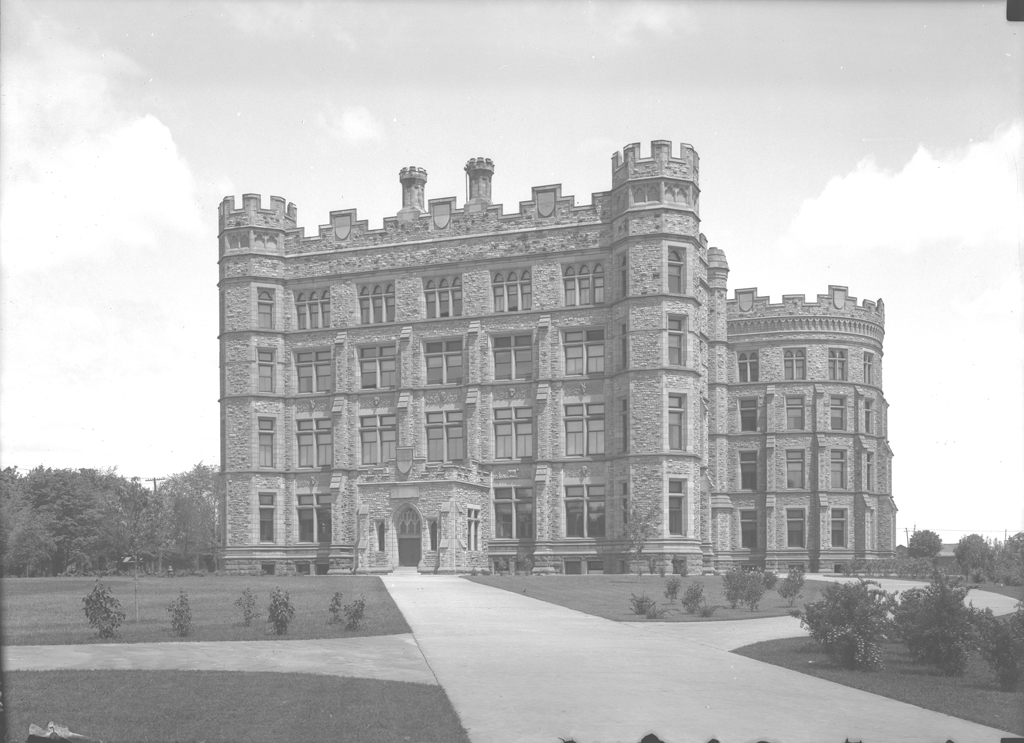
Victoria Memorial Museum building in 1911. The National Gallery of Canada was situated in the building from 1911 to 1960.

By the 1950s, the space in the Victoria Memorial Museum building had grown inadequate for the Gallery's collections. In 1952, the Gallery launched a design contest for architects to design a permanent home for the gallery. But the Gallery failed to garner support from the government of Louis St. Laurent, resulting in the Gallery having to abandon the winning bid.

To provide a workable compromise for the National Gallery, St. Laurent's government offered the National Gallery the eight-storey Lorne Building for its use. The National Gallery moved into the nondescript office building on Elgin Street. The Lorne Building has since been demolished and replaced by a 17-storey office building to house the Federal Finance Department.

In 1962, Charles Comfort, the Gallery's director, was criticized after half of the works on display at an exhibition for Walter Chrysler's European works were exposed as forgeries by American journalists. Comfort had allowed the Gallery to host the exhibition, despite being warned about the works by the director of the Montreal Museum of Fine Arts.

The National Museums of Canada Corporation (NMC) absorbed the National Gallery of Canada in 1968. During the 1970s, the NMC diverted funds from the National Gallery to form regional galleries. The Gallery completed renovations to the Lorne Building in 1976. By 1980, it had become apparent that the National Gallery would need to relocate, given the poor condition of the building, historical use of asbestos there, and inadequate exhibition areas that provided only enough space for two per cent of the collection to be exhibited at any given time.

After the Canada's Constitution was patriated in 1982, Prime Minister Pierre Trudeau announced a shift in policy focus towards the "creation of a nation," with priority given to the arts in an effort to enrich Canadian identity. In that same year, Minister of Communications Francis Fox declared the government's commitment to erect new permanent buildings for its national museums, including the National Gallery, and the Museum of Man within five years. The director of the National Gallery, Jean Sutherland Boggs, was chosen by Trudeau to oversee construction of the National Gallery and museums. The Gallery began construction for its permanent museum building on Sussex Drive in 1985, and was opened in May 1988.

The diversion of funds by the NMC to help fund regional museums was ended in 1982, and the National Museums of Canada formally dissolved in 1987. As a result of this dissolution, the National Gallery reacquired its institutional independence, along with the mandate and powers outlined in its formative legislative act prior to 1968.

The Canadian Museum of Contemporary Photography (CMCP), formerly the Stills Photography Division of the National Film Board of Canada, was an affiliated institution of the National Gallery, and was established in 1985. In 1988, the CMCP's administration was amalgamated with that of the National Gallery's. The CMCP later moved to its new location at 1 Rideau Canal, and continued to operate there until its closure in 2006. Its collection was later absorbed into the National Gallery's in 2009.

In December 2000, the National Gallery announced it suspected approximately 100 works from its collection was plunder stolen by the Nazis during the Second World War. The Gallery posted images of works suspected of being stolen art online, permitting its last legal owners to examine and possibly lay claim to the works. In 2006, the Gallery returned a painting by Édouard Vuillard that had been looted by the Nazis from Alfred Lindon in 1942, The Salon of Madame Aron, to Lindon's heirs.

In December 2009, the National Gallery of Canada and the Art Gallery of Alberta issued a joint press release announcing a three-year partnership, which saw the use of the Art Gallery of Alberta's galleries to exhibit works from the National Gallery's collection. The program was the first "satellite program" between the National Gallery of Canada, and another institution, with similar initiatives launched at other Canadian art galleries in the following years.

Marc Mayer was named the Gallery's director, succeeding Pierre Théberge, on 19 January 2009. On 19 April 2019, he was succeeded by Alexandra Suda, who was appointed the 11th Director and chief executive officer of the National Gallery of Canada. Under Sasha Suda, the Gallery underwent a major re-branding, dubbed Ankosé, to be more inclusive and work towards reconciliation. After only three years, Suda resigned. Angela Cassie was then appointed interim Director and CEO in July 2022. In 2023, Jean-François Bélisle was appointed the 12th director and chief executive officer.

== Building ==
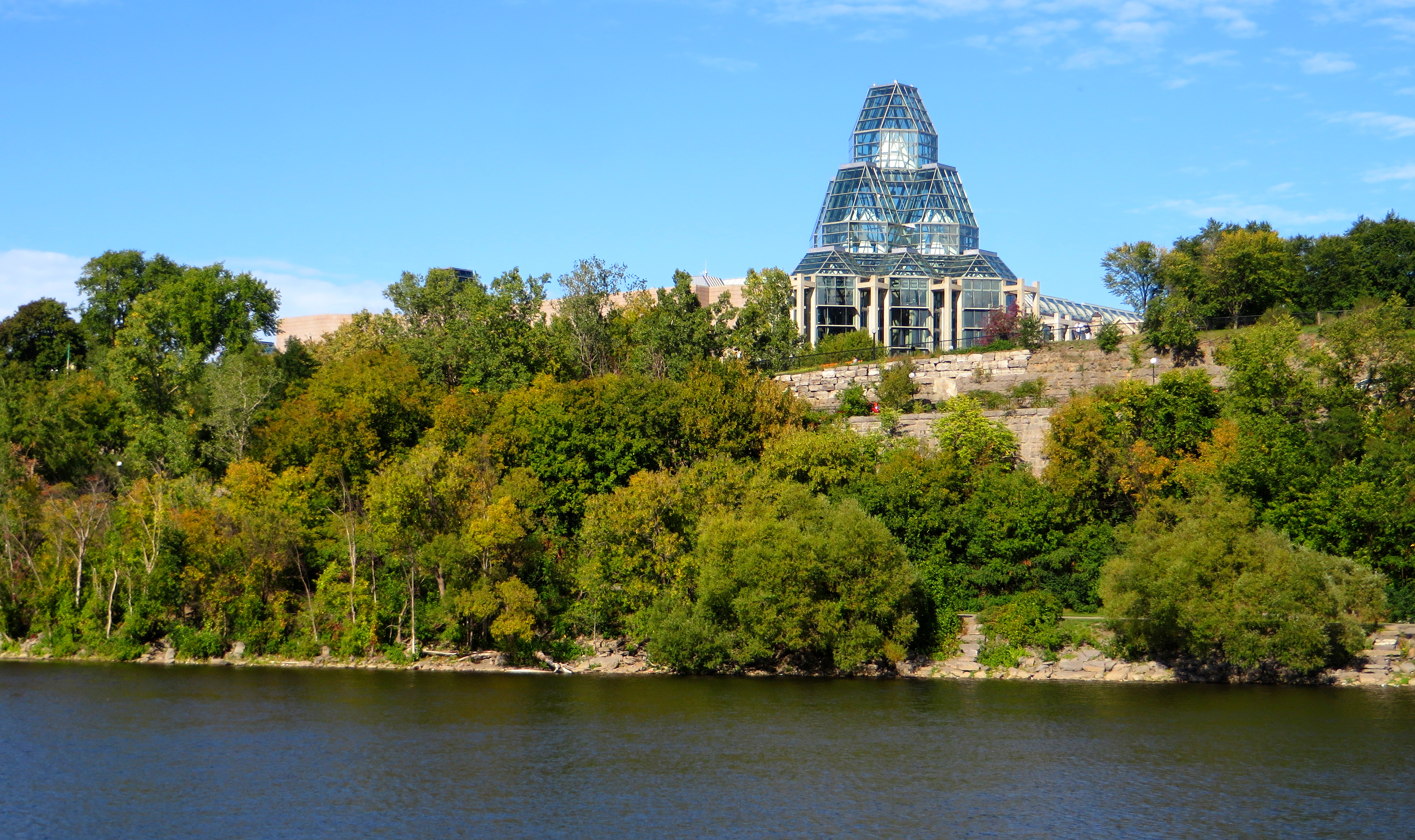
The building is adjacent to the Ottawa River.

The Gallery's present building was designed by Moshe Safdie & Associates, with construction beginning in 1985, and the building opening in 1988. The building has a total floor area of 46,621 square metres (501,820 sq ft). In 2000, the Royal Architectural Institute of Canada chose the National Gallery as one of the top 500 buildings produced in Canada during the last millennium. The National Gallery of Canada is housed in a building on Sussex Drive, adjacent to the ByWard Market district. The building is the fourth edifice to house the art museum.

An independent Crown corporation, the Canadian Museums Construction Corporation was established to build the Gallery, with a budget of C$185 million. Following the 1984 Canadian federal election, Prime Minister Brian Mulroney dissolved the corporation. However, because the groundwork for the building was already completed, Mulroney chose to continue funding construction for the Gallery, albeit at a reduced total budget of C$162 million.

=== Exterior ===
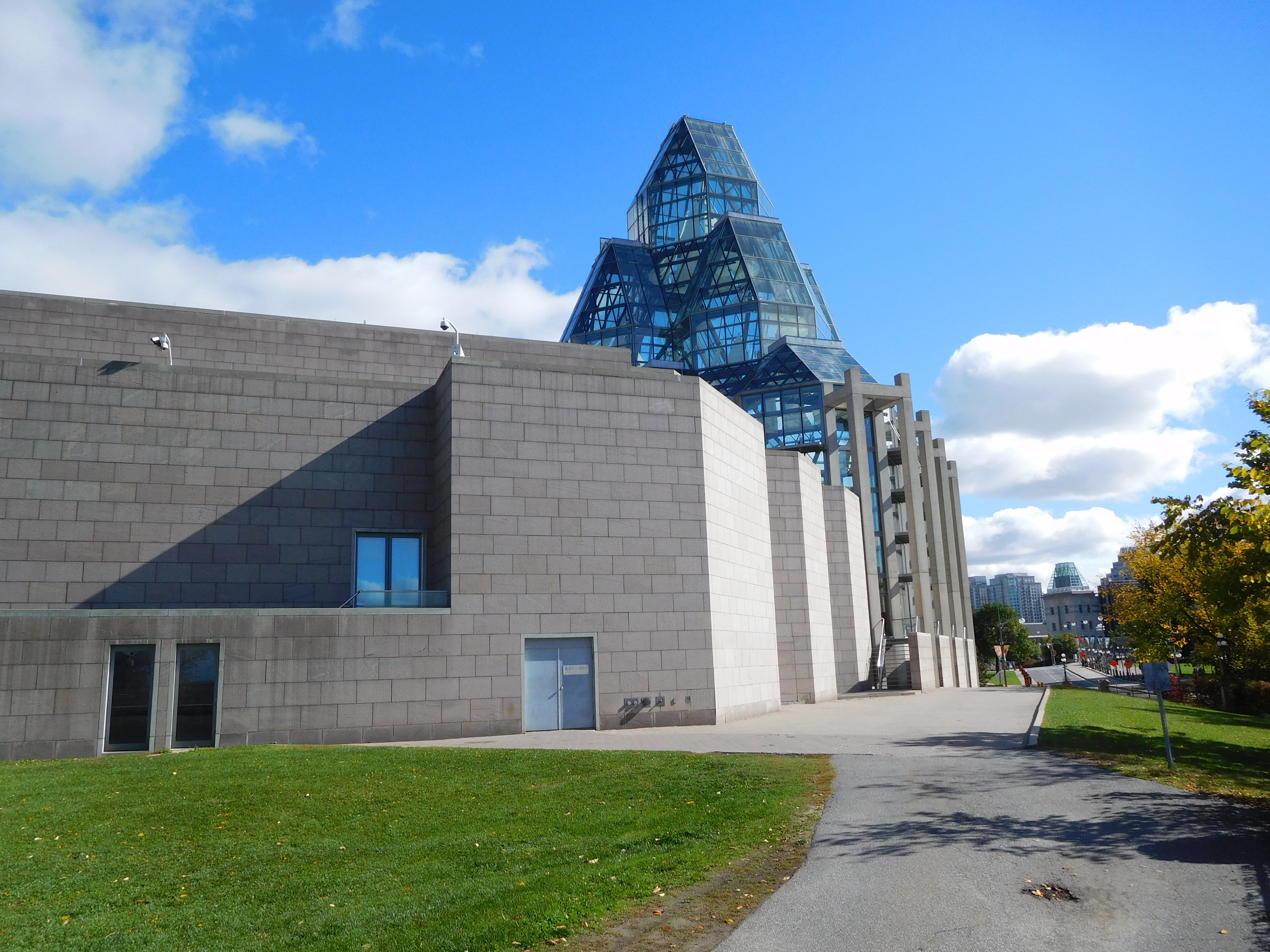
The pink-granite walls of the building's western façade

The building's northern, eastern, and western exterior facade is made up of pink-granite walls, or glass-windows. The southern exterior facade features an elongated glass wall, supported by concrete pylons grouped in fours. The profile of the southern facade was designed to mimic a cathedral, with the concrete pylons being used similarly to the flying buttresses found on Gothic cathedrals. The eastern portion of the building's southern facade transitions into a low-levelled crystalline glass cupola, which holds the museum's main entrance; and its western portion, which features a three-tiered glass cupola.

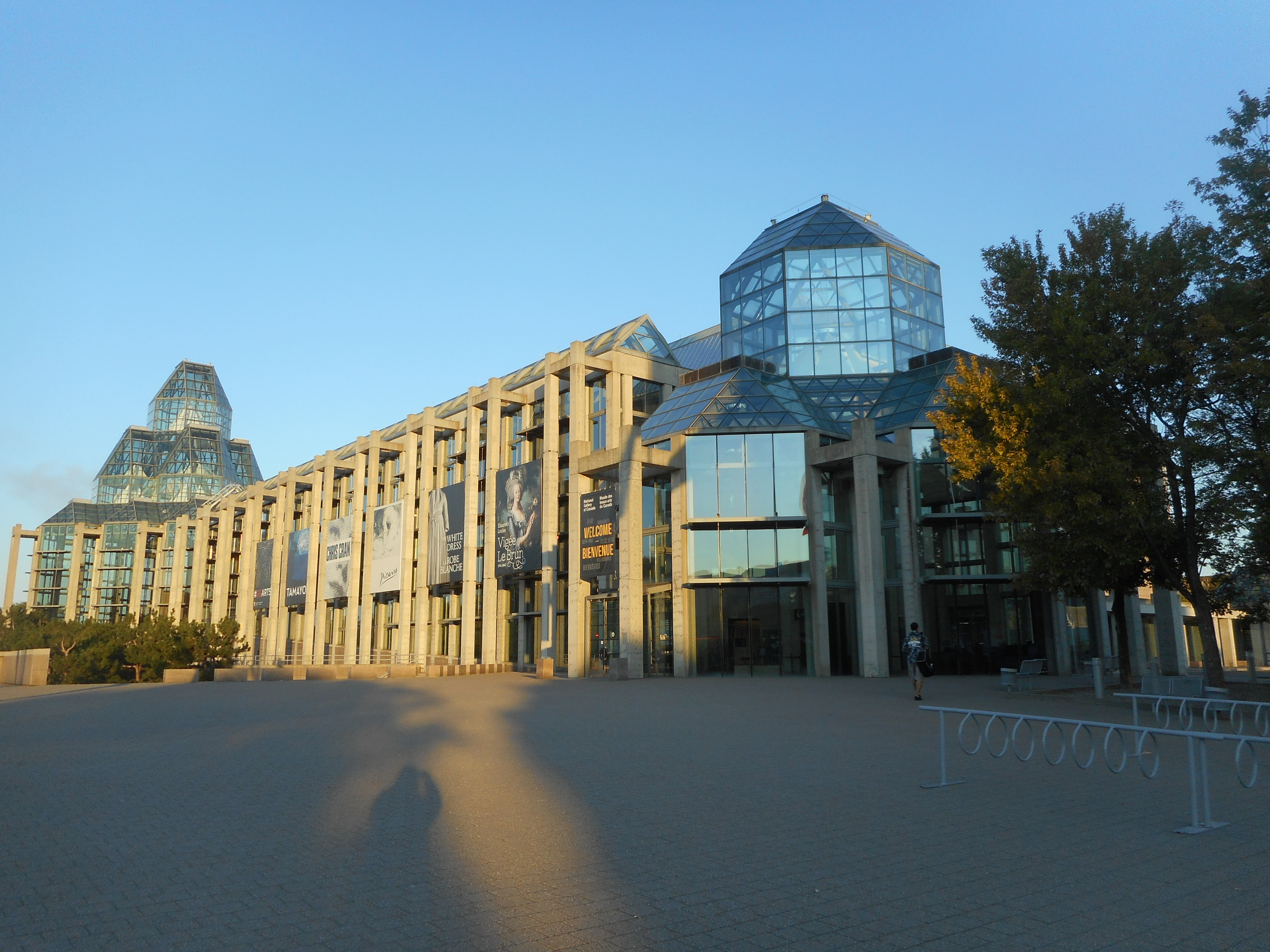
The building's southern facade, made up of a glass wall supported by concrete pylons, and a three-storey glass cupola in the southwest corner

The three-tiered glass cupola is formed out of rectangular glass and narrow steel supports. The second tier of the cupola is formed out of rectangles and equilateral triangles that are further subdivided into eight or twelve smaller equilateral triangles. All these glass pieces are joined by steel struts. The third tier of the cupola is formed with similar designs, although the triangular glass panes are isosceles triangles. The isosceles triangles converge upwards, with its apexes towards the centre. The building's three-tiered cupola is positioned in a manner in which the cupola would be flanked by the Peace Tower and the Library of Parliament to the west when approaching the museum from the east.

=== Interior ===
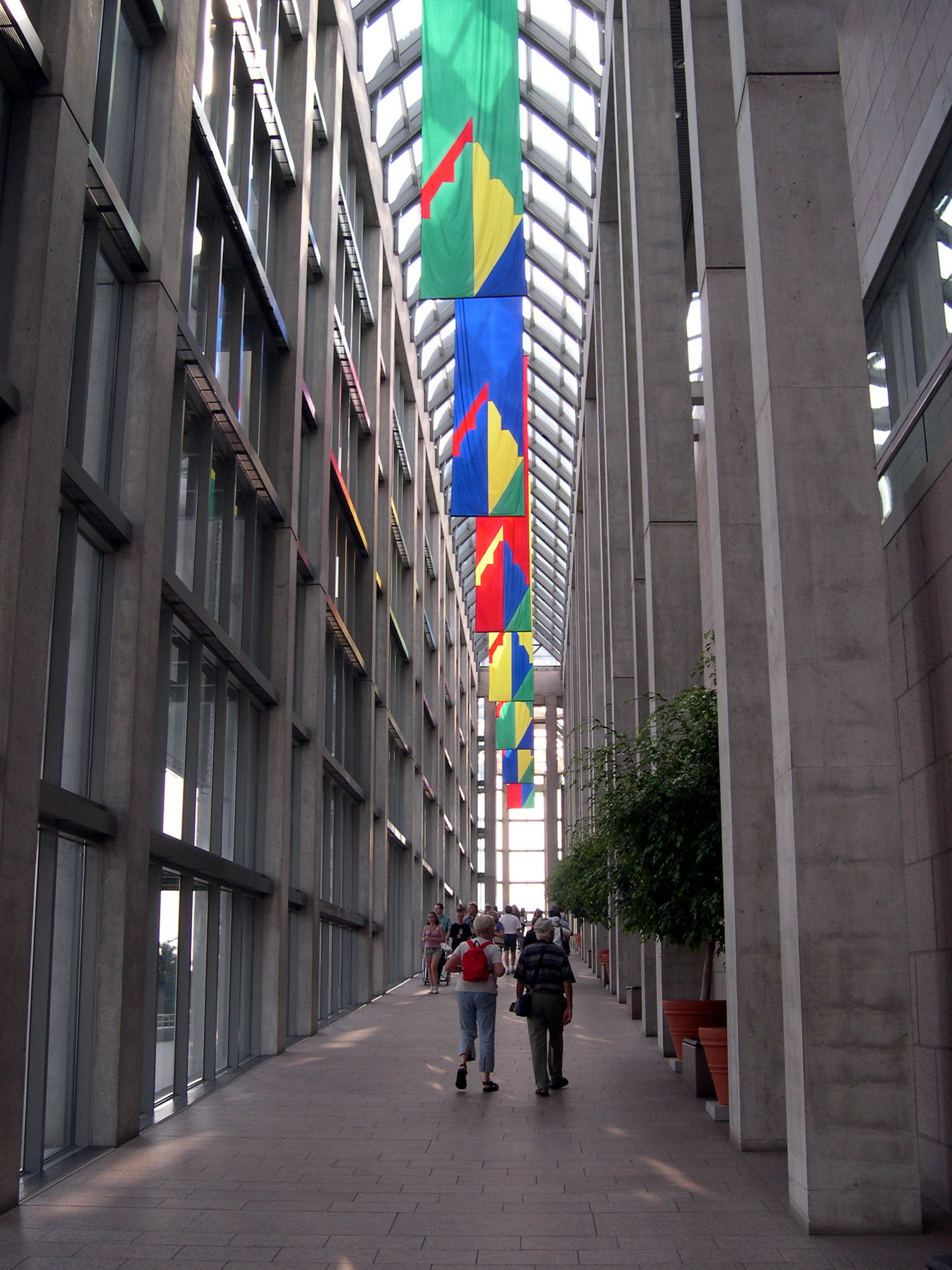
The building lobby's ramp towards the Great Hall

The interior entrance lobby is floored with pink-granite, and includes a straight four metres (13 ft) wide ramp which slopes upward towards the west. Safdie noted the importance of the ramp in his design, stating that one should "go through some kind of procession to make your way into something as important as the National Gallery," and that it gave the visitor the feeling of making an ascent to a ritual, a ceremony. The walls of the entrance lobby are lined with rectangular cut pink granite, excluding the southern wall, which is part of the glass-walled exterior facade. A glass and steel ceiling reminiscent of Gothic cathedral architecture, extends the entire way of the ramp. However, as opposed to most Gothic cathedrals, the ceiling has several concrete columns spaced out to support the roof. The summit of the ramp leads towards the Great Hall of the building, situated in the three-storey glass cupola.

The interior courtyard of the building includes the Taiga Garden. The garden was designed by Cornelia Oberlander, who modelled the painting Terre Sauvage by A. Y. Jackson; a painting in the National Gallery's permanent collection. The garden attempts to mimic the taiga landscape depicted in the painting, the Canadian Shield; although limestone is substituted in place of the granite typically found at the Canadian Shield.

== Collection ==
As of October 2018, the National Gallery of Canada's permanent collection holds more than 93,625 works, representing several artistic movements and eras in art history. The Gallery has a large and varied collection of paintings, works on paper, sculptures and photographs. The earliest works acquired by the museum were from Canadian artists, with Canadian art remaining the focus of the institution. However, its collection also includes several works from artists around the world. The Gallery's collection has been built up through purchases and donations. The Gallery organizes its own travelling exhibitions to exhibit its collection, travelling across Canada and abroad. The National Gallery is the largest lender of art in Canada, sending out approximately 800 works a year.

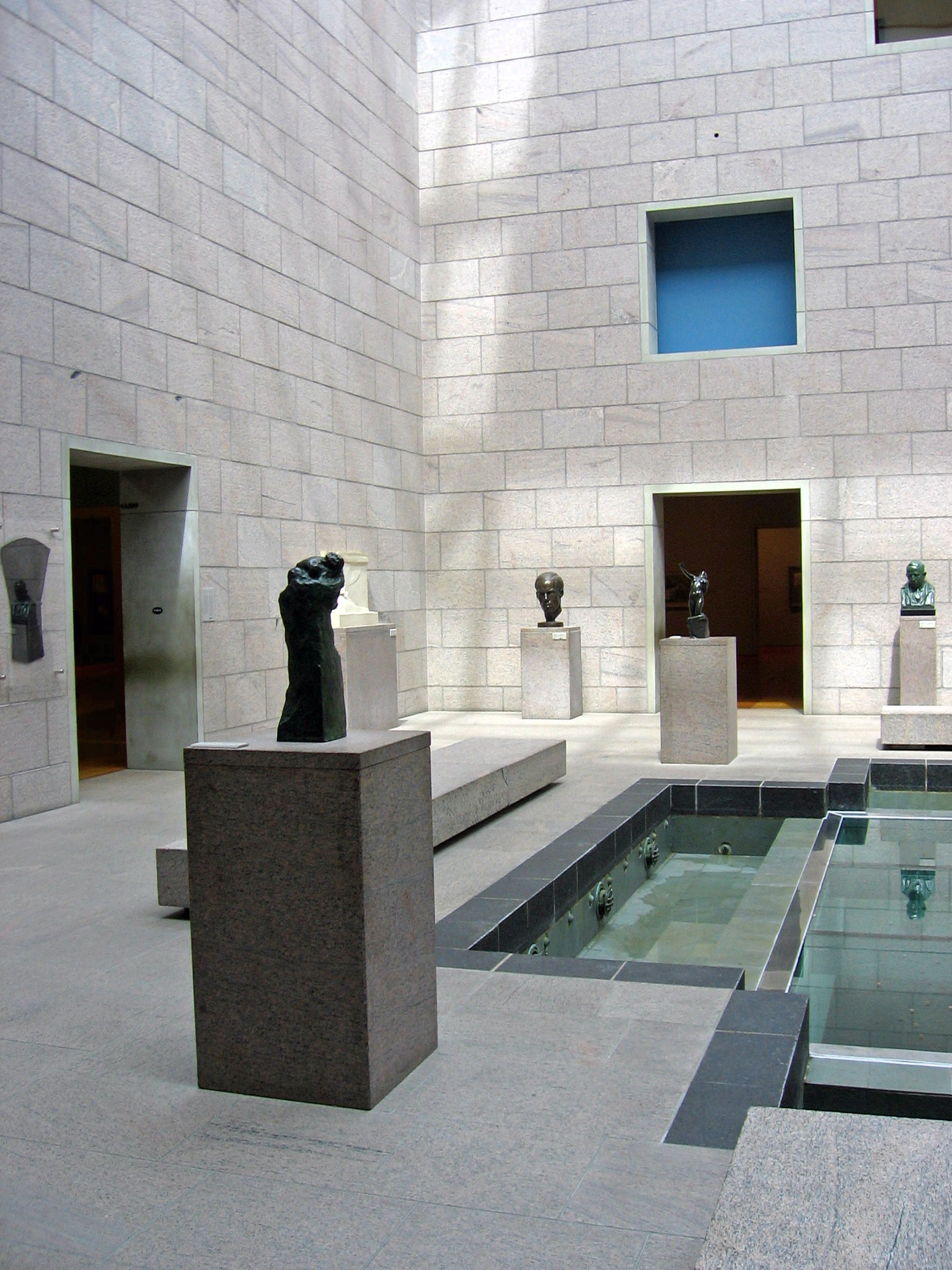
Sculptures on display in the museum's sculpture courtyard in 2005

The Gallery's prints and drawings collection includes 27,000 works on paper, dating from the 15th century to the present day. The prints and drawing collection includes 10,000 works on paper by Canadian artists; more than 800 of these prints and drawings being crafted by Inuit artists. The prints and drawing collection also includes 2,500 drawings and 10,000 prints by American, Asian, and European artists.

The Gallery also has approximately 400 works from Asian artists, dating from 200 CE to the 19th century. The Gallery's Asian collection began in the early 20th century, with a number of works originating from the collection of Nasli Heeramaneck. The Gallery also has a collection of photographs. A number of the photographs in the collection originated from the defunct Canadian Museum of Contemporary Photography.

Until the mid-1980s, the Gallery's mandate did not include collecting art by Indigenous peoples. This has been much critiqued, and led to important changes at the Gallery from the 1980s onwards. Despite a major re-hang in 2003 of the Canadian galleries to include Indigenous art for the first time, the Gallery continues to work towards more equitable representation of Indigenous art, particularly in its historical galleries.

The largest work in the Gallery is the entire interior of the Rideau Street Chapel, which formed part of the Convent of Our Lady Sacred Heart, The interior decorations of the Rideau Street Chapel were designed by Georges Couillon in 1887. The chapel interior was acquired by the Gallery in 1972, when the convent was slated for demolition. The 1,123-piece interior was dismantled, stored and reconstructed within the Gallery as a work of art in 1988.

=== Canadian and Indigenous works ===
The Gallery's Canadian collection includes works dating from the 18th century New France, to the 1990s. The collection includes paintings from pre-Confederation; abstract paintings and other postwar art; and the Henry Birks Collection of Canadian Silver. Early pre-Confederation paintings were among the first items in the Canadian collections, with the National Gallery's earliest works originating from Canadian artists at the Royal Canadian Academy of Arts.

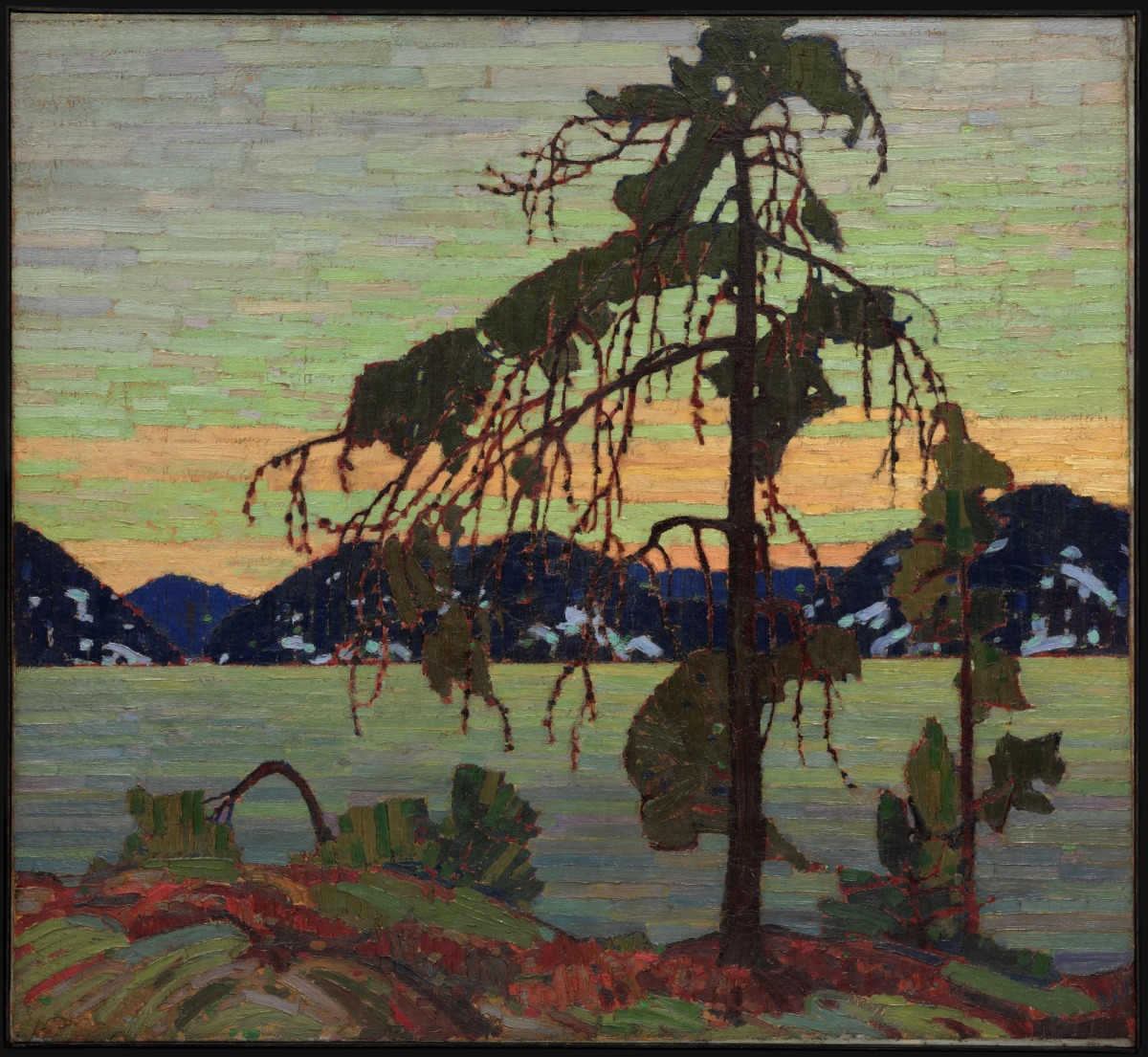
The Jack Pine by Tom Thomson. The Canadian collection includes a number of works by Thomson.

The Gallery's Canadian collection holds a large number of works by the Group of Seven. The Gallery also holds a large collection of works by Tom Thomson, with The Jack Pine added to its collection in 1918. The Gallery also holds the largest collection of works by Alex Colville. Other artists featured in the collection include William Berczy, Jack Bush, Paul-Émile Borduas, Emily Carr, Robert Field, Vera Frenkel, Theophile Hamel, Joseph Légaré, Cornelius Krieghoff, Fernand Leduc, Alexandra Luke, Ken Lum, James Wilson Morrice, John O'Brien, Antoine Plamondon, William Raphael, Jean-Paul Riopelle, William Ronald, Michael Snow, Lisa Steele, Jeff Wall, Joyce Wieland, Paul Wong, and members of the Regina Five.

In commemoration of the 150th anniversary of Canada in 2017, the Gallery undertook a C$7.4 million renovation to open the Canadian and Indigenous Art: From Time Immemorial to 1967 gallery. This gallery displays the progression of Canadian art and history, exhibiting Canadian and Indigenous works side by side. These works are exhibited in a manner which examines the intertwined relations between the two groups of people.

The Indigenous collection includes works by Indigenous artists around the world, although it has an emphasis on works by the Indigenous peoples of Canada. The Gallery collection acquired its first works by First Nations and Metis artists in the early 20th century. However, the makers of these works were often not acknowledged as Indigenous, because the Gallery's mandate did not include the collection of art by Indigenous peoples until the 1980s. The Gallery acquired its first Inuit works in 1956, crafted by artists in Nunavik. The Gallery's acquisition of Inuit works, at a time when it was not actively collecting art by other Indigenous peoples, is related to the Government's promotion of Inuit art to create jobs in the North and to assert Canadian sovereignty there. In 1979, Henry Birks bequeathed a large collection to NGC consisting primarily of Quebecois pre-confederation silver; this bequest of more than 12,000 objects included around 16 works by Indigenous artists. In 1989 and 1992, the Department of Indian Affairs and Northern Development bequeathed 570 works by Inuit artists.

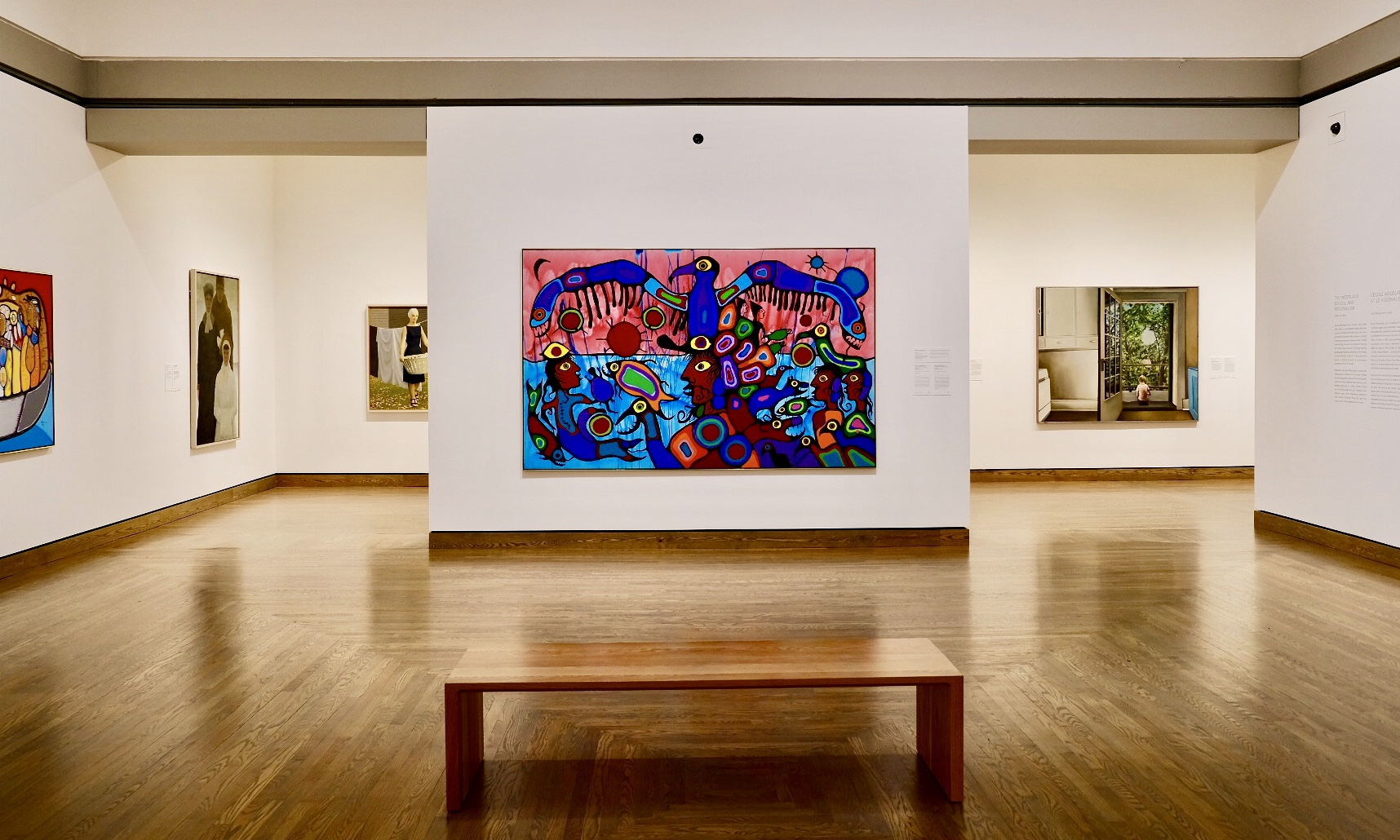
Artist and Shaman between Two Worlds by Norval Morrisseau on display at the museum

A number of Indigenous artists whose works are featured in the collection include Kenojuak Ashevak, Kiugak Ashoona, Qaqaq Ashoona, Carl Beam, Faye HeavyShield, Osuitok Ipeelee, Rita Letendre, Norval Morrisseau, Shelley Niro, David Ruben Piqtoukun, Abraham Anghik Ruben, Lucy Tasseor Tutsweetok, Jeffrey Thomas, John Tiktak, and Lawrence Paul Yuxweluptun.

=== Contemporary ===
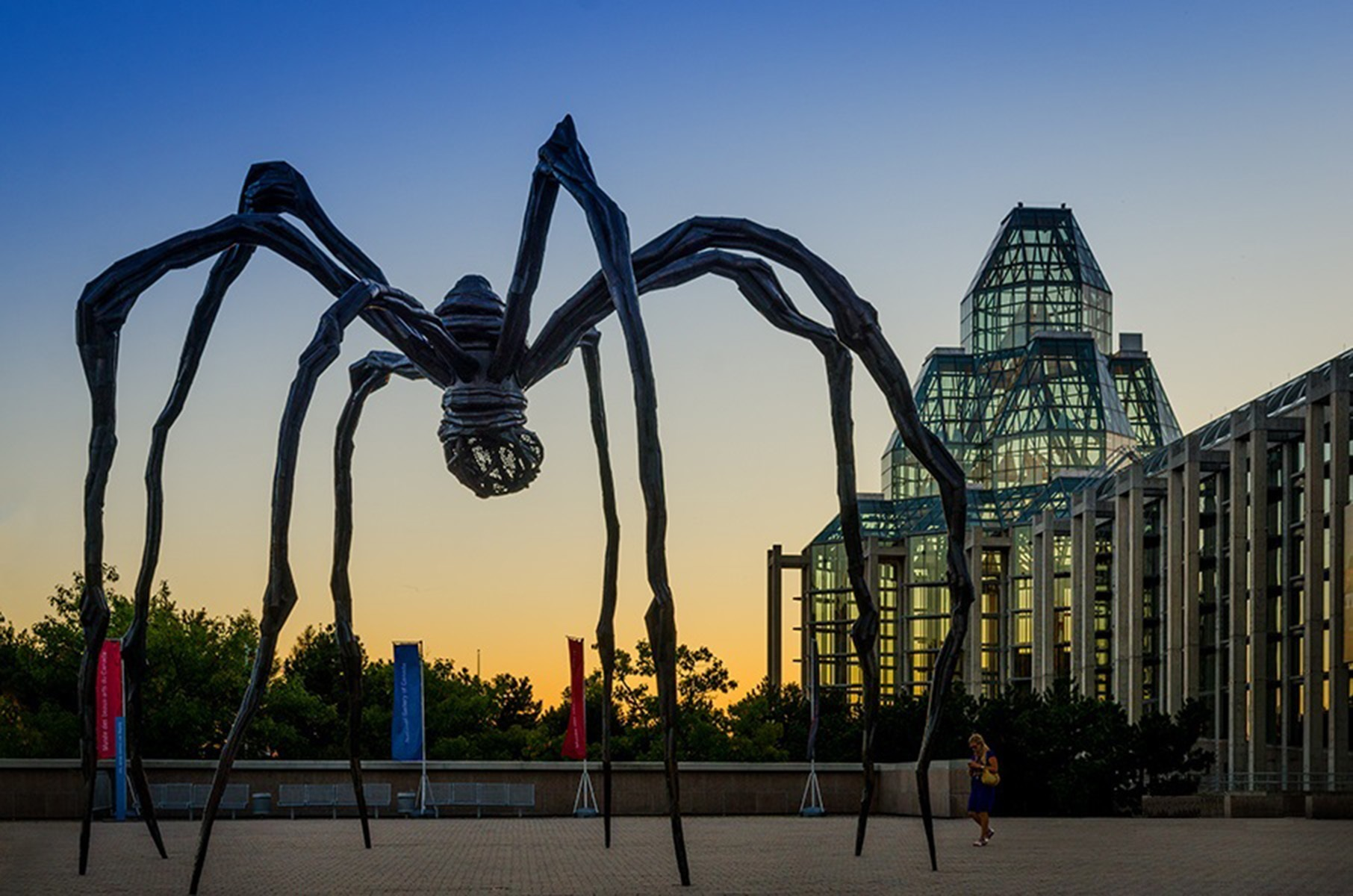
Maman by Louise Bourgeois, displayed outside the museum

The Gallery's contemporary collection includes 1,500 works from artists since the 1990s. The collection features a number of works from Canada and its Indigenous artists. The first Indigenous Canadian contemporary artwork acquired by the National Gallery was purchased in 1987, a piece called The North American Iceberg (1985) by Ojibwe artist Carl Beam. In 2017, Bob Rennie donated a contemporary art collection to the National Gallery in honour of Canada' 150th anniversary. The collection includes 197 paintings, sculptures, and mixed-media pieces with most of it originating from Vancouver-based artists including Geoffrey Farmer, Rodney Graham, Brian Jungen, and Ian Wallace. The Rennie collection also includes some international contemporary works, including from Doris Salcedo.

In 1990 the Gallery bought Barnett Newman's Voice of Fire for $1.8 million, igniting a storm of controversy. However, since that time its value has appreciated to approximately C$40 million as of 2014. In 1999, the Gallery acquired a sculpture of a giant spider, Maman, by Louise Bourgeois for a cost of C$3.2 million. The sculpture was installed on the plaza in front of the Gallery. In 2011 the Gallery installed Canadian sculptor Joe Fafard's Running Horses next to the Sussex Drive entrance, and American artist Roxy Paine's stainless steel sculpture One Hundred Foot Line at Kìwekì Point behind the gallery. Other contemporary artists whose works are featured in the National Gallery's collection include David Altmejd, Lee Bul, Janet Cardiff, Bharti Kher, Christian Marclay, Elizabeth McIntosh, Chris Ofili, Paine, Ugo Rondinone, and Joanne Tod.

=== European, American, and Asian ===
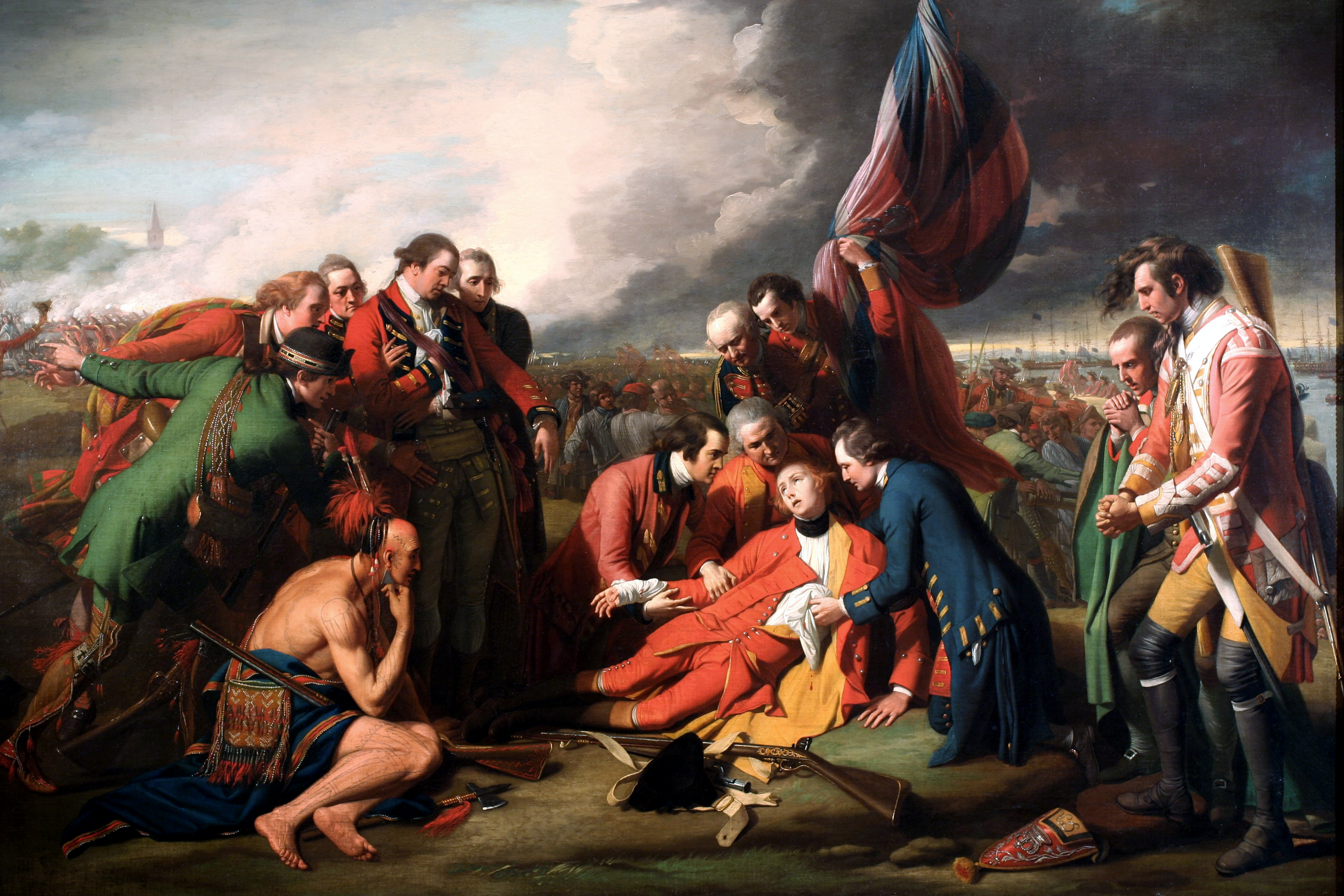
The Death of General Wolfe by Benjamin West. The painting is part of the Gallery's collection.

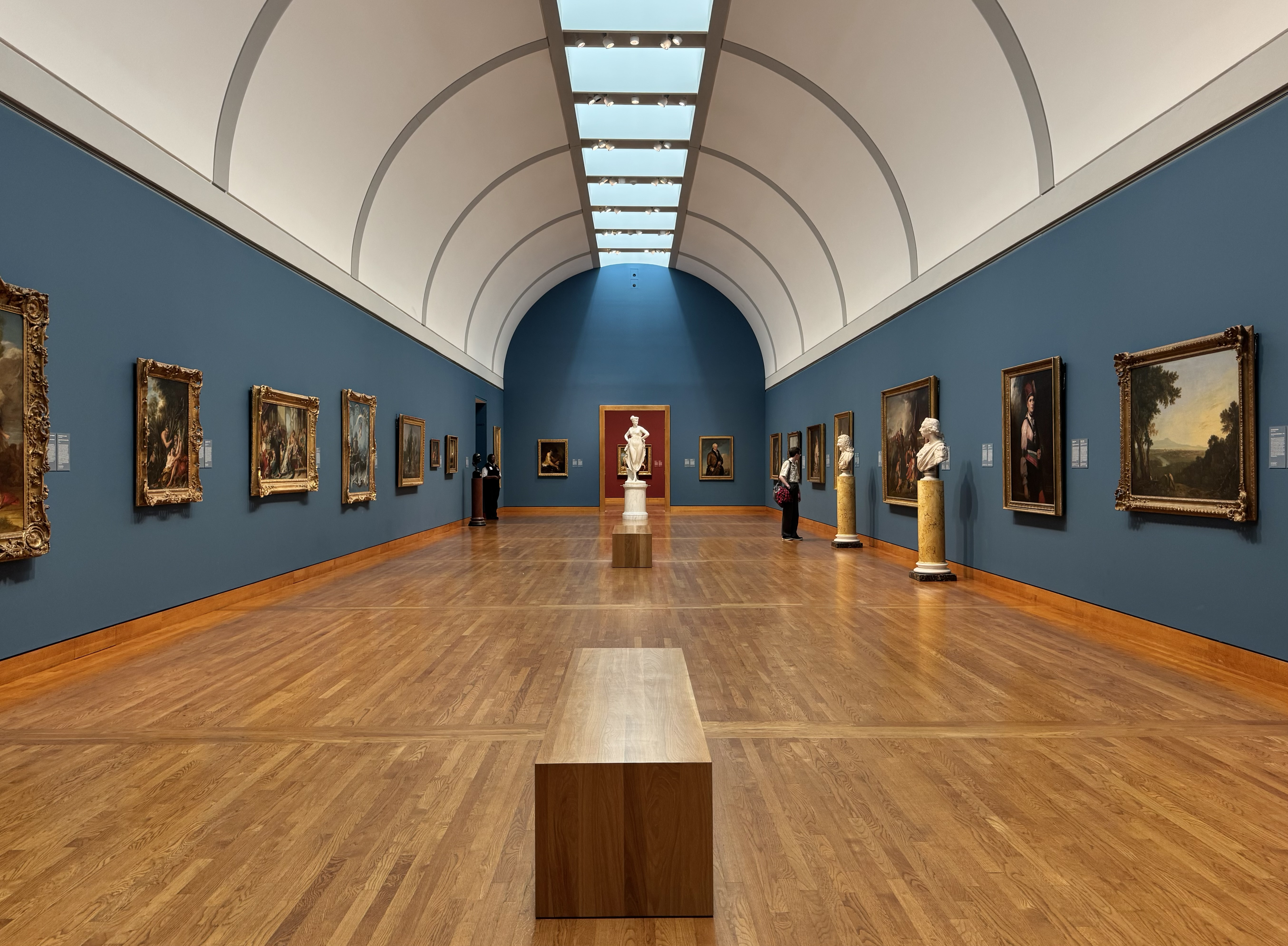
A room in the European art collection.

The European, American, and Asian collection area includes most of the Gallery's works by non-Canadian artists. The Gallery acquired its first European work in 1907: the painting Ignatius Sancho by Thomas Gainsborough. Conversely, the Gallery did not begin to develop its collection of American art until the 1970s.

The Gallery's collection includes American and European works dating from the Renaissance through the 20th century. In addition to Western art, the collection also has 400 works from India, Nepal, and Tibet.

The Gallery's European collection has since expanded either through acquisitions or gifts. Such works include La Tour Eiffel by Marc Chagall, acquired by the Gallery in 1956 for $C16,000. In 2018, the Gallery planned to sell the work to fund other acquisitions, but abandoned those plans after the decision was found to be unpopular with the public. In 2005, the Gallery acquired a painting by Italian Renaissance painter Francesco Salviati for $4.5 million. In 2018, the Gallery acquired The Partie Carée by James Tissot from the collection of David R. Graham, putting it on display in December 2018. It is the third work by Tissot to be acquired by the museum since 1921. Other works from the collection include The Death of General Wolfe by Anglo-American artist Benjamin West. Other artists featured in the museum's European collection includes Alejo Fernández, Vilhelm Hammershøi, Gustav Klimt, Élisabeth Vigée Le Brun, Henri Matisse, Charles Meynier, Claude Monet, Rembrandt, and Vincent van Gogh.

== Library and archives ==
The library and archives of the National Gallery of Canada hold an extensive collection of literature on Canadian art. The library and archives was established alongside the Gallery in 1880, and contains documents on western art from the Late Middle Ages to the present day. The collection includes 275,000 books, exhibition catalogues, and periodicals; 76,000 documentation files; and 95,000 microforms. The archives serves as the institutional archive for the Gallery.

The library and archives' special collections includes over 50,000 auction catalogues, in addition to 182,000 slides and 360,000 research photographs. The Library and Archives' Exceptional Materials and Notable Subject Collections contains a number of rare imprints, books, and bookplates on Canadian artists, as well as items relating to historians of Canadian art.

== Management ==
The federal government assumed responsibility for the Gallery in 1913, with the enactment of the National Gallery of Canada Act. The Gallery became a Crown corporation on 1 July 1990 with the proclamation of the Museums Act. The Museums Act serves as the museum's governing legislation. It empowers a board of trustees to serve as the Gallery's governing body, with the board, through the Chair, being accountable to the Minister of Canadian Heritage, who is ultimately responsible for the Museum. The Director and CEO is charged with the day-to-day management of the Gallery.

The Gallery is affiliated with several associations, including the Canadian Museums Association, the Ontario Association of Art Galleries, the Canadian Heritage Information Network, and the Virtual Museum of Canada.

=== Directors ===
The following is a list of directors of the National Gallery of Canada:

- Eric Brown (1910–1939)
- Harry Orr McCurry (1939–1955)
- Alan Jarvis (1955–1959)
- Charles Comfort (1960–1965)
- Jean Sutherland Boggs (1966–1976)
- Hsio-yen Shih (1977–1981)
- Joseph Martin (1983–1987) (Note: Martin was named the "acting director" of the institution since 1981, although he was not conferred as the institution's formal director until August 1983.)
- Shirley Thomson (1987–1997)
- Pierre Théberge (1998–2008)
- Marc Mayer (2009–2019)
- Alexandra Sasha Suda (2019–2022)
- Angela Cassie (interim 2022–2023)
- Jean-François Bélisle (2023– )

== Selected works ==
=== Canadian collection ===
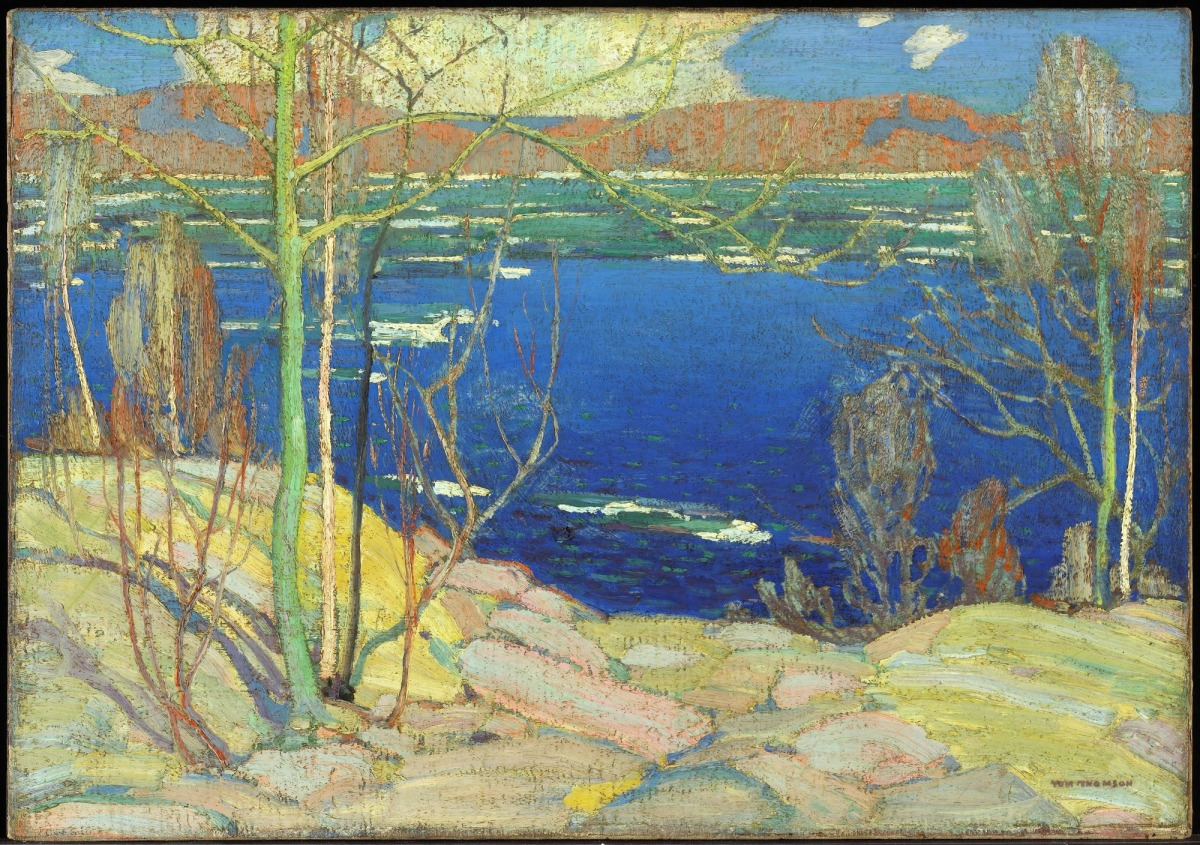
Tom Thomson, Spring Ice, 1915–16

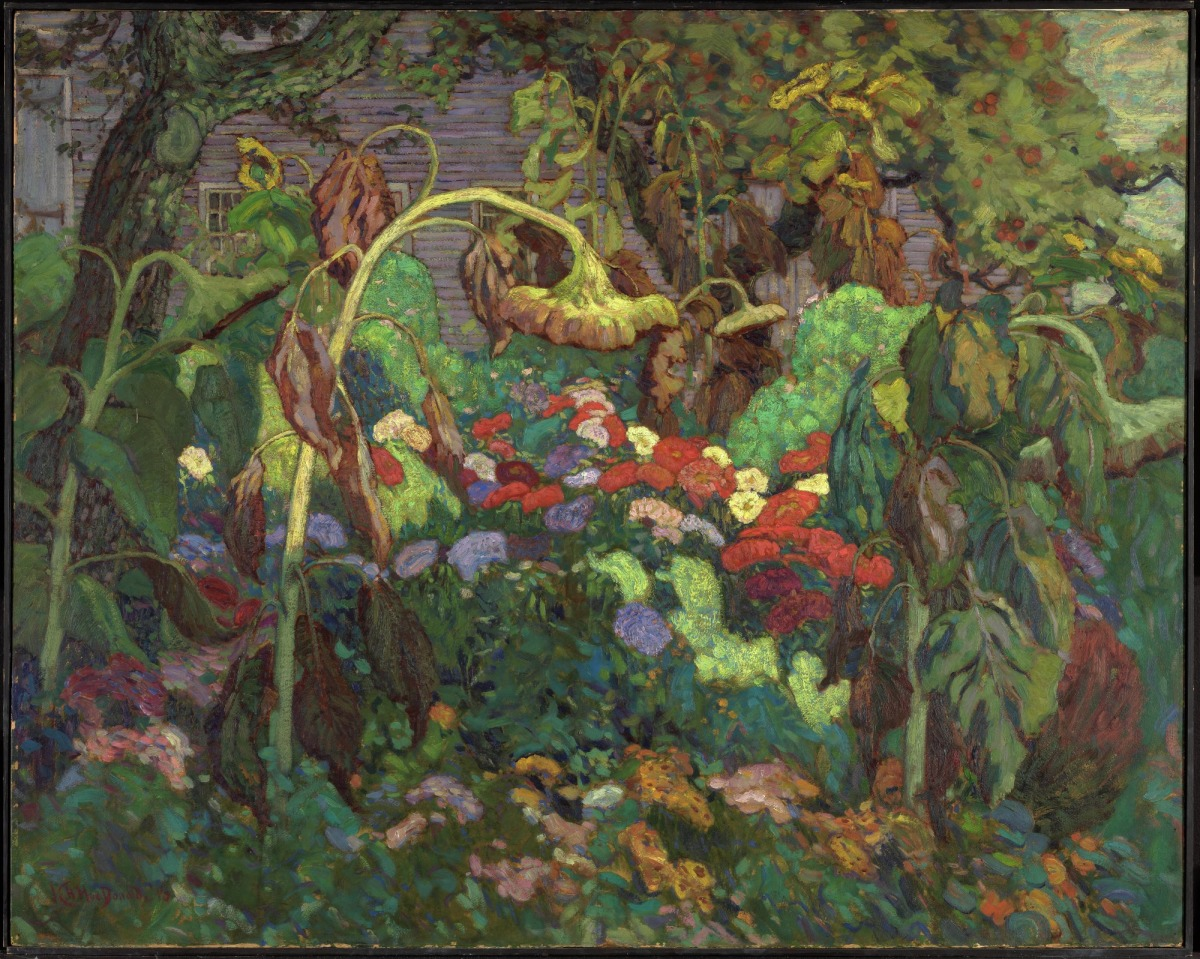
J. E. H. MacDonald, The Tangled Garden, 1916

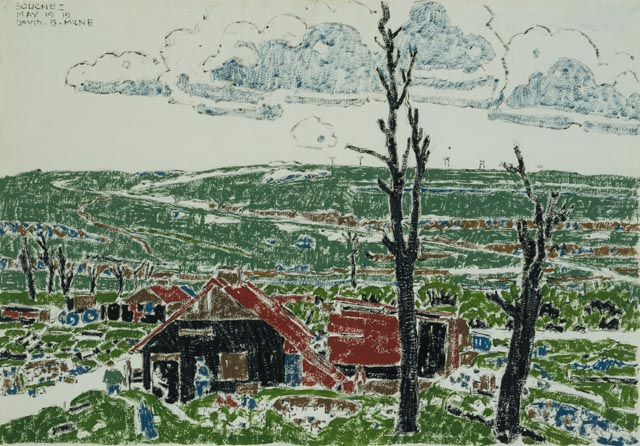
David Milne, Vimy Ridge from Souchez, Estaminet among the Ruins, 1919

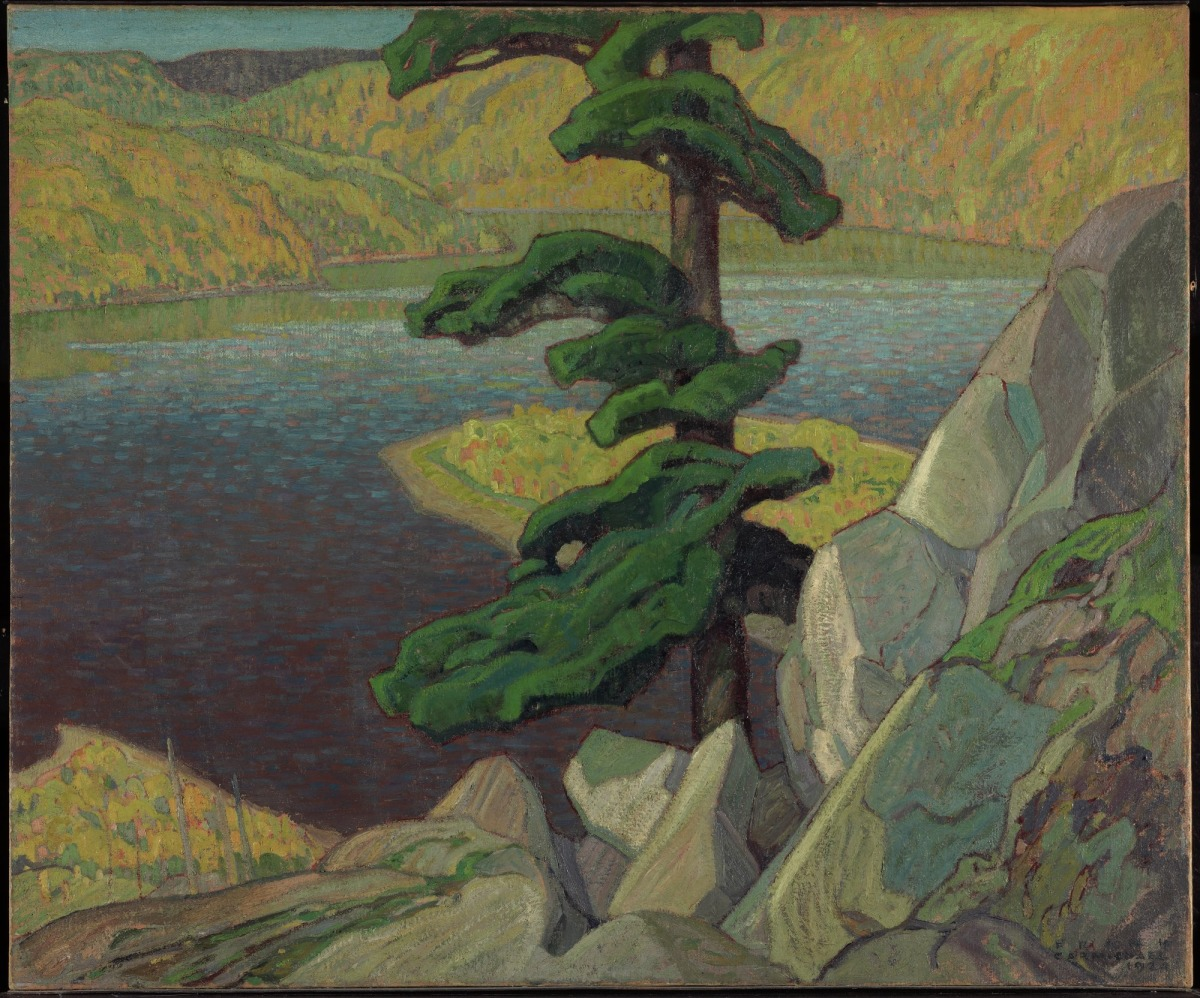
Franklin Carmichael, The Upper Ottawa, near Mattawa, 1924

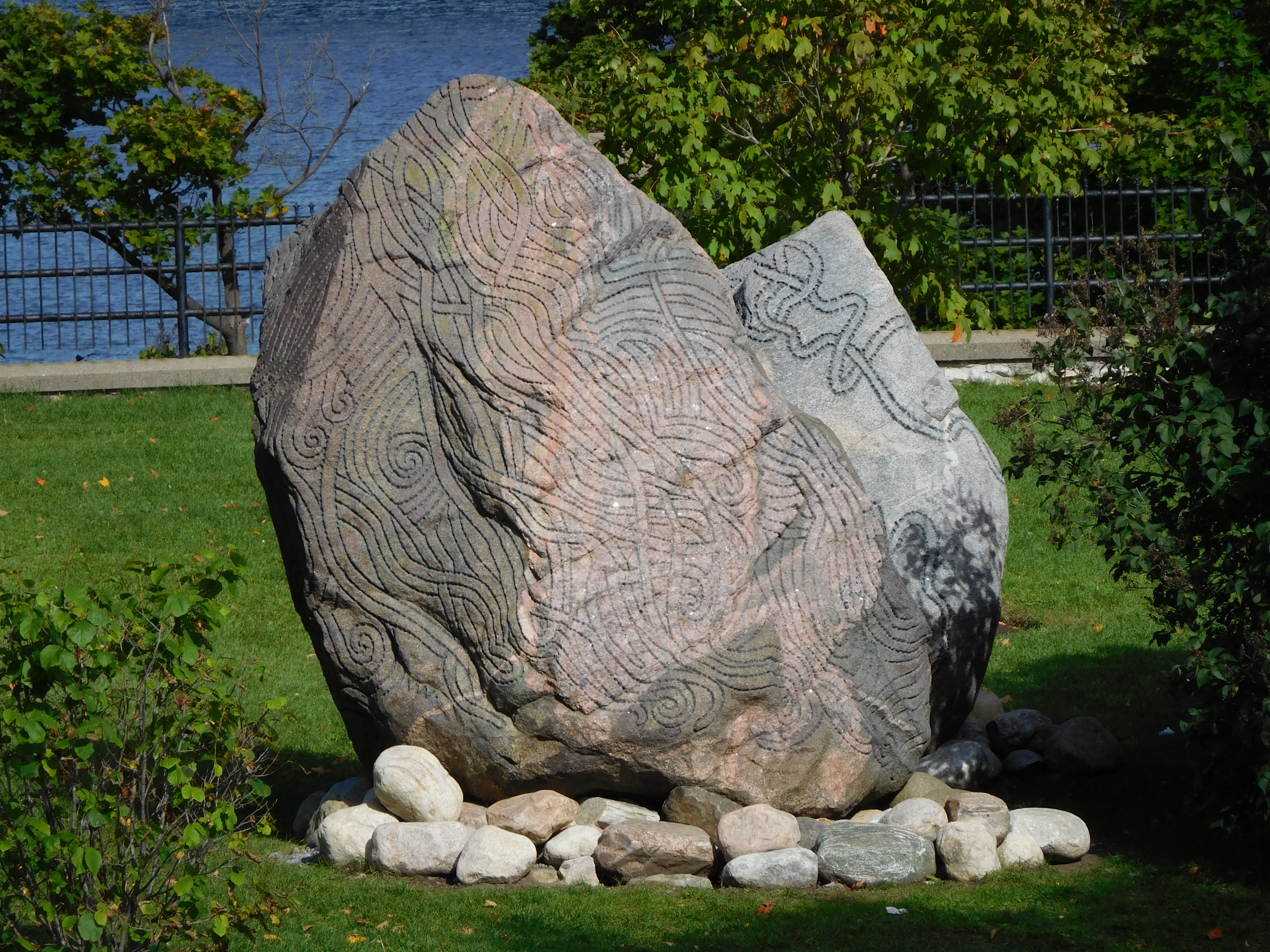
Bill Vazan, Black Nest, 1989–1991
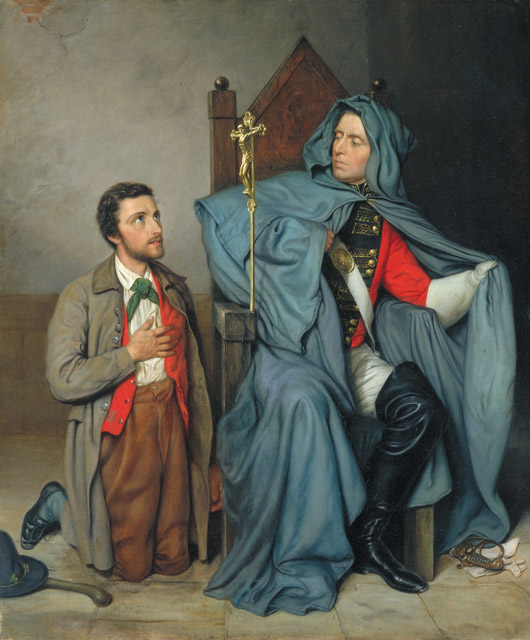
Charlotte Schreiber, The Croppy Boy, 1879

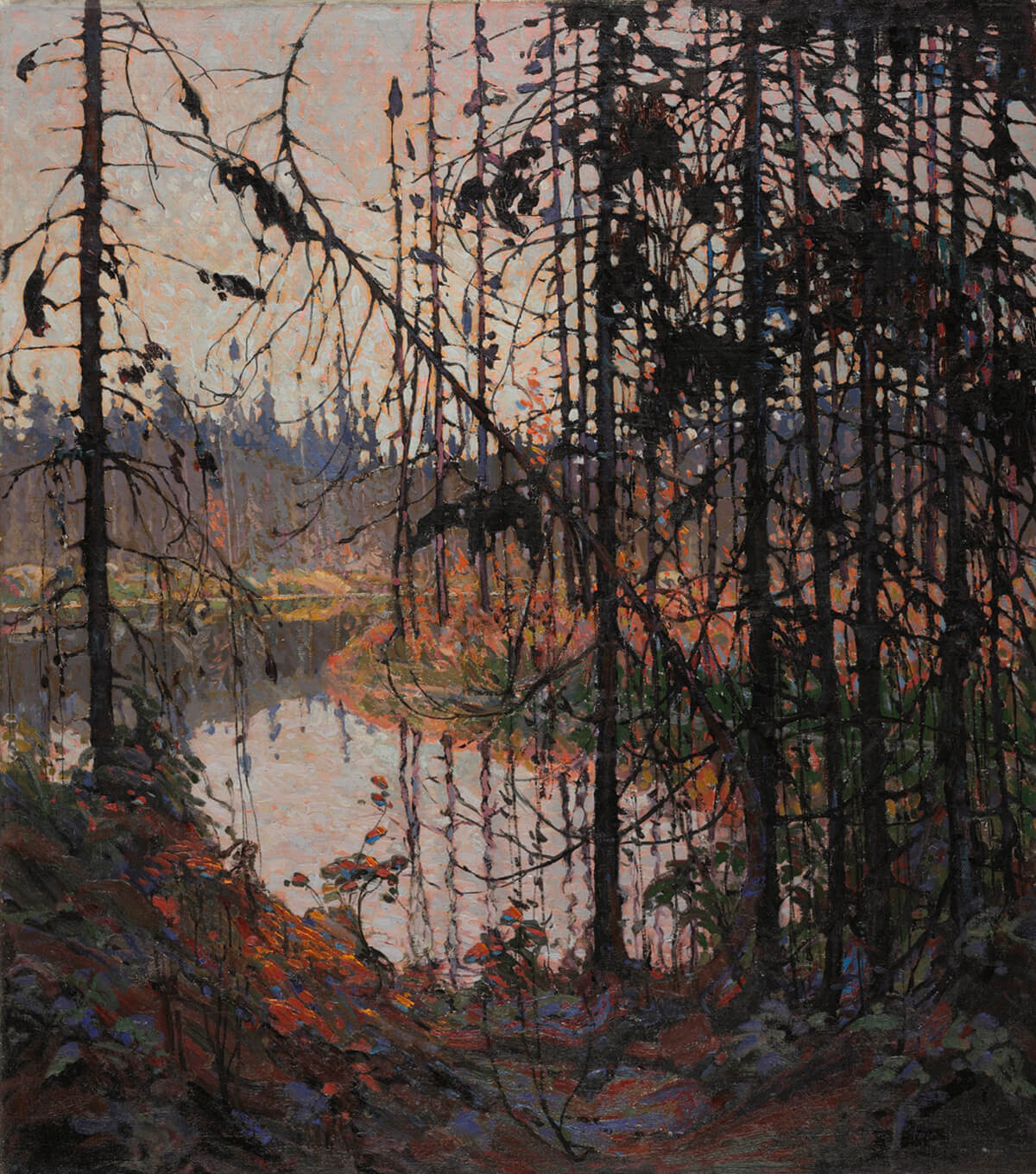
Tom Thomson, Northern River, 1914–15

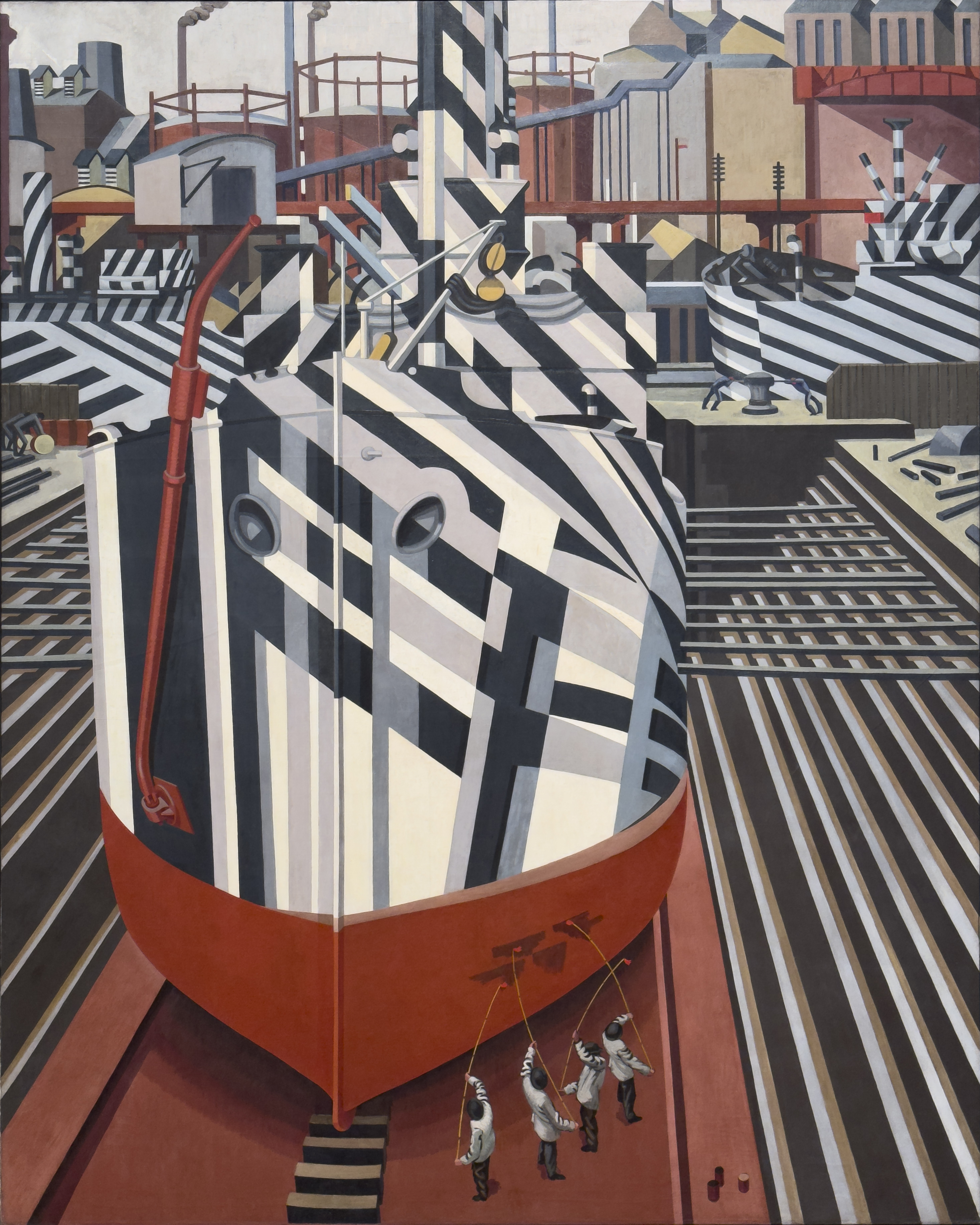
Edward Wadsworth, Dazzle-ships in Drydock at Liverpool, 1919

=== European and American collection ===
- Auguste Rodin, Age of Bronze, 1875–1876, cast in 1901
- Henri Matisse, Yellow Odalisque, 1926
- M. C. Escher, Stars, 1948
- Barnett Newman, Voice of Fire, 1967
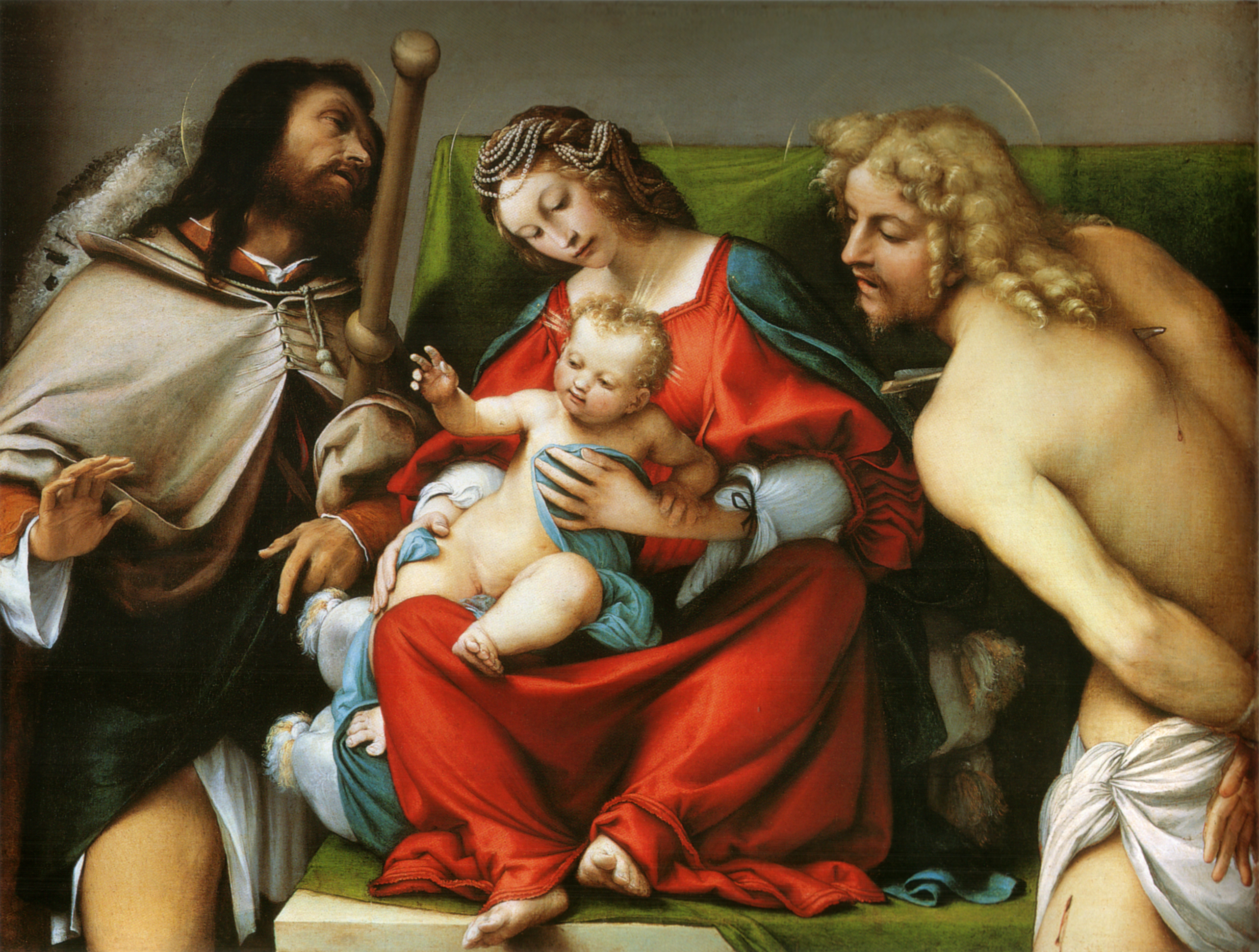
Lorenzo Lotto, Madonna and Child with Saint Roch and Saint Sebastian, c. 1518

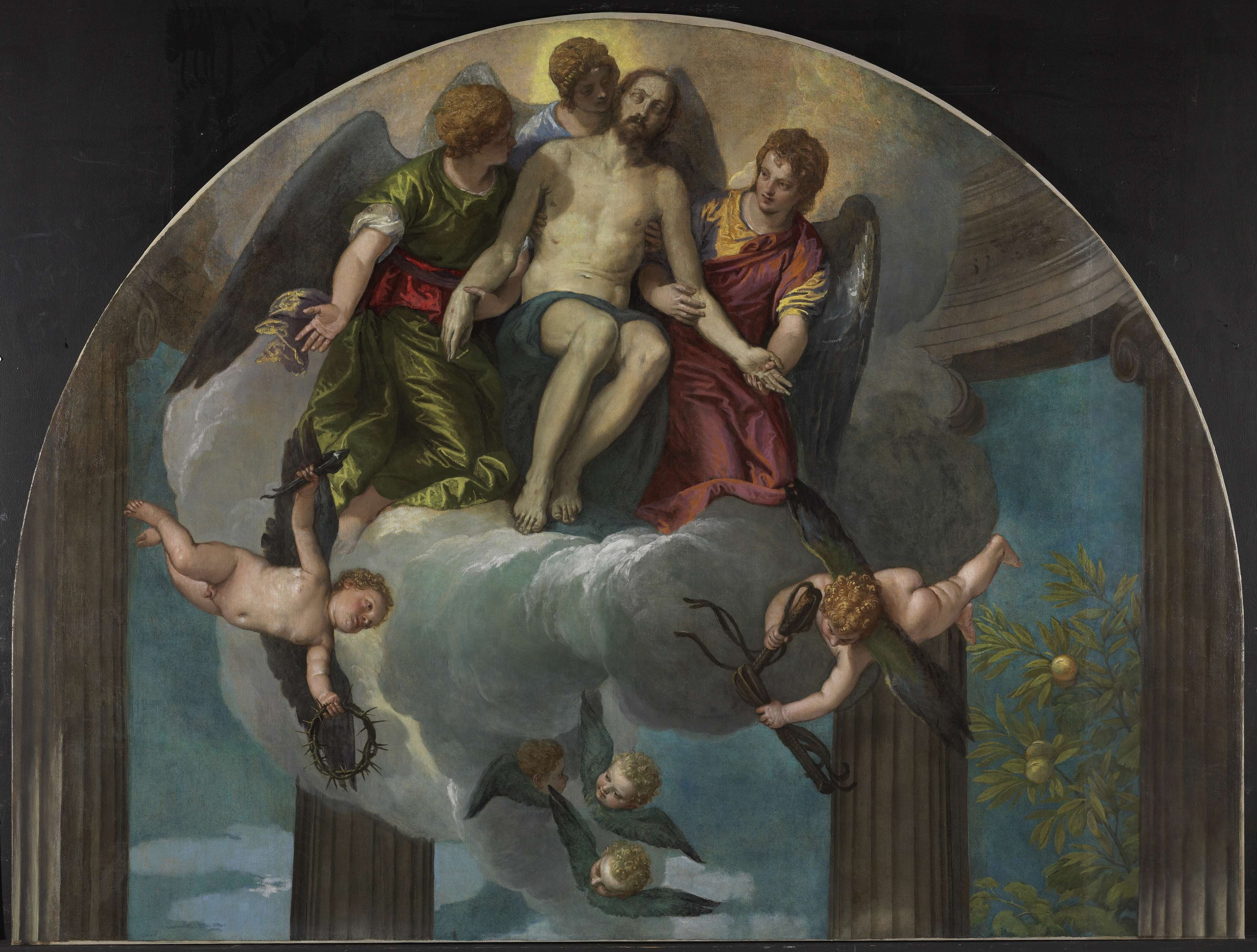
Paolo Veronese, Fragment of the Petrobelli Altarpiece: The Dead Christ with Angels, c. 1563

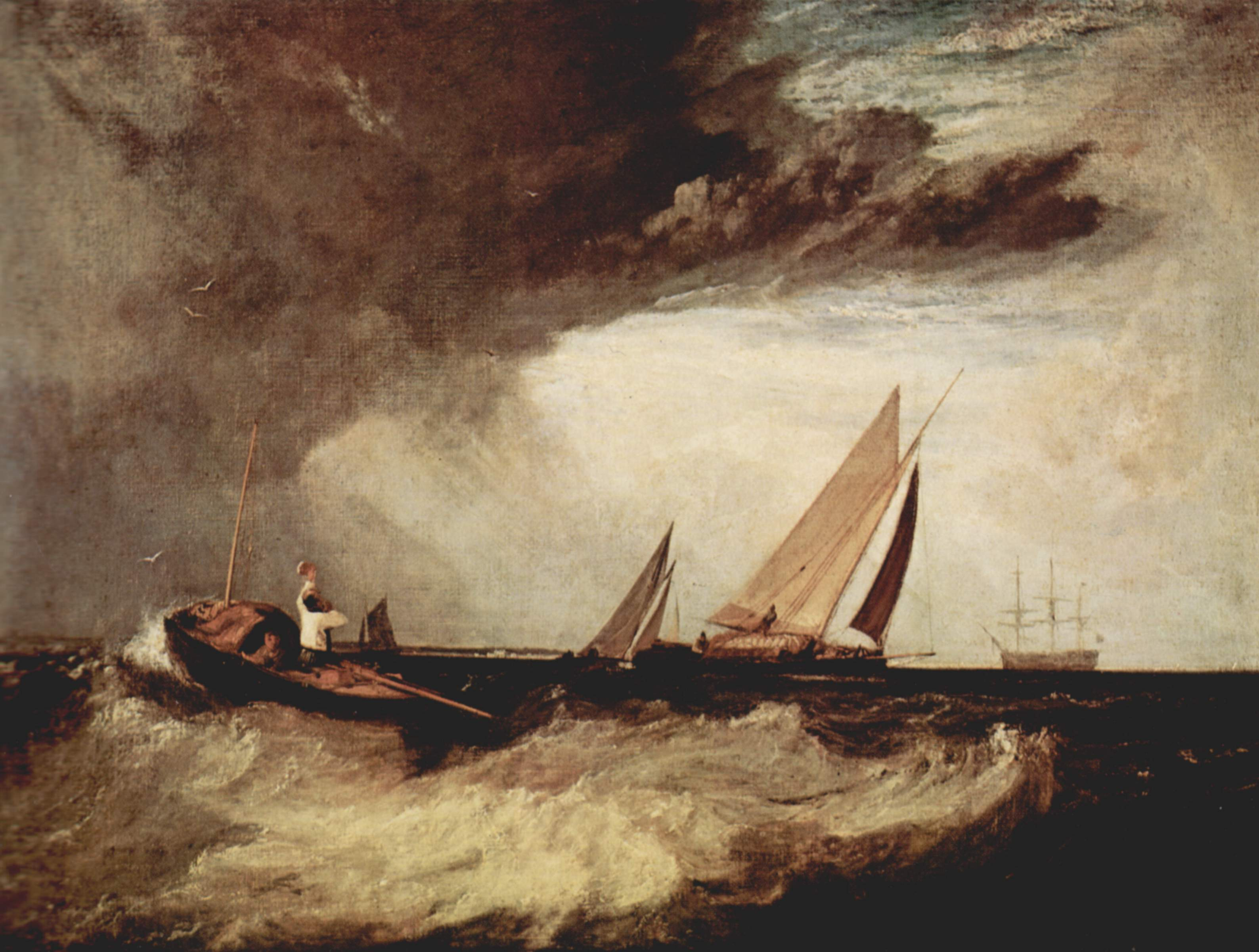
J. M. W. Turner, Shoeburyness Fishermen Hailing a Whitstable Hoy, c. 1809

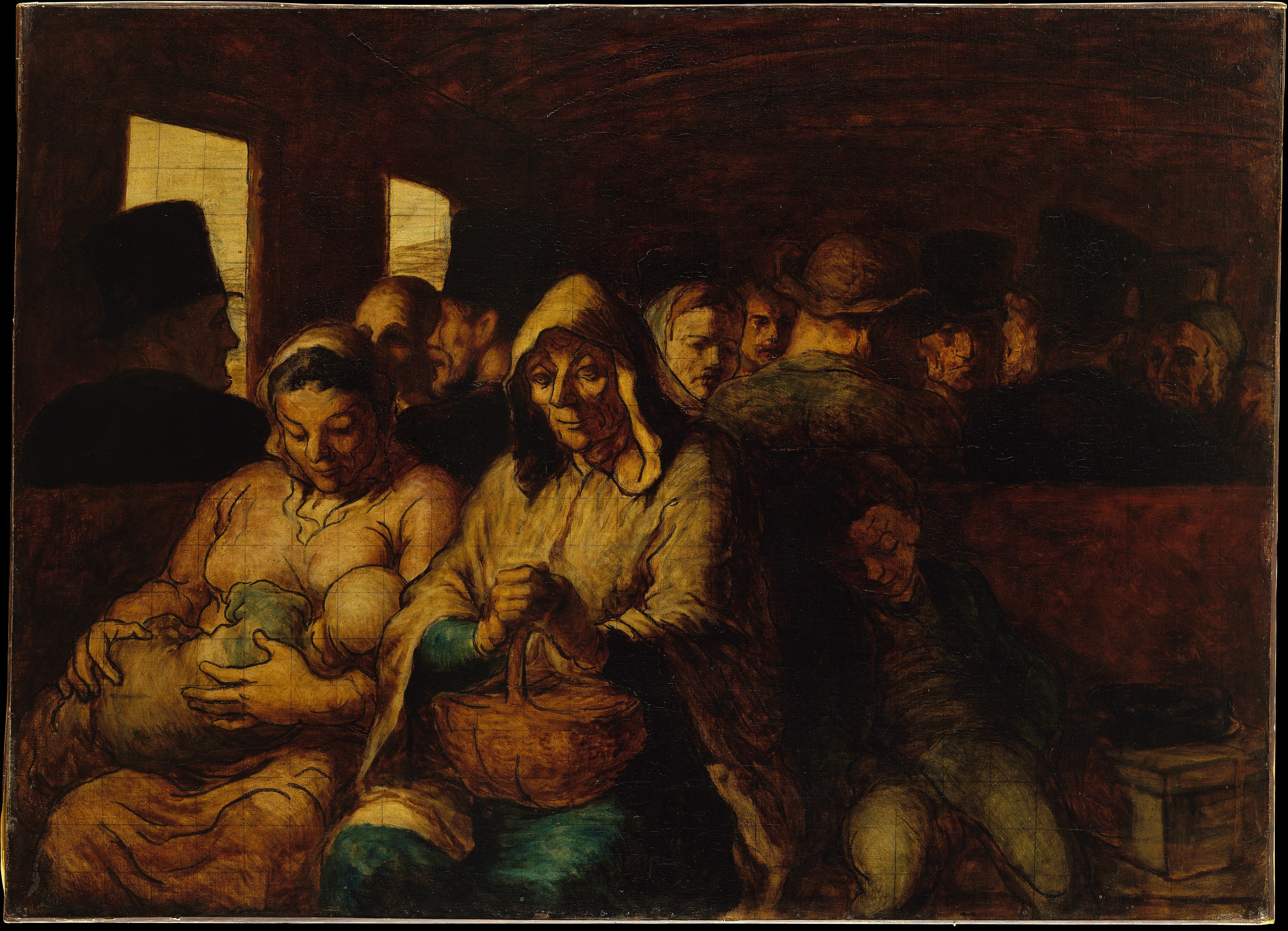
Honoré Daumier, The Third-Class Carriage, 1863–1865

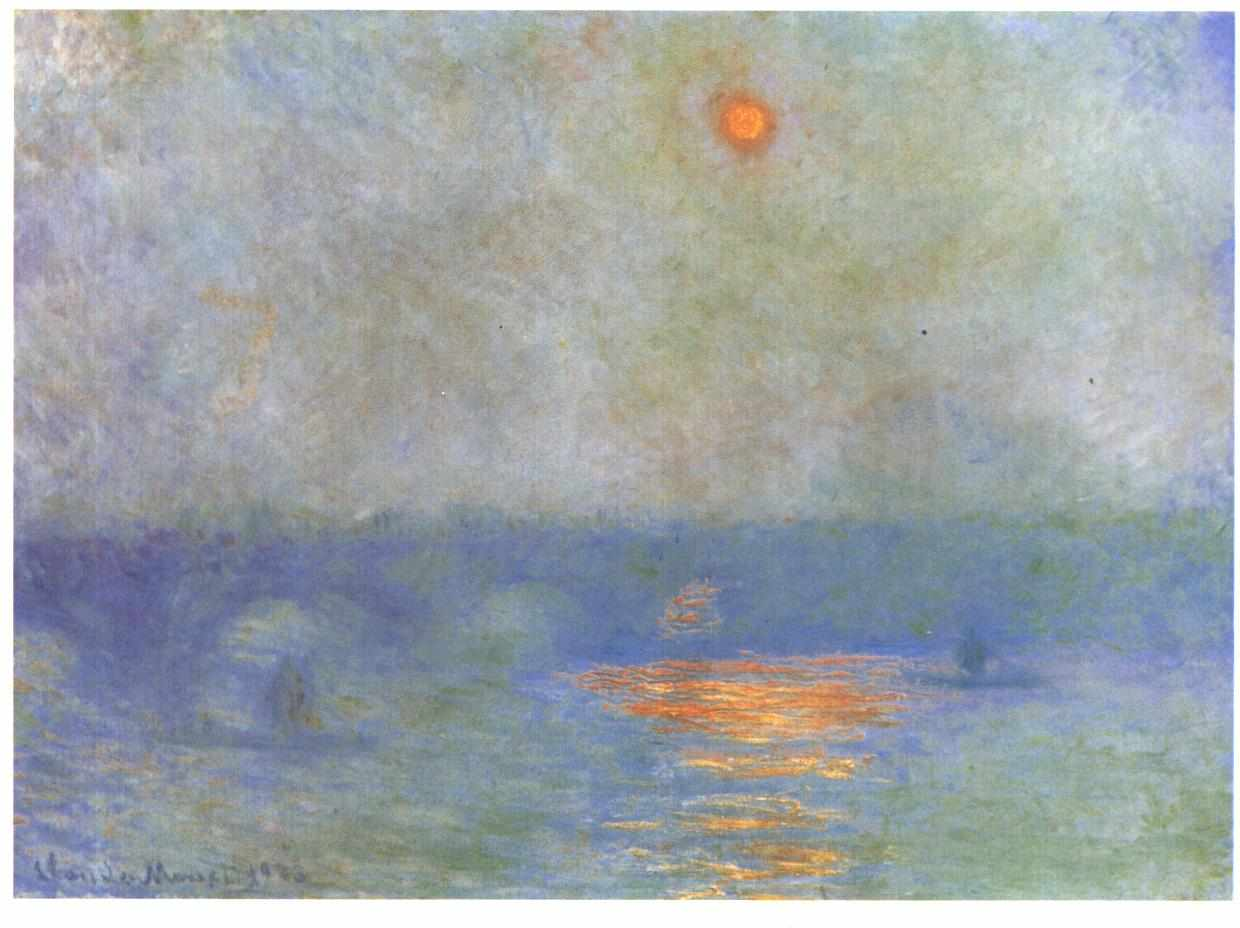
Claude Monet, Waterloo Bridge: the Sun in a Fog, 1903

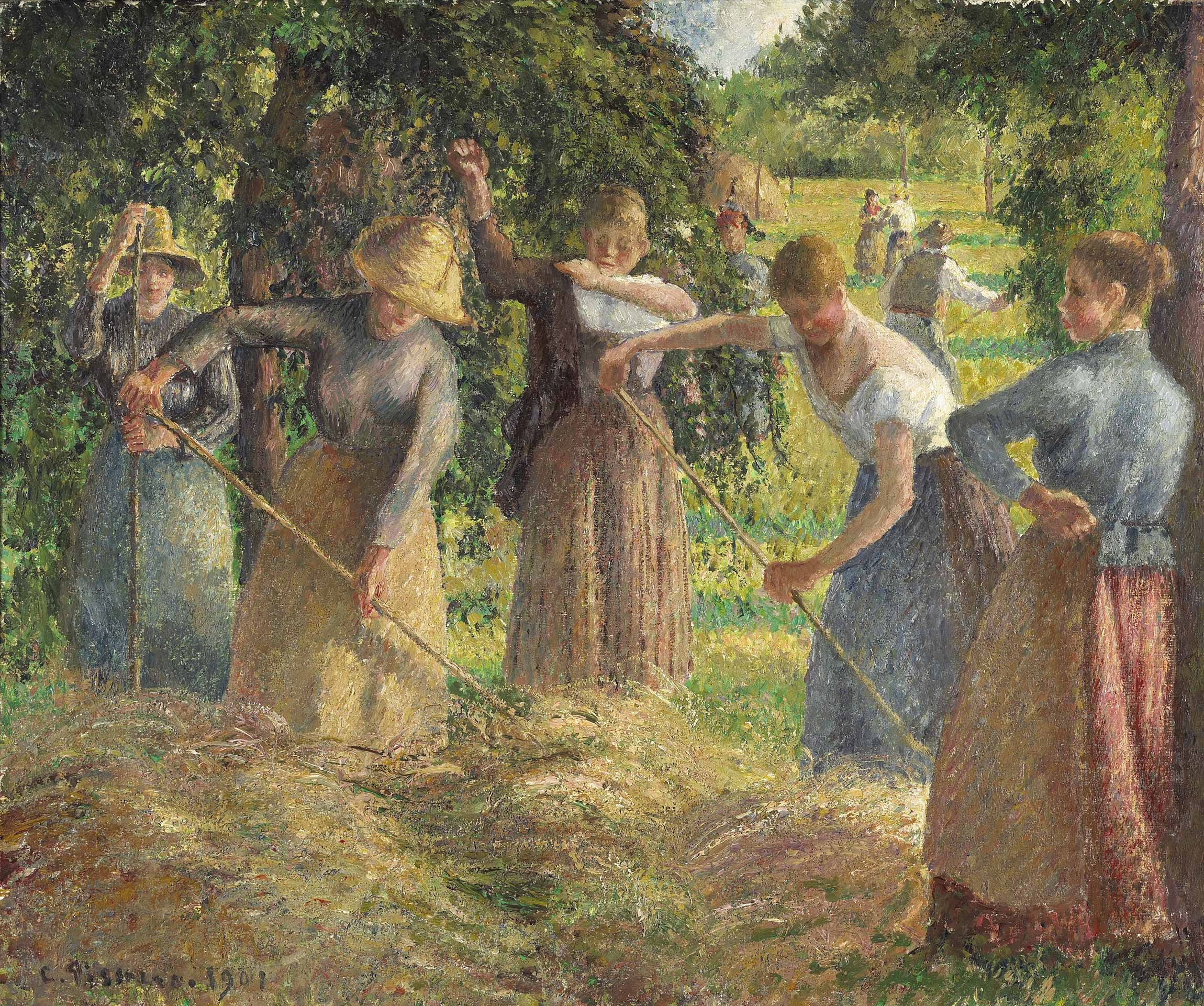
Camille Pissarro, Hay Harvest at Éragny, 1901
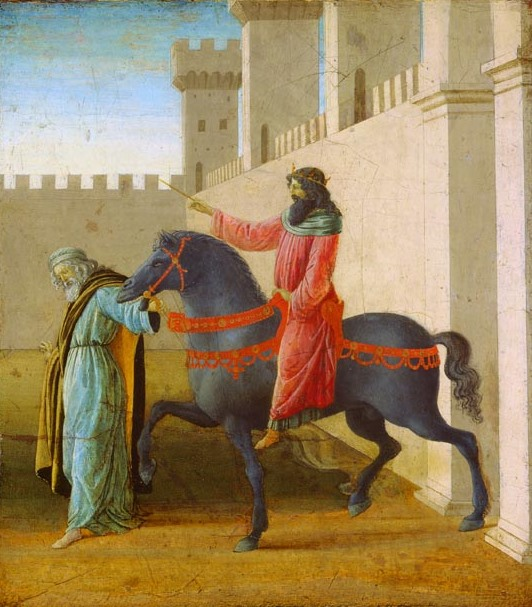
Sandro Botticelli, The Triumph of Mordecai, c. 1475

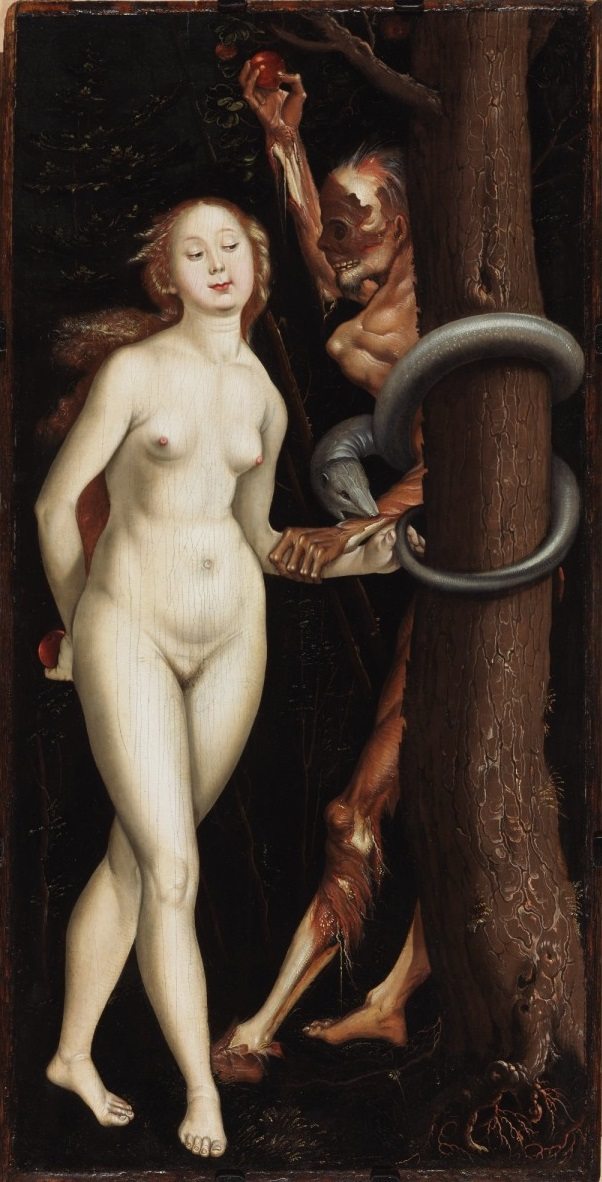
Hans Baldung, Eve, the Serpent, and Death, c. 1510–1515

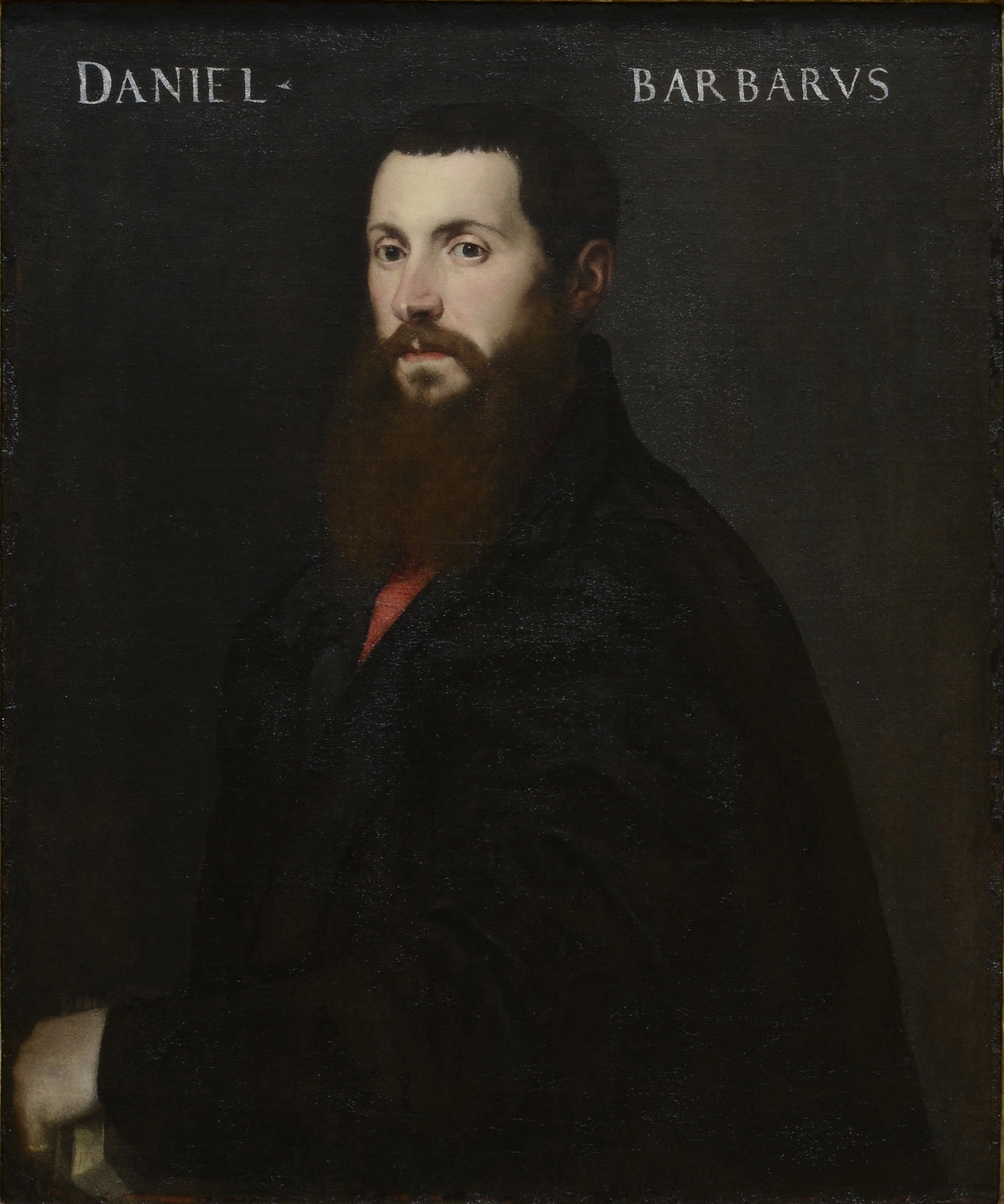
Titian, Daniele Barbaro, 1545k

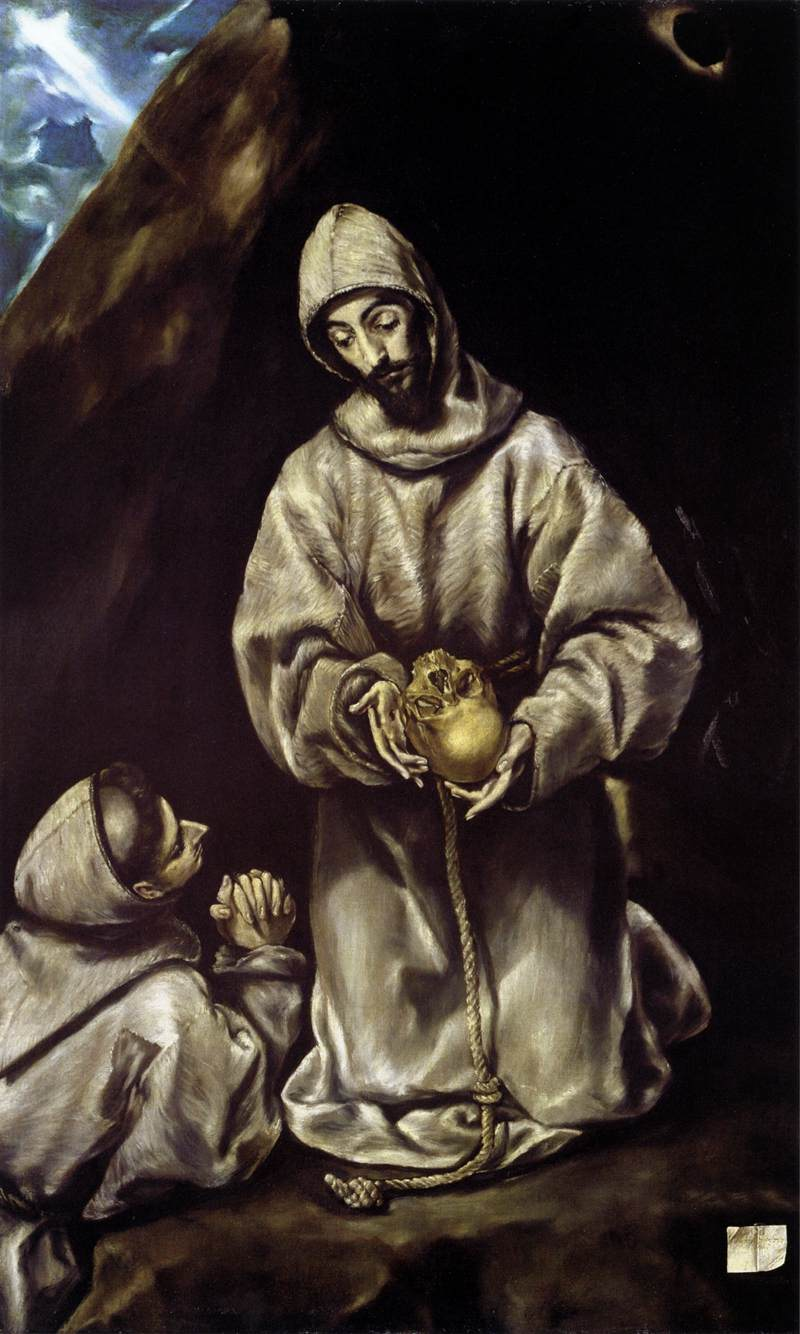
El Greco, St. Francis and Brother Leo Meditating on Death, c. 1600–1605

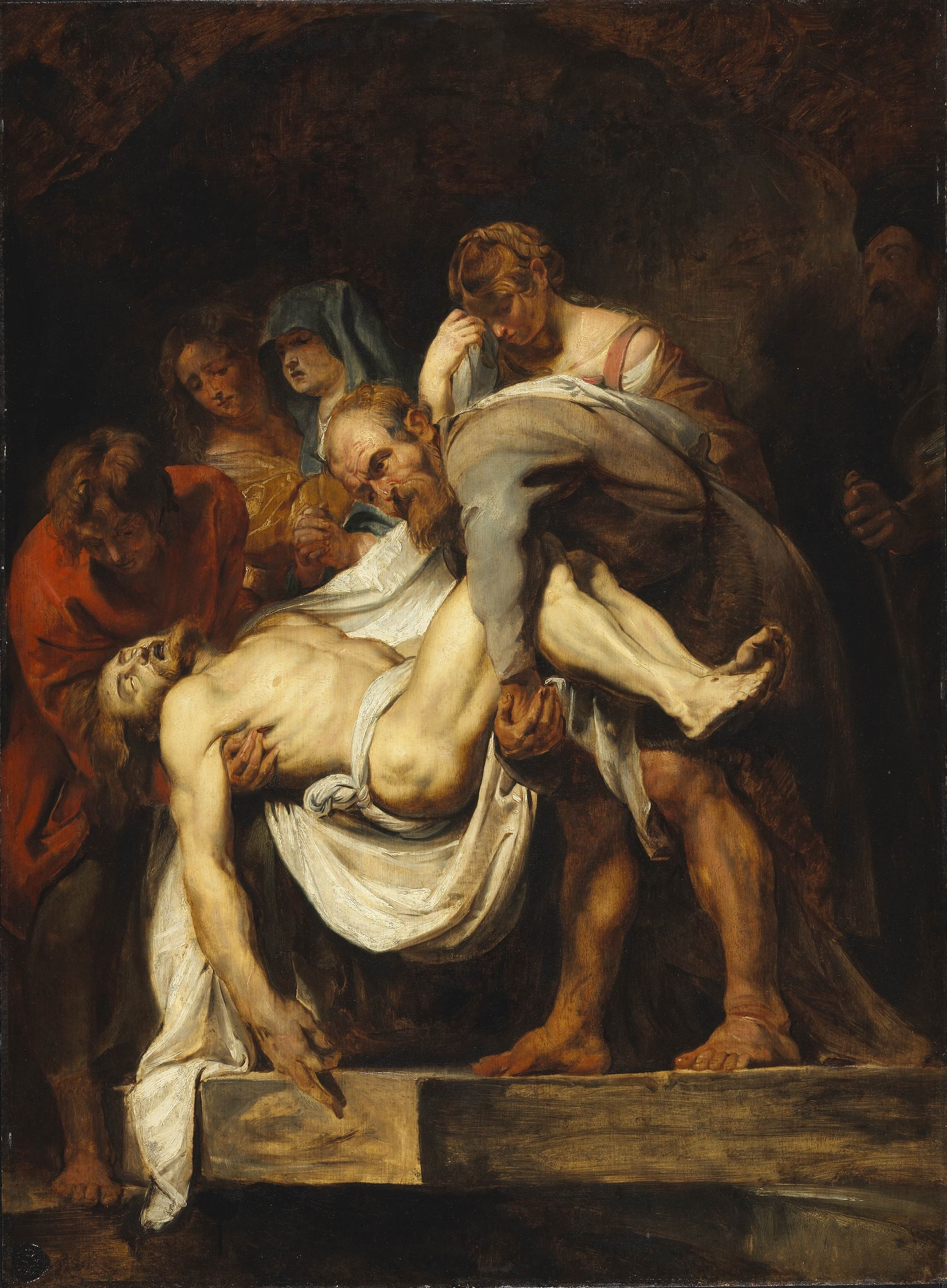
Peter Paul Rubens, The Entombment, c. 1612–1615

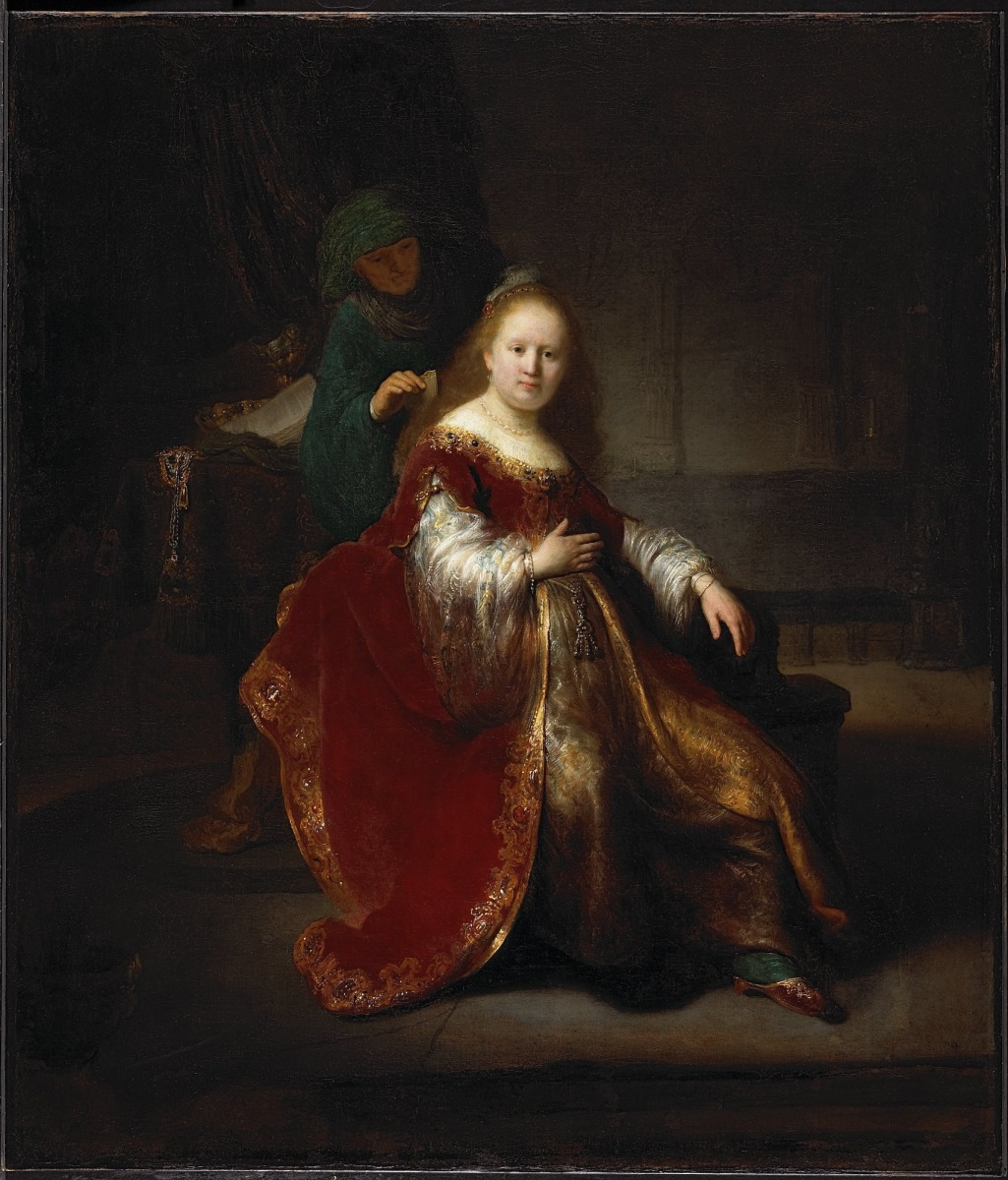
Rembrandt, Heroine from the Old Testament, 1632–33

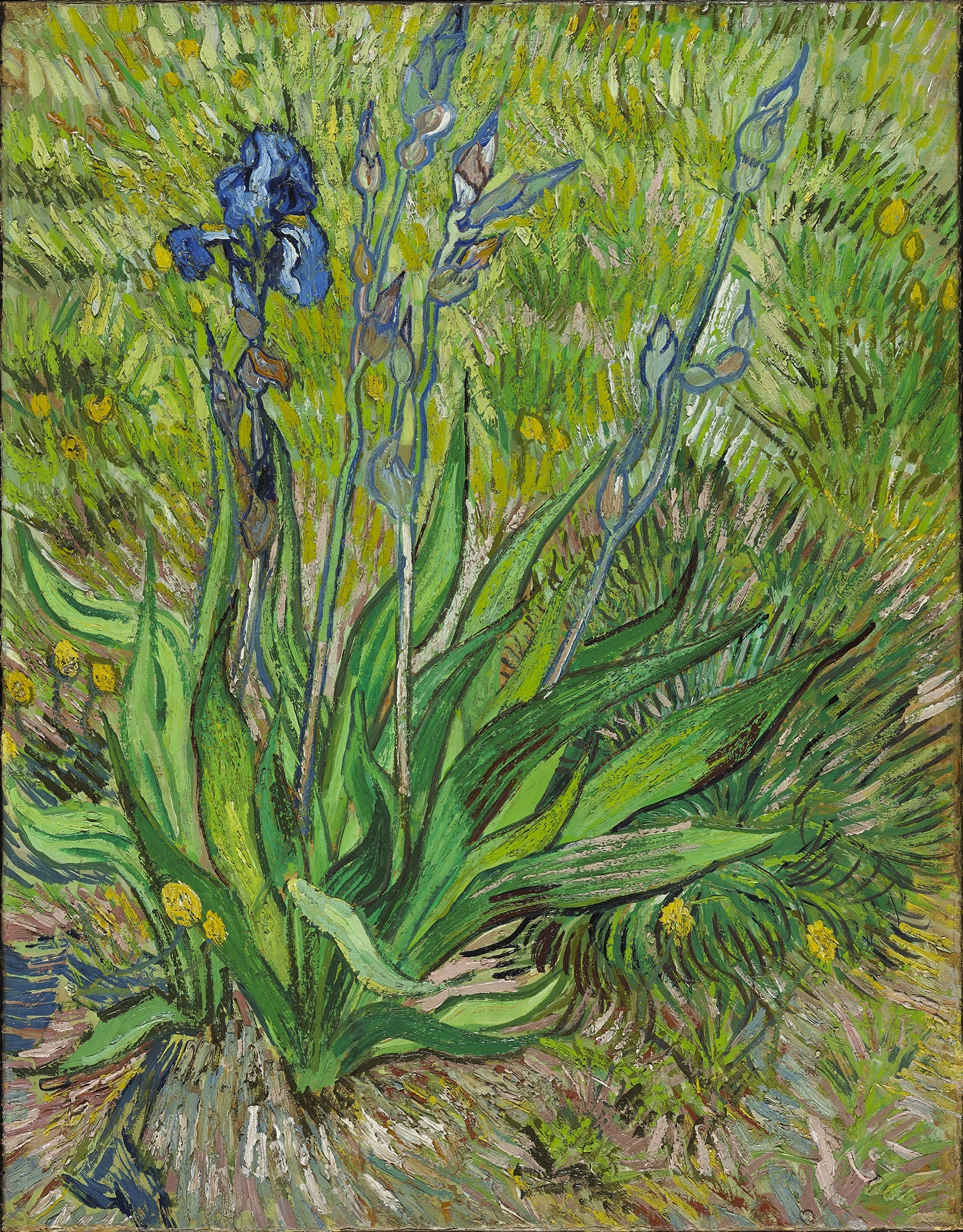
Vincent van Gogh, Iris, 1890

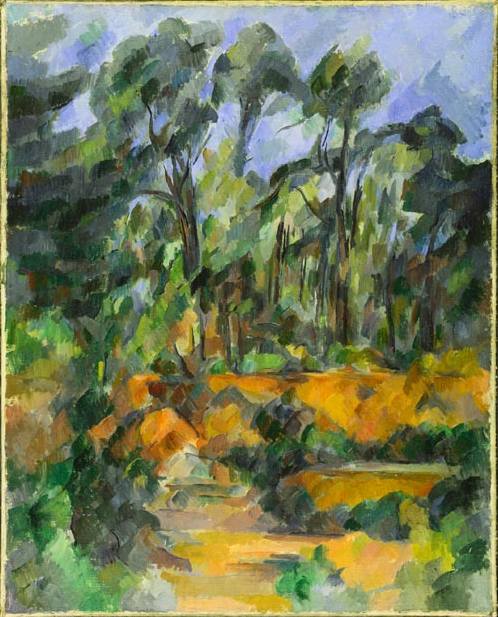
Paul Cézanne, Forest, c. 1902–1904

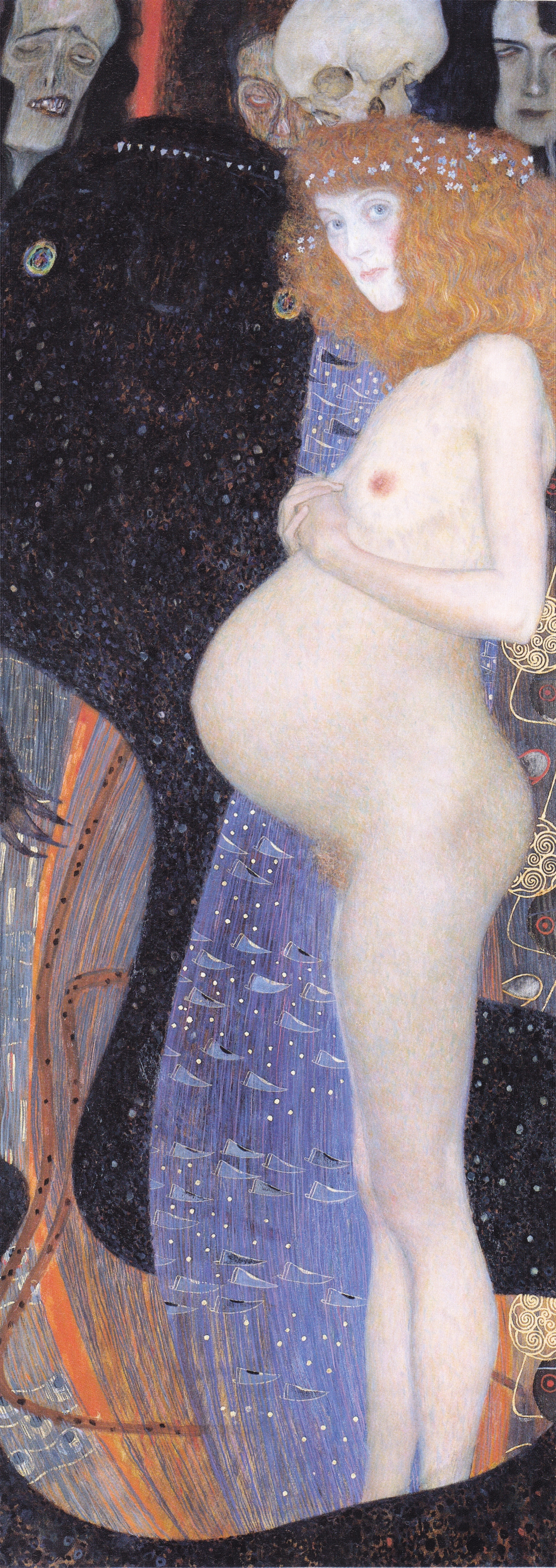
Gustav Klimt, Hope I, 1903

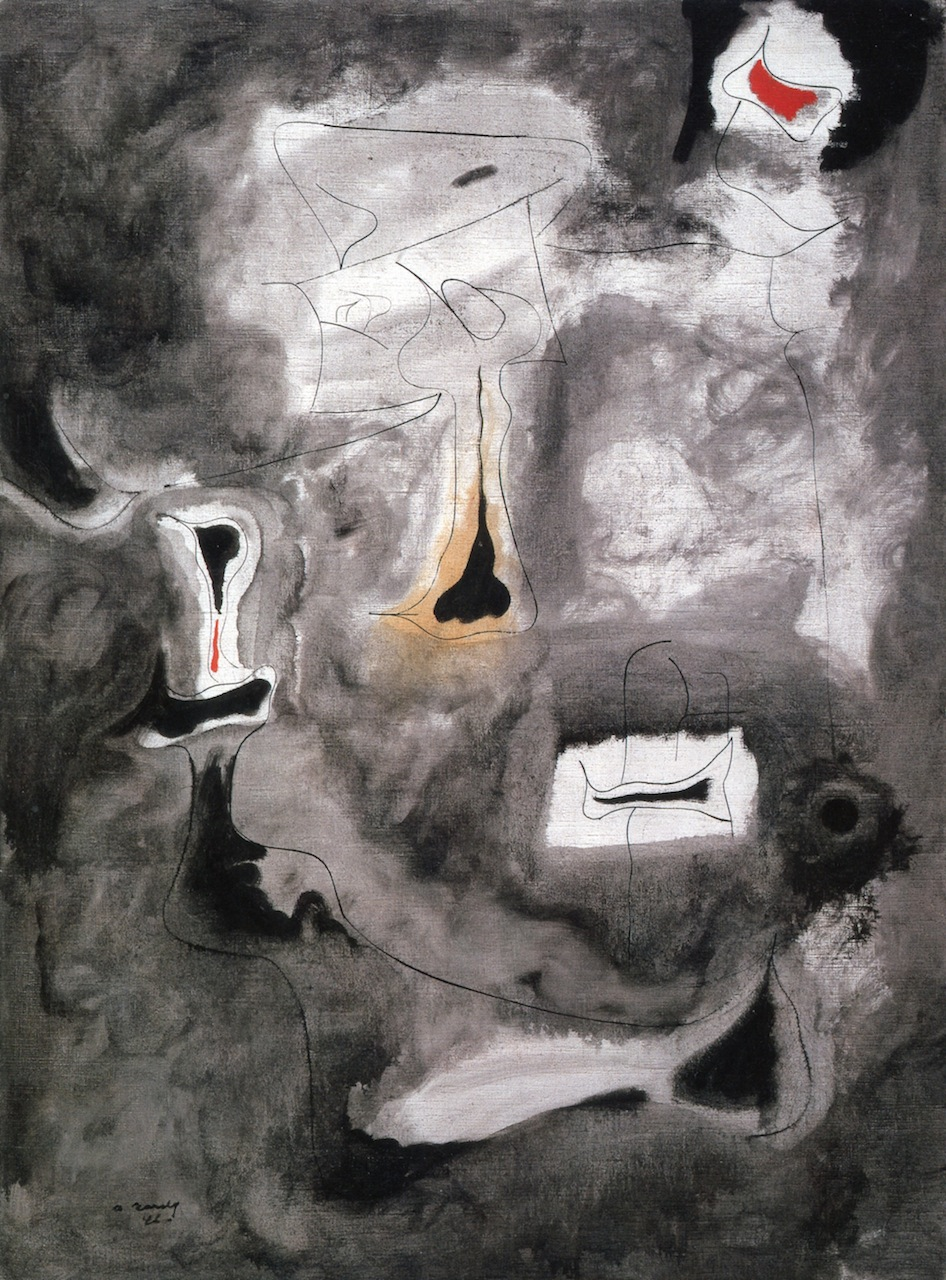
Arshile Gorky, Charred Beloved II, 1946

=== Prints and drawings collection ===
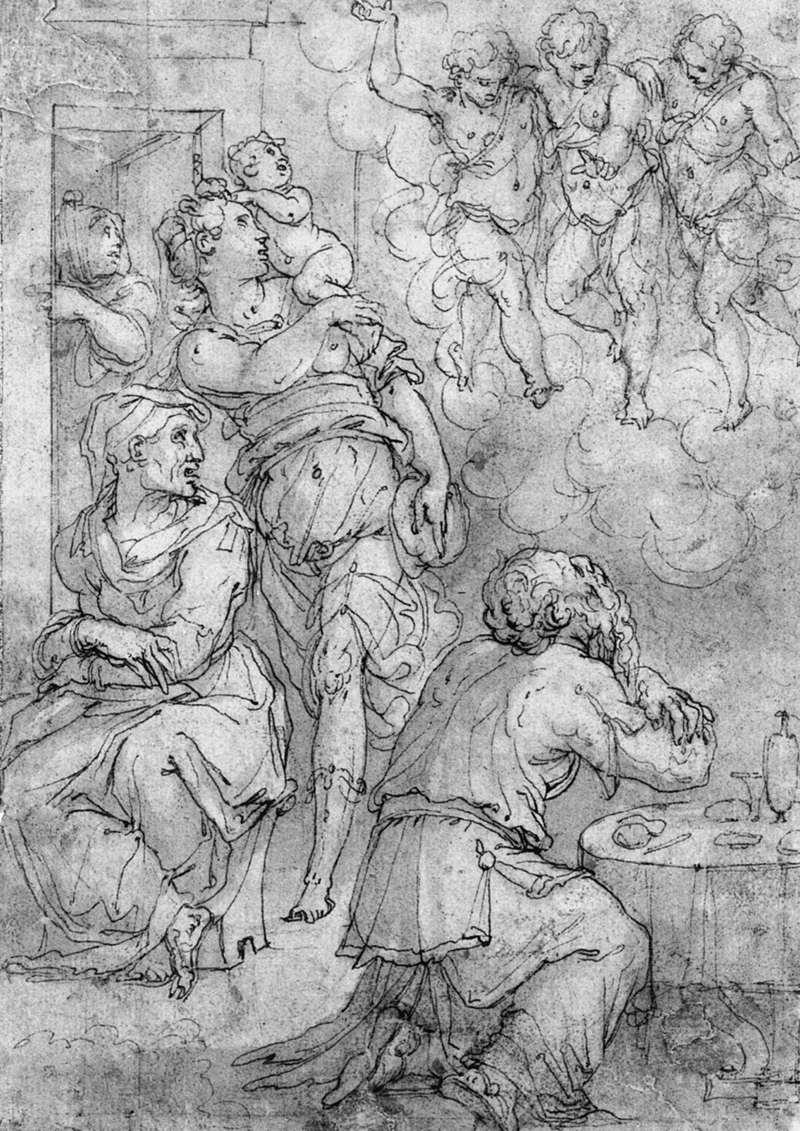
Giorgio Vasari, Abraham and the Three Angels, c. 16th century

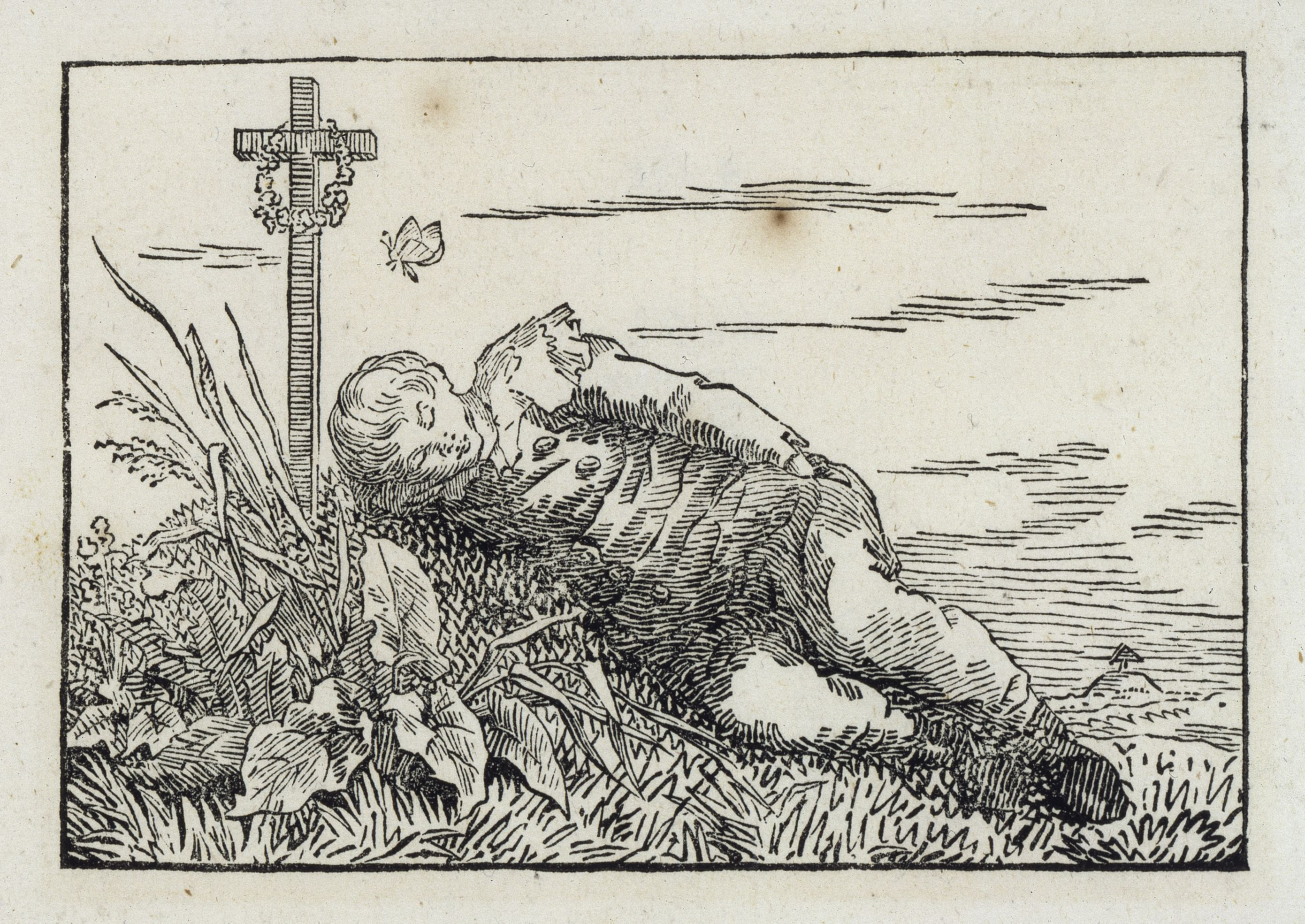
Caspar David Friedrich, Boy Sleeping on a Grave, c. 1801–1803

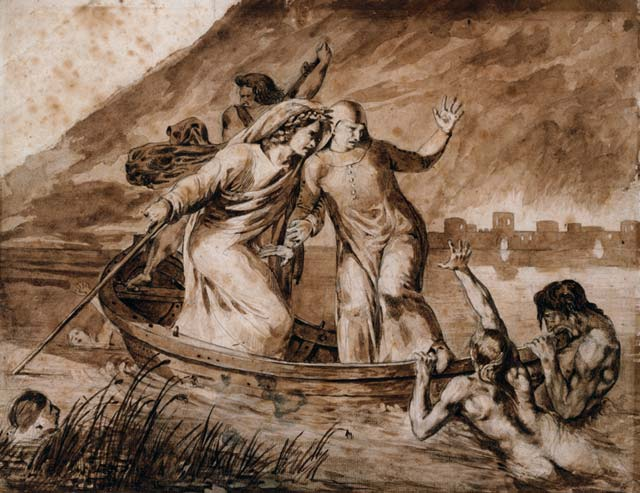
Eugène Delacroix, The Barque of Dante, c. 1820

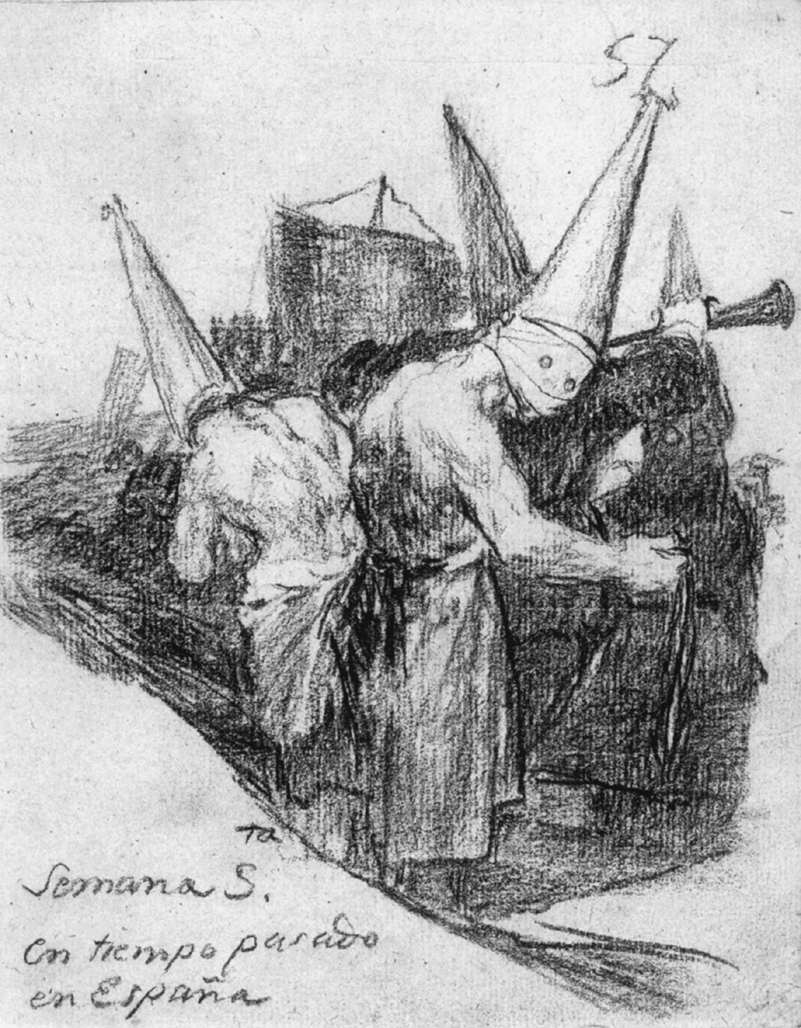
Francisco Goya, Holy Week in Spain in Times Past, c. 1825

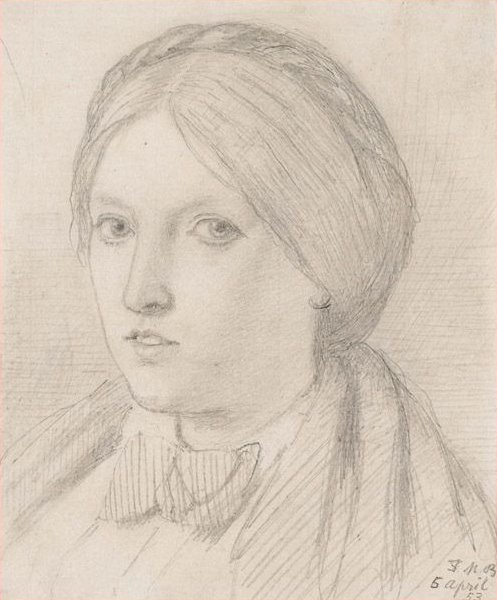
Ford Madox Brown, Portrait of Emma Madox Brown, 1853

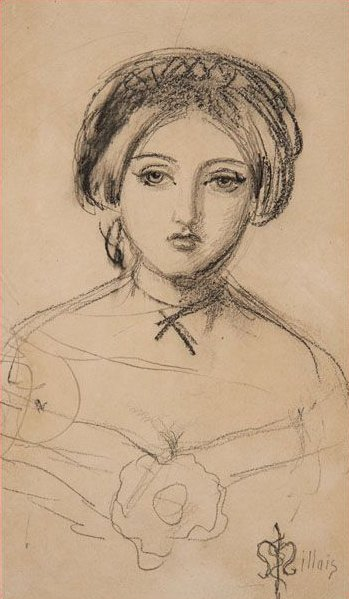
John Everett Millais, Portrait of Effie Ruskin, c. 1853

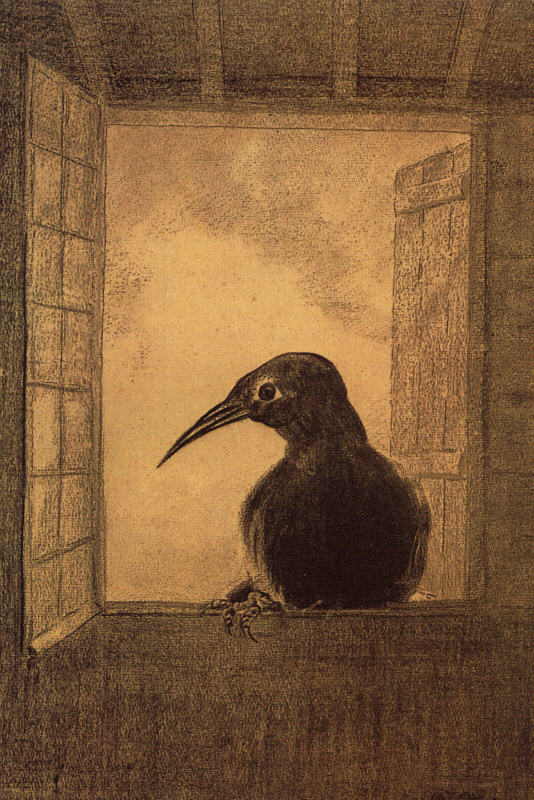
Odilon Redon, The Raven, 1882

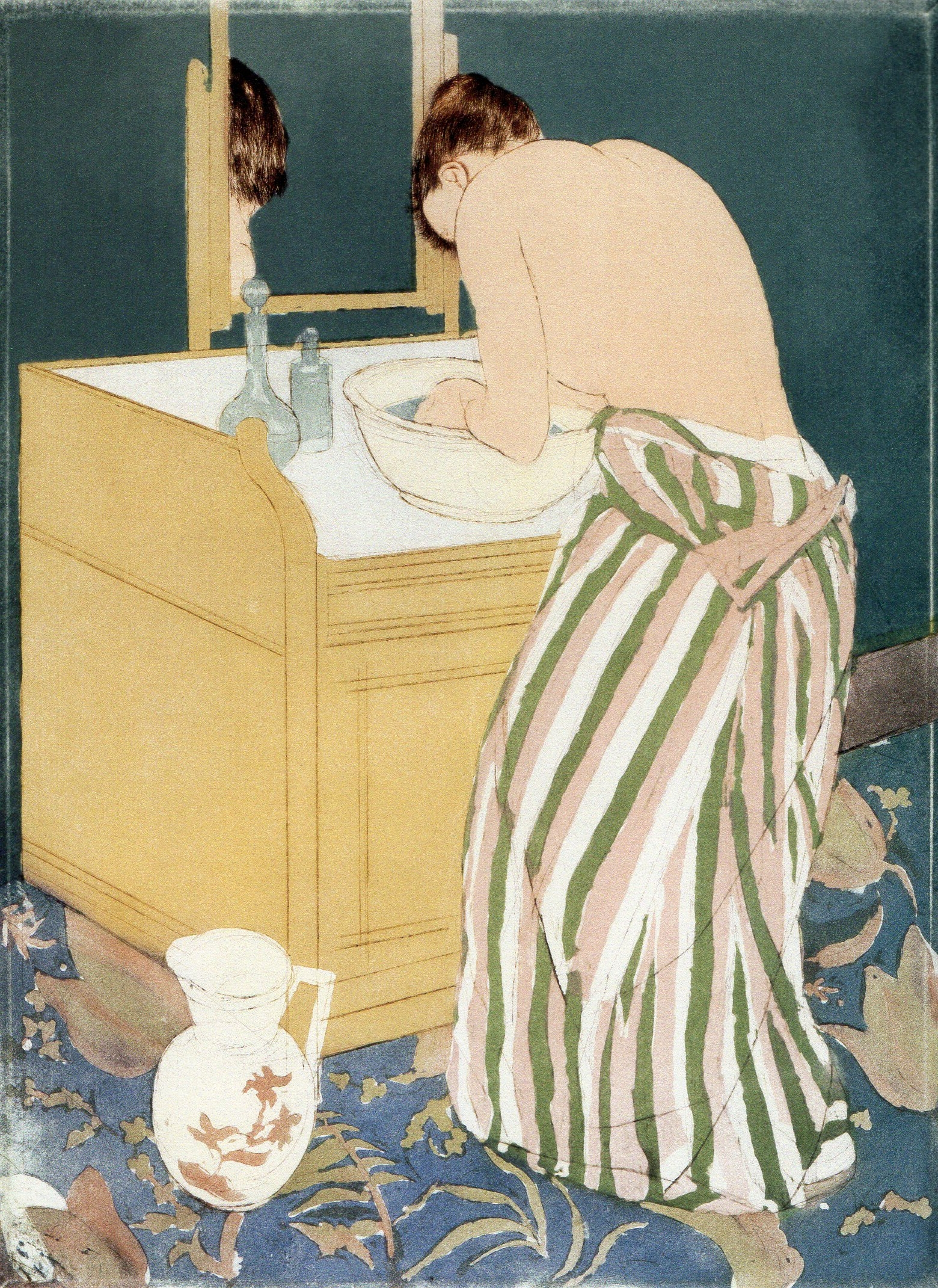
Mary Cassatt, Woman Bathing, c. 1890–1891

== See also ==
- Kathleen Fenwick, first gallery curator, from 1929 to 1968
- List of art museums
- List of largest art museums
- List of museums in Ontario
- List of national galleries
- National museums of Canada
