= St. Lawrence River =

River in eastern Canada and the United States

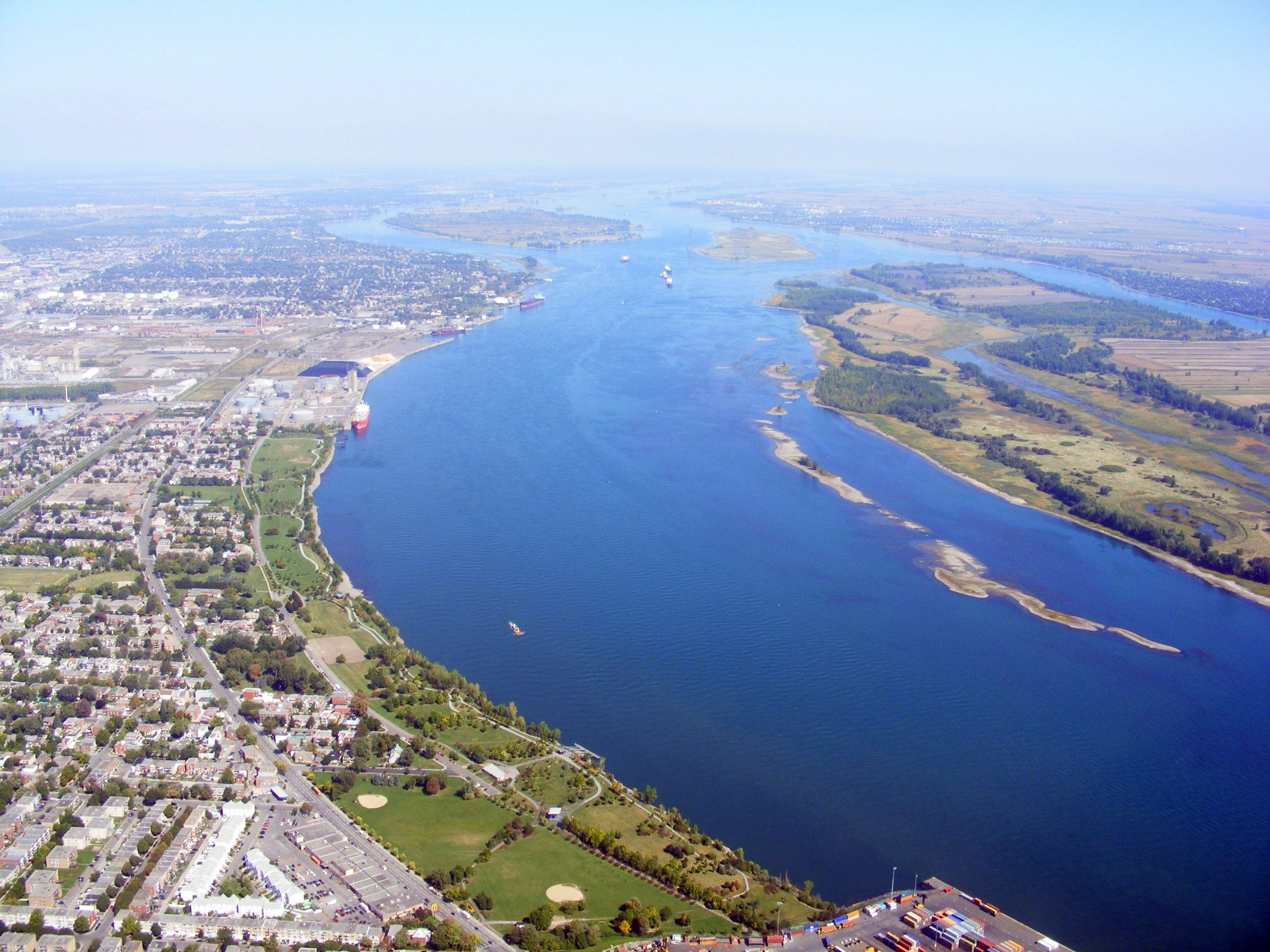
- Montréal-Est, Quebec

- Great Lakes/St. Lawrence watershed
- Etymology: Saint Lawrence of Rome
- Native name: Saint Lawrence River (English); Fleuve Saint-Laurent (French)

Location
- Country: Canada, United States
- Provinces: Ontario, Quebec
- States: New York, Vermont

Physical characteristics
- Source: Lake Ontario
  - location: Kingston, Ontario / Cape Vincent, New York
  - coordinates: 44°06′N 76°24′W
  - elevation: 74.7 m (245 ft)
- Mouth: Gulf of St. Lawrence / Atlantic Ocean
  - location: Quebec, Canada
  - coordinates: 49°30′N 64°30′W
  - elevation: 0 m (0 ft)
- Length: 500 km (310 mi) excluding the estuary, c. 928 km if included (St. Lawrence River–Lake Ontario–Niagara–Lake Erie–Detroit–Lake St. Clair–St. Clair–Lake Huron–St. Marys River–Lake Superior–St. Louis–North River: 3,058 km)
- Basin size: 1,344,200 km^{2} (519,000 sq mi) (Pointe-des-Monts: 1,271,547.4 km^{2})
- Width
  - average: 1–5 km (0.62–3.11 mi)
- Depth
  - minimum: 2 m (6 ft 7 in) (Fluvial Section)
  - maximum: 60 m (200 ft) (Quebec City)
- Discharge
  - location: Pointe-des-Monts
  - average: (Period: 1969–2023)17,600 m^{3}/s (620,000 cu ft/s)
  - minimum: 10,478 m^{3}/s (370,000 cu ft/s)
  - maximum: 33,085 m^{3}/s (1,168,400 cu ft/s)
- Discharge
  - location: Tadoussac
  - average: (Period: 1962–1988)16,800 m^{3}/s (590,000 cu ft/s)
- Discharge
  - location: Quebec City
  - average: (Period: 1968–2023)12,500 m^{3}/s (440,000 cu ft/s)
  - minimum: 8,600 m^{3}/s (300,000 cu ft/s)
  - maximum: 22,766 m^{3}/s (804,000 cu ft/s)
- Discharge
  - location: Montreal
  - average: (Period: 1971–2000)10,063.3 m^{3}/s (355,380 cu ft/s)
- Discharge
  - location: Cornwall
  - average: (1861–2019)7,060 m^{3}/s (249,000 cu ft/s)

Basin features
- Progression: Gulf of St. Lawrence
- River system: St. Lawrence River

The St. Lawrence River (French: Fleuve Saint-Laurent, pronounced [flœv sɛ̃ lɔʁɑ̃]) is a large international river in the middle latitudes of North America connecting the Great Lakes with the North Atlantic Ocean. Its waters flow in a northeasterly direction from Lake Ontario to the Gulf of St. Lawrence, traversing Ontario and Quebec in Canada and New York in the United States. A portion of the river demarcates the Canada–United States border.

As the primary drainage outflow of the Great Lakes Basin, the St. Lawrence has the second-highest discharge of any river in North America (after the Mississippi River) and the 16th-highest in the world. The estuary of the St. Lawrence is often cited by scientists as the largest in the world. Significant natural landmarks of the river and estuary include the 1,864 river islands of the Thousand Islands, the endangered whales of Saguenay–St. Lawrence Marine Park, and the limestone monoliths of the Mingan Archipelago.

Long a transportation route to Indigenous peoples, the St. Lawrence River has played a key role in the history of Canada and in the development of cities such as Montreal and Quebec City. The river remains an important shipping route as the backbone of the St. Lawrence Seaway, a lock-and-canal system that enables world marine traffic to access the inland ports of the Great Lakes Waterway.

== Etymology ==
The river has historically been given a variety of different names by local First Nations. Beginning in the 16th century, French explorers visited what is now Canada and gave the river names such as the Grand fleuve de Hochelaga and the Grande rivière du Canada, where fleuve and rivière are two French words (fleuve being a river that flows into the sea).

The river's present name has been used since 1604, when it was recorded on a map by Samuel de Champlain. Champlain opted for the names Grande riviere de sainct Laurens and Fleuve sainct Laurens in his writings, supplanting the earlier names. In contemporary French, the name is rendered as the fleuve Saint-Laurent. The name Saint-Laurent (Saint Lawrence) was originally applied to the eponymous bay by Jacques Cartier upon his arrival into the region on the 10th of August feast day for Saint Lawrence in 1535.

Indigenous people use the following names:

- Innu-aimun, the language of Nitassinan, refer to it as Wepistukujaw Sipo/Wepìstùkwiyaht sīpu.
- The Abenaki call it Moliantegok/Moliantekw ("Montréal River"), Kchitegw/Ktsitekw/Gicitegw ("Great River"), or Oss8genaizibo/Ws8genaisibo/Wsogenaisibo ("River of the Algonquins").
- In the Mohawk language, it is Roiatatokenti, Raoteniateara, Ken'tarókwen, or Kaniatarowanénhne.
- Tuscarora people call it Kahnawáˀkye or Kaniatarowanenneh ("Big Water Current").
- Algonquin people call it "the Walking Path" or Magtogoek, or Kitcikanii sipi, the "Large Water River".
- The Wendat Nation call it Lada8anna or Laooendaooena'.
- The Atikamekw of Nitaskinan refer to it as Micta sipi ("Huge River").

== Geography ==
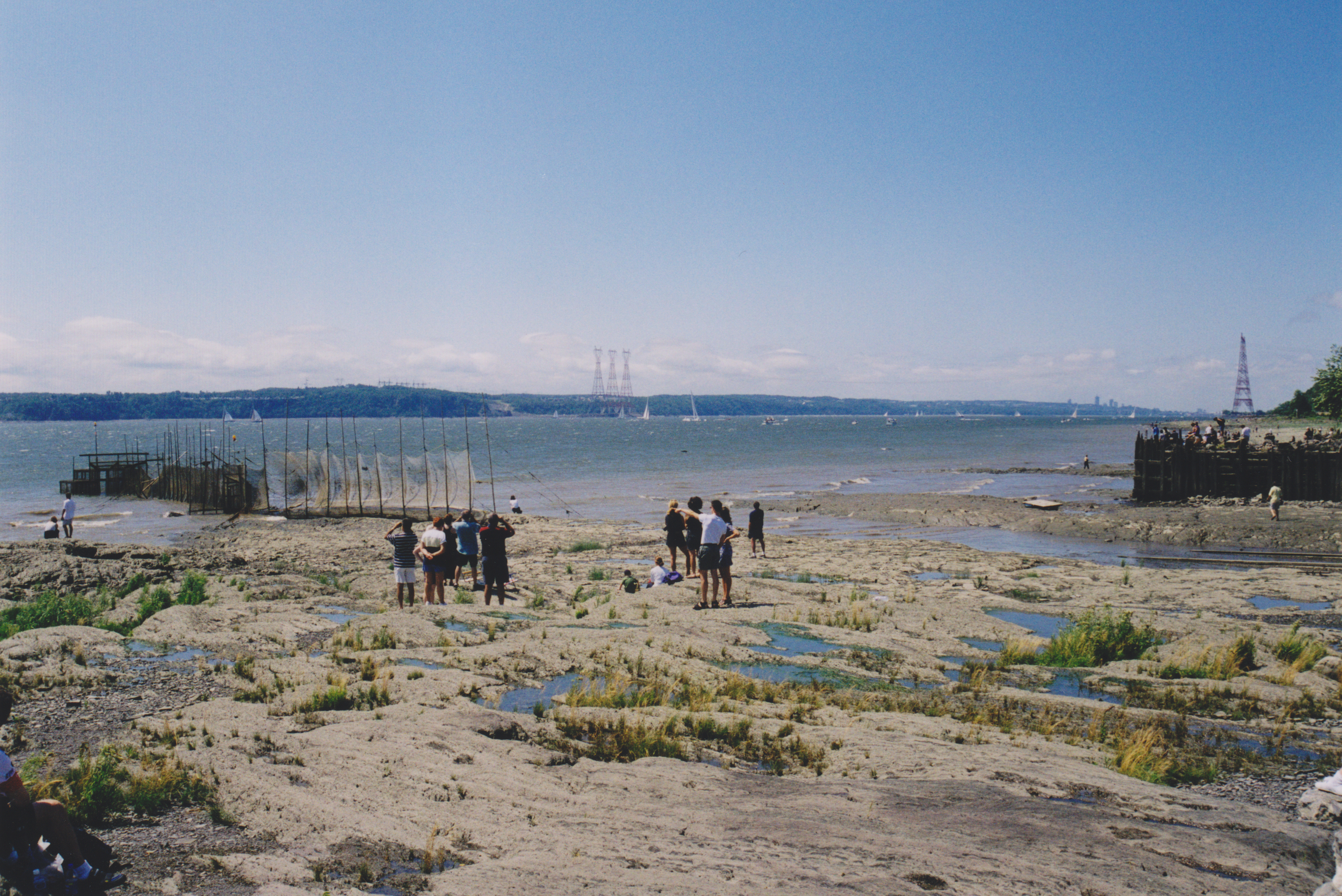
Boats of the Transat Québec–Saint-Malo on the St. Lawrence River in 2000

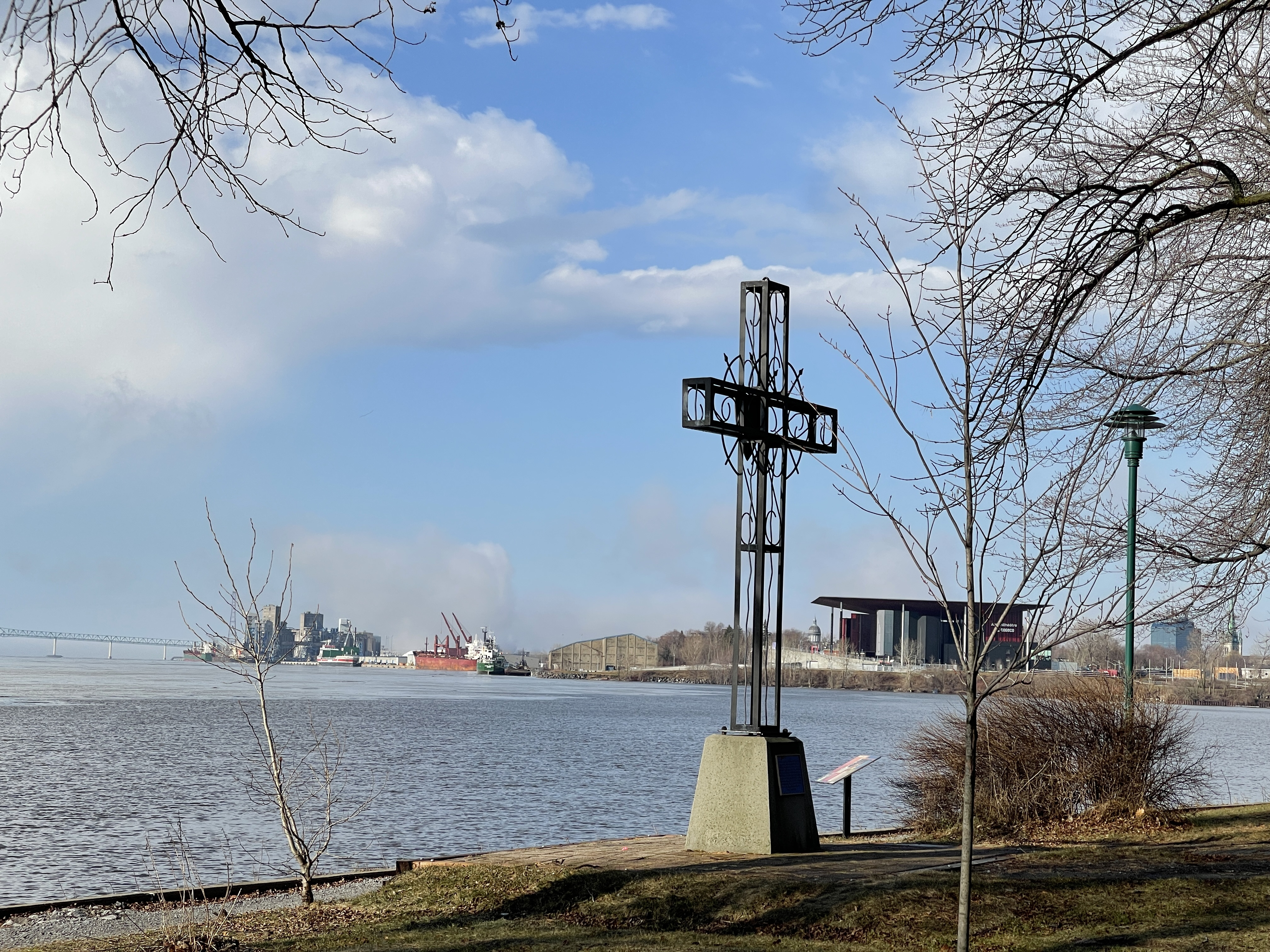
Cross commemorating the one laid by Jacques-Cartier on October 7, 1535, Trois-Rivières

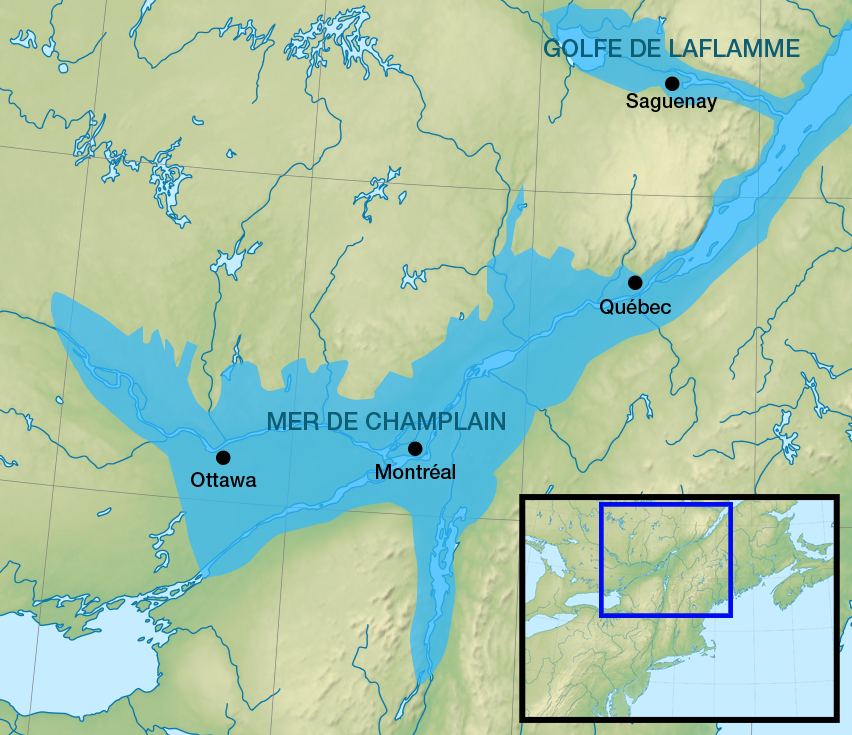
The Champlain Sea

=== Marine weather ===
In winter, the St. Lawrence River begins producing ice in December between Montreal and Quebec City. The prevailing winds and currents push this ice towards the estuary, and it reaches the east of Les Méchins at the end of December. Ice covers the entire Gulf of St. Lawrence in January and February.

Ice helps navigation by preventing the formation of waves, and therefore spray, and prevents the icing of ships.

=== Watershed ===
With the draining of the Champlain Sea, due to a rebounding continent from the Last Glacial Maximum, the St. Lawrence River was formed. The Champlain Sea lasted from about 13,000 to about 10,000 years ago and was continuously shrinking during that time, a process that continues today. The head of the St. Lawrence River, near Lake Ontario, is home to the Thousand Islands.

Today, the St. Lawrence River begins at the outflow of Lake Ontario and flows adjacent to Cape Vincent, Gananoque, Clayton, Alexandria Bay, Brockville, Morristown, Ogdensburg, Massena, Cornwall, Montreal, Trois-Rivières, and Quebec City before draining into the Gulf of St. Lawrence, often given as the largest estuary in the world. The estuary begins at the eastern tip of Île d'Orléans, just downstream from Quebec City. The river becomes tidal around Quebec City.

The St. Lawrence River runs 3,058 km (1,900 mi) from the farthest headwater to the mouth and 1,197 km (743.78 mi) from the outflow of Lake Ontario. These numbers include the estuary; without the estuary, the length from Lake Ontario is 500 km (311 mi). The farthest headwater is the North River in the Mesabi Range at Hibbing, Minnesota. Its drainage area, which includes the Great Lakes, the world's largest system of freshwater lakes, is 1,344,200 km^{2} (518,998.5 sq mi), of which 839,200 km^{2} (324,016.9 sq mi) are in Canada and 194,981.6 sq mi (505,000 km^{2}) are in the United States. The basin covers parts of Ontario and Quebec in Canada, parts of Minnesota, Wisconsin, Illinois, Indiana, Ohio, Pennsylvania, New York, Vermont, and nearly the entirety of Michigan in the United States. The average discharge below the Saguenay River is 16,800 cubic metres per second (590,000 cu ft/s). At Quebec City, it is 12,101 m^{3}/s (427,300 cu ft/s). The average discharge at the river's source, the outflow of Lake Ontario, is 7,410 m^{3}/s (262,000 cu ft/s).

The St. Lawrence River includes Lake Saint Francis at Salaberry-de-Valleyfield, Lake Saint-Louis south of Montreal, and Lake Saint Pierre east of Montreal. It encompasses four archipelagoes: the Thousand Islands chain near Alexandria Bay, New York, and Kingston, Ontario; the Hochelaga Archipelago, including the Island of Montreal and Île Jésus (Laval); the Lake St. Pierre Archipelago (classified a biosphere world reserve by the UNESCO in 2000), and the smaller Mingan Archipelago. Other islands include Île d'Orléans near Quebec City and Anticosti Island north of the Gaspé. It is the second-longest river in Canada.

Lake Champlain and the Ottawa, Richelieu, Saint-Maurice, Saint-François, Chaudière, and Saguenay Rivers drain into the St. Lawrence.

The St. Lawrence River is in a seismically active zone where fault reactivation is believed to occur along late Proterozoic to early Paleozoic normal faults related to the opening of the Iapetus Ocean. The faults in the area are rift-related and comprise the Saint Lawrence rift system.

According to the United States Geological Survey, the St. Lawrence Valley is a physiographic province of the larger Appalachian division, containing the Champlain section. However, in Canada, where most of the valley is, it is instead considered part of a distinct St. Lawrence Lowlands physiographic division and not part of the Appalachian division.

=== Sources ===
The source of the North River in the Mesabi Range in Minnesota (Seven Beaver Lake) is considered to be the source of the St. Lawrence River. Because it crosses so many lakes, the water system frequently changes its name. From source to mouth, the names are:

- North River
- Saint Louis River
- Lake Superior
- St. Marys River
- Lake Huron
- St. Clair River
- Lake St. Clair
- Detroit River
- Lake Erie
- Niagara River
- Lake Ontario

The St. Lawrence River also passes through Lake Saint-Louis and Lake Saint-Pierre in Quebec.

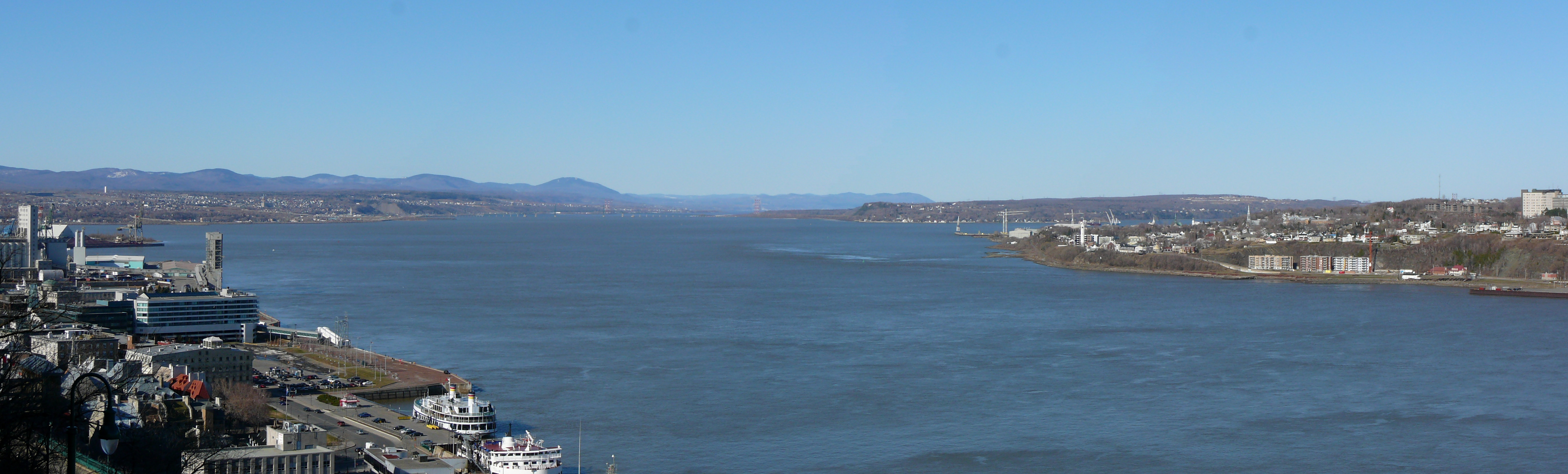
Looking downstream: Quebec City (left), St. Lawrence River, Île d'Orléans (center), Lévis (right), Laurentian Mountains (background).

== Tributaries ==
The St. Lawrence River is the largest tributary of the Great Lakes.

The St. Lawrence River tributaries are listed upstream from the mouth. The major tributaries of the interlake sections are also shown, as well as the major rivers that flow into the Great Lakes. Great Lakes tributaries are listed in alphabetical order.

The list includes all tributaries with a drainage area of at least 1,000 km^{2} and an average flow of more than 10 m^{3}/sec.

Left tributary	Right tributary	Length (km)	Basin size (km^{2})	Average discharge (m^{3}/s)
St. Lawrence River
Godbout		112	1,930.1	44.4
Frankquelin		67.5	582.9	12.1
Manicouagan		221	45,908	1,020
Outardes		499	19,057	400
	Mitis	51	1,806.4	37
Betsiamites		444	18,984.1	366.7
Laval		42	641.6	13
Rivière du Sault aux Cochons		128	1,946	38.7
	Rimouski	119.2	1,635	30.8
Portneuf		55	2,457.6	52.3
Rivière des Escoumins		84	810.5	17.5
	Rivière des Trois-Pistoles	43	966	18.4
	Verte		507.9	10.2
Saguenay		170	87,635.4	1,893.9
	Rivière du Loup	101.3	1,059	18.5
Malbaie		161	1,861.1	39.1
	Rivière-Ouelle	73.4	850.6	16.8
Rivière du Gouffre		76.1	1,010.1	23.5
	Montmagny (Rivière du Sud)	86.5	1,994.6	46.7
Sainte-Anne		97	1,077	31.5
Montmorency		103.7	1,157.6	35.6
Saint-Charles		25	483.4	13.6
	Etchemin	124	1,443.4	34.5
	Chaudière	185	6,682	146.4
Jacques-Cartier		178	2,515	71.3
	Rivière du Chêne	80.6	855.9	21.1
Sainte-Anne		123	2,753.3	73.4
Batiscan		196	4,690	107.1
	Bécancour	210	2,607	63.2
Saint-Maurice		563	41,994.3	730
	Nicolet	137	3,380	77.8
Rivière du Loup		102	1,642.9	27.8
	Saint François	218	10,230	237.8
	Yamaska	160	4,784	110.1
Maskinongé		40	1,205.7	21.3
	Richelieu	124	23,717.7	455.8
L'Assomption		200	4,220	78.6
Ottawa		1,271	147,405.8	1,948.8
Châteauguay		121	2,466.7	43.8
	Rivière aux Saumons	70.6	1,065.2	20.2
	St. Regis River	138	2,219.6	44
	Raquette	235	3,250	74.4
	Grasse	117	1,657.9	32.9
	Oswegatchie	220	4,120	88.3
Gananoque			909.5	12.2
Niagara
	Tonawanda Creek	140	1,700	27.2
Detroit
	Rouge	204	1,580	10.7
St. Clair River
Sydenham		165	2,727.6	14.3
	Belle	118.3	556.4	4.4
	Black	130.4	1,821.9	9.2
Great Lakes
Lake Ontario
Black		201	4,964.8	159.5
Credit		90	1,000	8.1
Genesee		253	6,507.7	107.5
Humber		100	1,008.4	7.5
Moira		98	2,736	32.6
Napanee		60	1,099.2	12.6
Niagara		58	682,350.9	5,885
Oak Orchard		95.2	804.3	13
Oswego		38	13,266	255
Salmon		135	1,534	18.2
Salmon		71	820.5	21.9
Sandy Creek		53	501.9	11
Trent		90	13,014.7	154.6
Welland		140	1,136.4	8.7
Lake Erie
Black		68	1,217	9.8
Buffalo		13	1,186.4	17.4
Cattaraugus Creek		109	1,510.1	24
Cuyahoga		136.6	2,377.6	29
Detroit		45	595,052	5,300
Grand		280	6,763.8	45
Grand		165.3	1,873.6	23.8
Huron		210	2,145.2	20.4
Huron		24	1,055.6	8.8
Maumee		220	16,460	164.1
Portage		66.8	1,574.6	11.3
Raisin		224	2,780	22.8
Sandusky		214	3,262.1	26.1
Lake St. Clair
Clinton		134	1,970.9	19.8
St. Clair River		65.2	583,508.7	5,200
Thames		273	5,825	52.9
Lake Huron
Au Gres		75.2	1,262	7.2
Au Sable		222	5,468.5	36.4
Ausable		64	1,142	8.1
Cheboygan		61	3,880.1	32.5
French		110	19,100	207
Garden			1,061.7	14.6
Magnetawan		175	3,041.9	24.7
Maitland		150	2,592	21.4
Mississagi		266	9,270	118
Musquash		29	4,591.7	43.7
Nottawasaga		120	3,082.4	18.8
Saginaw–Shiawassee		216	15,525.6	136.7
St. Marys River		119.9	211,833.3	2,135
Sauble			1,109.7	7.6
Saugeen		160	4,120	81.8
Seguin		40	1,023	9.7
Serpent			1,495	10.2
Severn		30	6,039.2	56.9
Spanish		338	13,368.3	150
Thessalon			1,125.4	8.3
Thunder Bay		121.3	3,382.1	19.2
Whitefish			1,318.9	7.2
Lake Michigan
Burns Waterway		35.6	1,033.2	8.9
Calumet		66	1,183.8	10
Cedar		108	1,158.3	6.9
Elk		121	1,379.5	12.5
Escanaba		84	2,390	28.1
Ford		174	1,414.7	10.7
Fox		320	16,650	143.8
Grand		406	15,206.6	143
Kalamazoo		210	5,230	52.8
Manistee		310	4,600	47.5
Manistique		114.6	3,780	52.7
Manitowac		57.6	1,552.4	10.6
Menomonee		187	10,569	99.6
Milwaukee		167	2,271.5	17.1
Muskegon		348	7,029.8	60.8
Oconto		91.6	2,474.9	19.8
Pere Marquette		102.8	2,074.6	18
Peshtigo		219	2,856.3	21.9
Shebaygan		130	1,226	8.8
St. Joseph River		340	12,130	142.2
White		38	1,458	13
Lake Superior
Agawa		102	1,057.8	29.1
Aguasabon		70	964.3	16.8
Bad		119.6	2,659.8	44.7
Batchawana		95	1,396.1	36.7
Black		66.1	724.3	15.1
Black Sturgeon		72	2,815.6	43.1
Brule		65	699.7	10
Chipewa		40	920.9	22.4
Dog		50.9	1,333.5	28
Goulais		70	2,071	42.1
Gravel			700.1	12.1
Kaministiquia		95	7,903.1	99.4
Little Pic			1,459.1	21
Magpie–Michipicoten		81	7,446.7	145.8
Montreal		130	3,452	84
Montreal		76.9	861.9	12.8
Nemadji		113.9	1,158.4	18.6
Nipigon		48	25,645.4	383.6
Old Woman			558.8	10.9
Ontonagon		40	3,720.2	75.8
Pic		188	6,430	109.9
Pigeon		80	1,610.6	25.1
Presque Isle		67.8	1,088.9	20.3
Pukaskwa		80	1,308.3	24.6
Saint Louis		309	9,410	146.7
Sand		56	537.7	13
Steel		170	1,298.8	18.3
Sturgeon		171	1,892.2	43.1
Tahquamenon		143.4	2,258	46.3
Two Hearted		38	575	11.7
White		140	5,228.3	95.7
Wolf			650.2	10

== Discharge ==
Year	Average discharge	
Year	Quebec City	Pointe-des-Monts
2007	10,967 m^{3}/s (387,300 cu ft/s)	16,600 m^{3}/s (590,000 cu ft/s)
2008	12,550 m^{3}/s (443,000 cu ft/s)	18,100 m^{3}/s (640,000 cu ft/s)
2009	12,166 m^{3}/s (429,600 cu ft/s)	17,227 m^{3}/s (608,400 cu ft/s)
2010	11,691 m^{3}/s (412,900 cu ft/s)	16,187 m^{3}/s (571,600 cu ft/s)
2011	13,221 m^{3}/s (466,900 cu ft/s)	18,616 m^{3}/s (657,400 cu ft/s)
2012	11,291 m^{3}/s (398,700 cu ft/s)	16,704 m^{3}/s (589,900 cu ft/s)
2013	12,090 m^{3}/s (427,000 cu ft/s)	17,098 m^{3}/s (603,800 cu ft/s)
2014	12,563 m^{3}/s (443,700 cu ft/s)	18,059 m^{3}/s (637,700 cu ft/s)
2015	11,425 m^{3}/s (403,500 cu ft/s)	17,310 m^{3}/s (611,000 cu ft/s)
2016	12,411 m^{3}/s (438,300 cu ft/s)	17,563 m^{3}/s (620,200 cu ft/s)
2017	14,309 m^{3}/s (505,300 cu ft/s)	19,213 m^{3}/s (678,500 cu ft/s)
2018	13,220 m^{3}/s (467,000 cu ft/s)	16,884 m^{3}/s (596,300 cu ft/s)
2019	15,154 m^{3}/s (535,200 cu ft/s)	21,004 m^{3}/s (741,700 cu ft/s)
2020	14,113 m^{3}/s (498,400 cu ft/s)	18,996 m^{3}/s (670,800 cu ft/s)
2021	11,344 m^{3}/s (400,600 cu ft/s)	16,093 m^{3}/s (568,300 cu ft/s)
2022	13,135 m^{3}/s (463,900 cu ft/s)	17,902 m^{3}/s (632,200 cu ft/s)
2023	13,560 m^{3}/s (479,000 cu ft/s)	18,799 m^{3}/s (663,900 cu ft/s)

== Biodiversity ==
The diversity of the St. Lawrence River includes:

- 19 species of marine mammals
- More than 230 species of birds
- Nearly 35 species of amphibians and reptiles
- 200 species of freshwater and saltwater fish (including 19 sharks and rays)
- 2200 invertebrates in the estuary and its gulf (sponges, jellyfish, corals, crustaceans, etc.)
- Nearly 2000 vascular plants

=== Marine mammals ===
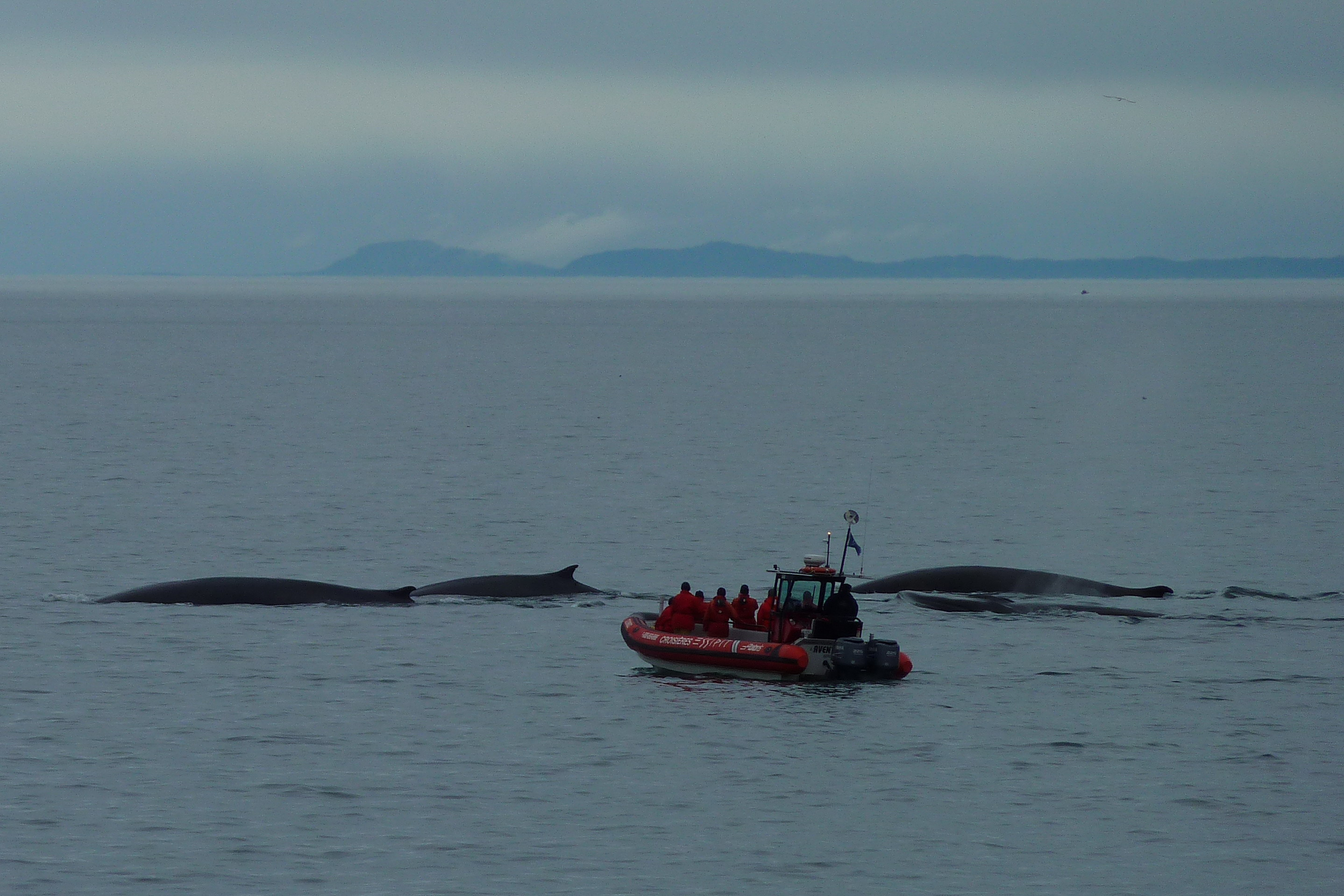
fin whales off Tadoussac

Large marine mammals travel in all the seas of the earth. The observation of these animals concern fishermen and shipping industry, exercise a fascination for laymen, and are subjects for study by scientists.

Thirteen species of cetaceans frequent the waters of the estuary and the Gulf of St. Lawrence:

1. Northern bottlenose whale
2. Delphinapterus leucas (Beluga Whale)
3. Sperm whale
4. Atlantic white-sided dolphin
5. White-beaked dolphin
6. Orca
7. Long-finned pilot whale
8. Phocoena phocoena (Harbour Porpoise)
9. North Atlantic right whale
10. Common minke whale
11. Blue whale
12. Humpback whale
13. Fin whale

== History ==
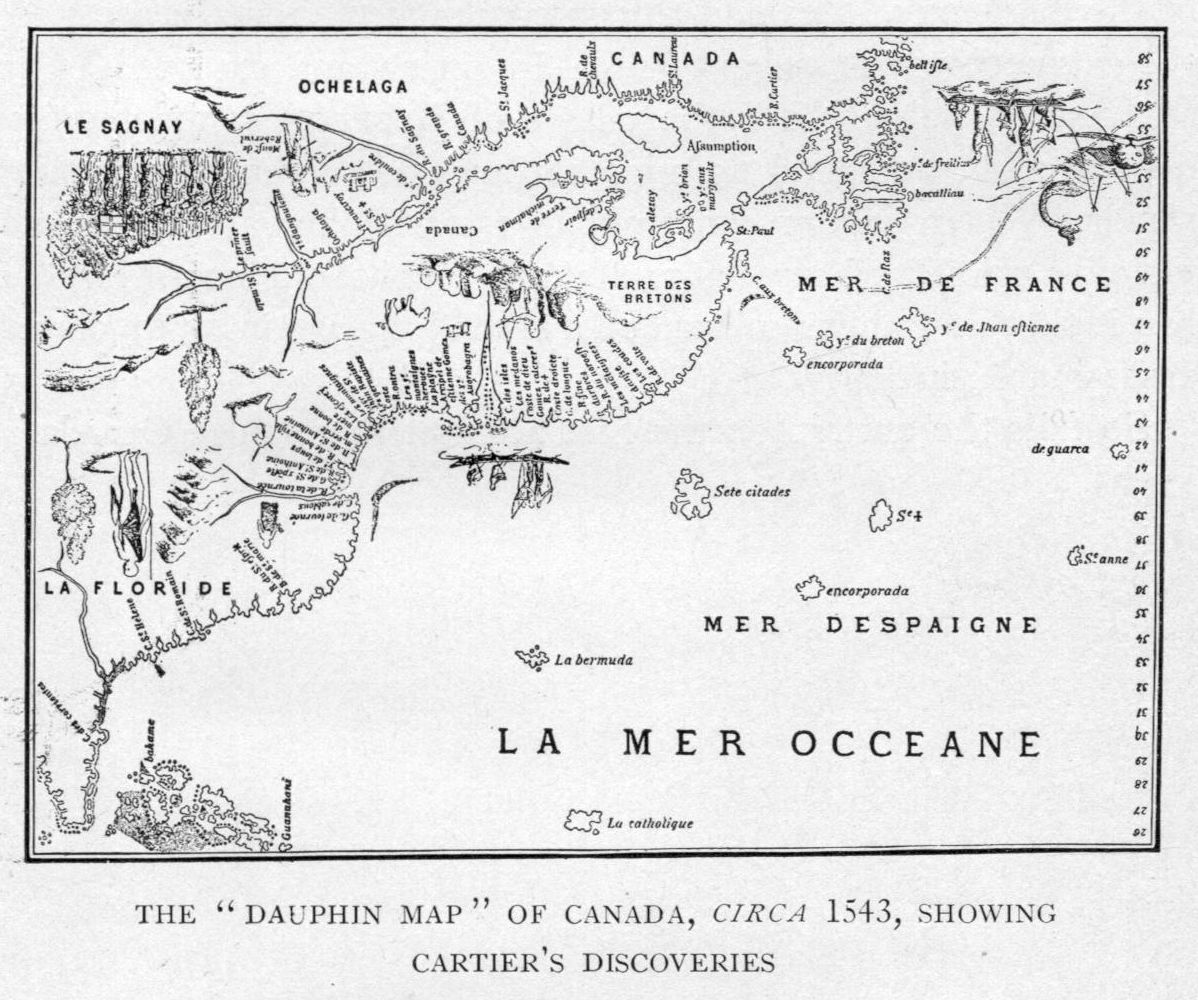
Reproduction of map of 1543 showing Cartier's discoveries (c. 1909)

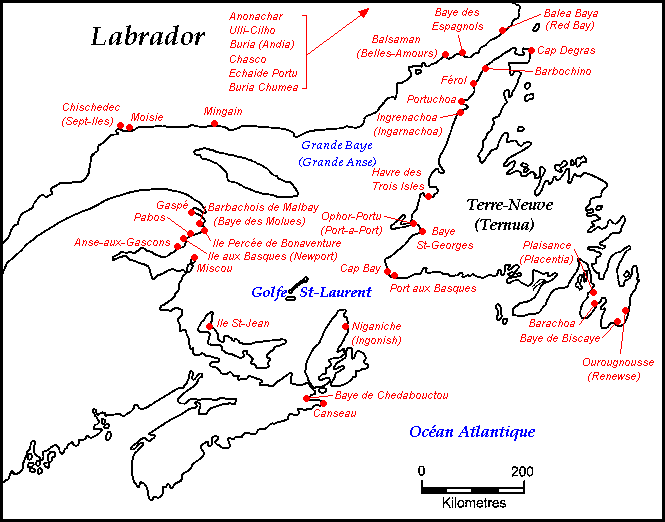
Basque settlements and sites dating from the 16th and 17th centuries

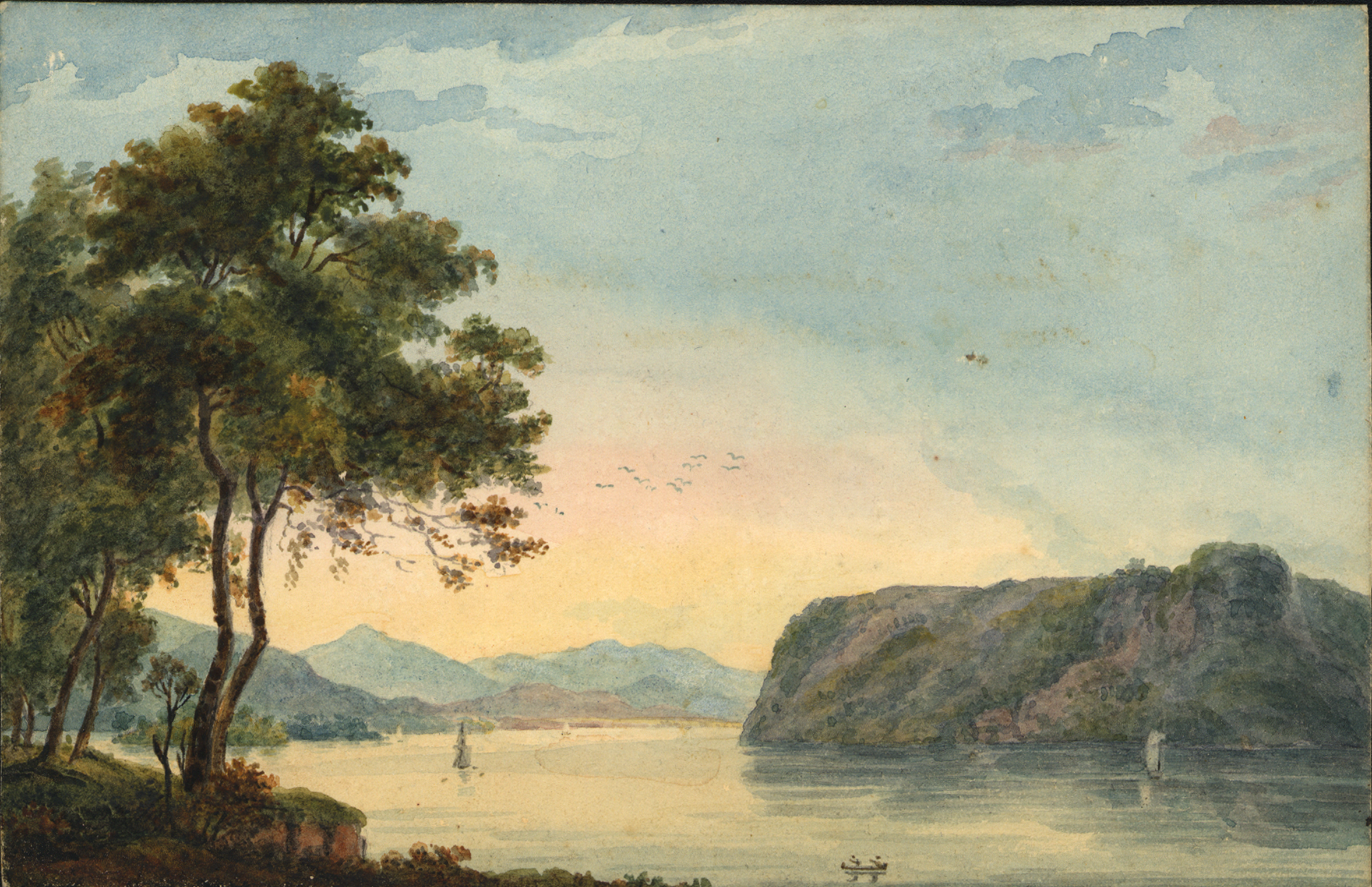
Watercolour (c. 1792) by Elizabeth Simcoe depicting a bend in the St. Lawrence River in Quebec

=== First Nations ===
Flowing through and adjacent to numerous Indigenous homelands, the river was a primary thoroughfare for many peoples. Beginning in Dawnland at the Gulf of St. Lawrence, the river borders Mi'kma'ki in the South (what is today known as the Canadian Maritimes), and Nitassinan in the North, the national territory of the Innu people. On the south shore beyond the Mi'kmaw district of Gespe'gewa'ki, the river passes Wolastokuk (the Maliseet homeland), Pαnawαhpskewahki (the Penobscot homeland), and Ndakinna (the Abenaki homeland). Continuing, the river passes through the former country of the St. Lawrence Iroquois and then three of the six homelands of the Haudenosaunee: the Mohawk or Kanienʼkehá꞉ka, the Oneida or Onyota'a:ka, and the Onondaga or Onöñda'gaga'.

In the early 17th century, the Wendat Nation migrated from their original country of Huronia to what is now known as Nionwentsïo centred around Wendake. Nionwentsïo occupies both the north and south shores of the river, overlapping with Nitassinan and the more western Wabanaki or Dawnland countries. Adjacent on the north shore is the Atikamekw territorial homeland of Nitaskinan and, upstream, the further reaches of Anishinaabewaki, specifically the homelands of the Algonquin and Mississauga Nations.

=== European exploration ===
The Norse explored the Gulf of St. Lawrence in the 11th century and were followed by fifteenth- and early sixteenth-century European mariners, such as John Cabot, and the brothers Gaspar and Miguel Corte-Real. The first European explorer known to have sailed up the St. Lawrence River itself was Jacques Cartier. At that time, the land along the river described as "about two leagues, a mountain as tall as a heap of wheat" was inhabited by the St. Lawrence Iroquoians. During Cartier's second voyage in 1535, because Cartier arrived in the estuary on Saint Lawrence's feast day 10 August, he named it the Gulf of Saint Lawrence.

The St. Lawrence River is today partly within the U.S. and as such is that country's sixth oldest surviving European place-name.

=== Early colonists ===
The earliest regular Europeans in the area were the Basques, who came to the St Lawrence Gulf and River in pursuit of whales from the early 16th century. The Basque whalers and fishermen traded with indigenous Americans and set up settlements, leaving vestiges all over the coast of eastern Canada and deep into the St. Lawrence River. Basque commercial and fishing activity reached its peak before the Armada Invencible's disaster (1588), when the Basque whaling fleet was confiscated by King Philip II of Spain. Initially, the whaling galleons from Labourd were not affected by the Spanish defeat.

Until the early 17th century, the French used the name Rivière du Canada to designate the St. Lawrence upstream to Montreal and the Ottawa River after Montreal. The St. Lawrence River served as the main route for European exploration of the North American interior, first pioneered by French explorer Samuel de Champlain.

=== Colonial control ===
Control of the river was crucial to British strategy to capture New France in the Seven Years' War. Having captured Louisbourg in 1758, the British sailed up to Quebec the following year thanks to charts drawn up by James Cook. British troops were ferried via the St. Lawrence to attack the city from the west, which they successfully did at the Battle of the Plains of Abraham. The river was used again by the British to defeat the French siege of Quebec under the Chevalier de Lévis in 1760.

In 1809, the first steamboat to ply its trade on the St. Lawrence was built and operated by John Molson and associates, a scant two years after Fulton's steam-powered navigation of the Hudson River. The Accommodation with ten passengers made her maiden voyage from Montreal to Quebec City in 66 hours, for 30 of which she was at anchor. She had a keel of 75 feet, and a length overall of 85 feet. The cost of a ticket was eight dollars upstream, and nine dollars down. She had berths that year for twenty passengers. Within a decade, daily service was available in the hotly-contested Montreal-Quebec route.

Because of the virtually impassable Lachine Rapids, the St. Lawrence was once continuously navigable only as far as Montreal. Opened in 1825, the Lachine Canal was the first to allow ships to pass the rapids. An extensive system of canals and locks, known as the St. Lawrence Seaway, was officially opened on 26 June 1959 by Elizabeth II (representing Canada) and President Dwight D. Eisenhower (representing the United States). The Seaway (including the Welland Canal) now permits ocean-going vessels to pass all the way to Lake Superior.

=== Modern Canada ===
Alcoa, Reynolds Metals Company, and General Motors (GM) Central Foundry operated along the St. Lawrence River and its tributaries for decades. The Alcoa plant opened in 1903, and Reynolds and GM began operations in the late 1950s. These facilities released toxic substances into the St. Lawrence River and the surrounding area, including PCBs, PAHs, cyanide, fluoride, and dioxins.

During the Second World War, the Battle of the St. Lawrence involved submarine and anti-submarine actions throughout the lower St. Lawrence River and the entire Gulf of St. Lawrence, Strait of Belle Isle and Cabot Strait from May to October 1942, September 1943, and again in October and November 1944. During this time, German U-boats sank several merchant marine ships and three Canadian warships.

In the late 1970s, the river was the subject of a successful ecological campaign (called "Save the River"), originally responding to planned development by the United States Army Corps of Engineers. The campaign was organized, among others, by Abbie Hoffman.

== In popular culture ==
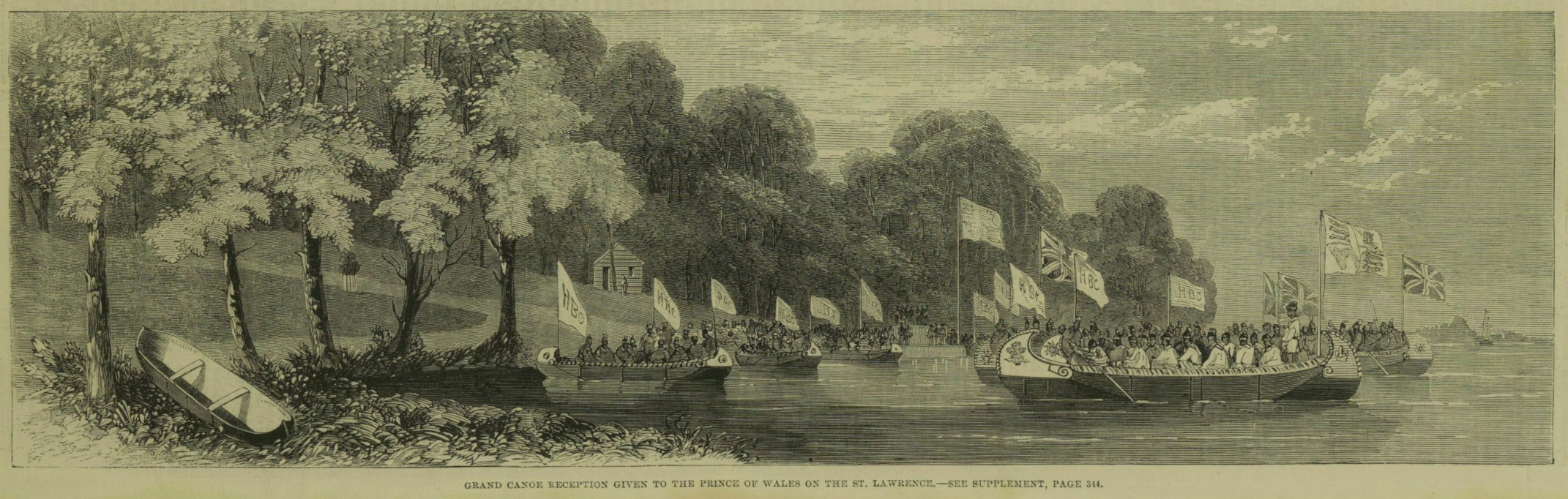
Grand canoe reception for the Prince of Wales on the St. Lawrence, 1860

- Gatien Lapointe, Ode au Saint-Laurent, Éditions du Jour, Montréal, 1963, Paradis, A. (1963), report, 3 pages.
- The river was the setting for the Canadian television drama series Seaway.
- It is the namesake of Saint-Laurent Herald.
- In 1980, Jacques Cousteau filmed Cries from the Deep and St. Lawrence: Stairway to the Sea.
- The 1993 Canadian animated short film The Mighty River was about the river.
- The novel and film Black Robe are set primarily on the St. Lawrence River during the 17th century.
- The 1941 children's book Paddle-to-the-Sea, and the film Paddle to the Sea, involve passage through the St. Lawrence River.
- The St. Lawrence River is mentioned in the 1967 single Canadian Railroad Trilogy by Gordon Lightfoot.

== See also ==
- List of longest rivers of the United States (by main stem)
- List of longest rivers of Canada
- List of Quebec rivers
- List of Ontario rivers
- List of New York rivers
- List of crossings of the St. Lawrence River

== Bibliography ==
- Creighton, Donald Grant (2002) [1937], The empire of the St. Lawrence: a study in commerce and politics (reprint), University of Toronto Press, ISBN 0-8020-8418-4
- Dawson, Samuel Edward (2003), The Saint Lawrence: Its Basin and Border-lands, Heritage Books, ISBN 0-7884-2252-9
- Denison, Merrill (1955). The Barley and the Stream: The Molson Story. McClelland & Stewart Limited.
- Ellis, William S. (May 1980). "Canada's Highway to the Sea". National Geographic. Vol. 157, no. 5. pp. 586–623. ISSN 0027-9358. OCLC 643483454.
- McNeese, Tim (2005), The St. Lawrence River, Chelsea House Publishers, ISBN 0791082458
- Parham, Claire Puccia (2009), The St. Lawrence Seaway and Power Project : an oral history of the greatest construction show on earth, Syracuse University, ISBN 978-0-8156-0913-1
- Stagg, Ronald (2010), The Golden Dream: A History of the St. Lawrence Seaway, Dundurn Press, ISBN 978-1-55002-887-4
