= Constant Awashish =

Atikamekw chief

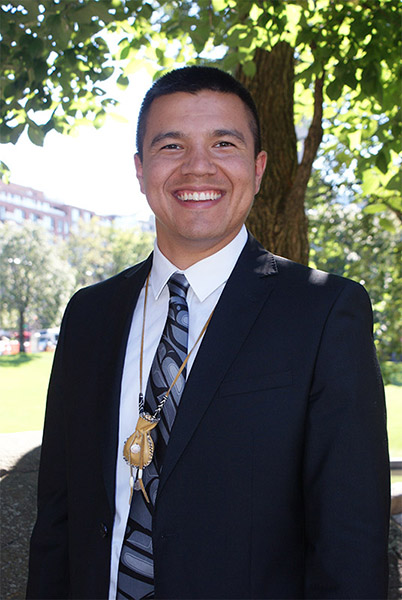
- Awashish in 2016
- Born: 1981 (age 43–44); La Tuque, Quebec
- Occupation: Grand Chief of the Conseil de la Nation Atikamekw
- Years active: 2014-present

Constant Awashish (born in 1981 in La Tuque, Quebec) is an Atikamekw chief. Since 2014, he is the Grand Chief of the Conseil de la Nation Atikamekw, the tribal council uniting the three Atikamekw Nations. He is known to have declared the sovereignty on their ancestral territory, the Nitaskinan, with the other Atikamekw chiefs.

== Biography ==
Awashish was born in La Tuque, Quebec, in 1981. He was mainly raised by his maternal grandparents on the Indian Reserve of Opitciwan in the northern Mauricie region of Quebec. He completed his elementary and high school studies in La Tuque. He received a law degree from the University of Ottawa, specializing in the rights of the Indigenous people and their territorial rights, the legislation of indigenous entities, and corporate law.

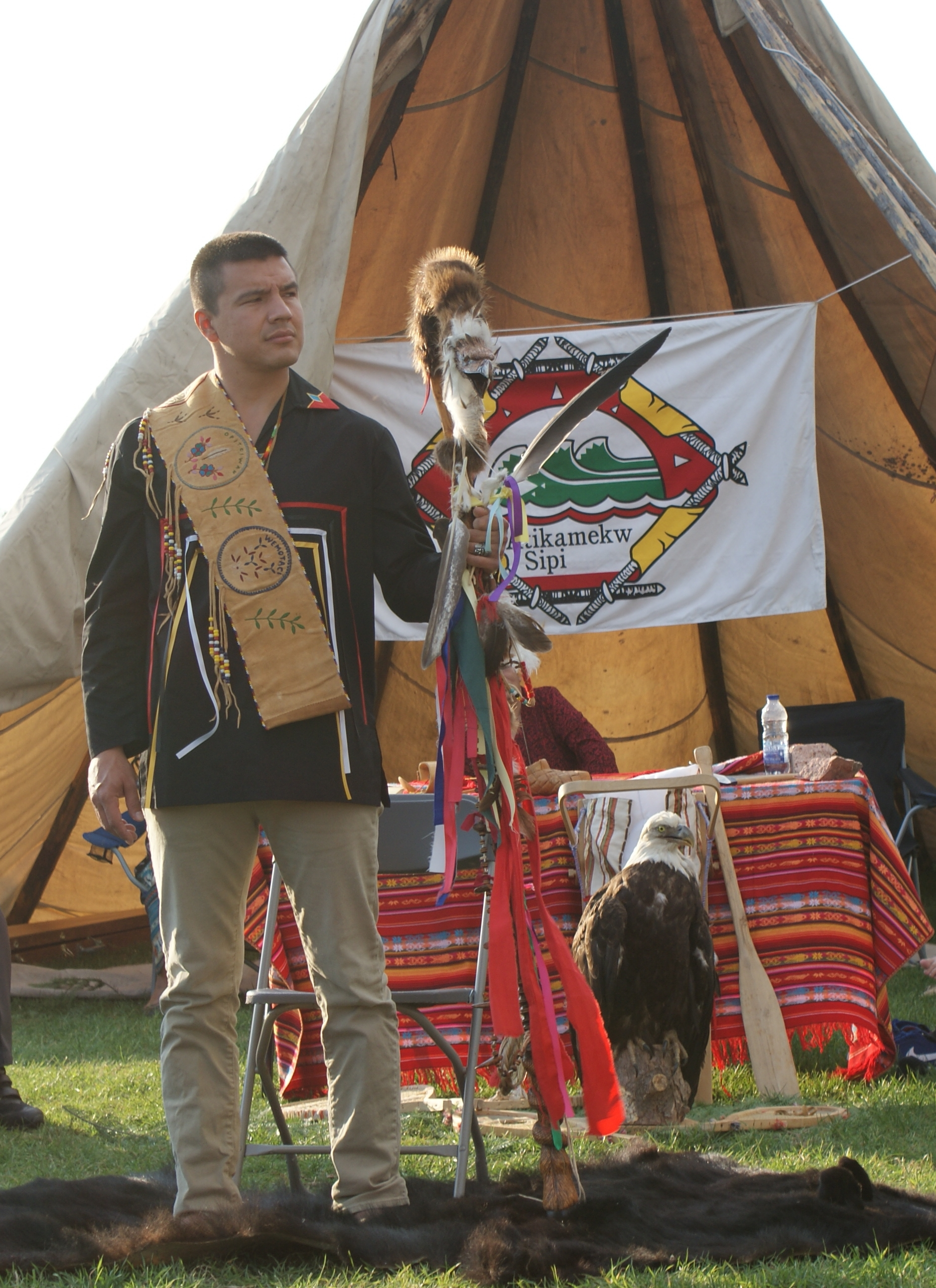
Awashish during his swearing as Grand Chief of the Conseil de la Nation Atikamekw on 28 September 2014

During the elections on 2 September 2014, he was elected Grand Chief of the Conseil de la Nation Atikamekw, the tribal council uniting the three Atikamekw Nations, succeeding Eva Ottawa. As such, he is also the chairman of the corporation of the Conseil de la Nation Atikamekw.

A few days later, the Atikamekw chiefs declared unilaterally their sovereignty on their ancestral territory, the Nitaskinan, by a comprehensive claim. This territory covers 80,000 km^{2} (30,000 sq. mi.) to the north of Trois-Rivières. The Atikamekw never ceased or sold their territory during the numbered treaties.
