= Jean-François Bélisle =

Canadian museum director, curator

- Born: 1975, May 7
- Education: Bachelor of Arts (2004) and Master of Arts degrees (2007) in art history from Concordia University in Montreal
- Known for: Museum director, curator
- Spouse: Alexandra Hamel
- Children: 2
- Awards: Recipient of the Médaille de l'Assemblée nationale, an honor awarded by the National Assembly of Quebec to individuals or organizations in recognition of their significant contributions to society. Recipients of this medal are acknowledged for their outstanding achievements and dedication. Awarded in August 2023 by François St-Louis

Jean-François Bélisle (born 1975) is the director and CEO of the National Gallery of Canada, appointed in 2023. When he was appointed, La Presse newspaper in Montreal praised his "broad expertise, his contagious dynamism and his knowledge of the Canadian museum environment". The minister of Canadian heritage, Pablo Rodriguez, praised his "wealth of experience as a curator and director of arts organizations at home and abroad".

== Career ==
Bélisle, the son of Micheline and J. Denis Bélisle, diplomats (his father is a collector and former Canadian ambassador to several African countries), received his Bachelor of Arts (2004) and Master of Arts degrees (2007) in art history from Concordia University in Montreal. Starting in the mid-1990s, he worked at the Sotheby's auction house in Geneva, and at the Iegor auction house in Montreal. He also worked at the Gail and Stephen A. Jarislowsky Canadian Art Research Institute in Montreal, at UNESCO in Paris, at the Prince of Asturias Foundation in Oviedo, Spain, as well as at the McCord Museum and at ‘’Ciel variable’’ magazine.

From 2007 till 2011, he was the executive director of the Association des galeries d’art contemporain (AGAC), a not-for-profit organization founded in 1985 that represents commercial Canadian art. At AGAC he developed various projects such as "Papier" (now "Plural"), created in 2007, Canada’s second largest art fair.

In 2011, Bélisle cofounded Arsenal contemporary art, a private art foundation with venues in Montreal (2011), Toronto (2013) and New York (2017) dedicated to helping contemporary Canadian artists reach a wider audience, then served as its executive director till 2016.

From 2016 till 2023, Bélisle served as executive director and chief curator of the Musée d’art de Joliette (MAJ) in Joliette, Quebec, northeast of Montreal. With his help, the MAJ expanded its presence, role, and profile in Canada and abroad, and was more inclusive, giving more space through exhibitions to indigenous people, such as a solo show of contemporary artist Joseph Tisiga (Kaska Dena First Nation) and examining, through contemporary interventions, the way a historical collection of bronze sculptures represented Indigenous people. He worked to mend interpersonal relationships as well. Following the tragic death of Indigenous Joyce Echaquan in Joliette in 2020, he brought the Anishinaabe director of the Lanaudière Native Friendship Center to the board of directors of the MAJ.

Bélisle has organized many contemporary art exhibitions and projects in Canada, the USA, Europe and China, among them Next, an exhibition of twenty important emerging artists in the United States (2014); Like Thunder Out of China, an exhibition featuring ten young contemporary Chinese artists (2014); Prism, a solo exhibition by Vancouver-based David Spriggs (2015); and E-Merge, an exhibition in collaboration with C2 Montreal on new media artists (2015);. He also has contributed articles to many catalogues on contemporary Canadian artists.

In 2023, Bélisle was appointed CEO of the National Gallery of Canada.

In 2023, he was elected president of the Canadian Art Museum Directors Organization; he has served on many boards. Bélisle also regularly participates in fine arts juries for provincial and national awards.

One of his first actions as Director was to ask for more money from the Federal government for the National Gallery of Canada - at least $10 million to be added to the gallery’s $45.8 million budget.

== Awards and honours ==
- Recipient of the Médaille de l'Assemblée nationale (2023).

== Controversy ==
The controversy at the National Gallery of Canada, as with other institutions, is over decolonization. The previous director of the gallery, Sasha Suda, tried to change the gallery into one that was more inclusive of the art, experiences and thinking of Indigenous, Black and other minorities. That meant firing curators and resignations as well as tensions with major collectors, which led to disruption of the museum and a public outcry. Bélisle's plan is to make "diversity" part of the existing program. According to Bélisle, its pursuit will be delivered through the gallery's choices in acquiring and exhibiting art rather than through corporate pronouncements.

We want the gallery to remain a place where the collections, the exhibitions and the experiences we facilitate are the vehicle for diversity, dialogue and inclusiveness,” Bélisle told MPs. “We’re going to make sure that artwork – rather than corporate policies – does the talking.

In an interview with Paul Wells, an Ottawa-based columnist, Bélisle said:

... what is decolonization? What would it entail? I’m not even sure I’m interested in thinking about it. I’m interested in building something, not de-building it.
