= André Quitich =

Indigenous Canadian politician (born 1951)

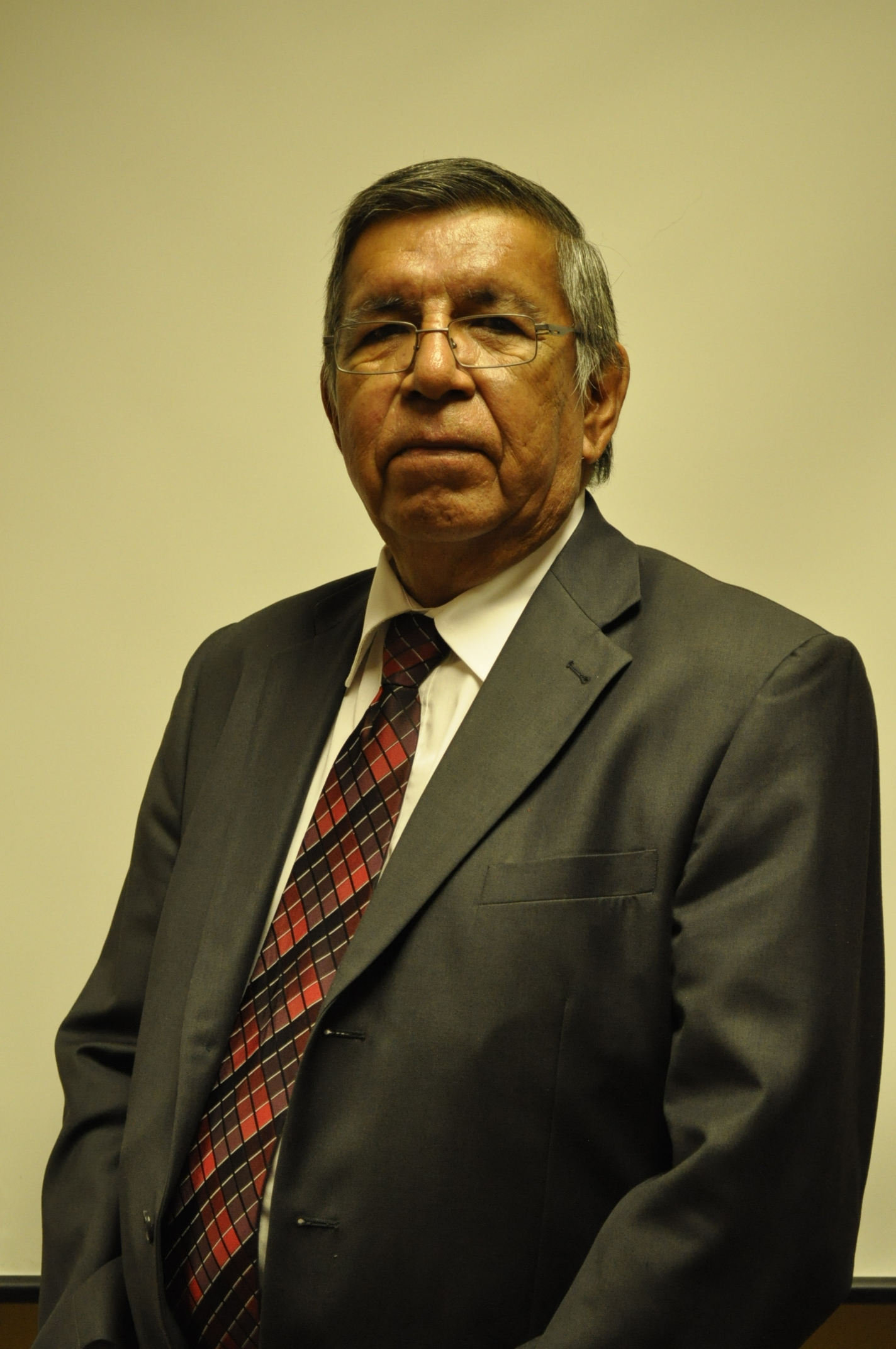
- André Quitich in 2013
- Born: André Quitich; November 10, 1951; Manawan, Quebec, Canada
- Occupation: Politician

Grand Chief of the Atikamekw Nation
- In office 27 August 2013 – 4 September 2014

André Quitich (born 1951) is an Atikamekw politician and administrator. He served as Grand Chief and President of the Atikamekw Nation from 2013 until 2014.

== Early life and educational career ==
Quitich was born in Manawan, Quebec, Canada. Over the course of 40 years, he worked for Otapi High School. He served as General Manager and Director of Administrative Services and Finance.

== Political career ==
From 2004 to 2007, he served as Deputy Negotiator in the Indigenous comprehensive claims. On August 27, 2013, he was elected Grand Chief and Chairman of the Atikamekw Nation. He seceded Eve Ottawa.

As Grand Chief and chairman, he played a key role in the comprehensive claims, helping the tribe acquire over 80,000 kilometers of territory in Nitaskinan.
