= Eruoma Awashish =

First Nations artist from Quebec (born 1980)

- Born: 1980 (age 45–46); Opitciwan, Quebec, Canada
- Citizenship: Atikamekw of Opitciwan and Canada
- Education: Université du Québec à Chicoutimi

Eruoma Awashish (born 1980) is an Atikamekw visual artist from Quebec.

== Early life and education ==
Awashish was born to a Quebecois mother and Atikamekw father. She was born and grew up in Opitciwan, a small community near the Gouin Reservoir in northern Quebec.

Awashish attended the Université du Québec à Chicoutimi, where she earned a bachelor's degree in interdisciplinary art.

== Career ==
Awashish had her first solo exhibition, entitled Reliques et passages, in 2015 at the Canadian Guild of Crafts in Montreal. She also began printing some of her art on t-shirts, as a way to make her art both more accessible to her community and as a way to make a living. The exhibition was revived in Lachine in 2023.

In 2020, Awashish was commissioned to paint a mural at the Musée d’art de Joliette in honor of Joyce Echaquan and her family. Awashish has also painted a portrait of Echaquan, which has been used in relation with demands to reform Quebec's healthcare system to better care for indigenous patients.

In her March 2024 exhibition, Kakike Ickote – Feu éternel, Awashish explored the impact of Catholicism on First Nations communities, reappropriating Catholic iconography and symbols for a First Nations context.

In 2025, Awashish became the first First Nations artist to be a finalist for the MNBAQ Contemporary Art Award.

=== Public art ===
From June to October 2023, Awashish was included in the public art exhibition PASSAGES INSOLITES in Quebec.

From January to March 2025, Les Fabuloscopes, a piece by Awashish and La Camaraderie, was installed as part of Lumino, a series of outdoor art exhibits in Montreal.

Awashish is one of several Atikamekw artists who are creating artwork for a new federal building in Shawinigan.

== Personal life ==
Awashish is based out of Pekuakami (Lac-Saint-Jean) as of 2025. She has one daughter.

== Exhibitions ==
=== Solo exhibitions ===
- Reliques et passages (2015, Canadian Guild of Crafts)
- Montreal Fine Arts Museum (late 2017-early 2018)
- Kakike Ickote – Feu éternel (March 2024, Galerie d'art du Parc, Trois-Rivières)

=== Group exhibitions ===
- Of Tobacco and Sweetgrass: Where Our Dreams Are (2019, Musée d’art de Joliette)
- "Nimisak otci / Pour mes sœurs" in MNBAQ Contemporary Art Award exhibition (February-April 2025, Musée national des beaux-arts du Québec)

== Awards ==
- 2025 MNBAQ Contemporary Art Award, for Kiwew/Elle entre chez elle
