= Nitassinan =

Ancestral homeland of the Innu, Canada

Coordinates: 52°49′9.8″N 67°11′53.3″W

Nitassinan ᓂᑕᔅᓯᓇᓐ
- Time immemorial–1763 (as a State)
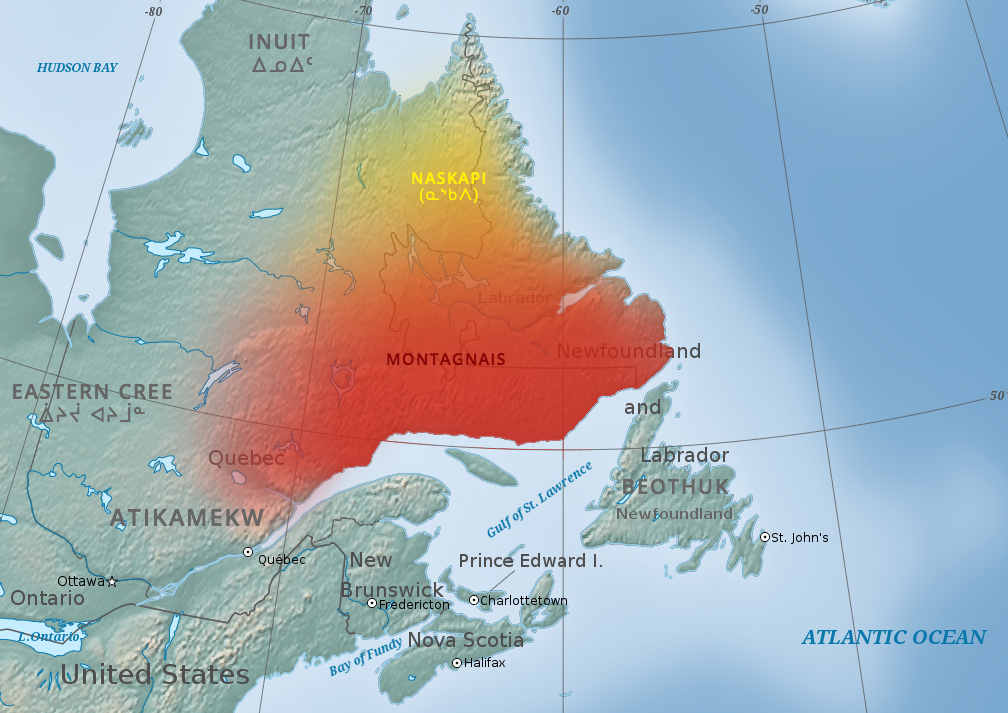
- Map of Nitassinan and St'aschinuw, Naskapi Country, in Canada (Quebec and Labrador)
- Status: Unrecognized / former country
- Common languages: French, Innu-aimun, English, LSQ, ASL
- Demonym: Innu
- History
  - Established: Time immemorial
  - Indian Act: 1876
  - Disestablished: 1763 (as a State)
- Today part of: Quebec & Labrador, Canada

Innu, Ilnu / assi "person" / "land"
- Person: Innu / Ilnu
- People: Innut / Innuat / Ilnuatsh
- Language: Innu-aimun
- Country: Nitassinan

Nitassinan (Innu: ᓂᑕᔅᓯᓇᓐ) is the ancestral homeland, or country, of the Innu, an Indigenous people of Eastern Quebec and Labrador, Canada. Nitassinan means "our land" in the Innu language. The territory covers the eastern portion of the Labrador peninsula. In the northern reaches of Nitassinan lies St'aschinuw (Naskapi: ᒋᑦ ᐊᔅᒋᓄᐤ), the Naskapi homeland.

The first interactions with Europeans were with the Vikings who referred to the Innu as the Skræling. Alongside Helluland (probably eastern Inuit Nunangat) and Vinland (probably Newfoundland), the Greenlandic Norse called the Labrador region of Innu Country Markland.

== Etymology ==
Nitassinan and, the more restrained term Innu Assi, mean "our land" and "Innu Country," respectively, in Innu-aimun. Both centre the root assi ("land"), originating from Proto-Algonquian *axskiy, relating it to the aski in Nitaskinan, Ojibwemowin's aki, and the Istchee in Eeyou Istchee, (Note: (/iːjoʊ̯ ɪst͡ʃi/, Northern East Cree: ᐄᔨᔨᐤ ᐊᔅᒌ Iiyiyiu Aschii /ijɪjɪu əstʃi/, Southern East Cree: ᐄᔨᔫ ᐊᔅᒌ Iiyiyuu Aschii /ijɪju əstʃi/ or ᐄᓅ ᐊᔅᒌ Iinuu Aschii /inu əstʃi/, all meaning 'The People's Land'; French: [iju istʃi])) each meaning "land" as well.

Nitassinan means "our (excl.) land". It is formed by attaching the prefix ni- ("I; we") and the suffix -(i)nan ("us, but not yours") to the root aski, forming the possessive. This construction is seen in neighbouring Algonquian languages like Nehiromowin, Anishinaabemowin, and Plains Cree,. Indeed, Atikamekw and Abenaki use similar constructions to refer to their homelands: Nitaskinan and Ndakinna, respectively.
