= North River (Minnesota) =

- Source of the North River

Location
- Country: United States
- State: Minnesota
- County: Lake County, St. Louis County

Physical characteristics
- Source
  - location: Greenwood Lake West
  - coordinates: 47.5718606°N 91.746272°W
- Mouth
  - location: Babbitt SE
  - coordinates: 47.5132524°N 91.7954433°W
- Length: 6 miles (9.7 km)

Basin features
- River system: St. Louis River

The North River is a river, approximately 6 miles (9.6 km) long, in northeastern Minnesota, the United States. Along with the East River, it is one of the primary tributaries of Seven Beaver Lake, the source of the Saint Louis River. Most of the North River lies in Lake County, with its outlet located in St. Louis County. The United States Geological Survey considers North River to be the source stream (most distant headwaters) of the entire drainage basin of the Great Lakes and St. Lawrence system.

== See also ==
- Minnesota rivers
