= Conseil de la Nation Atikamekw =

Tribal council in Quebec, Canada

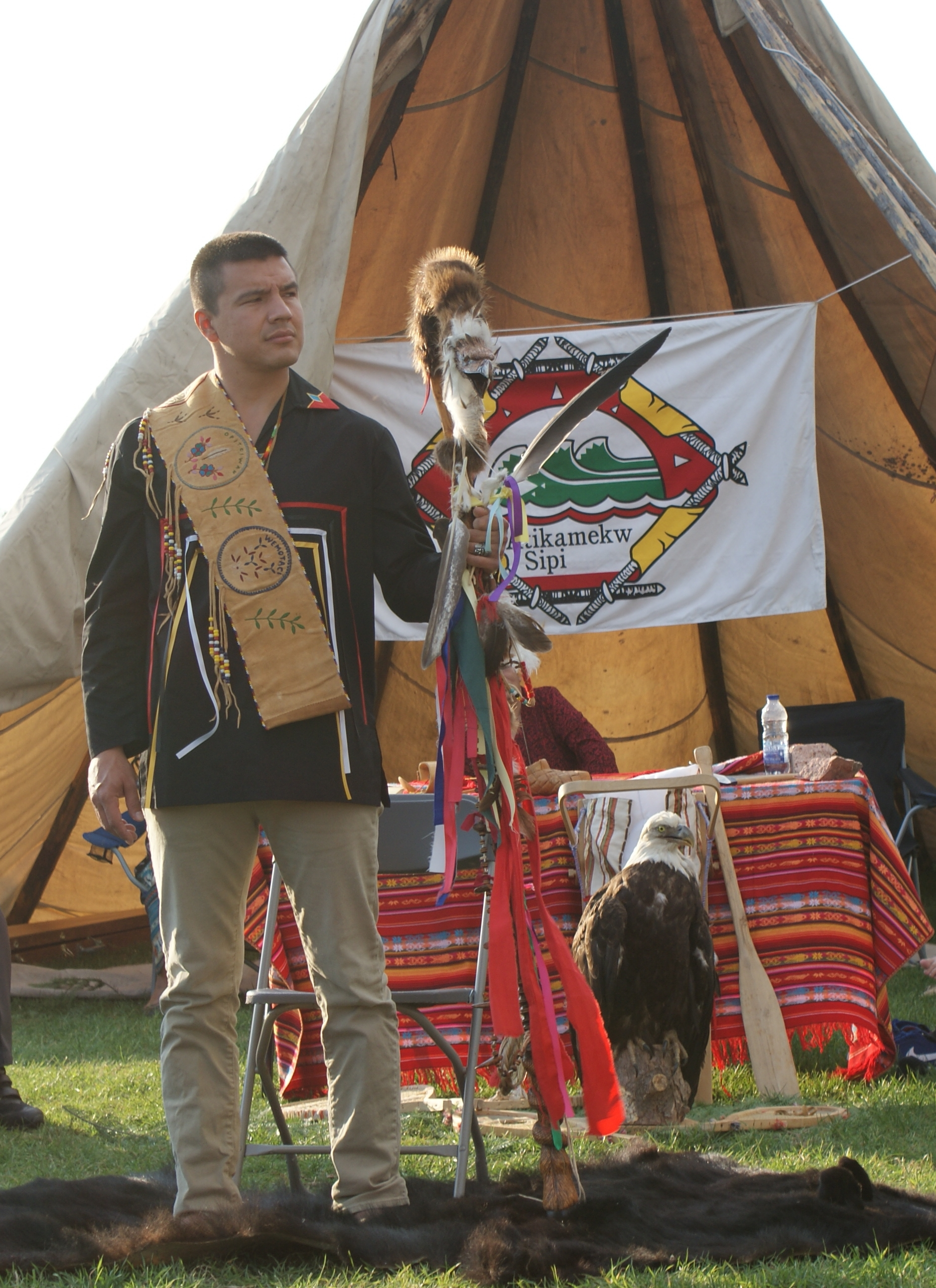
Constant Awashish during his swearing as the grand chief of the Conseil de la Nation Atikamekw, in the background the flag of the CNA

The Conseil de la Nation Atikamekw (CNA) (French for "Council of the Atikamekw Nation"), officially named Atikamekw Sipi - Conseil de la Nation Atikamekw, is a tribal council in Quebec, Canada. It is composed of the three Atikamekw bands: Manawan, Opitciwan and Wemotaci. Together, the three bands have a total registered population of 7,747 members in 2016. It is headquartered in La Tuque, Quebec. The role of the CNA is to officially represent all Atikamekw Nehirowisiw. In September 2014, the CNA declared its sovereignty on its ancestral territory, the Nitaskinan, covering approximately 80,000 km^{2}.
