= Death of Joyce Echaquan =

2020 death of an Atikamekw woman in Quebec

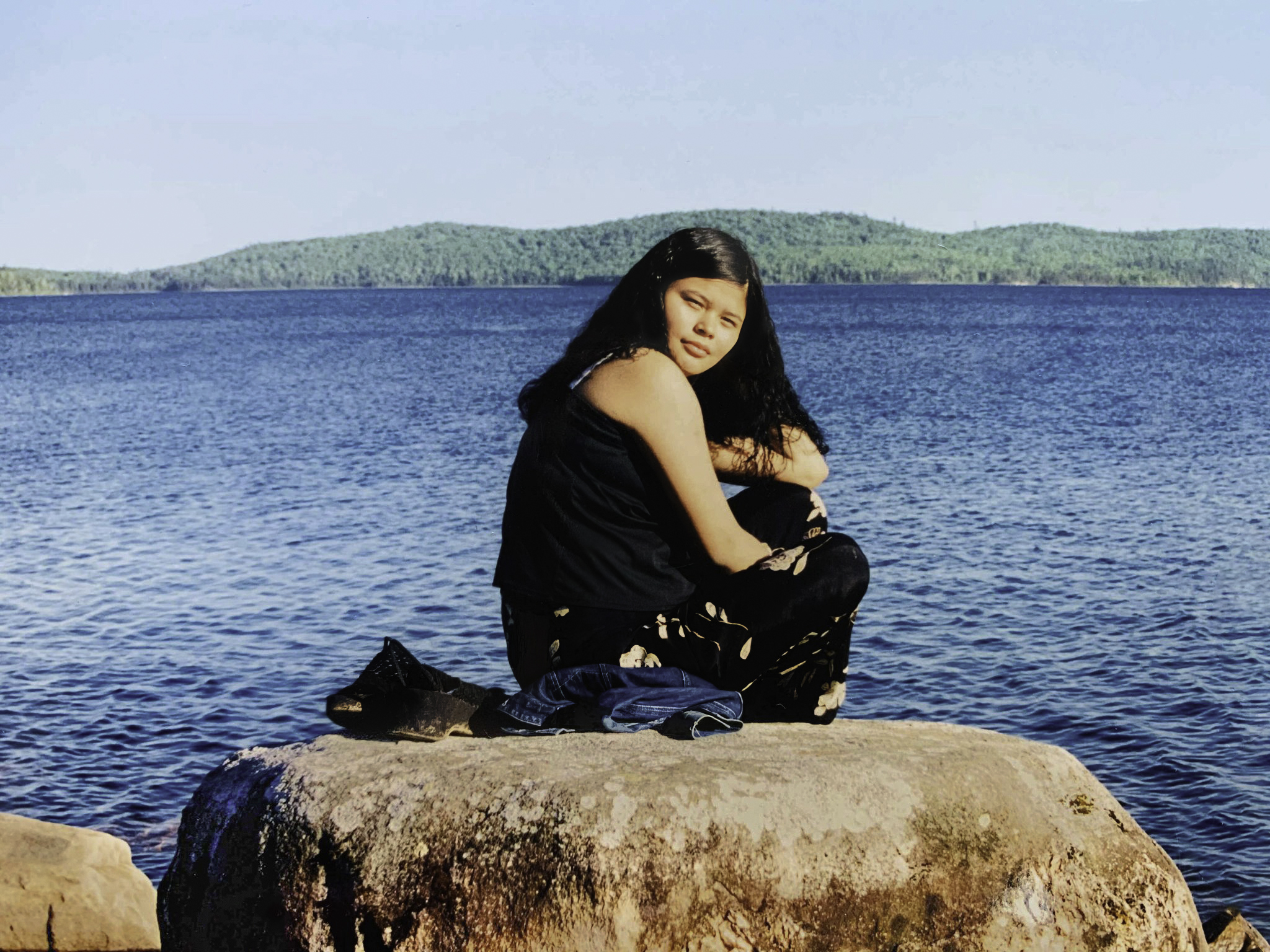
- Joyce Echaquan beside a lake, 1999.
- Date: September 28, 2020
- Location: Centre hospitalier de Lanaudière, Saint-Charles-Borromée, Quebec, Canada

Joyce Echaquan was a 37-year-old Atikamekw woman who died on September 28, 2020, in the Centre Hospitalier de Lanaudière in Saint-Charles-Borromée, Quebec. Before her death, she recorded a Facebook Live video that showed her screaming in pain while healthcare workers abused her and made derogatory comments about her, assuming her to be a drug addict experiencing withdrawal symptoms, in what has been widely described as a racist incident.

Coroner Géhane Kamel stated that Echaquan's death was further proof of the systemic Indigenous-directed racism in Quebecois institutions. A petition was launched to promote recognition of racism and systemic discrimination towards Indigenous peoples in public institutions in Quebec following Echaquan's death.

Prime Minister Justin Trudeau recognized the role of systemic racism in Echaquan's death in a speech before the House of Commons.

== Background ==
Echaquan was born on August 28, 1983, in Manawan, Quebec. A mother of seven, she had been frequently visiting the hospital since 2014. She had prior heart complications that required a pacemaker.

Due to her distrusting medical staff and not being fluent in French, Echaquan would record Facebook Live videos during her hospital visits and have a cousin translate. Another cousin said that Echaquan would often talk about medical staff seeming "fed up" with her and would only make sure she was not in pain, rather than actually treating her.

== Incident ==
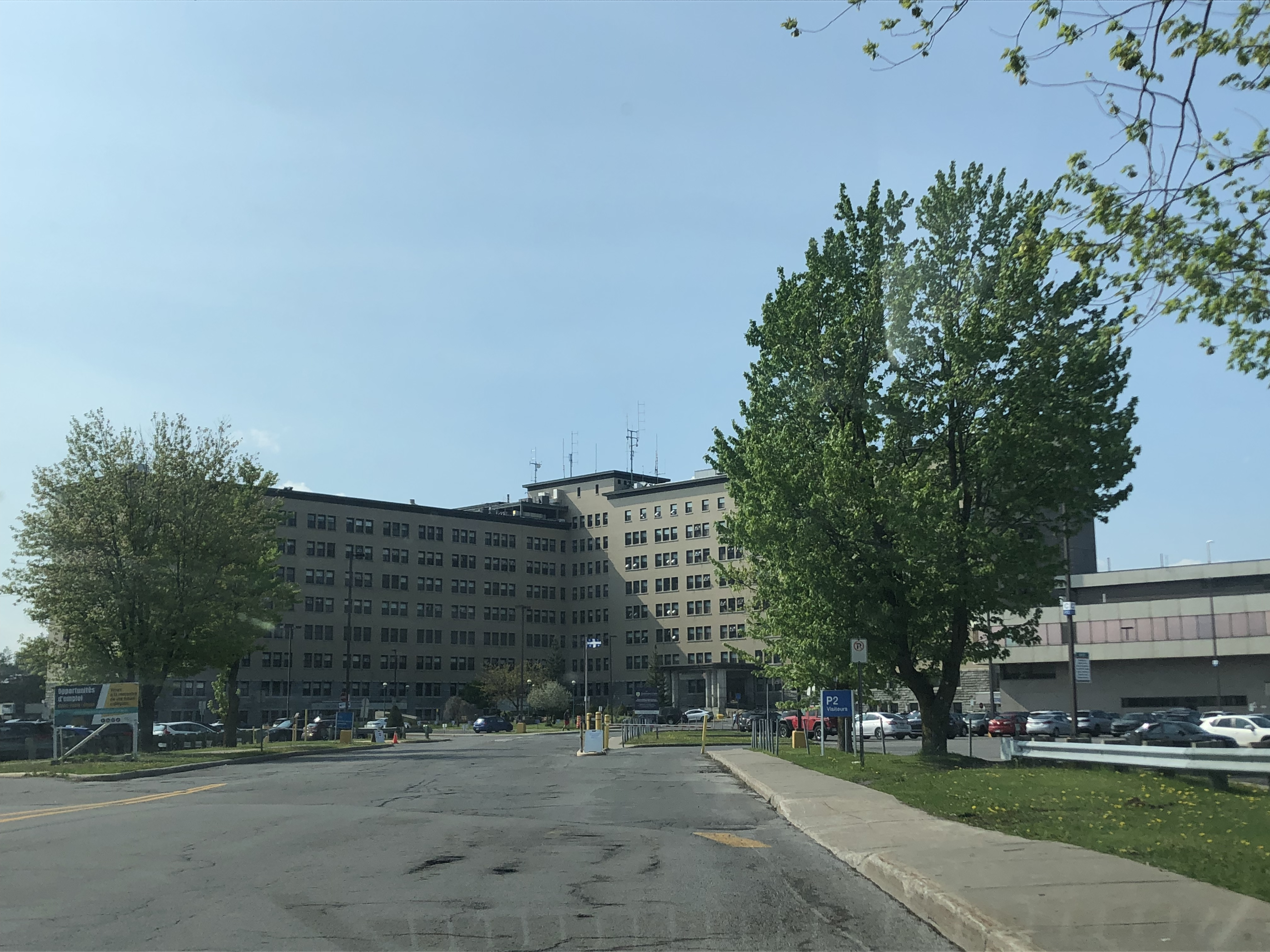
Centre Hospitalier de Lanaudière, the hospital where the incident occurred.

Echaquan was admitted to the hospital on September 26, 2020, for stomach pains. She had made the 200-kilometre journey from Manawan to Saint-Charles-Borromée by ambulance. At the Centre Hospitalier de Lanaudière, she was restrained to her bed, allegedly at her request, although the coroner expressed doubt to this allegation, calling it "absurd". She was administered morphine on September 28, despite her concerns that she would have an adverse reaction to it.

Echaquan live-streamed for seven minutes on September 28. During the livestream, at least two hospital employees are heard insulting her in French. While Echaquan was moaning in pain, an employee asked her if she was "done acting stupid." Another employee told Echaquan that she "made some bad choices" and asked what her children would be thinking if they saw her, to which she quietly responded with: "That's why I came here." Echaquan was also told that she was only "good for sex", that the employees were the ones "paying for this", and that she was "stupid as hell." When the nurse realised that the conversations between her and her colleague were being recorded, she grabbed the phone and attempted to delete the recording. Echaquan died later that day of pulmonary edema. According to her family, she was allergic to morphine.

One employee, a nurse, was dismissed from the hospital on September 29. A second employee, an orderly, was dismissed on October 1.

=== Previous incident ===
Another incident where Echaquan was mistreated by hospital staff happened in late August 2020, a month before her death.

33-year-old Jennifer MacDonald, a patient attendant at a local Alzheimer's centre who was at the hospital to support her father, overheard Echaquan screaming in a nearby cubicle and expressing concerns about her treatment. MacDonald described Echaquan's medical attendants as "indifferent and verbally aggressive", she said they were ignoring her pleas, and she also overheard a nurse ask: "Will she ever shut up?" At one point, she approached Echaquan in order to see if she could help her, but the staff told her to "mind her own business."

MacDonald did not know that the woman who was being mistreated in August was Echaquan until she saw the Facebook Live video and recognized her.

== Reactions ==
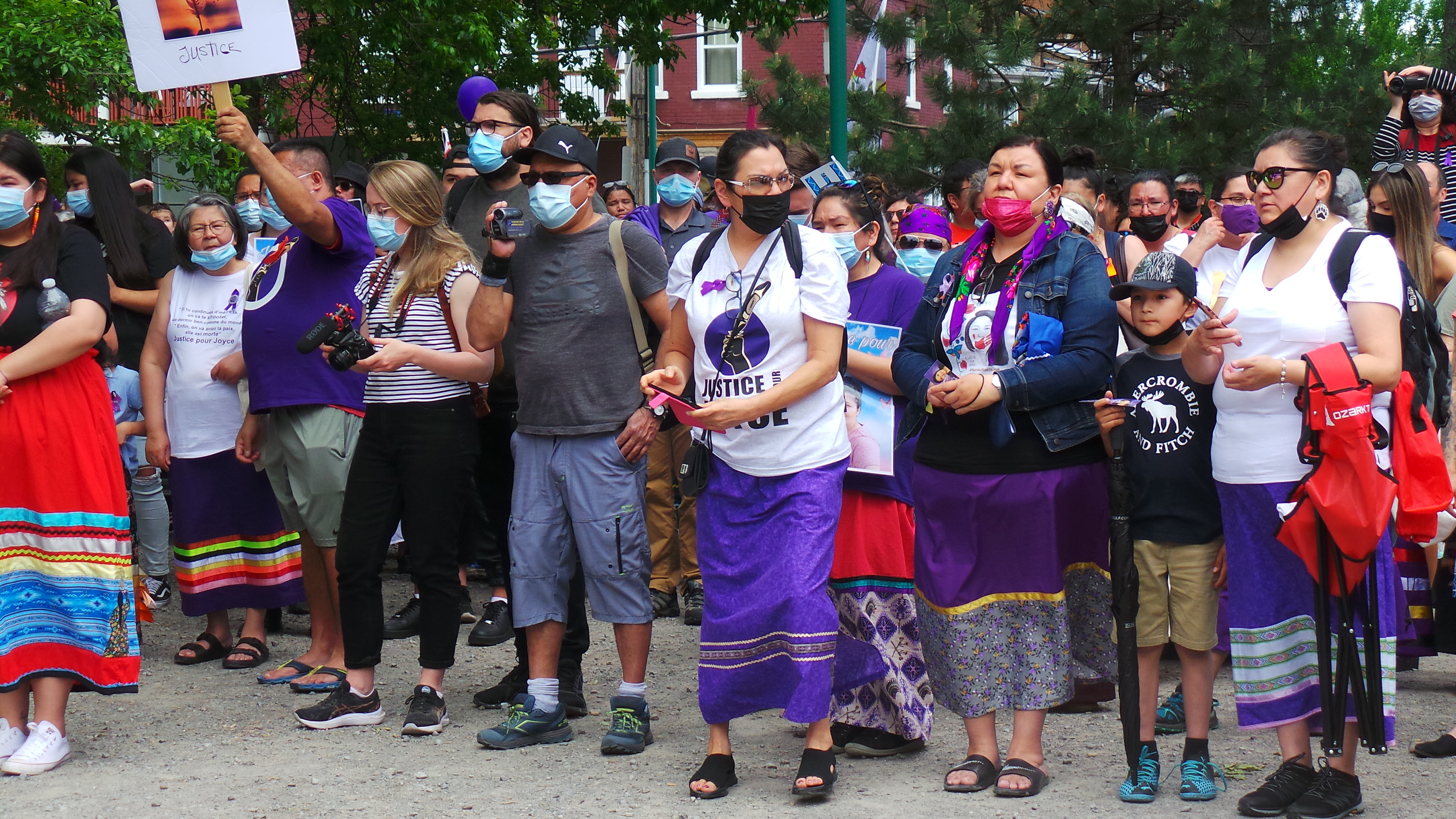
Supporters march in memory of Joyce Echaquan in Trois-Rivières, Québec.

The premier of Quebec, François Legault, condemned the medical staff's comments about Echaquan and called them racist. However, he denied the existence of systemic racism in Quebec. Canadian Prime Minister Justin Trudeau called the incident "the worst form of racism" and "systemic racism".

Marc Miller, the Canadian federal Minister of Indigenous Services, met Echaquan's son, Thomas-James, and apologized to her family for the incident.

The director of the Lanaudière health board Daniel Castonguay was removed from his position in December 2020. The new CEO of the health board since April 2021, Maryse Poupart, said she was a "person of action" and gave condolences to Echaquan's family while promising to prioritize relations with Indigenous patients.

== Investigation ==
The Quebec coroner's office confirmed on September 29 that they would be investigating the circumstances of Echaquan's death. The hearings took place in 2021. The local health authority, CISSS de Lanaudière, also launched its own investigation.

The Minister of Indigenous Services confirmed on October 8, that a meeting of Federal ministers and Indigenous leaders is planned. The meeting will include Crown-Indigenous Relations Minister Carolyn Bennett, Health Minister Patty Hajdu, Justice Minister David Lametti and Minister of Rural Economic Development Maryam Monsef.

Echaquan's family is planning to take legal action.

The three-week inquiry by the coroner, Géhane Kamel, ended in June, with over 2,000 people marching in Trois-Rivières as well as other marches and vigils across Quebec. In September 2021 after the inquiry, Géhane Kamel reported that Echaquan's death was an "undeniable" case of racism and preventable, and that "racism and prejudice Ms. Echaquan faced" was a contributor to her death. She called upon the Quebec government to recognize systemic racism existed and to "make the commitment to contribute to its elimination." The coroner's official cause of death was pulmonary edema, also stating that the medical staff had incorrectly assumed she was suffering from drug withdrawal.

== Joyce's Principle ==
Joyce's Principle is a series of proposals put forth by Paul-Emile Ottawa, Chief of the Council of Atikamekw of Manawan, and Constant Awashish, Grand Chief of the Atikamekw Nation, in November 2020. Joyce's Principle is described as follows:

"Joyce's Principle aims to guarantee to all Indigenous people the right of equitable access, without any discrimination, to all social and health services, as well as the right to enjoy the best possible physical, mental, emotional and spiritual health. Joyce's Principle requires the recognition and respect of Indigenous people's traditional and living knowledge in all aspects of health."

== See also ==
- Joyce Echaquan on the Atikamekw Wikipedia

=== Related articles ===
- Manawan
- Atikamekw
- First Nations in Canada
- Indigenous peoples in Quebec
- Truth and Reconciliation Commission of Canada
- Missing and murdered Indigenous women in Canada
- Jordan's Principle

=== External links ===
- [video] La famille de Joyce Echaquan commente le rapport d'enquête sur sa mort – 5 octobre 2021 (fr)
