= Eva Ottawa =

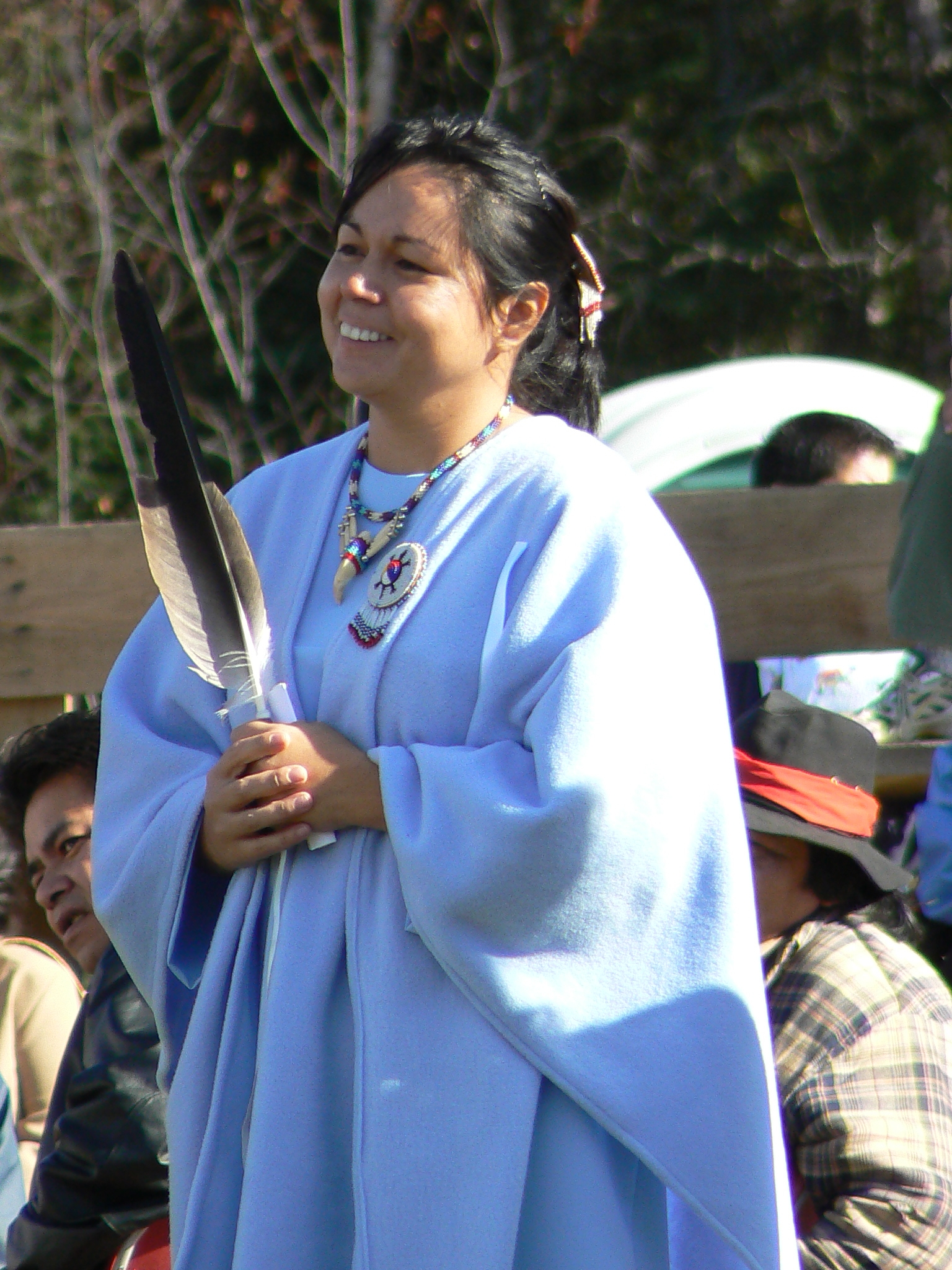
- Eva Ottawa in 2006
- Born: 1971 (age 54–55)

Eva Ottawa is an Atikamekw political figure. She was the first women to be elected Grand Chief of the Conseil de la Nation Atikamekw and the first Indigenous woman to lead the Conseil du statut de la femme du Québec. She received the Queen Elizabeth II Diamond Jubilee Medal in 2012 and the Médaille Premiers Peuples in 2019. She is currently a law professor at the University of Ottawa.

== Biography ==
Ottawa was born in Manawan, Quebec. In 1996, she received a Bachelors of Sociology from Université Laval, followed by a Bachelor of Laws in 2002.

Ottawa served as Grand Chief of the Atikamekw Nehirowiskwew Nation from 2006 until 2013. She was first elected Grand Chief in 2006, with over 75% of the vote, becoming the first woman to hold this position. She was re-elected in 2010.

Ottawa has taught the Civil Law Section at University of Ottawa since 2020 and developed a Certificate in Indigenous Law Program.
