= Atikamekw language =

Cree language of southwestern Quebec, Canada

Atikamekw
- atikamekw nehiromowin
- Native to: Canada
- Region: Quebec
- Ethnicity: Atikamekw
- Native speakers: 6,200 (2016 census)
- Language family: Algic: Algonquian; Cree-Montagnais-Naskapi; Atikamekw

Language codes
- ISO 639-3: atj
- Glottolog: atik1240
- ELP: Attikamek
- Linguasphere: 62-ADA-c
- Atikamekw is classified as Vulnerable by the UNESCO Atlas of the World's Languages in Danger.

atikamekw / nehirowisiw "lake whitefish" / "Indigenous person"
- Person: Atikamekw Nehirowisiw
- People: Atikamekw Nehirowisiwok
- Language: Atikamekw Nehiromowin
- Country: Nitaskinan (Nehirowisi Aski)

Atikamekw (endonym: Atikamekw Nehiromowin, literally "Atikamekw native language") is a variety of the Algonquian language Cree and the language of the Atikamekw people of southwestern Quebec, Canada. It is spoken by nearly all the Atikamekw, and therefore it is among the indigenous languages least threatened with extinction, according to some studies.

Atikamekw is a language belonging to the Cree–Montagnais–Naskapi linguistic continuum, which is part of the Central branch of the Algonquian languages of the Algic family of languages. It is sometimes classified as a dialect of Cree.

The Atikamekw reflex of Proto-Algonquian liquid ("L" sound) *l is [ɾ] (spelled 'r'). The corresponding sound in other Cree dialects is [n], [j], [l], or [ð] (it is consistently one of these depending on the dialect). So, alternatively, it is also referred to as the "r-Dialect of Cree". Another way in which Atikamekw is distinctive among dialects of Cree is in having many loanwords from the Anishinaabe language.

== Phonology ==
=== Consonants ===
The consonants of Atikamekw are listed below in the standard orthography and with IPA equivalents in brackets:

Consonants
	Labial	Alveolar	Palatal	Velar	Glottal
Nasal	m [m]	n [n]			
Stop	p [p]	t [t]	tc (c) [t͡ʃ]	k [k]	
Fricative		s [s]	c (s̀) [ʃ]		h [h]
Tap		r [ɾ]			
Approximant	w [w]		i (y) [j]		

In Atikamekw, fortis and lenis consonants are not distinguished in writing, even though they are in speech. But if precise spelling is required, fortis consonant realised as a geminate is indicated with an underline on the letter of concern.

=== Vowels ===
The vowels of Atikamekw are listed below:

Vowels
	Front		Back	
	long	short	long	short
Close	î [iː]	i [i]		
Mid	e [eː]		ô [oː]	o [o]
Open			â [aː]	a [a]

- Vowel length (shown above with a circumflex accent) is typically not indicated in the written language.

== See also ==
- Atikamekw Wikipedia

== Notes ==
Indigenous languages of the Americas with Wikipedia
Item	Label/en	native label	Code	distribution map	number of speakers, writers, or signers	UNESCO language status	Ethnologue language status	?itemwiki
Q36806	Southern Quechua	qu:Urin Qichwa qu:Qhichwa qu:Qichwa	qu		6000000	2 vulnerable		Quechua Wikipedia
Q35876	Guarani	gn:Avañe'ẽ	gn		4850000	1 safe	1 National	Guarani Wikipedia
Q4627	Aymara	ay:Aymar aru	ay		4000000	2 vulnerable		Aymara Wikipedia
Q13300	Nahuatl	nah:Nawatlahtolli nah:nawatl nah:mexkatl	nah		1925620	2 vulnerable		Nahuatl Wikipedia
Q891085	Wayuu	guc:Wayuunaiki	guc		300000	2 vulnerable	5 Developing	Wayuu Wikipedia
Q33730	Mapudungun	arn:Mapudungun	arn		300000	3 definitely endangered	6b Threatened	Mapuche Wikipedia
Q13310	Navajo	nv:Diné bizaad nv:Diné	nv		169369	2 vulnerable	6b Threatened	Navajo Wikipedia
Q25355	Greenlandic	kl:Kalaallisut	kl		56200	2 vulnerable	1 National	Greenlandic Wikipedia
Q29921	Inuktitut	ike-cans:ᐃᓄᒃᑎᑐᑦ iu:Inuktitut	iu		39770	2 vulnerable		Inuktitut Wikipedia
Q33388	Cherokee	chr:ᏣᎳᎩ ᎧᏬᏂᎯᏍᏗ chr:ᏣᎳᎩ	chr		12300	4 severely endangered	8a Moribund	Cherokee Wikipedia
Q33390	Cree	cr:ᐃᔨᔨᐤ ᐊᔨᒧᐎᓐ' cr:nēhiyawēwin	cr		10875; 8040			Cree Wikipedia
Q32979	Choctaw	cho:Chahta anumpa cho:Chahta	cho		9200	2 vulnerable	6b Threatened	Choctaw Wikipedia
Q56590	Atikamekw	atj:Atikamekw Nehiromowin atj:Atikamekw	atj		6160	2 vulnerable	5 Developing	Atikamekw Wikipedia
Q27183	Iñupiaq	ik:Iñupiatun	ik		5580	4 severely endangered		Inupiat Wikipedia
Q523014	Muscogee	mus:Mvskoke	mus		4300	3 definitely endangered	7 Shifting	Muscogee Wikipedia
Q33265	Cheyenne	chy:Tsêhesenêstsestôtse	chy		2400	3 definitely endangered	8a Moribund	Cheyenne Wikipedia
