= Cesar Newashish =

Atikamekw canoe builder (1904–1994)

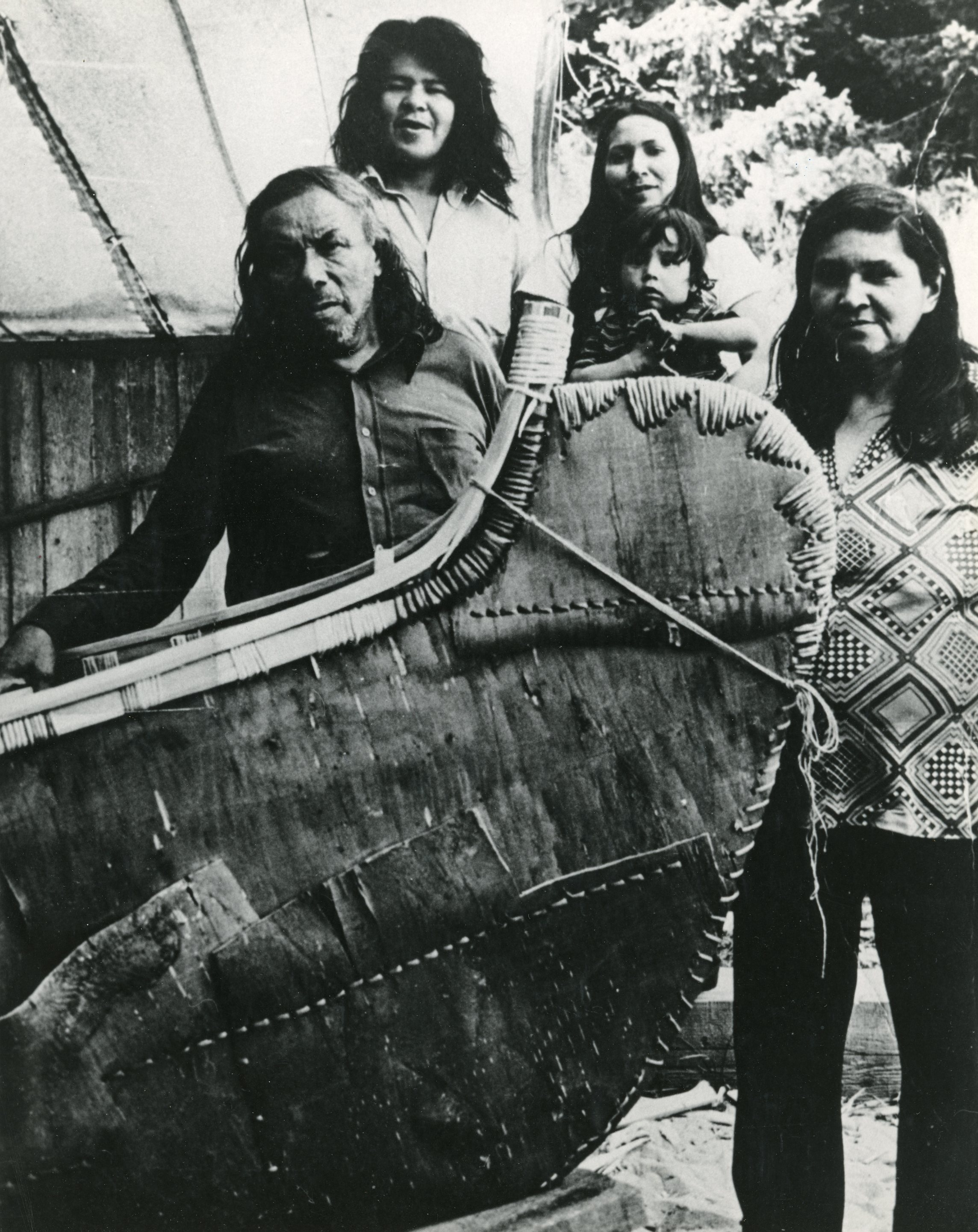
Cesar Newashish in 1979, during the shooting of the series "Les six saisons atikamekw" (The six Atikamekw seasons)

Cesar Newashish (1904–1994) was an Atikamekw (First Nations) canoe maker and elder. He was born in 1904 in Manawan, Quebec, a settlement located about 200 kilometres north of Montreal, Quebec.

In 1971, he attended the Mariposa Folk Festival as an artisan, and built a canoe there, using the traditional methods of his ancestors: birch bark, cedar splints, spruce roots and gum. Once the festival was over, he then donated the birch bark canoe to the Royal Ontario Museum, where it was still on display as of 2018. His work on building the canoe is documented in the National Film Board of Canada documentary called Cesar's Bark Canoe, which was also released in 1971.

Cesar Newashish died at the age of 90.
