= Atikamekw Wikipedia =

Atikamekw-language edition of Wikipedia

- Website type: Internet encyclopedia
- Owner: Wikimedia Foundation
- Website: atj.wikipedia.org
- Commercial: No
- Registration: Optional
- Launched: 2017; 9 years ago
- Content license: Creative Commons Attribution/ Share-Alike 4.0 (most text also dual-licensed under GFDL); Media licensing varies

The Atikamekw Wikipedia (Atikamekw: Wikipetcia Atikamekw Nehiromowin) is the Atikamekw-language edition of Wikipedia, the free online encyclopedia. As of 22 September 2026, this edition of Wikipedia has 2,082 articles.

== History ==
The Atikamekw language is spoken by Indigenous communities in Quebec. The language is underrepresented online, forcing many Atikamekw speakers to browse the internet in French, their second language. In an effort led by the linguist Nastasia Herold, in partnership with the Atikamekw Nehirowisiw Nation and supported by the Wikimedia Foundation, the Atikamekw Wikipedia was established to provide the language and culture an online presence.

While there is also an Inuktitut edition of Wikipedia, the Atikamekw Wikipedia is the only actively used edition of Wikipedia for an Indigenous language in Canada. The Atikamekw Wikipedia was developed in the Wikimedia Incubator for several years before being released to the public in 2017.
