= Innu language =

Cree language of eastern Canada

Montagnais
- Innu-aimun
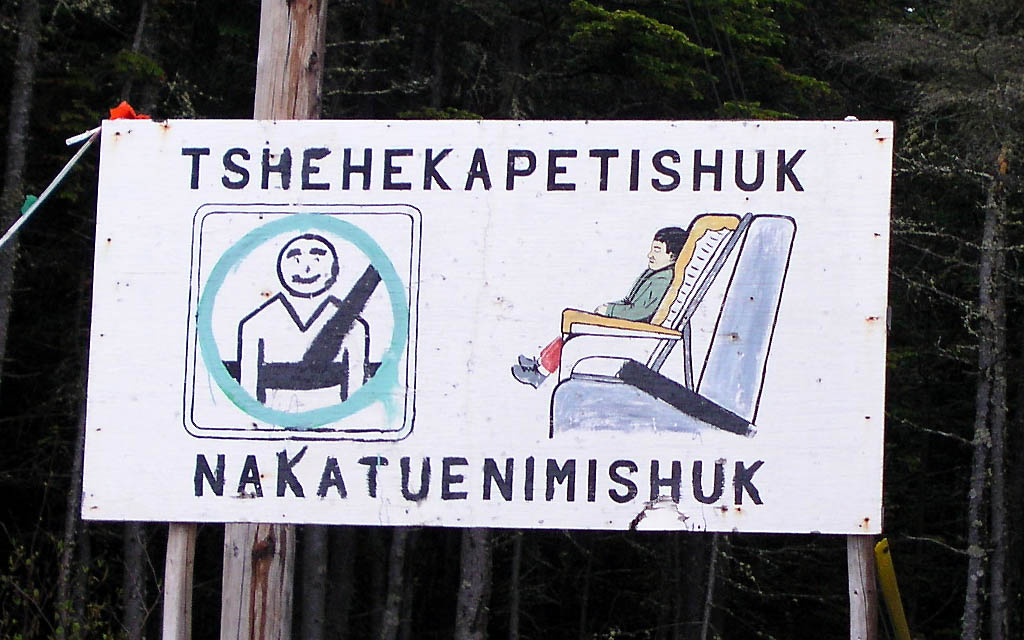
- "Buckle up your children" sign in Innu-aimun, in the Nutashkuan reserve near Natashquan, Quebec
- Native to: Canada
- Region: Nitassinan (Quebec, Labrador)
- Ethnicity: Innu
- Native speakers: 10,075, 36% of ethnic population (2016 census)
- Language family: Algic: Algonquian; Cree-Montagnais-Naskapi; Montagnais

Language codes
- ISO 639-3: moe
- Glottolog: mont1268
- Linguasphere: 62-ADA-bb
- Eastern Montagnais is classified as Vulnerable by the UNESCO Atlas of the World's Languages in Danger.

Innu, Ilnu / assi "person" / "land"
- Person: Innu / Ilnu
- People: Innut / Innuat / Ilnuatsh
- Language: Innu-aimun
- Country: Nitassinan

Innu-aimun or Montagnais is an Algonquian language spoken by over 10,000 Innu in Labrador and Quebec in Eastern Canada. It is a member of the Cree–Montagnais–Naskapi dialect continuum and is spoken in various dialects, depending on the community.

== Literature ==
Since the 1980s, Innu-aimun has had considerable exposure in the popular culture of Canada and France due to the success of the rock music band Kashtin and the later solo careers of its founders Claude McKenzie and Florent Vollant. Widely heard hit songs with Innu-language lyrics have included "Ish-kuess" ("Girl"), "E Uassiuian" ("My Childhood"), "Tipatshimun" ("Story") and in particular "Akua tuta" ("Take care of yourself"), which appeared on soundtrack compilations for the television series Due South and the documentary Music for The Native Americans. The lyrics of Akua Tuta are featured on over 50 websites, making this one of the most broadly accessible pieces of text written in any native North American language. Florent Vollant has also rendered several well-known Christmas carols into Innu in his 1999 album Nipaiamianan.

In 2013, "a comprehensive pan-Innu dictionary, covering all the Innu dialects spoken in Quebec and Labrador [was] published in Innu, English and French."

== Phonology ==
Innu-aimun has the following phonemes (with the standard orthography equivalents in angle brackets); this section discusses the Sheshatshit dialect):

=== Consonants ===
	Bilabial	Alveolar	Post- alveolar	Velar		Glottal
	Bilabial	Alveolar	Post- alveolar	plain	labial	Glottal
Nasal	m ⟨m⟩	n ⟨n⟩				
Occlusive	p ⟨p⟩	t ⟨t⟩	tʃ ⟨tsh⟩	k ⟨k⟩	kʷ ⟨kᵘ/ku⟩	
Fricative		s ⟨ss⟩	ʃ ⟨sh/s⟩			h ⟨h⟩
Approximant		l ⟨l⟩				

- The stops are voiced [b d dʒ ɡ ɡʷ] intervocalically.
- /ʃ/ frequently merges with /h/ for younger speakers, e.g. shīshīp [ʃiʃip ~ ʃihip ~ hihip] 'duck'.
- /l/ exists only in the southern dialects of Mashteuiatsh and Betsiamites. Other dialects, including the standard orthography, use /n/ in those positions.

=== Vowels ===
There are three pairs of so-called "long" and "short" vowels and one long vowel with no short counterpart, but the length distinction is giving way to a place distinction. The column titles here refer chiefly to the place of articulation of the long vowel.

	High Front	Mid Front	Mid/Low Central	High Back
"Long"	i ⟨ī⟩	e ⟨e⟩	a ⟨ā⟩	o ~ u (Note: [u] particularly after i) ⟨ū⟩
"Short"	ɨ ~ ə ~ j ⟨i⟩		ə ~ ʌ (Note: [ʌ] particularly before m) ⟨a⟩	ʊ ~ w ⟨u⟩

Macron accent marks over the long vowels are omitted in general writing, and e is not written with a macron because there is no contrasting short e.

== Grammar ==
Innu-aimun is a polysynthetic, head-marking language with a relatively free word order. Its three basic parts of speech are nouns, verbs, and particles. Nouns are grouped into two genders, animate and inanimate, and may carry affixes indicating plurality, possession, obviation, and location. Verbs are divided into four classes based on their transitivity: animate intransitive (AI), inanimate intransitive (II), transitive inanimate (TI), and transitive animate (TA). Verbs may carry affixes indicating agreement (with both subject and object arguments), tense, mood, and inversion. Two different sets, or orders, of verbal affixes are used depending on the verb's syntactic context. In simple main clauses, the verb is marked using affixes of the independent order, whereas in subordinate clauses and content-word questions, affixes of the conjunct order are used.

== Dialects ==
Innu-aimun is related to East Cree (Īyiyū Ayimūn – Northern/Coastal dialect and Īnū Ayimūn – Southern/Inland dialect) spoken by the James Bay Cree of the James Bay region of Quebec and Ontario and the Atikamekw (Nēhinawēwin and Nehirâmowin) of the Atikamekw (Nehiraw, Nehirowisiw) in the upper Saint-Maurice River valley of Quebec. Innu-aimun is divided into four dialects – Southern Montagnais (Mashteuiatsh, Betsiamites), Eastern Montagnais (Ekuanitshit, Nutashkuan, Unamen Shipu, Pakuashipi), Central Montagnais (Uashat and Maliotenam, Matimekosh) and Labrador-Montagnais (Sheshatshit). The speakers of the different dialects can communicate well with one another. The Naskapi language and culture are quite different from those of the Montagnais, in which the dialect changes from y to n as in Iiyuu versus Innu.
