= Nitaskinan =

Ancestral homeland of the Atikamekw people of southwestern Quebec, Canada

Coordinates: 52°49′9.8″N 67°11′53.3″W

Nitaskinan Nehirowisi Aski Atikamekw Aski
- Time immemorial–1763 (as a State)
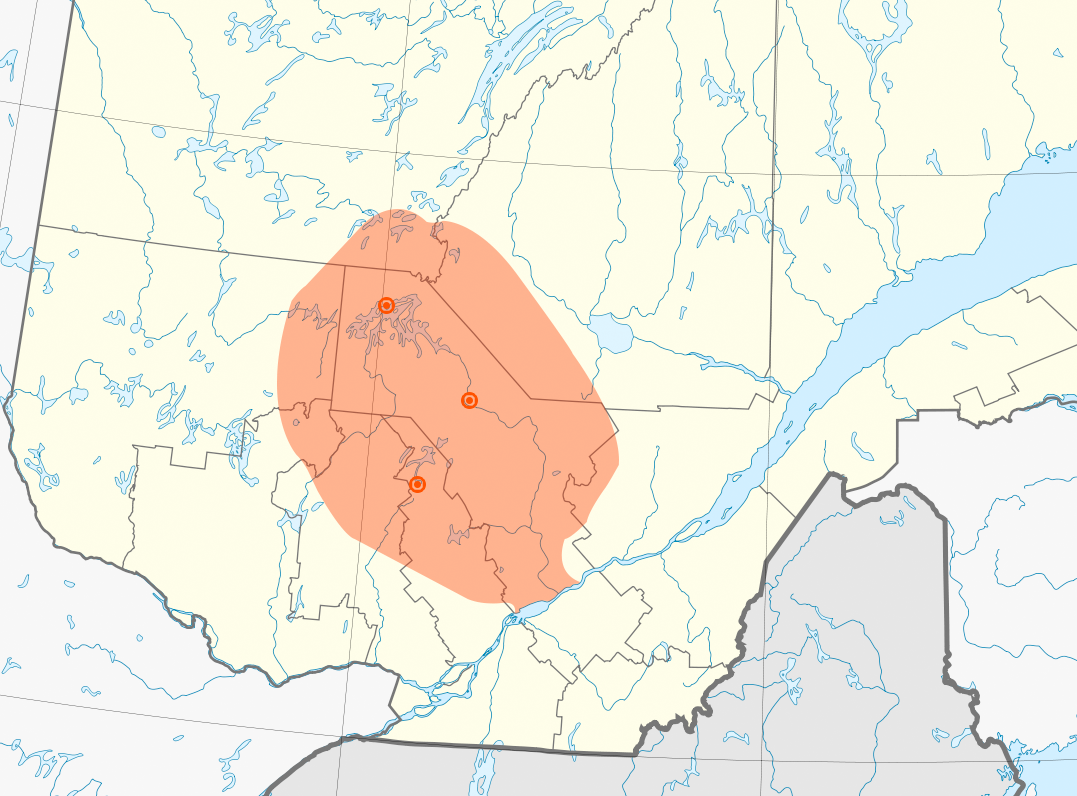
- Map of Atikamekw Aski in Quebec, Canada
- Status: Unrecognized / former country
- Common languages: French, Atikamekw Nehiromowin, LSQ, English
- Demonyms: Atikamekw (nehirowisiwok, iriniwok)
- History
  - Established: Time immemorial
  - Indian Act: 1876
  - Disestablished: 1763 (as a State)

Area
- Pre-invasion: 80,000 km^{2} (31,000 sq mi)
- 20th c.: 51.35 km^{2} (19.83 sq mi)

Population
  - 2016: 7,747
- Today part of: Quebec, Canada

atikamekw / nehirowisiw "lake whitefish" / "Indigenous person"
- Person: Atikamekw Nehirowisiw
- People: Atikamekw Nehirowisiwok
- Language: Atikamekw Nehiromowin
- Country: Nitaskinan (Nehirowisi Aski)

Nitaskinan, also known as Nehirowisi Aski and Atikamekw Territory, is the ancestral country of the Atikamekw people. It is located in the valley of the Saint-Maurice River in Quebec, Canada. It covers an area of 80,000 km^{2} (31,000 sq mi). On 8 September 2014, the Conseil de la Nation Atikamekw declared unilaterally the sovereignty of the Atikamekw Nation on the Nistaskinan. The objective of this is mainly to obtain a right of review for the projects exploiting the natural resources and to highlight the Atikamekw's identity. "Nitaskinan" means "our (excl.) land" in the Atikamekw language, where "Kitaskinan" means "our (inclusive) land," similar to other Cree languages' use of aski. From a legal perspective, according to the Canadian Indian Act, the Atikamekw have self-administration on three Indian reserves, Manawan, Obedjiwan and Wemotaci, but territory of Nitaskinan covers an area much wider.

== Etymology ==
Nitaskinan and Nehirowisi Aski mean "our land" and "Atikamekw Country," respectively, in Nehiromowin. Both centre the root aski ("land"), originating from Proto-Algonquian *axskiy, relating it to Ojibwemowin's aki and the Istchee in Eeyou Istchee, (Note: (/iːjoʊ̯ ɪst͡ʃi/, Northern East Cree: ᐄᔨᔨᐤ ᐊᔅᒌ Iiyiyiu Aschii /ijɪjɪu əstʃi/, Southern East Cree: ᐄᔨᔫ ᐊᔅᒌ Iiyiyuu Aschii /ijɪju əstʃi/ or ᐄᓅ ᐊᔅᒌ Iinuu Aschii /inu əstʃi/, all meaning 'The People's Land'; French: [iju istʃi])) each meaning "land" as well.

The name "Atikamekw" is derived from atikamekw, which means "lake whitefish" in Nehiromowin. In the language, the words nehirowisiwok and iriniwok are also used, both meaning "[Atikamekw] people". The latter has its roots in Proto-Algonquian *elenyiwa ("human"); the former derives from rowi ("action, movement"), with the prefix nehi- ("balance") and the suffix -siw ("human being"). Both have cognates in the likes of: nêhinawak ᓀᐦᐃᓇᐘᐠ and ininiwak ᐃᓂᓂᐘᐠ (Swampy Cree), nīhithawak ᓃᐦᐃᖬᐘᐠ and ithiniwak ᐃᖨᓂᐘᐠ (Woods Cree), and nêhiyawak ᓀᐦᐃᔭᐘᐠ and iyiniwak ᐃᔨᓂᐘᐠ (Plains Cree).

Nitaskinan means "our (excl.) land". It is formed by attaching the prefix ni- ("I; we") and the suffix -(i)nan ("us, but not yours") to the root aski, forming the possessive. This construction is seen in neighbouring Algonquian languages like Plains Cree, Anishinaabemowin, and Innu Aimun. Indeed, Innu and Abenaki use similar constructions to refer to their homelands: Nitassinan and Ndakinna, respectively.

== See also ==
- Conseil de la Nation Atikamekw
