= Atikamekw =

Indigenous people of Quebec, Canada

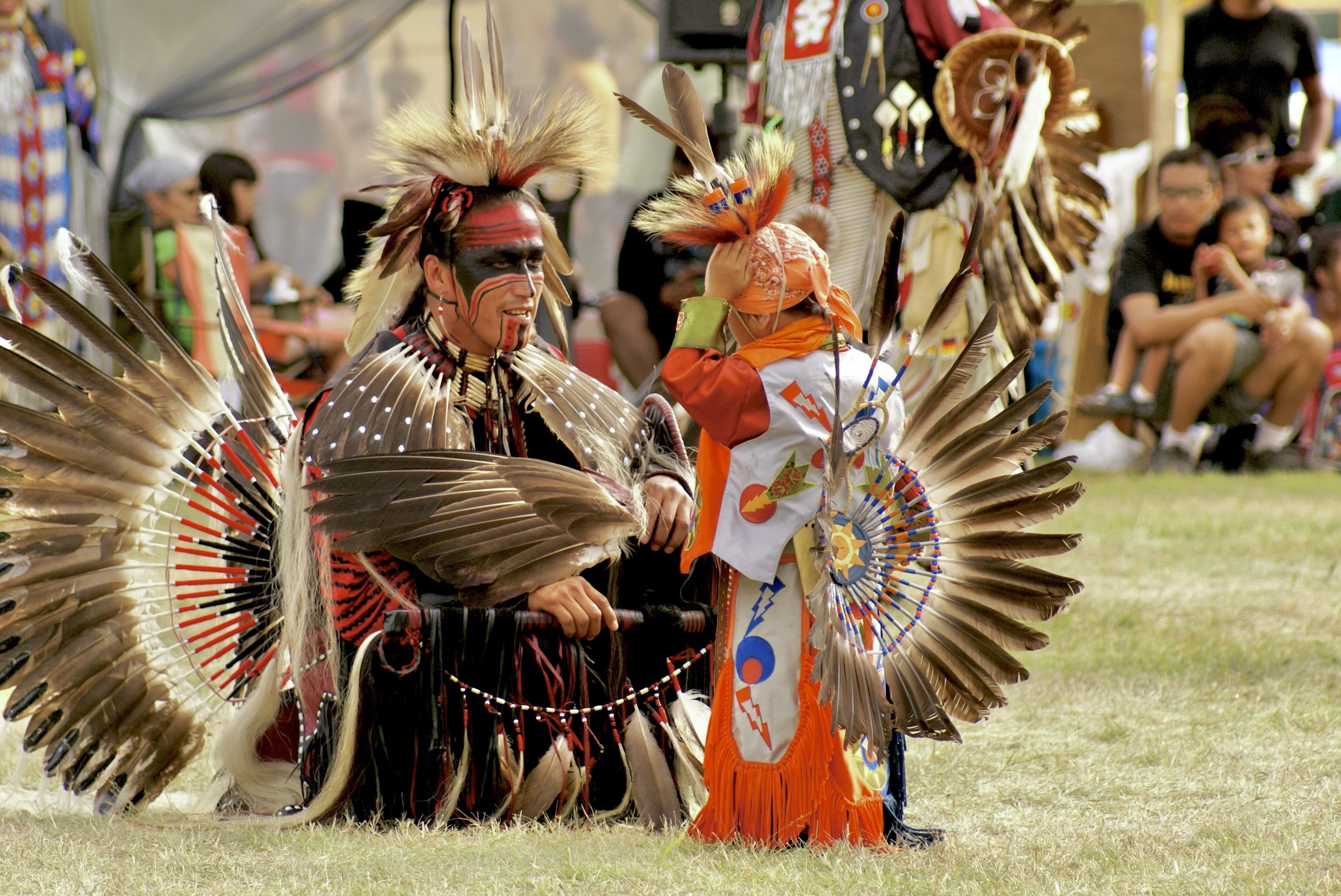

Total population
- 8,547

Regions with significant populations
- Canada (Quebec)

Languages
- Atikamekw, French

Religion
- Roman Catholicism, traditional beliefs

Related ethnic groups
- Cree, Innu, Algonquin, Naskapi and other Algonquian peoples

The Atikamekw are an Indigenous people of Quebec, Canada. They are one of the eleven Indigenous nations recognized by the Government of Quebec. Their ancestral territory, known as Nitaskinan, meaning "our land" in the Atikamekw language, is located primarily in the Mauricie and Lanaudière regions and encompasses approximately 80,000 km^{2} (31,000 sq mi) according to the Atikamekw territorial claim.

The Atikamekw population was 8,547 as of 31 December 2025. The nation consists of three First Nations communities: Manawan, Opitciwan and Wemotaci. Most Atikamekw speak the Atikamekw language, an Algonquian language closely related to Innu-aimun and other languages of the region.

Traditionally, the Atikamekw have relied on hunting, fishing, trapping, gathering and the use of forest resources. Their social and territorial organization has historically been based in part on family hunting territories within Nitaskinan. The Atikamekw continue to maintain strong cultural, linguistic and political ties to their ancestral territory.

Since 1978, the Atikamekw have pursued negotiations with the governments of Canada and Quebec concerning their comprehensive territorial claims and the recognition of their rights in Nitaskinan. In 2014, the Atikamekw Nation Council declared Atikamekw sovereignty over Nitaskinan. In 2026, Quebec and the Atikamekw Nation also began implementing a pilot project for participatory forest management intended to increase Atikamekw participation in forest planning and management on Nitaskinan.

== Population ==
Atikamekw population of Quebec as of September 2012
Communities	First Nation official name	Total registered population	Residents	Non-residents
Manawan	Les Atikamekw de Manawan	2,576	2,197	379
Obedjiwan	Atikamekw d'Opitciwan	2,683	2,225	458
Wemotaci	Conseil des Atikamekw de Wemotaci	1,730	1,358	372
Atikamekw (Total)	Attikamekw Sipi - Conseil de la Nation Atikamekw	6,989	5,780	1,209

== History ==
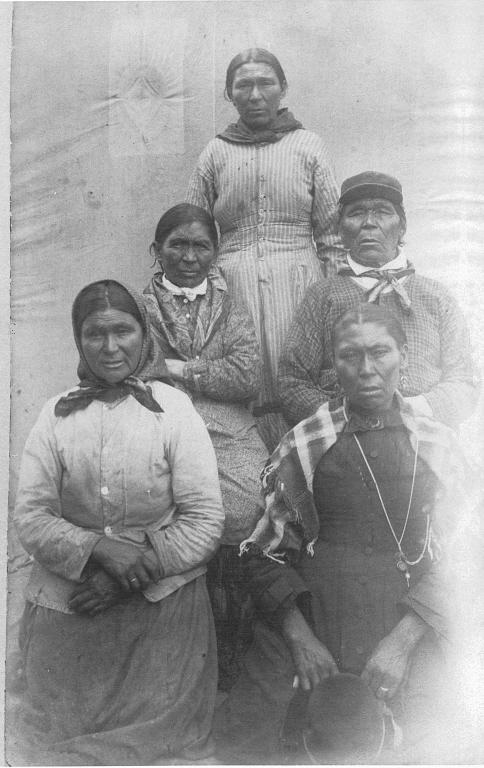
Members of the Atikamekw Nation from the Manawan community, circa 1900.

Early French historical documents begin to mention the Atikamekw at beginning of the 17th century, when they lived in the boreal forest of the upper Mauricie. In these early documents, the French colonists recorded the Atikamekw as "Atikamegouékhi", an effort to transliterate their name for themselves. The Atikamekw were described as a group of 500 to 600 people, who made up "one of the nations more considerable of the north".

For food, they fished, hunted, and trapped. They supplemented their diet with agricultural products made and processed by women, such as corn and maple syrup. The latter was boiled to reduce as a syrup after sap was tapped from maple trees. Both men and women made tools from wood and animal parts, such as bone and tendon. The women made clothing from tanned animal hides. Tribal members traded with other native peoples in nearby areas, but trading networks connected along long distances. In summer, the Atikamekw would gather at places like Wemotaci. In the fall, they would pack for the winter season and disperse into smaller encampments through the boreal forest.

After the French entered the trading network, they introduced new, European manufactured goods, such as metal tools. The Atikamekw traded furs for such goods, becoming increasingly dependent on European goods in the fur trade. They were described as a peaceful people, sharing the region with the Innu (Montagnais) in the east, the Cree in the north, and Algonquin to the south. The Mohawk of the Iroquois Confederacy, whose five nations were based south of the Great Lakes, competed with them for the lucrative beaver trade and over hunting grounds. Through their Innu allies, the Atikamekw caught new infectious diseases that were endemic among the Europeans. Around 1670-1680, a smallpox epidemic devastated the Atikamekw tribe.

The French pulled the Atikamekw into a trade war between the Montagnais (Innu) and the Mohawk, in which the Atikamekw and Innu did not fare well. Many of the Atikamekw who had survived the smallpox were killed by the more powerful Mohawk.

However, at the start of the 18th century, a group called "Tête-de-Boule" by the French reappeared in the region. While there exists no certainty as to the origin of this group, they may have been a regrouping of the few Atikamekw survivors and who were possibly associated with other indigenous nomadic tribes. But they are considered to be unrelated to the former Atikamekw even though they lived in the same area and took on the same name.

== Culture ==
The Atikamekw have their own traditional culture, language and rituals, though they had strong influences from the neighboring peoples. From this grouping, three prominent communities developed. Each spoke the same language but with unique dialects. Members of the tribe as a whole generally speak the Atikamekw language, but the majority do not write it.

Traditionally, the Atikamekw lived in dome-shaped homes, which they created with branches and covered with bark called "piskokan". They covered the floor with spruce boughs, and used furs for beds and blankets. The Atikamekw preserved meat by smoking and drying it, a process still practiced by some families. Women collected berries and processed them into a paste that could be preserved for several weeks.

=== Ethnobotany ===
They chew the sap of Abies balsamea as a cold remedy, and use the boughs as mats for the tent floor.

=== Crafts ===
The making of hunting equipment (bows, snowshoes, sled dog) as well as clothing and blankets, was in former times a task necessary for survival. The Atikamekw developed a distinctive way to decorate their clothing. They covered ceremonial robes with bells made of bones emptied of the marrow.

The Atikamekw have been recognized for their skill in crafting birch bark items such as baskets and canoes, decorating the pieces with beautiful designs. These skills have been transmitted from generation to generation. The Atikamekw are known as the "people of the bark" for their craft. The people of Obedjiwan make birch bark handicrafts less frequently than do other communities, since their environment in the boreal forest is dominated by conifer trees.

=== The seasons and the division of the year ===
The Atikamekw recognize six seasons in the year, each of which has a principal activity. The seasons begin with Sîkon, in late winter. The Atikamekw use this time to make bark baskets, which they can use to hold the maple-sap gathered in this time of year. After Sîkon is Mirôskamin, what European-Canadians would call Spring. In this season, the Atikamekw generally fished and hunted for partridge. These activities continue through Nîpin (Summer).

During Takwâkin (autumn), the Atikamekw would go hunting for moose. A successful hunt required the careful removal of the skin of the moose, making offerings, and processing the meat for preservation through smoking and drying, for moose "jerky". Women worked to make the hides usable: remove the hairs from the moose hide; soak, deflesh and tan the hide; and cut it into thin, flexible strips to weave netting for snowshoes. During the onset of winter, or Pîtcipipôn, the men would trap for beaver. During the winter, or Pipôn, the men would make nets to fish under the ice, while others produce snowshoes.

In conjunction with the seasons, the Atikamekw divide the year into 12 months. The month names are based on the primary activity or observation of nature in that period. The months are:

- Kenôsitc Pisimw – January: Longest [Winter] Moon
- Akokatcic Pisimw – February: Groundhog Emerges Moon
- Nikikw Pisimw – March: Otter Moon
- Kâ Wâsikatotc Pisimw – April: Reflects on the Ice Moon
- Wâpikon Pisimw – May: Flower Moon
- Otehimin Pisimw – June: Strawberry Moon
- Mikomin Pisimw – July: Raspberry Moon
- Otâtokon Pisimw – August: [Bird] Fledges Moon
- Kâkône Pisimw – September: Porcupine Mates Moon
- Namekosi Pisimw – October: Trout [Spawns] Moon
- Atikamekw Pisimw – November: Whitefish [Spawns] Moon
- Pîtcipipôn Pisimw – December: Winter Arrives Moon

=== Film ===
Filmmaker Chloé Leriche has made two films about the Atikamekw peoples, Before the Streets (Avant les rues) in 2016 and Atikamekw Suns (Soleils Atikamekw) in 2023.

== Territory ==
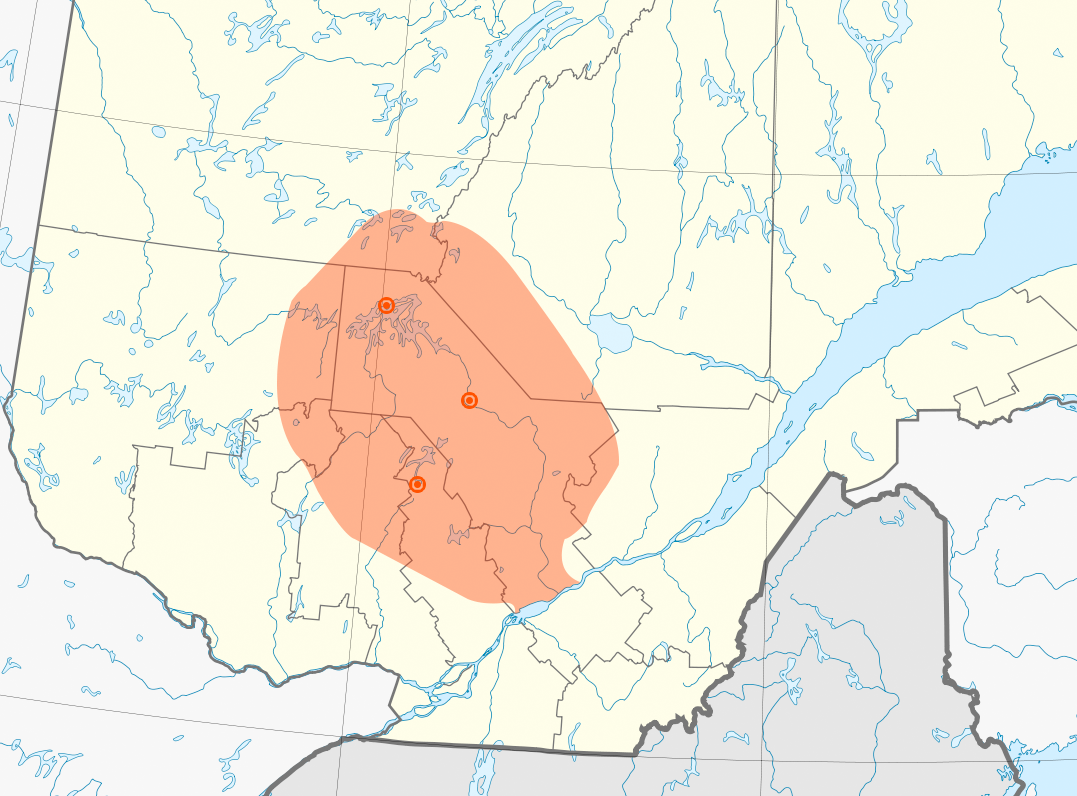
Map of Nitaskinan

The ancestral territory of the Atikamekw is called “Nitaskinan”, an Atikamekw term meaning “our land”. It extends mainly along the Saint-Maurice River valley, in Mauricie and northern Lanaudière, and covers approximately 80,000 km^{2} (31,000 sq mi) according to the Atikamekw territorial claim. It includes, among other areas, the territories surrounding La Tuque, Shawinigan and Trois-Rivières.

Historically, Nitaskinan was organized into family hunting and subsistence territories. These territories, including those known as natoho aski and atoske aski, were associated with families that exercised responsibilities and carried out traditional activities there. The family territory system remains important to contemporary Atikamekw territoriality.

Since 1978, the Atikamekw have negotiated with the governments of Canada and Quebec in an effort to settle their comprehensive land claims. On 8 September 2014, the Conseil de la Nation Atikamekw unilaterally declared Atikamekw sovereignty over Nitaskinan and called for its consent to be obtained for development, use and resource-extraction projects in the territory. The declaration did not, by itself, alter the legal status of the territory.

In 2026, the Government of Quebec and the Atikamekw Nation began developing a pilot project for participatory forest management in Nitaskinan. The initiative includes defining an area of application, identifying areas of Atikamekw interest, and developing adapted forest-management arrangements as part of a new relationship between Quebec and the Atikamekw Nation. The project forms part of the implementation of the Framework Agreement for the Negotiation of a New Nation-to-Nation Relationship concerning the Territory and Natural Resources in Nitaskinan.

== Notable people ==
- Constant Awashish, Grand Chief of the Atikamekw Nation
- Eruoma Awashish, artist
- Lise-Yolande Awashish, actress
- Kwena Bellemare-Boivin, actress and musician
- Rykko Bellemare, actor and musician
- Cesar Newashish, canoe maker
- Jacques Newashish, actor, artist and filmmaker
- Laura Niquay, singer-songwriter
- Eva Ottawa, former Grand Chief of the Atikamekw Nation
- Oshim Ottawa, actor and musician
- André Quitich, former Grand Chief of the Atikamekw Nation
