= Atikamekw of Opitciwan =

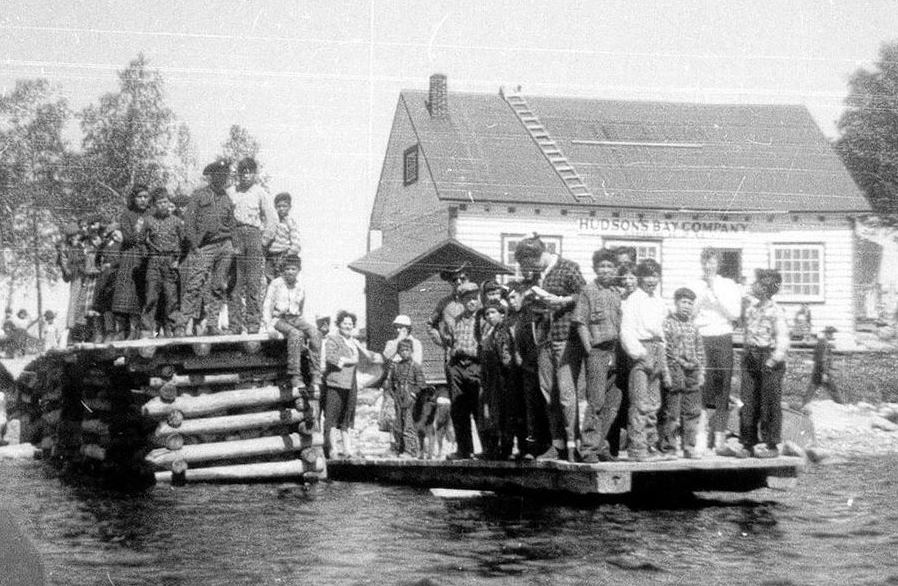
Atikamekw on the dock of the Hudson's Bay Company on the Obedjiwan Lake circa 1921

The Atikamekw of Opitciwan (French: Atikamekw d'Opitciwan) are an Atikamekw First Nation in Quebec, Canada. In 2016, it has a registered population of 2,937 members, who live primarily on an Indian reserve, Obedjiwan 28, located in Mauricie.

== Notable members ==
- Eruoma Awashish, visual artist
