= List of Indian reserves in Quebec =

The following is a list of Native reserves in Quebec, Canada. It includes only the reserves that are officially designated as Indian reserve and fall under the jurisdiction of the Canadian government's Department of Indian and Northern Affairs. Therefore, other Aboriginal local municipal units of Quebec are not listed here and can be found in the See also section.

Name as used by Indigenous and Northern Affairs Canada	First Nation(s)	Ethnic/national group	Tribal council	Treaty	Area		Population			Notes & references
Name as used by Indigenous and Northern Affairs Canada	First Nation(s)	Ethnic/national group	Tribal council	Treaty	ha	acre	2016	2011	% difference	Notes & references
Akwesasne 15	Mohawks of Akwesasne	Mohawk		n/a	3,646.8	9,011.4	1,202			Also in Ontario (Akwesasne 59) and New York, United States (St. Regis Mohawk Reservation)
Betsiamites	Pessamit Innu Band	Innu	Mamuitun Tribal Council	n/a	25,205.0	62,282.9	2,256	2,420	-6.8%	
Cacouna 22	Première Nation Wolastoqiyik (Malécite) Wahsipekuk	Maliseet		n/a	0.9	2.2				
Communauté Atikamekw De Manawan	Atikamekw of Manawan	Atikamekw	Conseil de la Nation Atikamekw	n/a	773.0	1,910.1	2,060	2,073	-0.6%	
Communauté De Wemotaci	Wemotaci Atikamekw Council	Atikamekw	Conseil de la Nation Atikamekw	n/a	3,331.0	8,231.1	1,213	1,194	1.6%	
Coucoucache 24A	Wemotaci Atikamekw Council	Atikamekw	Conseil de la Nation Atikamekw	n/a	5.6	13.8				
Doncaster 17	Mohawks of Kahnawá:ke / Mohawks of Kanesatake	Mohawk		n/a	7,900.0	19,521.3				
Gesgapegiag	Micmacs of Gesgapegiag	Miꞌkmaq	Mi'gmawei Mawiomi Secretariat	n/a	222.0	548.6	653	688	-5.1%	
Innue Essipit	Innue Essipit	Innu	Mamuitun Tribal Council	n/a	86.5	213.7	297	268	10.8%	
Kahnawake No.14	Mohawks of Kahnawá:ke	Mohawk		n/a	4,902.0	12,113.1				
Kataskomiq	Première Nation Wolastoqiyik (Malécite) Wahsipekuk	Maliseet		n/a	169.0	417.6				
Kebaowek	Kebaowek First Nation	Anishinaabe	Algonquin Anishinabeg Nation Tribal Council	n/a	50.6	125.0	274	284	-3.5%	
Kitigan Zibi	Kitigan Zibi Anishinabeg	Algonquin	Algonquin Anishinabeg Nation Tribal Council	n/a	21,009.0	51,914.4	1,221	1,401	-12.8%	
Lac John	Innu Nation of Matimekush-Lac John	Innu	Mamuitun Tribal Council	n/a	23.5	58.1	33	21	57.1%	
Lac Simon	Nation Anishnabe du Lac Simon	Anishinaabe	Algonquin Anishinabeg Nation Tribal Council	n/a	678.4	1,676.4	1,380	1,403	-1.6%	
Listuguj	Listuguj Miꞌgmaq First Nation	Miꞌkmaq	Mi'gmawei Mawiomi Secretariat	n/a	4,344.0	10,734.3	1,241	1,865	-33.5%	
Maliotenam 27A	Innu Takuaikan Uashat Mak Mani-Utenam	Innu	Mamuitun Tribal Council	n/a	527.0	1,302.2	1,542	1,316	17.2%	
Mashteuiatsh	Pekuakamiulnuatsh First Nation	Innu	Mamuitun Tribal Council	n/a	1,626.9	4,020.2	1,957	2,213	-11.6%	
Matimekosh 3	Innu Nation of Matimekush-Lac John	Innu	Mamuitun Tribal Council	n/a	65.4	161.6	613	540	13.5%	
Mingan	Innus of Ekuanitshit	Innu	Regroupement Mamit Innuat	n/a	3,838.0	9,483.9	552	453	21.9%	
Nutashkuan	Première Nation des Innus de Nutashkuan	Innu	Regroupement Mamit Innuat	n/a	118.9	293.8	835	841	-0.7%	
Obedjiwan 28	Atikamekw of Opitciwan	Atikamekw	Conseil de la Nation Atikamekw	n/a	927.0	2,290.7	2,019	2,031	-0.6%	
Odanak 12	Odanak First Nation	Abenaki	Grand Conseil de la Nation Waban-Aki	n/a	578.0	1,428.3	449	457	-1.8%	
Pikogan	Abitibiwinni First Nation	Algonquin	Algonquin Anishinabeg Nation Tribal Council	n/a	274.6	678.6	538	538	0.0%	
Rapid Lake	Algonquins of Barriere Lake	Algonquin	Algonquin Nation Programs and Services Secretariat	n/a	29.7	73.4				
Romaine 2	Montagnais de Unamen Shipu	Innu	Regroupement Mamit Innuat	n/a	69.4	171.5	977	1,016	-3.8%	
Timiskaming	Timiskaming First Nation	Algonquin	Algonquin Nation Programs and Services Secretariat	n/a	1,852.0	4,576.4	539	540	-0.2%	
Uashat 27	Innu Takuaikan Uashat Mak Mani-Utenam	Innu	Mamuitun Tribal Council	n/a	210.0	518.9	1,592	1,485	7.2%	
Village Des Hurons Wendake 7	Huron-Wendat Nation	Wyandot		n/a	133.4	329.6	2,134			
Village Des Hurons Wendake 7A	Huron-Wendat Nation	Wyandot		n/a	244.6	604.4				
Wôlinak 11	Wôlinak First Nation	Abenaki	Grand Conseil de la Nation Waban-Aki	n/a	80.4	198.7	202	180	12.2%	

== See also ==
- Indigenous peoples in Quebec
- List of Indian settlements in Quebec
- List of northern villages and Inuit reserved lands in Quebec
- List of Cree and Naskapi territories in Quebec
- Administrative divisions of Quebec
