= Naskapi Nation of Kawawachikamach =

- Band No. 81
- People: Naskapi,
- Headquarters: Kawawachikamach
- Province: Quebec

Land
- Main reserve: Kawawachikamach (Naskapi reserved land)
- Reserve: Kawawachikamach (Naskapi village municipality)
- Land area: 275.46 km^{2} (106.36 sq mi)

Population (October 2019)
- On reserve: 688
- On other land: 34
- Off reserve: 71
- Total population: 793

Government
- Chief: Theresa Chemaganish
- Council: Louise Nattawappio (Deputy Chief); Derek Jeremy Einish; Ronald Tooma; Stephen Mameanskum; David Swappie

Website
- Naskapi.ca

Naskapi Nation of Kawawachikamach (Naskapi: ᓇᔅᑲᐱ ᐃᔪᒡ ᐅᑕ ᑲᐛᐛᒋᑲᒪᒡ, romanized: Naskapi Iyuch Uta Kawâwâchikamach, French: Nation Naskapi de Kawawachikamach) is a First Nation band government in Quebec, Canada. The members of the band are ethnically Naskapi Innu and speak the Naskapi language. The Naskapi Nation of Kawawachikamach is the only Naskapi band in Quebec; there is another Naskapi band, Mushuau Innu First Nation located in Labrador.

== Location ==
Most members of the Nation live on their Terres réservées aux Naskapis or Naskapi reserved land (or Indian reserve) of Kawawachikamach, Quebec, approximately 16 kilometres (9.9 mi) north of Schefferville. Schefferville is not connected to the North American road network but is accessible by airplane via the Schefferville Airport or by train. Schefferville is the northern terminus of Tshiuetin Rail Transportation, which is partially owned by the Nation, with service to Sept-Îles, Quebec. The primary reserve, where the members live, is 33.37 square kilometres (12.88 sq mi). The band also has control of a Naskapi village municipality of the same name which is 242.09 square kilometres (93.47 sq mi). Somewhat contrary to the names, in Quebec, Terres réservées aux Naskapis are parcels of land set aside for the permanent residence of Naskapi First Nations. Village Naskapi are adjacent to Terres réservées aux Naskapis although its members do not reside there permanently.

== Population ==
As of October 2019, the Nation had a registered population of 793 with 688 people living on their reserve and 105 living off the reserve or on other (non-Kawawachikamach) lands. From Statistics Canada's 2016 Census, 601 people lived on the Kawawachikamach reserve up 2.6% from 586 in 2011 Census. With regards to speaking official languages, 70.3% reported only speaking English while only 1.7% reported speaking only French; 21.5% speak both official languages. 97.5% reported an indigenous language, most often Naskapi. is most spoken in the home.
