= Kawawachikamach =

Kawawachikamach may refer to two distinct and non-adjacent but conceptually connected places in Quebec:

- Naskapi Nation of Kawawachikamach
- Kawawachikamach, Quebec, a Naskapi reserved land with a few hundred inhabitants
- Kawawachikamach (Naskapi village municipality), an uninhabited area with no resident population
