= Tshiuetin Rail Transportation =

Railway on the Labrador–Quebec border in Canada

Tshiuetin

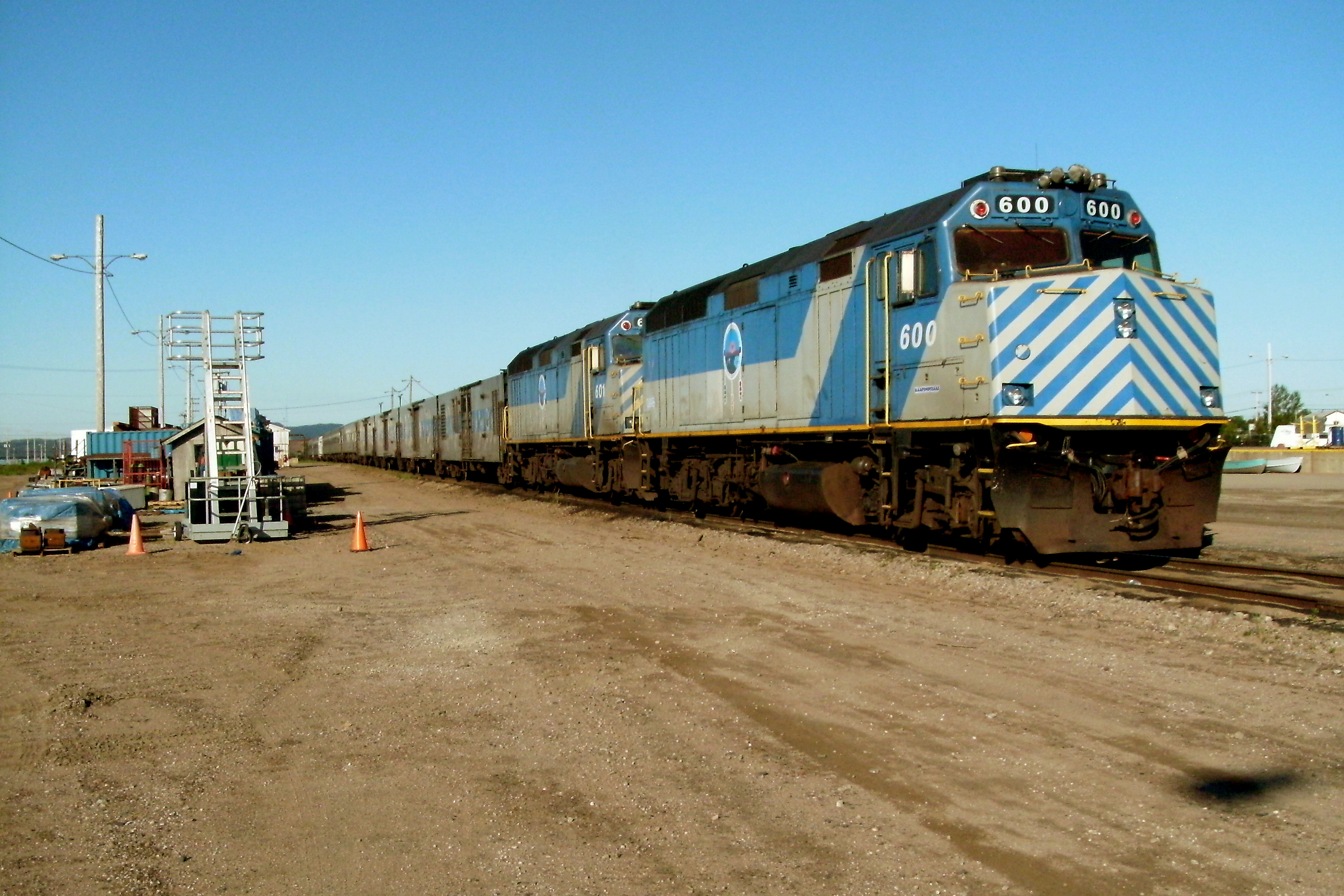
- A train at Sept-Îles departing for Schefferville

Overview
- Other name: North Wind
- Status: Active
- Owner: Innu Takuaikan Uashat Mak Mani-Utenam, Kawawachikamach, Matimekush-Lac John
- Locale: Quebec and Labrador
- Coordinates: 53.0676959°N 66.2031418°W
- Termini: Emeril; Schefferville
- Website: www.tshiuetin.net

Service
- Type: Heavy rail

History
- Opened: December 1, 2005; 20 years ago

Technical
- Track length: 217 km (135 mi)
- Track gauge: 1,435 mm (4 ft 8 1/2 in)

Tshiuetin Rail Transportation Inc. (French: Transport Ferroviaire Tshiuetin; reporting mark TSH, formerly TRT) is a rail company that owns and operates a 217-kilometre (135 mi) Canadian regional railway that stretches through the wilderness of western Labrador and northeastern Quebec, connecting Emeril Junction, Labrador with Schefferville, Quebec, on the interprovincial boundary. The company also operates passenger trains on the 356-kilometre (221 mi) of the Quebec North Shore & Labrador Railway between Sept-Îles, Quebec and Emeril Junction. The company is the first railway in North America owned and operated by Indigenous peoples, specifically by the Innu Nation of Matimekush-Lac John, the Naskapi Nation of Kawawachikamach, and the Innu Takuaikan Uashat Mak Mani-Utenam.

== History ==
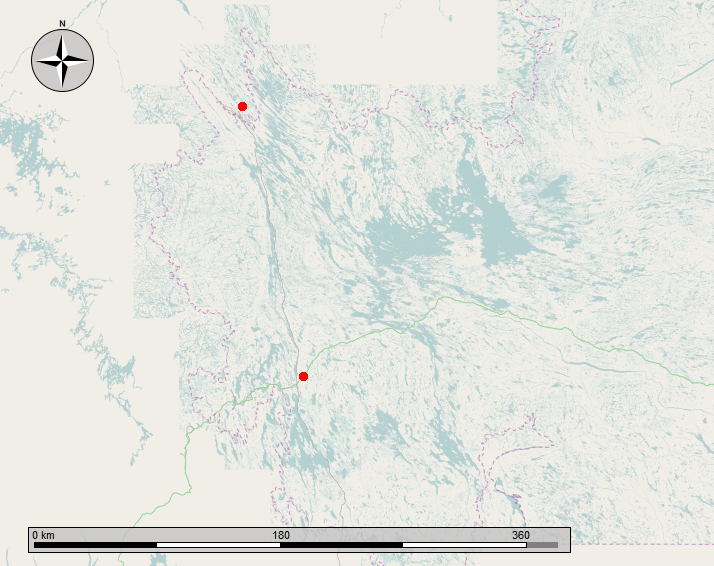
Map showing the rail line between the two red points of Schefferville (top) and Emeril Junction (bottom)

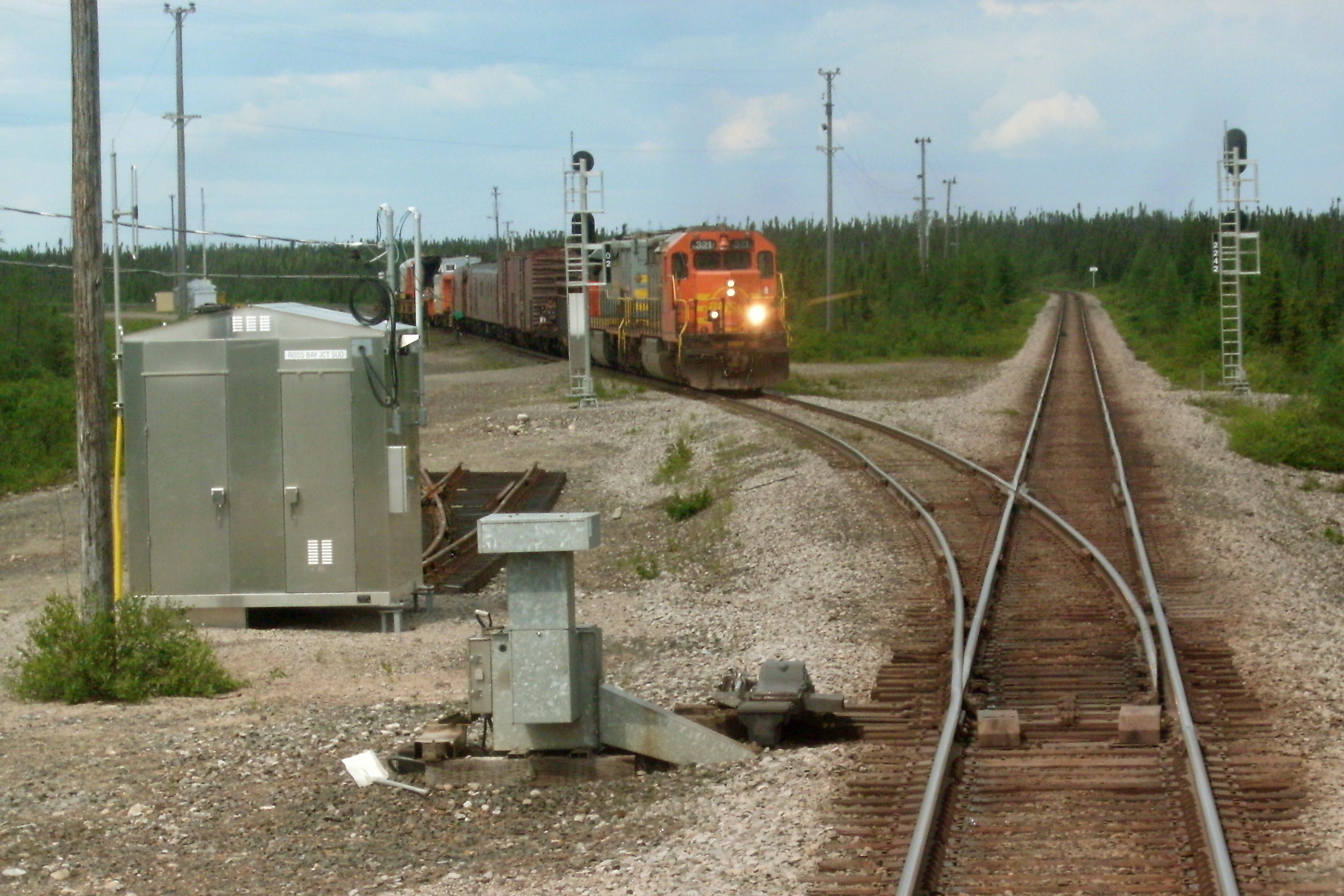
A train entering the main line at the Ross Bay Junction

Tshiuetin (/tʃiˈwɛtən/) Rail Transportation operates on the Menihek Subdivision, a rail line running from Emeril Junction to Schefferville. The Menihek Subdivision used to be part of the Quebec North Shore & Labrador (QNSX) main line, constructed between 1951 and 1954. After mining activity in Schefferville ended with the closure of the Schefferville iron mine in 1983, QNSX prioritized the Sept-Îles to Labrador City line instead, and the Emeril Jct to Schefferville line had limited freight and subsidized passenger service for the remaining First Nations communities in the region.

By 2006, passenger rail service was considered by the Canadian government to be the only surface transportation mode available to and from Schefferville. Preceding the purchase of the Menihek Subdivision, QNSX was actively looking to sell off the rail line, but no other pre-existing railroad companies made purchase offers. Three local First Nation councils formed a single company to buy the line from QNSX.

In 2004, Tshiuetin Rail was issued a certificate of fitness by the Canadian Transportation Agency, before the railroad acquired the Menihek Subdivision. The company took possession of the Menihek Subdivision "as is, where is". The company was to provide all passenger rail and limited freight service. The company will also provide passenger rail service on the remaining QNSX-owned line running from the port of Sept-Îles to Emeril Jct (and on to Schefferville).

Tshiuetin Rail began operations on December 1, 2005, with the conclusion of an agreement between the three owners of Tshiuetin Rail and the owners of the Quebec North Shore and Labrador Railway (QNSX), Rail Enterprises Incorporated and Iron Ore Company of Canada. Under this agreement, finalized in the fall of 2005, QNSX sold its Menihek Subdivision, for the nominal sum of $1.

The agreement between IOC and the three First Nations who own Tshiuetin Rail has resulted in the first aboriginal ownership of a railway line in Canada. TRT employs about 100 people, of which over 80% are indigenous.

Since 2011 local mining interests have returned to the area. In 2021, TRT carried 2.3 million tonnes of minerals.

This railway (along with the QNSX line, Chemin de fer Arnaud, and Wabush Lake Railway) form an isolated railway network, as it does not have a physical connection with the North American rail network; however Compagnie de gestion de Matane operates a rail ferry service which carries trains between Sept-Îles and the port at Matane (which does connect to the North American rail network).

== Service ==
Two weekly round-trips run between Sept-Îles and Schefferville. The full trip typically takes 13 to 15 hours in each direction.

As of 2022, Tshiuetin carried 12,000 passengers annually.

== Rolling stock ==
Tshiuetin Rail uses six refurbished diesel locomotives (GP38-2W and SD40-2), either owned or leased.

Tshiuetin Rail uses six passenger coaches originally built for the Pennsylvania Railroad "Congressional Limited" between New York and Washington, and then operated by Amtrak until the early 2000s. TRT's diner car, three baggage cars and two power cars also are former Amtrak stock. The old passenger cars are slated for modernization through the Canadian Railway Services (CRWS) train refurbishment program, with Canada Infrastructure Bank (CIB) providing a $50 million loan.

== In media ==
The importance of the line is documented in Caroline Monnet's 2016 short film Tshiuetin.

On July 6, 2020, Chloë Ellingson of the New York Times published an extensive pictorial essay on the railway.
