= Matimekosh =

- Indian reserve
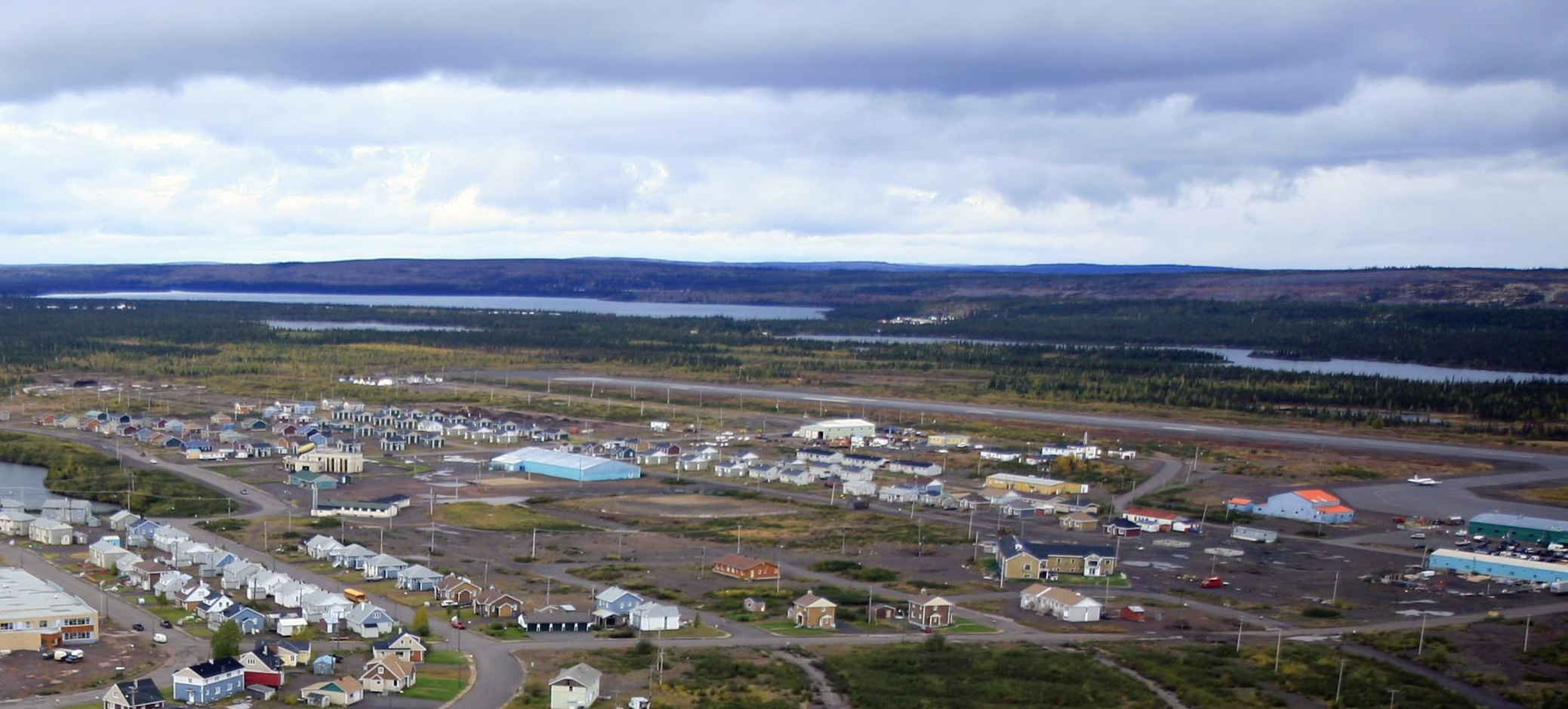

- Location in Côte-Nord Region of Quebec.
- Coordinates: 54°48′30″N 66°49′25″W
- Country: Canada
- Province: Quebec
- Region: Côte-Nord
- Regional county: None
- Settled: 1972
- Formed: 1968

Government
  - Chief: Pako Vachon
  - Federal riding: Côte-Nord—Kawawachikamach—Nitassinan
  - Prov. riding: Duplessis

Area
  - Total: 0.65 km^{2} (0.25 sq mi)
  - Land: 0.69 km^{2} (0.27 sq mi)
- There is an apparent contradiction between two authoritative sources

Population (2021)
  - Total: 661
  - Density: 963/km^{2} (2,490/sq mi)
  - Change (2016–21): ▲3.6%
  - Dwellings: 227
- Time zone: UTC-5 (EST)
  - Summer (DST): UTC-4 (EDT)
- Postal Code: G0G 2T0
- Area codes: 418 and 581
- Website: https://matimekush.com/

Matimekosh (or Matimekush, officially Matimekosh 3) is a First Nations reserve on Lake Pearce in the Côte-Nord region of Quebec, Canada. Together with the Lac-John Reserve, it belongs to the Innu Nation of Matimekush-Lac John. It is an enclave in the centre of the Municipality of Schefferville, and geographically within the Caniapiscau Regional County Municipality but administratively not part of it. Matimekosh means "small trout".

Matimekosh is only accessible by airplane via the Schefferville Airport or by train via Tshiuetin Rail Transportation from Sept-Îles. It is serviced by a nursing station, community radio station, library, arena, community centre, and an aboriginal police force, while water, sewer, and fire protection services are provided by the municipality of Schefferville.

== History ==
The region was regularly visited by Innu indigenous people for hunting and trapping, but they did not permanently reside there. Because of mining development in the early 1950s, some 200 Naskapi from Fort Chimo were relocated to Schefferville in 1955 and settled near the train station in shacks built with scavenged materials. In 1956, a dozen Innu families from Maliotenam, near Sept-Îles, arrived and set up an encampment at Knob Lake, near the present airport. They served as guides for geological exploration work, and helped on the railway construction from Sept-Îles.

In 1957, the Schefferville municipal authorities moved the Innu and Naskapi to a site on John Lake, some four miles north-north-east of Schefferville, where they lived in poverty without water, sewage, electricity, schools, and medical facility. Initially living in tiny shacks, by 1962 Indian and Northern Affairs had built 30 houses for them.

In 1967, the Government of Canada purchased land from the reluctant Municipality of Schefferville a marshy 37 acres (15 ha) site on Pearce Lake north of the town centre. On August 21, 1968, this land became a reserve for the Innu and Naskapi, but they didn't relocate there until 1972 following long and difficult negotiations.

In the 1970s, the Naskapi began negotiations for a settlement of their Aboriginal claims. In 1978, they ceded any rights or interests to the Matimekosh Reserve as a prerequisite to the Northeastern Québec Agreement that provided for the formation of their own reserve. In 1983, they moved to the nearby Kawawachikamach Reserve and left the Innu as the sole occupants of the Matimekosh Reserve.

In 1982, the Iron Ore Company of Canada closed its mines near Schefferville and most of the town's population left. In 1985 and 1995, the Government of Canada purchased more land in the defunct Municipality of Schefferville and added this to the reserve in 1996 and 1998, bringing redevelopment to the reserve through the recovery of some of the town's infrastructure.

== Demographics ==
As of 2022, the band counted 1,042 members, of which 849 persons are living in the community. The reserve counted 203 private dwellings occupied by usual residents, out of a total of 227. Mother tongues are:

- English as first language: 2.3%
- French as first language: 6.1%
- English and French as first language: 0%
- Other as first language: 85.6%

Population trend:

- Population in 2021: 661 (2016 to 2021 population change: 3.6%)
- Population in 2016: 638
- Population in 2011: 540
- Population in 2006: 528
- Population in 2001: 449
- Population in 1996: 147 (or 397 when adjusted for 2001 boundaries)
- Population in 1991: 389
- Population in 1986: 395
- Population in 1981: 757

== Economy ==
The local economy is based mostly on goods and services. Other businesses on the reserve are primarily community businesses providing services such as a convenience store, pharmacy, and gas station, as well as heavy equipment services, auto mechanics, camping suppliers, plumbers, and outfitters.

Economic development is promoted by the organization Corporation de développement économique Matimekush - Lac John.

== Infrastructure ==
The isolated community is not connected to the provincial road network but is accessible by airplane via the Schefferville Airport or by train. The neighboring town of Schefferville being the northern terminus of Tshiuetin Rail Transportation with service to Sept-Îles.

== Education ==
There is only one school on the reserve, École Kanatamat Tshitipenitamunu, that provides pre-Kindergarten to Secondary 4 (grade 10), and had an enrolment of 114 students in 2008–2009.
