= Innu Nation of Matimekush-Lac John =

Coordinates: 54°48′30″N 66°49′22″W

- Band No. 87
- People: Innu
- Headquarters: Schefferville
- Province: Quebec

Land
- Main reserve: Matimekosh
- Reserve: Lac-John
- Land area: 0.889 km^{2} (0.343 sq mi)

Population (October 2019)
- On reserve: 851
- On other land: 60
- Off reserve: 127
- Total population: 1038

Government
- Chief: Pako Vachon
- Council: Pier-Luc Andre; Donavan Ambroise; Dan-George Gabriel; Eloise Tremblay

Tribal Council
- Mamuitun Tribal Council

Website
- Matimekush.com

Innu Nation of Matimekush-Lac John (or La Nation Innu Matimekush-Lac John in French) is a First Nation band government based out of Schefferville, Quebec, Canada. The members of the band are Innu people and speak the Innu language, an Algonquian language which is a member of the Cree–Montagnais–Naskapi dialect continuum.

== Location ==
Schefferville is in northern Quebec less than 2 km (1.2 mi) from the border with Labrador. It is located within the Caniapiscau Regional County Municipality in the Côte-Nord (or North Coast) region of Quebec. The Nation controls two Indian reserves: Matimekosh 3 is a 65.4-hectare (162-acre) enclave in the center of the Town of Schefferville; and Lac-John is 23.5 hectares (58 acres) located about 2 kilometres (1.2 mi) north of Schefferville. Schefferville, and hence the reserves, is not connected to the North American highway system. The community is accessible via air through Schefferville Airport or via rail on Tshiuetin Rail Transportation which is partially owned by the band.

== Population ==
As of October 2019, the Nation had a registered population of 1,038 people with 851 people living on the two reserves. For Statistics Canada's 2016 Canadian Census, Matimekosh had 613 residents up 13.5% from 540 residents found in the 2011 Canadian Census. Lac-John had 33 residents in 2016 up 57.1% from 21 in 2011. In the 2016 Census, 94.6% of the band spoke an Indigenous language at home with 86.8% first learned an Indigenous language. 7.0% can speak only English, 54.3% can speak only French, 27.9% can speak both, while 10.9% cannot speak either official language.

== Governance ==
The Nation has a five member council with a chief and four councilors. For the 2019–2022 tenure, Réal McKenzie is the chief.
