= Kawawachikamach, Quebec =

Kawawachikamach ᑲᐛᐛᒋᑲᒪᒡ
- Naskapi reserved land
- Location in Côte-Nord Region of Quebec.
- Coordinates: 54°52′N 66°46′W
- Country: Canada
- Province: Quebec
- Region: Côte-Nord
- RCM: None
- Constituted: September 10, 1981

Government
  - Chief: Theresa Chemaganish
  - Federal riding: Côte-Nord—Kawawachikamach—Nitassinan
  - Prov. riding: Duplessis

Area
  - Total: 41.20 km^{2} (15.91 sq mi)
  - Land: 32.51 km^{2} (12.55 sq mi)

Population (2021)
  - Total: 641
  - Density: 19.7/km^{2} (51/sq mi)
  - Pop (2016–21): ▲6.7%
  - Dwellings: 203
- Time zone: UTC−5 (EST)
  - Summer (DST): UTC−4 (EDT)
- Postal code(s): G0G 2Z0
- Area codes: 418 and 581

Kawawachikamach (Naskapi: ᑲᐛᐛᒋᑲᒪᒡ, romanized: Kawâwâchikamach) is a Naskapi/Iyiyiw First Nations reserve and community at the south end of Lake Matemace (where it joins Lake Peter), approximately 15 kilometres (9.3 mi) northeast of Schefferville, Quebec, Canada. It belongs to the Naskapi Nation of Kawawachikamach. The village was built by the Naskapi/Iyiyiw from 1980 to 1983. The language spoken is Iyiyiw-Imuun, a dialect closely related to Innu and Iynu (East Cree). The name means "the winding river".

Access to the village is by way of Schefferville Airport or railway from Sept-Îles to Schefferville, then by way of a 15 km (9.3 mi) road from the centre of Schefferville. With the demise of Schefferville as a residential centre for the iron ore mining operations, Kawawachikamach and Matimékush are now the main communities in the region.

Telephone and postal services are provided from the Schefferville exchange by Telebec and from the Schefferville Post Office, while electricity is provided by the Schefferville Power Company. The Naskapi/Iyiyiw provide their own policing services. Sichuun provides Internet, VoIP, cellular and IPTV services to the Kawawachikamach/Schefferville region. Other services include a community radio station, a healthcare centre, a recreation centre and a gymnasium.

== Legal status ==
Its formal legal status is a Naskapi Reserved Land (terre réservée naskapie, category 1-AN, under federal jurisdiction). There is also a separate, non-contiguous Naskapi Village Municipality (municipalité de village naskapie, category 1-BN, under provincial jurisdiction) of the same name, some distance to the north. The entire population lives on the Reserved Land; despite its title, the Naskapi Village Municipality of Kawawachikamach has no resident population and is for the exclusive use of Naskapi for hunting or other activities. The Naskapi Reserved Land is south of the 55th parallel and is geographically located within the Caniapiscau Regional County Municipality of the Côte-Nord region of Quebec, although not juridically a part of it; the Naskapi Village Municipality is north of 55 and is within the Kativik Territory.

The Commission de toponymie du Québec, perhaps a bit confusingly, refers to the Naskapi Reserved Land as a "Naskapi village" (village naskapi) and the Naskapi Village Municipality as a "Naskapi village municipality" (municipalité de village naskapi), making a careful distinction between the two. However, from a practical point of view it seems intuitive that the "village" is where the population lives.

== History ==
The Naskapi of Kawawachikamach were originally from northern Quebec, but were subjected to relocations several times before moving from Fort Chimo to Schefferville in 1956. Government officials may have induced or ordered this move but did nothing in preparation for their arrival in Schefferville. The Naskapi settled near the airport in shacks built with scavenged materials, but they were relocated again by the Schefferville municipal authorities to a site on John Lake, where they lived in poverty without water, sewage, electricity, schools, and medical facility. In 1968, the Matimekosh Reserve was formed, and the Naskapi moved there in 1972, together with the Innu.

In the 1970s, the Naskapi began negotiations for a settlement of their aboriginal claims. In 1978, they ceded any rights or interests to the Matimekosh Reserve as a prerequisite to the Northeastern Québec Agreement that provided for the formation of their own reserve. As part of this agreement's implementation, 41.44 square kilometres (16.00 sq mi) of land was transferred from the Government of Quebec to the Government of Canada for the exclusive benefit of the Naskapi band in 1981. By 1983, the first residents settled in the village that was specifically adapted to the environment.

== Demographics ==
As of May 2022, the band counted 797 members, of whom 691 persons are living in the community.

Population trend:

- Population in 2021: 641 (2016 to 2021 population change: 6.7%)
- Population in 2016: 601 (2011 to 2016 population change: 2.6%)
- Population in 2011: 586 (2006 to 2011 population change: 3.0%)
- Population in 2006: 569
- Population in 2001: 540
- Population in 1996: 487
- Population in 1991: 405

Private dwellings occupied by usual residents: 194 (total dwellings: 203)

Mother tongue:

- English as first language: 2.6%
- French as first language: 1.8%
- English and French as first language: 0%
- Other as first language: 95.6%

== Economy ==
The local economy is based mostly on arts and handicraft, trapping, tourism, outfitters, construction and transport. The Naskapi are developing several major projects of social, educational, cultural and economic scope, such as road and runway maintenance, hydro-electric facilities, caribou hunting and fishing operations.
