= Emeril, Newfoundland and Labrador =

Emeril
- Unincorporated community
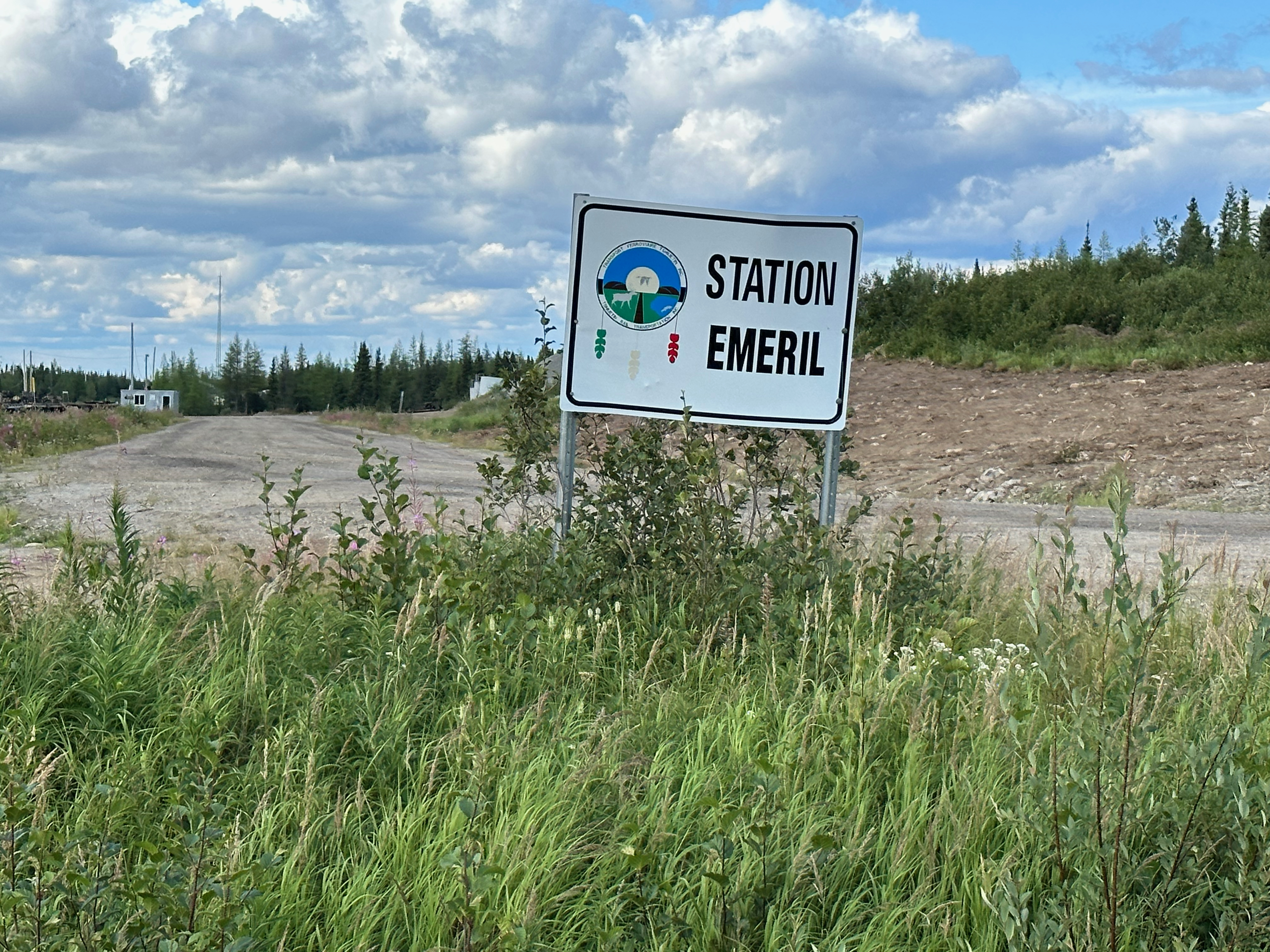
- Entrance sign for the Tshiuetin Rail Transportation station in Emeril

- Location of Emeril in Labrador
- Country: Canada
- Province: Newfoundland and Labrador
- Census division: 10

Government
  - MHA: Jordan Brown
  - MP: Yvonne Jones
- Elevation: 523 m (1,716 ft)
- Time zone: UTC-4 (AST)
  - Summer (DST): UTC-3 (Atlantic Daylight Saving Time)
- Area code: 709
- Highways: Route 500 (Trans-Labrador Highway)

Emeril is an unincorporated community in the Canadian province of Newfoundland and Labrador.

It is a sparsely populated area located around 50 km (31 mi) northeast of Labrador City on the Trans-Labrador Highway and serves as an intermediate stop on Tshiuetin Rail Transportation's train from Sept-Îles, Quebec to Schefferville.

== See also ==
- List of communities in Newfoundland and Labrador
