= Côte-Nord =

- Region 09
- Motto: Entre nature et démesure (French); Between nature and grandeur
- Côte-Nord in Quebec province
- Coordinates: 50°52′N 65°49′W
- Country: Canada
- Province: Québec

Government
  - Regional conference of elected officers: Micheline Anctil (President)

Area
  - Total: 300,281.83 km^{2} (115,939.46 sq mi)
  - Land: 234,442.27 km^{2} (90,518.67 sq mi)
- Total area includes disputed land within Labrador

Population (2021)
  - Total: 88,525
  - Density: 0.4/km^{2} (1.0/sq mi)

Time zones
- Minganie and West of 63rd meridian west: UTC-05:00 (EST)
  - Summer (DST): UTC-04:00 (EDT)
- East of 63rd meridian west, except Minganie: UTC-04:00 (AST)
- Website: Côte-Nord

Côte-Nord (Region 09) (French: [kot nɔʁ], Quebec French: [kou̯t nɑɔ̯ʁ]; lit. 'North Coast') is an administrative region of Quebec, on the Quebec-Labrador Peninsula, Canada.

The region runs along the St. Lawrence River and then the Gulf of St. Lawrence, from Tadoussac to the limits of Labrador, leaning against the Saguenay–Lac-Saint-Jean to the west, the Côte-Nord penetrates deep into Northern Quebec.

With the motto Between nature and grandeur, the Côte-Nord is made up of 99% public land, it is the second largest region after Nord-du-Québec, which occupies 51% of Quebec's territory.

== History ==
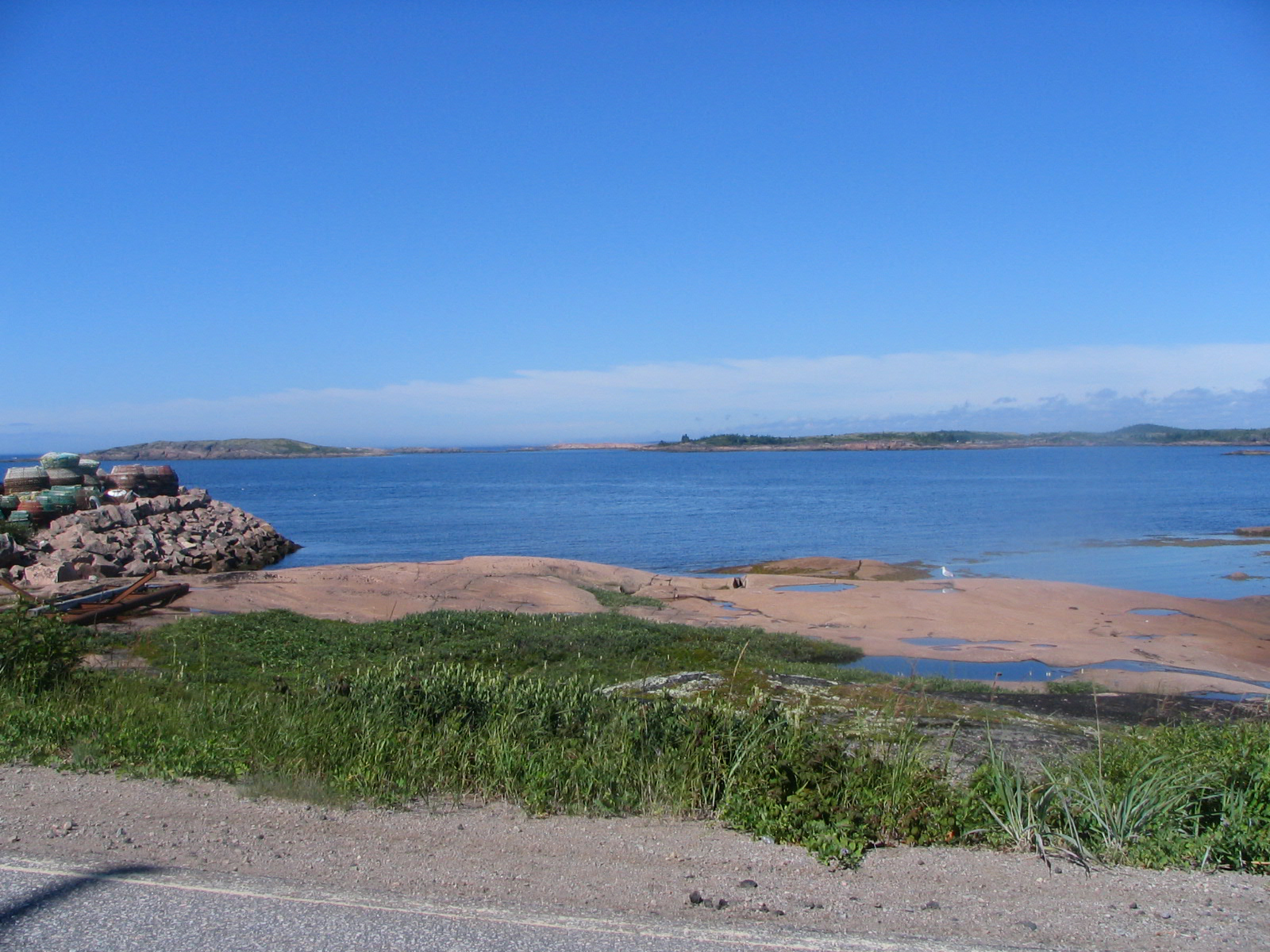
Gulf of St. Lawrence, landscape of the Côte-Nord shore, Natashquan

The origins of the settlement of the Côte-Nord precede by a few millennia the population movements that began in the middle of the 19th century.

Archaeologists tell us that the main prehistoric cultures, called "archaic", were based on three sets of groups coming from the southwest, from as far away as the Great Lakes by the St. Lawrence River, those coming from the great plateaus of the interior and James Bay and those from Newfoundland, Nova Scotia and New England.

From the 14th to the 17th century, known history, the presence of Europeans in the regions of the North Shore and the Gulf of Saint Lawrence began with the periodic visits of the Basques and Breton fishermen. Until the advent of the World War II (1939–1945) the growth of the population occurred in concert with the development of the pulp and paper industry.

In the 1950s, mining caused massive immigration.

"...From Kegashka to Blanc-Sablon, the inhabitants are individualistic, dwell on Crown Lands — often as squatters — and keep jealously to their self-appropriated fishing spots, whence their dispersion." (Bussières, P., p.1, 1963)

== Geography ==
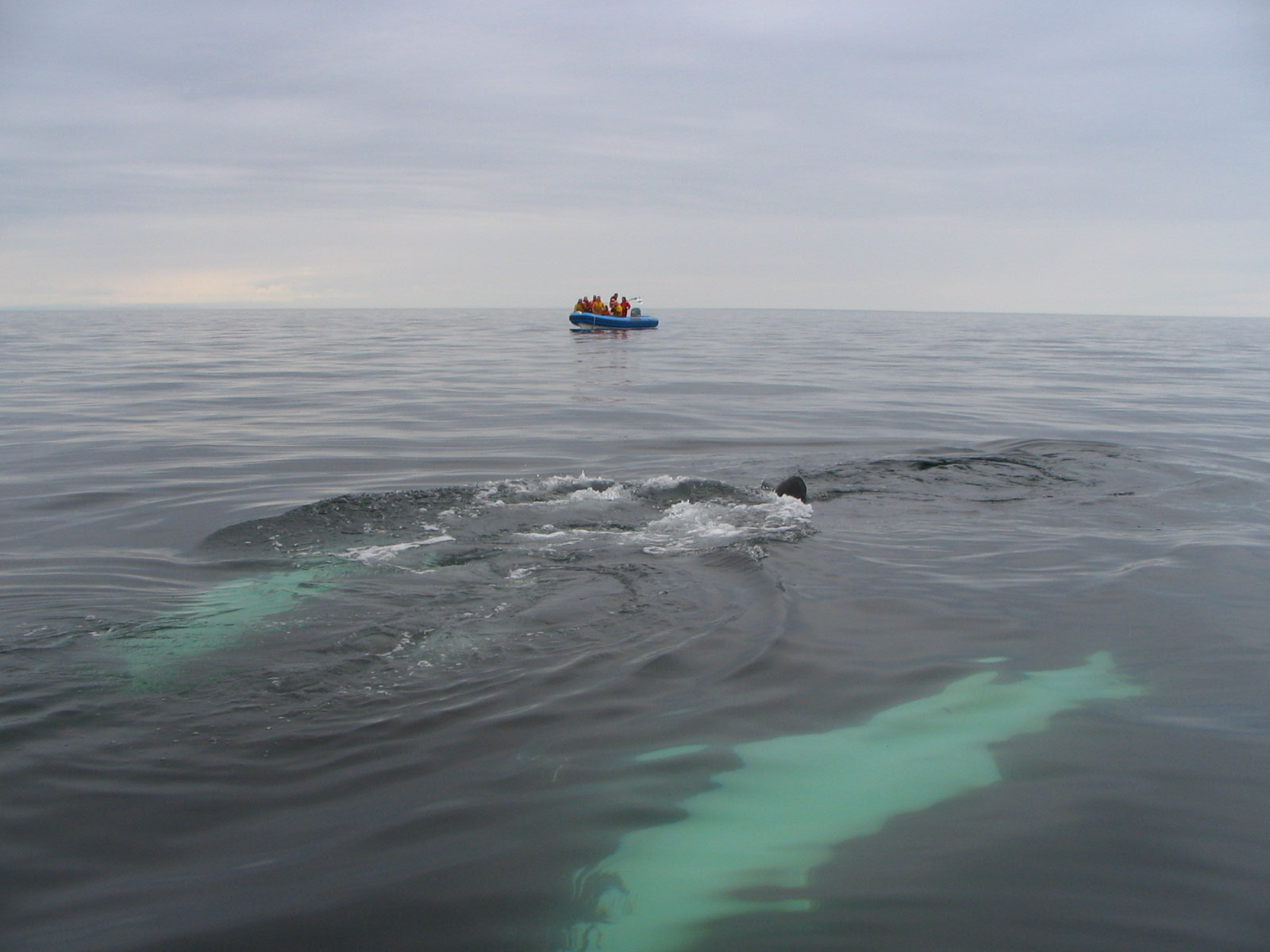
Whale watching excursion in the Gulf of St. Lawrence

The Côte-Nord is bounded to the west by the Capitale-Nationale and Saguenay–Lac-Saint-Jean regions and, to the north, by the Nord-du-Québec region and by Labrador. To the south, it extends from Tadoussac to the east of Blanc-Sablon, encompassing Anticosti Island and part of the Estuary and Gulf of St. Lawrence.

Côte-Nord was created as an administrative region in 1966. Stretching over nearly 1,250 km and with an area of 196,058 km^{2}, the administrative region roughly includes the basins of all the rivers that flow into the St. Lawrence between Tadoussac and Blanc-Sablon.

Important landmarks of Côte-Nord include Anticosti Island, the Mingan Archipelago National Park Reserve, and the Manicouagan Reservoir.

A territorial dispute between Quebec and Newfoundland and Labrador concerning the border between Côte-Nord and Labrador was set on 2 March 1927 by the Judicial Committee of the Privy Council. The boundary was entrenched in the Canadian constitution upon Newfoundland joining confederation in 1949. While this border has not been formally accepted by the Quebec government, the Henri Dorion Commission (Commission d'étude sur l'intégrité du territoire du Québec) concluded in the early 1970s that Quebec no longer has a legal claim to Labrador.

== Protection of natural heritage ==
Several portions of territory on the Côte-Nord are dedicated specifically to the protection and maintenance of biological diversity. The region has 262 wildlife habitats, 172 aquatic bird concentration areas, 12 heronries, 66 bird colonies on islands, peninsulas or cliffs, 4 muskrat habitats and 8 white-tailed deer containment areas on Anticosti Island.

Overview of the diversity

Geographical heritage

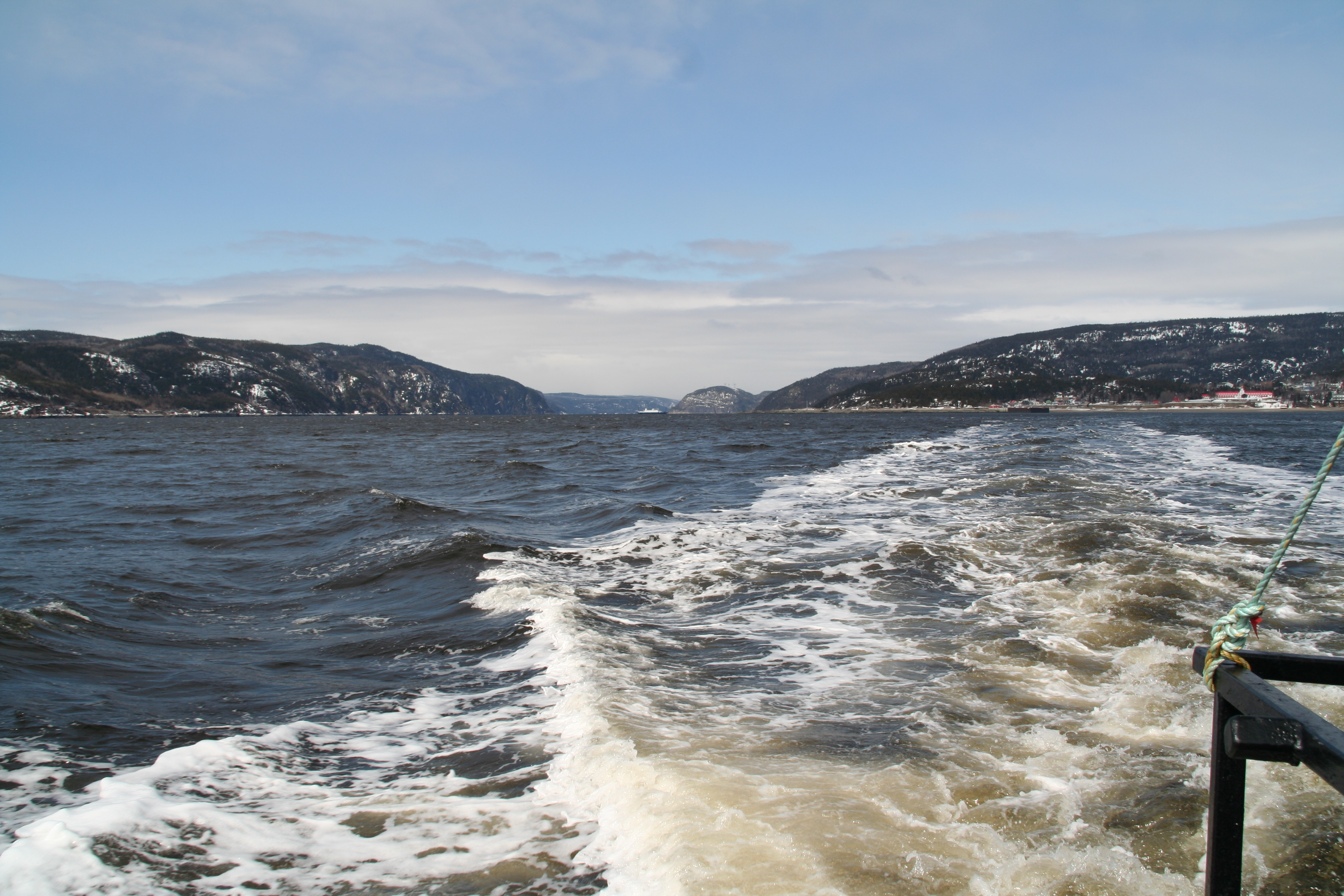
Saguenay–St. Lawrence Marine Park

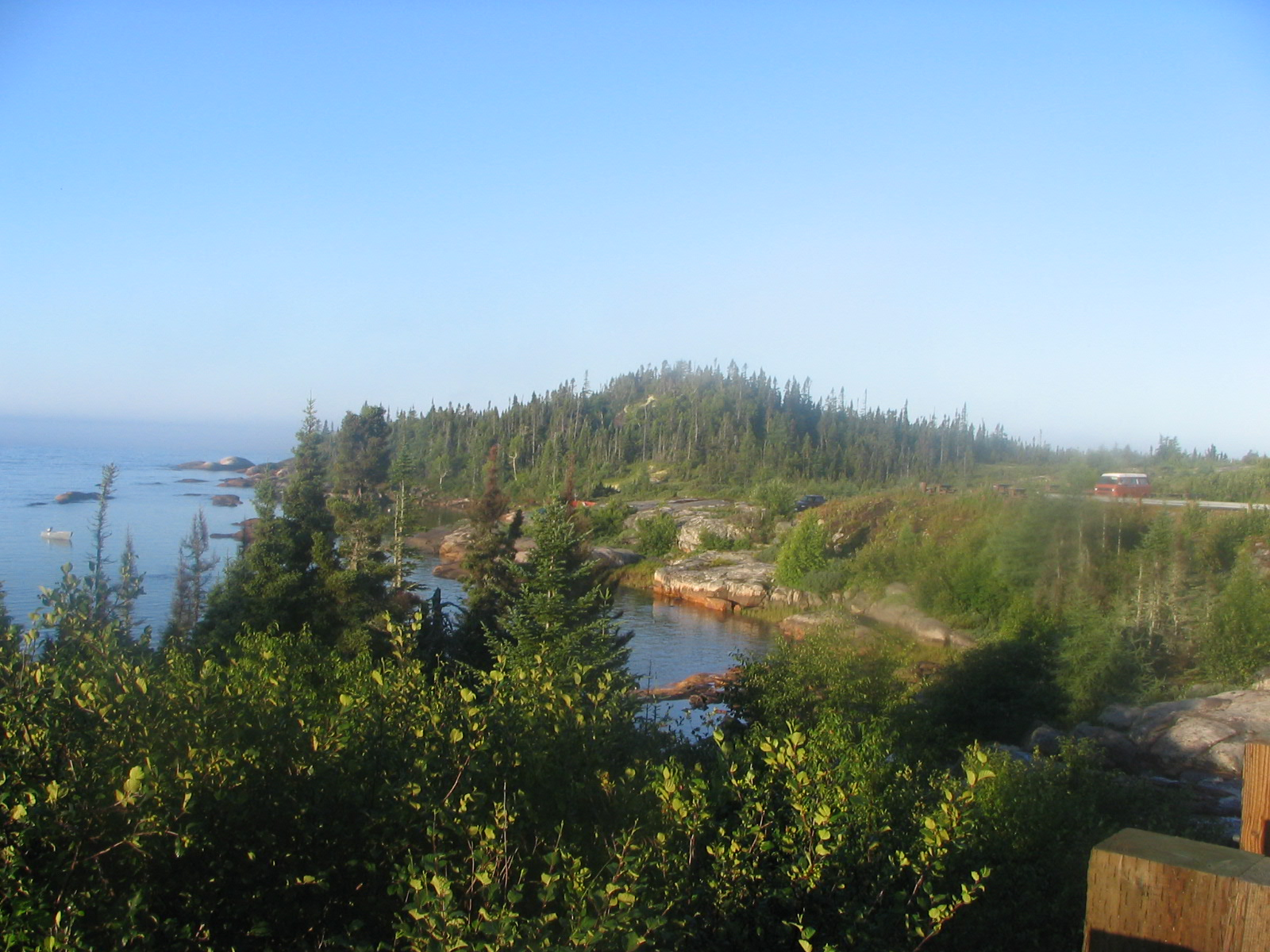
Wastishou Migratory Bird Sanctuary

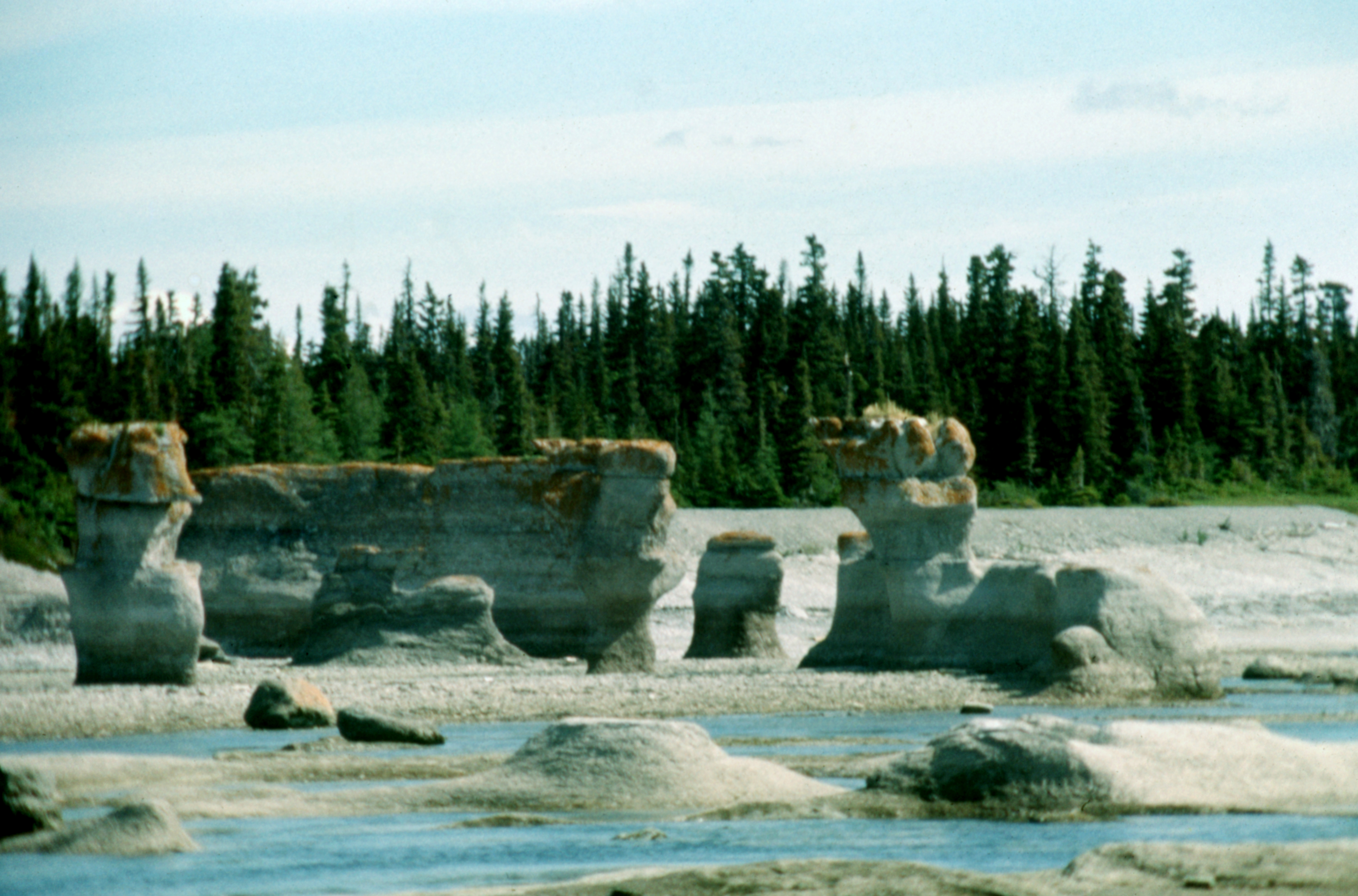
Mingan Archipelago National Park Reserve, geological site

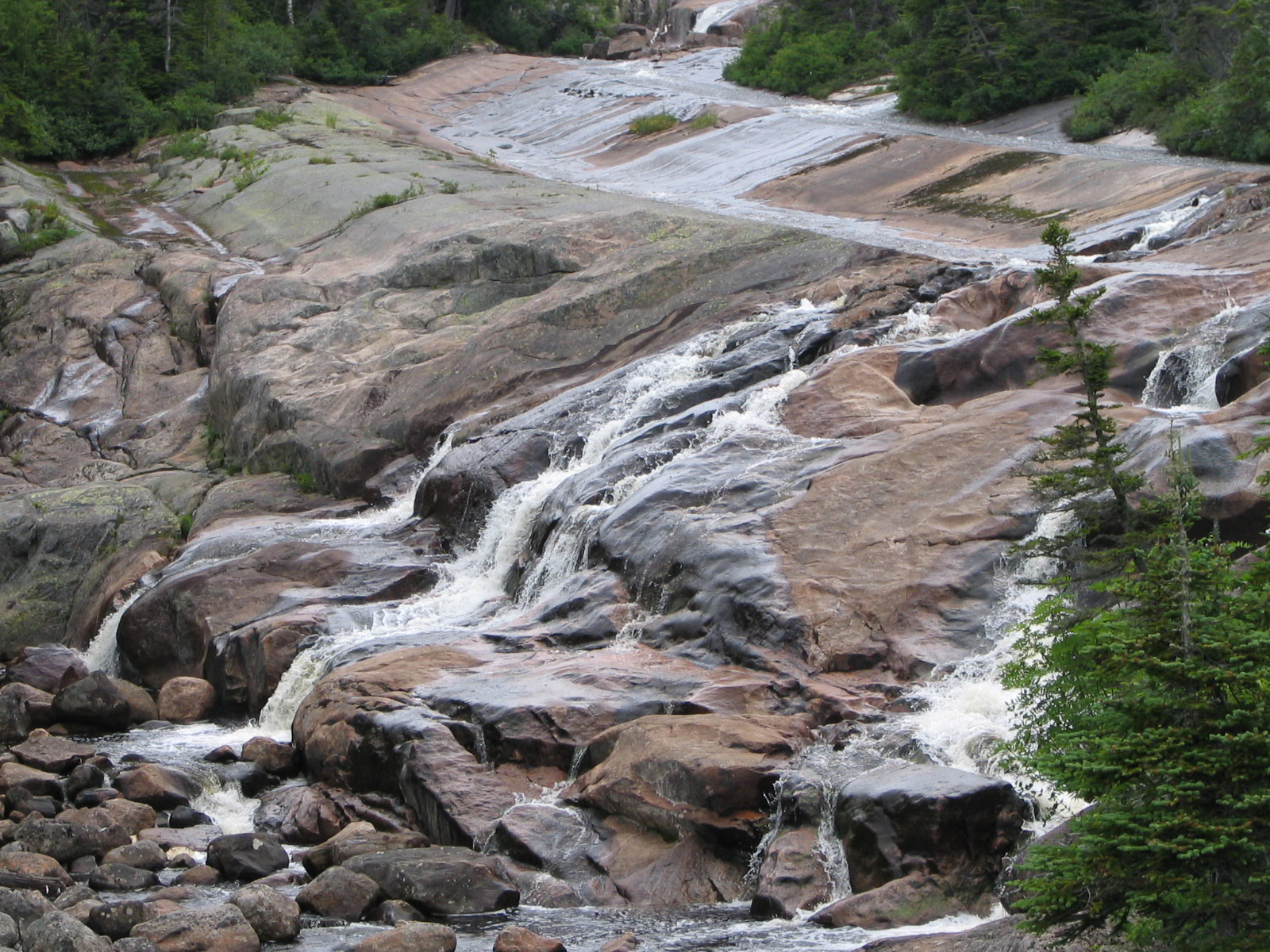
Sault Plat River, geological site

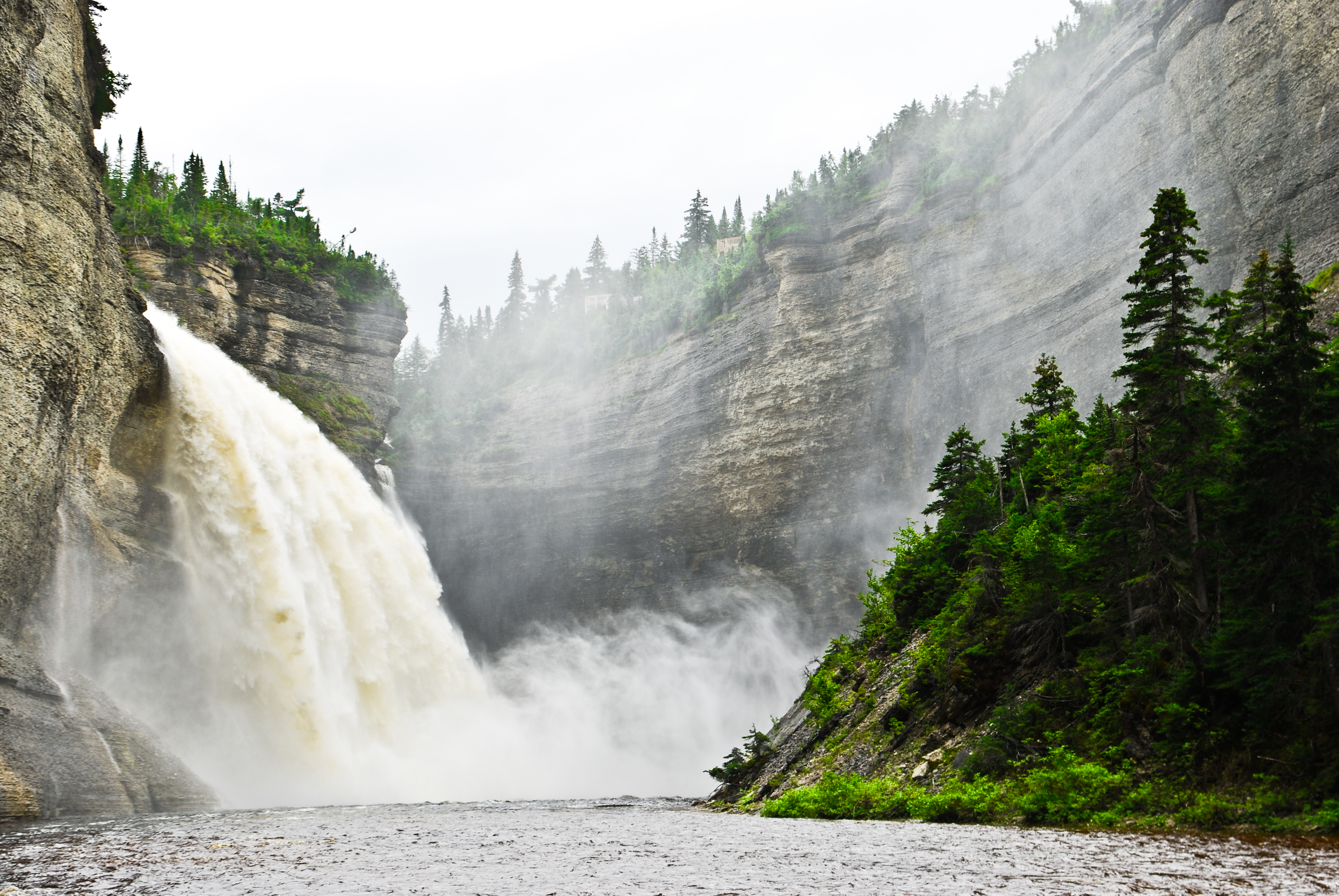
Anticosti Island UNESCO's World Heritage
Biological heritage

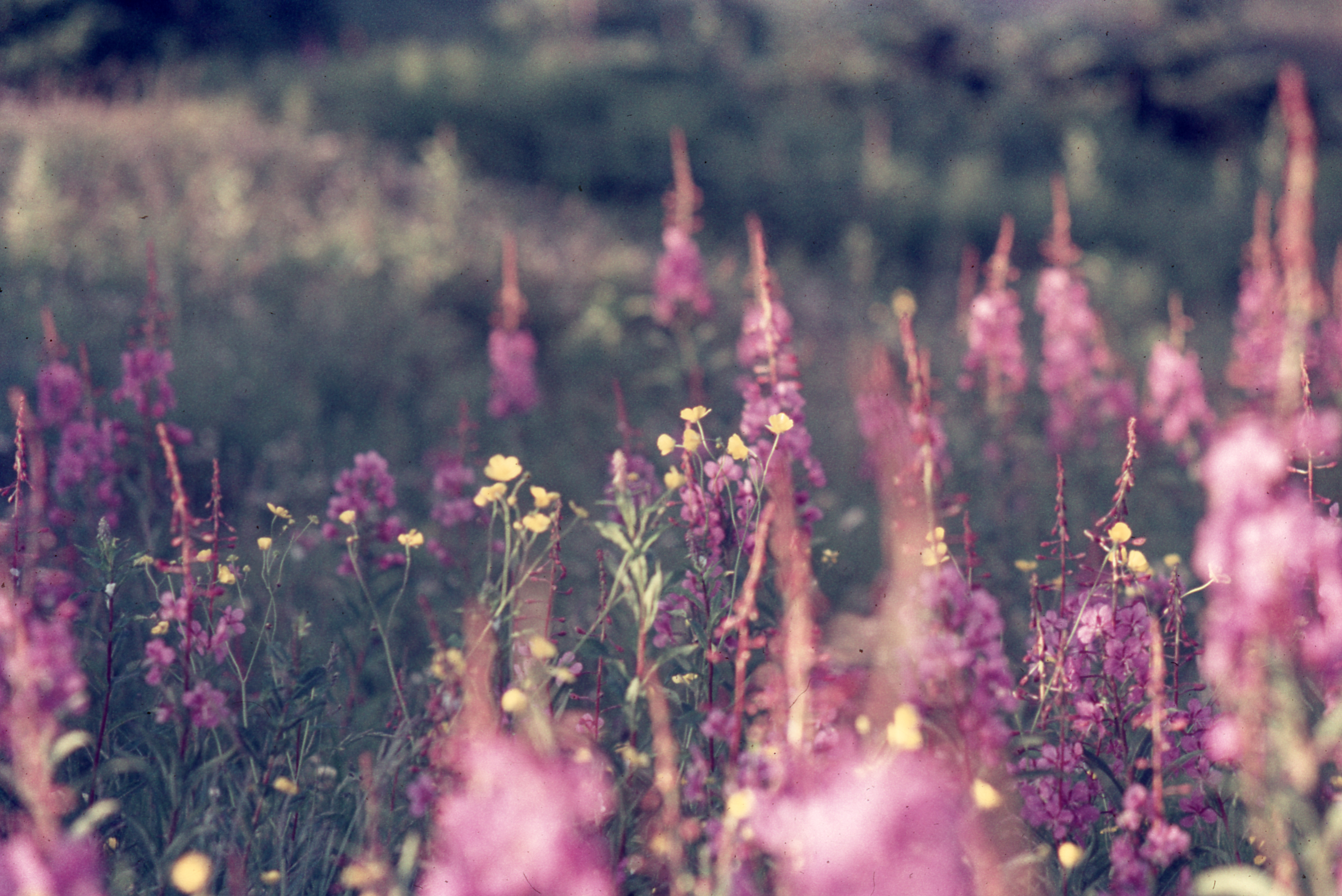
Epilobium angustifolium Linné. — Épilobe à feuilles étroites. — Bouquets rouges. — (Fireweed).

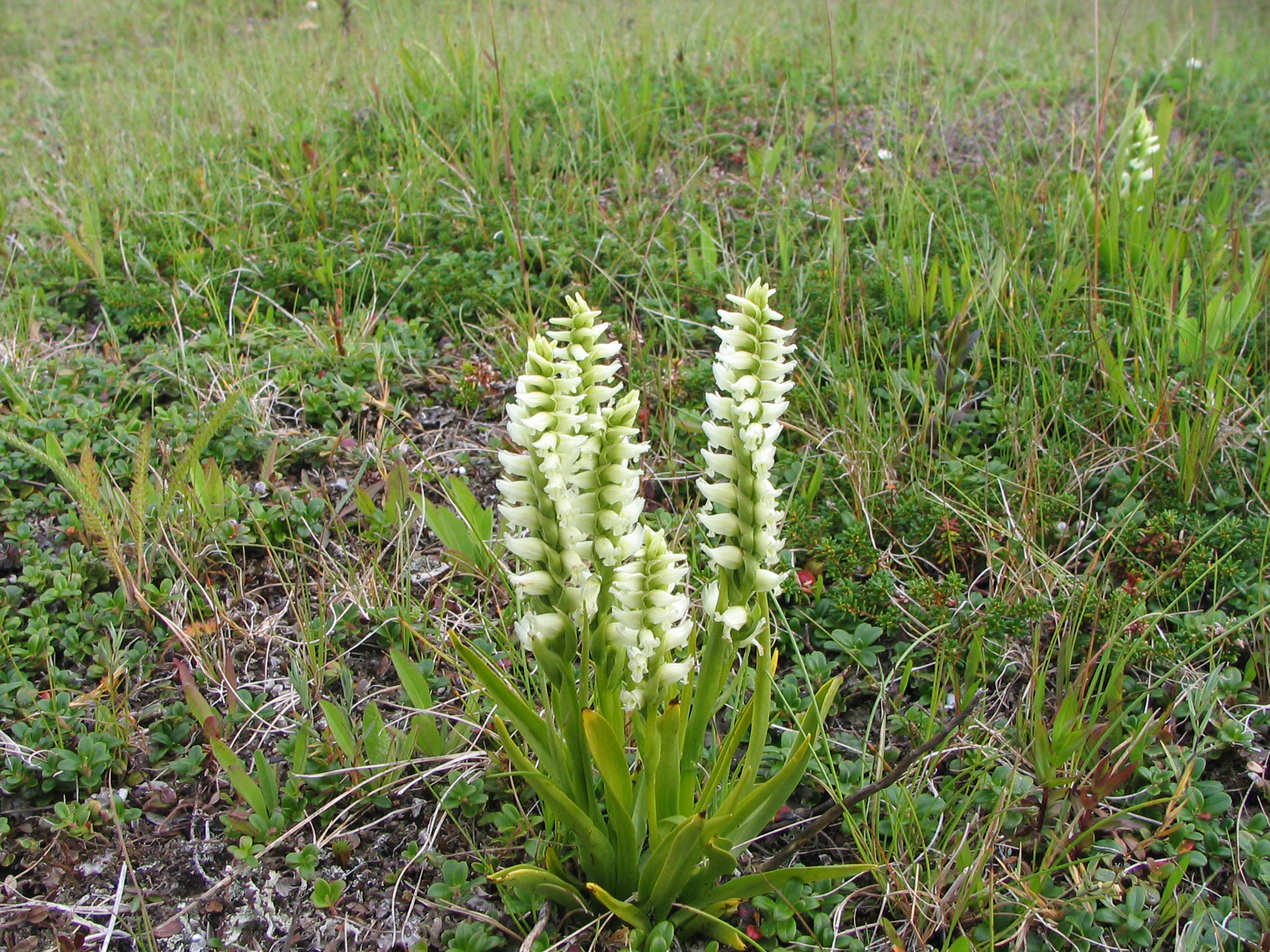
Spiranthes romanzoffiana Chamisso. – Spiranthe de Romanzoff. – (Romanzoff's ladies'-tresses).

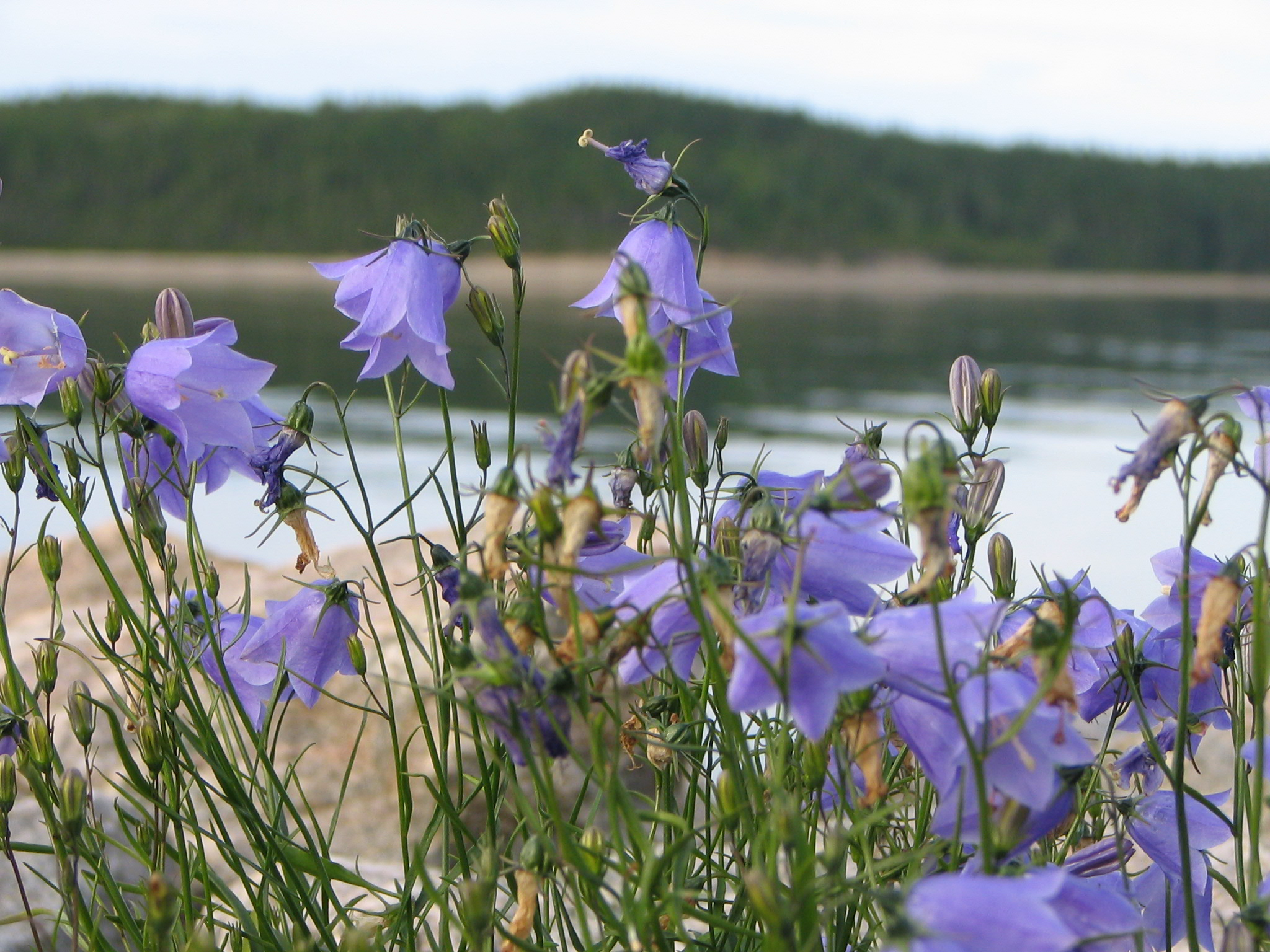
Campanula rotundifolia Linné. – Campanule à feuilles rondes. – (Bluebell).

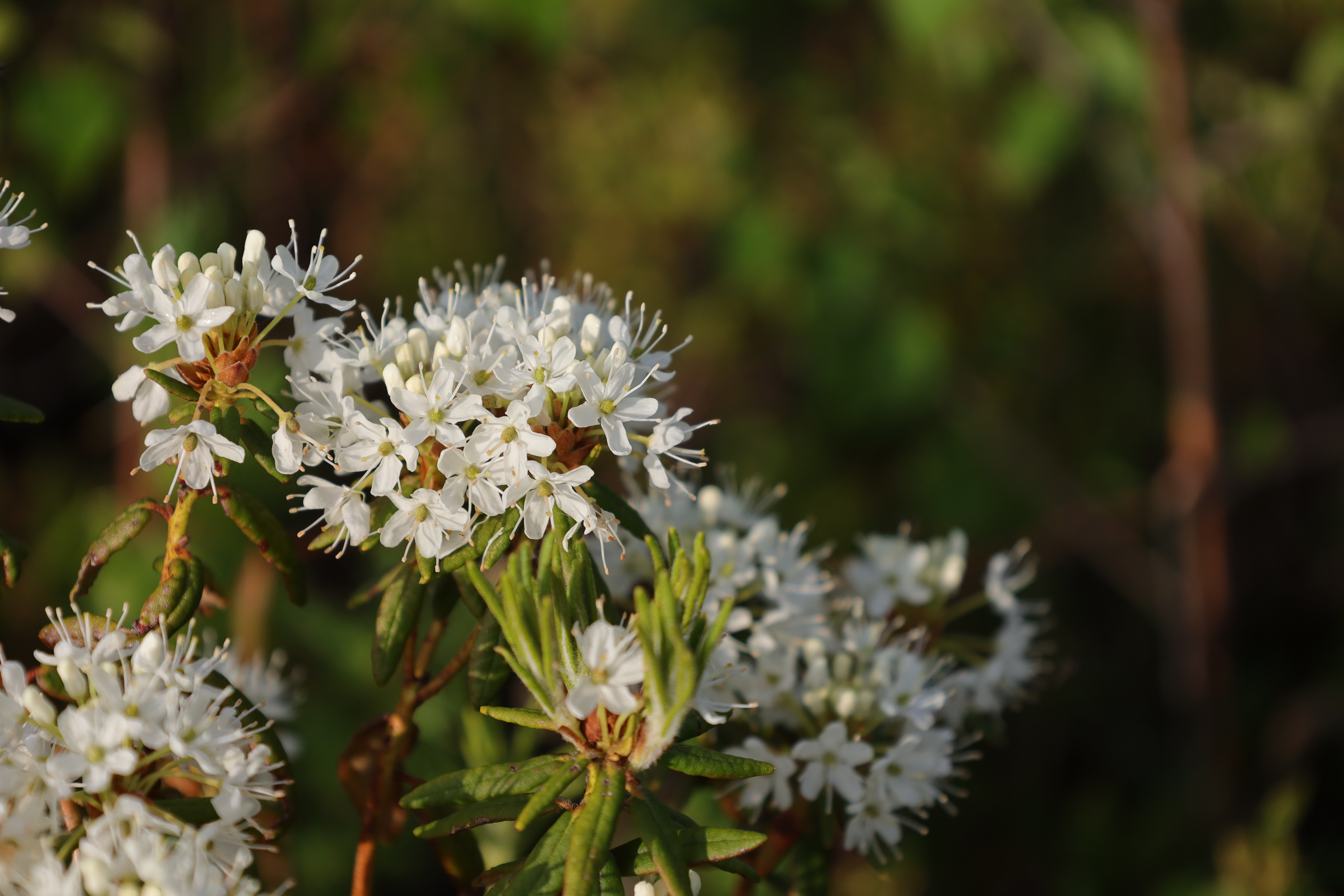
Ledum groenlandicum. — Lédon du Groenland. — Thé du Labrador, Thé velouté. — (Labrador Tea).

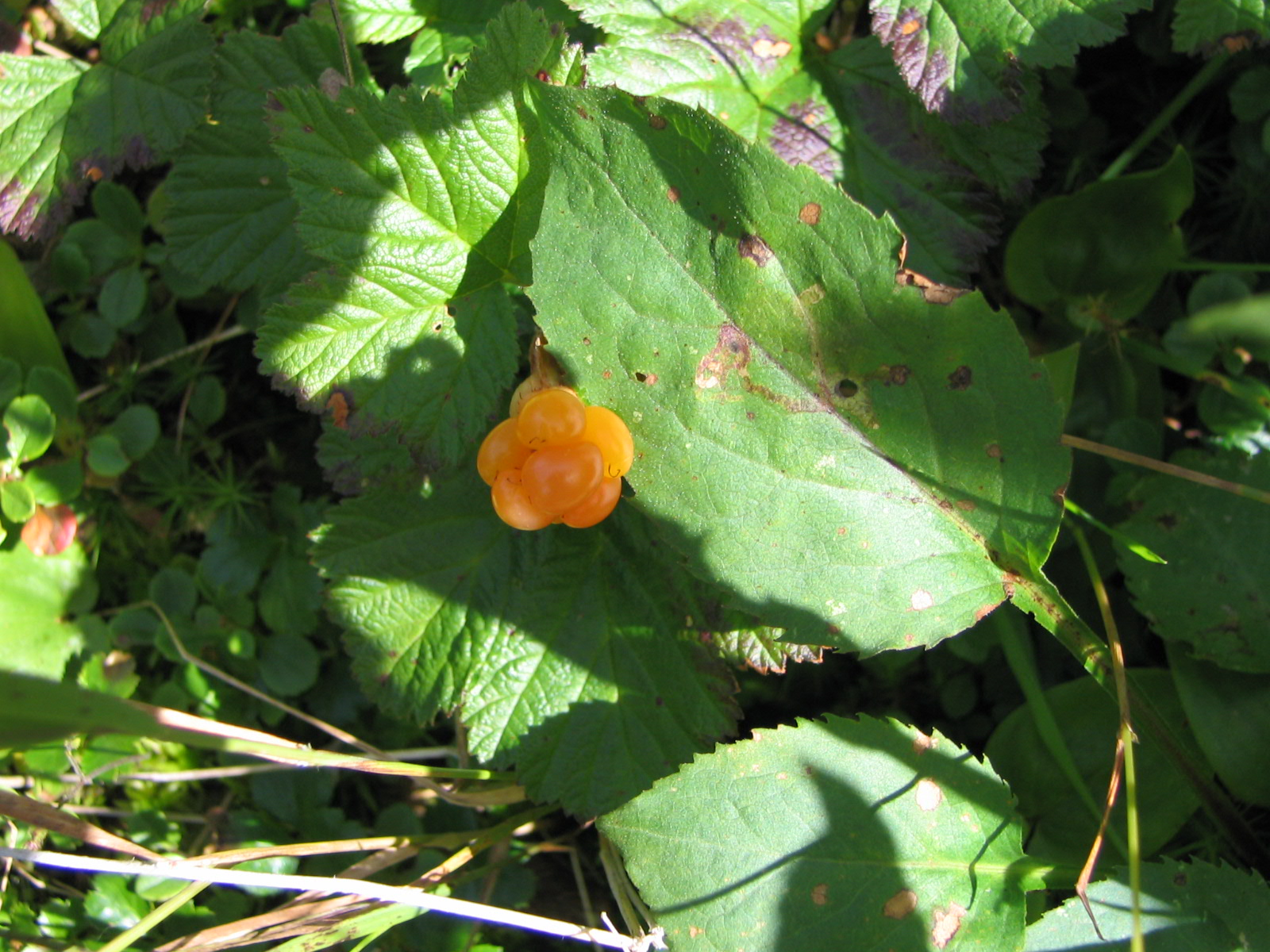
Rubus chamaemorus Linné. — Ronce petit-mûrier. — Mûres blanches, Blackbières, Plaquebières, Chicoutés. — (Cloudberry).

== Fauna ==
The Côte-Nord has abundant and diversified wildlife resources spread throughout the territory. Each year, the Fur Trapping Agency publishes an information bulletin on the fur-bearers of the North Shore. Among the main prey, they are considered common to abundant and generally stable.

- Snowshoe hare
- Red squirrel
- House mouse

Species considered rare in the region.

- Coyote
- Striped skunk
- Fisher
- Raccoon
- Bobcat

=== Small game ===
Most well-known small game is and the Snowshoe hare and Grouse family species

- Ruffed grouse
- Spruce grouse
- Willow ptarmigan

=== Mammals ===
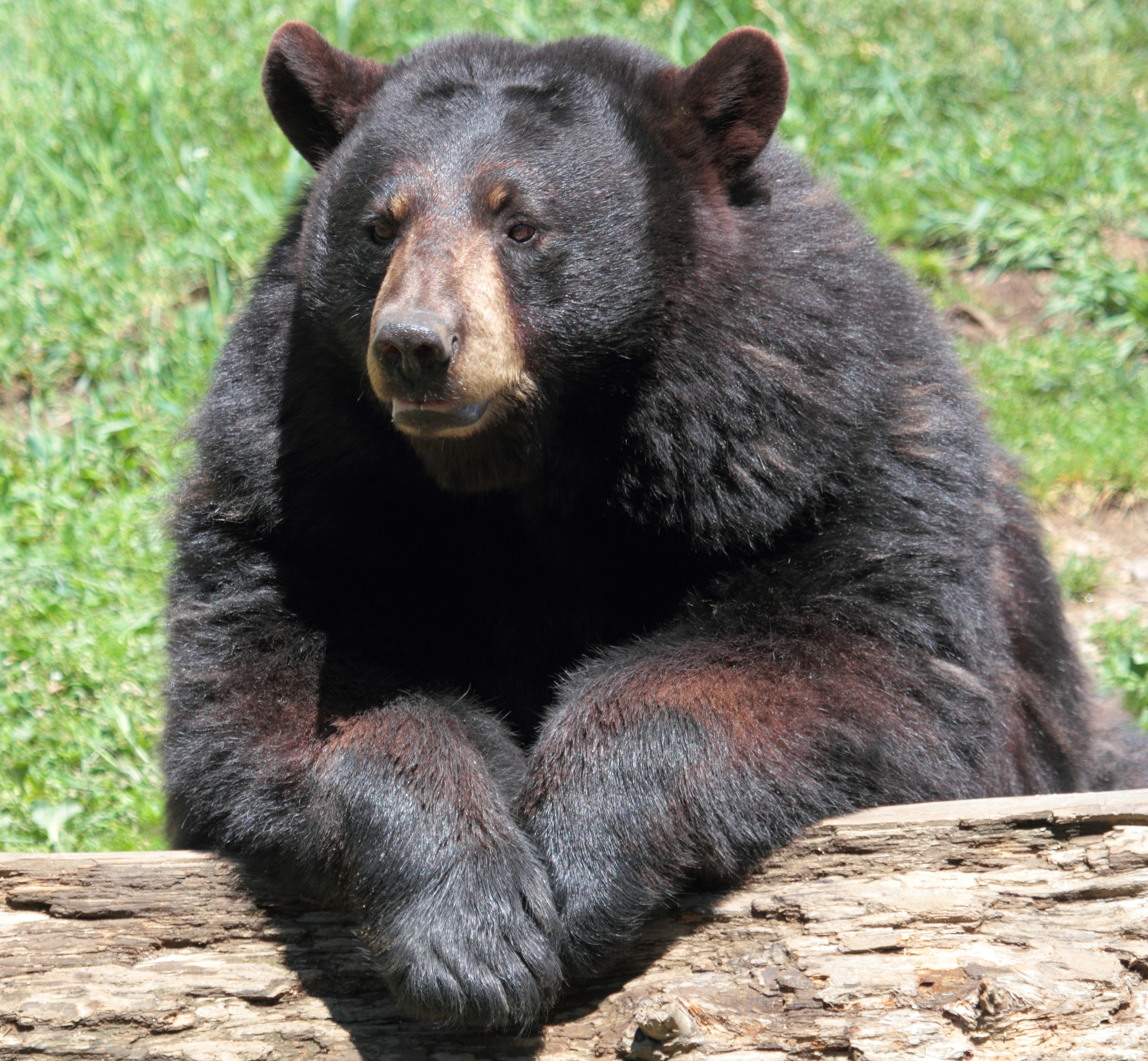
American black bear.

The most well-known species are:

- American marten
- North American beaver
- Muskrat
- American mink
- Red fox
- Grey wolf
- Wolverine
- Canada lynx.

The large fauna includes:

- Migratory woodland caribou
- Eastern moose
- White-tailed deer. Present only on Anticosti Island.
- American black bear. Considered extinct on Anticosti Island.

=== Avifauna ===
An important migratory stopover for birds, the Côte-Nord offers many favourite sites to observe 350 listed species at leisure.

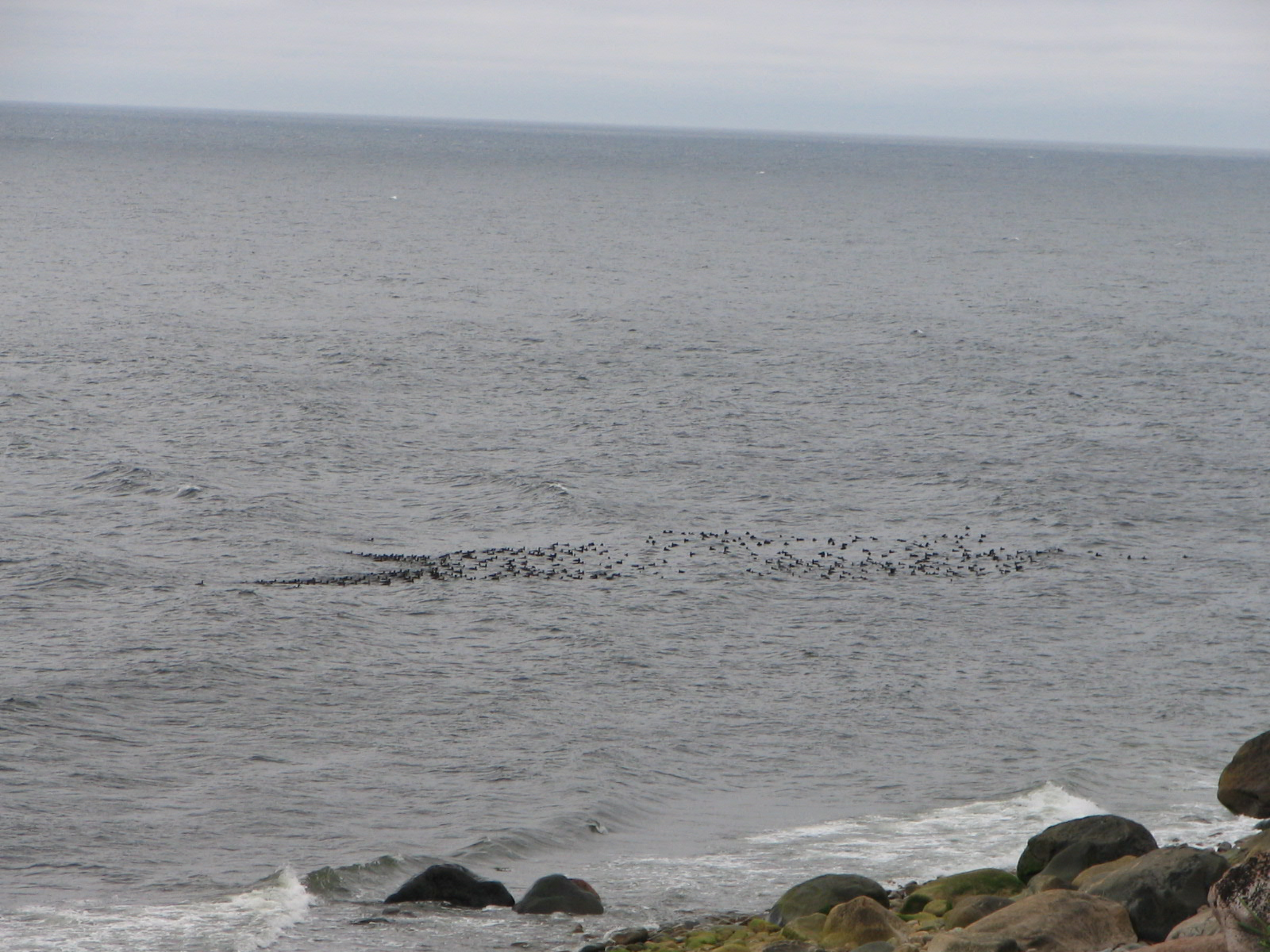
Gulf of St. Lawrence, raft of coastal seabirds a few metres from the mouth of the Sault Plat River

The diversity of habitats favours the presence of many avian species. According to the Manicouagan Ornithology Club, a wide variety of birds have been observed on the Côte-Nord including:

- Red-throated loon
- Arctic tern
- Atlantic puffin
- Bald eagle is a species at risk or designated threatened or vulnerable.

=== Marine mammals ===
From Tadoussac to Blanc-Sablon, along The Whale Route (Route 138), it is possible to observe marine mammals.

Cetaceans:

- Beluga whale
- Common minke whale
- Fin whale
- Harbour porpoise
- Blue whale.

Seals:

- Grey seal
- Harbor seal
- Harp seal

== Economy ==
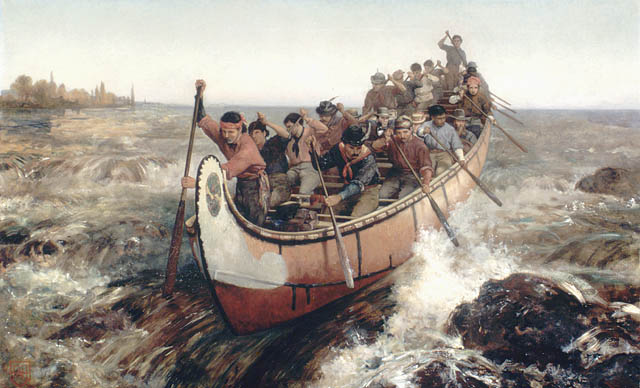
Shooting the Rapids, Quebec, Frances Anne Hopkins (1838–1919)

The hydrography of the Côte-Nord has always been considered over the centuries as a structuring element, whether for exchanges between indigenous nations, for the beginning of colonization, for logging and transport of wood and, more recently, for the development of hydroelectricity and recreational tourism.

Mining, forestry, hydroelectric power, aluminum processing and fishing constitute the main regional economic activities. These activities are confronted with global markets and natural and human upheavals which affect resources such as fires and insect epidemics.

The region has 121 companies that have permits for the exploitation of granite quarries, sand pits, gravel pits and peat bogs. The exploitation of the latter also represents 50% of Quebec production. Considering the presence of numerous peatlands throughout the territory, vast reserves of high quality are still unexploited.

The presence of major contract givers, access to the St. Lawrence Seaway, three major seaports (Baie-Comeau, Port-Cartier and Sept-Îles, as well as cruise ship ports of call), good air and rail transport in a territory with potential for tourist development constitute the main economic assets of the region.

In addition, with 2,400 kilometers of snowmobile trails, the region is appreciated by fans of this winter sport. The rights of way granted on public land to various snowmobile clubs contribute to the development of this form of winter tourism which boosts the local and regional economy.

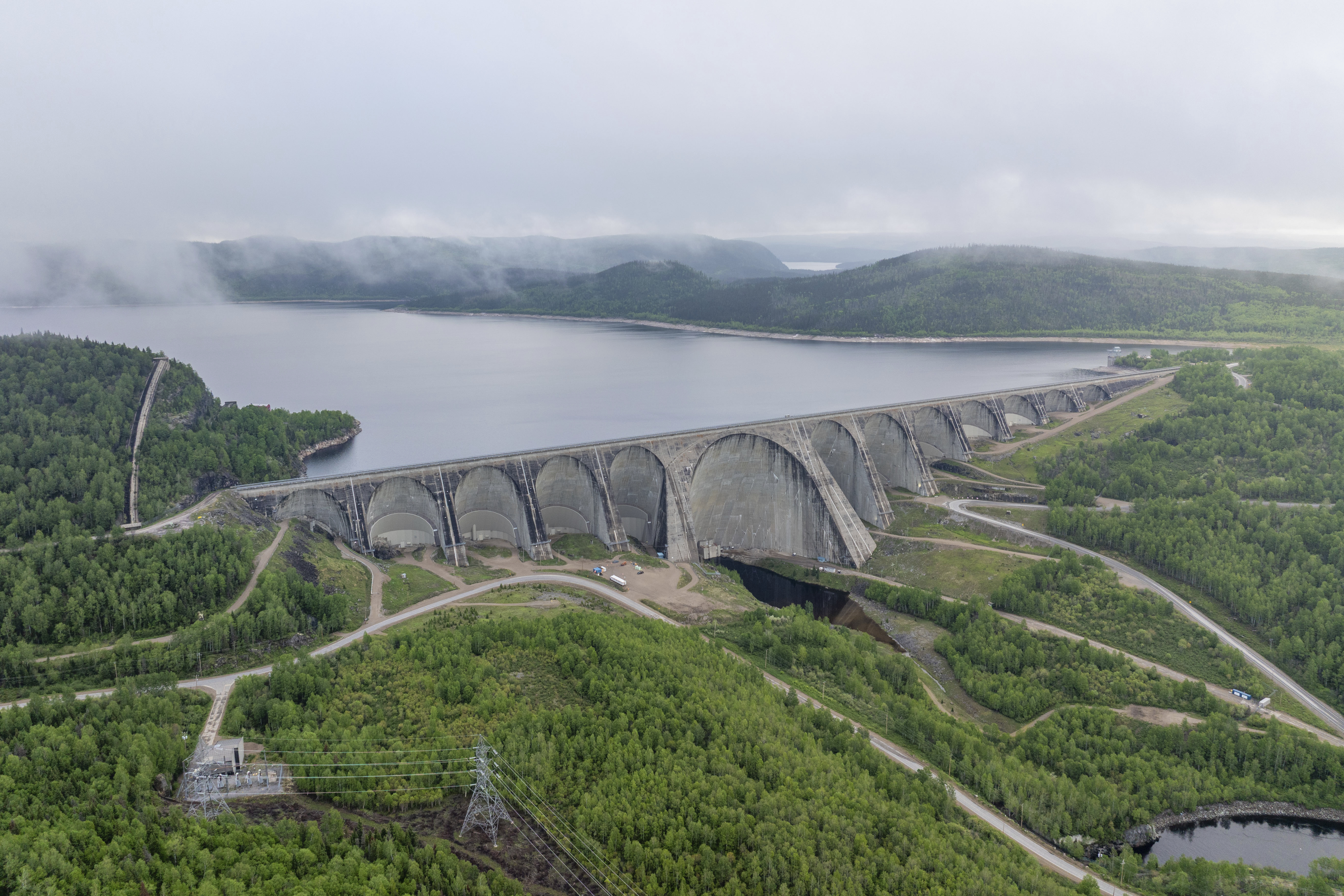
Barrage Daniel-Johnson, a hydroelectric dam on the Manicouagan River

== Administrative divisions ==
=== Regional county municipalities (RCM) ===
- Caniapiscau
- La Haute-Côte-Nord
- Le Golfe-du-Saint-Laurent
- Manicouagan
- Minganie
- Sept-Rivières

=== Indian reserves ===
- Essipit
- La Romaine
- Lac-John
- Maliotenam
- Matimekosh
- Mingan
- Nutashkuan
- Pessamit
- Uashat

=== Indian settlement ===
- Pakuashipi

=== Naskapi reserved land ===
- Kawawachikamach

== Population ==
Between Sept-Îles and Natashquan, people arrive by sea, settle in complete freedom, without fees, depending on the salmon fishing at the mouths of the rivers, the banks of cod offshore, the trapping of fur-bearing animals in some cases and hunting seals other times.

At the 2021 Canadian Census, the population amounted to 88,525, approximately 1.0% of the province's population, spread across 33 municipalities, various Indian reserves and a Naskapi reserved land. The towns of Baie-Comeau and Sept-Îles combined amount to a little more than half of the population of the region.

=== Demographics ===
In the 2021 Census of Population conducted by Statistics Canada, the Côte-Nord region had a population of 88,525 living in 39,798 of its 45,263 total private dwellings, a change of -4.3% from its 2016 population of 92,518, making it the fastest-decreasing region of Québec. With a land area of 234,442.27 km^{2} (90,518.67 sq mi), it had a population density of 0.4/km^{2} (1.0/sq mi) in 2021.

The median age is 46.4, as opposed to 41.6 for all of Canada. French was the mother tongue of 84.9% of residents in 2021. The next most common mother tongues were the Cree-Innu languages at 7.8% total, followed by English at 4.5%. 0.6% reported both English and French as their first language. Additionally, there were 0.8% who reported both French and a non-official language as their mother tongue, mostly speakers of Cree-Innu languages.

Speakers of Cree-Innu languages mostly live in Pessamit and Uashat-Maliotenam. English-speakers mostly live in Le Golfe-du-Saint-Laurent Regional County Municipality.

As of 2021, Indigenous peoples comprised 16.2% of the population and visible minorities contributed 1.5%. The largest visible minority groups in Côte-Nord are Black (0.7%), Arab (0.2%), and Latin American (0.2%). The region is home to 280 recent immigrants (i.e. those arriving between 2016 and 2021). 130 of them come from various African countries.

In 2021, 71.3% of the population identified as Catholic, while 19.6% said they had no religious affiliation. Anglicans were the largest religious minority, at 1.9% of the population, while Muslims were the largest non-Christian religious minority, making up 0.4% of the population.

== Major communities ==
Baie-Comeau — Fermont — Forestville — Havre-Saint-Pierre — Port-Cartier — Sept-Îles

== Exploration ==
The Côte-Nord region was gradually explored by French colonists during the centuries with the help of natives. There was a contribution by Henry de Puyjalon (1841–1905), a pioneer in ecology who devoted his life to the exploration of this region.

== See also ==
- Quebec Route 138 (The Whale Route), from Tadoussac to Blanc-Sablon
- Rivière-au-Tonnerre, Village rélais
- Maritime Quebec
