= Uashat =

- Indian reserve
- Location in Côte-Nord region of Quebec.
- Coordinates: 50°13′N 66°24′W
- Country: Canada
- Province: Quebec
- Region: Côte-Nord
- RCM: None
- Constituted: 1906

Government
  - Federal riding: Côte-Nord—Kawawachikamach—Nitassinan
  - Prov. riding: Duplessis

Area
  - Total: 1.20 km^{2} (0.46 sq mi)
  - Land: 2.36 km^{2} (0.91 sq mi)
- There is an apparent contradiction between two authoritative sources

Population (2021)
  - Total: 1,550
  - Density: 657.2/km^{2} (1,702/sq mi)
  - Pop (2016–21): ▼2.6%
  - Dwellings: 522
- Time zone: UTC−5 (EST)
  - Summer (DST): UTC−4 (EDT)

Uashat is an Indian reserve in Quebec, located adjacent to the city of Sept-Îles. Together with Maliotenam some distance away, it forms the Innu community of Uashat-Maliotenam.

Prior to December 24, 1993, it was known as the Indian reserve of "Sept-Îles", sharing the name with the adjacent city.
