= Lac-John =

- Indian reserve
- Location in Côte-Nord region of Quebec.
- Coordinates: 54°48′45″N 66°46′58″W
- Country: Canada
- Province: Quebec
- Region: Côte-Nord
- Regional county: None
- Settled: 1957
- Formed: 1960

Government
  - Chief: Réal McKenzie
  - Federal riding: Côte-Nord—Kawawachikamach—Nitassinan
  - Prov. riding: Duplessis

Area
  - Land: 0.50 km^{2} (0.19 sq mi)

Population (2021)
  - Total: 21
  - Density: 41.6/km^{2} (108/sq mi)
- Time zone: UTC-5 (EST)
  - Summer (DST): UTC-4 (EDT)
- Postal Code: G0G 2T0
- Area codes: 418 and 581

Lac-John (French pronunciation: [lak dʒɔn]) is a First Nations reserve on John Lake in the Côte-Nord region of Quebec, Canada, about 3.5 kilometres (2.2 mi) north-east from the centre of Schefferville. Together with the Matimekosh Reserve, it belongs to the Innu Nation of Matimekush-Lac John. It is geographically within the Caniapiscau Regional County Municipality but administratively not part of it.

The reserve is named after the adjacent John Lake. That name was assigned by the Labrador Mining and Smelting Company, which used it on one of its geological maps a little before 1947.

== History ==
The region was the northern limit of the hunting and trapping grounds of the Innu indigenous people, but they never had resided there permanently. Because of mining development in the early 1950s, the Naskapi from Fort Chimo and a dozen Innu families from Maliotenam arrived at Schefferville to serve as guides for geological exploration work, and help on the railway construction from Sept-Iles.

In 1957, the Schefferville municipal authorities moved the Innu and Naskapi to a site on John Lake, where they lived in poverty without sanitation, electricity, schools, or a medical facility. A year later, the site was surveyed for the creation of a reserve. On June 7, 1960, the Government of Québec transferred 58 acres (23 ha) to the Government of Canada that then formed the Lac-John Reserve. The Innu and Naskapi initially lived in tiny shacks, but by 1962 Indian and Northern Affairs had built 30 houses for them.

Following the creation of the Matimekosh Reserve close to the town's centre in 1968, the municipality of Schefferville tried to annex the Lac-John Reserve. In 1972, most of the families on the Lac-John Reserve moved to Matimekosh, but a group of them decided to stay and new residences were built for them in 1975.

== Demographics ==
Population trend:

- Population in 2021: 21 (2016 to 2021 population change: -36.4%)
- Population in 2016: 33
- Population in 2011: 21
- Population in 2006: 16
- Population in 2001: 23
- Population in 1996: 38

Private dwellings occupied by usual residents: 11 (total dwellings: 12)
