= Innu Takuaikan Uashat Mak Mani-Utenam =

Innu First Nation governing council in Quebec.

Coordinates: 50°13′48″N 66°23′20″W

- Band No. 80
- People: Innu
- Headquarters: Uashat
- Province: Quebec

Land
- Main reserve: Uashat
- Reserve: Maliotenam
- Land area: 7.37 km^{2} (2.85 sq mi)

Population (October 2019)
- On reserve: 3601
- On other land: 59
- Off reserve: 1121
- Total population: 4781

Government
- Chief: Jonathan St-Onge
- Council: Johnny Régis; Karine Fontaine; Norbert Fontaine; Mélodie Jourdain-Michel; Joséphine Pinette; Karine Régis-Pilot

Tribal Council
- Mamuitun Tribal Council

Website
- ITUM.qc.ca

Innu Takuaikan Uashat Mak Mani-Utenam is an Innu First Nations band government in Quebec, Canada. It is based in Sept-Îles in the Côte-Nord region on the North shore of the Saint Lawrence River. It owns two reserves: Maliotenam 27A and Uashat 27 located at both ends of Sept-Îles. It is governed by a band council and is a member of the Mamuitun Tribal Council.

== Population ==
As of 2019, the band has a total registered population of 4,781 members. According to Statistics Canada's 2016 Canadian Census, Uashat had a population of 1,592 up 7.2% from 1,485 found in the 2011 Census. Maliotenam had a population of 1,542 in 2016, up 17.2% from 1,316 in 2011.

== Politics ==
The Nation is governed by a chief and band council of six members. For the 2019–2022 tenure, the chief of the band council of Uasuat-Maliotenam is Mike (Pelash) McKenzie.

The Innu of Uashat-Maliotenam and those of Matimekosh-Lac-John are represented in land claims negotiations by the Corporation Ashuanipi.

== Languages ==
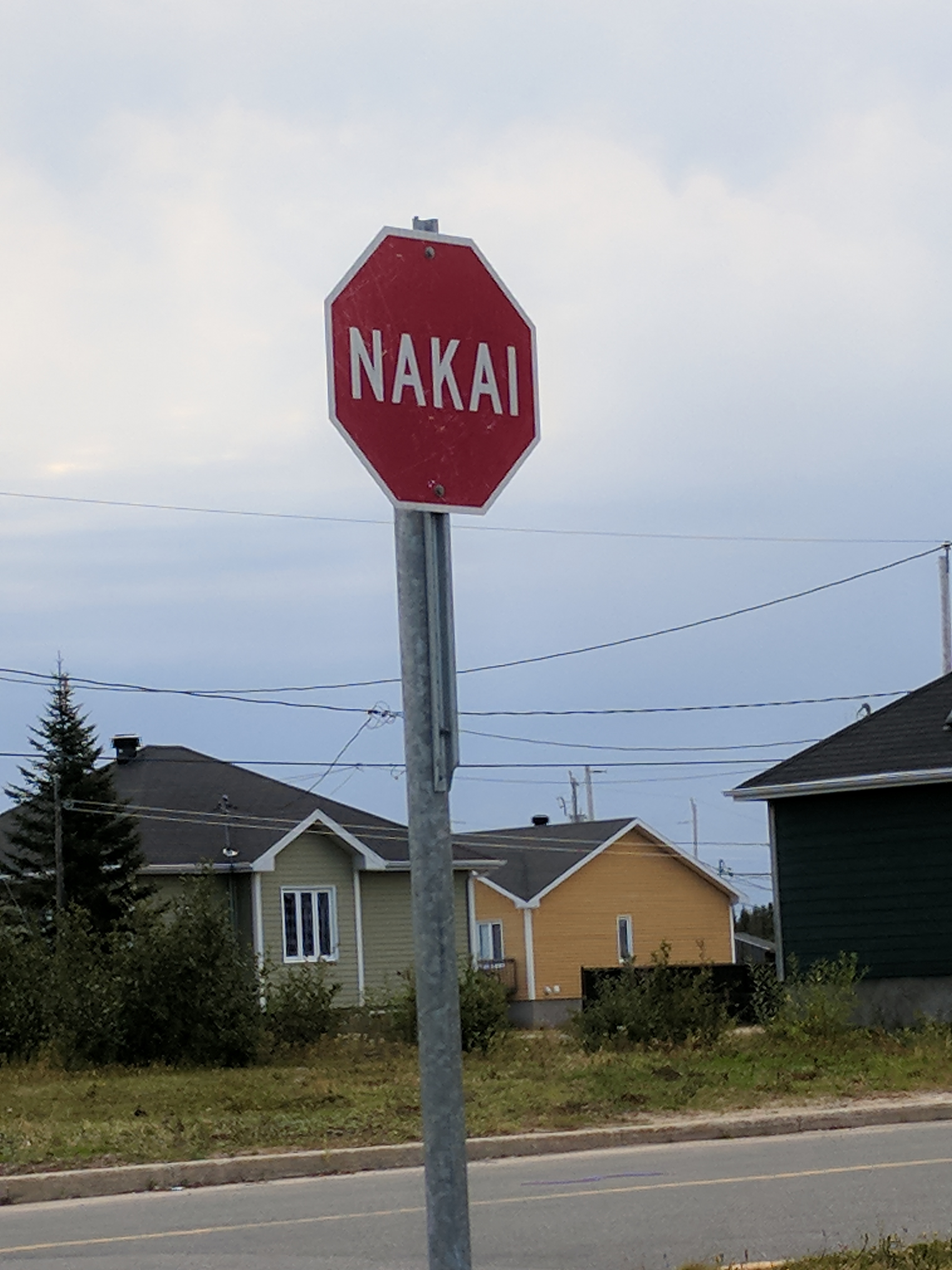
Stop sign in Maliotenam

The language of the Innu people is Innu-aimun. According to the 2016 Canadian Census, on a total population of 3,125, 85.9% know an indigenous language. More precisely, 79.0% have an indigenous language still spoken and understood as a first language and 82.4% speak an indigenous language at home. For official languages, 9.9% know both, 87.8% know only French, 0.5% know only English and 1.8% don't know any.

== Notable people ==
Notable people from the community include:

- Michèle Audette, former president of the Native Women's Association of Canada
- Florent Vollant and Claude McKenzie of musical group Kashtin
- Naomi Fontaine, novelist
- Jonathan Genest-Jourdain, former federal Member of Parliament for Manicouagan
