= Naskapi =

Ethnic group of Quebec and Labrador, Canada

Naskapi (ᓇᔅᑲᐱ)
Total population
- 1,080 (2016 census)

Regions with significant populations
- Canada (Quebec and Newfoundland and Labrador)

Languages
- Naskapi, English, French

Religion
- Christianity, other

Related ethnic groups
- Innu, Cree

- People: Naskapi Iyuw ᓇᔅᑲᐱ ᐃᔪᐤ
- Language: Naskapi Iyuw Iyimuun ᓇᔅᑲᐱ ᐃᔪᐤ ᐃᔨᒧᐅᓐ
- Country: St'aschinuw ᒋᑦ ᐊᔅᒋᓄᐤ

The Naskapi (Nascapi, Naskapee, Nascapee) are an Indigenous people of the Subarctic native to the historical region St'aschinuw (ᒋᑦ ᐊᔅᒋᓄᐤ, meaning 'our [inclusive] land'), which was located in present day northern Quebec, neighbouring Nunavik. They are closely related to Innu people, who call their homeland Nitassinan.

Innu people are frequently divided into two groups, the Neenoilno (called Montagnais by French people) who live along the Quebec north shore of the Gulf of Saint Lawrence, and the less numerous Naskapi who live farther north near Nunavik. The Innu themselves recognize several distinctions (e.g. Mushuau Innuat, Maskuanu Innut, Uashau Innuat) based on different regional affiliations and various dialects of the Innu language.

The word "Naskapi" (meaning "people beyond the horizon") first made an appearance in the 17th century, as Innu began moving into Labrador to trade with European explorers and traders and it was subsequently applied to Innu groups beyond the reach of missionary influence, most notably those living in the lands which bordered Ungava Bay and inland area between Hudson's Bay and the Torngat Mountain range. The Naskapi are traditionally nomadic peoples, in contrast with the territorial Montagnais. Mushuau Innuat (plural), the Naskapi who were then spending more time in Labrador, split off from the tribe in the 20th century and settled on the Labrador coast between Inuit communities at Davis Inlet. In the 1990's, due to the challenges with that community location, the government of Canada assisted in relocating the community to Shango Bay, now called Natuashish. The Naskapi language and culture is quite different from the Montagnais, in which the dialect changes from y to n as in "Iiyuu" versus "Innu". Some of the families of Naskapi Nation of Kawawachikamach have close relatives in the Cree village of Whapmagoostui, on the eastern shore of Hudson Bay.

== History ==
=== Post-European contact ===
"Nascaupee" native American by Frank Weston Benson (1921)

The earliest written reference to Naskapi appears around 1643, when the Jesuit André Richard referred to the "Ounackkapiouek", but little is known about the group to which Richard was referring, other than that they were one of many "small nations" situated somewhere north of Tadoussac. The word "Naskapi" appeared for the first time in 1733, at which time the group so described was said to number approximately forty families and to have an important camp at Ashuanipi Lake. At approximately the same time, in 1740, Joseph Isbister, the manager of the Hudson's Bay Company's post at Eastmain, reported being told that there were Indians, whom he called "Annes-carps" to the northeast of Richmond Gulf. In later years those Indians came to be called variously "Nascopie" and "Nascappe". Not many years later, in 1790, the Periodical Accounts of the Moravian Missionaries described a group of Indians living west of Okak as "Nascopies". The Naskapi came under the influence of Protestant missionaries, and remain Protestant to this day. In addition to their native tongue, they speak English, in contrast to their Montagnais cousins who are for the most part Roman Catholic, speaking the native language and French. The Montagnais are far more numerous than the Naskapi.

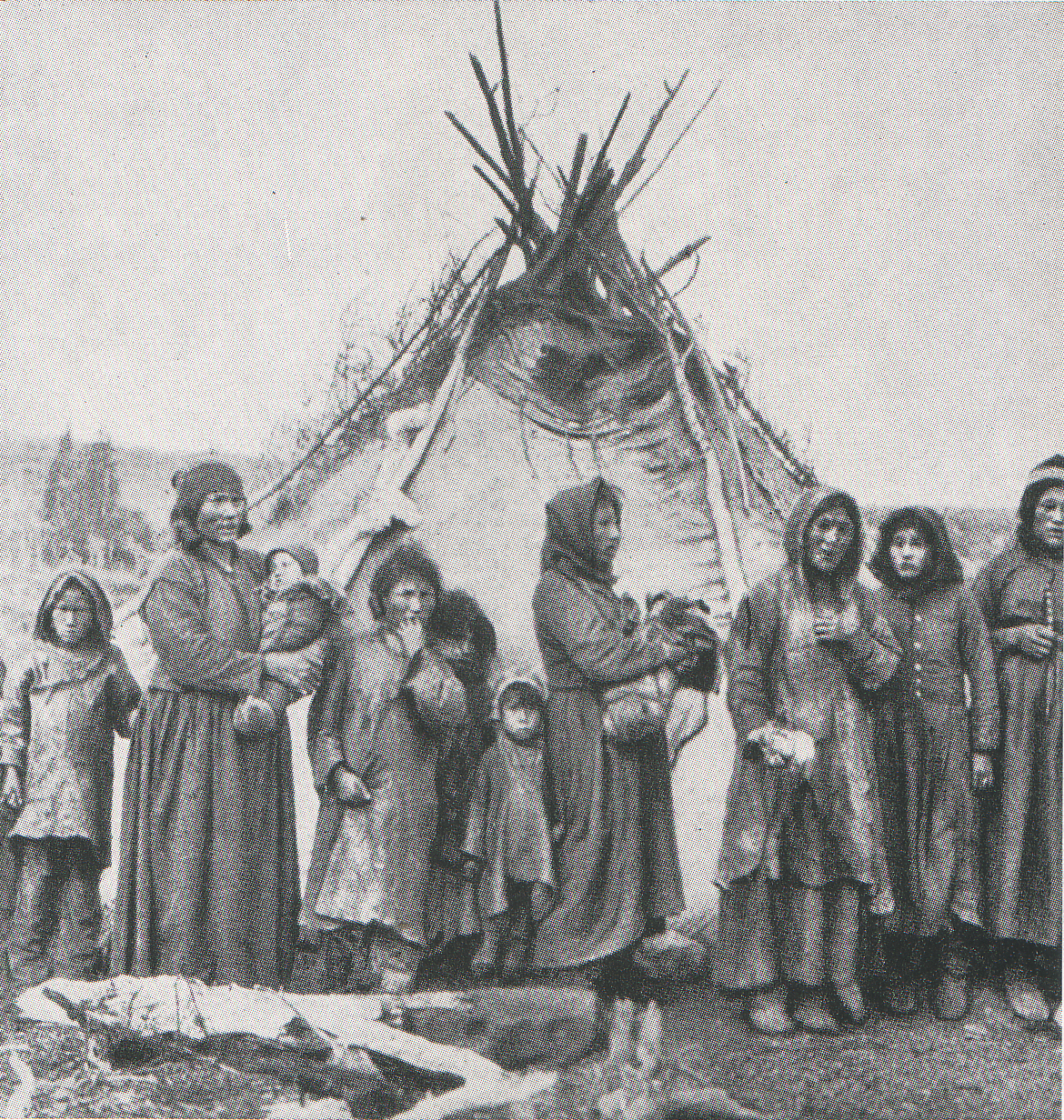
Naskapi women, wearing woolen and deerskin clothing, 1908

The years 1831 onwards were characterized by the first regular contacts between the Naskapi and western society, when the Hudson's Bay Company established its first trading post at Old Fort Chimo.

The relationship between the Naskapi and the Hudson's Bay Company was not an easy one. It was difficult for the Naskapi to integrate commercial trapping, especially of marten in Winter, into their seasonal round of subsistence activities, for the simple reason that the distribution of marten was in large measure different from the distribution of essential sources of food at that season. In consequence, the Naskapi did not prove to be the regular and diligent trappers that the traders must have hoped to find, and the traders seem to have attributed this fact to laziness or intransigence on the part of Naskapi.

In the 1945 census (in the Dominion of Newfoundland) the total Innu population in Labrador (consisting of both Montagnais and Naskapi) was 100 in Davis Inlet, 33 in Nain and 137 in North West River/Sheshatshiu (270 in total, it has since increased to over 2,000). The previous census in 1935 only counted Innu in Davis Inlet. Some surnames listed in the census including Rich, Michimagaua, Mishimapu and Pokue. Most Innu in Labrador did not have surnames until after confederation in 1949. None of the Innu lived in modern houses but instead camped in tents near North West River, Nain and Davis Inlet (all Inuit settlements) during the summer.

After a 1948 visit to Fort Chimo to measure local duck populations, a Canadian biologist reported that the Naskapi at that location:

...are very few in number and spend the summer at the posts on the Atlantic coast, at Fort McKenzie on the Caniapiscau River, or at Fort Chimo where that river changes its name to the Eskimo word 'Kohsoak'. The Fort Chimo band numbered only about 25 tents at the time of our visit in 1948. The men spend their time lying around the post, and the women and children pick berries on the barrens within a three-mile radius. As the vicinity of Fort Chimo is not duck nesting habitat, they do no damage to waterfowl.

— Bruce S. Wright, "The Forest Duck", High Tide and an East Wind: The Story of the Black Duck (1954)

=== Relocations ===
Between 1831 and 1956, the Naskapi were subjected to several major relocations, all of which reflected not their needs nor interests, but those of the Hudson's Bay Company. The major moves were:

- 1842 – Fort Chimo to Fort Nascopie
- 1870 – Fort Nascopie to Fort Chimo
- 1915 – Fort Chimo to Fort McKenzie
- 1948 – Fort McKenzie to Fort Chimo
- 1956 – Fort Chimo to Schefferville

Numerous cases have been documented in which the Hudson's Bay Company relocated the Naskapi from post to post purely for its own commercial purposes, and without any concern as to whether the areas where the posts were situated offered the Naskapi the possibility of harvesting the fish and game that they required for food as well as the fur-bearers that the Company sought. In several instances, individual managers, apparently dissatisfied with the Naskapi' seeming lack of commitment to trapping withheld from them the ammunition that they needed to hunt for food, thereby directly causing a considerable number of deaths from starvation.

=== 20th century ===
By the late 1940s, the pressures of the fur trade, high rates of mortality and debilitation from diseases communicated by Europeans, and the effects of the virtual disappearance of the George River Caribou Herd had reduced the Naskapi to a state where their very survival was threatened.

The Naskapi had received relief from the Federal Government as early as the end of the 19th century, but their first regular contacts with the Federal Government began only in 1949, when Colonel H.M. Jones, Superintendent of Welfare Services in Ottawa, and M. Larivière of the Abitibi Indian Agency visited them in Fort Chimo and arranged for the issuing of welfare to them.

In the early 1950s, the Naskapi made a partially successful effort to re-establish themselves at Fort McKenzie, where they had already lived between 1916 and 1948, and to return to an economy based substantially on hunting, fishing and commercial trapping. They could no longer be entirely self-sufficient, however, and the high cost of resupplying them, combined with the continuing high incidence of tuberculosis and other factors, obliged them to return to Fort Chimo after only two years.

==== Move to Schefferville ====
For reasons that are not entirely clear, virtually all of the Naskapi moved from Fort Chimo to the recently founded iron-ore mining community of Schefferville in 1956. Two principal schools of thought about this move exist. One of them holds that the Naskapi were induced, if not ordered, to move by officials of Indian and Northern Affairs, while the other believes that the Naskapi themselves decided to move in the hope of finding employment, housing, medical assistance, and educational facilities for their children.

Although officials of Indian and Northern Affairs were certainly aware of the intention of the Naskapi to move from Fort Chimo to Schefferville and may even have instigated that move, they appear to have done little or nothing to prepare for their arrival there, not even by warning the representatives of the Iron Ore Company of Canada ("IOCC") or the municipality of Schefferville.

The Naskapi left Fort Chimo on foot to make the 400-mile (640 km) journey to Schefferville overland. By the time they reached Wakuach Lake, some 70 miles (113 km) north of Schefferville, most of them were in a pitiable state, exhausted, ill, and close to starvation.

A successful rescue effort was mounted, but the only homes that awaited the Naskapi were the shacks that they built for themselves on the edge of Pearce Lake, near the railroad station, with scavenged and donated materials. A short time later, in 1957, under the pretext that the water at Pearce Lake was contaminated, the municipal authorities moved them to a site adjacent to John Lake, some four miles (6 km) north-north-east of Schefferville, where they lived without benefit of water sewage, or electricity, and where, despite their hopes in coming to Schefferville, there was no school for their children and no medical facility.

The Naskapi shared the site at John Lake with a group of Montagnais, who had moved voluntarily from Sept-Îles to Schefferville with the completion of the railroad in the early 1950s.

Initially, the Naskapi lived in tiny shacks that they built for themselves, but by 1962 Indian and Northern Affairs had built 30 houses for them, and a further four were under construction at a cost of $5,000 each.

==== Move to Matimekosh ====
In 1969, Indian and Northern Affairs acquired from the reluctant Municipality of Schefferville, a marshy, 39-acre (160,000 m^{2}) site north of the town centre and adjacent to Pearce Lake. By 1972, 43 row-housing units had been built there for the Naskapi, and a further 63 for Montagnais, and most of the Naskapi and Montagnais moved to this new site, known today as Matimekosh.

For the first time in their lengthy history of relocations, the Naskapi were consulted in the planning of their new home. Indian and Northern Affairs sent officials to explain the new community to the Naskapi, a brochure was published, models built, and progress reports issued. Particular interest among the Naskapi centred on the type of housing that they would receive. Possibly for financial reasons, Indian and Northern Affairs wanted them to live in row houses, whereas the Naskapi had a strong preference for detached, single-family residences. In the event, Council was persuaded to accept row housing, but it did so only on the condition that the houses were adequately sound-proofed, which turned out not to be the case.

Perhaps because it was the first such process in which they had been involved, the Naskapi placed considerable faith in the consultation undertaken by Indian and Northern Affairs. It is a source of considerable bitterness even today that, in the minds of many Naskapi, not all of the promises or reassurances that were made were lived up to. Two examples are most commonly cited: the insistence of Indian and Northern Affairs' representatives that the Naskapi live in row houses that, in the event, proved not to be adequately soundproofed and that had a variety of other faults; and the fact that the brochure prepared by Indian and Northern Affairs showed a fully landscaped site with trees and bushes, whereas no landscaping was done, and no trees or bushes were ever planted.

Incidents like these, though seen as minor by most, took place during the very early stages of Naskapi and Indian and Northern Affairs relations, and the Naskapi had not forgotten the unfavorable treatment towards them from the Hudson's Bay Company. Thus, these incidents are still spoken about and are matters of discourse even today within the Naskapi.

==== James Bay Agreement ====
A pivotal event in the history of the Naskapi occurred in early 1975, when, after separate visits to Schefferville by Billy Diamond, Grand Chief, Grand Council of the Crees (of Quebec) ("GCCQ"), and Charlie Watt, President, Northern Quebec Inuit Association ("NQIA"), the Naskapi decided to become involved in the negotiations leading to the signature of the James Bay and Northern Quebec Agreement ("JBNQA").

The Naskapi entered into a contract with the NQIA, under which the latter was to provide logistical support, legal advice, and representation to a small team of Naskapi negotiators based in Montreal. That arrangement was not very successful (how?), however, and the JBNQA was signed on 11 November 1975, without the Naskapi.

Shortly before the signing of the JBNQA, realizing that the demands on the Inuit were too great to allow them to represent the interests of the Naskapi in addition to their own interests, the Naskapi negotiators retained their own non-Native advisors and started to function as an independent negotiating body.

The signatories of the JBNQA were fully aware that it provided for the extinguishment of the Naskapi' Aboriginal rights in the Territory without granting them any compensatory rights or benefits. They also knew that the Naskapi, unlike certain others of Quebec's First Nations at that time, were willing to negotiate a settlement of their Aboriginal claims.

Thus, although the Naskapi had never filed a formal statement of claim or similar document, except for a draft history prepared by the late Alan Cooke, the parties to the JBNQA accepted the legitimacy of their claims, and they entered into an agreement-in-principle with the Naskapi in the Spring of 1977 to negotiate an agreement that would have the same principal features as the JBNQA. The result of the negotiations was the Northeastern Quebec Agreement ("NEQA"), which was executed on 31 January 1978.

Section 20 of the NEQA offered the Naskapi the possibility of relocating from the Matimekosh Reserve to a new site.

==== Move to Kawawachikamach ====
Between 1978 and 1980, technical and socio-economic studies of the potential sites for the permanent Naskapi community were carried out. On 31 January 1980, the Naskapi voted overwhelmingly to relocate to the present site of Kawawachikamach, built largely by Naskapi between 1980 and 1983. The planning and building gave Naskapi training and experience in administration and in construction and maintenance trades.

Between 1981 and 1984, the self-government legislation promised by Canada in Section 7 of the NEQA was negotiated. The outcome of those negotiations was the Cree-Naskapi (of Quebec) Act ("CNQA"), which was assented to by Parliament on 14 June 1984.

The overriding purpose of the CNQA was to make the NNK and the James Bay Cree Bands largely self-governing. In addition to the powers then exercised by band councils under the Indian Act, most of the powers that had until then been exercised by the Minister of the Department of Indian Affairs and Northern Development ("DIAND") under the Indian Act were transferred to the NNK and to the James Bay Cree bands, to be exercised by their elected councils. The NNK and the James Bay Cree bands were also given powers not found in the Indian Act, powers normally exercised by non-Native municipalities throughout Canada.

The NEQA had been negotiated under the assumption that Schefferville would continue to be an active centre of mining, outfitting, and exploration for the foreseeable future. Inquiries by the Government of Quebec to the Iron Ore Company of Canada ("IOCC") in the late 1970s had confirmed that assumption. Nevertheless, IOCC announced in 1982 its intention to close the mines at Schefferville immediately.

The closing of the mines at Schefferville had profound implications for the implementation of the NEQA, particularly for those provisions dealing with health and social services and with training and job-creation. Consequently, in the late 1980s, the NNK and the Government of Canada undertook a joint evaluation of Canada's discharging of its responsibilities under the NEQA. The evaluation was motivated more by the change in the circumstances of Schefferville and of the Naskapi than by any belief on the part of the Naskapi that Canada had wilfully neglected any of its responsibilities under the NEQA.

==== Northeastern Quebec Agreement ====
The outcome of those negotiations was the Agreement Respecting the Implementation of the Northeastern Quebec Agreement ("ARINEQA"), which was executed in September 1990. Among other things, the ARINEQA established the model for funding capital and O&M expenditures over five-year periods, created a Dispute Resolution Mechanism for disputes arising from the interpretation, administration, and implementation of the NEQA, the JBNQA, and the ARINEQA, and created a working group to address employment for Naskapi.

== Economic and community development ==
The Naskapi are now developing their homeland, notably through economic development and community reinforcement.

Economic Development Projects:

- Schefferville Airport Corporation - Runway Maintenance (with Naskapi Development Corp./Montagnais of Matimekosh/Lac John )
- James Bay TransTaiga Road Maintenance (with Naskapi Adoshouana Services/NDC subsidiary)
- Naskapi Typonomy Project (with Naskapi Adoshouana Services/NDC subsidiary)
- Menihek Power Dam and Facilities (with Kawawachikamach Energy Services Inc.)
- Enterprise, Resource, Planning, and Management Software (Naskapi Imuun Inc. (Naskapi Nation))

Sectors of Activity currently being developed:

- Commercialization of Caribou (Naskapi Caribou Meat Company/Nunavik Arctic Foods)
- Caribou Hunting and Fishing Operations (TUKTU- Hunting/Fishing Club/Naskapi Management Serv.)

== Religion ==
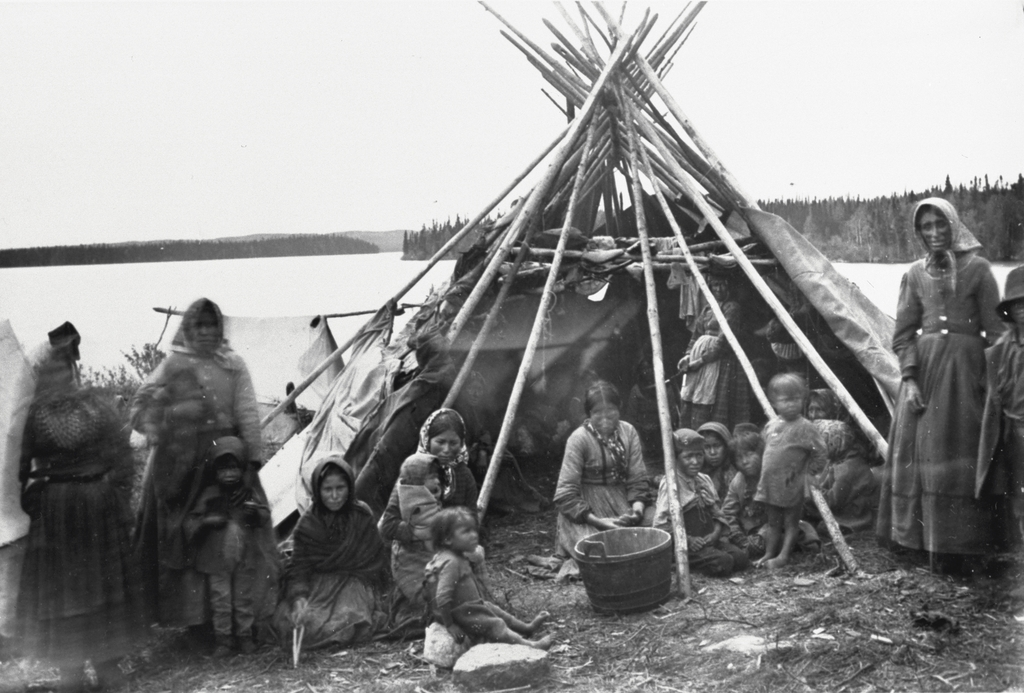
Naskapi scapulimancy

Due to their geographic isolation, the Naskapi were initially less affected by missionaries than other groups. One primary spiritual influence was "Moose-Fly" (Məsəna´kʷ), a spirit often accompanied by actual moose-flies, who would sting people during salmon-fishing season in the summer. Humans had to obey the Moose-Fly spirit's commands, including a taboo around making fun of fish for having extra-large eyes. Salmon was a vital resource for the Naskapi, so the Moose-Fly's commands carried great weight.

== Naskapi First Nations ==
=== Naskapi Nation of Kawawachikamach ===
Naskapi Nation of Kawawachikamach (the "Nation"), originally known as the "Naskapis de Schefferville Indian Band" and later as the "Naskapi Band of Quebec", is a First Nation in with a population of approximately 850 registered First Nations people, who are also beneficiaries of the Northeastern Quebec Agreement ("NEQA"). The majority reside in Kawawachikamach, Quebec, located approximately 16 kilometres (10 mi) northeast of Schefferville. The village covers an area of approximately 40 acres (16 ha) and is situated on 16 square miles (41 km^{2}) of Category IA-N land. There is ample room for expansion, whether for residential, commercial, or industrial purposes.

The vast majority of the residents of Kawawachikamach are Naskapi. Naskapi is their principal language. It is spoken by all of them and written by many. English is their second language, although many younger persons also speak some French. The Naskapi still preserve many aspects of their traditional way of life and culture. Like many northern communities, the Naskapi rely on subsistence hunting, fishing, and trapping for a large part of their food supply and for many raw materials. Harvesting is at the heart of Naskapi spirituality.

Kawawachikamach is linked to Schefferville by a gravel-surfaced all-season road. Rail transportation is available on a weekly basis between Schefferville, Wabush and Labrador City, and Sept-Îles. The train is equipped to transport passengers and freight, including large vehicles, gasoline and fuel oil, and refrigerated goods. Schefferville, which has a 5,000-foot (1,500 m) paved landing strip, is connected to points south by means of year-round, five-day-per-week service.

=== Mushuau Innu First Nation ===
Mushuau Innu First Nation is located in the Canadian province of Newfoundland and Labrador. In 1967 the Mushuau Innu were settled in Utshimassits (Davis Inlet) on Iluikoyak Island located off the coast of Labrador Peninsula, which inhibited the ability of the Mushuau Innu to continue their traditional caribou hunt on the mainland. Therefore, they were relocated in the winter of 2002/2003 to their new main settlement Natuashish (pronounced: 'Nat-wah-sheesh'), about 295 km north of Happy Valley-Goose Bay and 80 km southeast of Nain. Natuashish located on the mainland is only 15 km west of Utshimassits; ethnically they are Naskapi, speaking the Eastern Dialect (Mushuau Innu or Davis Inlet variety) of Iyuw Imuun and writing in Eastern Cree syllabics, but split up and sent to Eastern Labrador, very few (if any) are able to write in syllabics any more. The majority of the people are Catholic, which use the Montagnais Bible (which does not use syllabics) and therefore use the Latin alphabet, Reservation: Natuashish #2, ca. 44 km², Population: 936)

== Past name spelling variations ==
- Es-ko-piks—Walch, Charte von America. (Augsburg, 1805).
- Nascapee—Hodges, Handbook of American Indians North of Mexico, 2:30. (Washington, 1910).
- Nascopi—Stearns, Labrador: a sketch of its people, its industries and its natural history, 262. (Boston, 1884).
- Nascopie—McLean, Notes of a twenty-five years' service in the Hudson's Bay territory, 2:53. (London, 1849).
- Nascupi—Stearns, Labrador: a sketch of its people, its industries and its natural history, 262. (Boston, 1884).
- Naskapis—Hocquart (1733) quoted by Hind, Explorations in the interior of the Labrador peninsula, the country of the Montagnais and Nasquapee Indians, 2. (London, 1863).
- Naskapit—Kingsley, The Standard Natural History, 6:149. (Boston, 1885).
- Naskopie—Turner in 11th Report, Bureau of American Ethnology, 183. (Washington, 1894).
- Naskopis—Kingsley, The Standard Natural History, 6:149. (Boston, 1885).
- Naskupis—Hocquart (1733) quoted by Hind, Explorations in the interior of the Labrador peninsula, the country of the Montagnais and Nasquapee Indians, 2:96. (London, 1863).
- Nasquapees—Stearns, Labrador: a sketch of its people, its industries and its natural history, 262. (Boston, 1884).
  - Naspapees—Stearns, Labrador: a sketch of its people, its industries and its natural history, 262. (Boston, 1884).
- Nasquapicks—Cartwright (1774), quoted by Hind, Explorations in the interior of the Labrador peninsula, the country of the Montagnais and Nasquapee Indians, 2:101. (London, 1863).
- Ne né not—Turner in 11th Report, Bureau of American Ethnology, 183. (Washington, 1894).
- Neskaupe—Kingsley, The Standard Natural History, 6:148. (Boston, 1885).
- Ounachkapiouek—Jesuit Relations for 1643, 38. (Québec, 1858).
- Ounadcapis—Stearns, Labrador: a sketch of its people, its industries and its natural history, 262, (Boston, 1884).
- Ounascapis—Hind, Explorations in the interior of the Labrador peninsula, the country of the Montagnais and Nasquapee Indians, 1:275. (London, 1863).
- Ounescapi—Bellin, Partie orientale de la Nouvelle France ou de Canada. (1855).
  - Cuneskapi—Laure (1731) quoted by Hind, Explorations in the interior of the Labrador peninsula, the country of the Montagnais and Nasquapee Indians, 1:34 (London, 1863)
- Scoffies—Gallatin in Transactions of the American Philosophical Society, 2:103 (1848)
- Secoffee—Brinton, Library of aboriginal American literature: The Lenâpé and their legends., 5:11 (Philadelphia, 1885)
- Shoüdamunk—Gatschet in Transactions of the American Philosophical Society, 409. (Philadelphia, 1855). From the Beothuk language, "Good Indians".
- Skoffie—writer c. 1799 in Massachusetts Historical Society Collection (First series), 6:16. (Boston, 1800).
- Unescapis—La Tour, [Carte de] L'Amérique Septentoinale, ou se remarquent les États Unis. (Paris, 1779).
- Ungava Indians—McLean, Notes of a twenty-five years' service in the Hudson's Bay territory, 2:53. (London, 1849).
