= Schefferville Airport =

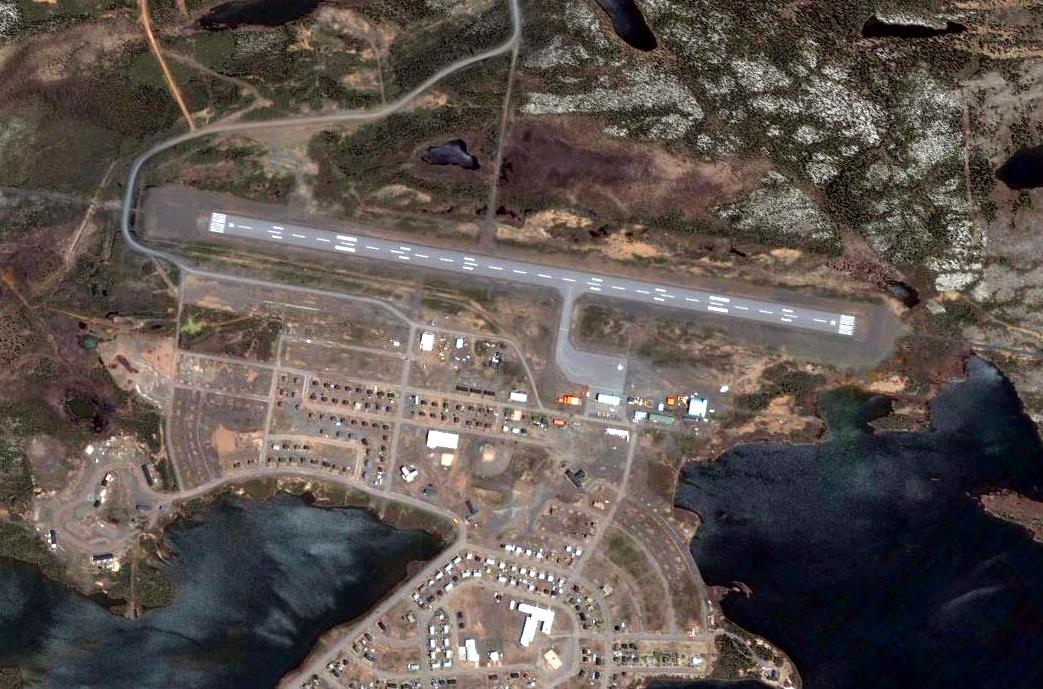
- IATA: YKL; ICAO: CYKL; WMO: 71828

Summary
- Airport type: Public
- Operator: Société aéroportuaire de Schefferville
- Location: Schefferville, Quebec
- Time zone: EST (UTC−05:00)
  - Summer (DST): EDT (UTC−04:00)
- Elevation AMSL: 1,709 ft (521 m)
- Coordinates: 54°48′19″N 066°48′19″W

Map
- Location in Quebec

Runways
Direction	Length		Surface
Direction	ft	m	Surface
17/35	5,002	1,525	Asphalt
- Source: Canada Flight Supplement, Environment Canada

Schefferville Airport (IATA: YKL, ICAO: CYKL) is located adjacent to the community of Schefferville, Quebec, Canada.

== Airlines and destinations ==
As of September 2026, the airport serves the following airlines and destinations:

Airlines	Destinations
Air Inuit	Montréal–Trudeau, Québec City, Sept-Îles

== See also ==
- Schefferville/Squaw Lake Water Aerodrome
