= List of cities in Canada =

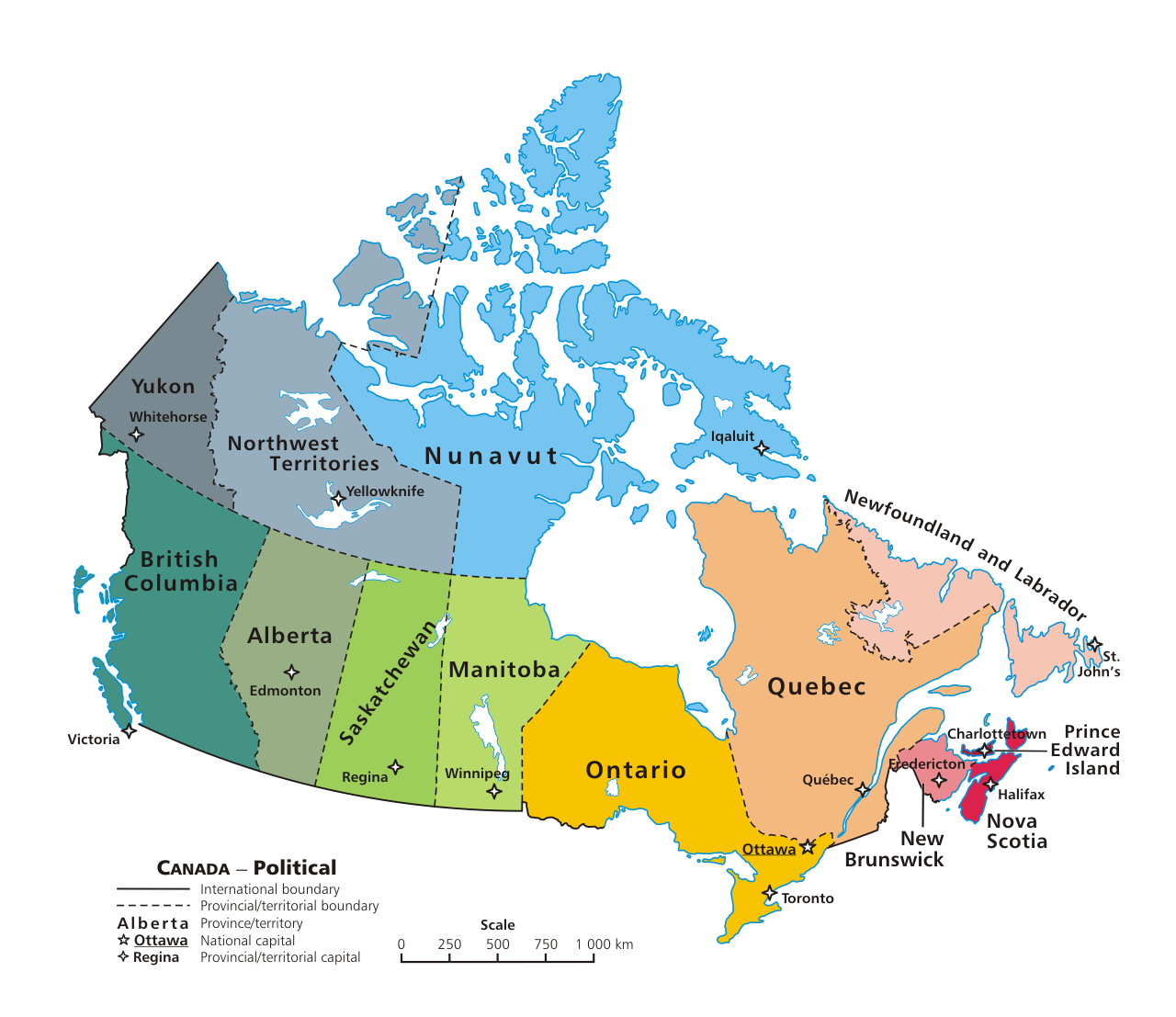
Communities by provinces and territories of Canada

This is a list of incorporated cities in Canada, in alphabetical order categorized by province or territory. More thorough lists of communities are available for each province.

== Capital cities ==
Geographic area	Capital
Canada	Ottawa
Alberta	Edmonton
British Columbia	Victoria
Manitoba	Winnipeg
New Brunswick	Fredericton
Newfoundland and Labrador	St. John's
Nova Scotia	Halifax
Ontario	Toronto
Prince Edward Island	Charlottetown
Quebec	Quebec City
Saskatchewan	Regina
Northwest Territories	Yellowknife
Nunavut	Iqaluit
Yukon	Whitehorse

== Alberta ==
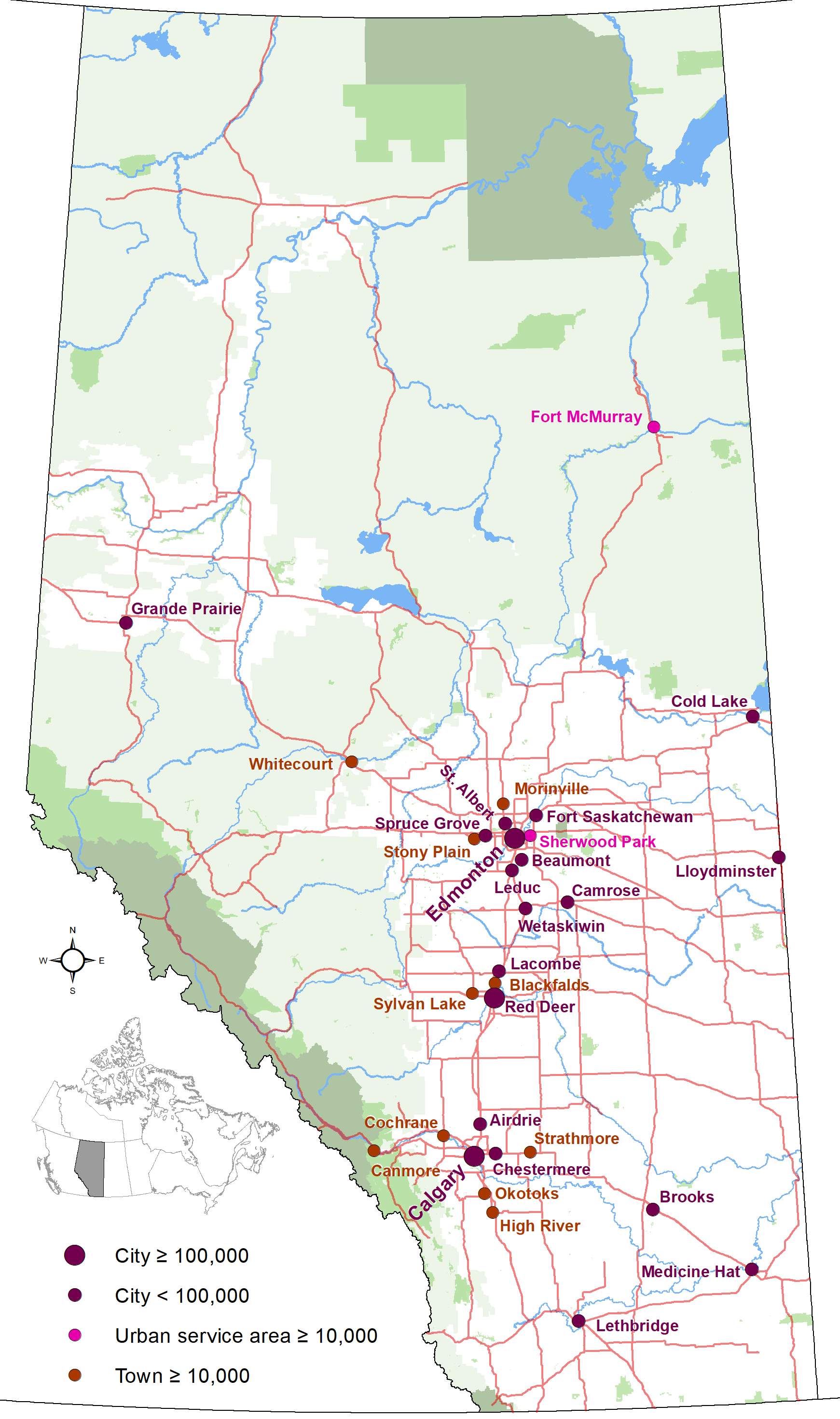
Distribution of Alberta's 19 cities and 12 other communities eligible for city status

To qualify as a city in Alberta, a sufficient population size (10,000 people or more) must be present and a majority of the buildings must be on parcels of land less than 1,850 square metres (19,900 sq ft). A community is not always incorporated as a city even if it meets these requirements. The urban service areas of Fort McMurray and Sherwood Park are hamlets recognized as equivalents of cities, but remain unincorporated. Ten towns are also eligible for city status but remain incorporated as towns.

Alberta has 19 cities. Beaumont is Alberta's newest city, incorporating from town status on January 1, 2019.

List of cities in Alberta
Name	Region	Incorporation date (city)	Council size	2021 Census of Population				
Name	Region	Incorporation date (city)	Council size	Population (2021)	Population (2016)	Change	Land area (km^{2})	Population density (per km^{2})
Airdrie	Calgary Metro	January 1, 1985	7	74,100	61,581	+20.3%	84.39	878.1
Beaumont (Note: Beaumont is Alberta's newest city, incorporated on January 1, 2019.)	Edmonton Metro	January 1, 2019	7	20,888	17,457	+19.7%	24.70	845.7
Brooks (Note: Brooks is Alberta's smallest city by land area.)	Southern	September 1, 2005	7	14,924	14,451	+3.3%	18.21	819.5
Calgary (Note: Calgary is Canada's third-largest city, Alberta's largest city by both population and area, and was Alberta's first city, incorporated on January 1, 1894. The Calgary census metropolitan area (CMA) includes the cities of Airdrie, Calgary and Chestermere.)	Calgary Metro	January 1, 1894	15	1,306,784	1,239,220	+5.5%	820.62	1,592.4
Camrose	Central	January 1, 1955	9	18,772	18,742	+0.2%	41.67	450.5
Chestermere (Note: Chestermere was known as Chestermere Lake prior to March 1, 1993. It is the only city in Alberta to have previously hold summer village status.)	Calgary Metro	January 1, 2015	7	22,163	19,887	+11.4%	32.83	675.1
Cold Lake	Northern	October 1, 2000	7	15,661	14,976	+4.6%	66.61	235.1
Edmonton (Note: Edmonton is Canada's fifth-largest city and Alberta's capital. The Edmonton CMA includes the cities of Beaumont, Edmonton, Fort Saskatchewan, Leduc, Spruce Grove and St. Albert.)	Edmonton Metro	October 8, 1904	13	1,010,899	933,088	+8.3%	765.61	1,320.4
Fort Saskatchewan	Edmonton Metro	July 1, 1985	7	27,088	24,169	+12.1%	56.50	479.4
Grande Prairie	Northern	January 1, 1958	9	64,141	63,166	+1.5%	132.71	483.3
Lacombe	Central	September 5, 2010	7	13,396	13,057	+2.6%	20.59	650.6
Leduc	Edmonton Metro	September 1, 1983	7	34,094	29,993	+13.7%	42.25	807.0
Lethbridge	Southern	May 9, 1906	9	98,406	92,729	+6.1%	121.12	812.5
Lloydminster (part) (Note: The balance of Lloydminster is located within Saskatchewan.)	Central	January 1, 1958	7	19,739	19,645	+0.5%	23.98	823.1
Medicine Hat	Southern	May 9, 1906	9	63,271	63,260	0.0%	111.97	565.1
Red Deer	Central	March 25, 1913	9	100,844	100,418	+0.4%	104.34	966.5
Spruce Grove	Edmonton Metro	March 1, 1986	7	37,645	34,108	+10.4%	37.52	1,003.3
St. Albert	Edmonton Metro	January 1, 1977	7	68,232	65,589	+4.0%	47.84	1,426.3
Wetaskiwin (Note: Wetaskiwin is Alberta's smallest city by population.)	Central	May 9, 1906	7	12,594	12,655	−0.5%	18.75	671.7
Total cities	—	—	157	3,023,641	2,838,191	+6.5%	2,572.21	1,175.5

== British Columbia ==
In British Columbia, a community can be incorporated as a city if its population exceeds 5,000. Once so incorporated, a city does not lose this status even if its population later declines; the once-larger City of Greenwood, for example, now has a population of just 665 people.

British Columbia has 53 cities.

Cities in British Columbia
Name	Regional district	Incorporation date	Council size	Population (2021)	Population (2016)	Change (%)	Area (km^{2})	Population density (people/km^{2})
Abbotsford	Fraser Valley	December 12, 1995	9	153,524	141,397	8.6	375.33	409.0
Armstrong	North Okanagan	March 31, 1913	7	5,323	5,114	4.1	5.22	1020.0
Burnaby	Metro Vancouver	September 22, 1892	9	249,125	232,755	7.0	90.57	2750.7
Campbell River	Strathcona	June 24, 1947	7	35,519	33,007	7.6	144.38	246.0
Castlegar	Central Kootenay	January 1, 1974	7	8,338	8,039	3.7	19.87	419.6
Chilliwack	Fraser Valley	April 26, 1873	7	93,203	83,788	11.2	261.34	356.6
Colwood	Capital	June 24, 1985	7	18,961	16,859	12.5	17.66	1073.6
Coquitlam	Metro Vancouver	July 25, 1891	9	148,625	139,284	6.7	122.15	1216.7
Courtenay	Comox Valley	January 1, 1915	7	28,420	25,639	10.8	32.42	876.7
Cranbrook	East Kootenay	November 1, 1905	7	20,499	20,047	2.3	31.97	641.2
Dawson Creek	Peace River	May 26, 1936	7	12,323	12,178	1.2	26.72	461.1
Delta	Metro Vancouver	September 22, 2017	7	108,455	102,238	6.1	179.66	603.7
Duncan	Cowichan Valley	March 4, 1912	7	5,047	4,944	2.1	2.06	2444.5
Enderby	North Okanagan	March 1, 1905	7	3,028	2,964	2.2	4.26	710.4
Fernie	East Kootenay	July 28, 1904	7	6,320	5,396	17.1	15.11	418.3
Fort St. John	Peace River	December 31, 1947	7	21,465	20,260	5.9	32.67	656.9
Grand Forks	Kootenay Boundary	April 15, 1897	7	4,112	4,049	1.6	10.37	396.4
Greenwood	Kootenay Boundary	July 12, 1897	5	702	665	5.6	2.42	290.2
Kamloops	Thompson-Nicola	October 17, 1967	9	97,902	90,280	8.4	297.93	328.6
Kelowna	Central Okanagan	May 4, 1905	9	144,576	127,390	13.5	211.85	682.4
Kimberley	East Kootenay	March 29, 1944	7	8,115	7,425	9.3	60.51	134.1
Langford	Capital	December 8, 1992	7	46,584	35,342	31.8	41.43	1124.4
Langley	Metro Vancouver	March 15, 1955	7	28,963	25,888	11.9	10.18	2845.2
Maple Ridge	Metro Vancouver	September 12, 2014	7	90,990	82,256	10.6	267.82	339.7
Merritt	Thompson-Nicola	April 1, 1911	7	7,051	7,139	-1.2	26.04	270.7
Mission	Fraser Valley	March 29, 2021	7	41,519	38,554	7.7	226.98	182.9
Nanaimo	Nanaimo	December 24, 1874	9	99,863	90,504	10.3	90.45	1104.1
Nelson	Central Kootenay	March 18, 1897	7	11,106	10,572	5.1	11.93	930.6
New Westminster	Metro Vancouver	July 16, 1860	7	78,916	70,996	11.2	15.62	5052.4
North Vancouver	Metro Vancouver	August 10, 1891	7	58,120	52,898	9.9	11.83	4913.0
Parksville	Nanaimo	June 19, 1945	7	13,642	12,453	9.5	14.52	939.5
Penticton	Okanagan-Similkameen	January 1, 1909	7	36,885	33,761	9.3	43.03	857.3
Pitt Meadows	Metro Vancouver	April 25, 1914	7	19,146	18,573	3.1	86.34	221.7
Port Alberni	Alberni-Clayoquot	October 28, 1967	7	18,259	17,678	3.3	19.66	928.9
Port Coquitlam	Metro Vancouver	March 7, 1913	7	61,498	58,612	4.9	29.16	2108.7
Port Moody	Metro Vancouver	March 11, 1913	7	33,535	33,551	0.0	25.85	1297.3
Powell River	Powell River	October 15, 1955	7	13,943	13,157	6.0	28.91	482.4
Prince George	Fraser-Fort George	March 6, 1915	9	76,708	74,003	3.7	316.74	242.2
Prince Rupert	North Coast	March 10, 1910	7	12,300	12,220	0.7	66.00	186.4
Quesnel	Cariboo	March 21, 1928	7	9,889	9,879	0.1	35.35	279.8
Revelstoke	Columbia Shuswap	March 1, 1899	7	8,275	7,562	9.4	41.28	200.5
Richmond	Metro Vancouver	November 10, 1879	9	209,937	198,309	5.9	128.87	1629.0
Rossland	Kootenay Boundary	March 18, 1897	7	4,140	3,729	11.0	59.72	69.3
Salmon Arm	Columbia Shuswap	May 15, 1905	7	19,432	17,706	9.7	155.19	125.2
Surrey	Metro Vancouver	November 10, 1879	9	568,322	517,887	9.7	316.11	1797.9
Terrace	Kitimat–Stikine	December 31, 1927	7	12,017	11,643	3.2	57.33	209.6
Trail	Kootenay Boundary	June 14, 1901	7	7,920	7,709	2.7	34.90	226.9
Vancouver (Note: Vancouver is Canada's eighth-largest city and British Columbia's largest city by population. The Vancouver CMA includes the cities of Burnaby, Coquitlam, Delta, Langley, Maple Ridge, New Westminster, North Vancouver, Pitt Meadows, Port Coquitlam, Port Moody, Richmond, Surrey, Vancouver and White Rock.)	Metro Vancouver	April 6, 1886	11	662,248	631,486	4.9	115.18	5749.9
Vernon	North Okanagan	December 30, 1892	7	44,519	40,116	11.0	96.43	461.7
Victoria (Note: Victoria is British Columbia's capital. The Victoria CMA includes the cities of Colwood, Langford and Victoria.)	Capital	August 2, 1862	9	91,867	85,792	7.1	19.45	4722.3
West Kelowna	Central Okanagan	June 26, 2015	7	36,078	32,655	10.5	122.09	295.5
White Rock	Metro Vancouver	April 15, 1957	7	21,939	19,952	10.0	5.17	4240.6
Williams Lake	Cariboo	March 15, 1929	7	10,947	10,753	1.8	33.12	330.5
Total cities	—	—		3,630,140	3,367,053	7.8	4497.15	807.2

== Manitoba ==
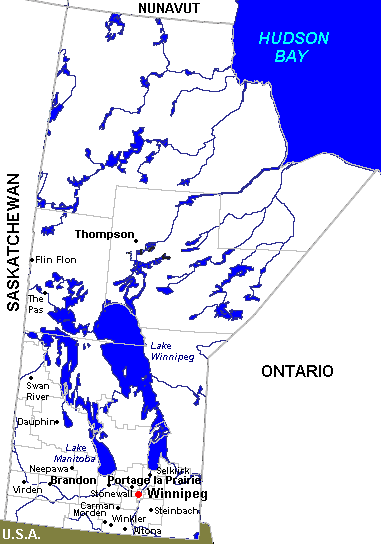
Cities and towns in Manitoba

A community in Manitoba may seek city status once reaching a population of 7,500. Manitoba's newest city is Morden, which changed from town to city status on August 24, 2012.

Manitoba has 10 cities.

Name	Population (2021)	Population (2016)	Change (%)	Area (km^{2})	Population density (2021)
Brandon	51,313	48,883	+5.0%	79.04	649.2
Dauphin (Note: Dauphin is Manitoba's smallest city by area.)	8,368	8,369	0.0%	12.67	660.5
Flin Flon (part) (Note: Flin Flon is Manitoba's smallest city by population. The balance of Flin Flon is located within Saskatchewan.)	4,940	4,991	−1.0%	13.14 (Note: This area does not include 2.37 km^{2} (0.92 mi^{2}) in the Saskatchewan portion of Flin Flon. The city's total area in 2016 was 16.24 km^{2} (6.27 mi^{2}).)	376.1
Morden (Note: Morden is Manitoba's newest city, incorporated August 24, 2012.)	9,929	8,668	+14.5%	16.29	609.6
Portage la Prairie	13,270	13,304	−0.3%	24.72	536.8
Selkirk	10,504	10,278	+2.2%	24.47	429.3
Steinbach	17,806	16,022	+11.1%	37.56	474.1
Thompson	13,035	13,678	−4.7%	16.62	784.3
Winkler	13,747	12,660	+8.6%	20.73	663.1
Winnipeg (Note: Winnipeg is Canada's seventh-largest city and Manitoba's capital and largest city by both population and area. The Winnipeg census metropolitan area (CMA) is formed around the City of Winnipeg.)	749,607	705,224	+6.3%	461.78	1,623.3
Total cities	892,507	841,880	+6.0%	707.02	1,262.35

== New Brunswick ==
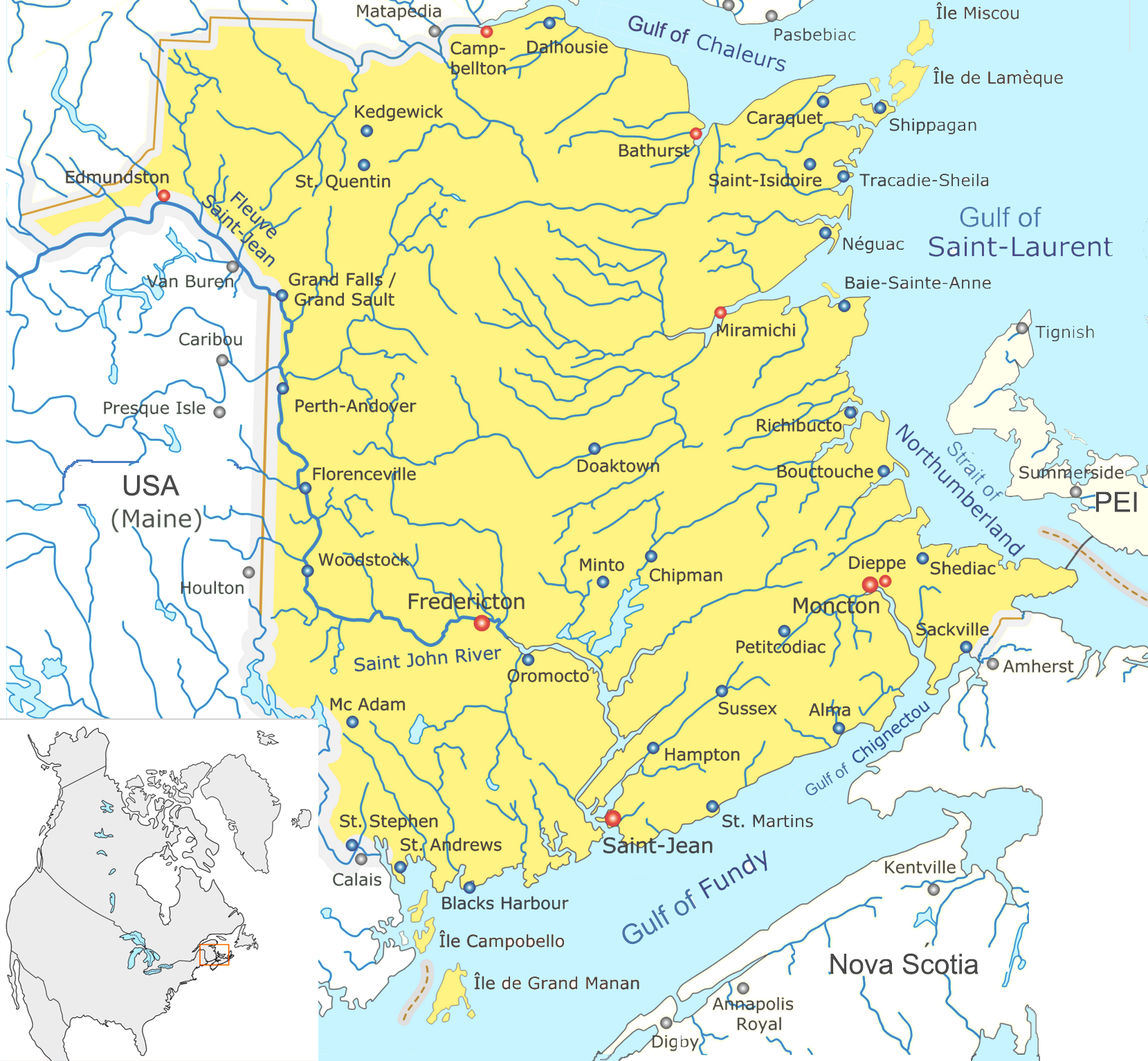
Cities and towns in New Brunswick

New Brunswick has eight cities.

Cities in New Brunswick
Name	County	Incorporation date	Council type	Council size	2021 Census of Population				
Name	County	Incorporation date	Council type	Council size	Population (2021)	Population (2016)	Change	Land area (km^{2})	Population density
Bathurst	Gloucester	January 1, 1966	Hybrid (Note: Bathurst is described as having a "hybrid" council type, containing both councillor and councillor ward seats.)	9	12,157	11,897	+2.2%	91.62	132.7/km^{2}
Campbellton	Restigouche	January 1, 1958	Ward	10	7,047	6,883	+2.4%	18.57	379.5/km^{2}
Dieppe	Westmorland	January 1, 2003	Ward	8	28,114	25,384	+10.8%	77.02	365.0/km^{2}
Edmundston	Madawaska	April 29, 1952	Ward	10	16,437	16,580	−0.9%	106.84	153.8/km^{2}
Fredericton	Sunbury & York	March 30, 1848	Ward	12	63,116	58,721	+7.5%	133.93	471.3/km^{2}
Miramichi	Northumberland	January 1, 1995	At-large	8	17,692	17,537	+0.9%	178.98	98.8/km^{2}
Moncton	Westmorland	April 23, 1890	Ward	10	79,470	71,889	+10.5%	140.67	564.9/km^{2}
Saint John	Saint John	May 18, 1785	Ward	10	69,895	67,575	+3.4%	315.59	221.5/km^{2}
Total cities					293,928	276,466	+6.3%	1,063.22	276.5/km^{2}
New Brunswick					775,610	747,101	+3.8%	71,248.5	10.9/km^{2}

== Newfoundland and Labrador ==
Newfoundland and Labrador has three cities.

Name	Population (2021)	Population (2016)	Change (%)	Area (km^{2})	Population density
Corner Brook (Note: Corner Brook is Newfoundland and Labrador's smallest city by population.)	19,333	19,806	−2.4%	147.88	130.7
Mount Pearl (Note: Mount Pearl is Newfoundland and Labrador's smallest city by area.)	22,477	23,120	−2.8%	15.65	1,436.2
St. John's (Note: St. John's is Newfoundland and Labrador's capital and largest city by both population and area. The St. John's census metropolitan area includes the cities of Mount Pearl and St. John's.)	110,525	108,860	+1.5%	446.02	247.8
Total cities	152,335	151,786	+0.4%	609.55	249.9

== Northwest Territories ==
As in the other two Canadian territories, the only incorporated city in the Northwest Territories is its capital, Yellowknife.

Name	Population (2021)	Population (2016)	Change (%)	Area (km^{2})	Population density
Yellowknife	20,340	19,569	+3.9%	103.37	196.8

== Nova Scotia ==
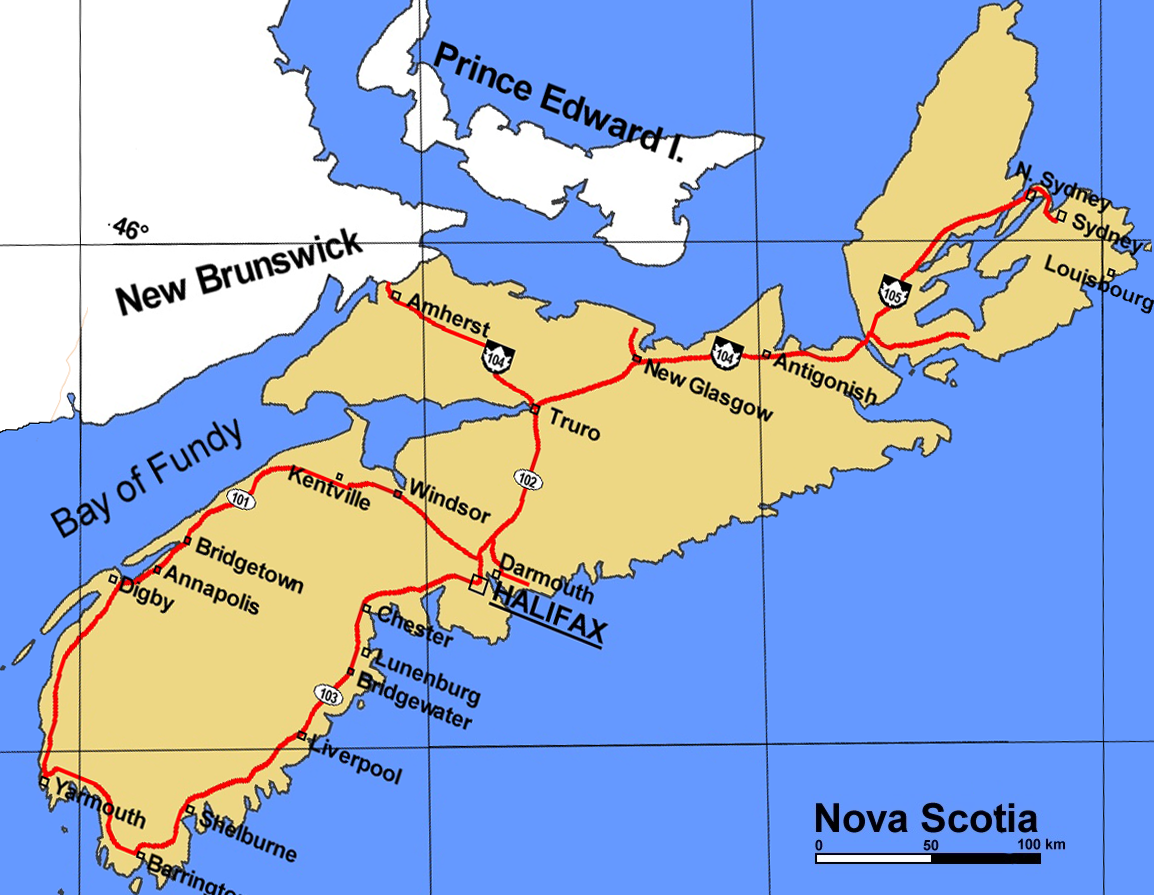
Towns and former cities in Nova Scotia

Nova Scotia no longer has any incorporated cities, as they were amalgamated into regional municipalities in the 1990s.

- Halifax – provincial capital and metropolitan area and formerly the largest city in Nova Scotia by population, now part of the Halifax Regional Municipality
- Sydney – formerly the smallest city in Nova Scotia by population, now part of the Cape Breton Regional Municipality
- Dartmouth – formerly a city in Nova Scotia, now part of the Halifax Regional Municipality

== Nunavut ==
As in the other two Canadian territories, the only incorporated city in Nunavut is its capital, Iqaluit.

Name	Population (2021)	Population (2016)	Change (%)	Area (km^{2})	Population density
Iqaluit	7,429	7,740	−4.0%	51.58	144.0

== Ontario ==
Ontario has 52 cities. In Ontario, city status is conferred by the provincial government, generally upon the request of the incorporated municipality. A municipality may apply for city status anytime after its population surpasses 10,000. This status is not automatically conferred on a community that reaches this population target, but must be requested by the municipality and granted by the provincial Ministry of Municipal Affairs and Housing. Not all municipalities which reach this population target have pursued city designation. For example, Ajax, Oakville, and Whitby, which all had populations greater than 100,000 in 2011, are still designated as towns. Once designated a city, however, a municipality does not lose this status even if its population later falls back below 10,000 (as, for example, Dryden). Ontario's newest city is Richmond Hill, which changed from town to city status on March 25, 2019.

Name	Municipal status	Census division	Population (2021)	Population (2016)	Change (%)	Area (km^{2})	Population density
Barrie (Note: The Barrie census metropolitan area (CMA) is formed around the City of Barrie.)	Single-tier	Simcoe	147,829	141,434	+4.5%	99.01	1,493.1
Belleville	Single-tier	Hastings	55,071	50,716	+8.6%	247.15	222.8
Brampton	Lower-tier	Peel	656,480	593,638	+10.6%	265.89	2,469.0
Brant	Single-tier	Brant	39,474	35,640	+10.8%	817.66	48.3
Brantford (Note: The Brantford CMA includes the City of Brantford as well as the County of Brant, which is a single-tier city.)	Single-tier	Brant	104,688	98,563	+6.2%	98.65	1,061.2
Brockville	Single-tier	Leeds and Grenville	22,116	21,569	+2.5%	20.91	1,057.7
Burlington	Lower-tier	Halton	186,948	183,314	+2.0%	186.12	1,004.4
Cambridge (Note: The City of Cambridge, as well as the cities of Kitchener and Waterloo, form parts of the Kitchener–Cambridge–Waterloo CMA.)	Lower-tier	Waterloo	138,479	129,920	+6.6%	112.99	1,225.6
Clarence-Rockland	Lower-tier	Prescott and Russell	26,505	24,512	+8.1%	297.47	89.1
Cornwall	Single-tier	Stormont, Dundas and Glengarry	47,845	46,589	+2.7%	61.50	778.0
Dryden (Note: Dryden is Ontario's smallest city by population.)	Single-tier	Kenora	7,388	7,749	−4.7%	65.58	112.7
Elliot Lake	Single-tier	Algoma	11,372	10,741	+5.9%	696.06	16.3
Greater Sudbury (Note: Greater Sudbury is Ontario's largest city by area. The Greater Sudbury CMA is formed around the City of Greater Sudbury.)	Single-tier	Sudbury	166,004	161,531	+2.8%	3,186.26	52.1
Guelph	Single-tier	Wellington	143,740	131,794	+9.1%	87.43	1,644.1
Haldimand County	Single-tier	Haldimand	49,216	45,608	+7.9%	1,250.45	39.4
Hamilton (Note: Hamilton is Canada's tenth-largest city. The Hamilton CMA includes the cities of Burlington and Hamilton.)	Single-tier	Hamilton	569,353	536,917	+6.0%	1,118.31	509.1
Kawartha Lakes	Single-tier	Kawartha Lakes	79,247	75,423	+5.1%	3,033.66	26.1
Kenora	Single-tier	Kenora	14,967	15,096	−0.9%	211.65	70.7
Kingston	Single-tier	Frontenac	132,485	123,798	+7.0%	451.58	293.4
Kitchener (Note: The City of Kitchener, as well as the cities of Cambridge and Waterloo, form parts of the Kitchener–Cambridge–Waterloo CMA.)	Lower-tier	Waterloo	256,885	233,222	+10.1%	136.81	1,877.7
London (Note: The London CMA includes the cities of London and St. Thomas.)	Single-tier	Middlesex	422,324	383,822	+10.0%	420.50	1,004.3
Markham	Lower-tier	York	338,503	328,966	+2.9%	210.93	1,604.8
Mississauga (Note: Mississauga is Ontario's largest lower-tier city.)	Lower-tier	Peel	717,961	721,599	−0.5%	292.74	2,452.6
Niagara Falls (Note: The City of Niagara Falls, as well as the cities of Port Colborne, St. Catharines, Thorold and Welland, form parts of the St. Catharines–Niagara CMA.)	Lower-tier	Niagara	94,415	88,071	+7.2%	210.25	449.1
Norfolk County	Single-tier	Norfolk	67,490	64,044	+5.4%	1,597.68	42.2
North Bay	Single-tier	Nipissing	52,662	51,553	+2.2%	315.53	166.9
Orillia	Single-tier	Simcoe	33,411	31,166	+7.2%	28.53	1,171.1
Oshawa (Note: The Oshawa CMA is formed around the City of Oshawa.)	Lower-tier	Durham	175,383	159,458	+10.0%	145.72	1,203.6
Ottawa (Note: Ottawa is Canada's capital and fourth-largest city. The Ontario portion of the Ottawa–Gatineau CMA includes the cities of Clarence-Rockland and Ottawa.)	Single-tier	Ottawa	1,017,449	934,243	+8.9%	2,788.20	364.9
Owen Sound	Lower-tier	Grey	21,612	21,341	+1.3%	24.21	892.7
Pembroke (Note: Pembroke is Ontario's smallest city by area.)	Single-tier	Renfrew	14,364	13,882	+3.5%	14.32	1,003.1
Peterborough (Note: The Peterborough CMA is formed around the City of Peterborough.)	Single-tier	Peterborough	83,651	81,032	+3.2%	64.76	1,291.7
Pickering	Lower-tier	Durham	99,186	91,771	+8.1%	231.10	429.2
Port Colborne	Lower-tier	Niagara	20,033	18,306	+9.4%	121.99	164.2
Prince Edward County	Single-tier	Prince Edward	25,704	24,735	+3.9%	1,052.61	24.4
Quinte West	Single-tier	Hastings	46,560	43,577	+6.8%	495.45	94.0
Richmond Hill (Note: Richmond Hill is Ontario's newest city, adopting the name on March 26, 2019.)	Lower-tier	York	202,022	195,022	+3.6%	100.79	2,004.4
Sarnia	Lower-tier	Lambton	72,047	71,594	+0.6%	163.90	439.6
Sault Ste. Marie	Single-tier	Algoma	72,051	73,368	−1.8%	221.99	324.6
St. Catharines (Note: The City of St. Catharines, as well as the cities of Niagara Falls, Port Colborne, Thorold and Welland, form parts of the St. Catharines–Niagara CMA.)	Lower-tier	Niagara	136,803	133,113	+2.8%	96.20	1,422.1
St. Thomas	Single-tier	Elgin	42,840	38,909	+10.1%	35.61	1,203.0
Stratford	Single-tier	Perth	33,232	31,470	+5.6%	30.02	1,107.0
Temiskaming Shores	Single-tier	Timiskaming	9,634	9,920	−2.9%	176.67	54.5
Thorold	Lower-tier	Niagara	23,816	18,801	+26.7%	83.29	285.9
Thunder Bay (Note: The Thunder Bay CMA is formed around the City of Thunder Bay.)	Single-tier	Thunder Bay	108,843	107,909	+0.9%	327.77	332.1
Timmins	Single-tier	Cochrane	41,145	41,788	−1.5%	2,955.33	13.9
Toronto (Note: Toronto is Ontario's capital and Canada's and Ontario's largest city by population. The Toronto CMA includes the cities of Brampton, Markham, Mississauga, Pickering, Richmond Hill, Toronto and Vaughan.)	Single-tier	Toronto	2,794,356	2,731,571	+2.3%	631.10	4,427.8
Vaughan	Lower-tier	York	323,103	306,233	+5.5%	272.44	1,186.0
Waterloo (Note: The City of Waterloo, as well as the cities of Cambridge and Kitchener, form parts of the Kitchener–Cambridge–Waterloo CMA.)	Lower-tier	Waterloo	121,436	104,986	+15.7%	64.06	1,895.7
Welland	Lower-tier	Niagara	55,750	52,293	+6.6%	81.16	686.9
Windsor (Note: The Windsor CMA is formed around the City of Windsor.)	Single-tier	Essex	229,660	217,188	+5.7%	146.02	1,572.8
Woodstock	Lower-tier	Oxford	46,705	41,098	+13.6%	56.46	827.2
Total cities	—	—	10,400,243	9,900,603	+5.0%	25,902.47	401.5
Total lower-tier cities	—	—	3,714,072	3,517,258	+5.6%	3,154.52	1,177.4
Total single-tier cities	—	—	6,686,171	6,383,345	+4.7%	22,747.95	293.9

== Prince Edward Island ==
Prince Edward Island has two cities.

Name	County	Population (2021)	Population (2016)	Change (%)	Area (km^{2})	Population density
Charlottetown (Note: Charlottetown is Prince Edward Island's capital and larger city by population and area.)	Queens	38,809	36,094	+7.5%	44.27	876.6
Summerside (Note: Summerside is Prince Edward Island's smaller city by population and area.)	Prince	16,001	14,839	+7.8%	28.21	567.2
Total cities	–	54,810	50,933	+7.6%	72.48	756.2

== Quebec ==
In Quebec, provincial law does not contain any cities at the current time, although the designation exists. — A ville, though legally a "township", may be informally referred to as a town or a city in English, but this is an arbitrary and subjective distinction. Quebec municipal types are cities (cités), townships (villes), and municipalités (municipalités).

Quebec has 223 villes.

Name	Region	Census division	CMA/CA	Population (2021)	Population (2016)	Change (%)	Area (km^{2})	Population density (/km^{2})
Acton Vale	Montérégie	Acton		7,605	7,656	−0.7%	91.01	83.6
Alma	Saguenay–Lac-Saint-Jean	Lac-Saint-Jean-Est		30,331	30,771	−1.4%	194.92	155.6
Amos	Abitibi-Témiscamingue	Abitibi	Amos	12,675	12,823	−1.2%	429.04	29.5
Amqui	Bas-Saint-Laurent	La Matapédia		5,999	6,178	−2.9%	121.02	49.6
Baie-Comeau	Côte-Nord	Manicouagan	Baie-Comeau	20,687	21,536	−3.9%	334.83	61.8
Baie-D'Urfé	Montréal	Montréal	Montréal	3,764	3,823	−1.5%	6.03	624.2
Baie-Saint-Paul	Capitale-Nationale	Charlevoix		7,371	7,146	+3.1%	545.85	13.5
Barkmere	Laurentides	Les Laurentides		81	58	+39.7%	17.72	4.6
Beaconsfield	Montréal	Montréal	Montréal	19,277	19,324	−0.2%	11.03	1,747.7
Beauceville	Chaudière-Appalaches	Beauce-Centre		6,185	6,291	−1.7%	164.59	37.6
Beauharnois	Montérégie	Beauharnois-Salaberry	Montréal	13,638	12,884	+5.9%	68.22	199.9
Beaupré	Capitale-Nationale	La Côte-de-Beaupré		4,117	3,752	+9.7%	22.97	179.2
Bécancour	Centre-du-Québec	Bécancour	Trois-Rivières	13,561	13,031	+4.1%	439.54	30.9
Bedford	Montérégie	Brome-Missisquoi		2,558	2,560	−0.1%	4.23	604.7
Belleterre	Abitibi-Témiscamingue	Témiscamingue		285	313	−8.9%	544.49	0.5
Beloeil	Montérégie	La Vallée-du-Richelieu	Montréal	24,104	22,458	+7.3%	24.38	988.7
Berthierville	Lanaudière	D'Autray		4,386	4,189	+4.7%	6.77	647.9
Blainville	Laurentides	Thérèse-De Blainville	Montréal	59,819	56,863	+5.2%	54.97	1,088.2
Boisbriand	Laurentides	Thérèse-De Blainville	Montréal	28,308	26,884	+5.3%	27.67	1,023.1
Bois-des-Filion	Laurentides	Thérèse-De Blainville	Montréal	10,159	9,636	+5.4%	4.36	2,330.0
Bonaventure	Gaspésie–Îles-de-la-Madeleine	Bonaventure		2,733	2,706	+1.0%	104.5	26.2
Boucherville	Montérégie	Longueuil	Montréal	41,743	41,671	+0.2%	71.02	587.8
Bromont	Montérégie	Brome-Missisquoi	Granby	11,357	9,041	+25.6%	114.05	99.6
Brossard	Montérégie	Longueuil	Montréal	91,525	85,721	+6.8%	45.19	2,025.3
Brownsburg-Chatham	Laurentides	Argenteuil		7,247	7,122	+1.8%	244.46	29.6
Candiac	Montérégie	Roussillon	Montréal	22,997	21,047	+9.3%	17.27	1,331.6
Cap-Chat	Gaspésie–Îles-de-la-Madeleine	La Haute-Gaspésie		2,516	2,476	+1.6%	181.31	13.9
Cap-Santé	Capitale-Nationale	Portneuf		3,594	3,410	+5.4%	54.49	66.0
Carignan	Montérégie	La Vallée-du-Richelieu	Montréal	11,740	9,462	+24.1%	62.07	189.1
Carleton-sur-Mer	Gaspésie–Îles-de-la-Madeleine	Avignon		4,081	4,073	+0.2%	221.48	18.4
Causapscal	Bas-Saint-Laurent	La Matapédia		2,147	2,304	−6.8%	161.61	13.3
Chambly	Montérégie	La Vallée-du-Richelieu	Montréal	31,444	29,120	+8.0%	25.08	1,253.7
Chandler	Gaspésie–Îles-de-la-Madeleine	Le Rocher-Percé		7,490	7,546	−0.7%	418.45	17.9
Chapais	Nord-du-Québec	Jamésie		1,468	1,499	−2.1%	62.31	23.6
Charlemagne	Lanaudière	L'Assomption	Montréal	6,302	5,913	+6.6%	2.17	2,904.1
Châteauguay	Montérégie	Roussillon	Montréal	50,815	47,906	+6.1%	34.31	1,481.1
Château-Richer	Capitale-Nationale	La Côte-de-Beaupré	Québec	4,425	4,126	+7.2%	228.84	19.3
Chibougamau	Nord-du-Québec	Jamésie		7,233	7,504	−3.6%	694.87	10.4
Clermont	Capitale-Nationale	Charlevoix-Est		3,065	3,085	−0.6%	51.53	59.5
Coaticook	Estrie	Coaticook		8,867	8,955	−1.0%	219.45	40.4
Contrecoeur	Montérégie	Marguerite-D'Youville		9,480	7,887	+20.2%	62.2	152.4
Cookshire-Eaton	Estrie	Le Haut-Saint-François		5,344	5,393	−0.9%	296.25	18.0
Coteau-du-Lac	Montérégie	Vaudreuil-Soulanges	Montréal	7,473	7,044	+6.1%	46.87	159.4
Côte-Saint-Luc	Montréal	Montréal	Montréal	34,504	32,448	+6.3%	7.04	4,901.1
Cowansville	Montérégie	Brome-Missisquoi		15,234	13,656	+11.6%	46.87	325.0
Crabtree	Lanaudière	Joliette		4,155	3,958	+5.0%	25.06	165.8
Danville	Estrie	Les Sources		3,888	3,826	+1.6%	151.73	25.6
Daveluyville	Centre-du-Québec	Arthabaska		2,360	2,255	+4.7%	61.71	38.2
Dégelis	Bas-Saint-Laurent	Témiscouata		2,884	2,863	+0.7%	556.78	5.2
Delson	Montérégie	Roussillon	Montréal	8,328	7,457	+11.7%	7.64	1,090.1
Desbiens	Saguenay–Lac-Saint-Jean	Lac-Saint-Jean-Est		995	1,028	−3.2%	10.39	95.8
Deux-Montagnes	Laurentides	Deux-Montagnes	Montréal	17,915	17,496	+2.4%	6.08	2,946.5
Disraeli	Chaudière-Appalaches	Les Appalaches		2,360	2,336	+1.0%	6.8	347.1
Dolbeau-Mistassini	Saguenay–Lac-Saint-Jean	Maria-Chapdelaine	Dolbeau-Mistassini	13,718	14,212	−3.5%	293.43	46.8
Dollard-des-Ormeaux	Montréal	Montréal	Montréal	48,403	48,899	−1.0%	14.98	3,231.2
Donnacona	Capitale-Nationale	Portneuf		7,436	7,200	+3.3%	20.2	368.1
Dorval	Montréal	Montréal	Montréal	19,302	18,980	+1.7%	20.91	923.1
Drummondville	Centre-du-Québec	Drummond	Drummondville	79,258	75,423	+5.1%	247.11	320.7
Dunham	Montérégie	Brome-Missisquoi		3,599	3,432	+4.9%	193.86	18.6
Duparquet	Abitibi-Témiscamingue	Abitibi-Ouest		716	666	+7.5%	121.17	5.9
East Angus	Estrie	Le Haut-Saint-François		3,840	3,659	+4.9%	7.84	489.8
Estérel	Laurentides	Les Pays-d'en-Haut		262	196	+33.7%	12.62	20.8
Farnham	Montérégie	Brome-Missisquoi		10,149	8,909	+13.9%	92.12	110.2
Fermont	Côte-Nord	Caniapiscau		2,256	2,474	−8.8%	451.12	5.0
Forestville	Côte-Nord	La Haute-Côte-Nord		2,892	3,081	−6.1%	192.61	15.0
Fossambault-sur-le-Lac	Capitale-Nationale	La Jacques-Cartier	Québec	2,327	1,960	+18.7%	11.49	202.5
Gaspé	Gaspésie–Îles-de-la-Madeleine	La Côte-de-Gaspé		15,063	14,568	+3.4%	1,118.77	13.5
Gatineau	Outaouais	Gatineau	Ottawa–Gatineau	291,041	276,245	+5.4%	341.84	851.4
Gracefield	Outaouais	La Vallée-de-la-Gatineau		2,376	2,462	−3.5%	380.94	6.2
Granby	Montérégie	La Haute-Yamaska	Granby	69,025	66,222	+4.2%	152.69	452.1
Grande-Rivière	Gaspésie–Îles-de-la-Madeleine	Le Rocher-Percé		3,384	3,408	−0.7%	87.92	38.5
Hampstead	Montréal	Montréal	Montréal	7,037	6,973	+0.9%	1.79	3,931.3
Hudson	Montérégie	Vaudreuil-Soulanges	Montréal	5,411	5,157	+4.9%	21.79	248.3
Huntingdon	Montérégie	Le Haut-Saint-Laurent		2,556	2,444	+4.6%	2.77	922.7
Joliette	Lanaudière	Joliette	Joliette	21,384	20,484	+4.4%	22.96	931.4
Kingsey Falls	Centre-du-Québec	Arthabaska		1,986	1,947	+2.0%	69.36	28.6
Kirkland	Montréal	Montréal	Montréal	19,413	20,151	−3.7%	9.65	2,011.7
La Malbaie	Capitale-Nationale	Charlevoix-Est		8,235	8,271	−0.4%	458.19	18.0
La Pocatière	Bas-Saint-Laurent	Kamouraska		4,078	4,120	−1.0%	21.18	192.5
La Prairie	Montérégie	Roussillon	Montréal	26,406	24,110	+9.5%	43.47	607.5
La Sarre	Abitibi-Témiscamingue	Abitibi-Ouest		7,358	7,282	+1.0%	148.36	49.6
La Tuque (Note: La Tuque is Quebec's largest ville by area.)	Mauricie	La Tuque		11,129	11,001	+1.2%	24,809.4	0.4
Lac-Brome	Montérégie	Brome-Missisquoi		5,923	5,495	+7.8%	206.9	28.6
Lac-Delage	Capitale-Nationale	La Jacques-Cartier	Québec	771	638	+20.8%	1.58	488.0
Lac-des-Aigles	Bas-Saint-Laurent	Témiscouata		571	566	+0.9%	226.17	2.5
Lachute	Laurentides	Argenteuil		14,100	12,862	+9.6%	108.66	129.8
Lac-Mégantic	Estrie	Le Granit		5,747	5,654	+1.6%	21.98	261.5
Lac-Saint-Joseph	Capitale-Nationale	La Jacques-Cartier	Québec	304	260	+16.9%	33.65	9.0
Lac-Sergent	Capitale-Nationale	Portneuf		541	497	+8.9%	3.72	145.4
L'Ancienne-Lorette	Capitale-Nationale	Québec	Québec	16,970	16,543	+2.6%	7.72	2,198.2
L'Assomption	Lanaudière	L'Assomption	Montréal	23,442	22,429	+4.5%	98.74	237.4
Laval	Laval	Laval	Montréal	438,366	422,993	+3.6%	246.13	1,781.0
Lavaltrie	Lanaudière	D'Autray	Montréal	14,425	13,657	+5.6%	68.22	211.4
Lebel-sur-Quévillon	Nord-du-Québec	Jamésie		2,091	2,187	−4.4%	44.41	47.1
L'Épiphanie	Lanaudière	L'Assomption	Montréal	8,883	8,693	+2.2%	56.57	157.0
Léry	Montérégie	Roussillon	Montréal	2,390	2,318	+3.1%	10.36	230.7
Lévis	Chaudière-Appalaches	Lévis	Québec	149,683	143,414	+4.4%	448.07	334.1
L'Île-Cadieux	Montérégie	Vaudreuil-Soulanges	Montréal	120	126	−4.8%	0.59	203.4
L'Île-Dorval (Note: L'Île-Dorval is Quebec's smallest ville by both population and area.)	Montréal	Montréal	Montréal	30	5	+500.0%	0.19	157.9
L'Île-Perrot	Montérégie	Vaudreuil-Soulanges	Montréal	11,638	10,756	+8.2%	5.46	2,131.5
Longueuil	Montérégie	Longueuil	Montréal	254,483	239,897	+6.1%	115.77	2,198.2
Lorraine	Laurentides	Thérèse-De Blainville	Montréal	9,502	9,352	+1.6%	5.9	1,610.5
Louiseville	Mauricie	Maskinongé		7,340	7,152	+2.6%	62.59	117.3
Macamic	Abitibi-Témiscamingue	Abitibi-Ouest		2,744	2,751	−0.3%	202.05	13.6
Magog	Estrie	Memphrémagog	Sherbrooke	28,312	26,669	+6.2%	144.26	196.3
Malartic	Abitibi-Témiscamingue	La Vallée-de-l'Or		3,355	3,377	−0.7%	147.45	22.8
Maniwaki	Outaouais	La Vallée-de-la-Gatineau		3,757	3,843	−2.2%	5.67	662.6
Marieville	Montérégie	Rouville		11,332	10,725	+5.7%	63.23	179.2
Mascouche	Lanaudière	Les Moulins	Montréal	51,183	46,692	+9.6%	106.89	478.8
Matagami	Nord-du-Québec	Jamésie		1,402	1,453	−3.5%	75.12	18.7
Matane	Bas-Saint-Laurent	La Matanie	Matane	13,987	14,311	−2.3%	195.49	71.5
McMasterville	Montérégie	La Vallée-du-Richelieu	Montréal	5,936	5,698	+4.2%	3.12	1,902.6
Mercier	Montérégie	Roussillon	Montréal	14,626	13,115	+11.5%	45.96	318.2
Métabetchouan--Lac-à-la-Croix	Saguenay–Lac-Saint-Jean	Lac-Saint-Jean-Est		4,121	3,985	+3.4%	187.49	22.0
Métis-sur-Mer	Bas-Saint-Laurent	La Mitis		594	572	+3.8%	48.22	12.3
Mirabel	Laurentides	Mirabel	Montréal	61,108	50,513	+21.0%	484.09	126.2
Mont-Joli	Bas-Saint-Laurent	La Mitis		6,384	6,281	+1.6%	24.24	263.4
Mont-Laurier	Laurentides	Antoine-Labelle		14,180	14,116	+0.5%	587.42	24.1
Montmagny	Chaudière-Appalaches	Montmagny		10,999	11,255	−2.3%	124.44	88.4
Montréal (Note: Montreal is Canada's second-largest ville and Quebec's largest ville by population.)	Montréal	Montréal	Montréal	1,762,949	1,704,694	+3.4%	364.74	4,833.4
Montréal-Est	Montréal	Montréal	Montréal	4,394	3,850	+14.1%	12.15	361.6
Montréal-Ouest	Montréal	Montréal	Montréal	5,115	5,050	+1.3%	1.37	3,733.6
Mont-Royal	Montréal	Montréal	Montréal	20,953	20,276	+3.3%	7.55	2,775.2
Mont-Saint-Hilaire	Montérégie	La Vallée-du-Richelieu	Montréal	18,859	18,585	+1.5%	44.08	427.8
Mont-Tremblant	Laurentides	Les Laurentides		10,992	9,646	+14.0%	233.75	47.0
Murdochville	Gaspésie–Îles-de-la-Madeleine	La Côte-de-Gaspé		643	651	−1.2%	60.84	10.6
Neuville	Capitale-Nationale	Portneuf	Québec	4,475	4,392	+1.9%	71.92	62.2
New Richmond	Gaspésie–Îles-de-la-Madeleine	Bonaventure		3,683	3,706	−0.6%	172.5	21.4
Nicolet	Centre-du-Québec	Nicolet-Yamaska		8,620	8,169	+5.5%	96.11	89.7
Normandin	Saguenay–Lac-Saint-Jean	Maria-Chapdelaine		2,991	3,033	−1.4%	211.79	14.1
Notre-Dame-de-l'Île-Perrot	Montérégie	Vaudreuil-Soulanges	Montréal	11,427	10,654	+7.3%	28.06	407.2
Notre-Dame-des-Prairies	Lanaudière	Joliette	Joliette	9,471	9,273	+2.1%	18.1	523.3
Otterburn Park	Montérégie	La Vallée-du-Richelieu	Montréal	8,479	8,421	+0.7%	5.37	1,579.0
Paspébiac	Gaspésie–Îles-de-la-Madeleine	Bonaventure		3,033	3,164	−4.1%	94.98	31.9
Percé	Gaspésie–Îles-de-la-Madeleine	Le Rocher-Percé	Québec	3,095	3,103	−0.3%	432.81	7.2
Pincourt	Montérégie	Vaudreuil-Soulanges	Montréal	14,751	14,558	+1.3%	7.1	2,077.6
Plessisville	Centre-du-Québec	L'Érable		9,069	9,214	−1.6%	146.11	62.1
Pohénégamook	Bas-Saint-Laurent	Témiscouata		2,481	2,582	−3.9%	339.99	7.3
Pointe-Claire	Montréal	Montréal	Montréal	33,488	31,380	+6.7%	18.91	1,770.9
Pont-Rouge	Capitale-Nationale	Portneuf		10,121	9,240	+9.5%	121.12	83.6
Port-Cartier	Côte-Nord	Sept-Rivières		6,516	6,799	−4.2%	1,092.75	6.0
Portneuf	Capitale-Nationale	Portneuf		3,329	3,187	+4.5%	109.1	30.5
Prévost	Laurentides	La Rivière-du-Nord		13,692	13,002	+5.3%	34.29	399.3
Princeville	Centre-du-Québec	L'Érable		6,218	6,001	+3.6%	195.01	31.9
Québec (Note: Quebec City is Quebec's capital.)	Capitale-Nationale	Québec	Québec	549,459	531,902	+3.3%	452.3	1,214.8
Repentigny	Lanaudière	L'Assomption	Montréal	86,100	84,285	+2.2%	61.52	1,399.5
Richelieu	Montérégie	Rouville	Montréal	5,742	5,236	+9.7%	30.96	185.5
Richmond	Estrie	Le Val-Saint-François		3,259	3,232	+0.8%	6.98	466.9
Rigaud	Montérégie	Vaudreuil-Soulanges		7,854	7,777	+1.0%	99.2	79.2
Rimouski	Bas-Saint-Laurent	Rimouski-Neigette	Rimouski	48,935	48,664	+0.6%	339.13	144.3
Rivière-du-Loup	Bas-Saint-Laurent	Rivière-du-Loup	Rivière-du-Loup	20,118	19,507	+3.1%	83.74	240.2
Rivière-Rouge	Laurentides	Antoine-Labelle		4,631	4,322	+7.1%	451.43	10.3
Roberval	Saguenay–Lac-Saint-Jean	Le Domaine-du-Roy		9,840	10,046	−2.1%	151.36	65.0
Rosemère	Laurentides	Thérèse-De Blainville	Montréal	14,090	13,958	+0.9%	10.68	1,319.3
Rouyn-Noranda	Abitibi-Témiscamingue	Rouyn-Noranda		42,313	42,334	0.0%	5,963.57	7.1
Saguenay	Saguenay–Lac-Saint-Jean	Saguenay	Saguenay	144,723	145,949	−0.8%	1,124.63	128.7
Saint-Amable	Montérégie	Marguerite-D'Youville	Montréal	13,322	12,167	+9.5%	36.77	362.3
Saint-Antonin	Bas-Saint-Laurent	Rivière-du-Loup	Rivière-du-Loup	4,338	4,049	+7.1%	175.93	24.7
Saint-Augustin-de-Desmaures	Capitale-Nationale	Québec	Québec	19,907	18,820	+5.8%	85.8	232.0
Saint-Basile	Capitale-Nationale	Portneuf		2,709	2,621	+3.4%	98.84	27.4
Saint-Basile-le-Grand	Montérégie	La Vallée-du-Richelieu	Montréal	17,053	17,059	0.0%	35.84	475.8
Saint-Bruno-de-Montarville	Montérégie	Longueuil	Montréal	26,273	26,197	+0.3%	42.85	613.1
Saint-Césaire	Montérégie	Rouville		5,972	5,877	+1.6%	83.06	71.9
Saint-Charles-Borromée	Lanaudière	Joliette	Joliette	15,285	13,791	+10.8%	18.48	827.1
Saint-Colomban	Laurentides	La Rivière-du-Nord	Montréal	17,740	16,019	+10.7%	92.71	191.3
Saint-Constant	Montérégie	Roussillon	Montréal	29,954	27,359	+9.5%	57.06	525.0
Sainte-Adèle	Laurentides	Les Pays-d'en-Haut		14,010	12,919	+8.4%	119.67	117.1
Sainte-Agathe-des-Monts	Laurentides	Les Laurentides	Sainte-Agathe-des-Monts	11,211	10,223	+9.7%	129.1	86.8
Sainte-Anne-de-Beaupré	Capitale-Nationale	La Côte-de-Beaupré		2,888	2,880	+0.3%	62.38	46.3
Sainte-Anne-de-Bellevue	Montréal	Montréal	Montréal	5,027	4,958	+1.4%	10.46	480.6
Sainte-Anne-des-Monts	Gaspésie–Îles-de-la-Madeleine	La Haute-Gaspésie		6,121	6,437	−4.9%	263.51	23.2
Sainte-Anne-des-Plaines	Laurentides	Thérèse-De Blainville	Montréal	15,221	14,421	+5.5%	93.44	162.9
Sainte-Brigitte-de-Laval	Capitale-Nationale	La Jacques-Cartier	Québec	8,468	7,348	+15.2%	108.42	78.1
Sainte-Catherine	Montérégie	Roussillon	Montréal	17,347	17,047	+1.8%	9.37	1,851.3
Sainte-Catherine-de-la-Jacques-Cartier	Capitale-Nationale	La Jacques-Cartier	Québec	8,442	7,706	+9.6%	120.7	69.9
Sainte-Julie	Montérégie	Marguerite-D'Youville	Montréal	30,045	29,881	+0.5%	48.49	619.6
Sainte-Marguerite-du-Lac-Masson	Laurentides	Les Pays-d'en-Haut		3,367	2,763	+21.9%	91.56	36.8
Sainte-Marie	Chaudière-Appalaches	La Nouvelle-Beauce		13,134	13,565	−3.2%	107.55	122.1
Sainte-Marthe-sur-le-Lac	Laurentides	Deux-Montagnes	Montréal	19,797	18,074	+9.5%	8.73	2,267.7
Sainte-Thérèse	Laurentides	Thérèse-De Blainville	Montréal	26,533	25,989	+2.1%	9.48	2,798.8
Saint-Eustache	Laurentides	Deux-Montagnes	Montréal	45,276	44,008	+2.9%	70.51	642.1
Saint-Félicien	Saguenay–Lac-Saint-Jean	Le Domaine-du-Roy		10,089	10,238	−1.5%	361.27	27.9
Saint-Gabriel	Lanaudière	D'Autray		2,803	2,640	+6.2%	2.81	997.5
Saint-Georges	Chaudière-Appalaches	Beauce-Sartigan	Saint-Georges	32,935	32,513	+1.3%	199.08	165.4
Saint-Honoré	Saguenay–Lac-Saint-Jean	Le Fjord-du-Saguenay	Saguenay	6,376	5,757	+10.8%	189.38	33.7
Saint-Hyacinthe	Montérégie	Les Maskoutains	Saint-Hyacinthe	57,239	55,648	+2.9%	188.85	303.1
Saint-Jean-sur-Richelieu	Montérégie	Le Haut-Richelieu	Montréal	97,873	95,114	+2.9%	226.93	431.3
Saint-Jérôme	Laurentides	La Rivière-du-Nord	Montréal	80,213	74,346	+7.9%	90.18	889.5
Saint-Joseph-de-Beauce	Chaudière-Appalaches	Beauce-Centre		5,014	4,858	+3.2%	114.7	43.7
Saint-Joseph-de-Sorel	Montérégie	Pierre-De Saurel	Sorel-Tracy	1,581	1,642	−3.7%	1.36	1,162.5
Saint-Lambert	Montérégie	Longueuil	Montréal	22,761	21,861	+4.1%	7.56	3,010.7
Saint-Lazare	Montérégie	Vaudreuil-Soulanges	Montréal	22,354	19,917	+12.2%	66.86	334.3
Saint-Lin--Laurentides	Lanaudière	Montcalm	Montréal	24,030	20,786	+15.6%	118.29	203.1
Saint-Marc-des-Carrières	Capitale-Nationale	Portneuf		2,901	2,911	−0.3%	17.29	167.8
Saint-Ours	Montérégie	Pierre-De Saurel		1,723	1,669	+3.2%	59.23	29.1
Saint-Pamphile	Chaudière-Appalaches	L'Islet		2,274	2,400	−5.2%	137.78	16.5
Saint-Pascal	Bas-Saint-Laurent	Kamouraska		3,530	3,468	+1.8%	59.68	59.1
Saint-Philippe	Montérégie	Roussillon	Montréal	7,597	6,320	+20.2%	61.96	122.6
Saint-Pie	Montérégie	Les Maskoutains		5,847	5,607	+4.3%	107.42	54.4
Saint-Raymond	Capitale-Nationale	Portneuf		11,108	10,358	+7.2%	666.2	16.7
Saint-Rémi	Montérégie	Les Jardins-de-Napierville		8,957	8,061	+11.1%	78.18	114.6
Saint-Sauveur	Laurentides	Les Pays-d'en-Haut		11,580	10,231	+13.2%	47.62	243.2
Saint-Tite	Mauricie	Mékinac		3,672	3,673	0.0%	91.1	40.3
Saint-Zotique	Montérégie	Vaudreuil-Soulanges	Montréal	9,618	7,934	+21.2%	25.04	384.1
Salaberry-de-Valleyfield	Montérégie	Beauharnois-Salaberry		42,787	40,745	+5.0%	108.56	394.1
Schefferville	Côte-Nord	Caniapiscau		244	130	+87.7%	24.76	9.9
Scotstown	Estrie	Le Haut-Saint-François		459	472	−2.8%	11.44	40.1
Senneterre	Abitibi-Témiscamingue	La Vallée-de-l'Or		2,782	2,868	−3.0%	14,718.51	0.2
Sept-Îles	Côte-Nord	Sept-Rivières	Sept-Îles	24,569	25,400	−3.3%	1,742.88	14.1
Shannon	Capitale-Nationale	La Jacques-Cartier	Québec	6,432	6,031	+6.6%	63.54	101.2
Shawinigan	Mauricie	Shawinigan		49,620	49,349	+0.5%	729.98	68.0
Sherbrooke	Estrie	Sherbrooke	Sherbrooke	172,950	161,323	+7.2%	353.4	489.4
Sorel-Tracy	Montérégie	Pierre-De Saurel	Sorel-Tracy	35,165	34,755	+1.2%	57.28	613.9
Stanstead	Estrie	Memphrémagog		2,824	2,788	+1.3%	21.95	128.7
Sutton	Montérégie	Brome-Missisquoi		4,548	4,012	+13.4%	245.69	18.5
Témiscaming	Abitibi-Témiscamingue	Témiscamingue		2,368	2,431	−2.6%	710.84	3.3
Témiscouata-sur-le-Lac	Bas-Saint-Laurent	Témiscouata		5,054	4,910	+2.9%	218.81	23.1
Terrebonne	Lanaudière	Les Moulins	Montréal	119,944	111,575	+7.5%	153.76	780.1
Thetford Mines	Chaudière-Appalaches	Les Appalaches	Thetford Mines	26,072	25,403	+2.6%	225.97	115.4
Thurso	Outaouais	Papineau	Ottawa–Gatineau	3,084	2,818	+9.4%	6.65	463.8
Trois-Pistoles	Bas-Saint-Laurent	Les Basques		3,115	3,246	−4.0%	7.63	408.3
Trois-Rivières	Mauricie	Trois-Rivières	Trois-Rivières	139,163	134,413	+3.5%	288.65	482.1
Valcourt	Estrie	Le Val-Saint-François		2,139	2,165	−1.2%	5.41	395.4
Val-des-Sources	Estrie	Les Sources		7,088	6,786	+4.5%	30.25	234.3
Val-d'Or	Abitibi-Témiscamingue	La Vallée-de-l'Or	Val-d'Or	32,752	32,491	+0.8%	3,536.84	9.3
Varennes	Montérégie	Marguerite-D'Youville	Montréal	21,198	21,257	−0.3%	94.8	223.6
Vaudreuil-Dorion	Montérégie	Vaudreuil-Soulanges	Montréal	43,268	38,117	+13.5%	72.65	595.6
Victoriaville	Centre-du-Québec	Arthabaska	Victoriaville	47,760	46,130	+3.5%	84.33	566.3
Ville-Marie	Abitibi-Témiscamingue	Témiscamingue		2,464	2,584	−4.6%	5.83	422.6
Warwick	Centre-du-Québec	Arthabaska		4,729	4,635	+2.0%	109.6	43.1
Waterloo	Montérégie	La Haute-Yamaska		4,920	4,410	+11.6%	12.23	402.3
Waterville	Estrie	Coaticook	Sherbrooke	2,307	2,121	+8.8%	44.03	52.4
Westmount	Montréal	Montréal	Montréal	19,658	20,312	−3.2%	4.04	4,865.8
Windsor	Estrie	Le Val-Saint-François		5,294	5,419	−2.3%	14.53	364.3
Total cities	—	—	—	7,166,179	6,884,364	+4.1%	82,006.65	87.4

== Saskatchewan ==
In Saskatchewan, Section 39(1) of The Cities Act indicates a town must have a population of 5,000 or more and meet other criteria in order to incorporate as a city, although in the early 20th century several centres such as Saskatoon and Regina were granted city status despite having a smaller population. The City of Melville retains its city status despite dropping below 5,000 people in the 1990s. Kindersley has expressed an interest in applying for city status upon reaching the 5,000 milestone. Saskatchewan's newest city is Warman, which changed from town to city status on October 24, 2012.

Saskatchewan has 16 cities.

Name	Rural municipality	Incorporation date (city)	Population (2021)	Population (2016)	Change (%)	Land area (km^{2})	Land area (sq mi)	Population density (/km^{2})	Population density (/sq mi)
Estevan	Estevan No. 5	March 1, 1957	10,851	11,483	−5.5%	18.30	7.07	593.0	1,536
Flin Flon (part) (Note: The balance of Flin Flon is located within Manitoba.)	—	—	159 (Note: This population does not include 4,940 in the Manitoba portion of Flin Flon. The city's total population in 2021 was 5,099.)	203	−21.7%	2.01 (Note: This area does not include 13.14 km^{2} (5.07 mi^{2}) in the Manitoba portion of Flin Flon. The city's total area in 2021 was 15.15 km^{2} (5.85 mi^{2}).)	0.78	79.1	205
Humboldt	Humboldt No. 370	November 7, 2000	6,033	5,869	+2.8%	13.30	5.14	453.6	1,175
Lloydminster (part) (Note: The balance of Lloydminster is located within Alberta.)	Britannia No. 502; Wilton No. 472	January 1, 1958	11,843 (Note: This population does not include 19,739 in the Alberta portion of Lloydminster. The city's total population in 2021 was 31,582.)	11,765	+0.7%	18.06 (Note: This area does not include 23.98 km^{2} (9.26 mi^{2}) in the Alberta portion of Lloydminster. The city's total area in 2021 was 42.04 km^{2} (16.23 mi^{2}).)	6.97	655.8	1,699
Martensville (Note: Martensville is Saskatchewan's smallest city by area.)	Corman Park No. 344	November 3, 2009	10,549	9,655	+9.3%	13.56	5.24	777.9	2,015
Meadow Lake	Meadow Lake No. 588	November 9, 2009	5,322	5,344	−0.4%	12.37	4.78	430.2	1,114
Melfort	Star City No. 428	September 2, 1980	5,955	5,992	−0.6%	14.73	5.69	404.3	1,047
Melville (Note: Melville is Saskatchewan's smallest city by population.)	Cana No. 214	August 1, 1960	4,493	4,562	−1.5%	14.78	5.71	304.0	787
Moose Jaw	Moose Jaw No. 161	November 20, 1903	33,665	33,910	−0.7%	65.81	25.41	511.5	1,325
North Battleford	North Battleford No. 437	May 1, 1913	13,836	14,315	−3.3%	33.55	12.95	412.4	1,068
Prince Albert	Prince Albert No. 461	October 8, 1904	37,756	35,926	+5.1%	67.17	25.93	562.1	1,456
Regina (Note: Regina is Saskatchewan's capital and was its first city, incorporated June 19, 1903. The Regina census metropolitan area (CMA) is formed around the City of Regina.)	Sherwood No. 159	June 19, 1903	226,404	215,106	+5.3%	178.81	69.04	1,266.2	3,279
Saskatoon (Note: Saskatoon is Saskatchewan's largest city by both population and area. The Saskatoon CMA includes the cities of Martensville and Saskatoon.)	Corman Park No. 344	May 26, 1906	266,141	247,201	+7.7%	226.56	87.48	1,174.7	3,042
Swift Current	Swift Current No. 137	January 15, 1914	16,750	16,604	+0.9%	29.30	11.31	571.7	1,481
Warman (Note: Warman is Saskatchewan's newest city, incorporated October 27, 2012.)	Corman Park No. 344	October 27, 2012	12,419	11,020	+12.7%	13.10	5.06	948.0	2,455
Weyburn	Weyburn No. 67	September 1, 1913	11,019	10,870	+1.4%	19.03	7.35	579.0	1,500
Yorkton	Orkney No. 244	February 1, 1928	16,280	16,343	−0.4%	36.19	13.97	449.8	1,165
Total cities	—	—	689,475	656,168	+5.1%	776.63	299.86	887.8	2,299

== Yukon ==
As in the other two Canadian territories, the only incorporated city in the Yukon is its capital, Whitehorse. Dawson was also previously incorporated as a city, but when the criteria were changed in the 1980s, its status was reduced to that of a town due to population. Through special provision, however, it was officially the town of the city of Dawson until 2001.

Name	Population (2021)	Population (2016)	Change (%)	Area (km^{2})	Population density
Whitehorse	28,201	25,085	+12.4%	413.94	68.1

== See also ==
- History of cities in Canada
- List of the largest cities and towns in Canada by area
- List of the largest municipalities in Canada by population
- List of Canada city name etymologies
- List of cities and towns of Upper Canada
- List of cities in North America
- List of city nicknames and slogans in Canada
- List of largest Canadian cities by census
- List of towns in Canada
- List of villages in Canada
