= Postal codes in Canada =

In Canada, a postal code (French: code postal) is an alphanumeric designation based on geography that is necessary in forming a complete postal address.. Canada Post developed and maintains the system on a national basis.

Postal codes by province and territory

Canadian postal codes follow the format A1A 1A1, where A is a letter and 1 is a digit, with a space separating the third and fourth characters. In writing out the postal address for a location within Canada, the postal code is inserted into the address block following the name of city and abbreviation for the province or territory.

The first three characters, or forward sortation area (FSA), correspond to a geographic area that can range in size from a dense urban neighbourhood to an expansive rural area, while the final three characters, or local delivery unit (LDU), corresponds to a subset of each FSA that could be an entire small town or a particular office building. As of October 2019, there were 876,445 postal codes, using FSAs from A0A in Newfoundland to Y1A in Yukon.

Canada Post is explicit in that exactly one space is to be used in formatting a postal code.

"Print the postal code in uppercase with the first three characters separated from the last three by one space. Don’t use hyphens."

As such, from a computing perspective, the string contains strictly 7 characters.

== History ==
=== City postal zones ===
Numbered postal zones were first used in Toronto in 1925. Mail to a Toronto address in zone 5 would be addressed in this format:

37 Bloor Street West
Toronto 5, Ontario

As of 1943, Toronto was divided into 14 zones, numbered from 1 to 15, except that 7 and 11 were unused, and there was a 2B zone.

Postal zones were implemented in Montreal in 1944.

By the early 1960s, other cities in Canada had been divided into postal zones, including Quebec, Ottawa, Winnipeg, and Vancouver as well as Toronto and Montreal. For example, an address in Vancouver would be addressed as:

804 Robson Street
Vancouver 1, B.C.

In the late 1960s, however, the Post Office began implementing a three-digit zone number scheme in major cities to replace existing one- and two-digit zone numbers, starting in Montreal, Toronto, and Vancouver. For example, an address in Metropolitan Toronto would be addressed as:

1253 Bay Street
Toronto 185, Ontario

Toronto's renumbering took effect 1 May 1969, accompanied by an advertising campaign under the slogan "Your number is up". However, with impending plans for a national postal code system, then‍–‍Postmaster General Eric Kierans announced that the Post Office would begin cancelling the new three-digit city zone system. Companies had changed their mail addressing at their own expense, only to find that the new zoning would prove to be short-lived.

=== Planning ===
As the largest Canadian cities grew in the 1950s and 1960s, the volume of mail passing through the country's postal system also grew, to billions of items by the 1950s and tens of billions of items by the mid-1960s. Consequently, it became progressively more difficult for employees who handsorted mail to memorize and keep track of all the individual letter-carrier routes within each city. New technology that allowed mail to be delivered faster also contributed to the pressure for these employees to sort the mail properly.

A report tabled in the House of Commons in 1969 dealt with the expected impact of "environmental change" on the Post Office operations over the following 25 years. A key recommendation was the "establishment of a task force to determine the nature of the automation and mechanization the Post Office should adopt, which might include design of a postal code".

In December 1969, Communications Minister Eric Kierans announced that a six-character postal code would be introduced, superseding the three-digit zone system. He later tabled a report in February 1970, entitled "A Canadian Public Address Postal Coding System", submitted by the firm of Samson, Belair, Simpson, Riddell Inc.

=== Implementation ===
Canada was one of the last Western countries to implement a nationwide postal code system. The introduction of the postal code began with a test in Ottawa on 1 April 1971. Coding of Ottawa was followed by a provincial-level rollout of the system in Manitoba, and the system was gradually implemented in the rest of the country from 1972 to 1974, although the nationwide use of the code by the end of 1974 was only 38.2 per cent.

The introduction of such a code system allowed Canada Post to easily speed up and simplify the flow of mail in the country, with sorting machines being able to handle 26,640 objects an hour.

The Canadian Union of Postal Workers objected to the automated sorting system, mainly because the wages for those who ran the new automated machines were much lower than for those who had hand-sorted mail. The unions ended up staging job action and public information campaigns, with the message that they did not want people or businesses to use postal codes on their mail. The union declared 20 March 1975 to be National "Boycott the Postal Code" Day, also demanding a reduction in the work week from 40 to 30 hours. The boycott was called off in February 1976 after a new collective agreement was signed with the CUPW.

One 1975 advertisement in the Toronto magazine Byliner generated controversy by showing a man writing a postal code on the bottom of a thonged woman with the following ditty:

"We're not 'stringing' you along,
Use postal codes – you'll 'thing' our 'thong',
Don't be cheeky – you've all got 'em
Please include them on the bottom."

The advertisement was denounced as "sexist garbage" in the House of Commons by NDP MP John Rodriguez, prompting an apology from Postmaster General Bryce Mackasey.

== Components of a postal code ==
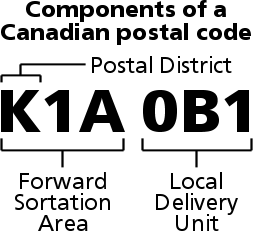

=== Forward sortation areas ===
A forward sortation area (FSA) is a geographical region in which all postal codes start with the same three characters.

The first letter of an FSA code denotes a particular "postal district", which, outside Quebec and Ontario, corresponds to an entire province or territory. The large populations of both Quebec and Ontario cause both provinces to be subdivided, into three and five postal districts respectively, and each has at least one urban area so populous that it has a dedicated postal district (H for the Montreal region, and M for Toronto). On the other hand, the low populations in Nunavut and the Northwest Territories (NWT) mean that even though Nunavut separated from the Northwest Territories and became its own territory in 1999, the two continue to share a postal district, X.

The digit identifies the FSA as urban or rural. A zero indicates a wide-area rural region (or, in rare instances, a special-purpose code); all other digits indicate urban areas.

The second letter represents a specific rural region, an entire medium-sized city, or a section of a major metropolitan area. In the extreme case, some FSAs in downtown Toronto, Montreal, and Vancouver are assigned to individual buildings. Rural FSAs also vary widely in population and area, with the Northwest Territories' X0G covering only the hamlet of Fort Liard, but adjoining X0E covering every other community in the territory except Yellowknife.

=== Table of all postal codes ===
A directory of FSAs is provided below, divided into separate articles by postal district. Individual FSA lists are in a tabular format, with the numbers (known as zones) going across the table and the second letter going down the table.

The FSA lists specify all communities covered by each rural FSA. Medium-sized cities may have one dedicated FSA; larger cities have more than one FSA within their limits.

For FSAs spanning more than one city, the city which is allocated the most codes in each such FSA is listed. For cities with a small number of FSAs (but more than one), the lists specify the relative location of each FSA in those cities. For cities with a large number of FSAs, applicable neighbourhoods and boroughs are specified.

All Canadian postal codes are listed in the following links, organized by first letter.

=== Local delivery units ===
The last three characters denote a local delivery unit (LDU). An LDU denotes a specific single address or range of addresses, which can correspond to an entire small town, a significant part of a medium-sized town, a single side of a city block in larger cities, a single large building or a portion of a very large one, a single (large) institution such as a university or a hospital, or a business that regularly receives large volumes of mail.

LDUs ending in zero correspond to postal facilities, from post offices and small franchised retail postal outlets all the way up to sortation plants. In urban areas, LDUs may be specific postal carriers' routes. In rural areas where direct door-to-door delivery is not available, an LDU can describe a set of post office boxes or a rural route. LDU 9Z9 is used exclusively for Business Reply Mail. In rural FSAs, the first two characters are usually assigned in alphanumerical order by the name of each community.

LDU 9Z0 refers to large regional distribution facilities, and is also used as a placeholder, appearing in some regional postmarks such as the "K0H 9Z0" which formerly appeared on purely local mail within the Kingston, Ontario, area.

== Number of possible postal codes ==
Postal codes use twenty uppercase letters of the English alphabet; they do not include the letters D, F, I, O, Q, or U. The first position also does not make use of the letters W or Z. This means the maximum number of FSAs available is 18×10×20 = 3,600. With 10×20×10 = 2,000 possible LDUs in each FSA, there is a theoretical limit of 7.2 million postal codes. The practical limit is a bit lower, as Canada Post reserves some FSAs for special functions, such as for test or promotional purposes (e.g., the H0H 0H0 for Santa Claus; see below), as well as for sorting mail bound for destinations outside Canada. The current Statistics Canada estimate of over 830,000 active postal codes represents about 12% of the entire postal code "space", leaving ample room for expansion. There is less room with regard to FSAs, however; for example, as of 2024, only three FSAs remain unused in British Columbia: V3P, V4H, and V4J.

== Urbanization ==
"Urbanization" is the name Canada Post uses to refer to the process where it replaces a rural postal code (a code with a zero as its second character) with urban postal codes. The vacated rural postal code can then be assigned to another community or retired. Canada Post decides when to urbanize a certain community after its population reaches a certain level, though different factors may also be involved.

For example, in early 2008, the postal code G0N 3M0 (covering Sainte-Catherine-de-la-Jacques-Cartier, Fossambault-sur-le-Lac, and Lac-Saint-Joseph, Quebec) was urbanized to postal codes beginning with G3N to remove ambiguities and confusions caused by similar street names. Unique among province-wide districts, New Brunswick (postal district E) is completely urbanized, its rural codes having been phased out.

== Identifying postal codes ==
Canada Post provides a postal code look-up tool on its website and via its mobile application, and sells hard-copy directories and CD-ROMs. Many vendors also sell validation tools, which allow customers to properly match addresses and postal codes. Hard-copy directories can also be consulted in all post offices, and some libraries.

== Letters to Santa Claus ==
In 1974, staff at a Canada Post office in Montreal were noticing a considerable number of letters addressed to Santa Claus entering the postal system, and those letters were being treated as undeliverable. Since employees handling those letters did not want the writers (mostly young children) to be disappointed at the lack of response, they started answering the letters themselves.

The amount of mail sent to Santa Claus increased every Christmas, to the point that Canada Post established an official Santa Claus letter-response program in 1983. By 2011, Santa's mail was being handled with the assistance of 11,000 volunteers, mostly current or former postal workers, at multiple locations across Canada, devoting an average of 21 hours each to this seasonal task.

Approximately 1,000,000 letters are addressed to Santa Claus each Christmas, including some originating outside Canada, and all of them are answered in the same language in which they are written. Canada Post introduced a special address for mail to Santa Claus, complete with its own postal code:

SANTA CLAUS
NORTH POLE  H0H 0H0
CANADA

In French, Santa's name Père Noël translates as "Father Christmas", and mail is addressed to:

PÈRE NOËL
PÔLE NORD  H0H 0H0
CANADA

The postal code H0H 0H0 was chosen for this special seasonal use, as it reads "Ho ho ho" if each zero is interpreted as the similar-looking letter O.

The H0- prefix is an anomaly: the 0 indicates a rural delivery zone, but H is used to designate Montreal, the second-largest city in Canada. As such, the H0- prefix is almost completely empty. H0M, assigned to the international Akwesasne tribal reserve on the Canada–US border, is the only other H0- postal code in active use.

In 2013, Santa was dragged into the ongoing Arctic sovereignty debate to support Canadian territorial claims extending to the North Pole. During a parliamentary debate, Conservative MP Paul Calandra accused the opposition Liberal Party of "not think[ing] that the North Pole or Santa Claus [is] in Canada". Liberal leader Justin Trudeau responded by saying, "Everyone knows that Santa Claus is Canadian. His postal code is H0H 0H0." The New Democratic Party disagreed, insisting that Santa is a "citizen of the world".

== Transition points to the Canadian Forces Postal Service ==
For transition of mail from the civilian to the Canadian Forces Postal Service, the postal codes of the three military post offices on Canadian soil are used, depending on the final destination.

- V9A 7N2 (BC): the Fleet Mail Offices (FMO) in Victoria
- B3K 5X5 (NS): FMO in Halifax
- K8N 5W6 (ON): the Canadian Forces Post Office (CFPO) in Belleville

These postal codes each represent a number of military post offices abroad, which are specified not by postal code but by CFPO or FMO number. The LDUs in this case correspond not so much to physical as to virtual delivery units, since mail is not delivered locally but is forwarded to the actual delivery points at Canadian military bases and ships abroad.

For example:

Name
Slot #
PO Box 5053 Stn Forces
Belleville ON  K8N 5W6
CANADA

In this example, Canada Post will deliver to the CFPO at Belleville, and the Canadian Forces Postal System will continue transport to the addressee at CFPO 5053 (in Geilenkirchen, Germany) by whatever means and timing the military will deem appropriate.

== Alternative uses ==
Postal codes can be correlated with databased information from censuses or health registries to create a geographic profile of an area's population. For instance, postal codes have been used to compare children's risk of developing cancer.

As Canadian electoral districts frequently follow postal code areas, citizens can identify their local elected representative using their postal code. Provincial and federal government websites offer an online "look-up" feature based on postal codes. Although A1A 1A1 is sometimes displayed as a generic code for this purpose, it is actually a genuine postal code in use in the Lower Battery, St. John's Harbour, Newfoundland. Another common "example" code in Canada Post materials, K1A 0B1, is the valid code for the Canada Post headquarters building in Ottawa.

== See also ==
- Canadian postal abbreviations for provinces and territories
- Geocoding
- List of postal codes in Canada
- ISO 3166-2:CA
