= Exclusive economic zone of Canada =

Economic zone exclusive to Canada

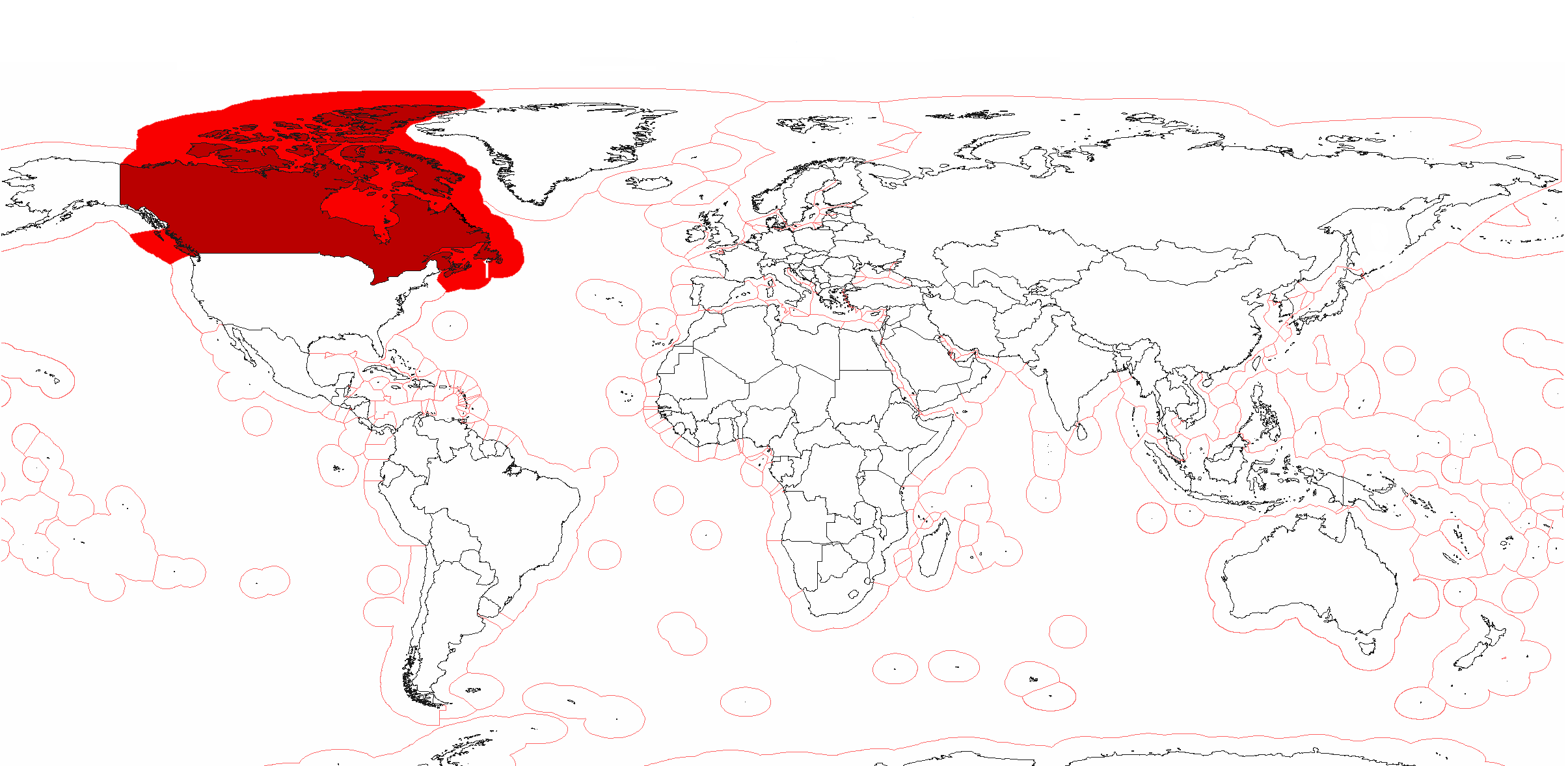
Canada's exclusive economic zone and territorial waters

The exclusive economic zone of Canada is the area of the sea in which Canada has special rights regarding the exploration and use of marine resources, as prescribed by the 1982 United Nations Convention on the Law of the Sea.

Canada's exclusive economic zone (EEZ) is the 7th-largest in the world. It is unusual in that its EEZ, covering 5,599,077 km^{2} (2,161,816 sq mi), is slightly smaller than its territorial waters. The latter generally extend only 12 nautical miles from the shore, but also include inland marine waters such as Hudson Bay—about 300 nautical miles (560 km; 350 mi) across—the Gulf of Saint Lawrence, and the internal waters of the Arctic archipelago.

== Geography ==
Canada's EEZ is in the Pacific Ocean, Beaufort Sea, Arctic Ocean, Baffin Bay, Hudson Bay, Labrador Sea, Northwestern Passages, Gulf of St Lawrence, and the Atlantic Ocean. It borders with Alaska (US) to the west, Greenland to the east, and the United States to the south.

The fishing grounds in Canada's Atlantic Ocean zone are called the "Grand Banks". They extend beyond 200 nautical miles (370 km; 230 mi) in the northern area called the "Nose" and the southern area called the "Tail" of the Grand Banks. The fish habitat outside 200 nmi encompasses 327,000 square nautical miles (1,120,000 km^{2}; 433,000 sq mi), compared to 673,000 sq nmi (2,310,000 km^{2}; 891,000 sq mi) landwards in the limited area.

== Marine life ==
The 200-nautical-mile zone is commercially important. Globally, in 1973, 90% of the world's fish were caught within this zone.

There are issues with how to manage straddling and migratory fish stocks which are vulnerable for high seas fisheries that operate outside the EEZ. The increase in fish catches within the EEZ and outside cause overfishing and decline of major stock levels. Fish catches by foreign fleets outside Canada's EEZ became a significant problem during the 1980s and 1990s. International agreements were made with most fishing states which placed moratoriums on nearly all traditional Fish stocks. In the mid-1990s a conflict arose about a specific stock between Canada and the European Union. Canadian authorities arrested a vessel from the European Union in the mid-1990s. There was a Canadian initiative to resolve this global problem which gained enough support from other countries for another United Nations Conference. This resulted in a United Nations Convention to straddle the highly migratory fish stocks. It was adopted in 1995, but requires 30 ratifications to be enforced. Another problem is salmon are not protected by UNCLOS from competitive fishing while the salmon migrates through the rivers and lakes of different coastal states to their spawning grounds. In some areas the issue of foreign fleets maximizing their catches on the high seas was replaced by coastal fisheries trying to do the same. There is a need for the implementation of effective policies to manage fisheries.

== History ==
In 1945, there were two United States presidential proclamations called the "Truman Proclamations". One was about how to manage the continental shelf and the other about fisheries. This caused a fast erosion of the concept "freedom of the seas" (all countries can freely use the oceans for navigation and fishing). Thereafter, many countries claimed resource rights with a maximum of 200 nautical miles.

The Canadian coastal areas in the Pacific and Atlantic contain among the richest fish resources in the world. In 1973 Canada's east coast territorial sea and fishing zones was 70,600 mi^{2} (183,000 km^{2}). Thanks to the extension to 200 nautical miles it increased to 673,000 mi^{2} (1,740,000 km^{2}). This encompassed 96% of the total fish catch by Canadian and foreign fishing fleets in the Atlantic zone of Canada. The marine life and natural resources in the Atlantic zone of Canada caused many foreign fishing vessels to exploit it. Since 1958 there was a dramatic increase of vessels from East Europe who joined West Europeans while the Canadian fishing fleet remained a stable size.

The Canadian and foreign fish catches were in danger due to significant stock declines since the early '70s. The International Commission for the Northwest Atlantic Fisheries (ICNAF) which existed since the 1940s could not prevent the rapid decline of fish stock.

In 1973, Canada participated in the Third United Nations Conference on the Law of the Sea. UNCLOS became effective since 16 November 1982. The Exclusive Economic Zone section of UNCLOS is described in Part V. It provides a "comprehensive framework for contemporary uses of the sea." It is the result of 15 years of negotiations which were initiated by the United Nations Seabed Committee and then at UNCLOS III.

Before the 200 nautical mile limit was accepted only 4% of the fish catch occurred outside the limit off Canada's Atlantic coast by Canadian and all foreign fleets.

In the Pacific, the Canadian territorial sea and fishing zones expanded from 46,600 mi^{2} (121,000 km^{2}) to 135,546 mi^{2} (351,060 km^{2}).

The EEZ encompass all waters seaward of the territorial sea limits to a distance of 200 nautical miles. All countries still have numerous high seas rights for transit and communication. In 1994, the Convention was adopted after the deposit of the minimum 60 ratifications.

== Disputes ==
=== Active ===
- A wedge-shaped section of the Beaufort Sea is disputed between Canada and the United States, because the area reportedly contains substantial oil reserves.
- France boasts some of Canada's EEZ at Saint Pierre and Miquelon, based on a new definition of the continental shelf and the exclusive economic zone between the two countries. Saint Pierre and Miquelon is entirely surrounded by Canada's EEZ.

=== Resolved ===
In 1992, the Canada–France Maritime Boundary Case, which centered on the EEZ around the French islands of Saint Pierre and Miquelon, was decided by an arbitral tribunal which concurred on the whole with the arguments put forth by Canada. France was awarded 18% of the area it had originally claimed.

== See also ==
- Borders of Canada
- Geography of Canada
- Islands of Canada
- Exclusive economic zone#Canada
