= Sept-Rivières—Caniapiscau =

- Census division
- Interactive map of Sept-Rivières—Caniapiscau
- Coordinates: 51°53′30″N 68°09′55″W
- Country: Canada
- Province: Quebec
- Region: Côte-Nord

Area
  - Land: 100,858.53 km^{2} (38,941.70 sq mi)

Population (2021)
  - Total: 38,240
  - Density: 0.4/km^{2} (1.0/sq mi)
  - Pop (2016–21): ▼2.8%
  - Dwellings: 19,507
- Time zone: UTC−5 (EST)
  - Summer (DST): UTC−4 (EDT)
- Area codes: 418 and 581

Sept-Rivières—Caniapiscau is a census division (CD) of Quebec, with geographical code 97. It consists of the regional county municipalities of Sept-Rivières and Caniapiscau.

The division had a population of 38,240 in the Canada 2021 Census. Of that total, 24,569 people, 64 per cent of the division's entire population, reside in the city of Sept-Îles.

== Geographic hierarchy ==
Census Code	S or C?	Name	Type	Population 2011	Population 2006	Total dwellings	Dwellings usual res.	Land Area
2497908	C	Caniapiscau	NO	0	0	0	0	34057.11
2497035	C	Fermont	V	2874	2633	1389	1221	470.67
2497806	c	Kawawachikamach	TK	586	569	169	149	30.83
2497810	c	Lac-John	IRI	21	16	12	10	0.62
2497912	C	Lac-Juillet	NO	26	0	5	5	3030.78
2497914	C	Lac-Vacher	NO	0	0	0	0	475.85
2497904	S	Lac-Walker	NO	102	128	59	44	17683.30
2497804	s	Maliotenam	IRI	1316	1123	445	431	5.17
2497808	c	Matimekosh	IRI	540	528	200	169	0.74
2497022	S	Port-Cartier	V	6651	6758	3093	2879	1101.31
2497906	C	Rivière-Mouchalagane	NO	0	0	0	0	32297.67
2497902	S	Rivière-Nipissis	NO	0	0	1	0	9914.04
2497040	C	Schefferville	V	213	202	178	110	25.11
2497007	S	Sept-Îles	V	25686	25514	12029	11221	1764.13
2497802	s	Uashat	IRI	1485	1190	438	421	1.22
		Sept-Rivières—Caniapiscau	CD	39500	38661	18018	16660	100858.53
	S/s	Sept-Rivières	MRC	35240	34713	16065	14996	30469.17
	C/c	Caniapiscau	MRC	4260	3948	1953	1664	70389.38

In the second column:

- S = belongs to Sept-Rivières RCM juridically
- s = belongs to Sept-Rivières RCM geographically
- C = belongs to Caniapiscau RCM juridically
- c = belongs to Caniapiscau RCM geographically

In the rightmost column, summed up area adds up to 100858.55 rather than the correct 100858.53 due to rounding error.
