= Louise de La Fayette (jurist) =

Canadian expert in the law of the sea and jurist (1948–2009)

Louise Angélique de La Fayette (1948 – 27 November 2009) was a Canadian expert in the law of the sea who worked for the Canadian government, the University of Southampton, and the United Nations. She was known for her expertise on marine environmental law, on international nuclear law, and on the operations of the International Maritime Organization, and she became "one of the foremost legal authorities on maritime matters and liability for environmental damage".

== Education ==
De La Fayette was born in Toronto in 1948, the daughter of Balkan immigrants to Canada. She was a student of literature at Trinity College, Toronto, part of the University of Toronto, and remained at the University of Toronto for an M.A. in drama. However, after beginning doctoral research on Shakespeare, she instead decided to become a lawyer. In 1985, she earned an LL.M. at Queens' College, Cambridge.

== Career ==
After finishing her master's degree at Toronto, de La Fayette came to work for the Canadian Department of Foreign Affairs and Trade. During this time, she worked on the case on Delimitation of the Maritime Boundary in the Gulf of Maine Area (commonly known as the Gulf of Maine Case), the Fisheries Jurisdiction Case between Spain and Canada, and on the Canada–France Maritime Boundary Case. She also spent a year visiting the Organisation for Economic Co-operation and Development.

After teaching for a year at the University of Glasgow, de La Fayette took a readership in 1996 in international law at the University of Southampton, also becoming director of the Centre for Environmental Law at Southampton.

While at Southampton, de La Fayette represented the International Union for Conservation of Nature pro bono at the International Maritime Organization. In 2002 she moved to the United Nations Department of Ocean Affairs and Law of the Sea. She retired in 2006.
