= Borders of Canada =

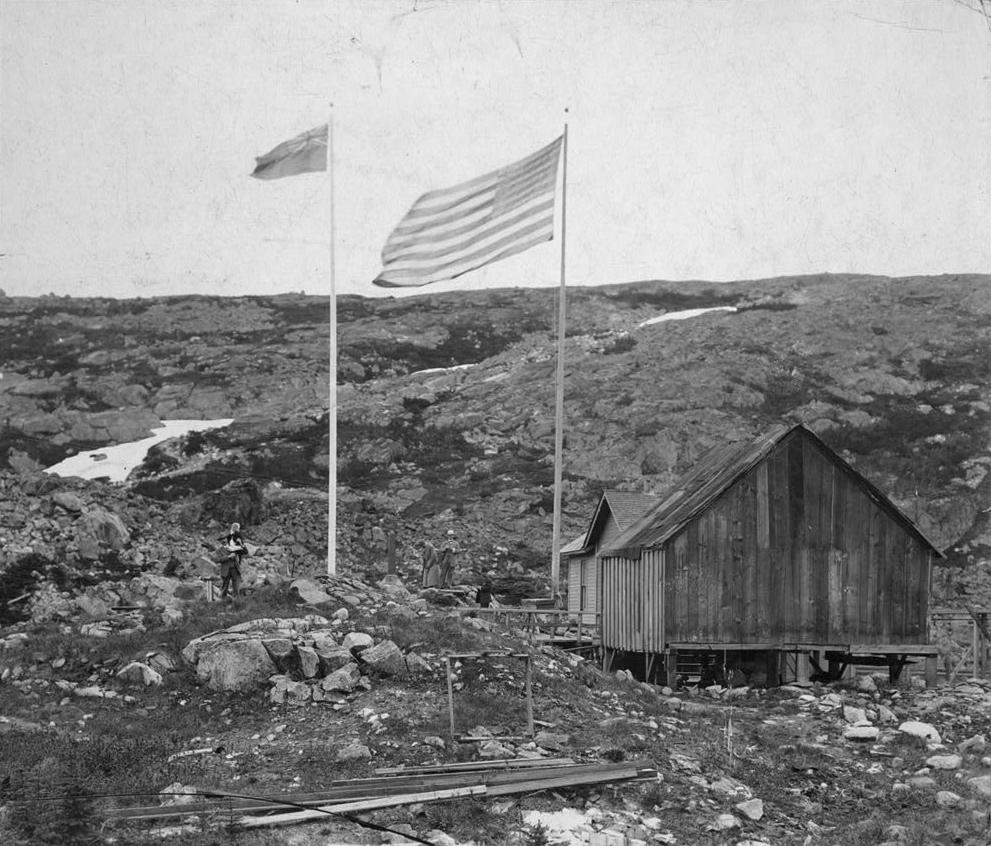
The international border between Canada and the United States, with Yukon on one side and Alaska on the other, circa 1900-1923

The borders of Canada include:

- To the south and west: An international boundary with the United States, forming the longest shared border in the world, 8,893 km (5,526 mi); (Informally referred as the 49th parallel north which makes up the boundary at parts.
- To the east: A maritime boundary with the Kingdom of Denmark, at the self-autonomous territory of Greenland; and a smaller land-based border on divided Hans Island.
- To the southeast: A short maritime border with France, at the overseas islands of Saint Pierre and Miquelon.
- To the north: The far northern situated areas of the Queen Elizabeth Islands extend well into the Arctic and form portions of the basis of historical Canadian sovereignty claims into the Arctic region. More recent Canadian claims (as of 2022) reportedly extend to a portion of the Russian Federation.

== See also ==
- Geography of Canada
- Arctic Council
- Arctic cooperation and politics
- Canada–United States relations
  - List of areas disputed by Canada and the United States
- Exclusive economic zone of Canada
- Canada–France Maritime Boundary Case
- Territorial claims in the Arctic
- Border irregularities of Canada
