= Oscar Schachter =

Oscar Schachter (June 19, 1915 - December 13, 2003) was an American international law and diplomacy professor, and United Nations aide.

Schachter was a native of New York City, graduated Phi Beta Kappa from City College of New York in 1936, and from Columbia Law School, where he was a James Kent Scholar and first in his class of 1939. He was in private practice and worked for other federal offices before joining the United States Department of State in 1942 as an advisor on wartime economic controls and liberated European areas.

He was a counsel for the United Nations Relief and Rehabilitation Administration beginning in 1944 and was sent on missions to Poland and Russia in 1945. In 1946, he joined the United Nations as a legal counselor and later served in various directorial capacities.

Schachter was a guest lecturer at Yale Law School from 1955 to 1971. He was appointed a professor at Columbia Law School in the faculty of international affairs in 1975, named Hamilton Fish professor in 1980, and given emeritus status in 1985. He taught at Columbia until 2003.

He was a fellow of the American Academy of Arts and Sciences, a member of the Council on Foreign Relations, and a past president of the American Society of International Law.

According to Kofi Annan, former Secretary-General of the United Nations, "Professor Schachter did more than any other official of the United Nations to help shape the rule of law."

He was one of the three neutral arbitrators who rendered the decision in the 1992 Canada–France Maritime Boundary Case.

== Selected works ==
- Schachter, Oscar, “ Philip Jessup’s Life and Ideas”

Published online by Cambridge University Press: 27 February 2017

- Schachter, Oscar, The role of international law in the practice of the United Nations, c.1950
- Schachter, Oscar, Who Owns the Universe?, Collier's, early 1950s
- Schachter, Oscar, The relation of law, politics and action in the United Nations, 1960
- Schachter, Oscar; et al., Toward wider acceptance of UN treaties, New York : Arno Press, 1971. ISBN 0-405-02236-0
- Schachter, Oscar, Sharing the world’s resources, New York : Columbia University Press, 1977. ISBN 0-231-04110-1
- Schachter, Oscar; Hellawell, Robert, Competition in international business : law and policy on restrictive practices, New York : Columbia University Press, 1981. ISBN 0-231-05220-0
- Schachter, Oscar, International law in theory and practice, Dordrecht, The Netherlands; Boston : M. Nijhoff Publishers; Norwell, MA, U.S.A. : Sold and distributed in the U.S.A. and Canada by Kluwer Academic Publishers, 1991. ISBN 0-7923-1024-1
- Schachter, Oscar; Joyner, Christopher C., (editors), United Nations legal order, Cambridge : Cambridge University Press; [s.l.] : ASIL, 2 volumes, 1995. ISBN 0-521-46522-2
- Schachter, Oscar. "The right of states to use armed force." Michigan Law Review 82.5/6 (1984): 1620-1646.
- Schachter, Oscar. "United Nations law in the Gulf conflict." The American Journal of International Law 85.3 (1991): 452-473.
