= Canadian postal abbreviations for provinces and territories =

Canadian provincial and territorial postal abbreviations are used by Canada Post in a code system consisting of two capital letters, to represent each of the 13 provinces and territories on addressed mail. These abbreviations allow automated sorting.

ISO 3166-2:CA identifiers' second elements are all the same as these; ISO adopted the existing Canada Post abbreviations.

These abbreviations are not the source of letters in Canadian postal codes, which are assigned by Canada Post on a different basis than these abbreviations. While postal codes are also used for sorting, they allow extensive regional sorting. In addition, several provinces have postal codes that begin with different letters.

The codes replaced the inconsistent traditional system used by Canadians until the 1990s. Apart from the postal abbreviations, there are no officially designated traditional (or standard) abbreviations for the provinces. Natural Resources Canada, however, maintains a list of such abbreviations which are recommended for "general purpose use" and are also used in other official contexts, such as the census conducted by Statistics Canada. Some of the French versions included a hyphen. Nunavut (created in 1999) does not have a designated abbreviation because it did not exist when these codes were phased out, though some can be found in other official works.

== Names and abbreviations ==
Province or Territory	Postal and ISO 3166‑2:CA abbreviation	Traditional abbreviation (English)	Traditional abbreviation (French)	Notes
Alberta	AB	Alta.	Alb.	
British Columbia	BC	B.C.	C.-B.	C.-B. is short for Colombie-Britannique
Manitoba	MB	Man.	Man.	
New Brunswick	NB	N.B.	N.-B.	N.-B. is short for Nouveau-Brunswick.
Newfoundland and Labrador	NL	Nfld., Lab. N.L.	T.-N.-L.	Previously Nfld. and T.-N. for Newfoundland before the change of name of the province occurred on December 6, 2001. T.-N. is short for Terre-Neuve. T.-N.-L. is short for Terre-Neuve-et-Labrador. NF was the two-letter abbreviation used before the province's name changed to Newfoundland and Labrador. LB was commonly used for Labrador—the mainland part of the province—prior to 2002. It was an official code available for optional use in lieu of NF and was listed in the Canada Postal Guide.
Northwest Territories	NT	N.W.T.	T.N.-O.	T.N.-O. is short for Territoires du Nord-Ouest.
Nova Scotia	NS	N.S.	N.-É.	N.-É. is short for Nouvelle-Écosse.
Nunavut	NU	Nvt.	Nt	These traditional abbreviations are not listed by Natural Resources Canada and TERMIUM Plus, both of which only used NU.
Ontario	ON	Ont.	Ont.	O. was not uncommon in the late 19th and early 20th centuries for either Ontario or Ohio. An assumption of intranational context was often the only disambiguating factor in that era.
Prince Edward Island	PE	P.E.I.	Î.-P.-É.	Î.-P.-É. is short for Île du Prince-Édouard.
Quebec	QC	Que.	Qc	Also P.Q. is unofficially used, short for Province de Québec. Later, PQ evolved from P.Q. as the first two-letter non-punctuated abbreviation. Later still, QC evolved as the second two-letter non-punctuated abbreviation, making Quebec's abbreviation consistent with other provinces insofar as using letters solely from the name of the province, but not the word "province", as PQ did. Also to distinguish PQ: Province de Québec from PQ: Parti Québécois (the political party).
Saskatchewan	SK	Sask.	Sask.	
Yukon	YT	Yuk.	Yn	YK is common but not official. It is used as the second-level country code domain (.yk.ca). ISO-3166-2 lists YT as official.

== Choice of letters ==
The sources of the postal abbreviations vary. Some are from the initials of two of the words in the name of a province or territory, while others are from the first and final letter or from the first and some other letter in the name. All of these names are based on the English form of the name, though they also correspond to their French equivalents in various ways (for example, NT could be read for the first and last letters of Nord-Ouest, instead of Northwest Territories). For Quebec and New Brunswick, the two provinces with large numbers of French speakers, the initials in both languages are identical. French equivalents of each abbreviation once existed: see Traditional abbreviations.

=== Avoidance of naming overlaps with U.S. ===
These abbreviations are fully compatible with the equivalent two-letter codes used for states and territorial areas of the United States, because no abbreviations overlap. The policy of not overlapping adjacent-country abbreviations, which helps the postal processing system avoid dealing with naming collisions, precludes use of NV for Nunavut (compare NV for Nevada) and TN for Terre-Neuve/Terra Nova/Newfoundland (compare TN for Tennessee). Manitoba's abbreviation, MB, is due to U.S. states already having abbreviations in all of the letters of the province's name besides "B". This policy later became a formal agreement between Canada Post and the USPS. The USPS changed the abbreviation for the U.S. state of Nebraska from NB to NE in November 1969 to avoid a conflict with New Brunswick.

The Canadian policy of adopting provincial abbreviations that did not overlap with the state abbreviations of adjacent countries differed from the situation in Mexico, where two-letter combinations for Mexican states were chosen by various competing commercial organizations (in the absence of any official Correos de México list) regardless of whether that combination was already in use in the United States or Canada, e.g., CO (Coahuila/Colorado), ME (Mexico/Maine), MI (Michoacán/Michigan), MO (Morelos/Missouri), NL (Nuevo León/Newfoundland and Labrador), and BC (Baja California/British Columbia).

ISO 3166-2, an international standard, offers an alternative with globally unique administrative division identifiers, whose division elements are all between one and three letters long. This is very useful for software and web development, although it may be moot for established postal systems. Its codes for Canada, the U.S., and Mexico are listed at ISO 3166-2:CA, ISO 3166-2:US, and ISO 3166-2:MX, respectively.

=== Changes over time ===
In 1991, the code for Quebec was changed from PQ to QC.

Nunavut's code became effective on 13 December 2000; before this date, but after Nunavut's creation on 1 April 1999, the abbreviation "NT" was used for Nunavut as well as the Northwest Territories. Canadian postal codes begin with "X" for both NT and NU, the only two territorial or provincial jurisdictions to share the same initial postal code letter. However, the new code NU was chosen to stem possible confusion and to reflect the new territory's creation.

On 21 October 2002, Newfoundland and Labrador's postal abbreviation was changed from NF to NL. This reflected the provincial name change from "Newfoundland" to "Newfoundland and Labrador" on 6 December 2001.

== Sample of a properly formatted address ==
Source: Canadian Addressing Guide

For domestic mail:

John Doe
27-1643 DUNDAS ST W
TORONTO ON M6K 1V2

For international mail:

Cristina Cruz
Apartado 3068
46807 Puerto Vallarta Jalisco
MEXICO

Note that the street type, unit type, and city quadrant, if applicable, are abbreviated, without periods (though using periods, or even spelling out every word in its entirety, is unlikely to affect delivery in any way). Note also, for domestic mail, the lack of a comma between municipality and province or territory, the double space between the latter and the postal code, and the single space between segments of postal code, all on one line. For domestic mail, this must be the last line of the address, while for international mail, it is followed by a final line giving only the unabbreviated country name. Addresses should be done in all-upper-case without punctuation, and the unit number may follow street number, with a suitable unit identifier, e.g., "1643 DUNDAS ST W APT 27" using the above example.

The last line of the address block area should include only the complete country name (no abbreviations) written in uppercase letters. Mail to the US often omits the country name, and vice versa, given that no postal codes nor provincial/territorial/state abbreviations duplicate one another. Foreign postal codes, if used, should be placed on the line above the destination country. The following shows the order of information for the destination address:

LINE 1: NAME OF ADDRESSEE
LINE 2: STREET ADDRESS OR POST OFFICE BOX NUMBER
LINE 3: CITY OR TOWN NAME, OTHER PRINCIPAL SUBDIVISION (such as PROVINCE, STATE, or COUNTRY) AND POSTAL CODE (IF KNOWN) (Note: in some countries, the postal code may precede the city or town name)
LINE 4: COUNTRY NAME (UPPERCASE LETTERS IN ENGLISH)

From the USPS IMM 122.1 Destination address
Within and to Canada, there must be two spaces between the province abbreviation and the postal code, as shown below between "ON" and "K1A 0B1":

MS HELEN SAUNDERS
1010 CLEAR STREET
OTTAWA ON K1A 0B1
