= Prosper Weil =

French lawyer (1926–2018)

Prosper Weil (21 September 1926 – 3 October 2018), was a French lawyer, professor emeritus of Panthéon-Assas University's law school and, since 1999, a member of the Institut de France's Académie des sciences morales et politiques.

== Life ==
Weil was born in Strasbourg. His doctoral thesis, titled Les conséquences de l’annulation d’un acte administratif pour excès de pouvoir, earned him the prix de thèse de la Faculté de droit de Paris.

Prosper Weil came first in the competitive agrégation exam for public law in 1952. He co-wrote the textbook Les grands arrêts de la jurisprudence administrative, as well as many books and articles in public international law, especially in maritime law. He was also an international arbitrator and counselor for the International Court of Justice at the Hague.

In 1992, Weil was the French representative on the arbitration panel that decided the Canada–France Maritime Boundary Case; Weil wrote a dissent from the panel's decision in the case. He was a member of the Permanent Court of Arbitration, the Institut de droit international, and was a member (1980–1999) and president (1989–1993) of the administrative tribunal of the World Bank.
