= ISO 3166-2:CA =

Entry for Canada in ISO 3166-2

ISO 3166-2:CA is the entry for Canada in ISO 3166-2, part of the ISO 3166 standard published by the International Organization for Standardization (ISO), which defines codes for the names of the principal subdivisions (e.g., provinces or states) of all countries coded in ISO 3166-1.

Currently for Canada, ISO 3166-2 codes are defined for ten provinces and three territories.

Each code consists of two parts, separated by a hyphen. The first part is CA, the ISO 3166-1 alpha-2 code of Canada. The second part is two letters, which is the postal abbreviation for the province or territory.

== Current codes ==
Subdivision names are listed as in the ISO 3166-2 standard published by the ISO 3166 Maintenance Agency (ISO 3166/MA).

ISO 639-1 codes are used to represent subdivision names in the official languages of Canada: English and French.

Map of Canada with each province or territory labelled with the second part of its ISO 3166-2 code.

Code	Subdivision name in English	Subdivision name in French	Subdivision category
CA-AB	Alberta	Alberta	Province
CA-BC	British Columbia	Colombie-Britannique	Province
CA-MB	Manitoba	Manitoba	Province
CA-NB	New Brunswick	Nouveau-Brunswick	Province
CA-NL	Newfoundland and Labrador	Terre-Neuve-et-Labrador	Province
CA-NT	Northwest Territories	Territoires du Nord-Ouest	Territory
CA-NS	Nova Scotia	Nouvelle-Écosse	Province
CA-NU	Nunavut	Nunavut	Territory
CA-ON	Ontario	Ontario	Province
CA-PE	Prince Edward Island	Île-du-Prince-Édouard	Province
CA-QC	Quebec	Québec	Province
CA-SK	Saskatchewan	Saskatchewan	Province
CA-YT	Yukon	Yukon	Territory

== Changes ==
The following changes to the entry have been announced in newsletters by the ISO 3166/MA since the first publication of ISO 3166-2 in 1998:

Newsletter	Date issued	Description of change in newsletter	Code/Subdivision change
Newsletter I-1	2000-06-21	Addition of 1 new territory	Subdivisions added: CA-NU Nunavut
Newsletter I-2	2002-05-21	Correction of name form of CA-NF	Codes: CA-NF Newfoundland → CA-NL Newfoundland and Labrador
Newsletter I-4	2002-12-10	Change of code element of Newfoundland and Labrador	Codes: CA-NF Newfoundland → CA-NL Newfoundland and Labrador
Online Browsing; Platform (OBP)	2014-10-29	Change spelling of CA-YT; update List Source	Name change: CA-YT Yukon Territory → Yukon

== See also ==
- Administrative divisions of Canada
- Geographical Names Board of Canada
- List of FIPS region codes (A–C)#CA:_Canada
- Neighbouring countries: GL, US
