= Lac-Juillet =

- Unorganized territory
- Location in Côte-Nord Region of Quebec
- Coordinates: 54°47′N 64°00′W
- Country: Canada
- Province: Quebec
- Region: Côte-Nord
- RCM: Caniapiscau
- Constituted: January 1, 1986

Government
  - Federal riding: Côte-Nord—Kawawachikamach—Nitassinan
  - Prov. riding: Duplessis

Area
  - Total: 3,595.81 km^{2} (1,388.35 sq mi)
  - Land: 2,865.50 km^{2} (1,106.38 sq mi)

Population (2021)
  - Total: 0
  - Density: 0/km^{2} (0/sq mi)
  - Pop (2016-21): N/A
  - Dwellings: 0
- Time zone: UTC−05:00 (EST)
  - Summer (DST): UTC−04:00 (EDT)
- Highways: No major routes

Lac-Juillet (French pronunciation: [lak ʒɥijɛ]) is an unorganized territory in the Côte-Nord region of Quebec, Canada, part of Caniapiscau Regional County Municipality.

The eponymous Lake Juillet (54°47′55″N 64°00′31″W) is located in the eastern part of the territory and was named after Blaise Juillet Avignon, a companion of Adam Dollard des Ormeaux, who drowned on April 19, 1660, near Nuns' Island.

== Demographics ==
Historical census populations – Lac-Juillet, Quebec

Year	Pop.	±%
1991	0	—
1996	0	0.00%
2001	0	0.00%
2006	0	0.00%

Year	Pop.	±%
2011	26	—
2016	0	−100.0%
2021	0	0.00%

Source: Statistics Canada
