= Lac-Vacher =

- Unorganized territory
- Location in Côte-Nord Region of Quebec
- Coordinates: 54°55′N 66°55′W
- Country: Canada
- Province: Quebec
- Region: Côte-Nord
- RCM: Caniapiscau
- Constituted: January 1, 1986

Government
  - Federal riding: Côte-Nord—Kawawachikamach—Nitassinan
  - Prov. riding: Duplessis

Area
  - Total: 550.51 km^{2} (212.55 sq mi)
  - Land: 454.03 km^{2} (175.30 sq mi)

Population (2021)
  - Total: 0
  - Density: 0/km^{2} (0/sq mi)
  - Pop (2016–21): N/A
  - Dwellings: 34
- Time zone: UTC−05:00 (EST)
  - Summer (DST): UTC−04:00 (EDT)
- Highways: No major routes

Lac-Vacher is an unorganized territory in the Côte-Nord region of Quebec, Canada, part of Caniapiscau Regional County Municipality.

It is named after Lake Vacher that is within the territory.

The Naskapi reserved land of Kawawachikamach is an enclave within the territory.

== Demographics ==
Historical census populations – Lac-Vacher, Quebec

| Year | Pop. | ±% |
|---|---|---|
| 1991 | 0 | — |
| 1996 | 0 | 0.00% |
| 2001 | 0 | 0.00% |
| 2006 | 0 | 0.00% |

| Year | Pop. | ±% |
|---|---|---|
| 2011 | 0 | 0.00% |
| 2016 | 0 | 0.00% |
| 2021 | 0 | 0.00% |

2021 Population figure based on amended count.
Source: Statistics Canada
