= Caniapiscau Regional County Municipality =

Caniapiscau
- Regional county municipality
- Coordinates: 52°47′N 67°05′W
- Country: Canada
- Province: Quebec
- Region: Côte-Nord
- Effective: January 1, 1982
- County seat: Fermont

Government
  - Type: Prefecture
  - Prefect: Martin St-Laurent

Area
  - Total: 80,398.08 km^{2} (31,041.87 sq mi)
  - Land: 64,936.44 km^{2} (25,072.10 sq mi)
- Total area excludes reserves

Population (2021)
  - Total: 3,838
  - Density: 0.1/km^{2} (0.26/sq mi)
  - Pop (2016–21): ▼1.1%
  - Dwellings: 2,263
- Includes reserves
- Time zone: UTC−5 (EST)
  - Summer (DST): UTC−4 (EDT)
- Area codes: 418 and 581
- Website: www.caniapiscau.net

Caniapiscau (French pronunciation: [kanjapisko]) is a regional county municipality in the Côte-Nord region of Quebec, Canada. The seat is Fermont.

The census groups Caniapiscau RCM with neighbouring Sept-Rivières into the single census division of Sept-Rivières—Caniapiscau. In the 2021 Canadian census, the combined population was 38,240. The population of Caniapiscau RCM itself was 3838, about two-thirds of whom live in its largest city of Fermont.

== Subdivisions ==
There are 6 subdivisions and 3 native reserves within the RCM:

Cities & Towns (2)

- Fermont
- Schefferville

Unorganized territories (4)

- Caniapiscau
- Lac-Juillet
- Lac-Vacher
- Rivière-Mouchalagane

Native Reserves (2)
(not associated with RCM)

- Lac-John
- Matimekosh

Naskapi Reserve (1)
(not associated with RCM)

- Kawawachikamach

== Demographics ==
Canada census – Caniapiscau RCM community profile

	2021
Population	3,838 (-1.1% from 2016)
Land area	64,936.44 km^{2} (25,072.10 sq mi)
Population density	0.1/km^{2} (0.26/sq mi)
Median age
Private dwellings	2,263 (total) 1,547 (occupied)
Median household income

Notes: 2021 Population figure based on amended count. Data includes the reserves.
References: 2021

Historical census populations – Caniapiscau RCM
Year	Pop.	±%
2011	4,260	—
2016	3,881	−8.9%
2021	3,838	−1.1%
Population figures based on revised counts. Data includes the reserves. Source: Statistics Canada

== Transportation ==
=== Access routes ===
Highways and numbered routes that run through the municipality, including external routes that start or finish at the county border:

- Autoroutes
  - None
- Principal Highways
  - None
- Secondary Highways
  - R-389
- External Routes
  - Route 500

== See also ==
- List of regional county municipalities and equivalent territories in Quebec
