= Canada–France Maritime Boundary Case =

1992 arbitration of Exclusive Economic Zone dispute

The boundaries of the 1992 EEZ arbitral decision between Canada and France following Canada's 1996 EEZ extension

The Canada–France Maritime Boundary Case was a dispute between Canada and France that was decided in 1992 by an arbitral tribunal created by the parties to resolve the dispute. The decision established the extent of the Exclusive Economic Zone of the French territory of Saint Pierre and Miquelon.

== Background ==
In 1972, Canada and France signed a treaty that delimited the territorial maritime boundary between Canada and the French territory of Saint Pierre and Miquelon. However, the maritime boundaries beyond the territorial sea (including extent of the Exclusive Economic Zones (EEZ) of both countries) continued to be disputed. The extent of each country's EEZ was significant because it would determine where the countries had an exclusive right to fish. Years of failed negotiations led Canada and France to agree in March 1989 to establish an ad hoc arbitral tribunal that would resolve the dispute.

== Arbitral tribunal ==
The arbitral tribunal was composed of five arbitrators—three neutral parties and one representative from each country. The neutral arbitrators were Eduardo Jiménez de Aréchaga of Uruguay (president), Gaetano Arangio-Ruiz of Italy, and Oscar Schachter of the United States. Canada's representative was Allan Gotlieb and France's was Prosper Weil.

== Decision ==
The arbitral tribunal issued its decision and award on 10 June 1992. It was a 3–2 decision, with the representatives of both Canada and France dissenting from the decision. The zone that was awarded to France was unusual and in two parts: first, the boundary was set at an equidistant line between the French islands and the Canadian island of Newfoundland. Added to this was a 24 nautical mile bulge on the west of the islands. Lastly, a long north–south 188-nautical-mile (348 km) corridor south of the islands was awarded to France, presumably to allow France access to its EEZ from international waters without having to pass through the Canadian EEZ. The corridor is narrow, being approximately 10½ nautical miles wide. The shape of the award has been likened to a keyhole, a mushroom, and a baguette.

The award was approximately 18% of the territory that France had initially been claiming.

== Criticism ==
Since the 1992 award, the decision has been criticised by both Canadian and French commentators as well as neutral observers, noting that a straightforward application of the Convention on the Law of the Sea would extend Canada's EEZ beyond the limits of the French corridor, a circumstance that was not intended by the arbitral tribunal. Indeed, in 1996, Canada unilaterally extended its EEZ using Sable Island as a base point, meaning that the French EEZ became entirely enveloped within Canada's EEZ.
