= Kathleen Fenwick =

Canadian curator

- Born: 17 June 1901; London, England
- Died: 28 September 1973 (aged 72)
- Known for: Curator of Prints and Drawings at the National Gallery of Canada from 1929 to 1968
- Awards: Order of Canada

Kathleen Mary Fenwick, OC (17 June 1901 – 28 September 1973) was Curator of Prints and Drawings at the National Gallery of Canada from 1929 until her retirement in 1968. She emigrated from the U.K. in 1928 to take up the assistant curator position but was quickly promoted. She had been educated at Goldsmith College of Art in London and the Academie Julian in Paris. She was the first female curator in Canada.

In 1968, she was made an Officer of the Order of Canada for being "largely responsible for developing the collection into one of the finest of its kind."
