= Treaty 4 =

Treaty between First Nations and Canadian Crown

Treaty No. 4 between Her Majesty the Queen and the Cree and Saulteaux Tribes of Indians at the Qu'Appelle and Fort Ellice
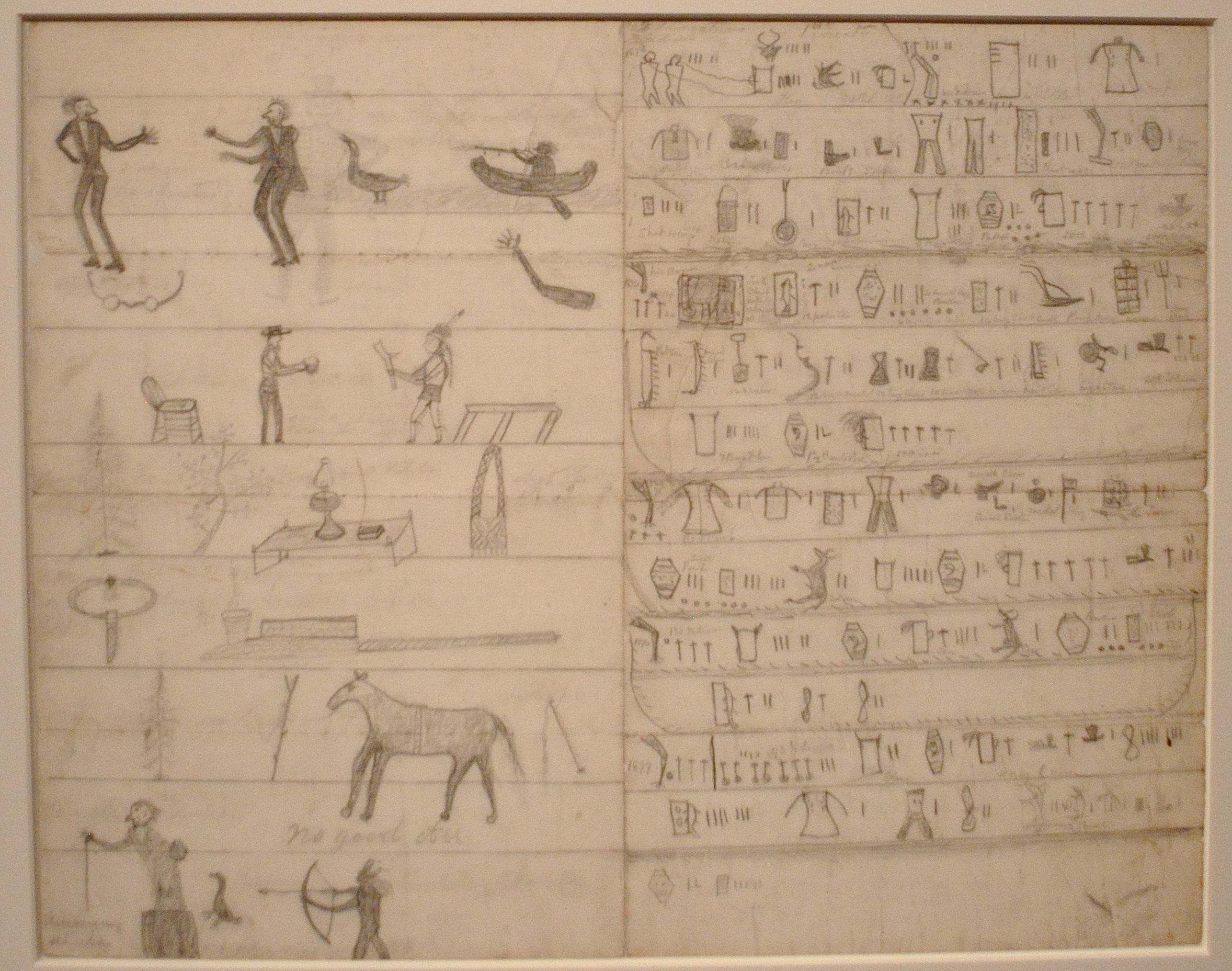
- Pictograph made by Chief Paskwa in 1874 describing Treaty 4
- Signed: 15–25 September 1874
- Location: Fort Qu'Appelle, Fort Ellice
- Parties: Canada; § List of Treaty 4 First Nations
- Language: English

Treaty 4 is a treaty established between Queen Victoria and the Cree and Saulteaux First Nation band governments. The area covered by Treaty 4 represents most of current day southern Saskatchewan, plus small portions of what are today western Manitoba and southeastern Alberta. This treaty is also called the Qu'Appelle Treaty, as its first signings were conducted at Fort Qu'Appelle, North-West Territories, on 15 September 1874. Additional signings or adhesions continued until September 1877. This treaty is the only Indigenous treaty in Canada that has a corresponding indigenous interpretation (a pictograph made at the time by Chief Paskwa).

== Reasons for the treaty ==
In 1870, Hudson's Bay Company sold Rupert's Land for £300,000 to the Dominion of Canada. The company's land covered the edge of the Rocky Mountains to the Great Lakes and was divided into the province of Manitoba and the North-West Territories. The Indigenous peoples whose traditional territories were sold were not included in the land transfer negotiations. After learning of the transaction, the Indigenous people demanded recognition and compensation.

The subsequent years, between 1871 and 1877, saw the first seven of the eleven numbered treaties signed by Canada and the Prairie First Nations. The government of Canada negotiated the first five Numbered Treaties to gain land from the First Nations for settlement, agricultural and industry. Also, Prime Minister John A. Macdonald saw the land as necessary to complete a transcontinental railway, which would run through the cities of Regina, Moose Jaw, and Swift Current in southern Saskatchewan. The Canadian Government feared that potential conflict with Indigenous people could disrupt the advancement in the west. Generally, the Indigenous people knew that change was inevitable because their natural food source was fading and settlers were arriving. They believed treaty negotiations would provide protection and resources. Both parties cooperated with the treaty negotiations.

== The making of the treaty ==
Treaty 4 was made on 15 September 1874, between select Cree, Saulteaux and Assiniboine Indigenous who lived in the specified area, and "her most Gracious Majesty the Queen of Great Britain and Ireland". However, decisions were made by the Canadian Prime Minister Alexander Mackenzie, his government and the treaty commissioners. The treaty was signed at Fort Qu’Appelle, which at the time was a Hudson's Bay Company outpost and is the cause for the nickname 'Qu’Appelle Treaty'. The land which is represented by the treaty is the south of contemporary Saskatchewan. Treaty 4 is the first of the numbered treaties in which First Nations adhered to the treaty after it had been determined and signed, therefore they had to accept the terms as is. The commissioners for Canada were: Alexander Morris, appointed as Lieutenant-Governor for Manitoba and the North-West Territories in 1872, who acted as the primary negotiator; David Laird, the Minister of the Interior; and William Christie, the Esquire of Brockville in Ontario. These men were selected by the Canadian government as representatives, but they stated that the Indigenous people were making a deal with the Queen herself. A number of Metis attended the Treaty negotiations as interpreters and signed Treaty 4 as witnesses. On 7 September 1876, the Metis at Fort Walsh submitted a petition to Inspector Walsh on behalf of the Metis of the four districts of Assiniboia to join Treaty 4, but their request was declined.

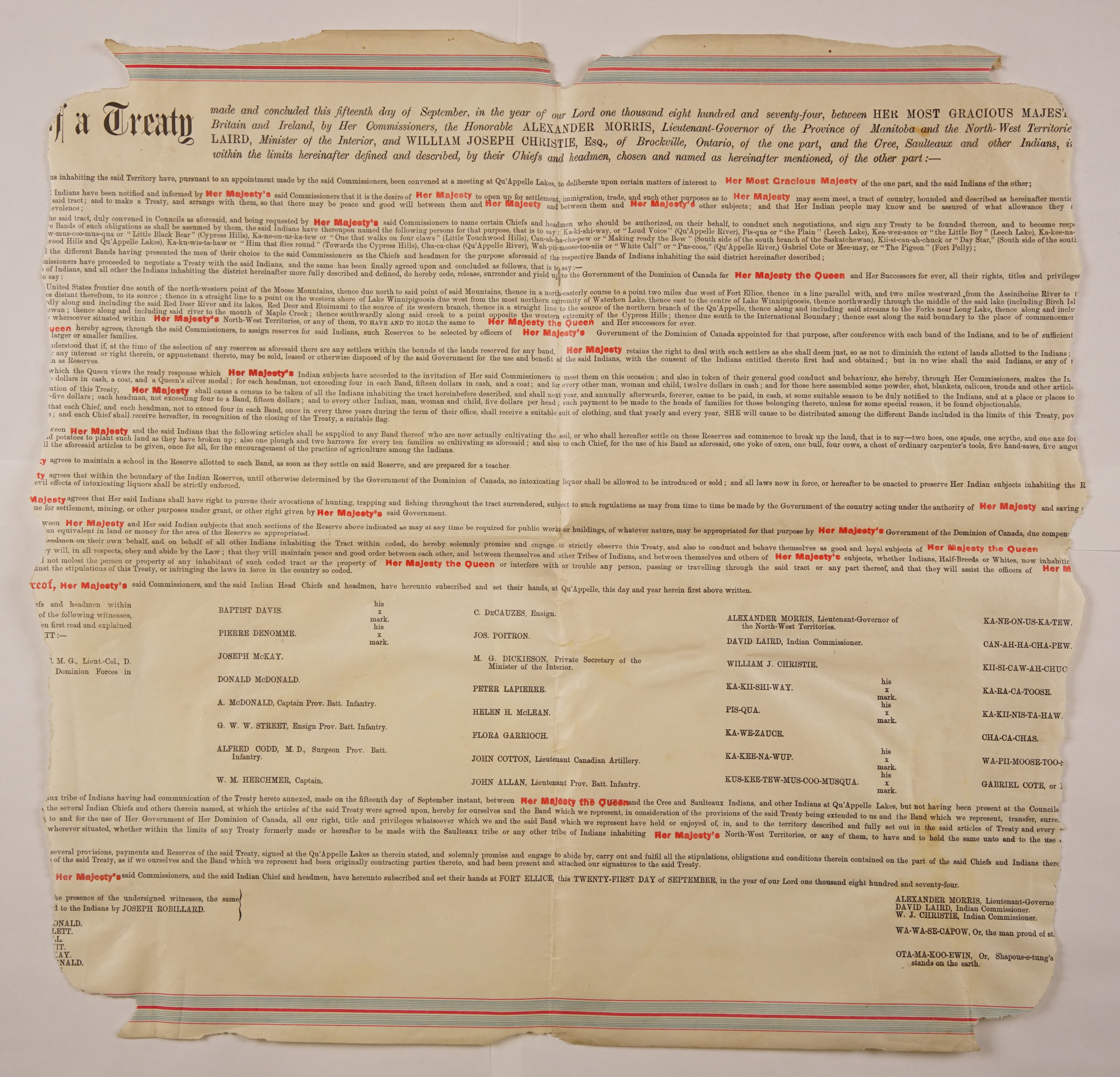
Presentation copy of the original Treaty 4. Printed on parchment. -- Text in black and red; blue and red border. Sourced from the Bruce Peel Special Collections at University of Alberta Library.

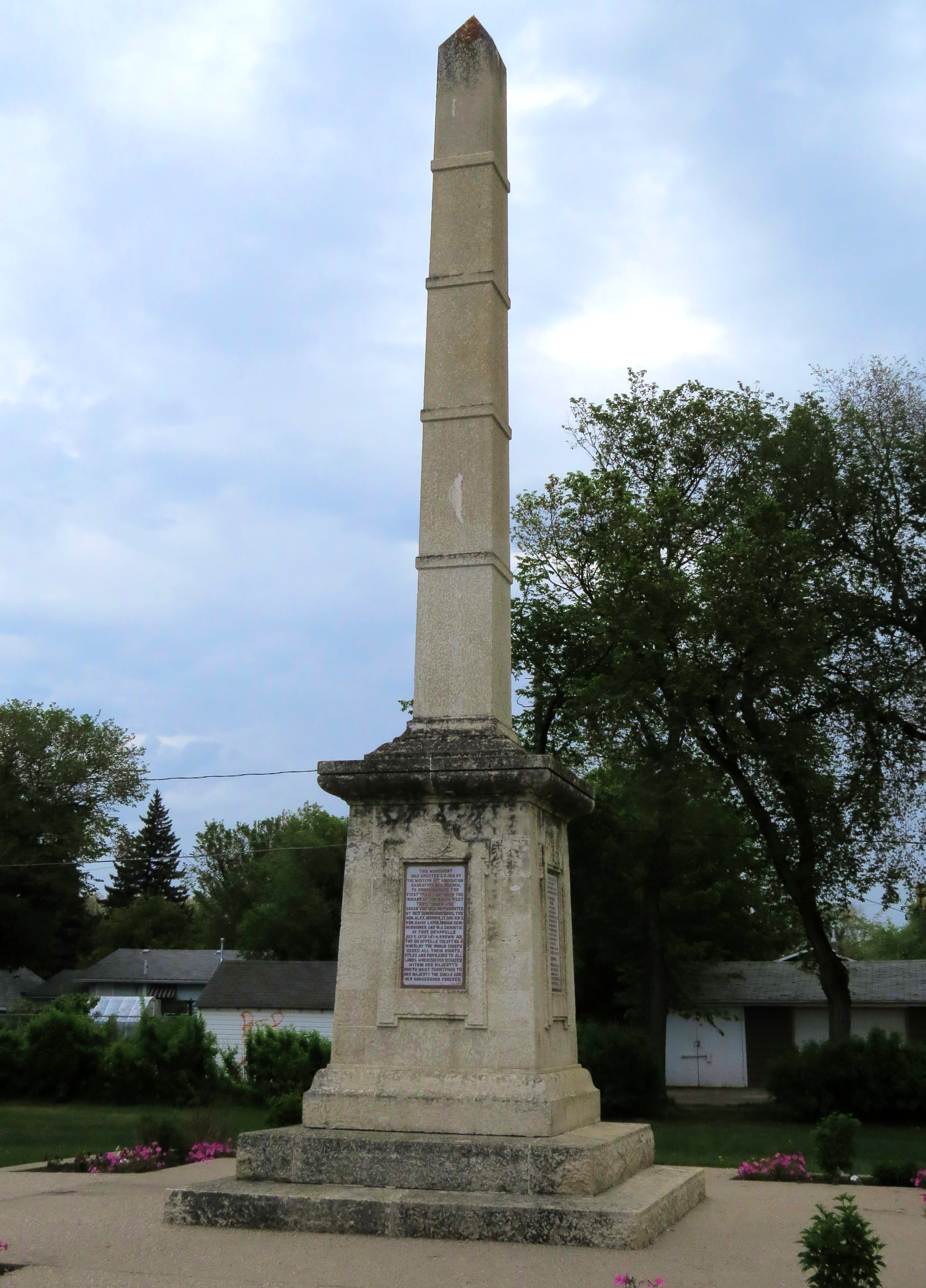
Monument to Treaty 4 signing

In 1873, the first three numbered treaties were concluded and as a result, a clear route was established for the intended transcontinental railway. The Canadian government had also decided that there was enough land for the beginning of settlement and development. Therefore, they had no interest to negotiate any other treaties at that time. However, the Indigenous people who had not been a part of treaty discussions were worried about their future because of the dwindling bison and the ongoing settlement. They were aware that other Indigenous communities who lived southeast in the newly confederated land had signed treaties for themselves. They believed that the treaties provided protection from the change and economic hardships, and they wanted that for themselves too. Until treaties were signed with them, the Prairie Indigenous people made it clear to the Canadian government that they believed the land belonged to them and thus they demanded compensation and assistance. Chief of the Plains Cree, Sweet Grass, wrote a letter to Morris in which he wrote, "we heard our lands were sold and we did not like it", and made a list of demands. Chief Yellow Quill of Saulteaux bands also took action when settlers cut wood for timber without Indigenous permission. When he asked for a treaty and did not receive an answer, he put a sign on a church door warning the settlers not to cut any more wood because without a treaty, the wood belonged to the Saulteaux. Because of this consistent pressure, the Canadian government agreed to negotiate treaties sooner than expected. The disruptions made by the Indigenous people were interrupting the development of the land.

Treaty 4 negotiations had a slow start and discussions were delayed several times. Conflict surrounding the negotiations arose from disagreement between the different bands. They also felt resentment towards the Canadians and the commissioners due to the sale of Rupert's Land and the £300,000 that the Hudson's Bay Company received. The Canadian commissioners arrived at the outpost on 8 September 1874, but the bands were not able to select spokesmen. The discussions were delayed until 11 September when they elected some of them to represent their side in the discussions. However, on that day, the Saulteaux informed the Canadian commissioners with a messenger that they were uncomfortable holding negotiations on land that belonged to the Hudson's Bay Company. Treaty discussions were postponed again, and the next day they met at camp closer to where the Indigenous people were staying. An Indigenous spokesman began by stating that they wanted to be paid the £300,000 that the Hudson's Bay Company received for Rupert's Land. Morris refused this request, and made it clear that it would not be given. Once again the treaty discussions were postponed. Finally, on the 15th, treaty terms were concluded. The terms were explained to the Indigenous people by an interpreter, and both parties signed. In the following years, several adhesions to Treaty 4 occurred: on 21 September 1874, by Saulteaux; on 8 September 1875, by Cree, Saulteaux, and Stony Indigenous; on 9 September 1875, by Cree, Saulteaux, and Stony; on 24 September by Cree, Saulteaux, and Stony; on 24 August 1876, by Cree and Saulteaux; and on 25 September 1877, by Stony.

== Terms of the treaty ==
The terms of the treaty are as follows:

Map of Treaty 4 territory in relation to other treaty lands and Canadian provinces

The Canadian Government will establish reserves in areas of land selected by them. This land cannot be sold by the Indigenous, but can be sold or leased by the Government in order benefit the Indigenous, and only with their consent. When they are prepared for a teacher, schools will be provided on each reserve. 640 acres will be distributed to each family of five. Liquor is forbidden on the reserves. Every year, each man, woman, and child will be given $5; every chief will be given $25; all headman will be given $15 (with the exception of four headmen per band); as well as every chief and headman will get one set of clothing every three years. Powder, shot, ball, and twine is distributed and replaced every year, to help with hunting, fishing, and trapping – rights that they were still able to enjoy. To allow for a transition for the Aboriginal peoples to acquire agricultural skills, each willing family will be given two hoes, one spade, one scythe, and one axe. One plough and two harrows is given to be shared among ten families. The bands interested in agriculture will be given supplies as well. The chiefs receive one crosscut saw, one pitsaw, one grindstone, five augers, five handsaws, and a box of carpenter tools for band use. They get one yoke of oxen, one bull, four cows, and "enough" wheat, barley, potatoes, and oats for planting. Furthermore, the treaty states that the Indigenous must recognize the treaty and promise to be "loyal subjects". They need to obey Canadian laws, keep the peace, and notify the Government when there are people who break the laws. They must also agree not to disturb the settlers or anyone who travels through the land. Further the treaty explicitly provides that the government may utilize the surrendered lands "as may be required or taken up from time to time for settlement, mining or other purposes, under grant or other right given by Her Majesty's said Government" and does not give any right of veto, while ensuring any lands used on the reserve by the government must be offset with matching grant of non-reserve lands.

== Timeline ==
- 15 September 1874: first signings at Fort Qu'Appelle by Cree, Saulteaux, and Assiniboine bands
- 21 September 1874: Fort Ellice adhesion by Saulteaux band
- 8 September 1875: Qu'Appelle Lakes adhesion by Cree, Saulteaux, and Stony bands
- 9 September 1875: additional Qu'Appelle Lakes adhesion by Cree, Saulteaux, and Stony bands
- 24 September 1875: Swan Lake adhesion by Cree, Saulteaux, and Stony bands
- 24 August 1876: Fort Pelly adhesion by Cree and Saulteaux bands
- 25 September 1877: Fort Walsh adhesion by Stony and Assiniboine bands

== List of Treaty 4 First Nations ==
- Manitoba
  - Swampy Cree Tribal Council the chief of the tribe
    - Chemawawin Cree Nation—Treaty 5 signatory council member
    - Grand Rapids First Nation—Treaty 5 signatory council member
    - Marcel Colomb First Nation—Treaty 6 signatory council member
    - Mathias Colomb First Nation—Treaty 6 signatory council member
    - Mosakahiken Cree Nation—Treaty 5 signatory council member
    - Opaskwayak Cree Nation—Treaty 5 signatory council member
    - Sapotaweyak Cree Nation
    - Wuskwi Sipihk First Nation
  - West Region Tribal Council
    - Ebb and Flow First Nation—Treaty 2 signatory council member
    - Gamblers First Nation —Treaty 4 signatory though in Treaty 2 territory
    - Keeseekoowenin Ojibway First Nation—Treaty 2 signatory council member
    - O-Chi-Chak-Ko-Sipi First Nation—Treaty 2 signatory council member
    - Pine Creek First Nation —Treaty 4 signatory though in Treaty 2 territory
    - Rolling River First Nation —Treaty 4 signatory though in Treaty 2 territory
    - Skownan First Nation—Treaty 2 signatory council member
    - Tootinaowaziibeeng Treaty Reserve First Nation —Treaty 4 signatory though in Treaty 2 territory
  - independent
    - Waywayseecappo First Nation —Treaty 4 signatory though in Treaty 2 territory
- Saskatchewan
  - File Hills Qu'Appelle Tribal Council
    - Carry The Kettle First Nation
    - Little Black Bear First Nation
    - Muscowpetung First Nation
    - Nekaneet First Nation
    - Okanese First Nation
    - Pasqua First Nation
    - Peepeekisis Cree Nation
    - Piapot First Nation
    - Standing Buffalo First Nation—non-Treaty signatory council member; included in Treaty 4
    - Star Blanket Cree Nation
    - Wood Mountain First Nation—non-Treaty signatory council member; included in Treaty 4
  - Saskatoon Tribal Council
    - Kinistin Saulteaux Nation
    - Mistawasis First Nation—Treaty 6 signatory council member
    - Muskeg Lake First Nation—Treaty 6 signatory council member
    - Muskoday First Nation—Treaty 6 signatory council member
    - One Arrow First Nation—Treaty 6 signatory council member
    - Whitecap Dakota First Nation—non-Treaty signatory council member
    - Yellow Quill First Nation
  - Touchwood Agency Tribal Council
    - Day Star First Nation
    - Fishing Lake First Nation
    - Gordon First Nation
    - Kawacatoose First Nation
    - Muskowekwan First Nation
  - Yorkton Tribal Administration
    - Coté First Nation
    - Kahkewistahaw First Nation
    - Keeseekoose First Nation
    - Ocean Man First Nation—Treaty 4 signatory though in Treaty 2 territory
    - The Key First Nation
    - Zagime Anishinabek
  - independent
    - Cowessess First Nation
    - Ochapowace First Nation
    - Pheasant Rump Nakota First Nation—Treaty 4 signatory though in Treaty 2 territory
    - White Bear First Nation—Treaty 4 signatory though in Treaty 2 territory

== See also ==
- Numbered Treaties
- The Canadian Crown and First Nations, Inuit and Métis
