= Cree =

Indigenous people of North America

nêhiyawak ᓀᐦᐃᔭᐘᐠ (Plains); Nīhithawak ᓃᐦᐃᖬᐘᐠ (Woods); nêhinawak ᓀᐦᐃᓇᐘᐠ (W Swampy); Īthiniwak ᐁᖨᓂᐘᐠ (Rocky); ininîwak ᐃᓂᓃᐘᐠ (E Swampy); ililîwak ᐃᓕᓕᐗᒃ (Moose); Iiyiyuuch ᐄᔨᔫᒡ (East, Coastal); Iinuuch ᐄᓅᒡ (East, Inland)
- Map of Cree and closely related languages

Total population
- 356,655 (2016 census), including Atikamekw and Innu

Regions with significant populations
- Canada
- Alberta: 95,300 (2016)
- Saskatchewan: 89,990 (2016)
- Manitoba: 66,895 (2016)
- Ontario: 36,750 (2016)
- British Columbia: 35,885 (2016)
- Quebec: 27,245 (2016)

Languages
- Cree, Cree Sign Language, English, French

Religion
- Anglicanism, Cree religion, Pentecostalism, Roman Catholicism

Related ethnic groups
- Métis, Anisininew, Ojibwe, Innu, Naskapi

*nehi + *rowi / *elenyiwa "balance" + "action, movement" / "human being"
- Person: Cree: Plains: nêhiyaw ᓀᐦᐃᔭᐤ; Woods: Nīhithaw ᓃᐦᐃᖬᐤ; Swampy (W): nêhinaw ᓀᐦᐃᓇᐤ; Rocky: Īthiniw ᐁᖨᓂᐤ; Swampy (E): ininîw ᐃᓂᓃᐤ; Moose: ililîw ᐃᓕᓕᐤ; East (Coast): Iiyiyuu ᐄᔨᔫ; East (Inl.): Iinuu ᐄᓅ; Related peoples: Anisininew: Anihshininii ᐊᓂᐦᔑᓂᓃ; Atikamekw: Nehirowisiw; Innu (W): Innu; Innu (E): Ilnu; Naskapi: iiyuw ᐃᔪᐤ
- People: Cree: Plains: nêhiyawak ᓀᐦᐃᔭᐘᐠ; Woods: Nīhithawak ᓃᐦᐃᖬᐘᐠ; Swampy (W): nêhinawak ᓀᐦᐃᓇᐘᐠ; Rocky: Īthiniwak ᐁᖨᓂᐘᐠ; Swampy (E): ininîwak ᐃᓂᓃᐘᐠ; Moose: ililîwak ᐃᓕᓕᐗᒃ; East (Coast): Iiyiyuuch ᐄᔨᔫᒡ; East (Inl.): Iinuuch ᐄᓅᒡ; Related peoples: Anisininew: Anihshininiiwag ᐊᓂᐦᔑᓂᓃᐗᐠ; Atikamekw: Nehirowisiwok; Innu (W): Innut / Innuat; Innu (E): Ilnuatsh; Naskapi: iiyinaahch ᐃᔨᓇᒡ
- Language: Cree languages: Plains: nēhiyawēwin ᓀᐦᐃᔭᐍᐏᐣ; Woods: Nīhithawīwin ᓃᐦᐃᖬᐑᐏᐣ; Swampy (W): nêhinawêwin ᓀᐦᐃᓇᐌᐎᐣ; Rocky: Īthiniwīwin ᐁᖨᓂᐑᐏᐣ; Swampy (E): ininîmowin ᐃᓂᓃᒧᐎᓐ; Moose: ililîmowin ᐃᓕᓖᒧᐎᓐ; East (N Coast): Iiyiyiuyimuwin ᐄᔨᔨᐅᔨᒧᐧᐃᓐ; East (S Coast): Iiyiyuuayimuwin ᐄᔨᔫᐊᔨᒧᐧᐃᓐ; East (Inl.): Iinuuayimuwin ᐄᓅᐊᔨᒧᐧᐃᓐ; Related languages: Oji-Cree: Anihshininiimowin ᐊᓂᐦᔑᓂᓃᒧᐏᐣ; Atikamekw: nehirâmowin; Innu (W): Innu-Aimûn; Innu (E): Ilnu-Aimûn; Naskapi: Iyuw Iyimuun ᐃᔪᐤ ᐃᔨᒧᐅᓐ; Hand Talk: Plains: isiniskêstâkêwin ᐃᓯᓂᐢᑫᐢᑖᑫᐃᐧᐣ
- Country: Cree countries: Plains: nêhiyâwaskiy ᓀᐦᐃᔭᐘᐢᑭᐩ; Woods: Nīhithawīaskiy ᓃᐦᐃᖬᐍᐊᐢᑭᐩ; Swampy (W): nêhinawaskiy ᓀᐦᐃᓇᐘᐢᑭᐩ; Rocky: Īthiniwaskiy ᐁᖨᓂᐗᐢᑭᐩ; Swampy (E): ininîwaskiy ᐃᓂᓂᐗᔅᑭᔾ; Moose: ililîwaskiy ᐃᓕᓕᐗᔅᑭᔾ; East (N. Coast): Iiyiyiu Aschii ᐄᔨᔨᐤ ᐊᔅᒌ; East (S. Coast): Iiyiyuu Aschii ᐄᔨᔫ ᐊᔅᒌ; East (Inl.): Iinuu Aschii ᐄᓅ ᐊᔅᒌ; Related countries: Anisininew (Oji-Cree): Atikamekw: Nitaskinan (Nehirowisi Aski); Innu: Nitassinan (Innu/Ilnu Assi); Naskapi: St'aschinuw ᒋᑦ ᐊᔅᒋᓄᐤ

The Cree are a North American Indigenous people, numbering more than 350,000 in Canada, where they form one of the country's largest First Nations macro-communities. There are numerous Cree peoples and several nations closely related to the Cree, these being the Plains Cree, Woodland Cree, Rocky Cree, Swampy Cree, Moose Cree, and East Cree with the Atikamekw, Innu, and Naskapi being closely related. Also closely related to the Cree are the Anisininew and Métis, both nations of mixed heritage, the former with Ojibweg (Chippewa) and the latter with European fur traders. Cree homelands account for a majority of eastern and central Canada, from Eeyou Istchee in the east in what is now Quebec to northern Ontario, much of the Canadian Prairies, and up into British Columbia and the Northwest Territories. Although a majority of Cree live in Canada, there are small communities in the United States, living mostly in Montana where they share Rocky Boy's Indian Reservation with the Ojibwe people.

The Cree are in a variety of treaty relations with the Canadian state. Most notable are the Numbered Treaties which cover a majority of Cree homelands. In Quebec, the East Cree (along with the Inuit of Nunavik) entered into one of the first modern treaties: the James Bay and Northern Quebec Agreement which formalized relations between the province and both Eeyou Istchee and the Nunavik region of Inuit Nunangat. A documented westward migration, over time, has been strongly associated with their roles as traders and hunters in the North American fur trade. The Cree, along with other tribes such as the Ojibwa, were displaced from a large area north of Winnipeg between 1905 and the 1930s by the Canadian government.

== Etymology ==
The word "Cree" comes into English from the French Cris, short for Christinaux (alternatively: Kristineaux, Kiristinous, or Kilistinous), which came from the Ojibwemowin word Kinistino. The Ojibweg used the term for numerous communities which they encountered north and west of Lake Superior, predominately in Manitoba. The French used these terms to refer to various groups of peoples in Canada, some of which are now better distinguished as Severn Anishinaabe (Anisininew or Oji-Cree), who speak a related but distinct Algonquian language (Ojibwemowin).

In general, Cree and peoples related to the Cree (like the Atikamekw and Innu) use one of two terms to refer to themselves. The first comes from the Proto-Algonquian roots *nehi and *rowi meaning "balance" and "action, movement" which, when combined, becomes the Cree word for "Indigenous person". Nations like the Plains Cree (sing. nêhiyaw ᓀᐦᐃᔭᐤ; plural: nêhiyawak ᓀᐦᐃᔭᐘᐠ), Woodland Cree (Nīhithaw ᓃᐦᐃᖬᐤ; pl.: Nīhithawak ᓃᐦᐃᖬᐘᐠ), and Western Swampy Cree (nêhinaw ᓀᐦᐃᓇᐤ; pl.: nêhinawak ᓀᐦᐃᓇᐘᐠ) use such a formulation. The Atikamekw also use this form (Nehirowisiw; pl.: Nehirowisiwok), which adds the Proto-Algonquian root *siw ("human being"), rendering "one who is in balance with nature" as its translation.

The other form comes from the Proto-Algonquian root *elenyiwa meaning "human", used by the rest of the Cree and related nations:

- Rocky Cree: Īthiniw; pl.: Īthiniwak
- Eastern Swampy Cree: ininîw ᐃᓂᓃᐤ; pl.: ininîwak ᐃᓂᓃᐘᐠ'
- Moose Cree: ililîw ᐃᓕᓕᐤ; pl.: ililîwak ᐃᓕᓕᐗᒃ
- East Cree:
  - Coastal: Iiyiyuu ᐄᔨᔫ; pl.: Iiyiyuuch ᐄᔨᔫᒡ
  - Inland: Iinuu ᐄᓅ; pl.: Iinuuch ᐄᓅᒡ
- Innu:
  - Western: Innu; pl.: Innut / Innuat
  - Eastern: Ilnu; pl.: Ilnuatsh
- Naskapi: iiyuw ᐃᔪᐤ; pl.: iiyinaahch ᐃᔨᓇᒡ

== Sub-groups and geography ==
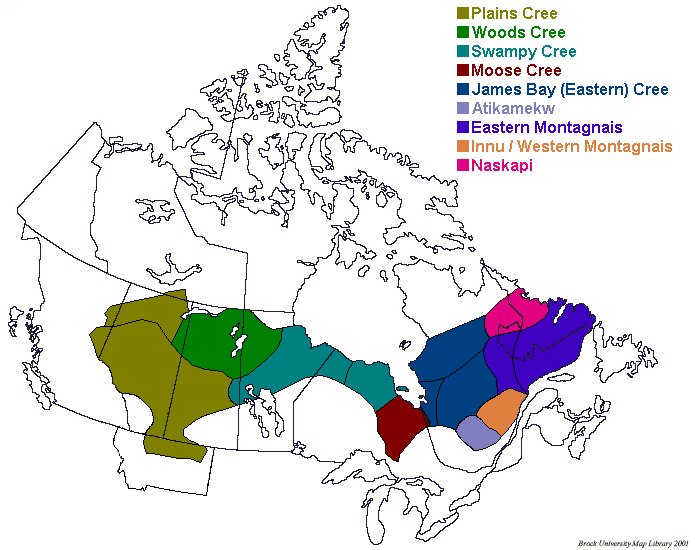
Map of Cree and closely related languages

The Cree are generally divided into eight groups based on dialect and region. These divisions do not necessarily represent ethnic subdivisions within the larger ethnic group:

- Plains Cree – a total of about 34,000 people in Manitoba, Saskatchewan, Alberta, and Montana, USA.
- Woodland Cree and Rocky Cree – homelands include northern Alberta, Manitoba, and Saskatchewan.
- Swampy Cree – this nation lives in northern Manitoba, along the Hudson Bay coast, and adjacent inland areas to the south and west, as well as in Ontario, along the coasts of Hudson Bay and James Bay. Some also live in eastern Saskatchewan, around Cumberland House. Their dialect has 4,500 speakers.
- Moose Cree – Moose Factory in Northeastern Ontario; this nation lives on Moose Factory Island, near the mouth of the Moose River, at the southern end of James Bay. "Factory" used to refer to a trading post.
- East Cree – Grand Council of the Crees; numbering at approximately 18,000, the Eeyouch and Eenouch live predominately in their homeland, Eeyou Istchee, in northern Quebec as well as in neighbouring Nunavik.
- Atikamekw – although not considered Cree, this closely related nation has one of the highest rates of intergenerational language transmission, with approximately 95% of the nation speaking their language, Nehiromowin. Their homeland is named Nitaskinan, translating to "our land", and it is located in the upper Saint-Maurice River valley of Quebec (about 300 km (190 mi) north of Montreal). Their population is around 8,000.
- Innu and Naskapi – also not considered Cree, these closely related nations, once called "Montagnais", live in their homelands of Nitassinan and St'aschinuw (ᒋᑦ ᐊᔅᒋᓄᐤ) on the Labrador Peninsula, both meaning "our land" as well. Their territories comprise most of the present-day political jurisdictions of eastern Quebec and Labrador. Their cultures are differentiated, as some of the Naskapi are still caribou hunters, and more nomadic than many of the Innu; the Innu have more permanent settlements. The total population of the two groups (in 2003) was about 18,000 people, of which approx. 15,000 were in Quebec. Their dialects and languages are the most distinct from the Cree spoken by the groups west of Lake Superior.

Due to the many dialects of the Cree language, the people have no modern collective autonym. The Plains Cree and Attikamekw refer to themselves using modern forms of the historical nêhiraw ("Indigenous person"), namely nêhiyaw and nêhirawisiw, respectively. The Moose Cree, East Cree, Naskapi, and Innu all refer to themselves using modern dialectal forms of the historical iriniw, meaning 'man.' Moose Cree use the form ililiw, coastal East Cree and Naskapi use iyiyiw (variously spelled iiyiyiu, iiyiyuu, and eeyou), inland East Cree use iyiniw (variously spelled iinuu and eenou), and Montagnais use ilnu and innu, depending on dialect. The Cree use "Cree", "cri", "Naskapi, or "montagnais" to refer to their people only when speaking French or English.

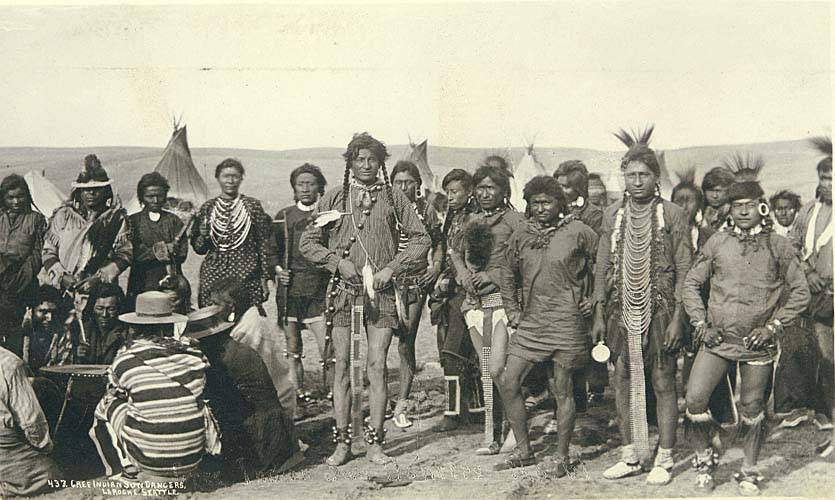
A group of Cree Sun Dancers, photographed c. 1893 by Frank La Roche

== Political aboriginal organization ==
=== Historical ===
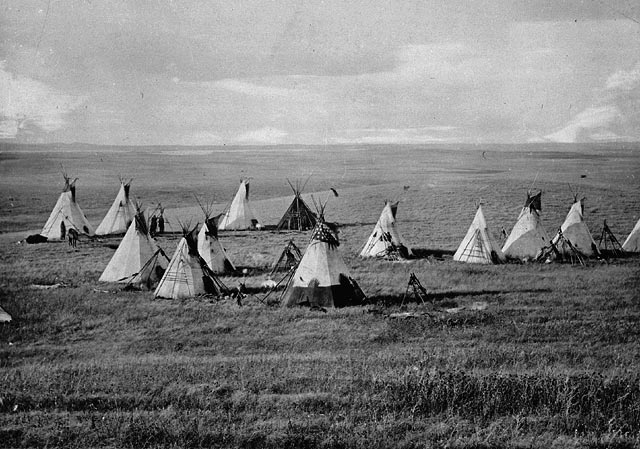
Plains Cree camp near the future site of Vermilion, Alberta, in 1871

As hunter-gatherers, the basic units of organization for Cree peoples were the "lodge", a group of perhaps eight to a dozen people, usually the families of two separate, but related, married couples living together in the same wigwam (domed tent) or tipi (conical tent), and the band, a group of lodges who moved and hunted together. In the case of disagreement, lodges could leave bands, and bands could be formed and dissolved with relative ease. However, as there is safety in numbers, all families would want to be part of some band, and banishment or exile was considered a very serious punishment. Bands would usually have strong ties to their neighbours through intermarriage and would assemble together at different parts of the year to hunt and socialize together. Other than these regional gatherings, there was no higher-level formal structure, and decisions of war and peace were made by consensus, with allied bands meeting together in-council. People could be identified by their clan, which is a group of people claiming descent from the same common ancestor; each clan would have a representative and a vote in all important councils held by the band (compare: Anishinaabe clan system).

Each band remained independent of each other. However, Cree-speaking bands tended to work together and with their neighbours against outside enemies. Those Cree who moved onto the Great Plains and adopted bison hunting, called the Plains Cree, were allied with the Assiniboine, the Métis Nation, and the Saulteaux in what was known as the "Iron Confederacy", which was a major force in the North American fur trade from the 1730s to the 1870s. The Cree and the Assiniboine were important intermediaries in the First Nations trading networks on the northern plains.

When a band went to war, they would nominate a temporary military commander, called a okimahkan, loosely translated as "war chief". This office was different from that of the "peace chief", a leader who had a role more like that of diplomat. Big Bear was the leader of his band in the run-up to the 1885 North-West Rebellion, but once the fighting started Wandering Spirit became war leader.

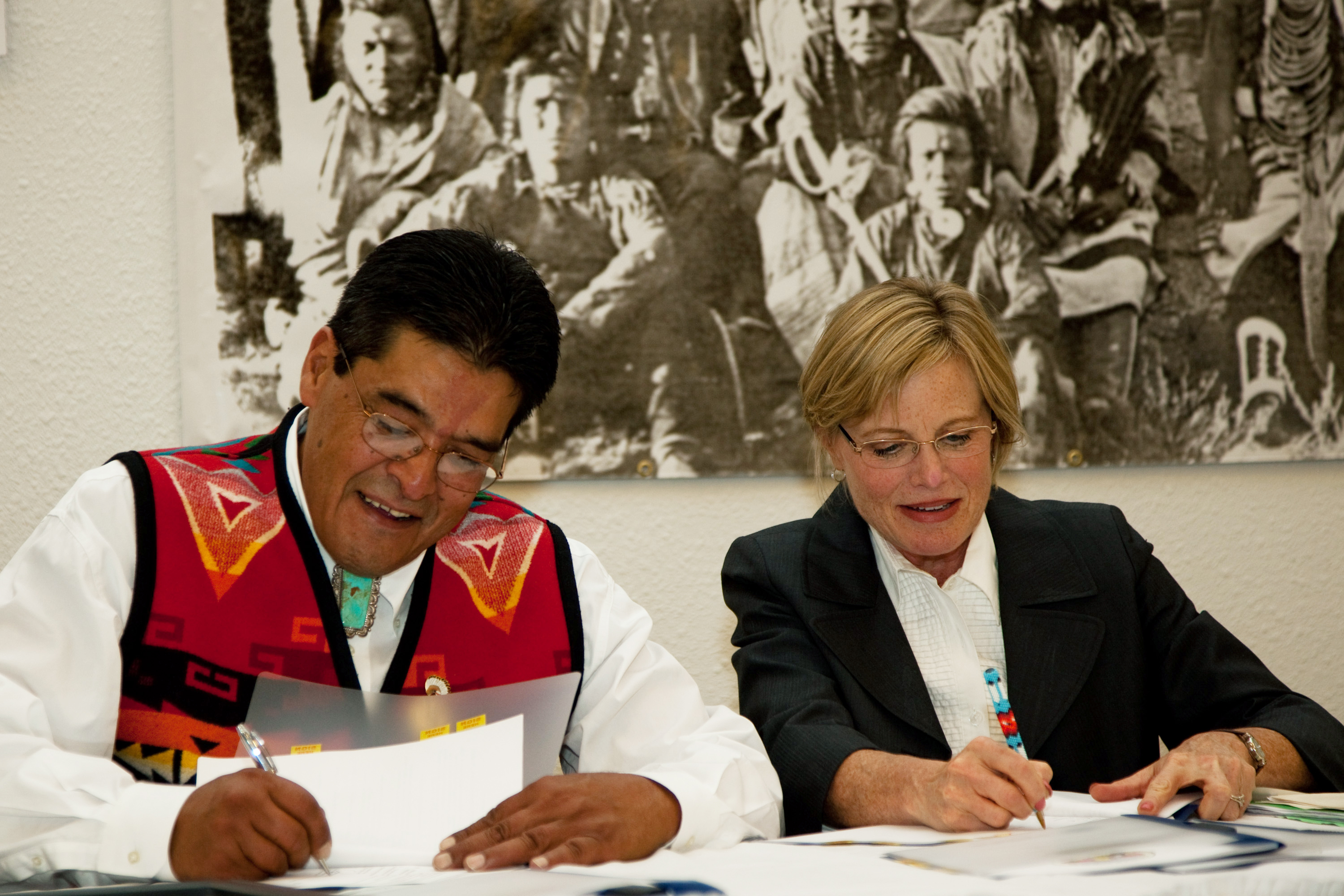
Chippewa Cree Tribal Chairman Raymond Parker Jr. signs an agreement with FEMA in Rocky Boy's Indian Reservation, Montana, on 17 August 2010.

=== Contemporary ===
There have been several attempts to create a national political organization that would represent all Cree peoples, at least as far back as a 1994 gathering at the reserve of the Opaskwayak Cree Nation.

== Language ==
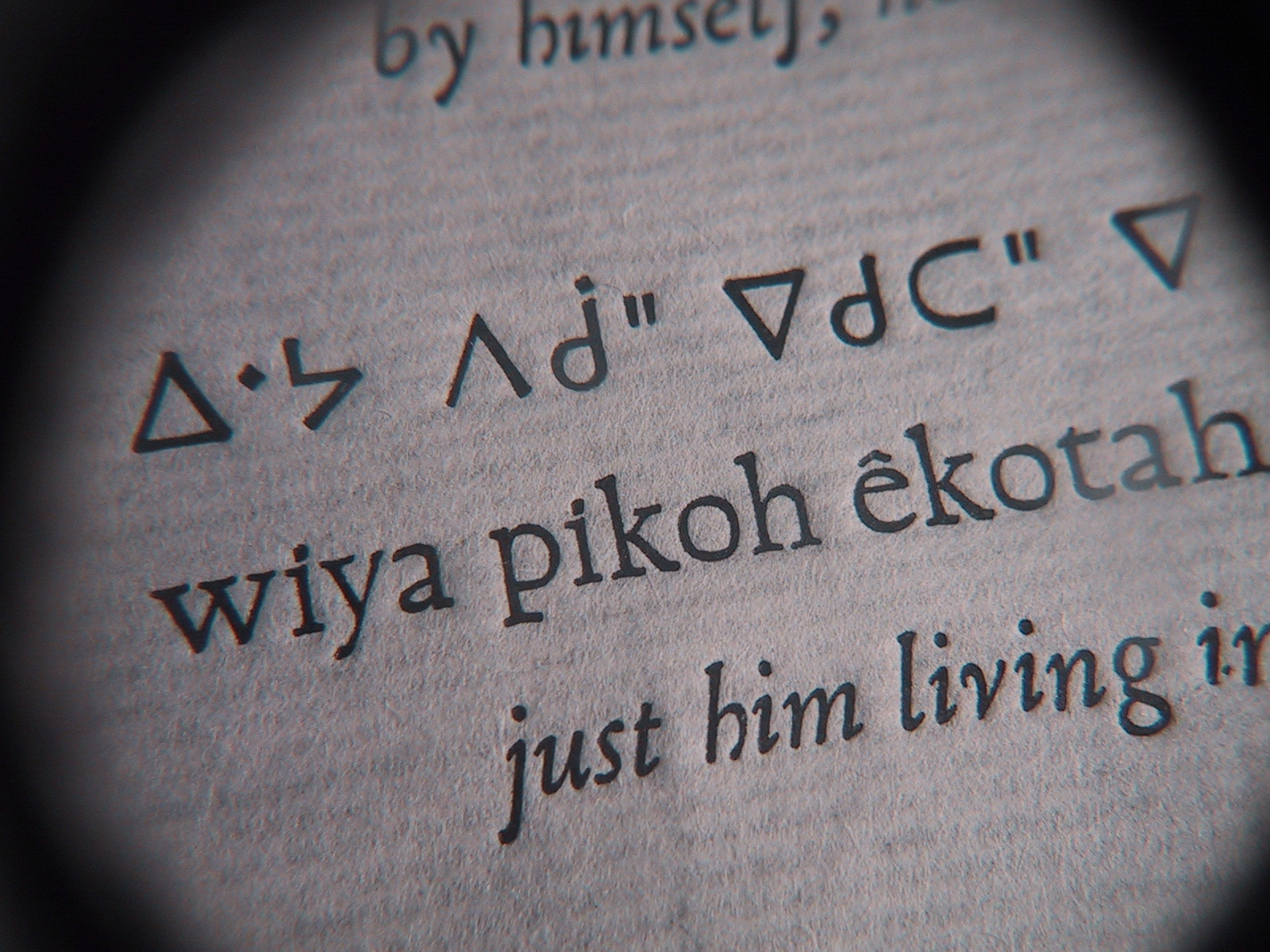
Cree language.

The Cree language (also known in the most broad classification as Cree-Montagnais, Cree-Montagnais-Naskapi, to show the groups included within it) is the name for a group of closely related Algonquian languages, the mother tongue (i.e. language first learned and still understood) of approximately 96,000 people, and the language most often spoken at home of about 65,000 people across Canada, from the Northwest Territories to Labrador. It is the most widely spoken Indigenous language in Canada. The only region where Cree has official status is in the Northwest Territories, together with eight other aboriginal languages, French and English.

The two major groups, nehiyaw and Innu, speak a mutually intelligible Cree dialect continuum, which can be divided by many criteria. In a dialect continuum, "It is not so much a language, as a chain of dialects, where speakers from one community can very easily understand their neighbours, but a Plains Cree speaker from Alberta would find a Quebec Cree speaker difficult to speak to without practice."

One major division between the groups is that the Eastern group palatalizes the sound /k/ to either /ts/ (c) or to /tʃ/ (č) when it precedes front vowels. There is also a major difference in grammatical vocabulary (particles) between the groups. Within both groups, another set of variations has arisen around the pronunciation of the Proto-Algonquian phoneme *l, which can be realized as /l/, /r/, /y/, /n/, or /ð/ (th) by different groups. Yet in other dialects, the distinction between /eː/ (ē) and /iː/ (ī) has been lost, merging to the latter. In more western dialects, the distinction between /s/ and /ʃ/ (š) has been lost, both merging to the former. "Cree is a not a typologically harmonic language. Cree has both prefixes and suffixes, both prepositions and postpositions, and both prenominal and postnominal modifiers (e.g. demonstratives can appear in both positions)."

Victor Golla, an American linguist, counts Cree dialects as eight of 55 North American languages that have more than 1,000 speakers and which are being actively acquired by children.

== Identity and ethnicity ==
=== In Canada ===
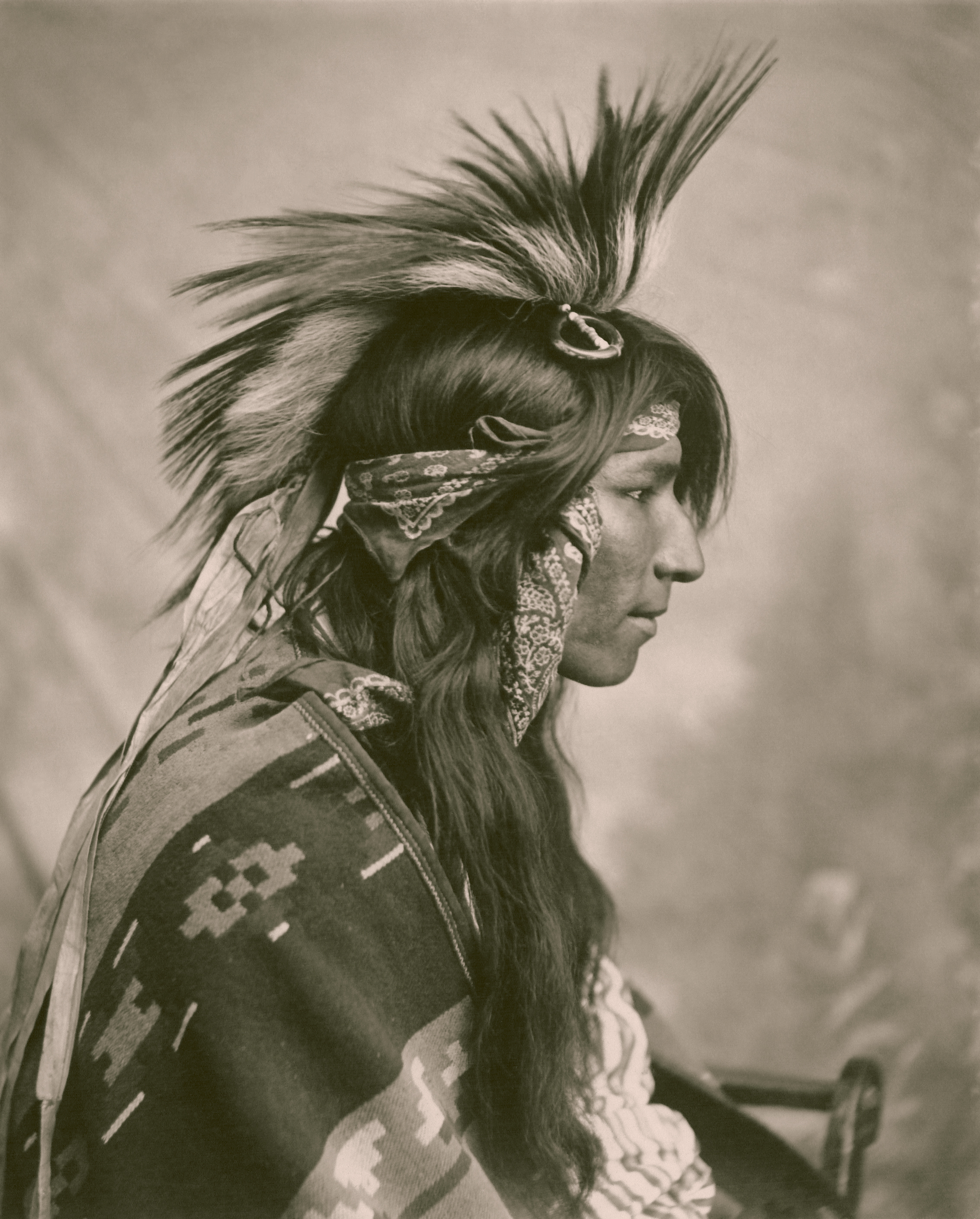
Cree Indian, taken by G. E. Fleming, 1903

The Cree are the largest group of First Nations in Canada, with 220,000 members and 135 registered bands. Together, their reserve lands are the largest of any First Nations group in the country. The largest Cree band and the second largest First Nations band in Canada after the Six Nations of the Grand River of the Iroquois is the Lac La Ronge Indian Band in northern Saskatchewan.

Given the traditional Cree acceptance of mixed marriages, it is acknowledged by academics that all bands are ultimately of mixed heritage and multilingualism and multiculturalism was the norm. In the west, mixed bands of Cree, Saulteaux, Métis, and Assiniboine, all partners in the Iron Confederacy, are the norm. However, in recent years, as indigenous languages have declined across western Canada, where there were once three languages spoken on a given reserve, there may now only be one. This has led to a simplification of identity, and it has become "fashionable" for bands in many parts of Saskatchewan to identify as "Plains Cree" at the expense of a mixed Cree-Salteaux history. There is also a tendency for bands to categorize themselves as "Plains Cree" instead of Woods Cree or Swampy Cree. Neal McLeod argues this is partly due to the dominant culture's fascination with Plains Indian culture as well as the greater degree of written standardization and prestige Plains Cree enjoys over other Cree dialects.

The Métis (from the French, Métis – of mixed ancestry) are people of mixed ancestry, such as Cree and French, English, or Scottish heritage. According to Crown–Indigenous Relations and Northern Affairs Canada, the Métis were historically the children of French fur traders and Cree women, or from unions of English or Scottish traders and Cree, Northwestern Ojibwe, or northern Dene women (Anglo-Métis). The Métis National Council defines a Métis as "a person who self-identifies as Métis, is distinct from other Aboriginal peoples, is of historic Métis Nation Ancestry and who is accepted by the Métis Nation".

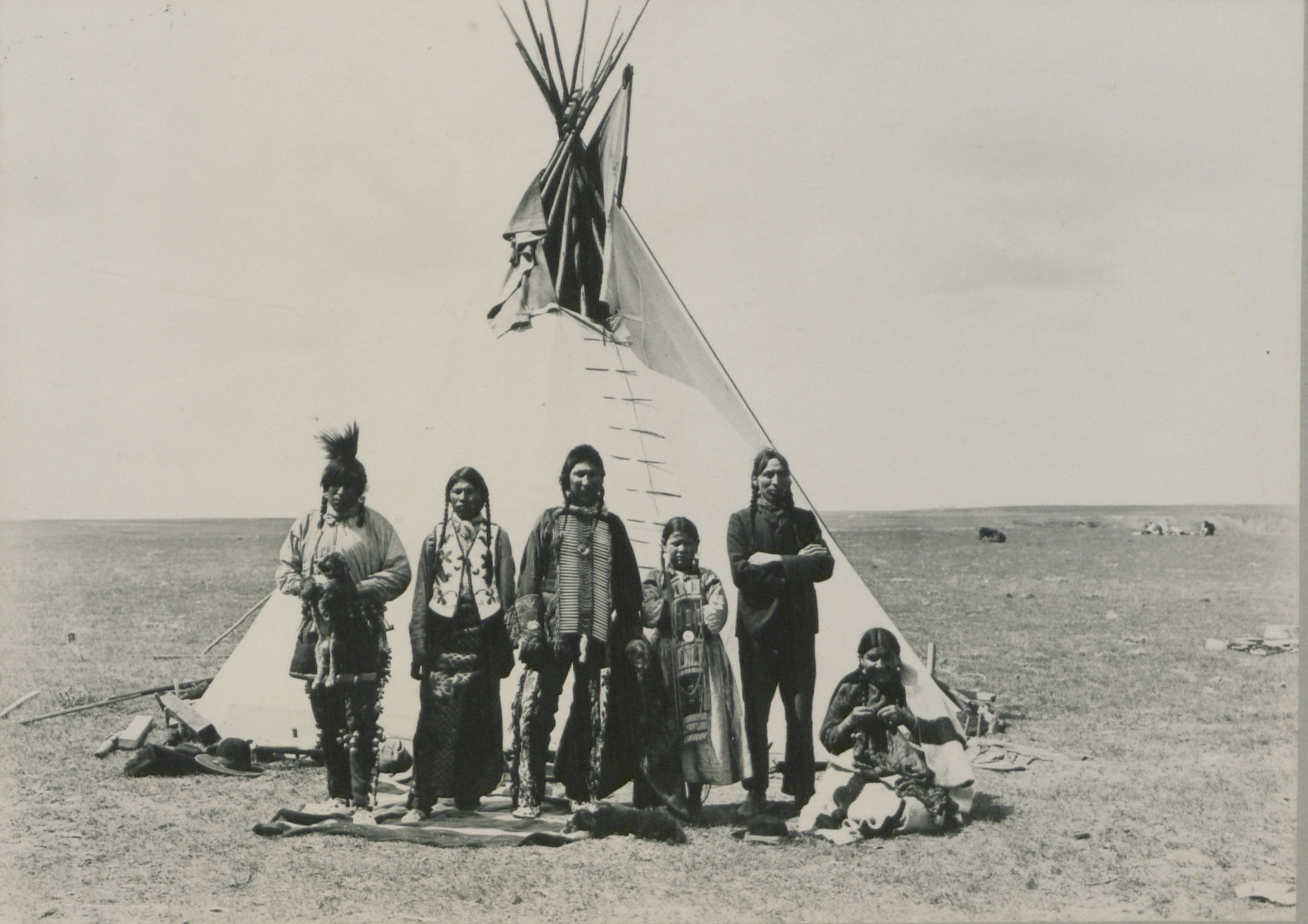
Group of Cree people

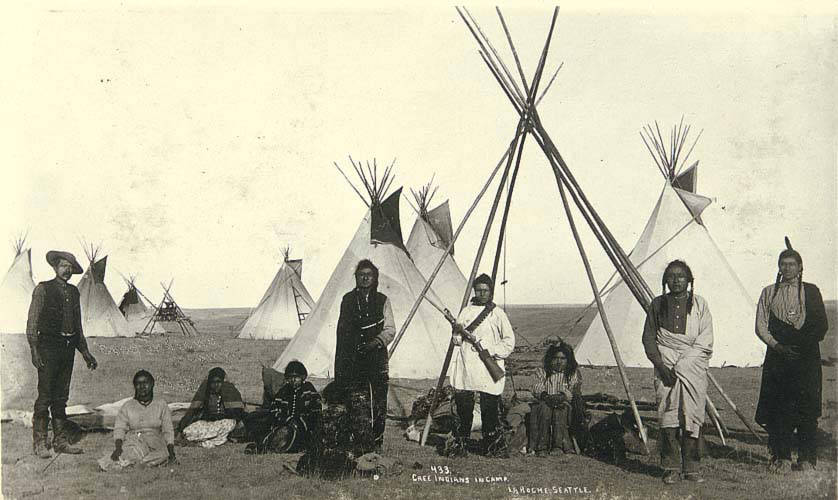
A Cree camp, likely in Montana, photographed c. 1893

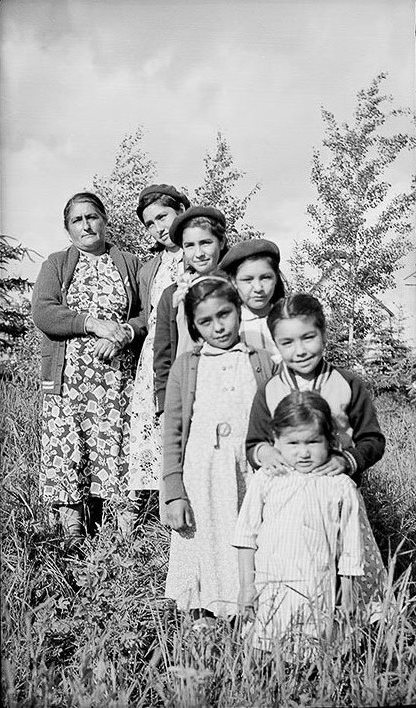
Merasty women and girls, Cree, The Pas, Manitoba, 1942

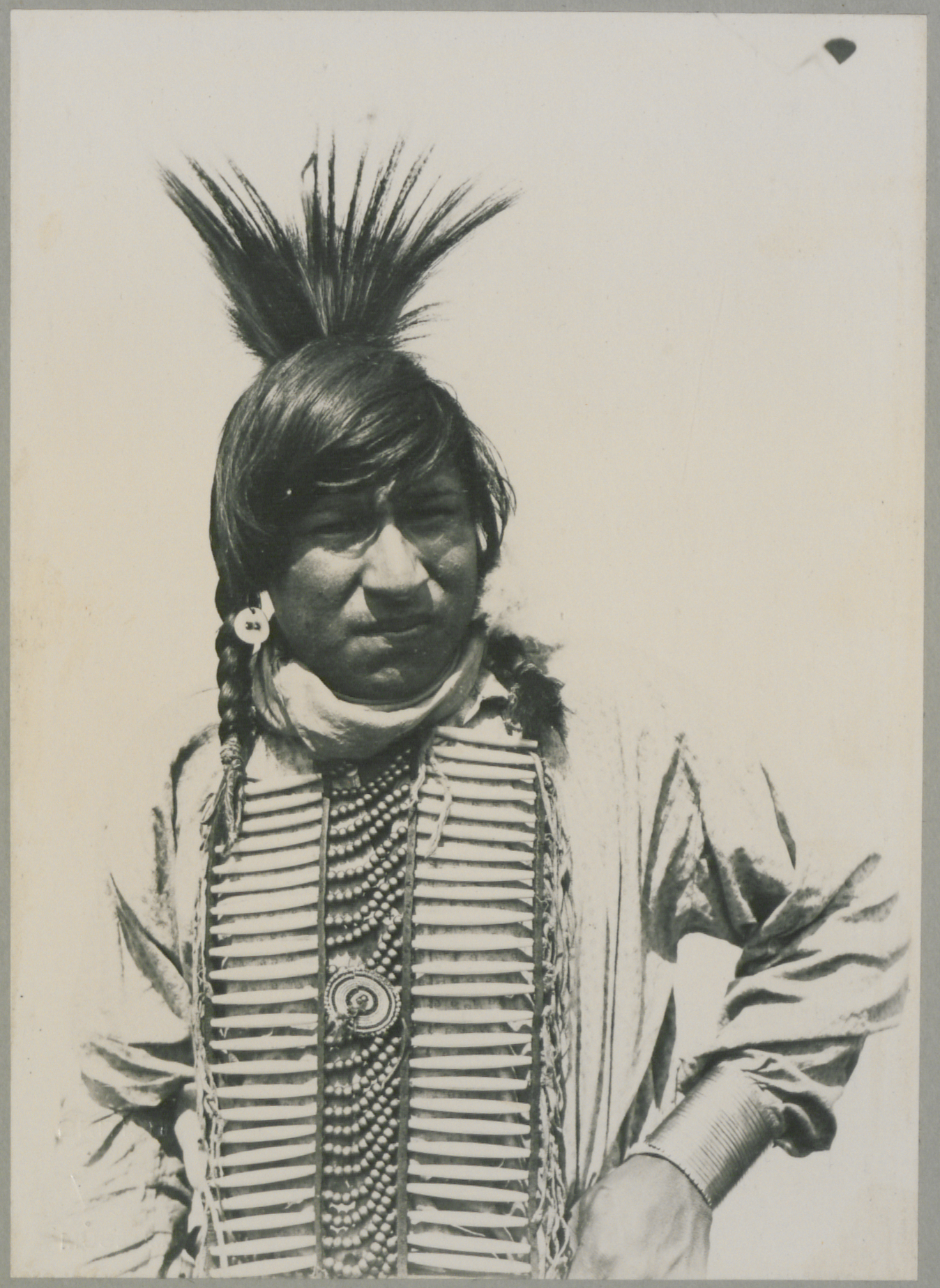
Chief King of the Wind

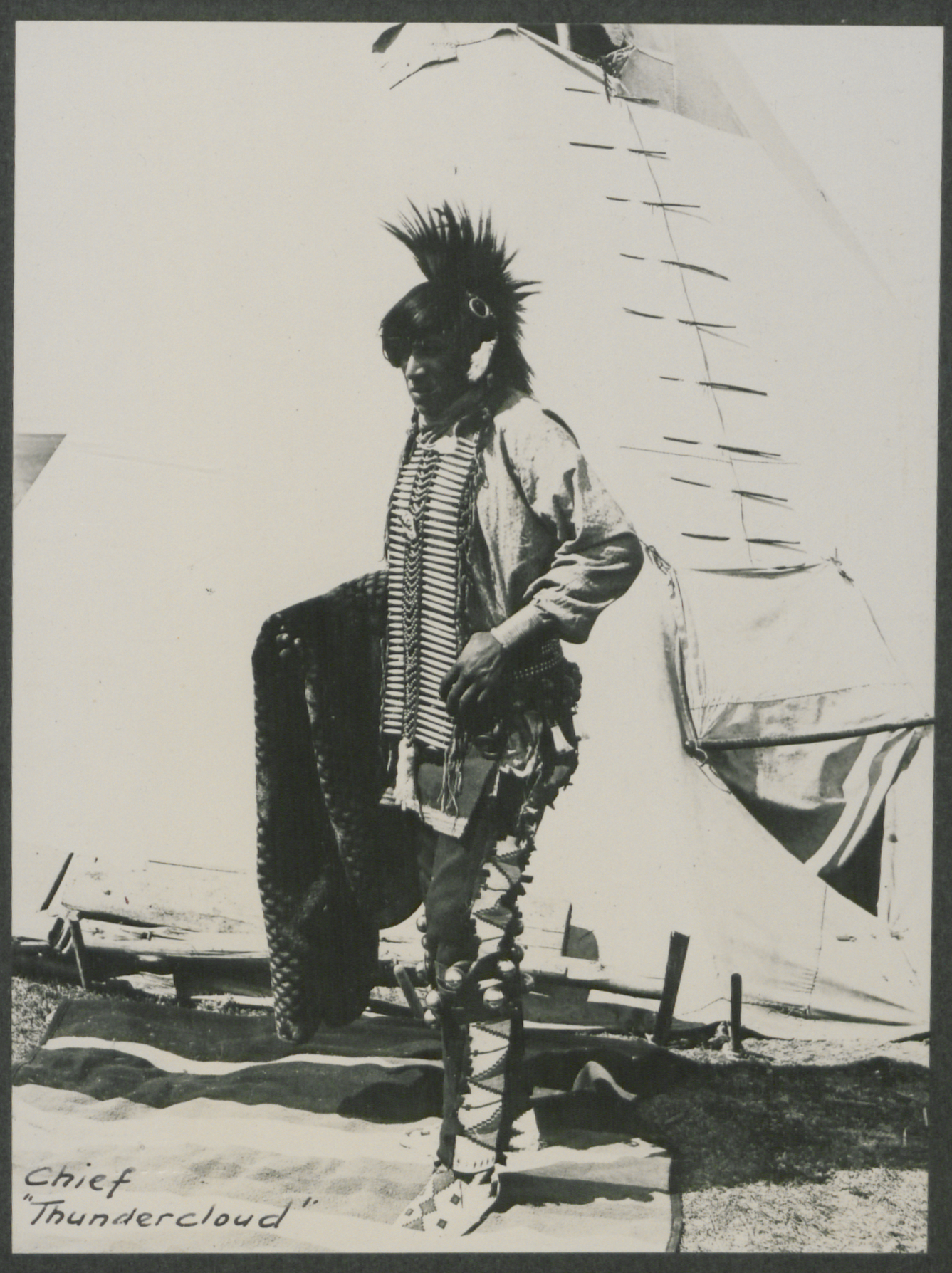
Chief Thundercloud

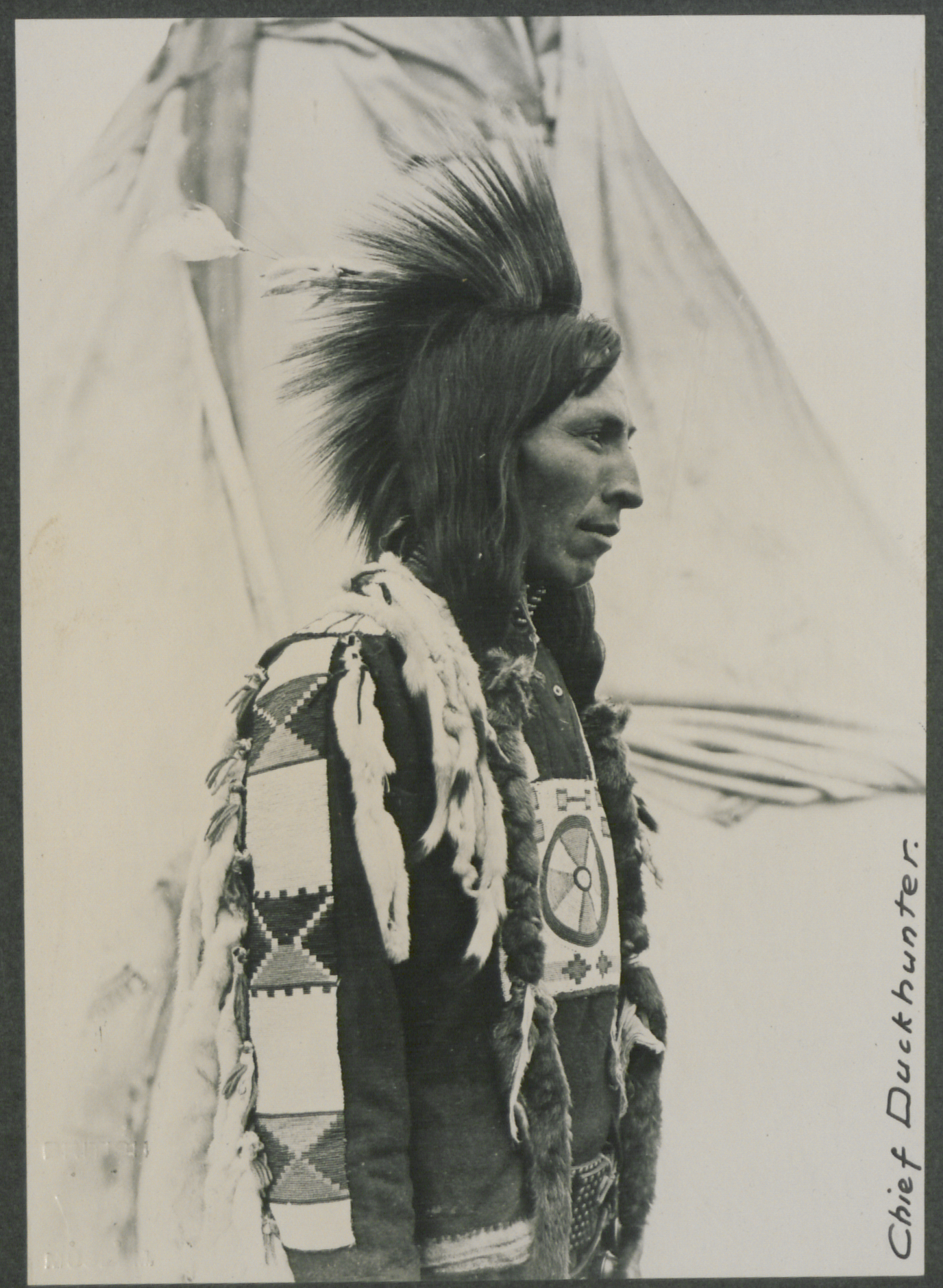
Chief Duckhunter

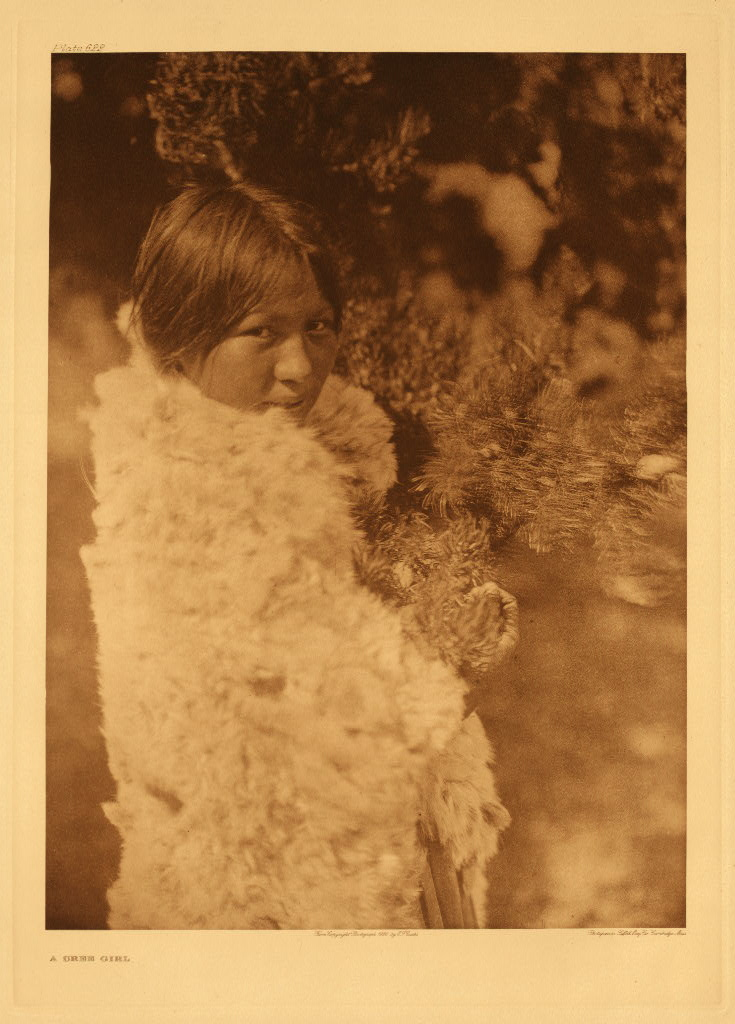
Cree girl (1928)

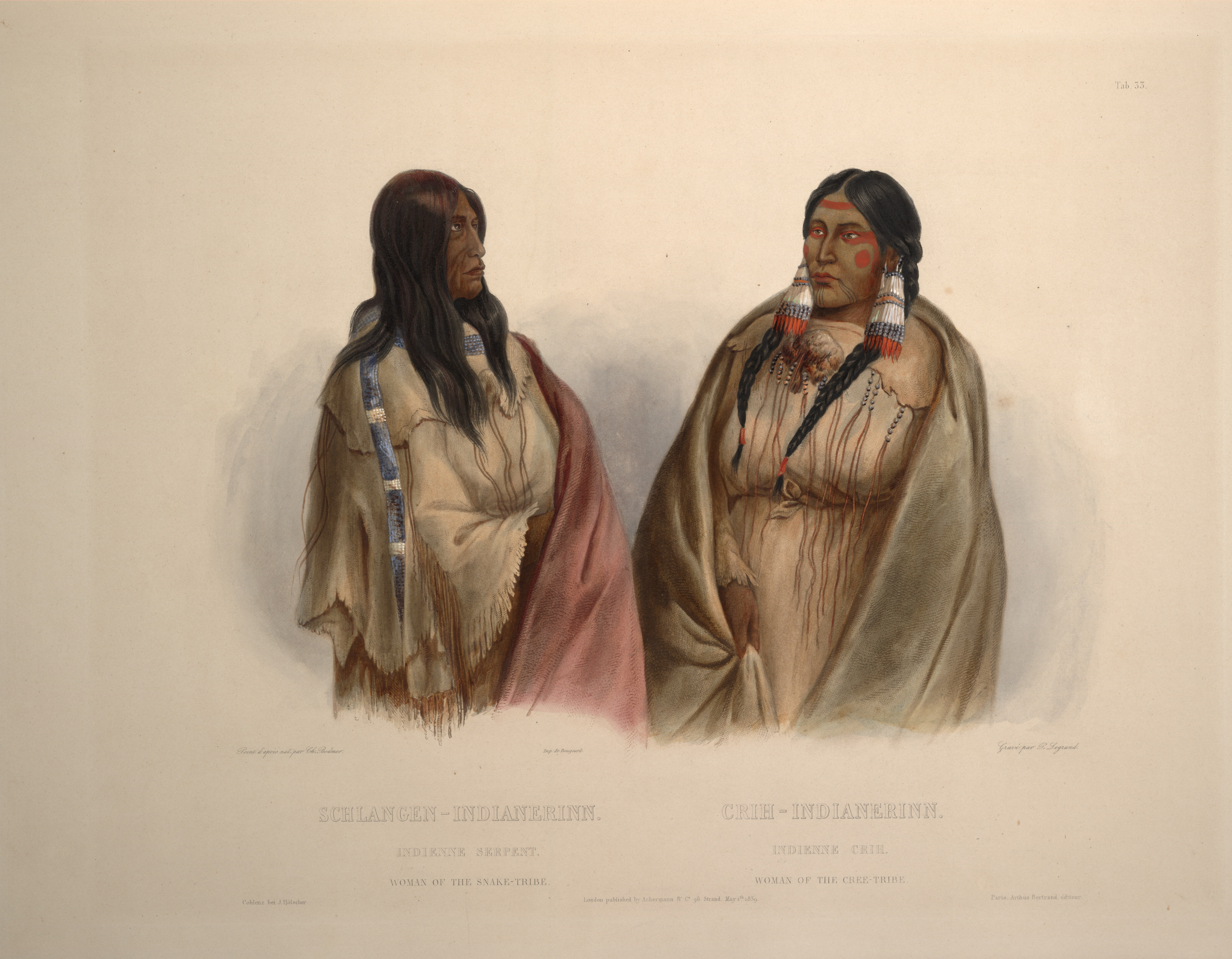
Illustration of a Snake woman (left) and a Cree woman (right), c. 1840–1843, Karl Bodmer

=== In the United States ===
In the past, Cree lived in northern Minnesota, North Dakota, and Montana. Today, American Cree are mostly the Chippewa Cree who reside on the Rocky Boy's Indian Reservation and are a federally recognized tribe. Others are enrolled as "Landless Cree" on the Fort Peck Indian Reservation and as "Landless Cree" and "Rocky Boy Cree" on the Fort Belknap Indian Reservation, all in Montana. The Chippewa Cree share the reservation with the Pembina Band of Chippewa Indians, who form the Chippewa (Ojibwe) part of the Chippewa Cree tribe. On the other reservations, the Cree minority share the reservation with the Assiniboine, Gros Ventre, and Sioux tribes. Historically, the southern limits of the Cree territory in Montana were the Missouri River and the Milk River.

== First contact ==
In Manitoba, the Cree were first contacted by Europeans in 1682, at the mouth of the Nelson and Hayes rivers by a Hudson's Bay Company (HBC) party travelling about 160 km (100 mi) inland. In the south, in 1732; Pierre Gaultier de Varennes, sieur de La Vérendrye, in what is now northwestern Ontario, met with an assembled group of 200 Cree warriors near present-day Fort Frances, as well as with the Monsoni, (Moose Cree, a branch of the Ojibwe). Both groups had donned war paint in preparation to an attack on the Dakota and another group of Ojibwe.

After acquiring firearms from the HBC, the Cree moved as traders into the plains, acting as middlemen with the HBC.

== Communities ==
=== Naskapi ===
Naskapi communities

The Naskapi are the Innu First Nations inhabiting a region of northeastern Quebec and Labrador, Canada. The Naskapi are traditionally nomadic peoples, in contrast with the territorial Montagnais, the other segment of Innu. The Naskapi language and culture is quite different from the Montagnais, in which the dialect changes from y to n as in "Iiyuu" versus "Innu". Iyuw Iyimuun is the Innu dialect spoken by the Naskapi. Today, the Naskapi are settled into two communities: Kawawachikamach Quebec and Natuashish, Newfoundland and Labrador.

The Naskapi Nation of Kawawachikamach is located in the Naskapi village of Kawawachikamach, 15 km (9.3 mi) northeast of Schefferville, Quebec. The village is in the reserve of the same name.

The Mushuau Innu First Nation, located in the community of Natuashish, Newfoundland and Labrador, is located in the Natuashish 2 reserve on the coast of Labrador.

=== Innu ===
==== Eastern Innu ====
Eastern Innu communities

Innus of Ekuanitshit live on their reserve of Mingan, Quebec, at the mouth of the Mingan River of the St. Lawrence River in the Côte-Nord (north shore) region.

Innu Takuaikan Uashat Mak Mani-Utenam based in Sept-Îles, Quebec, in the Côte-Nord region on the St. Lawrence River. They own two reserves: Maliotenam 27A, 16 km (9.9 mi) east of Sept-Îles, and Uashat 27, within Sept-Îles.

Innu Nation of Matimekush-Lac John is based in Schefferville, Quebec. One reserve, Matimekosh, is an enclave of Schefferville. The other, Lac-John, is 2 km (1.2 mi) outside the town.

Première Nation des Innus de Nutashkuan is based on their reserve of Nutashkuan or Natashquan. The reserve is located on the north shore of the Gulf of Saint Lawrence at the mouth of the Natashquan River.

Montagnais de Pakua Shipi located in the community of Pakuashipi, Quebec, on the western shore of the mouth of the Saint-Augustin River on the north shore of the Gulf of Saint Lawrence in the Côte-Nord region. The community is adjacent to the settlement of Saint-Augustin.

Montagnais de Unamen Shipu are located at La Romaine, Quebec at the mouth of the Olomane River on the Gulf of Saint Lawrence. They have one reserve; Romaine 2.

Sheshatshiu Innu First Nation located in the community of Sheshatshiu in Labrador and is located approximately 45 km (28 mi) north of Happy Valley-Goose Bay. Sheshatshiu is located adjacent to the Inuit community of North West River. The Sheshatshiu Nation has one reserve, Sheshatshiu 3.

==== Western Innu ====
Pekuakamiulnuatsh First Nation is located on the reserve of Mashteuiatsh in the Saguenay–Lac-Saint-Jean region, 8 km (5.0 mi) north of Roberval, Quebec, on the western shore of Lac Saint-Jean.

Pessamit Innu Band based in Pessamit (Betsiamites), Quebec, is located about 58 km (36 mi) southwest of Baie-Comeau along the north shore of the Saint Lawrence River at the mouth of the Betsiamites River. It is across the river directly north of Rimouski, Quebec. Pessamit is 358 km (222 mi) northeast of Quebec City.

Innue Essipit are based in their reserve of Essipit, adjacent to the village of Les Escoumins. The community is on the north shore of the Saint Lawrence River at the mouth of the Escoumins River in the Côte-Nord region, 40 km (25 mi) northeast of Tadoussac and 250 km (160 mi) northeast of Québec.

=== Atikamekw (Nehiraw) ===
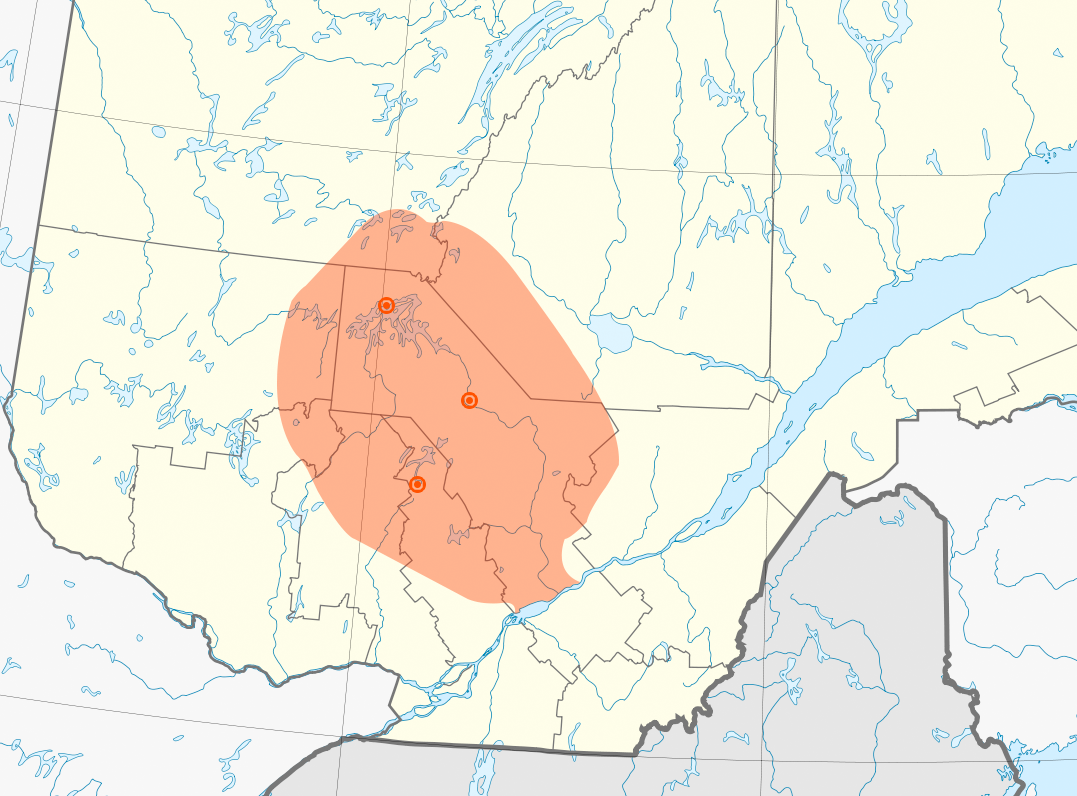
Map of Nitaskinan

Conseil de la Nation Atikamekw, officially named Atikamekw Sipi – Conseil de la Nation Atikamekw, is a tribal council in Quebec. It is composed of three Atikamekw First Nations. The council is based in La Tuque, Quebec. The Atikamekw are inhabitants of the area called Nitaskinan ("Our Land" in the Atikamekw language), in the upper Saint-Maurice River valley.

The First Nations:

- Atikamekw of Opitciwan live in Obedjiwan, Quebec, on the north shore of Gouin Reservoir in the Mauricie region. Their reserve, Obedjiwan 28, contains the community. It is located approximately 375 km (233 mi) by road west of Saguenay and 375 km (233 mi) east of Val-d'Or.
- Atikamekw of Manawan are based in Manawan, Quebec, on the south-western shores of Lake Métabeskéga in the Lanaudière region. The reserve is located 165 km (103 mi) by road northeast of Mont-Laurier or 250 km (160 mi) north of Montreal.
- Wemotaci Atikamekw Council in Wemotaci on the north shore of the Saint-Maurice River at the mouth of the Manouane River in the Mauricie region approximately 165 km (103 mi) north of Trois-Rivières. The Nation owns two reserves; the first is around Wemotaci while the second is Coucoucache 24 on the north shore of Reservoir Blanc on the Saint-Maurice River.

=== James Bay Cree ===
Eeyou Istchee is a territory equivalent to a regional county municipality (TE) of Nord-du-Québec represented by the Grand Council of the Crees. On 24 July 2012, the Quebec government signed an accord with the Cree Nation that resulted in the abolition of the neighbouring municipality of Baie-James and the creation of the new Eeyou Istchee James Bay Regional Government, providing for the residents of surrounding Jamésie TE and Eeyou Istchee to jointly govern the territory formerly governed by the municipality of Baie-James. Eeyou Istchee is a territory of eight enclaves within Jamésie plus one enclave (Whapmagoostui) within Kativik TE. Each enclave is a combination of a Cree reserved land (TC) and a Cree village municipality (VC), both with the same name.

Location of Eeyou Istchee within Quebec

- Cree Nation of Chisasibi is at the Cree village of Chisasibi and the reserved land at reserved land at Chisasibi on the south shore of La Grande River on the eastern shore of James Bay. The Nation's reserve is Chisasibi TC. Chisasibi is accessible via road and its airport. It is 768 km (477 mi) northwest of Chibougamau via the Route du Nord and the James Bay Road. (Chibougamau is 700 km (430 mi) by road north of Montreal).
- Eastmain (Cree Nation) is located at Eastmain VC and Eastmain TC is the reserve. The nation is located on the east coast of James Bay at the mouth of the Eastmain River. Eastmain is 619 km (385 mi) northwest of Chibougamau via the Route du Nord and the James Bay Road.
- Cree Nation of Mistissini is based in the Cree village of Mistissini, located in the south-east corner of the largest natural lake in Quebec, Lake Mistassini. The associated reserve is Mistissini TC. Mistissini is 90 km (56 mi) northeast of Chibougamau on Route 167.
- Cree Nation of Nemaska is headquartered at Nemaska VC and its reserve is Nemaska TC located on the western shores of Lake Champion. The village is the seat of the Grand Council of the Crees. Nemaska is 333 km (207 mi) northwest of Chibougamau, at km 300 of the Route du Nord.
- Oujé-Bougoumou Cree Nation is located in the Cree village of Oujé-Bougoumou on the shores of Opémisca Lake. Unlike the other nations of Eeyou Istchee, Oujé-Bougoumou does not have an associated reserve. The village is 60 km (37 mi) due west of Chibougamau.
- The Crees of the Waskaganish First Nation is located at Waskaganish VC at the mouth of the Rupert River on the south-east shore of James Bay. The associated reserve is Waskaganish TC. Founded in 1668 as Charles Fort, two years before the creation of the HBC, the community is on the site of the first fur trading post of the Hudson's Bay Company. After the HBC was formed, the community was known as Fort Rupert, Rupert Fort, or Rupert House after Prince Rupert of the Rhine, the first governor of the HBC.
- Cree First Nation of Waswanipi is located in the Cree village of Waswanipi and the reserve is Waswanipi TC. The Nation is located near the confluence of the Chibougamau and Waswanipi Rivers.
- Cree Nation of Wemindji is headquartered at Wemindji VC and its reserve is Wemindji TC. The village is on the east coast of James Bay at the mouth of the Maquatua River and is 696 km (432 mi) north of Chibougamau via the Route du Nord.
- First Nation of Whapmagoostui located at Whapmagoostui VC, is the northernmost Cree village, located at the mouth of the Great Whale River on the coast of Hudson Bay in Kativik TE. The village is just south of the river while the Inuit village of Kuujjuarapik is on the north shore.
- Cree Nation of Washaw Sibi was recognized as the tenth Cree Nation Community at the 2003 Annual General Assembly of the Cree Nation. The nation does not yet have a community or reserve recognized by either the Canadian or Quebec governments but they have chosen an area about 40 minutes' drive south of Matagami.

=== Moose Cree ===
Moose Cree communities

Moose Cree (Cree: Mōsonī or Ililiw), also known as Moosonee, are located in Northeastern Ontario.

Constance Lake First Nation is the only Cree member of Matawa First Nations. They are located on their reserves, Constance Lake 92 and English River 66, in the Cochrane District, Ontario.

Mushkegowuk Council, based in Moose Factory, represents chiefs from seven First Nations across Ontario. Moose Cree members are Chapleau Cree First Nation, Kashechewan First Nation, Missanabie Cree First Nation, Moose Cree First Nation, and Taykwa Tagamou Nation. The Chapleau Cree First Nation and their two reserves, Chapleau Cree Fox Lake and Chapleau 75, are located outside of Chapleau, Ontario in the Sudbury District. The Kashechewan First Nation community is located on the northern shore of the Albany River on James Bay. The Hudson's Bay Company established a post, Fort Albany, at this location between 1675 and 1679. Kashechewan First Nation is one of two communities that were established from Old Fort Albany, the other being Fort Albany First Nation. The two nations share the Fort Albany 67 reserve. The Missanabie Cree First Nation signed Treaty 9 in 1906 but did not receive any reserved lands until 2018. The Missanabie reserve is in the Missanabie, Ontario area. The Moose Cree First Nation is based in Moose Factory in the Cochrane District. Moose Factory was founded in 1672–1673 by Charles Bayly, the first overseas governor of the Hudson's Bay Company, and was the company's second post. It was the first English settlement in what is now Ontario. The nation has two reserves: Factory Island 1 on Moose Factory Island, an island in the Moose River, about 16 km (9.9 mi) from its mouth at James Bay; and Moose Factory 68, a tract of land about 15 km (9.3 mi) upstream on the Moose River. The Taykwa Tagamou Nation has two reserves, New Post 69, and their main reserve, New Post 69A outside Cochrane, Ontario along the Abitibi River.

Wabun Tribal Council is a regional chief's council based in Timmins representing Ojibway and Cree First Nations in northern Ontario. Moose Cree members are Brunswick House First Nation and Matachewan First Nation. Brunswick House's reserves are Mountbatten 76A and Duck Lake 76B located in the Sudbury District near Chapleau, Ontario. The Matachewan First Nation is on the Matachewan 72 reserve near Matachewan township in the Timiskaming District.

=== Swampy Cree ===
==== Located in Ontario ====
Swampy Cree communities

Fort Severn First Nation and their reserve, Fort Severn 89, located on the mouth of the Severn River on Hudson Bay, is the most northern community in Ontario. It is a member of Keewaytinook Okimakanak Council.

Mushkegowuk Council, based in Moose Factory, represents chiefs from seven First Nations across Ontario. Swampy Cree members are Fort Albany First Nation and Attawapiskat First Nation. Fort Albany First Nation is located at Fort Albany, Ontario, on the southern shore of the Albany River at James Bay. The reserve, Fort Albany 67, is shared with the Kashechewan First Nation. The Attawapiskat First Nation is located at mouth of the Attawapiskat River on James Bay. The community is on the Attawapiskat 91A reserve. The Attawapiskat 91 reserve is 27,000 ha (67,000 acres) on both shores of the Ekwan River, 165 km (103 mi) upstream from the mouth on James Bay.

Independent from a tribal council is the Weenusk First Nation located in Peawanuck in the Kenora District. The community was located on their reserve of Winisk 90 on the mouth of the Winisk River on James Bay but the community was destroyed in the 1986 Winisk flood and the community had to be relocated to Peawanuck.

==== Located in Manitoba ====
Swampy Cree communities in Manitoba

Keewatin Tribal Council is a Tribal Council based in Thompson, Manitoba that represents eleven First Nations, of which five are Swampy Cree, across northern Manitoba. Fox Lake Cree Nation is based in Gillam, 248 km (154 mi) northeast of Thompson via Provincial Road 280 (PR 280), and has several reserves along the Nelson River. Shamattawa First Nation is located on their reserve, Shamattawa 1, on the banks of the Gods River where the Echoing River joins. The community is remote; only connected via the airport or winter and ice roads to other First Nation communities. The Tataskweyak Cree Nation is located in the community of Split Lake, Manitoba within the Split Lake 171 reserve, 144 km (89 mi) northeast of Thompson on PR 280, on the lake of the same name on the Nelson River system. War Lake First Nation possess several reserves but are located on the Mooseocoot reserve in the community of Ilford, Manitoba, 35 km (22 mi) east of York Landing. York Factory First Nation is based on the reserve of York Landing, 30 km (19 mi) south of Split Lake via ferry. York Factory was a settlement and Hudson's Bay Company (HBC) trading post, established in 1684, on the shore of Hudson Bay, at the mouth of the Hayes River. In 1956, the trading post was closed and the community was moved inland to the current site.

Swampy Cree Tribal Council is, as the name suggests, a tribal council of seven Swampy Cree First Nations across northern Manitoba and is based in The Pas. The Chemawawin Cree Nation (also Rocky Cree) are based on their reserve Chemawawin 2, adjacent to Easterville, Manitoba, 200 km (120 mi) southeast of The Pas. Mathias Colomb First Nation (also Rocky Cree) is located in the community of Pukatawagan on the Pukatawagan 198 reserve. Misipawistik Cree Nation (also Rocky Cree) is located near Grand Rapids, Manitoba, 400 km (250 mi) north of Winnipeg at the mouth of the Saskatchewan River as it runs into Lake Winnipeg. Mosakahiken Cree Nation (also Rocky Cree) is located around the community of Moose Lake about 63 km (39 mi) southeast of The Pas on their main reserve, Moose Lake 31A. Opaskwayak Cree Nation (also Rocky Cree) has several reserves but most of the population lives on the Opaskwayak 21E reserve, immediately north of and across the Saskatchewan River from The Pas. The Sapotaweyak Cree Nation is located in the Shoal River 65A reserve adjacent to the community of Pelican Rapids, about 82 km (51 mi) south of The Pas. Wuskwi Sipihk First Nation has several reserves but the main reserve is Swan Lake 65C which contains the settlement of Indian Birch, about 150 km (93 mi) south of The Pas.

Not affiliated with any Tribal Council: Fisher River Cree Nation, Marcel Colomb First Nation, and Norway House Cree Nation. Fisher River Cree Nation, located approximately 177 km (110 mi) north of Winnipeg in Koostatak on Lake Winnipeg, control the Fisher River 44 and 44A reserves. Marcel Colomb First Nation is located outside of Lynn Lake on the Black Sturgeon reserve on Hughes Lake, 289 km (180 mi) northwest of Thompson via Provincial Road 391. Norway House Cree Nation is located in Norway House which is located on the Playgreen Lake section of the Nelson River system on the north side of Lake Winnipeg. In 1821, Norway House became the principal inland fur trading depot for the Hudson's Bay Company. Norway House was also where Treaty 5 was signed. They control more than 80 reserves from less than 2 ha (4.9 acres) to their largest, Norway House 17, at over 7,600 ha (19,000 acres). The nation is one of the most populous in Canada with 8,599 people as of November 2021.

==== Located in Saskatchewan ====
Prince Albert Grand Council is based in Prince Albert, Saskatchewan and is owned by twelve First Nations of which three are Swampy Cree. Cumberland House Cree Nation is based in Cumberland House, Saskatchewan on the Cumberland House Cree Nation 20 reserve, 97 km (60 mi) southwest of Flin Flon, Manitoba. Cumberland House, founded in 1774 by Samuel Hearne, was the site of the HBC's first inland fur-trading post. The Red Earth First Nation is located in the community of Red Earth, on the banks of the Carrot River, on the Carrot River 29A reserve. Close by is the Red Earth 29 reserve, about 75 km (47 mi) east of Nipawin. Shoal Lake Cree Nation is located in Pakwaw Lake, on the Shoal Lake 28A reserve, 92 km (57 mi) east of Nipawin.

=== Woodland Cree ===
==== Rocky Cree (Asinīskāwithiniwak) ====
Rocky Cree communities in Manitoba

The Keewatin Tribal Council, described under Swampy Cree, also represents Rocky Cree First Nations in Manitoba. The Barren Lands First Nation is located on the north shore of Reindeer Lake close to the Saskatchewan border. It has one reserve, Brochet 197, 256 km (159 mi) northwest of Thompson, adjoining the village of Brochet. The Bunibonibee Cree Nation is located along the eastern shoreline of Oxford Lake at the headwaters of the Hayes River. The Nation controls several reserves with the main reserve being Oxford House 24 adjacent to the community of Oxford House, Manitoba, 160 km (99 mi) southeast of Thompson. God's Lake First Nation is located in the Gods Lake Narrows area on the shore of Gods Lake. The main reserve is God's Lake 23, 240 km (150 mi) southeast of Thompson. The Manto Sipi Cree Nation also live on God's Lake in the community of God's River on the God's River 86A reserve, about 42 km (26 mi) northeast of Gods Lake Narrows. All of the Rocky Cree communities of Keewatin Tribal Council are remote; only connected via air and ice road during winter months.

Five of the Swampy Cree Tribal Council First Nations contain Rocky Cree populations: Chemawawin Cree Nation, Mathias Colomb First Nation, Misipawistik Cree Nation, Mosakahiken Cree Nation, Opaskwayak Cree Nation.

In Saskatchewan, the Prince Albert Grand Council, described under Swampy Cree, also has Rocky Cree members. The Lac La Ronge Indian Band is one of the most populous First Nations in Canada with a registered population of 11,604 as of November 2021. The Nation is based in La Ronge on the Lac la Ronge 156 reserve but has other communities on other reserves. La Ronge is 250 km (160 mi) north of Prince Albert at the north end of Saskatchewan Highway 2. The Montreal Lake Cree Nation, on their reserves of Montreal Lake 106, is on the southern shore of Montreal Lake, 93 km (58 mi) north of Prince Albert. Peter Ballantyne Cree Nation is also a populous First Nation with 11,563 people as of November 2021. The Nation has eight communities and controls a large number of reserves; the administrative center is Pelican Narrows, Saskatchewan, 80 km (50 mi) northeast of Flin Flon, Manitoba. The Sturgeon Lake First Nation is located on the Sturgeon Lake 101 reserve on the eastern shore of Sturgeon Lake about 29 km (18 mi) northwest of Prince Albert.

Not affiliated with any Tribal Council are Cross Lake First Nation, Nisichawayasihk Cree Nation, and O-Pipon-Na-Piwin Cree Nation. The Cross Lake First Nation is a populous Nation with a registered population of 9,138 people as of November 2021. The Nation is in Cross Lake, Manitoba on the Cross Lake 19 reserve, 80 km (50 mi) north of Lake Winnipeg. The Nisichawayasihk Cree Nation is based in Nelson House, Manitoba on the Nelson House 170 reserve located 19 km (12 mi) south of Thompson. The O-Pipon-Na-Piwin Cree Nation is located in the settlement of South Indian Lake, 130 km (81 mi) northwest of Thompson. Marcel Colomb First Nation, listed under Swampy Cree, also has a Rocky Cree population.

==== Woods Cree (Sakāwithiniwak / nīhithawak) ====
The Canoe Lake Cree First Nation is based in Canoe Narrows, Saskatchewan on the Canoe Lake 165 reserve. The nation is a member of the Meadow Lake Tribal Council.

The Bigstone Cree Nation is based in Wabasca, Alberta, about 100 km (62 mi) northeast of Slave Lake, on the Wabasca 166A reserve. The Nation is not associated with a Tribal Council. The Bigstone Cree Nation was divided into two bands in 2010, with one group continuing under the former name, and the other becoming the Peerless Trout First Nation.

The Fort McMurray First Nation is located on the reserves Gregoire Lake 176 and 176A located about 35 km (22 mi) southeast of Fort McMurray near Anzac, Alberta on Gregoire Lake. They are the only Cree member of the Athabasca Tribal Council.

Kee Tas Kee Now Tribal Council is based in Atikameg, Alberta with five members: The Loon River First Nation is headquartered in Red Earth Creek with reserves to the immediate west near Loon Lake. The Lubicon Lake Band is based in the settlement of Little Buffalo, approximately 80 km (50 mi) east of Peace River. The Peerless Trout First Nation is located in Peerless Lake on the Peerless Trout 238 reserve, about 45 km (28 mi) west of Red Earth Creek. Whitefish Lake First Nation is based in Atikameg, on the western shore of Utikuma Lake on the Utikoomak Lake 155 reserve, 61 km (38 mi) north of High Prairie. The Woodland Cree First Nation is located in the hamlet of Cadotte Lake on the Woodland Cree 226 reserve, 48 km (30 mi) northeast of Peace River.

Lesser Slave Lake Indian Regional Council, based in the town of Slave Lake, Alberta is, as the name suggests, a Tribal Council of First Nations surrounding Lesser Slave Lake. Member Nations include: The Driftpile First Nation, based in Driftpile, on the Drift Pile River 150 reserve, 70 km (43 mi) west of Slave Lake.

The Kapawe'no First Nation is headquartered at Grouard, which is near High Prairie. They have six reserves, predominately located west of Lesser Slave Lake. The Sawridge First Nation is based in Slave Lake and the two reserves, Sawridge 150G and 150H, are adjacent to the town. The Sucker Creek First Nation is based in Enilda, 10 km (6.2 mi) east of High Prairie, on the Sucker Creek 150A reserve. Finally, the Swan River First Nation, near Kinuso, 40 km (25 mi) west of Slave Lake, controls the Swan River 150E and Assineau River 150F reserves.

The Little Red River Cree Nation is based in the settlement of John D'Or Prairie, Alberta, 48 km (30 mi) east of Fort Vermilion, on the John D'Or Prairie 215 reserve. They are a member of the North Peace Tribal Council based in High Level.

The Mikisew Cree First Nation is based in the community of Fort Chipewyan on the western tip of Lake Athabasca, approximately 225 km (140 mi) north of Fort McMurray. They are not a member of a tribal council. Fort Chipewyan, one of the oldest European settlements in Alberta, was established in 1788 by the North West Company as a fur trading post.

Western Cree Tribal Council is based in Valleyview, Alberta. Cree member Nations are: Duncan's First Nation is based in Brownvale, adjacent to the reserve Duncan's 151A, 39 km (24 mi) southwest of Peace River. The Sturgeon Lake Cree Nation is on the Sturgeon Lake 154 reserve, 10 km (6.2 mi) west of Valleyview.

=== Plains Cree (Paskwāwiyiniwak / nēhiyawak) ===
==== Downstream people (Māmihkiyiniwak) ====
Battlefords Agency Tribal Chiefs is a tribal council located in North Battleford. Members are: Ahtahkakoop Cree Nation, Moosomin First Nation, Mosquito, Grizzly Bear's Head, Lean Man First Nations, Red Pheasant Cree Nation, Saulteaux First Nation, and Sweetgrass First Nation.

File Hills Qu'Appelle Tribal Council is a tribal council based in Fort Qu'Appelle. Kātēpwēwi-sīpīwiyiniwak Cree member Nations are: Little Black Bear First Nation, Muscowpetung Saulteaux Nation, Nekaneet Cree Nation, Okanese First Nation, Pasqua First Nation, Peepeekisis Cree Nation, Piapot First Nation, and Star Blanket Cree Nation

Meadow Lake Tribal Council is a tribal council based in Meadow Lake, Saskatchewan with nine member First Nations. The members with Plains Cree populations are Flying Dust First Nation, Makwa Sahgaiehcan First Nation, Ministikwan Lake Cree Nation, and Waterhen Lake First Nation

Saskatoon Tribal Council is, as the name suggests, a tribal council that is based in Saskatoon. Cree member nations are: Mistawasis Nêhiyawak, Muskeg Lake Cree Nation, Muskoday First Nation, and One Arrow First Nation.

Touchwood Agency Tribal Council, based in Punnichy, is a tribal council of four First Nations, collectively known as the Touchwood Hills Cree (Pasākanacīwiyiniwak). The Cree Nations are: Day Star First Nation, George Gordon First Nation, Kawacatoose First Nation, and Muskowekwan First Nation.

Yorkton Tribal Council is a tribal council based in Yorkton. Cree members are: Kahkewistahaw First Nation and Ocean Man First Nation.

Without affiliation with any tribal council: Beardy's and Okemasis' Cree Nation, Cowessess First Nation, Ochapowace Nation, Onion Lake Cree Nation, Pheasant Rump Nakota First Nation, White Bear First Nations.

==== Upstream people (Natimiyininiwak) ====
Agency Chiefs Tribal Council is a tribal council located in Spiritwood representing three First Nations: Pelican Lake First Nation, Big River First Nation, and Witchekan Lake First Nation.

Battlefords Tribal Council is based in North Battleford, The three member nations are Lucky Man Cree Nation, Little Pine First Nation, and Poundmaker Cree Nation.

Interlake Reserves Tribal Council is a tribal council based in Fairford, Manitoba. The council has six nations as members but the only Cree member is Peguis First Nation.

Without affiliation with any tribal council: Big Island Lake Cree Nation, Thunderchild First Nation.

Tribal Chiefs Ventures is a tribal council based in Edmonton with the following Cree members: Beaver Lake Cree Nation, Heart Lake First Nation, Frog Lake First Nation, and Kehewin Cree Nation.

==== Beaver Hills Cree (Amiskwacīwiyiniwak) ====
Maskwacis Cree Tribal Council is based in the unincorporated community of Maskwacis (formerly Hobbema), Alberta, located 70 km (43 mi) south of Edmonton. The members are Ermineskin Cree Nation, Louis Bull Tribe, Montana First Nation, and Samson Cree Nation. All four members have individual reserves that surround the community of Maskwacis: Ermineskin 138, Louis Bull 138B, Montana 139, Samson 137, and Samson 137A. And all four share the reserve of Pigeon Lake 138A, about 50 km (31 mi) to the northwest.

Yellowhead Tribal Council is based in Morinville. Member nations are: Alexander First Nation, Alexis Nakota Sioux First Nation, O'Chiese First Nation, and Sunchild First Nation. The Alexander First Nation is located on the reserve of Alexander 134, west of Morinville and 40 km (25 mi) northwest of Edmonton. Alexis Nakota Sioux First Nation is based on the Alexis 133 reserve, outside Glenevis, 70 km (43 mi) northwest of Edmonton. The O'Chiese First Nation and Sunchild First Nation control the reserves O'Chiese 203 and Sunchild 202 which are adjacent to each other 40 km (25 mi) northwest of Rocky Mountain House.

Not affiliated with any tribal council: Enoch Cree Nation, Paul Band, and Saddle Lake Cree Nation Enoch Cree Nation is located on their main reserve, Enoch Cree Nation 135, adjacent to the western boundary of the city of Edmonton. The Paul Band is based on the Wabamun 133A reserve, 58 km (36 mi) west of Edmonton. Saddle Lake Cree Nation is one of the most populous Nations in Canada with 11,235 people as of November 2021. The Nation is located in Saddle Lake, Alberta on the Saddle Lake 125 reserve, 24 km (15 mi) west of St. Paul, Alberta.

=== United States ===
Montana Indian reservations

Fort Peck Indian Reservation located near Fort Peck, Montana

Chippewa Cree on the Rocky Boy's Indian Reservation in northern Montana

Fort Belknap Indian Reservation located at Fort Belknap Agency, Montana

=== Other First Nations ===
The Papaschase, removed from land that now makes up southeast Edmonton, were a party to Treaty 6 but are not recognized by the Canadian government.

== Ethnobotany ==
The Cree use the pitch of Abies balsamea (balsam fir) for menstrual irregularity, and take an infusion of the bark and sometimes the wood for coughs. They use the pitch and grease used as an ointment for scabies and boils. They apply a poultice of pitch applied to cuts. They also use a decoction of pitch and sturgeon oil used for tuberculosis, and take an infusion of bark for tuberculosis. They also use the boughs to make brush shelters and use the wood to make paddles.

=== Hudson Bay Cree subgroup ===
The Hudson Bay Cree use a decoction of the leaves of Kalmia angustifolia (dwarf laurel) for diarrhea, but they consider the plant to be poisonous.

Hudson Bay Cree use decoction.

=== Woods Cree subgroup ===
The Woods Cree make use of Ribes glandulosum (skunk currant) using a decoction of the stem, either by itself or mixed with wild red raspberry, to prevent clotting after birth, eat the berries as food, and use the stem to make a bitter tea. They make use of Vaccinium myrtilloides (Canadian blueberry), using a decoction of leafy stems used to bring menstruation and prevent pregnancy, to make a person sweat, to slow excessive menstrual bleeding, to bring blood after childbirth, and to prevent miscarriage. They also use the berries to dye porcupine quills, eat the berries raw, make them into jam and eat it with fish and bannock, and boil or pound the sun-dried berries into pemmican. They use the berries of the minus subspecies of Vaccinium myrtilloides to colour porcupine quills, and put the firm, ripe berries on a string to wear as a necklace. They also incorporate the berries of the minus subspecies of Vaccinium myrtilloides into their cuisine. They store the berries by freezing them outside during the winter, mix the berries with boiled fish eggs, livers, air bladders and fat and eat them, eat the berries raw as a snack food, and stew them with fish or meat.

== Notable Cree people ==
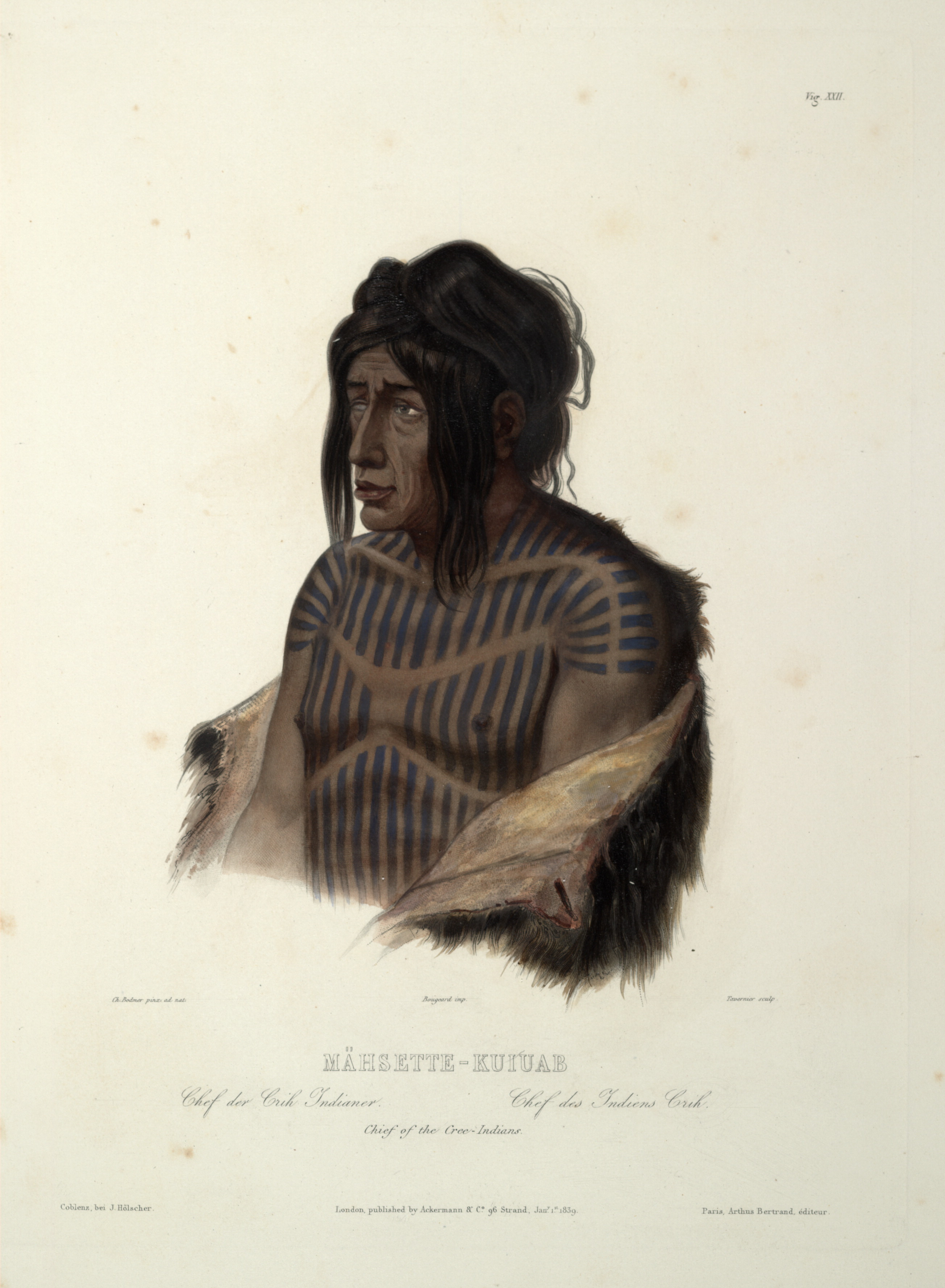
Mähsette Kuiuab, chief of the Cree, 1840–1843, Karl Bodmer.

- Janice Acoose, author, of Sakimay (Saulteaux) and Ninankawe Marival Métis ancestry
- Nathaniel Arcand (Alexander First Nation), actor
- Ethan Bear, (b. 1997), NHL hockey player for the Vancouver Canucks
- Irene Bedard, actress
- Craig Berube, Head coach of the Toronto Maple Leafs
- Robyn Bourgeois, author and academic
- Joe Buffalo, actor and skateboarder
- Ashley Callingbull (Enoch Cree Nation), 2015 Mrs. Universe winner, actress and first nations activist
- Harold Cardinal, writer, political leader, teacher, and lawyer
- Lance Cardinal, artist, presenter, CTV television personality, storyteller
- Lorne Cardinal, actor
- Tantoo Cardinal, actor
- Jonathan Cheechoo, NHL and KHL hockey player
- Shirley Cheechoo, actress, writer, and filmmaker
- Vern Cheechoo, musician
- Misha Nogha Chocholak, author
- Belinda Daniels, language teacher
- Billy Diamond, political leader, first Grand Chief of the Grand Council of the Crees (Eeyou Istchee)
- Neil Diamond, filmmaker
- Connie Fife, poet
- Theoren Fleury, retired NHL hockey player, humanitarian, spokesperson, and author
- Ralph Garvin Steinhauer, tenth Lieutenant Governor of Alberta and first Indigenous to hold that post.
- Edward Gamblin, musician
- Sebastian Gaskin, musician
- Mary Greyeyes (1920–2011), the first First Nations woman to join the Canadian Armed Forces
- Michael Greyeyes, actor
- Tomson Highway, playwright, librettist of the first Cree-language opera
- Tyson Houseman, actor
- Joseph Kakwinokanasum, writer
- Helen Knott, activist and author
- Asivak Koostachin, actor
- Jules Koostachin, writer and filmmaker
- Melina Laboucan-Massimo, climate justice advocate
- Cody Lightning, actor
- Wyatt C. Louis, singer-songwriter
- Lawrence Martin, musician and politician
- Ovide Mercredi, National chief of the Assembly of First Nations
- Val Napoleon, Indigenous law scholar
- Delia Opekokew, lawyer and activist
- Robert-Falcon Ouellette, A Cree Member of Parliament, played a pivotal role in promoting Indigenous languages including C-91 within Canada.
- Bronson Pelletier, actor
- Emily Riddle, poet
- Romeo Saganash, Member of Parliament for Abitibi—Baie-James—Nunavik—Eeyou, Quebec
- Paul Seesequasis, writer and journalist
- Wavell Starr, professional wrestler
- Roseanne Supernault, actress
- Clayton Thomas-Müller, activist and memoirist
- Richard Throssel (1882–1933), photographer
- Michelle Thrush, actor
- Loretta Todd, film director
- Gordon Tootoosis, actor
- Shane Yellowbird, country singer
- Alfred Young Man (Chippewa Cree Indians of the Rocky Boy's Reservation, b. 1948), educator, writer, curator, and artist

== See also ==
- Cree syllabics
- Wahkohtowin (Cree law)
- James Bay Cree hydroelectric conflict
- Michif
- Shaking tent ceremony
