= Swampy Cree Tribal Council =

Tribal council in eastern Manitoba, Canada

- Formation: 1976; 50 years ago
- Headquarters: The Pas, Manitoba; R9A 1K4
- Grand Chief: Nelson Genaille
- Website: swampycree.com

The Swampy Cree Tribal Council (SCTC) is a tribal council in northwest central Manitoba, Canada, representing eight Swampy Cree First Nation communities.

== Members ==
The SCTC represents eight First Nations communities:

- Chemawawin Cree Nation — Easterville
- Marcel Colomb First Nation — Lynn Lake
- Mathias Colomb First Nation — Pukatawagan
- Misipawistik Cree Nation — Grand Rapids
- Mosakahiken Cree Nation — Moose Lake
- Opaskwayak Cree Nation — Opaskwayak
- Sapotaweyak Cree Nation — Pelican Rapids
- Wuskwi Sipihk First Nation — Birch River

== Amenities ==
- Lynn Lake Airport
- Pukatawagan Airport
- Pukatawagen Water Aerodrome (defunct)
- OCN Storm (hockey team)
- Pelican Rapids Municipal Airport
