= Sapotaweyak Cree Nation =

Indian reserve in Manitoba, Canada

- Band No. 314
- Treaty: Treaty 4
- Headquarters: Pelican Rapids, Manitoba

Land
- Main reserve: Shoal River Indian Reserve 65A

Government
- Chief: Nelson Genaille

Tribal Council
- Swampy Cree Tribal Council

Website
- sapotaweyakcreenation.weebly.com

The Sapotaweyak Cree Nation (SCN; Cree: ᓵᐳᐦᑕᐍᔮᕽ, romanized: sâpohtawêyâhk) is a First Nations band government whose reserves are located in northern Manitoba, north-east of Swan River, approximately 400 kilometres northwest of Winnipeg. The community is mainly Cree, but has a mixture of Plains Cree, Swampy Cree, and Saulteaux languages, a unique dialect shared with Wuskwi Sipihk First Nation to the southwest. They have a number of dispersed reserves, most of which are along the shores of Lake Winnipegosis. The main centre of the community is Shoal River Indian Reserve 65A, located adjacent to Pelican Rapids (known as the "Métis Side" to the locals). About half the community's population resides on the reserve while the other half live off reserve.

== Infrastructure ==
In a March 24, 2016 CBC interview, Chief Genaille said that SCN would need "$29 million to address immediate housing, water treatment and education needs."

=== Housing ===
According to a 2011 report published as part of a collaborative project with SCN, the Assembly of Manitoba Chiefs, and the University of Manitoba, SCN's location near the river and lake results in flooding in both the spring and fall. At that time, the implications for housing expansion relate[d] to future development outside of the floodplain, preserving biodiversity, lake and river access, while maintaining traditional values, uses and settlement forms." Chief Genaille told CBC News in 2016 that SCN needed 50 homes immediately, and another 200 over the long term. He estimated a cost of $135,000 per house. A housing report had identified "severe mould and structure problems".

=== Water and waste treatment ===
INAC reported in 2004 that the water source for SCN was the Shoal River or Dawson Bay. In 2004, following water treatment and chlorination, water was either distributed by pipes or by water trucks to individual homes. Water samples from the new $14.2-million water treatment plant, which includes "intake, intake pumphouse with wet well, outfall, and 1,350 m3 capacity below grade concrete reservoir" met the required drinking water standards and resulted in the lifting of the long-term drinking water advisory on May 20, 2021.

=== Education ===
When the First Nations–operated Neil Dennis Kematch Memorial School opened in 2007, First Nations members could choose to attend the levels K4-8 at that school or off reserve. In 2016, Indigenous Services Canada, then known as Indigenous and Northern Affairs Canada, provided $4,500 in funding per student in the local school. Chief Genaille compared this to the $13,000 for the "same student to go off-reserve to go to a public school." With such limited funds, SCN "can't afford specialized programs and often has a shortage of supplies such as books. "We also can't accommodate special needs care … and most of our high school students aren't ready for university, because I can't afford specialized teachers for [subjects] like sciences, math and computer programming...Thee community also needs more funds to pay teachers a competitive wage...When you only have in the budget to afford a teacher at $26,000 a year, we can't meet education standards that say we are obligated to pay them up to $40,000. You know, we can't afford them."

=== Health care ===
The Shoal River Health Office First Nations and Inuit Health Branch in Pelican Rapids provides health care to the SCN community members. A community health representative is onsite and the nearest hospital is in The Pas, Manitoba.

== Economic base ==
In 2004, SCN's economic base included "fishing, trapping, cattle ranching and logging operations."

== History ==
SCN is signatory to Treaty 4 which was signed in 1874. In 1976, they became part of the Swampy Cree Tribal Council, which also includes the Chemawawin Cree Nation, Mathias Colomb First Nation, Misipawistik Cree Nation, Mosakahiken Cree Nation, Opaskwayak Cree Nation, Sapotaweyak Cree Nation, and the Wuskwi Sipihk First Nation. In September 2016, they became a signatory of the Buffalo Treaty. About 900 people had to evacuate because of wildfires on May 20, 2018, and were able to return on June 5. During the COVID-19 pandemic, Chief Nelson Genaille reported that of the 260 households in the community, there were 49 active cases and 313 others self-isolating in December 2020.

=== Treaty and aboriginal hunting rights ===
In 2021, the SCN and the Swampy Cree Tribal Council (Note: The Swampy Cree Tribal Council includes the Sapotaweyak Cree Nation, Chemawawin Cree Nation, Mathias Colomb First Nation, Misipawistik Cree Nation, Mosakahiken Cree Nation, Opaskwayak Cree Nation, and Wuskwi Sipihk First Nation) are challenging the 2011 Manitoba Moose Conservation Closure Regulation. As the moose population declined significantly by 2011, the conservation closures were implemented by the province of Manitoba to allow their moose numbers to recover. A decade later the moose population has not recovered and the Treaty hunting rights have not been reinstated. In a joint press October 2021 release, the SCN and the Tribal Council said that Manitoba had "done more since 2011 to cause harm to this province's moose population than those hunting moose on First Nation land." According to the Winnipeg Sun, "Since the regulation came into effect, Manitoba permitted Louisiana Pacific to clear-cut woods and build logging roads, supported transmission lines, licensed exploration, established snowmobile trails and authorized other development, destroying moose habitat and undermining conservation efforts. As a result, the Moose populations have not recovered and only a limited harvest has been allowed." The challenge is in response to the arrest of Kirk Kematch by Natural Resource Officers in October 2020, when Kematch killed a moose in a ceremonial hunt to honour his recently deceased uncle. Kematch was exercising "his Treaty and Aboriginal Rights, and following the customs and traditions of Sapotaweyak Cree Nation."

=== Manitoba Hydro's Bipole III transmission line on Sapotaweyak ancestral land ===
In 2015, the SCN attempted to prevent Manitoba Hydro from clearing a "66-metre wide right-of-way along approximately 200 kilometres" on Sapotaweyak ancestral land which includes burial grounds and spiritual sites, stretching from The Pas to Swan River for the Bipole III transmission line. The area, known as N4, is covered under a 1997 agreement on treaty land entitlement which calls for proper consultation between the province and the community. Judge Donald P. Bryk dismissed the claim. The Bipole III transmission line project was undertaken to respond to the anticipated increase in amount of electricity needed with two pipelines under consideration, including TransCanada's since cancelled Energy East crude oil pipeline, according to Manitoba Hydro's Ed Wojczynski.

== Indian Reserves ==
Indian Reserves assigned to the band are:

- Channel Island Sapotaweyak Cree Nation Indian Reserve — 13.59 km^{2} (3,360 acres).
- Overflowing River Sapotaweyak Cree Nation Indian Reserve — 4.69 km^{2} (1,160 acres)
- Pelican Rapids Access Road Phase 1 Indian Reserve — 84.1 km^{2} (20,800 acres)
- PTH 10 Sapotaweyak Cree Nation Indian Reserve — 580,000 m^{2} (140 acres)
- Sapotaweyak Cree Nation Indian Reserve — 282.048 km^{2} (69,696 acres)
- Sapotaweyak Cree Nation - Spruce Island Indian Reserve — 18.48 km^{2} (4,570 acres)
- Shoal River Indian Reserve No. 65A — 3.922 km^{2} (969 acres); 83 km south of The Pas.
- Shoal River Indian Reserve No. 65B — 9.551 km^{2} (2,360 acres); at Steep Rock Point, Dawson Bay, Lake Winnipegosis.
- Shoal River Indian Reserve No. 65F — 441,000 m^{2} (109 acres); at Dawson Bay, Lake Winnipegosis.

The following reserve is shared with 32 other bands, all signatories to Treaty 4.

- Treaty Four Reserve Grounds Indian Reserve No. 77 — 379,000 m^{2} (94 acres); adjacent to and west of Fort Qu'Appelle, Saskatchewan.
