= Swampy Cree =

Division of the Cree Nation

Swampy Cree (Nèhinaw)
- Descended from: Cree
- Branches: Western Swampy Cree, Eastern Swampy Cree
- Language: Swampy Cree language

Western Swampy Cree
- Language: N-dialect

Eastern Swampy Cree Omaškêkowak
- Language: eastern dialect of the Swampy Cree language, which kept the s/š distinction

nêhinaw / ininîw "Indigenous person" / "human being"
- Person: W: nêhinaw ᓀᐦᐃᓇᐤ; E: ininîw ᐃᓂᓃᐤ
- People: W: nêhinawak ᓀᐦᐃᓇᐘᐠ; E: ininîwak ᐃᓂᓃᐘᐠ
- Language: W: nêhinawêwin ᓀᐦᐃᓇᐌᐎᐣ; E: ininîmowin ᐃᓂᓃᒧᐎᓐ; Hand Talk
- Country: W: nêhinawaskiy ᓀᐦᐃᓇᐘᐢᑭᐩ; E: ininîwaskiy ᐃᓂᓂᐗᔅᑭᔾ

Map of Cree lands; the Swampy Cree are colored gray.

The Swampy Cree people, also known by their autonyms Néhinaw, Maskiki Wi Iniwak, Mushkekowuk, Maškékowak, Maskegon or Maskekon (and therefore also Muskegon and Muskegoes) or by exonyms including West Main Cree, Lowland Cree, and Homeguard Cree, are a division of the Cree Nation occupying lands located in northern Manitoba, along the Saskatchewan River in northeastern Saskatchewan, along the shores of Hudson Bay and adjoining interior lands south and west as well as territories along the shores of Hudson and James Bay in Ontario. They are geographically and to some extent culturally split into two main groupings, and therefore speak two dialects of the Swampy Cree language, which is an "n-dialect":

- Western Swampy Cree called themselves: Mushkego, Mushkegowuk (or Maškēkowak), also called Lowland (Half-Homeguard) Cree, speak the western dialect of the Swampy Cree language, while the s/š distinction is kept in the eastern dialect, the western dialect have merged both into s
- Eastern Swampy Cree / Western James Bay Cree called themselves: Omaškêkowak, Omushkego, Omushkegowak, together with the Moose Cree also called Lowland Cree, Lowland (Homeguard) Cree, West Main Cree, James Bay Mushkego, because they were living along the western shores of the Hudson and James Bay they were oft also known as Western James Bay Cree, reflecting their position in contrast to the (Eastern) James Bay Cree, speak the eastern dialect of the Swampy Cree language, which kept the s/š distinction

== Name ==
John S. Long's book Treaty No. 9: Making the Agreement to Share the Land in Far Northern Ontario in 1905 describes a group of Elders deliberating on the name their people used to refer to themselves:

Mushkegowuk can mean two things. One refers to the muskeg. Long ago, the Ojibway Indians from the west came to see us, and they saw that we were living along the coast. So they named us Mushkego Indians. The Indians who lived here were very strong and powerful, and that is the second reason we were given the name Mushkegowuk. Our grandfathers unloaded the Hudson's Bay Company ships when they came in. The word Mushkegowuk also reminds us of our traditional religion, when we use powerful spirits to protect ourselves.

== European contact ==
In Manitoba, The Swampy Cree's first recorded contact with Europeans was in 1682 at the mouth of the Nelson and Hayes rivers in northern Manitoba by a Hudson's Bay Company party travelling about 100 mi (160 km) inland. In Ontario, contact with the Swampy Cree (Omuskegowuk) is in the early 1600s with Henry Hudson's arrival into James Bay.

== First Nations ==
Historically, the Cree nations in the central part of the Cree continuum were classified by their relationship to Hudson Bay and James Bay: Lowland (Homeguard) Cree who were found along the coast, Lowland (Half-Homeguard) Cree who seasonally transitioned between the coast and the interior, and the Upland Cree in the deep interior who often were intermixed with the Ojibwe. West of these Lowland and Upland Cree were the Woodland and Plains Cree. Linguistically, the Cree are divided by their general language features, where the Cree nations in the central part of the Cree continuum are classified as "th-Cree", "n-Cree" and "l-Cree", from west to east; Cree traditionally associated with the Woodland Cree make no distinction between "s" and "š", while the Lowland and Upland Cree do. Today, together with the "n-Cree" dialect-speaking Woodland Cree, those who live in the Lowlands and Uplands who speak the "n-Cree" dialect are called "Swampy Cree", but culturally Moose Cree (the Cree speaking the "l-dialect") and other peoples of the Upland including the Oji-Cree occasionally self-identify as being "Swampy Cree".

West Swampy Cree

- Winnipeg Cree (historical)
  - Chemawawin Cree Nation (also Rocky Cree)
  - Cumberland House Cree Nation
  - Fisher River Cree Nation
  - Fort Severn First Nation
  - Fox Lake Cree Nation
  - Marcel Colomb First Nation (also Rocky Cree)
  - Mathias Colomb First Nation (also Rocky Cree)
  - Misipawistik Cree Nation
  - Mosakahiken Cree Nation
  - Opaskwayak Cree Nation
  - Red Earth First Nation
  - Sapotaweyak Cree Nation (also Plains Cree and Saulteaux)
  - Shamattawa Cree Nation
  - Shoal Lake Cree Nation
  - Tataskweyak Cree Nation
  - War Lake First Nation
  - Wuskwi Sipihk First Nation
  - York Factory First Nation

East Swampy Cree

- Albany River Cree (historical)
  - Fort Albany First Nation (also Ojibwe)
  - Kashechewan First Nation (also Moose Cree)
- Attawapiskat River Cree (historical)
  - Attawapiskat First Nation
- Mattagami River Cree (historical)
  - Flying Post First Nation (also Ojibwe)
- Nipigon Cree (historical)
- Severn River Cree (historical)
  - (see also Oji-Cree)
- Winisk River Cree (historical)
  - Weenusk First Nation
  - (see also Oji-Cree)

Moose Cree

- Abitibi River Cree (historical)
  - Abitibiwinni First Nation (also Algonquin and Ojibwe)
  - Wahgoshig First Nation (also Algonquin and Ojibwe)
- Moose River Cree (historical)
  - Brunswick House First Nation (also Ojibwe)
  - Chapleau Cree First Nation
  - Constance Lake First Nation (also Oji-Cree and Ojibwe)
  - Kashechewan First Nation (also Swampy Cree)
  - Matachewan First Nation (also Ojibwe)
  - Missanabie Cree First Nation (also Ojibwe)
  - Moose Cree First Nation
  - Taykwa Tagamou Nation
- Lake Nipigon Cree (historical)
- Piscotagami River Cree (historical)
- Rainy Lake Cree (historical)
- Mishkeegogamang First Nation (also Cree, Ojibwe)

== Ethnonyms ==
Reflecting either Swampy Cree (O)maškêko(wak) "Swampy(-ies)", or Odawa (O)mashkiigo(wag) "Swampy(-ies)"

- Mashkégous.—Petitot in Can. Rec. Sci., I, 48, 1884.
- Maskègowuk.—Hutchins (1770) quoted by Richardson, Arct. Exped. II, 37, 1851.
- Masquikoukiaks.—Prise de Possession (1671) in Perrot, Mémoire, 293, 1864.
- Masquikoukioeks.—Prise de Possession (1671) in Margry, Déc., I, 97, 1875.
- Meskigouk.—Long, Exped. St Peter's R., II, 151, 1824.
- Mis-Keegoes.—Ross, Fur Hunters, II, 220, 1855.
- Muskeg.--Hind. Red R. Exped., I, 112, 1860.
- Muskeggouck.—West, Jour., 19, 1824.
- Muskegoe.—Tanner, Narr., 45 1830.
- Muskegoag.—Tanner, Narr., 315 1830.
- Muskegons.—Galatin "A Synopsis of the Indian Tribes in North America", in Archæologia Americana : Transactions and Collections of the American Antiquarian Society, II, 24, 1836.
- Muskigos.—Maximillian, Trav., II, 28, 1841.
- Musk-keeg-oes.—Warren (1852) in Minnesota Historical Society Collections, V, 45, 1885.
- Mustegans.—Hind, Labrador Penin., II, 16, 1863.
- Mashkegons.—Belcourt (ca. 1850) in Minnesota Historical Society Collections, I, 227, 1872.
- Maskigoes.—Schoolcraft, Indian Tribes, II, 36, 1852.
- Muscagoes.—Harmon, Jour., 84, 1820.
- Mus-conogee.—Schermerhorn (1812) in Massachusetts Historical Society Collections, 2d s., II, 11, 1814.
- Muscononges.—Pike, Exped., app. to pt. 1, 64, 1810.
- Muskeags.—Schoolcraft. Indian Tribes, VI, 33, 1857.
- Muskagoes.—Harmon (1801) quoted by Jones, Ojebway Inds., 166, 1861.
- Mus-ka-go-wuk.—Morgan. Systems of Consanguinity and Affinity of the Human Family, 287, 1871.

Reflecting Swampy Cree (O)maškêko-ininiw(ak) "Swamp People"

- Mashkegonhyrinis.—Bacquerville de la Potherie, Hist. Am, I, 168, 1783.
- Maskigonehirinis.—Dobbs, Hudson Bay, 25, 1744.
- Miskogonhirinis.—Dobbs, Hudson Bay, 23, 1744.

Reflecting Ojibwe (O)mashkiigoo(g) "Swampy(-ies)"

- Muskeegoo.—Jones, Ojebway Inds., 178, 1861.
- Muskego Ojibways.—Warren (1852) in Minnesota Historical Society Collections, V, 378, 1885.
- Muskegoo.—Canada. Department of Indian Affairs (common form).
- Omaskekok.—Belcourt (ca. 1850) in Minnesota Historical Society Collections, I, 227-8, 1885.
- Omush-ke-goag.—Warren (1852) in Minnesota Historical Society Collections, V, 33, 1885.
- Omushke-goes.—Warren (1852) in Minnesota Historical Society Collections, V, 85, 1885.

Reflecting a translation

- Cree of the lowlands.—Morgan, Systems of Consanguinity and Affinity of the Human Family, 287, 1871.
- People of the Lowlands.—Morgan, Systems of Consanguinity and Affinity of the Human Family, 287, 1871.
- Savannas.—Chauvignerie (1836) in New York Documents of Colonial History, IX, 1054, 1855.
- Savanois.—Charlevoix, Nouv.Fr., 277, 1744.
- Swampee.—Reid in Jour. Anthrop. Inst of G. Br., VII, 107, 1874.
- Swampies.—M'Lean, Hudson Bay, II, 19, 1824.
- Swampy Crees.—Franklin, Journ. to Polar Sea, 38, 1824.
  - Swampy Creek Indians.—Hind, Labrador Penin., I, 8, 1863 (for 'Swampy Cree Indians').
- Swampy Krees.—Keane in Stanford, Compend., 536, 1878.
- Swampys.—Hind, Labrador Penin., I, 323, 1863.

Other

- Big-Heads.—Donnelly in Canada. Department of Indian Affairs, Annual Report for 1883, pt. 1, 10, 1884.
- Coast Crees.—Back, Arct. Land Exped., app., 194, 1836.
- Waub-ose.—Warren (1852) in Minnesota Historical Society Collections, V, 86, 1885 (Waabooz ('rabbit'): Ojibwe name, referring to their peaceful character; applied also to the Bois Forte Band).
