= Pelican Rapids, Manitoba =

Coordinates: 52.745°N 100.691°W

Pelican Rapids is a community in the Canadian province of Manitoba. The Shoal River 65A Indian Reserve is adjacent to the community and is home to some members of the Sapotaweyak Cree Nation.

== Demographics ==
In the 2021 Census of Population conducted by Statistics Canada, Pelican Rapids had a population of 64 living in 13 of its 15 total private dwellings, a change of -11.1% from its 2016 population of 72. With a land area of 3.14 km^{2} (1.21 sq mi), it had a population density of 20.4/km^{2} (52.8/sq mi) in 2021.
