= Misipawistik Cree Nation =

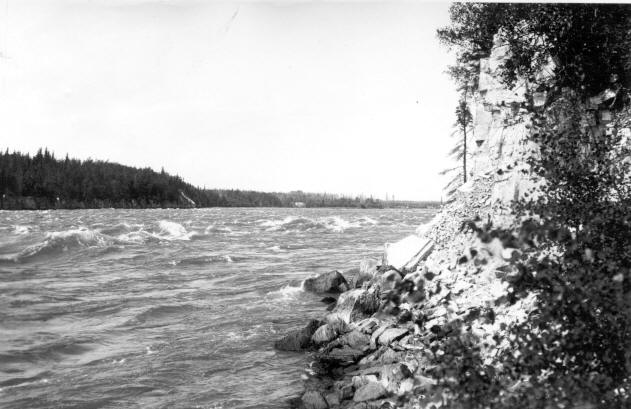
- Grand Rapids in 1921

- Location within Manitoba
- Coordinates: 53°09′36″N 99°14′01″W
- Country: Canada
- Province: Manitoba

Government
  - Federal riding: Churchill
  - Prov. riding: Swan River

Area
  - Total: 16.97 km^{2} (6.55 sq mi)

Population (2011)
  - Total: 716
  - Density: 42.2/km^{2} (109/sq mi)
- Time zone: UTC-6 (CST)
- Postal Code: R0C 1E0
- Area code: 204
- Misipawistik Cree Nation
- People: Swampy Cree
- Treaty: Treaty 5
- Headquarters: Grand Rapids, Manitoba

Government
- Chief: Heidi Cook
- Council: Annie Ballantyne; Yvonne Ballantyne; Bobby Ballantyne

Website
- misipawistik.com

Misipawistik Cree Nation (MCN; Cree: ᒥᓯ ᐹᐏᐢᑎᐠ, romanized: misi-pâwistik, lit. 'at the big rapids'; formerly Grand Rapids First Nation) is a Cree community in northern Manitoba. Misipawistik in the local Cree language means 'Rushing Rapids', which was once a historical Canadian landmark before the construction of the Manitoba Hydro-electric Dam in the late 1950s.

MCN is located near Grand Rapids, Manitoba, 400 kilometres north of Winnipeg, Manitoba, and is accessible via PTH 6. It is situated at the mouth of the Saskatchewan River as it runs into Lake Winnipeg. Misipawistik Cree Nation has one reserve (Grand Rapids 33) with an area of 1852.30 hectares and is governed by a chief and three councillors. The current Chief is Heidi Cook. It is a member of the Swampy Cree Tribal Council with offices in The Pas.

== History ==
MCN is a Cree-speaking community in Northern Manitoba, Canada. The people of Misipawistik are largely ancestral descendants of indigenous Cree peoples who have populated the Canadian Shield region of northern and central Canada for 10,000 to 35,000 years. Cree peoples had been migrating to the area during the summer seasons for thousands of years prior to establishing a year-round settlement with the advent of the North American fur trade. Cree and Mixed families would continue to follow their seasonal cycles well into the latter half of the 20th century.

Many famous Canadian figures would pass through Misipawistik on the way through to Western Canada as transportation at the time relied heavily on waterways prior to the late 1800s. Notably, Pierre La Vérendrye would travel through and open up Fort Bourbon in 1741. By the late 1700s, Misipawistik would already be fully immersed in the North American Fur Trade. The area was considered a crucial point in the Fur Trade endeavour as most water-bound routes into the Northwest converged at this site. It was during this era that Misipawistik would become a year-round settlement for both Cree and Métis families as the Fur Trade would provide the economic means for some families to reside in the area year-round.

During the 19th century, the Fur Trade would start to dwindle while other economic activities would begin to emerge. Fishing and trapping started to represent how families would sustain themselves economically and this would continue well into the 20th century.

=== Treaty 5 Adhesion ===
The Cree people of Misipawistik had signed Treaty 5 in September 1875. According to Alexander Morris, the rationale behind the negotiation was due in part because of improvements in boating technology, but also because of the economic necessity of the region. As he would state in his self-written book, The Treaties of Canada with the Indians of Manitoba and the North-west Territories: "The progress of navigation by steamer on Lake Winnipeg, the establishment of Missions and of saw milling enterprises, the discovery of minerals on the shores and vicinity of the lake as well as migration of the Norway House Indians."

Initially, the Cree people negotiating an adhesion to Treaty 5 wished to have their reserve lands cover both sides of the Saskatchewan River entering into the Lake Winnipeg, but were nonetheless convinced to accept the Southern shore. The reason is still unclear as to how these negotiations played out.

=== National Cree Gathering 2007 ===
Misipawistik Cree Nation hosted the 12th annual National Cree Gathering, a week-long event where Cree people from all over Canada and the United States came together to promote, preserve, and proclaim their traditional ceremonial practices, their distinct languages, and their ways of life.

A central component of the National Cree Gathering is the Unity Run which involves youth from multiple participating communities. These youth run the journey from the previous hosting community to the next hosting community. In certain years, this journey can encompass over 2000 kilometres. This year, the youth will be running from Moose Factory, Ontario, to Misipawistik Cree Nation.

== Demographics ==
With a population of approximately 716 members, Misipawistik is a small community compared to the average First Nations community. The population consists of Cree, Metis people, and other First Nations people. Cree and English are the two languages most widely used.

== Notable members ==
- Ovide Mercredi
- Marlyn Cook
- Darla Contois, writer, actress
