= Marcel Colomb First Nation =

Coordinates: 56.853°N 101.049°W

Marcel Colomb First Nation ᓇᒦᐏ ᓵᑲᐦᐃᑲᐣ Band No. 328
- Treaty: Treaty 6
- Headquarters: Lynn Lake, Manitoba

Land
- Main reserve: Black Sturgeon Reserve

Population (2021)
- On reserve: 81
- Off reserve: 647
- Total population: 728

Government
- Chief: Douglas Hart

Marcel Colomb First Nation (MCFN) (Cree: ᓇᒦᐏ ᓵᑲᐦᐃᑲᐣ, namîwi-sâkahikan), Band #328, is a First Nations Band of approximately 449 Registered Swampy Cree (Maškēkowak / nēhinawak) and Rocky Cree (Asinīskāwiyiniwak) located in the area of Lynn Lake, Manitoba, Canada.

Marcel Colomb First Nation is affiliated with the Swampy Cree Tribal Council.

== Reserve ==
Location of Marcel Colomb First Nation in Manitoba

The MCFN reserve is Black Sturgeon Reserve. The reserve is located on Hughes Lake, approximately 30 kilometres (19 mi) east of the town of Lynn Lake. Only 81 band members live on this reserve.

== Heritage ==
The Rock Cree people of the Black Sturgeon Falls Reserve are ancestral descendants of Indigenous peoples originally from Pukatawagan and other areas within the Nickel Belt. These Indigenous people have populated the Canadian Shield region of northern and central Canada since the retreat of the glaciers about 10,000 years ago.

== Infrastructure ==
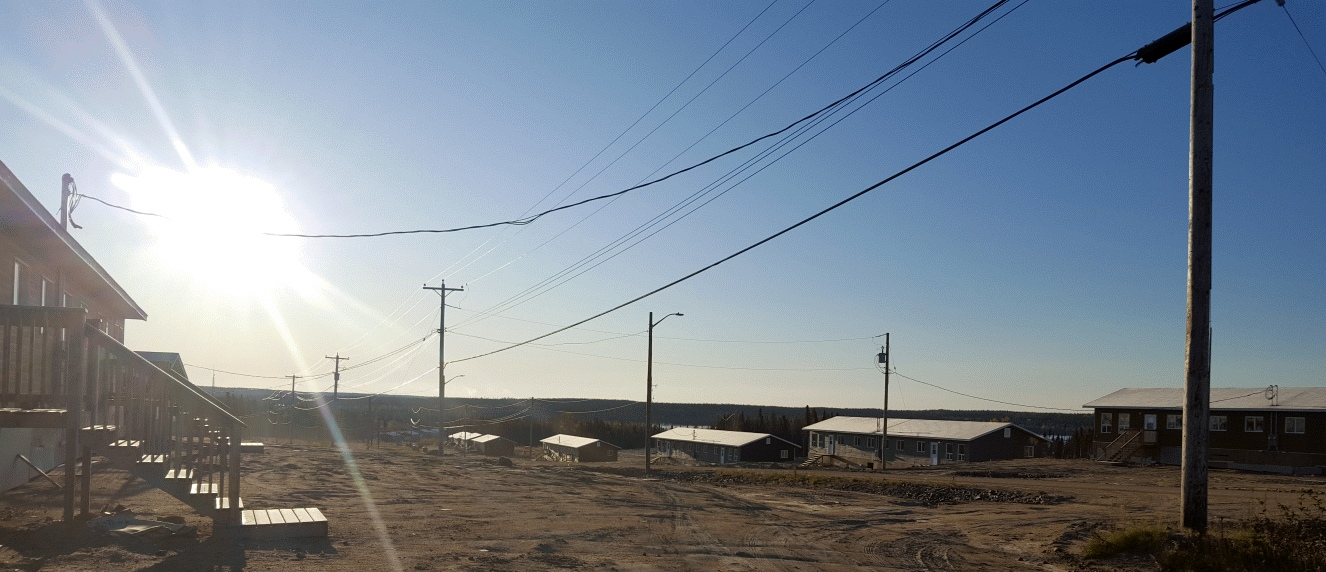
Marcel Colomb First Nation

Located within the reserve is the band office (built in 2023) and nursing station and Jordan's Principle center, water treatment plant, 55 houses, a bunk house which serves as a community center, and many other community infrastructure projects under development.

== Geology ==
In 2016, Alamos Gold procured the Lynn Lake Gold Project, located within the traditional territory of MCFN. At a signing ceremony in 2023, the MCFN and Alamos Gold came to an agreement that will be an “economic driver” for the band according to John McCluskey, CEO of Alamos Gold. Officials with the MCFN stated the agreement will provide jobs, job training, revenue sharing and allow for more environmental protections.

== Band administration ==
Chief: Douglas Hart - elected: 01/30/2024 current re-elected January 2024

Councillors:

- Evelyn Sinclair
- Priscilla Colomb
- Amanda Castel

== Previous chiefs ==
Previous leaders of the Marcel Colomb First Nation are:

- Andrew (Hank) Colomb, served between 13 July 2003 to 10 July 2015
- Douglas Hart, served between 11 July 2015 to 31 January 2016, 30 January 2024-current
- Priscilla Colomb, elected: 1 February 2016 to 1 January 2020
