= Wuskwi Sipihk First Nation =

Wuskwi Sipihk First Nation (Cree ᐘᐢᑿᐩ ᓰᐲᕽ waskway-sîpîhk, meaning: at the Birch River) is a Swampy Cree First Nations band government whose reserve community is located northeast Birch River, Manitoba, along the western shores of Swan Lake. The Rural Municipality of Mountain (North) forms the western and southern borders of the reserve. As of April, 2011, the First Nation had a total registered population of 623 people, of which 197 people lived on their own Indian reserve.

== Government ==
The current Chief for the First Nation is Elwood Zastre.

== History ==
In September 2016, they became a signatory of the Buffalo Treaty.

== Reserves ==
- 1,524.20 hectares (3,766.4 acres) Wuskwi Sipihk First Nation No. 1
- 91.50 hectares (226.1 acres) Wuskwi Sipihk First Nation 2
- 47.50 hectares (117.4 acres) Wuskwi Sipihk First Nation 3A
- 2.20 hectares (5.4 acres) Wuskwi Sipihk First Nation 3B
- 54.90 hectares (135.7 acres) Wuskwi Sipihk First Nation 3C
- 66.40 hectares (164.1 acres) Wuskwi Sipihk First Nation 3D
- 20.20 hectares (49.9 acres) Wuskwi Sipihk First Nation 3E
- 15 hectares (37 acres) Wuskwi Sipihk First Nation 3F
- 191 hectares (470 acres) Wuskwi Sipihk 4
- 1,474.80 hectares (3,644.3 acres) Wuskwi Sipihk 5
- 109.40 hectares (270.3 acres) Wuskwi Sipihk 6
- 5,850 hectares (14,500 acres) Wuskwi Sipihk No. 7
- 746.70 hectares (1,845.1 acres) Wuskwi Sipihk 8
- 923.70 hectares (2,282.5 acres) Swan Lake 65C, which serves as their main reserve, containing the settlement of Indian Birch at 52°30′40″N 100°52′00″W.
- 37.10 hectares (91.7 acres) Treaty Four Reserve Grounds 77, near Fort Qu'Appelle, Saskatchewan, shared with 32 other First Nations.
