= Mosakahiken Cree Nation =

Moose Lake 31A
- Indian reserve
- Location within Manitoba
- Coordinates: 53°42′33″N 100°19′32″W
- Country: Canada
- Province: Manitoba
- Census division: No. 21
- Region: Northern

Area
  - Land: 3.36 km^{2} (1.30 sq mi)
- Elevation: 260 m (840 ft)

Population (2016)
  - Total: 1,124
  - Density: 334.9/km^{2} (867/sq mi)
- Time zone: UTC−5 (CST)
  - Summer (DST): UTC−6 (CDT)
- Mosakahiken Cree Nation
- Headquarters: Moose Lake, Manitoba

Land
- Main reserve: Moose Lake 31A
- Reserves: Moose Lake 31C, 31D, 31G, and 31J

Government
- Chief: Vine Patchenose

Tribal Council
- Swampy Cree Tribal Council

The Mosakahiken Cree Nation (Cree: ᒨᓵᑲᐦᐃᑲᐣ môsâkahikan) is a First Nations located around the community of Moose Lake in northern Manitoba.

Its main reserve is Moose Lake 31A; other reserve lands in its possession include: Moose Lake 31C, Moose Lake 31D, Moose Lake 31G, and Moose Lake 31J. They are members of the Swampy Cree Tribal Council.
