= North Saskatchewan Region =

- Land-use framework region
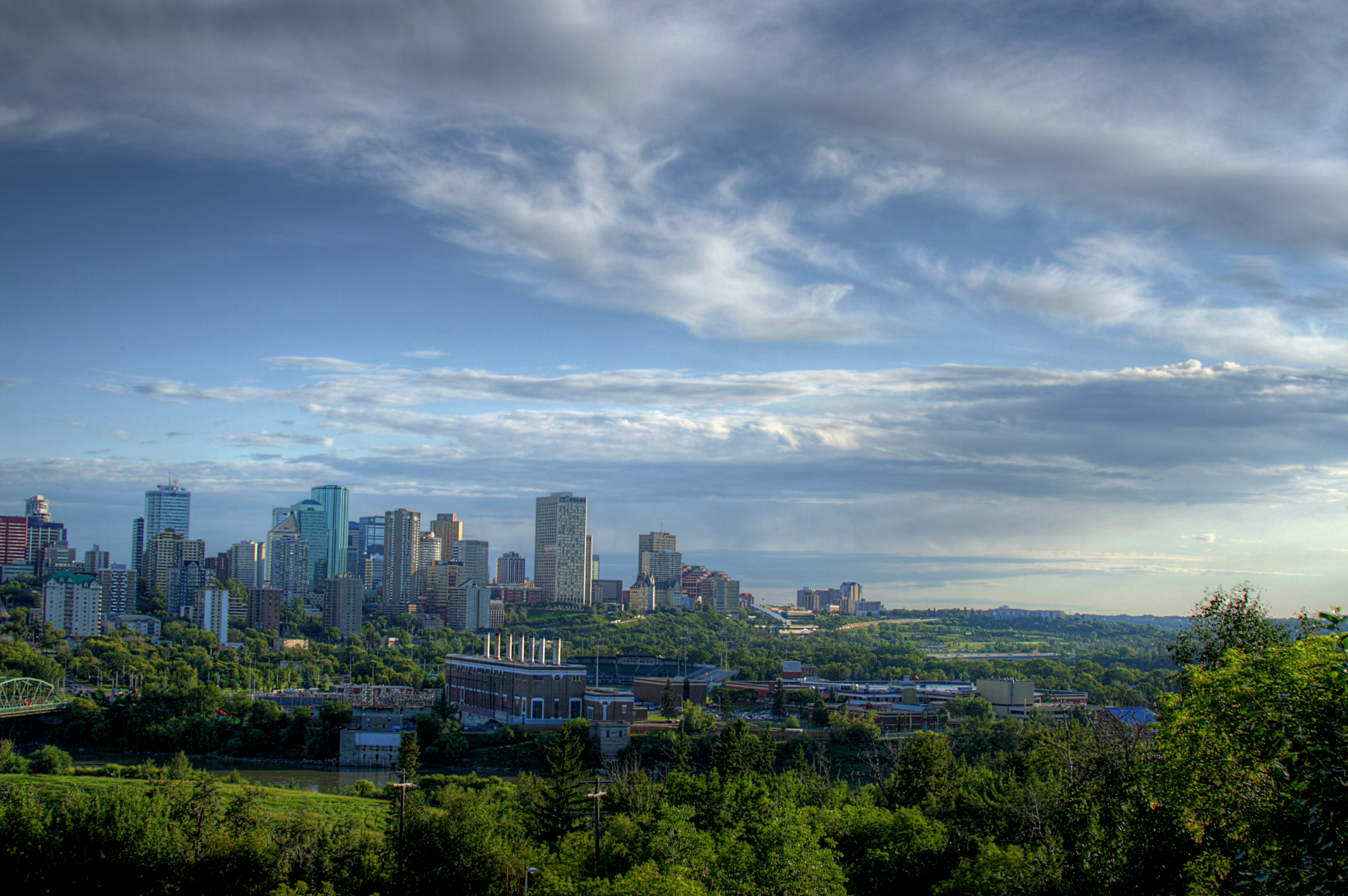
- Edmonton's river valley

- Location in Alberta
- Largest population centres: Edmonton; Lloydminster; Camrose; Wetaskiwin

Government
  - Parent authority: Alberta Environment and Parks

Area
  - Total: 85,781 km^{2} (33,120 sq mi)

Population (2016)
  - Total: 1,543,360
  - Density: 17.992/km^{2} (46.599/sq mi)

The North Saskatchewan Region is a land-use framework region in northern Alberta, Canada. One of seven in the province, each is intended to develop and implement a regional plan, complementing the planning efforts of member municipalities in order to coordinate future growth. Corresponding roughly to major watersheds while following municipal boundaries, these regions are managed by Alberta Environment and Parks.

== Communities ==
The following municipalities are contained in the North Saskatchewan Region.

Cities

- Beaumont
- Camrose
- Edmonton
- Fort Saskatchewan
- Leduc
- Lloydminster
- St. Albert
- Spruce Grove
- Wetaskiwin

Urban service areas

- Sherwood Park

Towns

- Banff
- Bashaw
- Bon Accord
- Bruderheim
- Calmar
- Daysland
- Devon
- Drayton Valley
- Elk Point
- Gibbons
- Hardisty
- Killam
- Lamont
- Legal
- Millet
- Morinville
- Mundare
- Provost
- Redwater
- Rocky Mountain House
- Sedgewick
- Smoky Lake
- St. Paul
- Stony Plain
- Thorsby
- Tofield
- Two Hills
- Vegreville
- Vermilion
- Viking
- Wainwright

Villages

- Alliance
- Amisk
- Andrew
- Bawlf
- Bittern Lake
- Breton
- Caroline
- Chauvin
- Chipman
- Czar
- Dewberry
- Edberg
- Edgerton
- Ferintosh
- Forestburg
- Hay Lakes
- Heisler
- Holden
- Hughenden
- Innisfree
- Irma
- Kitscoty
- Lougheed
- Mannville
- Marwayne
- Myrnam
- Paradise Valley
- Rosalind
- Ryley
- Spring Lake
- Vilna
- Wabamun
- Warburg
- Waskatenau

Summer villages

- Argentia Beach
- Betula Beach
- Burnstick Lake
- Crystal Springs
- Golden Days
- Grandview
- Horseshoe Bay
- Itaska Beach
- Kapasiwin
- Lakeview
- Ma-Me-O Beach
- Norris Beach
- Point Alison
- Poplar Bay
- Seba Beach
- Silver Beach
- Sundance Beach

Métis settlements

- Buffalo Lake
- Kikino

Municipal districts

- Beaver County
- Brazeau County
- Camrose County
- Clearwater County
- Flagstaff County
- Lamont County
- Leduc County
- County of Minburn No. 27
- Parkland County
- Municipal District of Provost No. 52
- County of St. Paul No. 19
- Smoky Lake County
- Sturgeon County
- Thorhild County
- County of Two Hills No. 21
- County of Vermilion River
- Municipal District of Wainwright No. 61
- County of Wetaskiwin No. 10

Specialized municipalities

- Strathcona County

Improvement districts

- Improvement District No. 9 (Banff)
- Improvement District No. 13 (Elk Island)

Indian reserves

- Alexander 134
- Big Horn 144A
- Buck Lake 133C
- Ermineskin 138
- Louis Bull 138B
- Makaoo 120
- O'Chiese 203
- O'Chiese Cemetery 203A
- Pigeon Lake 138A
- Puskiakiwenin 122
- Saddle Lake 125
- Stony Plain 135
- Sunchild 202
- Unipouheos 121
- Wabamun 133A
- Wabamun 133B
- Whitefish Lake 128
