= Buck Lake =

Buck Lake may refer to:

- Buck Lake, Alberta, a hamlet in Canada
- Buck Lake (Alberta), a lake in Alberta, Canada
- Buck Lake 133C, an Indian reserve in Alberta, Canada
- Buck Lake (Ontario), a lake in Ontario, Canada

== See also ==
- Bucks Lake
