= Pigeon Lake (Alberta) =

Lake in Alberta, Canada

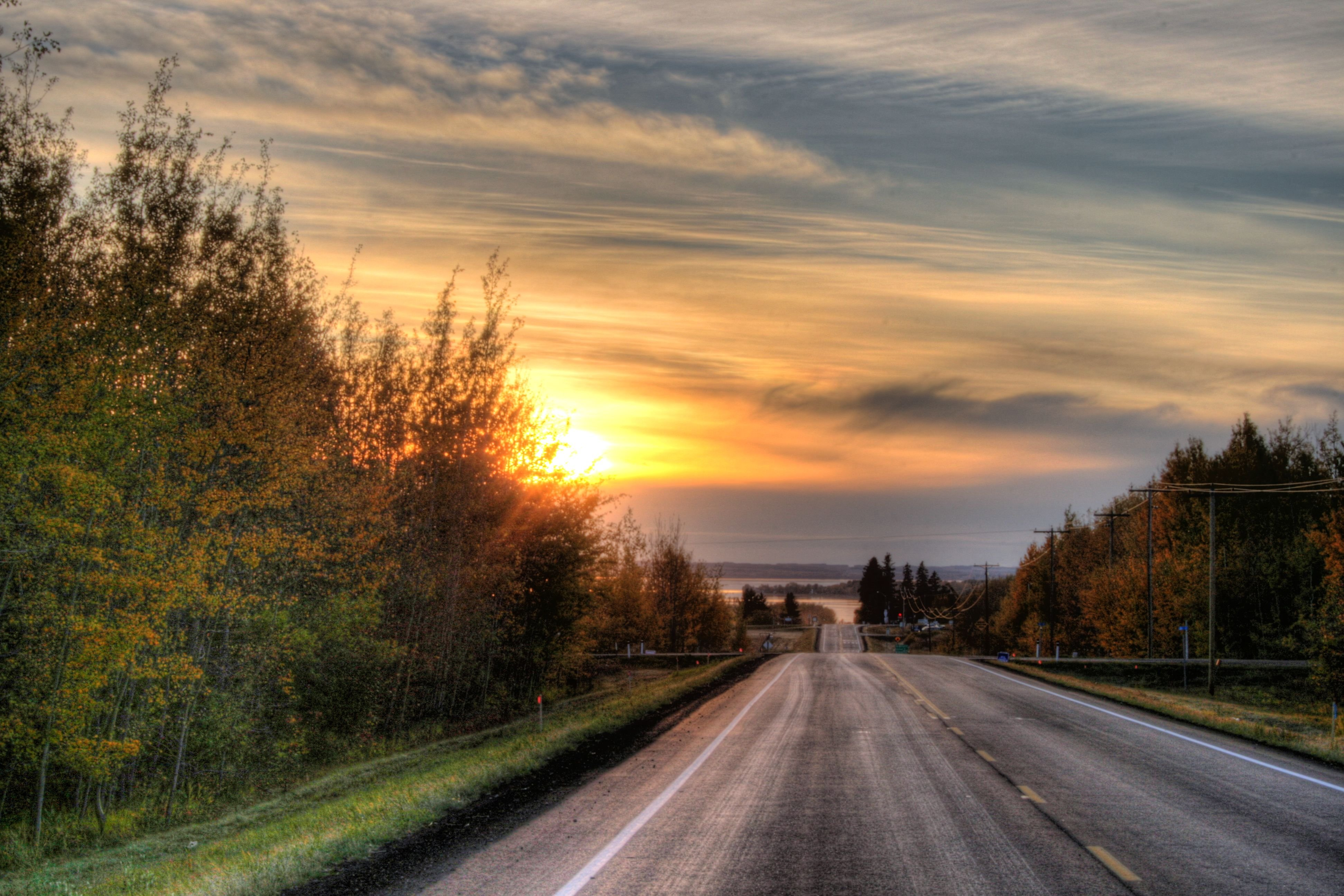
- Looking west over Pigeon Lake at sunset

- Location within Alberta
- Location: Leduc County and County of Wetaskiwin No. 10, Alberta
- Coordinates: 53°01′49″N 114°03′48″W
- Primary outflows: Pigeon Lake Creek
- Catchment area: 187 km^{2} (72 sq mi)
- Basin countries: Canada
- Max. length: 13.1 km (8.1 mi)
- Max. width: 14.7 km (9.1 mi)
- Surface area: 96.7 km^{2} (37.3 sq mi)
- Average depth: 6.2 m (20 ft)
- Max. depth: 9.1 m (30 ft)
- Surface elevation: 852 m (2,795 ft)
- Settlements: Argentia Beach, Crystal Springs, Fisher Home, Golden Days, Grandview, Itaska Beach, Ma-Me-O Beach, Mission Beach, Mulhurst Bay, Norris Beach, Pigeon Lake 138A, Poplar Bay, Silver Beach, Sundance Beach, Village at Pigeon Lake
- References: Pigeon Lake

Pigeon Lake is a lake in central Alberta, Canada that straddles the boundary between Leduc County and the County of Wetaskiwin No. 10. It is located close to Edmonton, Leduc and Wetaskiwin. Communities along the lakeshore include Pigeon Lake Indian Reserve 138A, ten summer villages (Argentia Beach, Crystal Springs, Golden Days, Grandview, Itaska Beach, Ma-Me-O Beach, Norris Beach, Poplar Bay, Silver Beach and Sundance Beach), and four unincorporated communities (Fisher Home, Mission Beach, Mulhurst Bay and Village at Pigeon Lake).

The lake has a total area of 96.7 km^{2} (37.3 sq mi) and a maximum depth of 9.1 m (30 ft). It has a catchment area of 187 km^{2} (72 sq mi), and is an early tributary of the Battle River, to which it is connected through the Pigeon Lake Creek.

Pigeon Lake was previously called "Woodpecker Lake". The name was changed to Pigeon Lake in 1858. In 1896, Pigeon Lake Indian Reserve was established on the southeast shore. Later, the summer village of Ma-Me-O Beach was developed at the south end of the lake on land obtained from the Indian reserve in 1924. Ma-Me-O (omîmîw) is a Cree word meaning "pigeon".

== Conservation ==
The Pigeon Lake Provincial Park is established on the western shore of the lake and is accessed from Highway 771. The Pigeon Lake Watershed Association promotes protection of the lake and beneficial management practices in its watershed.

== Development ==
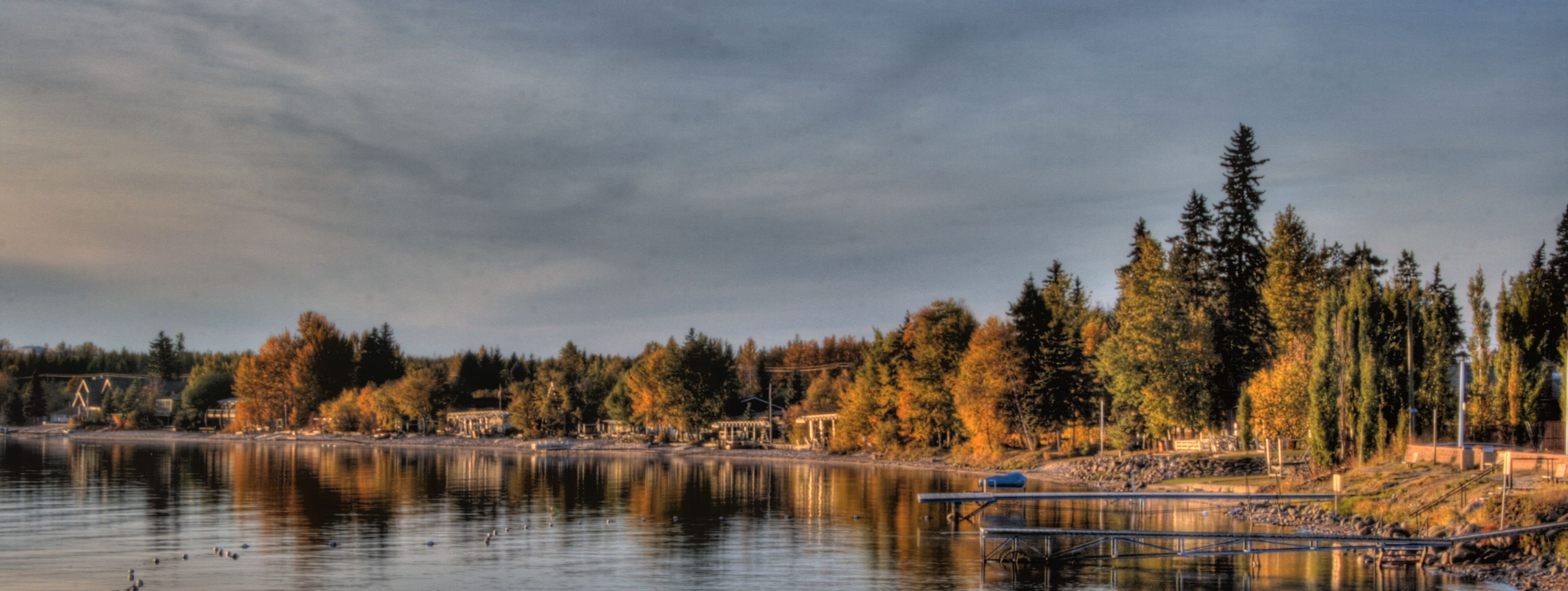
Mulhurst Bay, on the east side of Pigeon Lake

Pigeon Lake is one of the most intensely used recreational areas in Alberta, with 10 summer villages, 4 unincorporated communities, and over 2,300 private cottages along its shores. The summer villages include Argentia Beach, Crystal Springs, Golden Days, Grandview, Itaska Beach, Ma-Me-O Beach, Norris Beach, Poplar Bay, Silver Beach and Sundance Beach. The unincorporated communities include Fisher Home, Mission Beach, Mulhurst Bay and Village at Pigeon Lake. A fifth unincorporated community, Westerose, is located 0.5 km (0.31 mi) to the south of the lake on Highway 13.

== Transportation ==
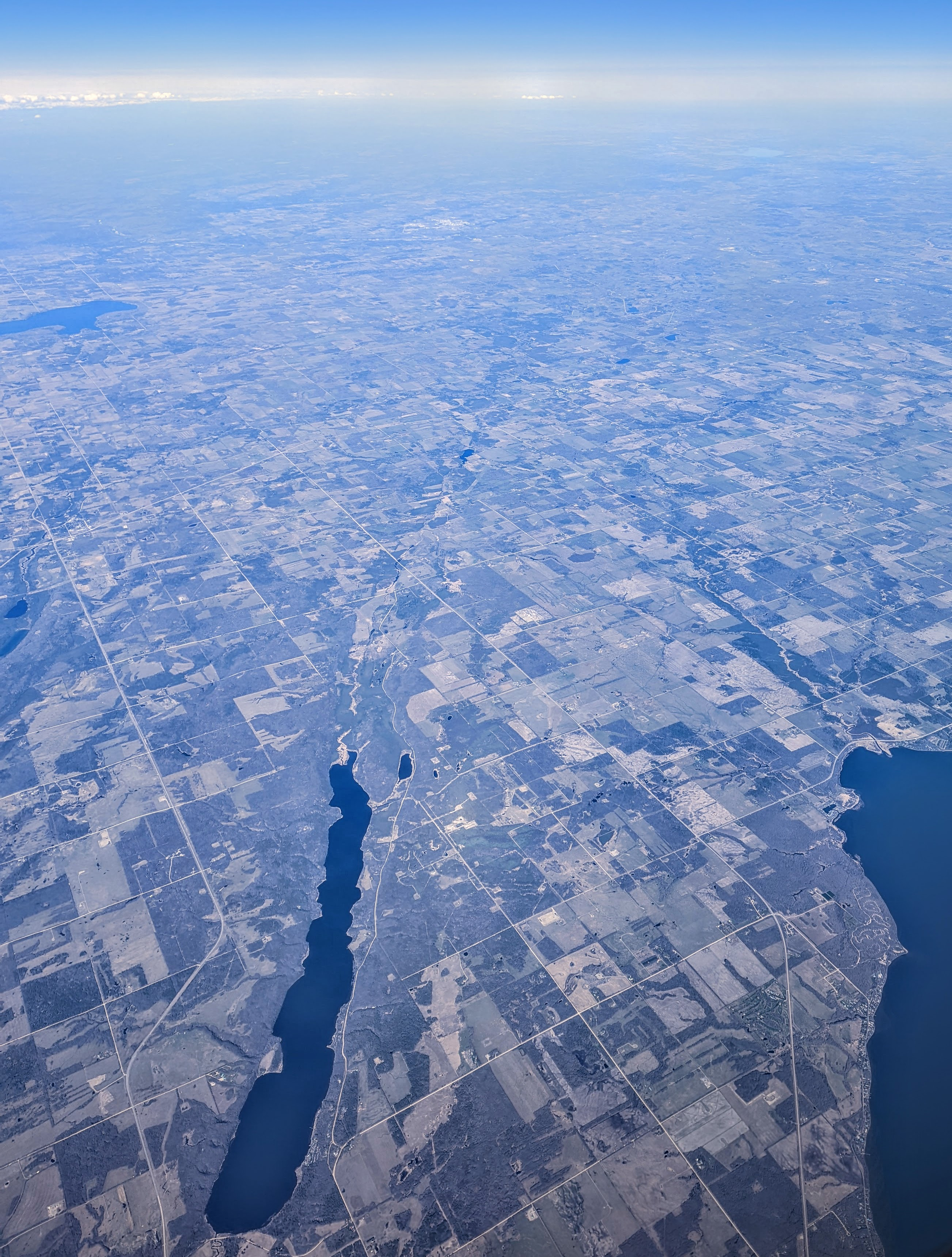
Battle Lake (left) and part of Pigeon Lake (right)

The lake and its communities are accessed along Highway 13 on the south side, Highway 771 on the west side, Highway 616 on the north side, and Highway 780 on the east side.

== Management ==
Concerns over frequency and intensity of cyanobacterial blooms has prompted study of the lake and its watershed. Water sampling was undertaken to characterize water quality, sediment quality, and non-fish biota. This data was then used to create a nutrient budget for lake and to undertake a model to explore future management options.

The watershed community is working to address the sources of external nutrients entering the lake, collaboratively led by the Pigeon Lake Watershed Association and the Alliance of Pigeon Lake Municipalities. Outputs to date include a model land use bylaw for development and redevelopment of land within 0.8 km (0.50 mi) of the shoreline, healthy lake lawn maintenance and work on runoff, which is the source of nearly half of the lake's external nutrients.

== See also ==
- Rundle's Mission
