= Cooking Lake =

Cooking Lake may refer to:

- Cooking Lake (Alberta), a lake in Canada
- Cooking Lake, Alberta, a hamlet in Canada

== See also ==
- North Cooking Lake
