= Millet, Alberta =

Town in Canada

Millet
- Town
- Town of Millet

- Location within Alberta Location within Canada
- Coordinates: 53°05′52″N 113°28′22″W
- Country: Canada
- Province: Alberta
- Region: Central Alberta
- Census division: 11
- Municipal district: County of Wetaskiwin No. 10
- Incorporated
  - Village: June 17, 1903
  - Town: September 1, 1983

Government
  - Mayor: BRADLEY REID (Deputy)
  - Governing body: Millet Town Council

Area (2021)
  - Land: 6.62 km^{2} (2.56 sq mi)
- Elevation: 755 m (2,477 ft)

Population (2021)
  - Total: 1,890
  - Density: 285.3/km^{2} (739/sq mi)
- Time zone: UTC−06:00 (Alberta Time)
- Postal code span: T0C 1Z0
- Area code: -1+780
- Highways: Highway 2A; Highway 616
- Waterways: Pigeon Lake; Coal Lake; Pipestone Creek
- Website: Official website

Millet is a town in central Alberta, Canada. It is approximately 40 kilometres (25 mi) south of Alberta's capital city of Edmonton.

== History ==
The Town of Millet was named in honour of August Millet, who was believed to be a canoeist for Father Lacombe. (Another possible source of the name is that it is named after French painter Jean-François Millet, a favourite of railway tycoon William Cornelius Van Horne, who also named nearby Hobbema after Dutch painter Meindert Hobbema.)

On June 17, 1903, Millet was proclaimed a village by an Order-in-Council of the Northwest Territories. By 1908, Millet's first councillors were elected.

In October 1927, a disastrous fire destroyed many of the buildings along the east side of Railway Street.

In 1950, the Board of Trade built a community hall and gave it to the Village. The hall is still being used today. In 1953, Northwestern Utilities brought natural gas to the Village. Griffiths Scott School was built in 1982, and a Senior Citizens Apartment was completed in 1983. On September 1, 1983, Millet was declared a town, and "Coming to Town" celebrations were held on October 15, 1983.

Australian woman Allyson McConnell murdered her two children, Connor and Jayden, in Millet in 2010. The case received press coverage in both Canada and Australia. The Canadian Press wrote that the case "shocked and rallied the community" in Millet.

== Demographics ==
In the 2021 Census of Population conducted by Statistics Canada, the Town of Millet had a population of 1,890 living in 800 of its 839 total private dwellings, a change of −3.3% from its 2016 population of 1,955. With a land area of 6.62 km^{2} (2.56 sq mi), it had a population density of 285.5/km^{2} (739.4/sq mi) in 2021.

In the 2016 Census of Population conducted by Statistics Canada, the Town of Millet recorded a population of 1,945 living in 822 of its 866 total private dwellings, a −7% change from its 2011 population of 2,092. With a land area of 3.72 km^{2} (1.44 sq mi), it had a population density of 522.8/km^{2} (1,354.2/sq mi) in 2016.

== Economy ==
Millet focuses on agriculture and recreation.

== Arts and culture ==
In May, Millet hosts the Millet Massacre, which includes live bands and a beer garden. In June of every year, a Millet Days celebration takes place, which includes a parade, trade show, softball tournament, fireworks, and a soccer tournament.

== Attractions ==
The Millet and District Museum, Archives and Visitor Information Centre was established in 1985. It is located at the north end of town on the west side of Highway 2A.

== Education ==
Wetaskiwin Regional Division No. 11 operates public schools. Millet has one school - Griffiths-Scott School, which serves grades EC-8. Wetaskiwin Composite High School serves Millet for high school.

Pipestone School does not serve Millet, and is in nearby Pipestone.

== Media ==
The town is the home of the official County of Wetaskiwin weekly newspaper, and the Leduc County weekly newspaper, The Leduc-Wetaskiwin Pipestone Flyer. Due to its proximity to two cities, the town's news is also covered in the Wetaskiwin Times and the Leduc Representative.

In the Wetaskiwin area, a community channel (Northern Cablevision Channel 10) is broadcast out of the city of Wetaskiwin, as well as two radio stations. Other major radio stations are picked up from Edmonton. The Edmonton Sun and Edmonton Journal are also distributed in Millet.

== See also ==
- List of communities in Alberta
- List of towns in Alberta
