= Baptiste Lake (Alberta) =

Lake in Alberta, Canada

- Location within Alberta
- Location: Athabasca County, Alberta
- Coordinates: 54°45′24″N 113°33′38″W
- Basin countries: Canada
- Max. length: 7.48 km (4.65 mi)
- Max. width: 3.12 km (1.94 mi)
- Surface area: 9.81 km^{2} (3.79 sq mi)
- Average depth: 8.6 m (28 ft)
- Max. depth: 27.5 m (90 ft)
- Surface elevation: 579 m (1,900 ft)
- Settlements: Athabasca, Alberta

Baptiste Lake is a lake in Alberta, Canada.

The lake has the name of Baptiste Majeau, a pioneer citizen.

== Summer villages ==
The following summer villages are located along Baptiste Lake:

- South Baptiste
- Sunset Beach
- West Baptiste
- Whispering Hills

== See also ==
- List of lakes in Alberta
