= Village at Pigeon Lake =

- Hamlet
- Location of Village at Pigeon Lake Village at Pigeon Lake (Canada)
- Coordinates: 52°57′46″N 114°01′40″W
- Country: Canada
- Province: Alberta
- Region: Central Alberta
- Census division: 11
- Municipal district: County of Wetaskiwin No. 10

Government
  - Type: Unincorporated
  - Governing body: County of Wetaskiwin No. 10 Council

Population (2006)
  - Total: 77
- Time zone: UTC−06:00 (Alberta Time)
- Area codes: 780, 587, 825

The Village at Pigeon Lake is a hamlet in central Alberta, Canada within the County of Wetaskiwin No. 10. It is located 0.3 kilometres (0.19 mi) north of Highway 13, approximately 44 kilometres (27 mi) west of Wetaskiwin.

== Toponymy ==
The Village at Pigeon Lake is named for its proximity to Pigeon Lake. The lake itself was so named around 1858 by James Hector of the Palliser Expedition, likely due to the abundance of passenger pigeons (now extinct) in the area. The lake is also known as Woodpecker Lake in the Cree language.

== Environment ==
White-tailed and mule deer live in the vicinity of the Village at Pigeon Lake, as do coyotes, stripes skunks, and ground squirrels.

== History ==
=== Pre-settlement ===
Before the settlement of Canada, the site of the Village at Pigeon Lake was frequented by members of the Cree and Stoney First Nations, who accessed the area to fish and hunt.

=== Village at Pigeon Lake ===
Before the hamlet's formal establishment, the site contained scattered residential properties, used by tourists and full-time residents seeking access to Pigeon Lake for recreational purposes.

In 1995, developer Terry Myers proposed introducing a planned community near the water, to be named the Village at Pigeon Lake. The community was designed to be a self-contained beachside resort, incorporating amenities, businesses, services, and residential properties. Myers based its architecture on historic prairie towns, and incorporated protections for the area's existing spruce trees and other flora in the hamlet's design. The resort was largely completed by 1998.

In 2007, the Village at Pigeon Lake became the home of the Pigeon Lake Watershed Association, an environmental non-profit organization dedicating to conserving Pigeon Lake and its surrounding watershed.

== Demographics ==
The Village at Pigeon Lake recorded a permanent population of 77 in the 2006 Census of Population conducted by Statistics Canada.

== Services and amenities ==
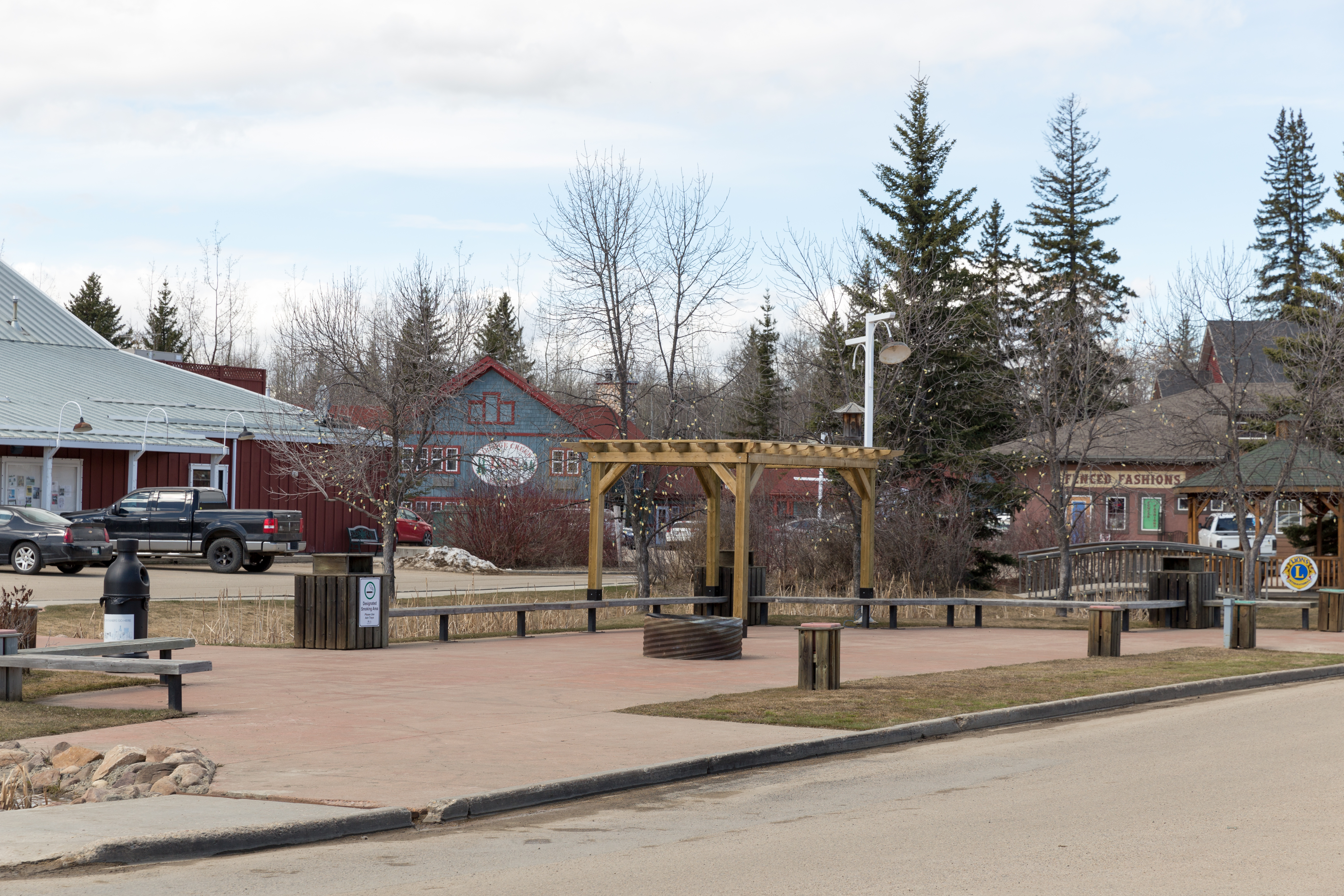
The Village at Pigeon Lake's town square, pictured 2017.

=== Services ===
As of 2026, the Village at Pigeon Lake is home to around 16 commercial stores and restaurants, as well as a hotel and spa. Several small farms that sell fresh produce operate in the area.

Health services are accessible in Wetaskiwin and Winfield, while emergency fire services are provided through the South Pigeon Lake Fire Department.

=== Amenities ===
The Village at Pigeon Lake's tourist operations are open all year, and it also hosts seasonal events to celebrate public holidays. The hamlet is close to three golf courses, several RV parks and Pigeon Lake Provincial Park.

== See also ==
- List of communities in Alberta
- List of hamlets in Alberta
