= Crystal Springs, Alberta =

Crystal Springs
- Summer village
- Summer Village of Crystal Springs
- Location of Crystal Springs in Alberta
- Coordinates: 52.98110°N 114.04628°W
- Country: Canada
- Province: Alberta
- Census division: No. 11
- Incorporated: January 1, 1957

Government
  - Type: Municipal incorporation
  - Mayor: Ian Rawlinson
  - Governing body: Crystal Springs Summer Village Council

Area (2021)
  - Land: 0.45 km^{2} (0.17 sq mi)

Population (2021)
  - Total: 74
  - Density: 163.4/km^{2} (423/sq mi)
- Time zone: UTC−06:00 (Alberta Time)
- Website: crystalsprings.ca

Crystal Springs is a summer village in Alberta, Canada. It is located on the southeast shores of Pigeon Lake, 1.2 km (0.75 mi) north of Highway 13. The community borders the Summer Village of Grandview to the northwest and the Village at Pigeon Lake to the south.

== History ==
Crystal Springs withdrew from the Municipal District of Wetaskiwin No. 74 and was incorporated as a summer village on January 1, 1957.

== Demographics ==
In the 2021 Census of Population conducted by Statistics Canada, the Summer Village of Crystal Springs had a population of 74 living in 40 of its 130 total private dwellings, a change of 45.1% from its 2016 population of 51. With a land area of 0.45 km^{2} (0.17 sq mi), it had a population density of 164.4/km^{2} (425.9/sq mi) in 2021.

In the 2016 Census of Population conducted by Statistics Canada, the Summer Village of Crystal Springs had a population of 51 living in 26 of its 108 total private dwellings, a −43.3% change from its 2011 population of 90. With a land area of 0.57 km^{2} (0.22 sq mi), it had a population density of 89.5/km^{2} (231.7/sq mi) in 2016.

== See also ==
- List of communities in Alberta
- List of summer villages in Alberta
- List of resort villages in Saskatchewan
