= Pigeon Lake Provincial Park =

Provincial park in Alberta, Canada

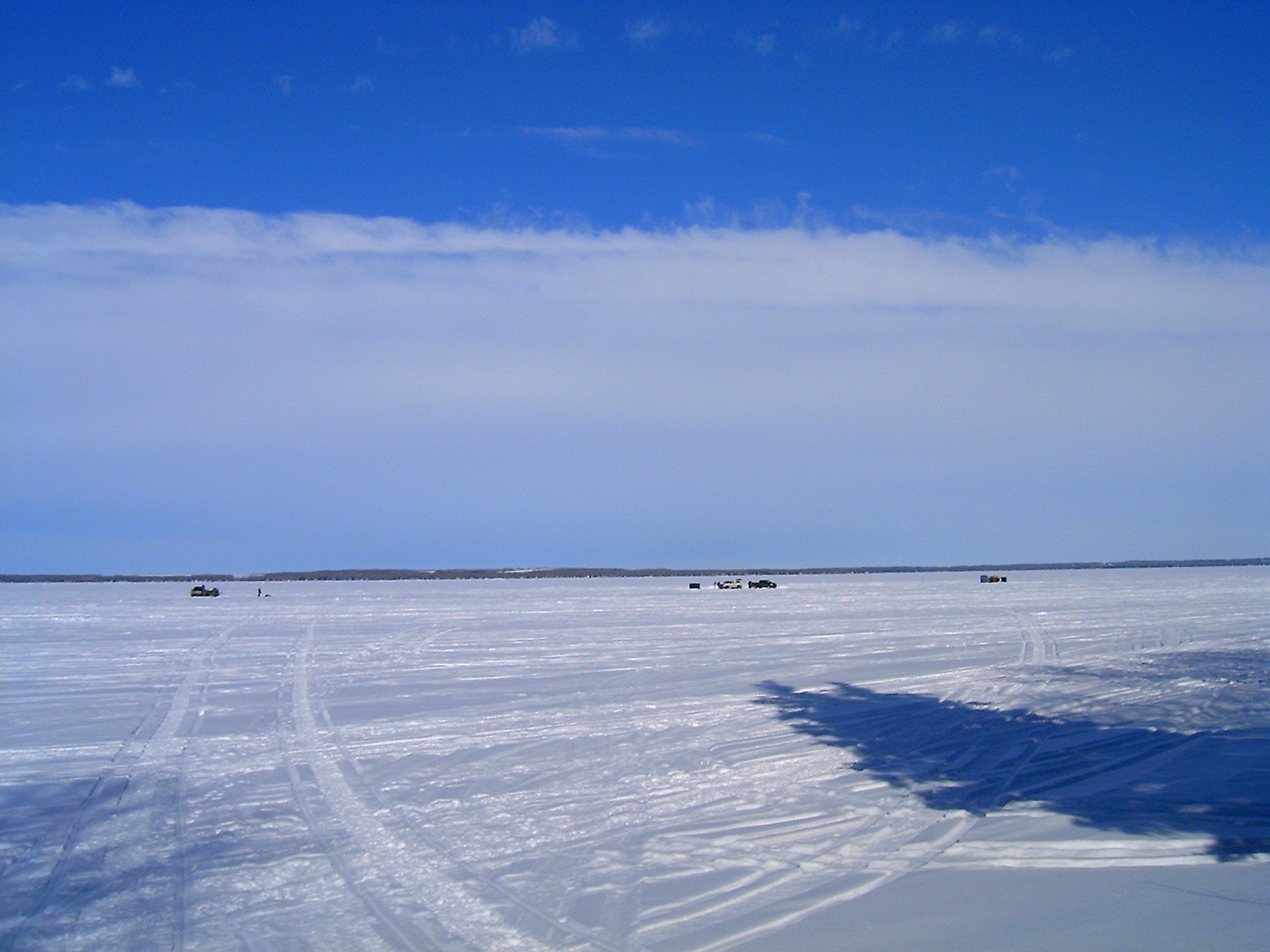
- Ice fishing on frozen Pigeon Lake

- Location within Alberta Location within Canada
- Interactive map of Pigeon Lake Provincial Park
- Location: County of Wetaskiwin No. 10, Alberta, Canada
- Nearest city: Wetaskiwin
- Coordinates: 53°02′07″N 114°09′40″W
- Area: 4.43 km^{2} (1.71 sq mi)
- Established: May 26, 1967
- Governing body: Alberta Parks
- Website: albertaparks.ca

Pigeon Lake Provincial Park is a provincial park located in central Alberta, Canada, within the County of Wetaskiwin No. 10.

The park is located on the southwestern shore of Pigeon Lake. The Provincial Park was established in 1967 and opened in 1973.
