= Wetaskiwin and District Heritage Museum =

Wetaskiwin & District Heritage Museum
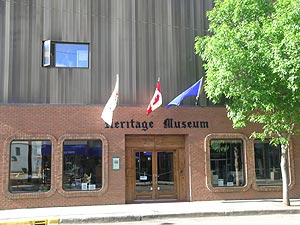
- Established: 1986
- Location: Wetaskiwin, Alberta Canada
- Coordinates: 52.96946°N 113.37519°W
- Director: Karen Aberle
- Website: www.wetaskiwinmuseum.com

The Wetaskiwin and District Heritage Museum, in Wetaskiwin, Alberta, Canada covers the history, heritage, and culture of Wetaskiwin, the Cree Four Band Reserve, and surrounding rural area. The Museum is located on main street at 5007 - 50 Avenue.

== History ==
The Wetaskiwin and District Heritage Museum was incorporated as a non-profit society in May 1986.

In 2004, the museum outgrew the Calgary Power building, and the Wetaskiwin and District Museum Society purchased the Montgomery Store building situated on Main Street. The main floor opened in November 2004. The entire building-home to a collection of more than 15,000 artefacts-officially opened its doors on May 7, 2005.

== Exhibits ==
=== Children's Legacy Centre ===
The Children's Legacy Centre, located in the basement of the historic building, is a unique, hands-on permanent exhibit showcasing pioneer life. Kids are invited to experience a one-room schoolhouse, visit a pioneer kitchen, and explore other rooms while dressed in period clothing.

=== The Women of Aspenland ===
Every October, Canada celebrates Women's History Month. October was chosen because it is the month in which Canadian women officially became persons by law. The Wetaskiwin & District Heritage Museum honours and celebrates the Women of Aspenland as an ongoing exhibit. It pays tribute to the many women who made their own unique contributions to the community of Wetaskiwin and area. 2008's inductees were Mary (Keogh) Christopher, Margaret (Todd) Emmett, Minnie Johnson, and Caroline (Dorchester) Shantz.

=== Temporary exhibits ===
The main floor features temporary exhibits which are changed on an annual basis. Presently featured is "Entertainment and Past Times" (1890-1940). The main floor also holds the Gift Shop, Front Desk, Donation Desk, Resource Library, and Public Washrooms.

=== Second floor exhibits ===
==== Origins Exhibit ====
The Origins Exhibit includes dinosaur fossils, archaeological artefacts, and facts about the local Cree Nations of Samson, Ermineskin, Montana, and Louis Bull. A fur trading post and a tipi are also included in the exhibit. There are also Interactive Games, where you can learn about Cree migration, bison, and fur trading.

==== Community Halls ====
After two years of research and more than 250 hours of exhibit design work, visitors are now welcome to explore the new "virtual" exhibit devoted to twenty-five Community Halls from the County of Wetaskiwin No. 10. Read the halls' histories and view hundreds of pictures on a touch screen computer.

==== Christian Heritage ====
The Christian Heritage exhibit contains information regarding 28 churches from the Wetaskiwin district, and displays artefacts from many different congregations.

==== History of Healing ====
A hundred years of history about the local hospitals and the healthcare professionals who served the community.

==== Early businesses ====
Wetaskiwin's earliest businesses include French's Jewellery, the local branches of seven different banks, the Driard Hotel and Barbershop, the Drug Store, a General Store, the City Meat Market, and local dairies.

==== Century Home ====
This turn-of-the-century town house features a circa 1910 living room, kitchen, master bedroom and child's room.

==== Immigrant stories ====
Immigration has had an enormous effect on Canada, and the Heritage Museum features exhibits devoted to the Swedish and Chinese immigrants who helped build the City of Wetaskiwin.

==== War Years Remembered ====
This exhibit honours the citizens who served on the home front and overseas. A war brides exhibit is also featured.
