= Wetaskiwin Regional Division No. 11 =

School board in Wetaskiwin, Alberta, Canada

Wetaskiwin Regional Public Schools Wetaskiwin Regional Division No. 11

Location
- 5515 - 47A Avenue; Wetaskiwin, Alberta, Canada Canada
- Coordinates: 52°58′5″N 113°23′17″W

District information
- Superintendent: Mike Wake
- Chair of the board: Karen Becker
- Schools: 20
- Budget: https://www.wrps.ab.ca/division-office/finance

Students and staff
- Students: 3,939 (September 2007)

Other information
- Elected trustees: Leanne Axelsen, City of Wetaskiwin; Barb Johnson, City of Wetaskiwin; Laura White, City of Wetaskiwin; Joline Mearon-Bull, Maskwacis Cree Nation; Lynn Ware, rural electoral division 1 Kathryn Weremey, rural electoral division 2 Kyle Dorchester, rural electoral division 3 Karen Becker, rural electoral division 4
- Website: www.wrps11.ca

Wetaskiwin Regional Division No. 11 or Wetaskiwin Regional Public Schools (WRPS) is the school board serving the County of Wetaskiwin No. 10. WRPS is a public school board system obliged to accept anyone who meets age and location requirements.

== Size ==
WRPS operates 20 public schools in Wetaskiwin, Millet, Gwynne, Pigeon Lake Buck Lake, Alder Flats and Winfield. Also included in the school division is the Wetaskiwin Home Education system and two Colony Schools Pine Haven Colony School and Silver Creek Colony School.

== Governance ==
WRPS is operated by a group of seven elected trustees and one appointed trustee they then elect a chairman, and a vice-chairman. Each of the trustees overlooks a different electoral district, whether it be the city of Wetaskiwin, Millet, or other rural attendance areas.

== Schools ==
- Alder Flats Elementary School (Alder Flats)
- Buck Mountain Central School (Buck Lake)
- C. B. McMurdo Center (Wetaskiwin)
- Centennial Elementary School (Wetaskiwin)
- Clear Vista School (Wetaskiwin)
- Parkdale School (Wetaskiwin)
- École Queen Elizabeth School (Wetaskiwin)
- Falun Elementary School (Falun)
- Griffiths-Scott School (Millet)
- Gwynne School (Gwynne)
- Lakedell Elementary School (Westerose)
- Norwood School (Wetaskiwin)
- Pigeon Lake Regional School (Falun)
- Pine Haven Colony School (Wetaskiwin)
- Pipestone School (Millet)
- Silver Creek Colony School (Ferintosh)
- The Early Education and Family Wellness Centre (Wetaskiwin)
- Wetaskiwin Composite High School Wetaskiwin Composite High School
- Winfield School (Winfield)

== See also ==
- List of Alberta school boards
