= Wetaskiwin Composite High School =

Public senior high school in Wetaskiwin, Alberta, Canada

Coordinates: 52.9680°N 113.3655°W

Wetaskiwin Composite High School (WCHS) is a public senior high school in Wetaskiwin, Alberta and a part of Wetaskiwin Regional Division No. 11.

Adjacent to the City of Wetaskiwin Recreation Complex, the building has an area of about 6,500 square metres (70,000 sq ft). In addition to Wetaskiwin it serves Millet, sections of the County of Wetaskiwin No. 10, and the Four Nations Reserve.
