= Pipestone, Alberta =

Coordinates: 53°03′13″N 113°47′41″W

Location of Pipestone Alberta

Pipestone is an unincorporated community in central Alberta in the County of Wetaskiwin No. 10. It is approximately 12 kilometres (7.5 mi) west of Highway 2 and 29 kilometres (18 mi) northwest of Wetaskiwin.

== Education ==
Wetaskiwin Regional Division No. 11 operates public schools. Pipestone School serves grades Kindergarten-6, while Pigeon Lake Regional School serves Pipestone for grades 7–12.
