= Pigeon Lake Regional School =

School in Falun, Alberta, Canada

Pigeon Lake Regional School is a public grade 7–12 middle and high school in Falun, Alberta, and a part of Wetaskiwin Regional Division No. 11. It serves Falun, Pipestone, Westerose, the Pigeon Lake area, the reserve of Ma-Me-O Beach First Nations, the Maskwacis (formerly Hobbema) reserve, the Louis Bull Reserve, and the Pigeon Lake Reserve. As of 2018 it had about 300 students.
