= Falun, Alberta =

Falun
- Hamlet
- Location of Falun Falun (Canada)
- Coordinates: 52°57′30″N 113°50′33″W
- Country: Canada
- Province: Alberta
- Region: Central Alberta
- Census division: 11
- Municipal district: County of Wetaskiwin No. 10

Government
  - Type: Unincorporated
  - Governing body: County of Wetaskiwin No. 10 Council

Population (1991)
  - Total: 25
- Time zone: UTC−06:00 (Alberta Time)
- Area codes: 780, 587, 825

Falun is a hamlet in central Alberta, Canada within the County of Wetaskiwin No. 10. It is located on Highway 13, approximately 31 kilometres (19 mi) west of Wetaskiwin.

The community was named by John Strom after Falun, in Sweden, the native land of a large share of the early citizens. The first school opened in 1906 and the first post office opened in 1904.

Falun is home to an outdoor arena that features the boards and glass from Calgary's Scotiabank Saddledome.

== Demographics ==
Falun recorded a population of 25 in the 1991 Census of Population conducted by Statistics Canada.

== Education ==
Wetaskiwin Regional Division No. 11 operates public schools: Falun Elementary School serves primary grades, and Pigeon Lake Regional School serves secondary grades.

== See also ==
- List of communities in Alberta
- List of hamlets in Alberta
