= Whispering Hills, Alberta =

Whispering Hills
- Summer village
- Summer Village of Whispering Hills
- Location of Whispering Hills in Alberta
- Coordinates: 54.76320°N 113.54907°W
- Country: Canada
- Province: Alberta
- Census division: No. 13

Government
  - Type: Municipal incorporation
  - Mayor: Curtis Schoepp
  - Governing body: Whispering Hills Summer Village Council

Area (2021)
  - Land: 1.64 km^{2} (0.63 sq mi)

Population (2021)
  - Total: 128
  - Density: 78.2/km^{2} (203/sq mi)
- Time zone: UTC−06:00 (Alberta Time)
- Website: Official website

Whispering Hills is a summer village in Alberta, Canada. It is located on the eastern shore of Baptiste Lake.

== Demographics ==
In the 2021 Census of Population conducted by Statistics Canada, the Summer Village of Whispering Hills had a population of 128 living in 60 of its 134 total private dwellings, a change of −9.9% from its 2016 population of 142. With a land area of 1.64 km^{2} (0.63 sq mi), it had a population density of 78.0/km^{2} (202.1/sq mi) in 2021.

In the 2016 Census of Population conducted by Statistics Canada, the Summer Village of Whispering Hills had a population of 142 living in 62 of its 136 total private dwellings, a 31.5% change from its 2011 population of 108. With a land area of 1.68 km^{2} (0.65 sq mi), it had a population density of 84.5/km^{2} (218.9/sq mi) in 2016.

== See also ==
- List of communities in Alberta
- List of francophone communities in Alberta
- List of summer villages in Alberta
- List of resort villages in Saskatchewan
