= Westerose =

- Hamlet
- Location of Westerose Westerose (Canada)
- Coordinates: 52°57′29″N 114°00′00″W
- Country: Canada
- Province: Alberta
- Region: Central Alberta
- Census division: 11
- Municipal district: County of Wetaskiwin No. 10

Government
  - Type: Unincorporated
  - Governing body: County of Wetaskiwin No. 10 Council

Population (1991)
  - Total: 63
- Time zone: UTC−06:00 (Alberta Time)
- Area codes: 780, 587, 825

Westerose is a hamlet in central Alberta, Canada within the County of Wetaskiwin No. 10. It is located on Highway 13, approximately 44 kilometres (27 mi) west of Wetaskiwin.

== Demographics ==
Westerose recorded a population of 63 in the 1991 Census of Population conducted by Statistics Canada.

== Education ==
Residents of Westerose are assigned to schools in the Wetaskiwin Regional Division No. 11, with Lakedell School serving primary grades and Pigeon Lake Regional School serving secondary grades.

== Notable people ==
- Shirley Anne Cripps, Canadian politician, Progressive Conservative MLA (1979-1989)

== See also ==
- List of communities in Alberta
- List of hamlets in Alberta
