= Division No. 11, Alberta =

Census division in Canada

Coordinates: 53.543997°N 113.489856°W

Division No. 11
- Census division in Alberta
- Country: Canada
- Province: Alberta

Area
  - Total: 15,768 km^{2} (6,088 sq mi)
- As of 2011

Population (2021)
  - Total: 1,462,041
  - Density: 92.722/km^{2} (240.15/sq mi)

Division No. 11 is a census division in Alberta, Canada. Surrounding the City of Edmonton, the majority of the division comprises Alberta's Capital Region, while the western and southern portions of the division are located within central Alberta. The division also forms the northern segment of the Calgary–Edmonton Corridor.

== Census subdivisions ==
Historical population
Year	Pop.	±%
1991	876,292	—
1996	898,888	+2.6%
2001	975,477	+8.5%
2006	1,076,103	+10.3%
2011	1,203,115	+11.8%
2016	1,366,050	+13.5%
2021	1,462,041	+7.0%

The following census subdivisions (municipalities or municipal equivalents) are located within Alberta's Division No. 11.

- Cities
  - Edmonton
  - Beaumont
  - Fort Saskatchewan
  - Leduc
  - Spruce Grove
  - St. Albert
  - Wetaskiwin
- Towns
  - Bon Accord
  - Calmar
  - Devon
  - Drayton Valley
  - Gibbons
  - Legal
  - Millet
  - Morinville
  - Redwater
  - Stony Plain
  - Thorsby
- Villages
  - Breton
  - Spring Lake
  - Wabamun
  - Warburg
- Summer villages
  - Argentia Beach
  - Betula Beach
  - Crystal Springs
  - Golden Days
  - Grandview
  - Itaska Beach
  - Kapasiwin
  - Lakeview
  - Ma-Me-O Beach
  - Norris Beach
  - Point Alison
  - Poplar Bay
  - Seba Beach
  - Silver Beach
  - Sundance Beach
- Hamlets
  - Alcomdale
  - Buck Creek
  - Calahoo
  - Carbondale
  - Cynthia
  - Duffield
  - Falun
  - Lodgepole
  - North Cooking Lake
  - Rocky Rapids
  - Rolly View
  - South Cooking Lake
  - Sunnybrook
  - Telfordville
  - Westerose
  - Village at Pigeon Lake
- Specialized municipalities
  - Strathcona County
    - Urban service areas
      - Sherwood Park
- Municipal districts
  - Brazeau County
  - Leduc County
  - Parkland County
  - Sturgeon County
  - Wetaskiwin No. 10, County of
- Indian reserves
  - Alexander 134
  - Enoch Cree Nation 135
  - Ermineskin 138
  - Louis Bull 138B
  - Pigeon Lake 138A
  - Wabamun 133A
  - Wabamun 133B

== Demographics ==
In the 2021 Census of Population conducted by Statistics Canada, Division No. 11 had a population of 1,462,041 living in 565,756 of its 609,810 total private dwellings, a change of 7% from its 2016 population of 1,366,050. With a land area of 15,746.42 km^{2} (6,079.73 sq mi), it had a population density of 92.8/km^{2} (240.5/sq mi) in 2021.

== See also ==
- List of census divisions of Alberta
- List of communities in Alberta
