= White Gull, Alberta =

White Gull
- Former summer village
- Location of White Gull White Gull (Alberta)
- Coordinates: 54°47′01″N 113°33′12″W
- Country: Canada
- Province: Alberta
- Region: Northern Alberta
- Census division: 13
- Municipal district: Athabasca County
- Incorporated (summer village): January 1, 1983
- Dissolved: January 1, 2003

Area
  - Land: 4.03 km^{2} (1.56 sq mi)

Population (2006)
  - Total: 124
- Time zone: UTC−06:00 (Alberta Time)

White Gull is an unincorporated community in northern Alberta, Canada within Athabasca County. It is 1 kilometre (0.62 mi) west of Highway 2, approximately 138 km (86 mi) north of Edmonton.

== History ==
White Gull incorporated as a summer village on January 1, 1983. It dissolved from village status on January 1, 2003.

== Demographics ==
Population history of White Gull
Year	Pop.	±%
1986	7	—
1991	10	+42.9%
1996	24	+140.0%
2001	36	+50.0%
2006	124	+244.4%
Source: Statistics Canada

In the 2006 Census of Population conducted by Statistics Canada, the dissolved Summer Village White Gull had a population of 124 living in 54 of its 143 total private dwellings, a change of 34.8% from its 2001 population of 92. With a land area of 4.03 km^{2} (1.56 sq mi), it had a population density of 30.8/km^{2} (79.7/sq mi) in 2006.

== See also ==
- List of former urban municipalities in Alberta
