= Buck Lake (Alberta) =

Lake in Alberta, Canada

- Location within Alberta
- Location: County of Wetaskiwin No. 10, Alberta
- Coordinates: 52°59′06″N 114°45′50″W
- Type: Eutrophic
- Primary inflows: Bayview Creek, Willowhaven Creek, Muskrat Creek, Mink Creek
- Primary outflows: Bucklake Creek
- Catchment area: North Saskatchewan River
- Basin countries: Canada
- Max. length: 9.3 km (5.8 mi)
- Max. width: 6.1 km (3.8 mi)
- Surface area: 25.4 km^{2} (9.8 sq mi)
- Average depth: 6.2 m (20 ft)
- Max. depth: 12.2 m (40 ft)
- Water volume: 157×10^{6} m^{3} (127,000 acre⋅ft)
- Residence time: 8.0 years
- Shore length^{1}: 32.8 km (20.4 mi)
- Surface elevation: 881 m (2,890 ft)
- Settlements: Buck Lake
- References: Buck Lake, Buck Lake Monitoring Program 1992
- ^{1} Shore length is not a well-defined measure.

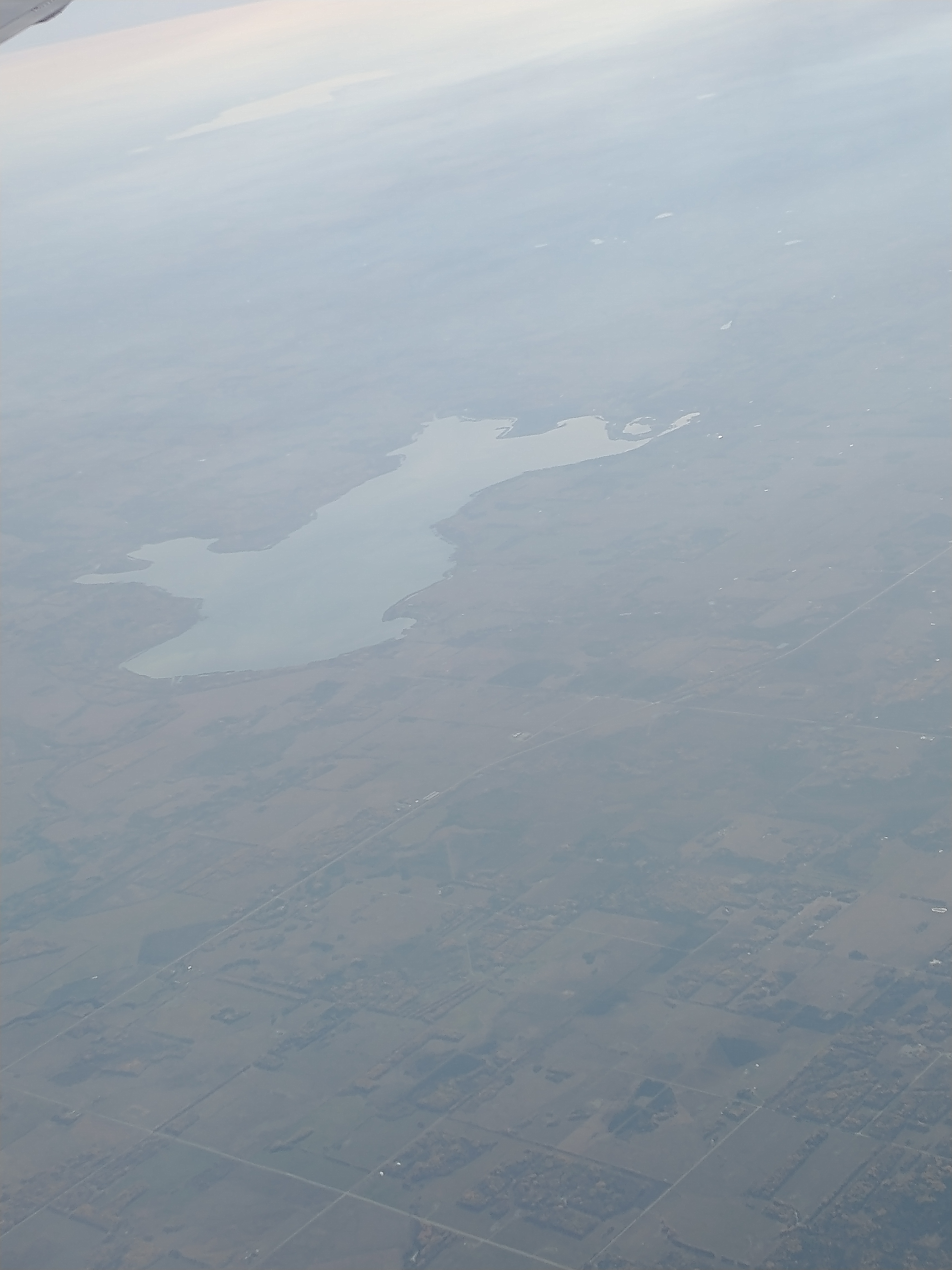

Buck Lake is a lake in the County of Wetaskiwin in Alberta. Through its outlet into Buck Lake Creek on its north shore, the lake is part of the North Saskatchewan River system.

The hamlet of Buck Lake is situated on the southwest shore of the lake. The Calhoun Bay Provincial Recreation Area, with campsites and water supply, is located on the central eastern shore. While the shoreline of Buck Lake is home to several developments, including Greystones and Oakes Bay on the northeast arm, most of the shoreline remains undeveloped. Buck Lake is set amidst gently rolling hills in the County of Wetaskiwin, 105 km southwest of the city of Edmonton and 70 km north of the town of Rocky Mountain House. The northernmost end of the lake borders the Buck Mountain Provincial Grazing Reserve, in which the nearby Buck Mountain is situated.
