= Sunset Beach, Alberta =

Sunset Beach
- Summer village
- Summer Village of Sunset Beach
- Location of Sunset Beach in Alberta
- Coordinates: 54.73269°N 113.5289°W
- Country: Canada
- Province: Alberta
- Census division: No. 13

Government
  - Type: Municipal incorporation
  - Mayor: Morris Nesdole
  - Governing body: Sunset Beach Summer Village Council

Area (2021)
  - Land: 0.87 km^{2} (0.34 sq mi)

Population (2021)
  - Total: 55
  - Density: 63.5/km^{2} (164/sq mi)
- Time zone: UTC−06:00 (Alberta Time)
- Website: summervillageofsunsetbeach.com

Sunset Beach is a summer village in Alberta, Canada. It is located on the eastern shore of Baptiste Lake.

== Demographics ==
In the 2021 Census of Population conducted by Statistics Canada, the Summer Village of Sunset Beach had a population of 55 living in 29 of its 92 total private dwellings, a change of 12.2% from its 2016 population of 49. With a land area of 0.87 km^{2} (0.34 sq mi), it had a population density of 63.2/km^{2} (163.7/sq mi) in 2021.

In the 2016 Census of Population conducted by Statistics Canada, the Summer Village of Sunset Beach had a population of 49 living in 25 of its 99 total private dwellings, a change of 11.4% from its 2011 population of 44. With a land area of 0.74 km^{2} (0.29 sq mi), it had a population density of 66.2/km^{2} (171.5/sq mi) in 2016.

== See also ==
- List of communities in Alberta
- List of summer villages in Alberta
- List of resort villages in Saskatchewan
