= West Baptiste =

- Summer village
- Summer Village of West Baptiste
- Location of West Baptiste in Alberta
- Coordinates: 54.75719°N 113.55482°W
- Country: Canada
- Province: Alberta
- Census division: No. 13

Government
  - Type: Municipal incorporation
  - Mayor: Keith Wilson
  - Governing body: West Baptiste Summer Village Council

Area (2021)
  - Land: 0.54 km^{2} (0.21 sq mi)

Population (2021)
  - Total: 46
  - Density: 85.1/km^{2} (220/sq mi)
- Time zone: UTC−06:00 (Alberta Time)
- Website: Official website

West Baptiste is a summer village in Alberta, Canada. It is located on the western shore of Baptiste Lake, west of Athabasca.

== Demographics ==
In the 2021 Census of Population conducted by Statistics Canada, the Summer Village of West Baptiste had a population of 46 living in 25 of its 64 total private dwellings, a change of 21.1% from its 2016 population of 38. With a land area of 0.54 km^{2} (0.21 sq mi), it had a population density of 85.2/km^{2} (220.6/sq mi) in 2021.

In the 2016 Census of Population conducted by Statistics Canada, the Summer Village of West Baptiste had a population of 38 living in 19 of its 47 total private dwellings, a −26.9% change from its 2011 population of 52. With a land area of 0.65 km^{2} (0.25 sq mi), it had a population density of 58.5/km^{2} (151.4/sq mi) in 2016.

== See also ==
- List of communities in Alberta
- List of summer villages in Alberta
- List of resort villages in Saskatchewan
