= Itaska Beach =

- Summer village
- Summer Village of Itaska Beach
- Location of Itaska Beach in Alberta
- Coordinates: 53.07130°N 114.078°W
- Country: Canada
- Province: Alberta
- Region: Edmonton Metropolitan Region
- Census division: No. 11

Government
  - Type: Municipal incorporation
  - Mayor: Rex Nielsen
  - Governing body: Itaska Beach Summer Village Council

Area (2021)
  - Land: 0.26 km^{2} (0.10 sq mi)

Population (2021)
  - Total: 30
  - Density: 113.4/km^{2} (294/sq mi)
- Time zone: UTC−06:00 (Alberta Time)
- Website: Official website

Itaska Beach is a summer village in Alberta, Canada. It is located on the northwest shore of Pigeon Lake, west of Wetaskiwin.

The name derives from ispâskweyâw (ᐃᐢᐹᐢᑫᐧᔮᐤ), the Cree words for "high trees on the edge of woods".

== Demographics ==
In the 2021 Census of Population conducted by Statistics Canada, the Summer Village of Itaska Beach had a population of 30 living in 14 of its 73 total private dwellings, a change of 30.4% from its 2016 population of 23. With a land area of 0.26 km^{2} (0.10 sq mi), it had a population density of 115.4/km^{2} (298.8/sq mi) in 2021.

In the 2016 Census of Population conducted by Statistics Canada, the Summer Village of Itaska Beach had a population of 23 living in 10 of its 78 total private dwellings, a 15% change from its 2011 population of 20. With a land area of 0.29 km^{2} (0.11 sq mi), it had a population density of 79.3/km^{2} (205.4/sq mi) in 2016.

== See also ==
- List of communities in Alberta
- List of summer villages in Alberta
- List of resort villages in Saskatchewan
