= Hasse Lake (Alberta) =

Lake in Alberta, Canada

- Location within Alberta
- Location: Parkland County, Alberta
- Coordinates: 53°29′09″N 114°10′23″W
- Basin countries: Canada
- Max. length: 1.3 km (0.81 mi)
- Max. width: 1 km (0.62 mi)
- Surface area: 0.90 km^{2} (0.35 sq mi)
- Average depth: 3.5 m (11 ft)
- Max. depth: 7.4 m (24 ft)
- Residence time: >100
- Shore length^{1}: 5.8 km (3.6 mi)
- Surface elevation: 728.57 m (2,390.3 ft)
- Settlements: Spring Lake
- References: Hasse Lake
- ^{1} Shore length is not a well-defined measure.

Hasse Lake is a lake in Alberta.
