= Mulhurst Bay =

Mulhurst Bay Mulhurst
- Hamlet
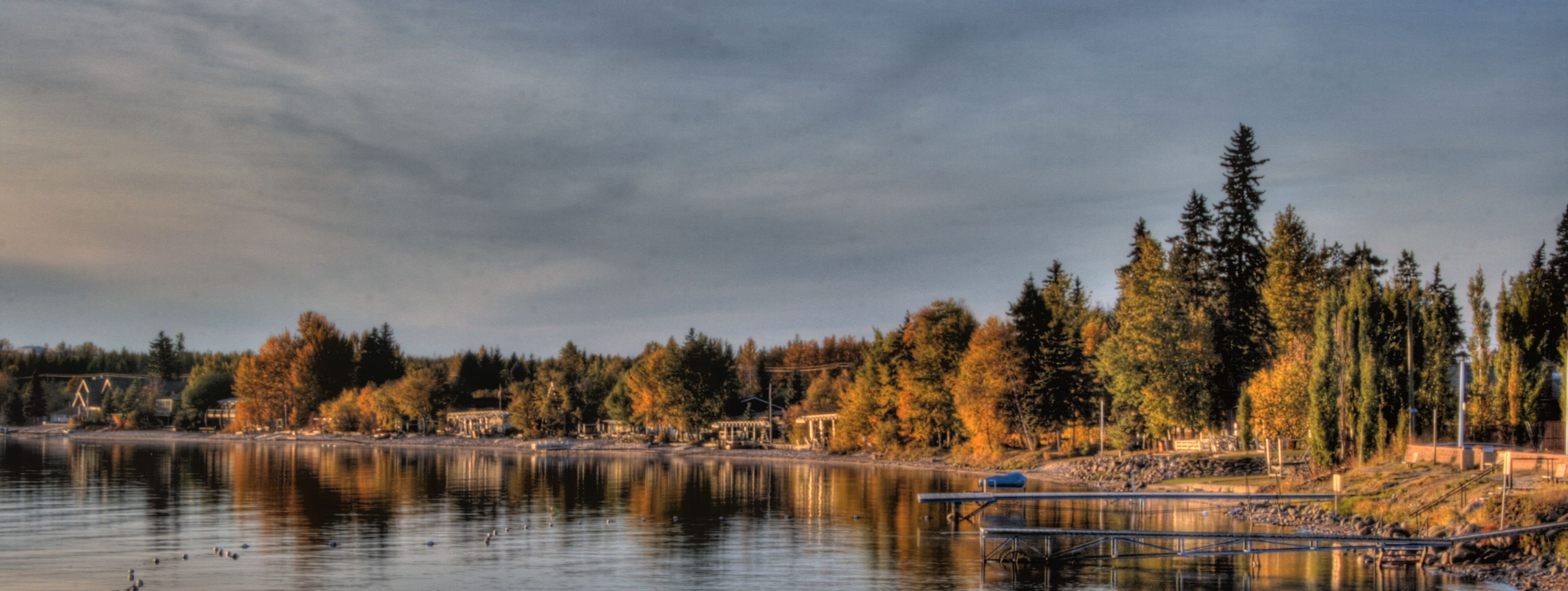
- Houses and docks along the south side of Mulhurst Bay

- Location of Mulhurst Bay Mulhurst Bay (Canada)
- Coordinates: 53°03′16″N 113°59′44″W
- Country: Canada
- Province: Alberta
- Region: Central Alberta
- Census division: 11
- Municipal district: County of Wetaskiwin No. 10

Government
  - Type: Unincorporated
  - Governing body: County of Wetaskiwin No. 10 Council

Area (2021)
  - Land: 4.36 km^{2} (1.68 sq mi)

Population (2021)
  - Total: 447
  - Density: 102.6/km^{2} (266/sq mi)
- Time zone: UTC−06:00 (Alberta Time)
- Area codes: 780, 587, 825

Mulhurst Bay, or Mulhurst, is a hamlet in central Alberta, Canada within the County of Wetaskiwin No. 10. It is located 8 kilometres (5.0 mi) northwest of Highway 13A, approximately 38 kilometres (24 mi) southwest of Leduc.

== Demographics ==
Population history of Mulhurst Bay
Year	Pop.	±%
1941	103	—
1951	95	−7.8%
1956	140	+47.4%
1961	152	+8.6%
1966	109	−28.3%
1971	139	+27.5%
1976	104	−25.2%
1981	165	+58.7%
1986	152	−7.9%
1991	301	+98.0%
1991A	305	+1.3%
1996	286	−6.2%
2001	313	+9.4%
2006	324	+3.5%
2011	295	−9.0%
2016	334	+13.2%
2016R	431	+29.0%
2021	447	+3.7%
Source: Statistics Canada

In the 2021 Census of Population conducted by Statistics Canada, Mulhurst Bay had a population of 447 living in 216 of its 384 total private dwellings, a change of 3.7% from its 2016 population of 431. With a land area of 4.36 km^{2} (1.68 sq mi), it had a population density of 102.5/km^{2} (265.5/sq mi) in 2021.

As a designated place in the 2016 Census of Population conducted by Statistics Canada, by combining parts "A" and "B", Mulhurst Bay had a population of 334 living in 165 of its 337 total private dwellings, a change of 13.2% from its 2011 population of 295. With a land area of 2.89 km^{2} (1.12 sq mi), it had a population density of 115.6/km^{2} (299.3/sq mi) in 2016.

== See also ==
- List of communities in Alberta
- List of designated places in Alberta
- List of hamlets in Alberta
