= Cooking Lake (Alberta) =

Lake in Alberta, Canada

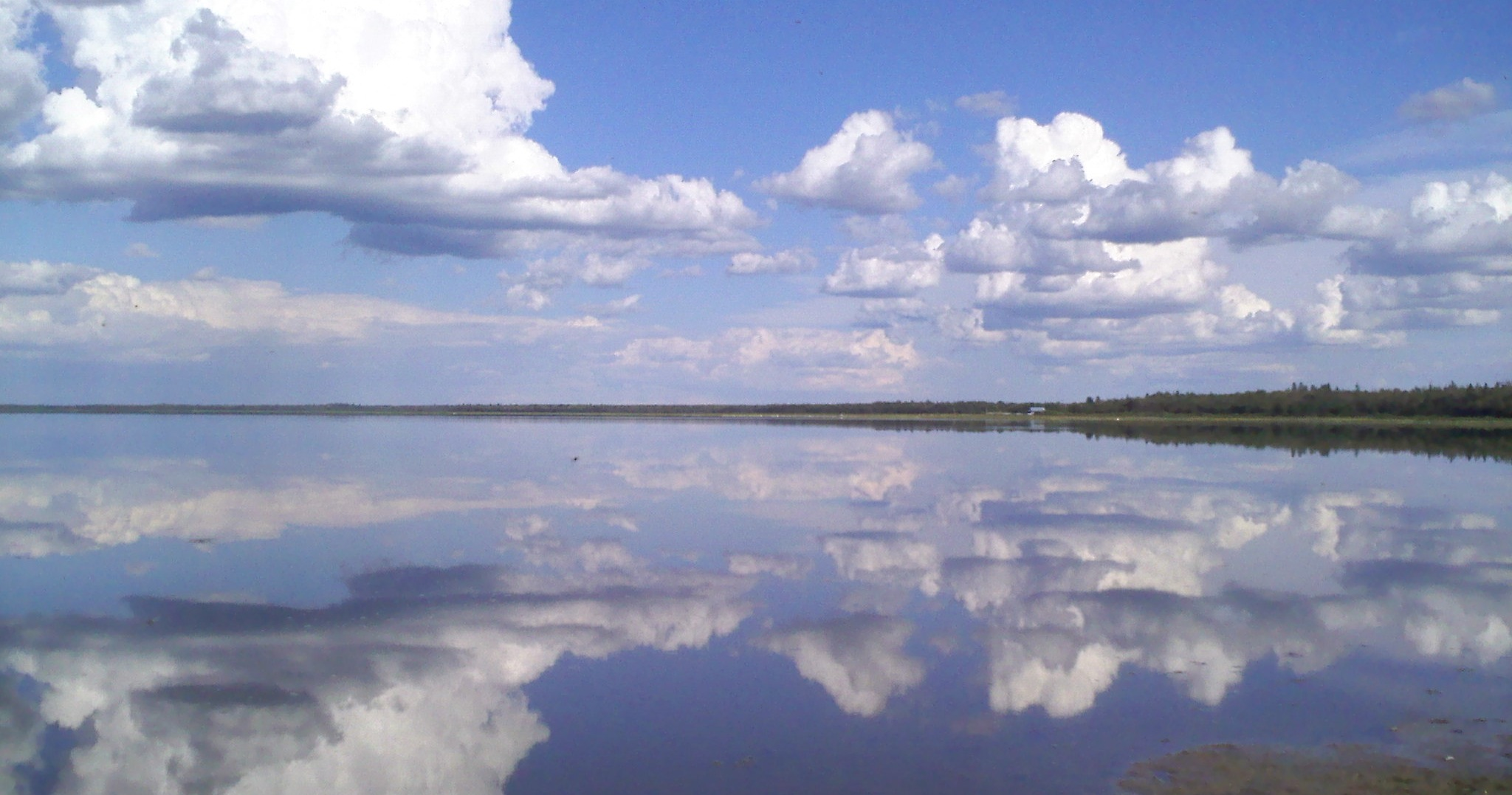
- From South Cooking Lake

- Location within Alberta
- Location: Strathcona County, Alberta
- Coordinates: 53°25′59″N 113°01′45″W
- Basin countries: Canada
- Max. length: 5.3 km (3.3 mi)
- Max. width: 12 km (7.5 mi)
- Surface area: 36 km^{2} (14 sq mi)
- Average depth: 1.7 m (5 ft 7 in)
- Max. depth: 4.6 m (15 ft)
- Surface elevation: 737 m (2,418 ft)
- Settlements: North Cooking Lake; South Cooking Lake
- References: Cooking Lake

Cooking Lake is a lake in Alberta, Canada. It is located in Strathcona County, east-southeast of Edmonton. Edmonton/Cooking Lake Water Aerodrome is located on this lake.

Cooking Lake's name is a calque of its Cree language name, opiminawasu.

== Fish and fisheries ==
Fishing has historically been an activity commonly performed at Cooking Lake. A 1907 advertisement for Oban Beach encouraged visitors to participate in boating, fishing and shooting.

In 1908, smallmouth bass were stocked in the lake as part of an effort to introduce sport-fishing species into Alberta lakes.

Cooking Lake has historically had limited populations of fish, despite the popularity of recreational fishing at the lake. A 1965 study recorded a small number of brook sticklebacks in the lake but no other fish, and attributed their absence to low oxygen conditions and winterkill.

A study of the lake's shoreline described eutrophic conditions, meaning the lake was rich in algae, though the previously mentioned oxygen depletion posed such a large threat to organisms in the area that the lake could not sustain most fish species.

By the summer of 2024, the lake had diminished to less than five per cent of its former surface area.
