= North Cooking Lake =

- Hamlet
- Location of North Cooking Lake in Alberta
- Coordinates: 53°27′41″N 112°56′21″W
- Country: Canada
- Province: Alberta
- Region: Edmonton Region
- Census division: 11
- Specialized municipality: Strathcona County

Government
  - Type: Unincorporated
  - Mayor: Rod Frank
  - Governing body: Strathcona County Council: Dave Anderson; Katie Berghofer; Brian Botterill; Linton Delainey; Glen Lawrence; Robert Parks; Paul Smith; Bill Tonita

Area (2021)
  - Land: 0.41 km^{2} (0.16 sq mi)
- Elevation: 752 m (2,467 ft)

Population (2021)
  - Total: 20
  - Density: 48.4/km^{2} (125/sq mi)
- Time zone: UTC−06:00 (Alberta Time)
- Postal code span: T8G
- Area code: +1-780
- Highways: Highway 630
- Website: Strathcona County

North Cooking Lake is a hamlet in Alberta, Canada within Strathcona County. It is located on Highway 630 and on the northeast shore of Cooking Lake, approximately 24 kilometres (15 mi) southeast of Sherwood Park. It is 4 kilometres (2.5 mi) south of the Waskehegan Staging Area entrance to Cooking Lake-Blackfoot Grazing, Wildlife Provincial Recreation Area.

Due to the multiple lakes nearby with sandy beaches, North Cooking Lake was known as one of Edmonton's recreation and resort spots in the early 1900s (decade). It was so popular that special trains operated to bring vacationers to the North Cooking Lake Station where steamers and motor boats delivered them to different resorts. Once a teeming playground, North Cooking Lake is now a peaceful residential retreat.

== Demographics ==
The population of North Cooking Lake according to the 2024 municipal census conducted by Strathcona County is 53, a 10.4% change from its 2022 municipal census population count of 48.

In the 2021 Census of Population conducted by Statistics Canada, North Cooking Lake had a population of 20 living in 9 of its 9 total private dwellings, a change of −35.5% from its 2016 population of 31. With a land area of 0.41 km^{2} (0.16 sq mi), it had a population density of 48.8/km^{2} (126.3/sq mi) in 2021.

As a designated place in the 2016 Census of Population conducted by Statistics Canada, North Cooking Lake had a population of 31 living in 9 of its 9 total private dwellings, a change of 34.8% from its 2011 population of 23. With a land area of 0.41 km^{2} (0.16 sq mi), it had a population density of 75.6/km^{2} (195.8/sq mi) in 2016.

== See also ==
- List of communities in Alberta
- List of hamlets in Alberta
