= Ma-Me-O Beach =

- Summer village
- Summer Village of Ma-Me-O Beach
- Location of Ma-Me-O Beach in Alberta
- Coordinates: 52°58′35.87″N 113°57′35.46″W
- Country: Canada
- Province: Alberta
- Census division: No. 11

Government
  - Type: Municipal incorporation
  - Mayor: Christine Holmes
  - Governing body: Ma-Me-O Beach Summer Village Council

Area (2021)
  - Land: 0.56 km^{2} (0.22 sq mi)

Population (2021)
  - Total: 128
- Time zone: UTC−06:00 (Alberta Time)
- Website: mameobeach.ca

Ma-Me-O Beach, Alberta, is a summer village on the southeast shore of Pigeon Lake, in Alberta, Canada. It is located approximately 100 km (60 mi) southwest of Edmonton.

Ma-Me-O derives from the Cree word for "pigeon", omîmîw (ᐅᒦᒦᐤ). It was founded in 1924.

== Demographics ==
In the 2021 Census of Population conducted by Statistics Canada, the Summer Village of Ma-Me-O Beach had a population of 128 living in 64 of its 254 total private dwellings, a change of 16.4% from its 2016 population of 110. With a land area of 0.56 km^{2} (0.22 sq mi), it had a population density of 228.6/km^{2} (592.0/sq mi) in 2021.

In the 2016 Census of Population conducted by Statistics Canada, the Summer Village of Ma-Me-O Beach had a population of 110 living in 63 of its 259 total private dwellings, a −2.7% change from its 2011 population of 113. With a land area of 0.52 km^{2} (0.20 sq mi), it had a population density of 211.5/km^{2} (547.9/sq mi) in 2016.

== Arts and culture ==
During a tour of western Canada, English recording artist Joan Armatrading, who recorded for A&M Records saw the road sign for Ma-Me-O Beach and liked the name so much that she later used it as a song title. The song was included on her 1980 album Me Myself I.

Later, in 2012 Edmonton musician Christian Hansen released a song and music video which also utilized the village's name on his album C'mon Arizona.

== Education ==
Residents of Ma-Me-O Beach are assigned to schools in the Wetaskiwin Regional Division No. 11, with Lakedell School serving primary grades and Pigeon Lake Regional School serving secondary grades.

== See also ==
- List of communities in Alberta
- List of francophone communities in Alberta
- List of summer villages in Alberta
- List of resort villages in Saskatchewan
