= Buck Lake, Alberta =

Buck Lake
- Hamlet
- Location of Buck Lake Buck Lake (Canada)
- Coordinates: 52°57′06″N 114°46′24″W
- Country: Canada
- Province: Alberta
- Region: Central Alberta
- Census division: 11
- Municipal district: County of Wetaskiwin No. 10

Government
  - Type: Unincorporated
  - Governing body: County of Wetaskiwin No. 10 Council

Area (2021)
  - Land: 1.37 km^{2} (0.53 sq mi)

Population (2021)
  - Total: 60
  - Density: 43.8/km^{2} (113/sq mi)
- Time zone: UTC−06:00 (Alberta Time)
- Area codes: 780, 587, 825

Buck Lake is a hamlet in central Alberta, Canada within the County of Wetaskiwin No. 10. It is located on Highway 13, approximately 109 kilometres (68 mi) southwest of Edmonton. It is located on the shore of Buck Lake.

== Demographics ==
Population history of Buck Lake
Year	Pop.	±%
1956	307	—
1961	213	−30.6%
1966	181	−15.0%
1971	159	−12.2%
1976	169	+6.3%
1981	109	−35.5%
1986	91	−16.5%
1991	63	−30.8%
1991A	68	+7.9%
1996	71	+4.4%
2001	79	+11.3%
2006	129	+63.3%
2011	75	−41.9%
2016	51	−32.0%
2021	60	+17.6%
Source: Statistics Canada

In the 2021 Census of Population conducted by Statistics Canada, Buck Lake had a population of 60 living in 35 of its 72 total private dwellings, a change of 17.6% from its 2016 population of 51. With a land area of 1.37 km^{2} (0.53 sq mi), it had a population density of 43.8/km^{2} (113.4/sq mi) in 2021.

As a designated place in the 2016 Census of Population conducted by Statistics Canada, Buck Lake had a population of 51 living in 23 of its 57 total private dwellings, a change of −32% from its 2011 population of 75. With a land area of 1.27 km^{2} (0.49 sq mi), it had a population density of 40.2/km^{2} (104.0/sq mi) in 2016.

== See also ==
- List of communities in Alberta
- List of designated places in Alberta
- List of hamlets in Alberta
