= Spring Lake, Alberta =

Spring Lake Edmonton Beach (1959–1998)
- Village
- Village of Spring Lake
- Location of Spring Lake in Alberta
- Coordinates: 53°31′07″N 114°07′59″W
- Country: Canada
- Province: Alberta
- Region: Edmonton Metropolitan Region
- Census Division: 11
- Municipal district: Parkland County
- Incorporated
  - Summer village: January 1, 1959 (as Edmonton Beach)
  - Village/name change: January 1, 1999

Government
  - Mayor: Jason Shewchuk
  - Governing body: Spring Lake Village Council

Area (2021)
  - Land: 2.28 km^{2} (0.88 sq mi)
- Elevation: 740 m (2,430 ft)

Population (2021)
  - Total: 711
  - Density: 312.3/km^{2} (809/sq mi)
- Time zone: UTC−06:00 (Alberta Time)
- Highways: 16A
- Waterways: Spring Lake
- Website: Official website

Spring Lake, originally named Edmonton Beach, is a village in central Alberta, Canada. It is located on the eastern shore of Spring Lake, approximately 20 km (12 mi) and 40 km (25 mi) west of the cities of Spruce Grove and Edmonton respectively. Hasse Lake is located 6 km (3.7 mi) southwest of Spring Lake. It was known as the Summer Village of Edmonton Beach from 1959 to 1999.

== Demographics ==
In the 2021 Census of Population conducted by Statistics Canada, the Village of Spring Lake had a population of 711 living in 286 of its 308 total private dwellings, a change of 1.7% from its 2016 population of 699. With a land area of 2.28 km^{2} (0.88 sq mi), it had a population density of 311.8/km^{2} (807.7/sq mi) in 2021.

In the 2016 Census of Population conducted by Statistics Canada, the Village of Spring Lake recorded a population of 699 living in 261 of its 303 total private dwellings, a 31.1% change from its 2011 population of 533. With a land area of 2.33 km^{2} (0.90 sq mi), it had a population density of 300.0/km^{2} (777.0/sq mi) in 2016.

The Village of Spring Lake's 2012 municipal census counted a population of 614, a 3.7% increase over its 2007 municipal census population of 592.

== Services ==
There is a large RV park on the east side of the lake, which has a small camping store which sells candy, newspapers, and a variety of camping items. Other than this there are no commercial businesses in the village.

== See also ==
- List of communities in Alberta
- List of villages in Alberta
