= Betula Beach =

- Summer village
- Summer Village of Betula Beach
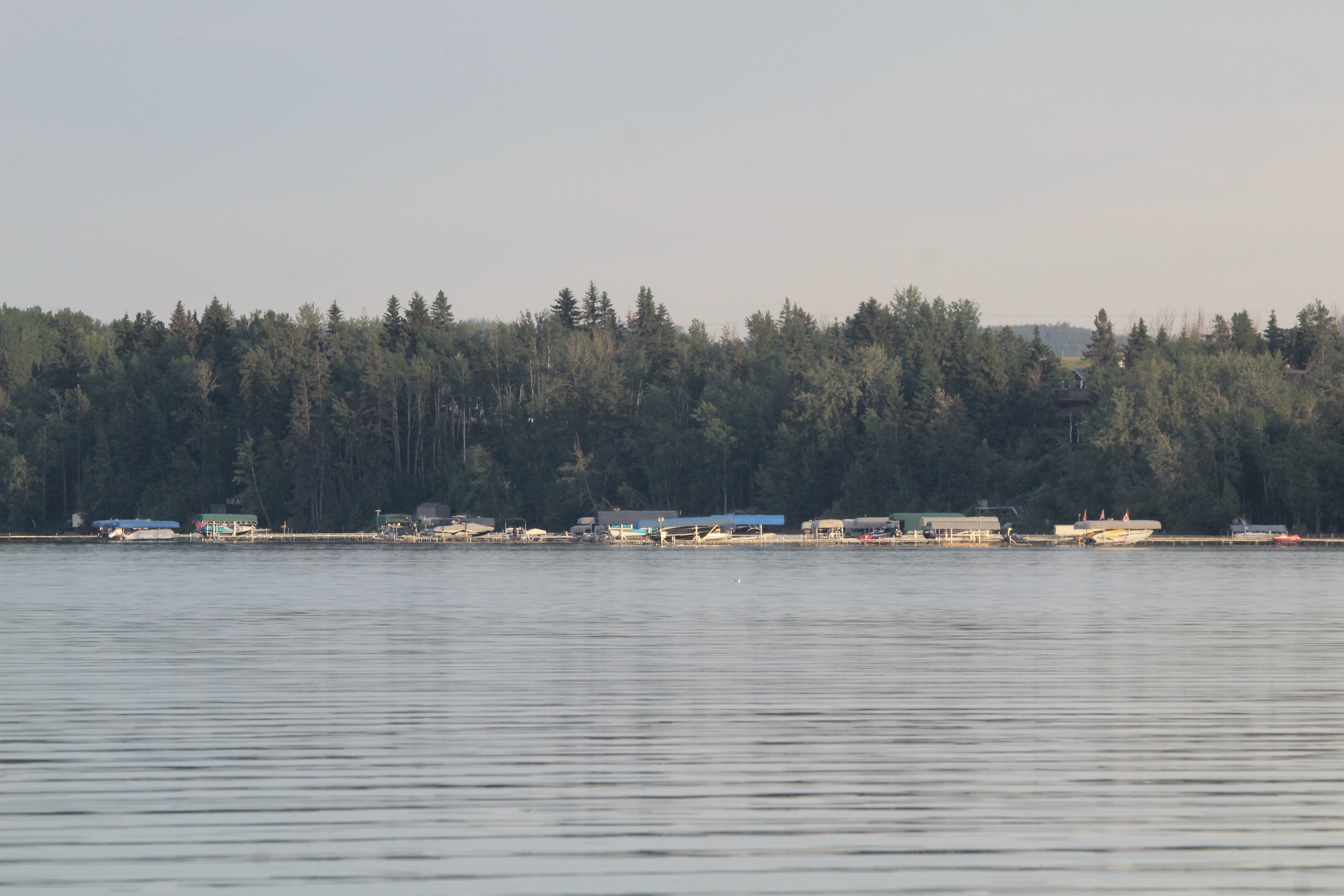

- Location of Betula Beach in Alberta
- Coordinates: 53°32′34″N 114°41′12″W
- Country: Canada
- Province: Alberta
- Region: Edmonton Metropolitan Region
- Census division: No. 11

Government
  - Type: Municipal incorporation
  - Mayor: Rob Dickie
  - Governing body: Betula Beach Summer Village Council

Area (2021)
  - Land: 0.23 km^{2} (0.089 sq mi)

Population (2021)
  - Total: 27
  - Density: 118.5/km^{2} (307/sq mi)
- Time zone: UTC−06:00 (Alberta Time)
- Website: www.betulabeach.ca

Betula Beach is a summer village on Wabamun Lake in Alberta, Canada.

== Demographics ==
In the 2021 Census of Population conducted by Statistics Canada, the Summer Village of Betula Beach had a population of 27 living in 14 of its 46 total private dwellings, a change of 68.8% from its 2016 population of 16. With a land area of 0.23 km^{2} (0.089 sq mi), it had a population density of 117.4/km^{2} (304.0/sq mi) in 2021.

In the 2016 Census of Population conducted by Statistics Canada, the Summer Village of Betula Beach had a population of 16 living in 7 of its 40 total private dwellings, a 60% change from its 2011 population of 10. With a land area of 0.25 km^{2} (0.097 sq mi), it had a population density of 64.0/km^{2} (165.8/sq mi) in 2016.

== See also ==
- List of communities in Alberta
- List of summer villages in Alberta
- List of resort villages in Saskatchewan
