= Buck Lake (Ontario) =

Lake in South Frontenac, Ontario, Canada

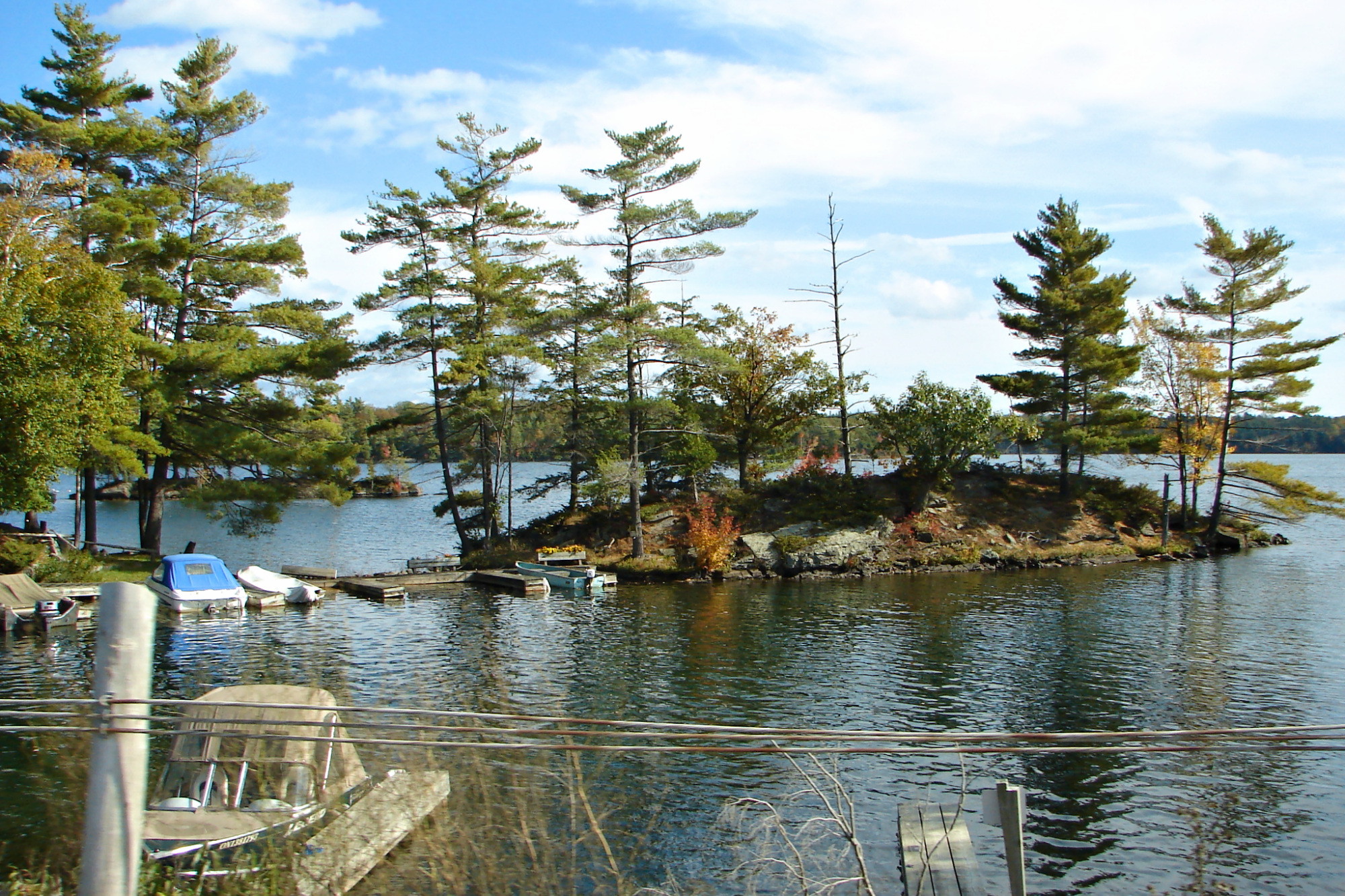

- Location in Southern Ontario
- Location: South Frontenac, Ontario, Canada
- Coordinates: 44°32′17″N 76°26′18″W
- Water volume: 25,900,000 cubic metres (910,000,000 cu ft)
- Surface elevation: 130 metres (430 ft) above sea level
- Website: Buck Lake Association

Buck Lake is a lake located in South Frontenac, Ontario, Canada. Its inflows are Milk Lake and various rivers and its outflow is the Mississauga Creek through a dam. It has a surface area of 787 hectares (1,940 acres).

The lake has an average depth of 11.9 metres (39 ft) but can reach depths up to 40.9 metres (134 ft). It has an approximate shore length of 48.2 kilometres (30.0 mi).

== See also ==
- List of lakes in Ontario
