= Silver Beach, Alberta =

Silver Beach
- Summer village
- Summer Village of Silver Beach
- Location of Silver Beach in Alberta
- Coordinates: 53.03465°N 113.98951°W
- Country: Canada
- Province: Alberta
- Census division: No. 11

Government
  - Type: Municipal incorporation
  - Mayor: Allan Watt
  - Governing body: Silver Beach Summer Village Council

Area (2021)
  - Land: 0.61 km^{2} (0.24 sq mi)

Population (2021)
  - Total: 55
  - Density: 90.5/km^{2} (234/sq mi)
- Time zone: UTC−06:00 (Alberta Time)
- Website: Official website

Silver Beach is a summer village in Alberta, Canada. It is located on the eastern shore of Pigeon Lake, west from Wetaskiwin.

== Demographics ==
In the 2021 Census of Population conducted by Statistics Canada, the Summer Village of Silver Beach had a population of 55 living in 31 of its 99 total private dwellings, a change of −15.4% from its 2016 population of 65. With a land area of 0.61 km^{2} (0.24 sq mi), it had a population density of 90.2/km^{2} (233.5/sq mi) in 2021.

In the 2016 Census of Population conducted by Statistics Canada, the Summer Village of Silver Beach had a population of 65 living in 31 of its 100 total private dwellings, a 25% change from its 2011 population of 52. With a land area of 0.64 km^{2} (0.25 sq mi), it had a population density of 101.6/km^{2} (263.0/sq mi) in 2016.

== See also ==
- List of communities in Alberta
- List of summer villages in Alberta
- List of resort villages in Saskatchewan
