= Golden Days, Alberta =

Golden Days
- Summer village
- Summer Village of Golden Days
- Location of Golden Days in Alberta
- Coordinates: 53.05585°N 114.06268°W
- Country: Canada
- Province: Alberta
- Region: Edmonton Metropolitan Region
- Census division: No. 11

Government
  - Type: Municipal incorporation
  - Mayor: Brian Park
  - Governing body: Golden Days Summer Village Council

Area (2021)
  - Land: 2.13 km^{2} (0.82 sq mi)

Population (2021)
  - Total: 248
  - Density: 116.7/km^{2} (302/sq mi)
- Time zone: UTC−06:00 (Alberta Time)
- Website: Official website

Golden Days is a summer village in Alberta, Canada. It is located on the northwestern shore of Pigeon Lake.

== Demographics ==
In the 2021 Census of Population conducted by Statistics Canada, the Summer Village of Golden Days had a population of 248 living in 117 of its 284 total private dwellings, a change of 55% from its 2016 population of 160. With a land area of 2.13 km^{2} (0.82 sq mi), it had a population density of 116.4/km^{2} (301.6/sq mi) in 2021.

In the 2016 Census of Population conducted by Statistics Canada, the Summer Village of Golden Days had a population of 160 living in 78 of its 293 total private dwellings, a 13.5% change from its 2011 population of 141. With a land area of 2.28 km^{2} (0.88 sq mi), it had a population density of 70.2/km^{2} (181.8/sq mi) in 2016.

== See also ==
- List of communities in Alberta
- List of summer villages in Alberta
- List of resort villages in Saskatchewan
