= Sundance Beach =

- Summer village
- Summer Village of Sundance Beach
- Location of Sundance Beach in Alberta
- Coordinates: 53.08032°N 114.10302°W
- Country: Canada
- Province: Alberta
- Region: Edmonton Metropolitan Region
- Census division: No. 11

Government
  - Type: Municipal incorporation
  - Mayor: Brian Waterhouse
  - Governing body: Sundance Beach Summer Village Council

Area (2021)
  - Land: 0.43 km^{2} (0.17 sq mi)

Population (2021)
  - Total: 42
  - Density: 98.3/km^{2} (255/sq mi)
- Time zone: UTC−06:00 (Alberta Time)
- Website: Official website

Sundance Beach is a summer village in Alberta, Canada. It is located on the northern shore of Pigeon Lake. Mission Beach is an adjacent locality within Leduc County.

== Demographics ==
In the 2021 Census of Population conducted by Statistics Canada, the Summer Village of Sundance Beach had a population of 42 living in 26 of its 68 total private dwellings, a change of −42.5% from its 2016 population of 73. With a land area of 0.43 km^{2} (0.17 sq mi), it had a population density of 97.7/km^{2} (253.0/sq mi) in 2021.

In the 2016 Census of Population conducted by Statistics Canada, the Summer Village of Sundance Beach had a population of 73 living in 31 of its 148 total private dwellings, a change of −11% from its 2011 population of 82. With a land area of 0.44 km^{2} (0.17 sq mi), it had a population density of 165.9/km^{2} (429.7/sq mi) in 2016.

== See also ==
- List of communities in Alberta
- List of francophone communities in Alberta
- List of summer villages in Alberta
- List of resort villages in Saskatchewan
