= Argentia Beach =

- Summer village
- Summer Village of Argentia Beach
- Location of Argentia Beach in Alberta
- Coordinates: 53.05339°N 114.02322°W
- Country: Canada
- Province: Alberta
- Census division: No. 11

Government
  - Type: Municipal incorporation
  - Mayor: Donald Oborowsky
  - Governing body: Argentia Beach Summer Village Council

Area (2021)
  - Land: 0.62 km^{2} (0.24 sq mi)

Population (2021)
  - Total: 39
  - Density: 63.3/km^{2} (164/sq mi)
- Time zone: UTC−06:00 (Alberta Time)
- Website: Official website

Argentia Beach is a summer village in Alberta, Canada. It is located on the northern shore of Pigeon Lake.

== Demographics ==
In the 2021 Census of Population conducted by Statistics Canada, the Summer Village of Argentia Beach had a population of 39 living in 25 of its 101 total private dwellings, a change of 44.4% from its 2016 population of 27. With a land area of 0.62 km^{2} (0.24 sq mi), it had a population density of 62.9/km^{2} (162.9/sq mi) in 2021.

In the 2016 Census of Population conducted by Statistics Canada, the Summer Village of Argentia Beach had a population of 27 living in 17 of its 100 total private dwellings, an increase of 80% from its 2011 population of 15. With a land area of 0.73 km^{2} (0.28 sq mi), it had a population density of 37.0/km^{2} (95.8/sq mi) in 2016.

== See also ==
- List of communities in Alberta
- List of summer villages in Alberta
- List of resort villages in Saskatchewan
