= County of Wetaskiwin No. 10 =

Municipal district in Alberta, Canada

- Municipal district
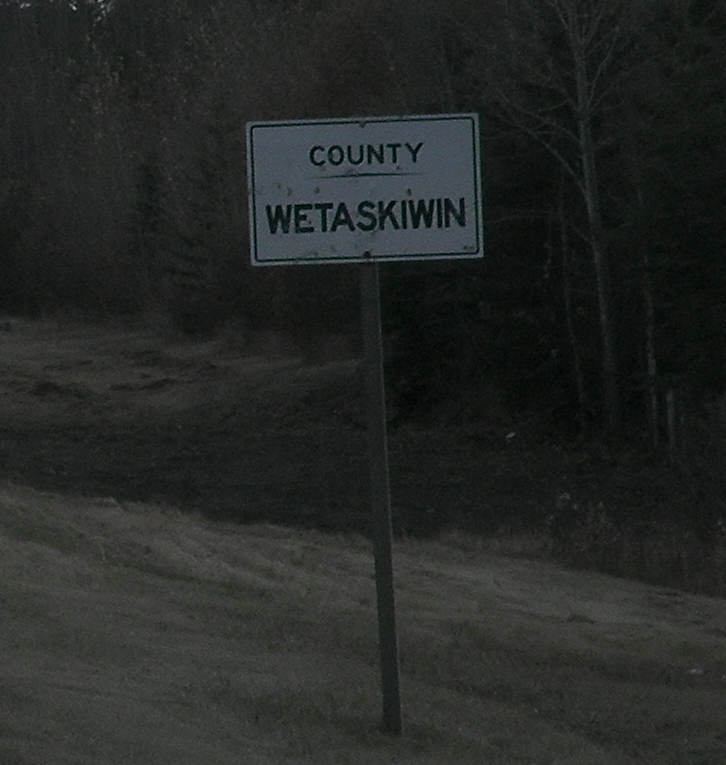
- County line sign

- Location within Alberta
- Coordinates: 52°58′10″N 113°22′37″W
- Country: Canada
- Province: Alberta
- Region: Central Alberta
- Census division: 11
- Established: 1943
- Incorporated: 1958 (County)

Government
  - Reeve: Josh Bishop
  - Governing body: County of Wetaskiwin Council: Dale Woitt; Bill Krahn; Josh Bishop; Ken Adair; Kathy Rooyakkers; Lyle Seely; Lynn Carwell
  - Administrator: Scott MacDougall
  - Administrative office: Wetaskiwin

Area (2021)
  - Land: 3,121.98 km^{2} (1,205.40 sq mi)

Population (2021)
  - Total: 11,217
- Time zone: UTC−06:00 (Alberta Time)
- Website: county.wetaskiwin.ab.ca

The County of Wetaskiwin No. 10 is a municipal district in central Alberta, Canada that is south of Edmonton. Located in Census Division No. 11, its municipal office is in located in the City of Wetaskiwin.

== Geography ==
=== Communities and localities ===
The following urban municipalities are surrounded by the County of Wetaskiwin No. 10.

Cities

- Wetaskiwin

Towns

- Millet

Villages

- none

Summer villages

- Argentia Beach
- Crystal Springs
- Grandview
- Ma-Me-O Beach
- Norris Beach
- Poplar Bay
- Silver Beach

The following hamlets are located within the County of Wetaskiwin No. 10.

Hamlets

- Alder Flats
- Buck Lake
- Falun
- Gwynne
- Mulhurst Bay
- Village at Pigeon Lake
- Westerose
- Winfield

The following localities are located within the County of Wetaskiwin No. 10.

Localities

- Aspen Acres
- Battle Lake
- Beachside Estates
- Bevetta Estates
- Brightview
- Curilane Beach
- Fairview Heights
- Ganske
- Grandview Heights
- Knob Hill
- Lakeland Estates
- Lakeside Country Estates
- Lansdowne Park
- Larch Tree Park
- Malmo
- Maywood Bay
- Maywood Subdivision
- Modest Creek Estates

- Mullendale
- Norbuck
- Nordic Place
- Peace Hills Heights
- Peace Hills Park
- Pendryl Store
- Pineridge Downs
- Pipestone
- Pipestone Village
- Springtree Park
- Thompson Subdivision
- Town Lake
- Usona
- Viola Beach
- Willowhaven Estates
- Wizard Heights

== Demographics ==
In the 2021 census conducted by Statistics Canada, the County of Wetaskiwin No. 10 had a population of 11,217 living in 4,492 of its 5,677 total private dwellings, a change of 0.4% from its 2016 population of 11,176. With a land area of 3,121.98 km^{2} (1,205.40 sq mi), it had a population density of 3.6/km^{2} (9.3/sq mi).

In the 2016 census conducted by Statistics Canada, the County of Wetaskiwin No. 10 had a population of 11,181 living in 4,372 of its 5,556 total private dwellings, a 2.9% change from its 2011 population of 10,866. With a land area of 3,132.06 km^{2} (1,209.30 sq mi), it had a population density of 3.6/km^{2} (9.2/sq mi).

== See also ==
- List of communities in Alberta
- List of municipal districts in Alberta
