= Norris Beach =

- Summer village
- Summer Village of Norris Beach
- Location of Norris Beach in Alberta
- Coordinates: 52.96702°N 114.02603°W
- Country: Canada
- Province: Alberta
- Census division: No. 11

Government
  - Type: Municipal incorporation
  - Mayor: Brian Keeler
  - Governing body: Norris Beach Summer Village Council

Area (2021)
  - Land: 0.19 km^{2} (0.073 sq mi)

Population (2021)
  - Total: 71
  - Density: 369.8/km^{2} (958/sq mi)
- Time zone: UTC−06:00 (Alberta Time)
- Website: Official website

Norris Beach is a summer village in Alberta, Canada. It is located on the southern shore of Pigeon Lake, along Highway 13.

== Demographics ==
In the 2021 Census of Population conducted by Statistics Canada, the Summer Village of Norris Beach had a population of 71 living in 34 of its 92 total private dwellings, a change of 86.8% from its 2016 population of 38. With a land area of 0.19 km^{2} (0.073 sq mi), it had a population density of 373.7/km^{2} (967.8/sq mi) in 2021.

In the 2016 Census of Population conducted by Statistics Canada, the Summer Village of Norris Beach had a population of 38 living in 19 of its 94 total private dwellings, a −17.4% change from its 2011 population of 46. With a land area of 0.2 km^{2} (0.077 sq mi), it had a population density of 190.0/km^{2} (492.1/sq mi) in 2016.

== See also ==
- List of communities in Alberta
- List of summer villages in Alberta
- List of resort villages in Saskatchewan
