= Grandview, Alberta =

Grandview
- Summer village
- Summer Village of Grandview
- Location of Grandview in Alberta
- Coordinates: 52°59′32″N 114°03′30″W
- Country: Canada
- Province: Alberta
- Census division: No. 11

Government
  - Type: Municipal incorporation
  - Mayor: Donald Davidson
  - Governing body: Grandview Summer Village Council

Area (2021)
  - Land: 0.45 km^{2} (0.17 sq mi)

Population (2021)
  - Total: 143
  - Density: 316.7/km^{2} (820/sq mi)
- Time zone: UTC−06:00 (Alberta Time)
- Website: Official website

Grandview is a summer village in Alberta, Canada. It is located on the southwest shore of Pigeon Lake, in the County of Wetaskiwin No. 10.

== Demographics ==
In the 2021 Census of Population conducted by Statistics Canada, the Summer Village of Grandview had a population of 143 living in 75 of its 203 total private dwellings, a change of 31.2% from its 2016 population of 109. With a land area of 0.45 km^{2} (0.17 sq mi), it had a population density of 317.8/km^{2} (823.0/sq mi) in 2021.

In the 2016 Census of Population conducted by Statistics Canada, the Summer Village of Grandview had a population of 114 living in 57 of its 210 total private dwellings, a 5.6% change from its 2011 population of 108. With a land area of 0.79 km^{2} (0.31 sq mi), it had a population density of 144.3/km^{2} (373.7/sq mi) in 2016.

== See also ==
- List of communities in Alberta
- List of summer villages in Alberta
- List of resort villages in Saskatchewan
