= Poplar Bay =

- Summer village
- Summer Village of Poplar Bay
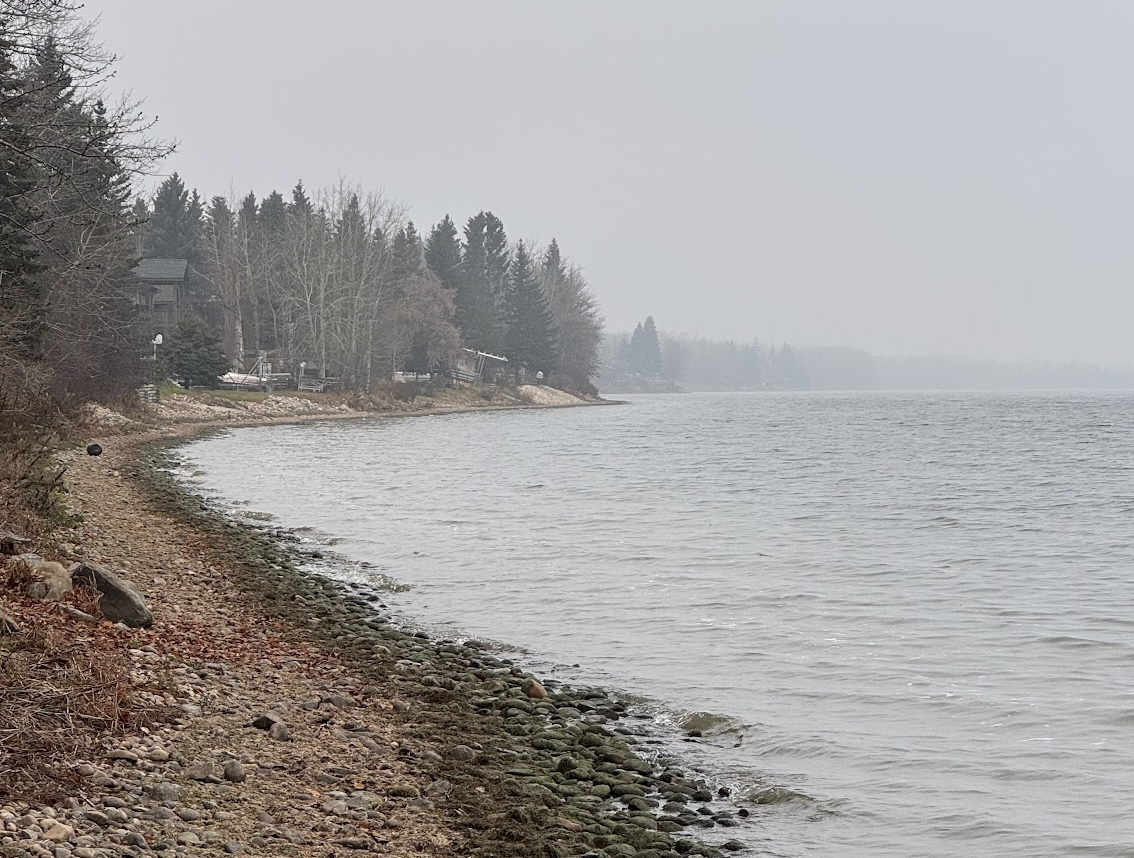
- Pigeon Lake Shoreline in Poplar Bay

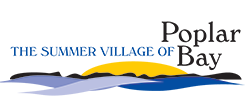
- Logo

- Location of Poplar Bay in Alberta
- Coordinates: 53.01131°N 114.11439°W
- Country: Canada
- Province: Alberta
- Census division: No. 11
- Incorporated: January 01, 1967

Government
  - Type: Municipal incorporation
  - Mayor: Fraser Hubbard
  - Governing body: Poplar Bay Summer Village Council

Area (2021)
  - Land: 0.71 km^{2} (0.27 sq mi)

Population (2021)
  - Total: 113
  - Density: 158.2/km^{2} (410/sq mi)
- Time zone: UTC−06:00 (Alberta Time)
- Website: poplarbay.ca

Poplar Bay is a summer village in Alberta, Canada. It is located on the western shore of Pigeon Lake.

== Demographics ==
In the 2021 Census of Population conducted by Statistics Canada, the Summer Village of Poplar Bay had a population of 113 living in 59 of its 182 total private dwellings, a change of 9.7% from its 2016 population of 103. With a land area of 0.71 km^{2} (0.27 sq mi), it had a population density of 159.2/km^{2} (412.2/sq mi) in 2021.

In the 2016 Census of Population conducted by Statistics Canada, the Summer Village of Poplar Bay had a population of 103 living in 46 of its 179 total private dwellings, a 28.8% change from its 2011 population of 80. With a land area of 0.67 km^{2} (0.26 sq mi), it had a population density of 153.7/km^{2} (398.2/sq mi) in 2016.

== See also ==
- List of communities in Alberta
- List of summer villages in Alberta
- List of resort villages in Saskatchewan
