= List of summer villages in Alberta =

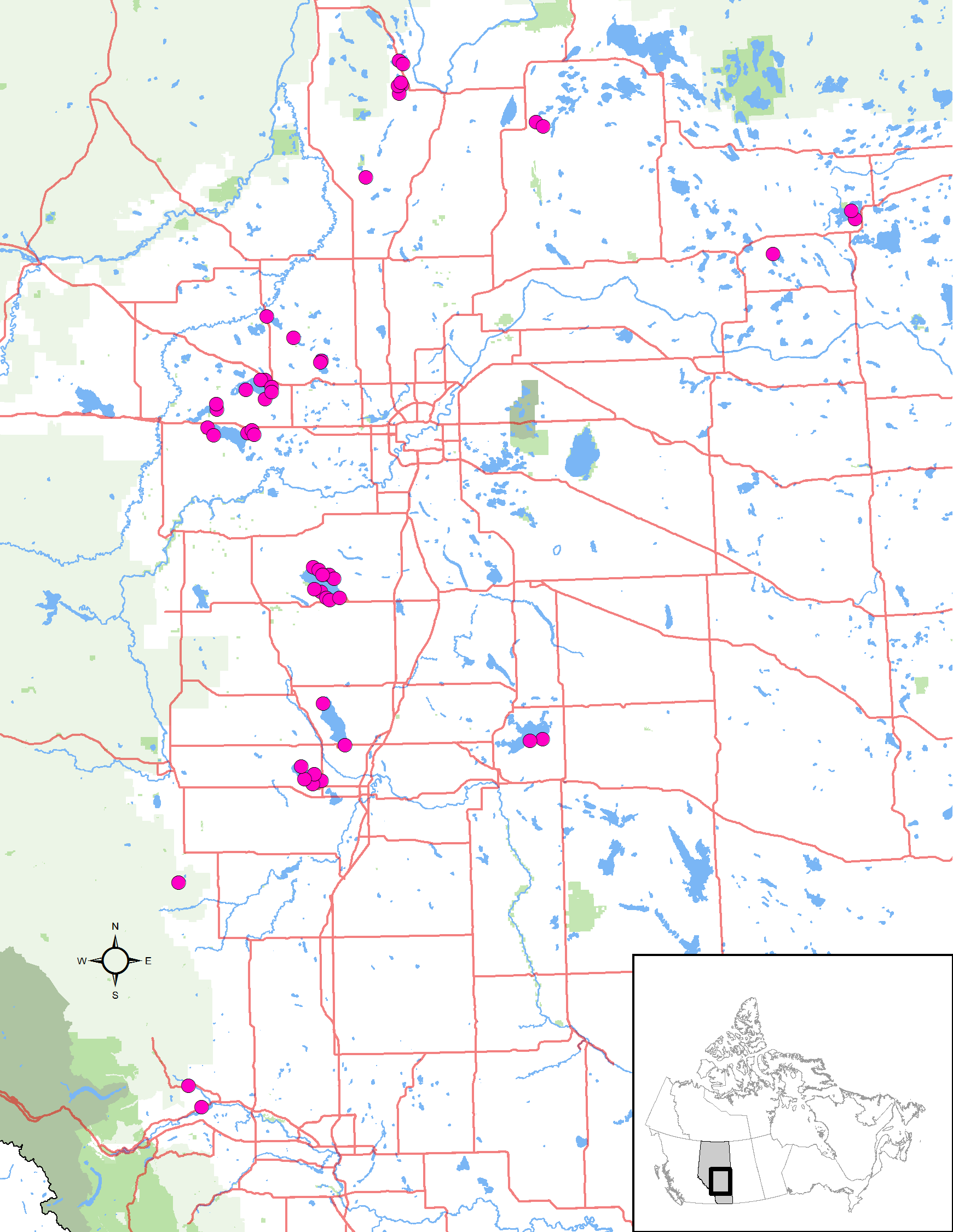
Distribution of Alberta's 51 summer villages

A summer village is a type of urban municipality in the Canadian province of Alberta that has a permanent population generally less than 300 permanent inhabitants, as well as seasonal (non-permanent) inhabitants.

Alberta has a total of 51 summer villages, which had a cumulative population of 5,921 and an average population of 116 in Canada's 2021 Census of Population. Alberta's largest summer village is Norglenwold with a population of 306 while Castle Island, is the smallest with a population of 15.

== History ==
A summer village is a type of municipal status used in Alberta, Canada, that was founded in 1913. It was used in resort areas that were mainly active in the summer and where most residents were seasonal. Cottage owners did not want to pay for unnecessary municipal services but wished to have a voice in local government of the resort area.

Changes were made to the provincial laws to allow elections to be held in July and to allow seasonal residents to run for office and vote in the summer village without losing these same rights in their place of permanent residence.

In 1995, provincial legislation was changed to prevent the formation of new summer villages. The 54 summer villages that existed at the time were permitted to continue to operate as before.

== List ==
List of summer villages in Alberta
Name	Rural municipality	Incorporation date (summer village)	2021 Census of Population				
Name	Rural municipality	Incorporation date (summer village)	Population (2021)	Population (2016)	Change	Land area (km^{2})	Population density (/km^{2})
Argentia Beach	Wetaskiwin No. 10, County of	January 1, 1967	39	27	+44.4%	0.62	62.9
Betula Beach	Parkland County	January 1, 1960	27	16	+68.8%	0.23	117.4
Birch Cove	Lac Ste. Anne County	December 31, 1988	67	45	+48.9%	0.29	231.0
Birchcliff	Lacombe County	January 1, 1972	211	117	+80.3%	0.97	217.5
Bondiss	Athabasca County	January 1, 1983	124	110	+12.7%	1.18	105.1
Bonnyville Beach	Bonnyville No. 87, M.D. of	January 1, 1958	70	84	−16.7%	0.23	304.3
Burnstick Lake	Clearwater County	December 31, 1991	21	15	+40.0%	0.18	116.7
Castle Island	Lac Ste. Anne County	January 1, 1955	15	10	+50.0%	0.05	300.0
Crystal Springs	Wetaskiwin No. 10, County of	January 1, 1957	74	51	+45.1%	0.45	164.4
Ghost Lake	Bighorn No. 8, M.D. of	December 31, 1953	82	82	0.0%	0.62	132.3
Golden Days	Leduc County	January 1, 1965	248	160	+55.0%	2.13	116.4
Grandview	Wetaskiwin No. 10, County of	January 1, 1967	143	109	+31.2%	0.45	317.8
Gull Lake	Lacombe County	September 1, 1993	226	176	+28.4%	0.7	322.9
Half Moon Bay	Lacombe County	January 1, 1978	65	42	+54.8%	0.12	541.7
Horseshoe Bay	St. Paul No. 19, County of	January 1, 1985	81	49	+65.3%	0.98	82.7
Island Lake	Athabasca County	January 1, 1958	174	228	−23.7%	1.55	112.3
Island Lake South	Athabasca County	January 1, 1983	81	61	+32.8%	0.48	168.8
Itaska Beach	Leduc County	June 30, 1953	30	23	+30.4%	0.26	115.4
Jarvis Bay	Red Deer County	January 1, 1986	213	213	0.0%	0.55	387.3
Kapasiwin	Parkland County	September 1, 1993	24	10	+140.0%	0.33	72.7
Lakeview	Parkland County	October 25, 1913	29	30	−3.3%	0.32	90.6
Larkspur	Westlock County	January 1, 1985	53	44	+20.5%	0.26	203.8
Ma-Me-O Beach	Wetaskiwin No. 10, County of	December 31, 1948	128 (Note: Originally published as 162, Ma-Me-O Beach's 2021 population was amended to 128 by Statistics Canada.)	110	+16.4%	0.56	228.6
Mewatha Beach	Athabasca County	January 1, 1978	103	90	+14.4%	0.79	130.4
Nakamun Park	Lac Ste. Anne County	January 1, 1966	78	96	−18.7%	0.43	181.4
Norglenwold	Red Deer County	January 1, 1965	306	273	+12.1%	0.62	493.5
Norris Beach	Wetaskiwin No. 10, County of	December 31, 1988	71	38	+86.8%	0.19	373.7
Parkland Beach	Ponoka County	January 1, 1984	168	153	+9.8%	0.94	178.7
Pelican Narrows	Bonnyville No. 87, M.D. of	July 1, 1979	158	151	+4.6%	0.74	213.5
Point Alison	Parkland County	December 31, 1950	18	10	+80.0%	0.19	94.7
Poplar Bay	Wetaskiwin No. 10, County of	January 1, 1967	113	103	+9.7%	0.71	159.2
Rochon Sands	Stettler No. 6, County of	May 17, 1929	97	86	+12.8%	2.03	47.8
Ross Haven	Lac Ste. Anne County	January 1, 1962	126	160	−21.3%	0.7	180.0
Sandy Beach	Lac Ste. Anne County	January 1, 1956	278	278	0.0%	2.41	115.4
Seba Beach	Parkland County	August 20, 1920	229	169	+35.5%	0.53	432.1
Silver Beach	Wetaskiwin No. 10, County of	December 31, 1953	55	65	−15.4%	0.61	90.2
Silver Sands	Lac Ste. Anne County	January 1, 1969	214	160	+33.7%	2.51	85.3
South Baptiste	Athabasca County	January 1, 1983	70	66	+6.1%	0.91	76.9
South View	Lac Ste. Anne County	January 1, 1970	72	67	+7.5%	0.44	163.6
Sunbreaker Cove	Lacombe County	December 31, 1990	131	81	+61.7%	0.47	278.7
Sundance Beach	Leduc County	January 1, 1970	42	73	−42.5%	0.43	97.7
Sunrise Beach	Lac Ste. Anne County	December 31, 1988	153	135	+13.3%	1.66	92.2
Sunset Beach	Athabasca County	May 1, 1977	55	49	+12.2%	0.87	63.2
Sunset Point	Lac Ste. Anne County	January 1, 1959	257	169	+52.1%	1.17	219.7
Val Quentin	Lac Ste. Anne County	January 1, 1966	158	252	−37.3%	0.29	544.8
Waiparous	Bighorn No. 8, M.D. of	January 1, 1986	57	49	+16.3%	0.41	139.0
West Baptiste	Athabasca County	January 1, 1983	46	38	+21.1%	0.54	85.2
West Cove	Lac Ste. Anne County	January 1, 1963	222	149	+49.0%	1.3	170.8
Whispering Hills	Athabasca County	January 1, 1983	128	142	−9.9%	1.64	78.0
White Sands	Stettler No. 6, County of	January 1, 1980	174	120	+45.0%	1.61	108.1
Yellowstone	Lac Ste. Anne County	January 1, 1965	117	137	−14.6%	0.28	417.9
Total summer villages	—	—	5,921	5,171	+14.5%	38.93	152.1

== Former summer villages ==
Four other communities in Alberta have previously held summer village status – Alberta Beach, Chestermere Lake (now Chestermere), Edmonton Beach (now Spring Lake), and White Gull.

Community	Incorporation date (summer village)	Status change date	Subsequent status
Alberta Beach	August 23, 1920	January 1, 1999	Village
Chestermere Lake	April 1, 1977	March 1, 1993	Town
Edmonton Beach	January 1, 1959	January 1, 1999	Village
White Gull	January 1, 1983	January 1, 2003	Unincorporated

== See also ==
- List of census divisions of Alberta
- List of cities in Alberta
- List of communities in Alberta
- List of hamlets in Alberta
- List of municipal districts in Alberta
- List of municipalities in Alberta
- List of resort villages in Saskatchewan
- List of towns in Alberta
- List of villages in Alberta
