= Wetaskiwin =

- City
- City of Wetaskiwin
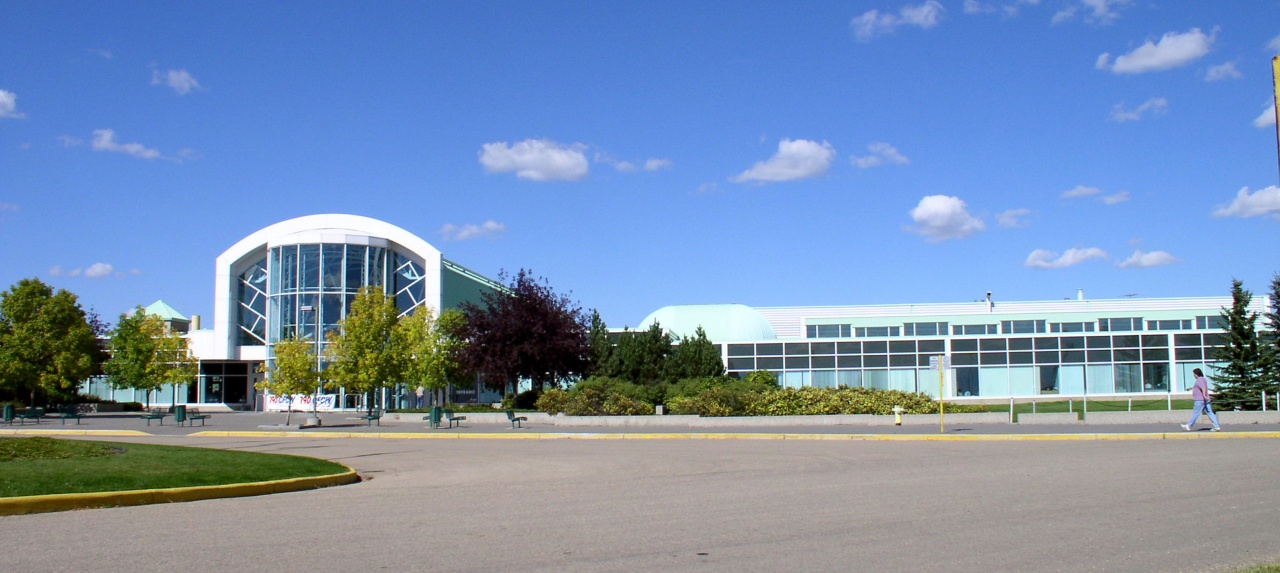
- Reynolds-Alberta Museum in Wetaskiwin

- Flag Coat of arms Logo
- Motto: "Pacem Volo Bellum Paro"
- City boundaries

- Location in Alberta Location in Canada Location in the County of Wetaskiwin
- Coordinates: 52°58′10″N 113°22′37″W
- Country: Canada
- Province: Alberta
- Planning region: North Saskatchewan
- Municipal district: County of Wetaskiwin No. 10
- Founded: 1892
- Incorporated
  - Village: December 4, 1899
  - Town: April 5, 1902
  - City: May 9, 1906

Government
  - Mayor: Joseph A. Branco
  - Governing body: Wetaskiwin City Council: Dean Billingsley; Mark Elder; Laura White; Deam Billingsley; Karen Aberle; Wayne Neilson
  - CAO: Sue Howard
  - MP: Mike Lake (CPC)
  - MLA: Rick Wilson

Area (2021)
  - Land: 18.75 km^{2} (7.24 sq mi)
- Elevation: 760 m (2,490 ft)

Population (2021)
  - Total: 12,594
  - Density: 671.6/km^{2} (1,739/sq mi)
  - Municipal census (2014): 12,621
  - Estimate (2020): 12,996
- Time zone: UTC−06:00 (Alberta Time)
- Forward sortation area: T9A
- Area codes: 780, 587, 825, 368
- Highways: Highway 2A; Highway 13
- Website: Official website

Wetaskiwin (/wəˈtæsk(ə)wɪn/ wə-TAS-k(ə-)win) is a city in the province of Alberta, Canada. The city is 70 kilometres (43 mi) south of the provincial capital of Edmonton. The city name comes from the Cree word wītaskiwinihk, meaning "the hills where peace was made".

Wetaskiwin is home to the Reynolds-Alberta Museum, a museum dedicated to celebrating "the spirit of the machine" as well as the Wetaskiwin and District Heritage Museum, which documents the pioneer arrival and lifestyle in Wetaskiwin's early years. Southeast of Wetaskiwin, the Alberta Central Railway Museum acknowledges the impact that the railway had on Central Alberta.

The city is well known in Western Canada for the slogan and jingle "Cars cost less in Wetaskiwin", from the Wetaskiwin Auto Dealers Association. Both have been in print, radio, and television advertisements since the mid-1970s.

== History ==
The future location of Wetaskiwin was once the site of a battle between the Cree and the Blackfoot, known as Wee-Tas-Ki-Win-Spatinow for "the place where peace was made". In 1890, when the Calgary and Edmonton Railway was built, it became a whistle-stop, and was known as Siding 16. In 1892, when the area was surveyed, it was named Wetaskiwin to commemorate the battle. Shortly after the survey, a group of Scandinavian immigrants settled at the townsite. A number of businesses were established, as well as a newspaper, the Free Lance.

In 1900, a Baptist church was organized. One year later, the village, with a population of more than 500, and was officially incorporated.

By 1908, Wetaskiwin had a town hall and several churches. The town's courthouse was built in 1909, and the water tower was built at about the same time.

After World War II, Wetaskiwin airport was founded; it later became the site of the Reynolds-Alberta Museum.

== Geography ==
Wetaskiwin sits on what was formerly the coast of the large sea that covered much of Alberta millions of years ago. The northwest end of Wetaskiwin is characterized by hills with sandy soil (formerly sand dunes), while the southeast end of the city is very flat with more silty soil.

The city lies at an elevation of 760 m (2,490 ft). Coal Lake, a reservoir developed on the Battle River is immediately east of the city, and other nearby waterways include Pipestone Creek, Bigstone Creek, Bittern Lake and Bearhills Lake.

Wetaskiwin is at the junction of Highway 2A, Highway 13 and the Canadian Pacific Kansas City railway. It was a stagecoach stop between Calgary and Edmonton.

=== Climate ===
Wetaskiwin has a humid continental climate (Köppen climate classification Dfb) with warm summers that retain cool nights, and cold winters. It falls into zone 3b under Plant hardiness zones.

Climate data for Wetaskiwin
Month	Jan	Feb	Mar	Apr	May	Jun	Jul	Aug	Sep	Oct	Nov	Dec	Year
Record high °C (°F)	11.5 (52.7)	15 (59)	25.0 (77.0)	28.5 (83.3)	34.0 (93.2)	34.5 (94.1)	36.0 (96.8)	35.5 (95.9)	32.5 (90.5)	29.5 (85.1)	18.5 (65.3)	16.0 (60.8)	36.0 (96.8)
Mean daily maximum °C (°F)	−5.2 (22.6)	−2.2 (28.0)	2.6 (36.7)	11.8 (53.2)	17.8 (64.0)	21.4 (70.5)	24.0 (75.2)	22.8 (73.0)	18.1 (64.6)	11.1 (52.0)	0.7 (33.3)	−2.7 (27.1)	10.0 (50.0)
Daily mean °C (°F)	−10.5 (13.1)	−7.9 (17.8)	−2.9 (26.8)	5.4 (41.7)	11.0 (51.8)	15.2 (59.4)	17.6 (63.7)	16.2 (61.2)	11.5 (52.7)	5.0 (41.0)	−4.2 (24.4)	−7.9 (17.8)	4.1 (39.4)
Mean daily minimum °C (°F)	−15.7 (3.7)	−13.6 (7.5)	−8.3 (17.1)	−1.1 (30.0)	4.2 (39.6)	9.0 (48.2)	11.2 (52.2)	9.6 (49.3)	4.7 (40.5)	−1.2 (29.8)	−9 (16)	−13.1 (8.4)	−2 (28)
Record low °C (°F)	−40 (−40)	−39.5 (−39.1)	−34 (−29)	−19.5 (−3.1)	−9.5 (14.9)	0.5 (32.9)	3.0 (37.4)	−2.5 (27.5)	−7 (19)	−22.5 (−8.5)	−33 (−27)	−37.5 (−35.5)	−40 (−40)
Average precipitation mm (inches)	27.9 (1.10)	18.4 (0.72)	26.7 (1.05)	30.7 (1.21)	51.2 (2.02)	79.4 (3.13)	92.3 (3.63)	60.7 (2.39)	41.7 (1.64)	24.8 (0.98)	25.0 (0.98)	18.7 (0.74)	497.2 (19.57)
Average rainfall mm (inches)	1.7 (0.07)	0.4 (0.02)	2.9 (0.11)	18.3 (0.72)	46.3 (1.82)	79.4 (3.13)	92.3 (3.63)	60.7 (2.39)	40.9 (1.61)	14.2 (0.56)	2.3 (0.09)	1.2 (0.05)	360.5 (14.19)
Average snowfall cm (inches)	26.2 (10.3)	18.0 (7.1)	23.7 (9.3)	12.4 (4.9)	4.9 (1.9)	0 (0)	0 (0)	0 (0)	0.8 (0.3)	10.6 (4.2)	22.8 (9.0)	17.5 (6.9)	136.8 (53.9)
Source: Environment Canada

== Demographics ==
Federal census population history
Year	Pop.	±%
1901	550	—
1906	1,652	+200.4%
1911	2,411	+45.9%
1916	2,048	−15.1%
1921	2,061	+0.6%
1926	1,884	−8.6%
1931	2,125	+12.8%
1936	2,058	−3.2%
1941	2,318	+12.6%
1946	2,645	+14.1%
1951	3,824	+44.6%
1956	4,476	+17.1%
1961	5,300	+18.4%
1966	6,008	+13.4%
1971	6,267	+4.3%
1976	6,754	+7.8%
1981	9,026	+33.6%
1986	10,071	+11.6%
1991	10,634	+5.6%
1996	10,959	+3.1%
2001	11,154	+1.8%
2006	11,673	+4.7%
2011	12,525	+7.3%
2016	12,655	+1.0%
2021	12,594	−0.5%
Source: Statistics Canada

In the 2021 Census of Population conducted by Statistics Canada, the City of Wetaskiwin had a population of 12,594 living in 5,186 of its 5,643 total private dwellings, a change of −0.5% from its 2016 population of 12,655. With a land area of 18.75 km^{2} (7.24 sq mi), it had a population density of 671.7/km^{2} (1,739.6/sq mi) in 2021.

In the 2016 Census of Population conducted by Statistics Canada, the City of Wetaskiwin had a population of 12,655 living in 5,121 of its 5,563 total private dwellings, a change of 1% from its 2011 population of 12,525. With a land area of 18.31 km^{2} (7.07 sq mi), it had a population density of 691.2/km^{2} (1,790.1/sq mi) in 2016.

The population of Wetaskiwin according to its 2014 municipal census is 12,621, a change of 2.7% from its 2009 municipal census population of 12,285.

=== Ethnicity ===
Almost 12% of the population identified as aboriginal at the time of the 2006 census.

Panethnic groups in the City of Wetaskiwin (2001−2021)
Panethnic group	2021		2016		2011		2006		2001	
Panethnic group	Pop.	%	Pop.	%	Pop.	%	Pop.	%	Pop.	%
European (Note: Statistic includes all persons that did not make up part of a visible minority or an indigenous identity.)	8,285	68.36%	9,075	74.32%	9,735	80.79%	9,380	83.19%	9,440	87.25%
Indigenous	2,185	18.03%	1,750	14.33%	1,330	11.04%	1,335	11.84%	920	8.5%
Southeast Asian (Note: Statistic includes total responses of "Filipino" and "Southeast Asian" under visible minority section on census.)	980	8.09%	665	5.45%	440	3.65%	200	1.77%	120	1.11%
South Asian	180	1.49%	180	1.47%	100	0.83%	110	0.98%	75	0.69%
African	135	1.11%	160	1.31%	135	1.12%	100	0.89%	60	0.55%
Middle Eastern (Note: Statistic includes total responses of "West Asian" and "Arab" under visible minority section on census.)	120	0.99%	140	1.15%	40	0.33%	20	0.18%	20	0.18%
East Asian (Note: Statistic includes total responses of "Chinese", "Korean", and "Japanese" under visible minority section on census.)	100	0.83%	125	1.02%	135	1.12%	95	0.84%	115	1.06%
Latin American	60	0.5%	80	0.66%	90	0.75%	20	0.18%	70	0.65%
Other/multiracial (Note: Statistic includes total responses of "Visible minority, n.i.e." and "Multiple visible minorities" under visible minority section on census.)	55	0.45%	40	0.33%	0	0%	45	0.4%	10	0.09%
Total responses	12,120	96.24%	12,210	96.48%	12,050	96.21%	11,275	96.59%	10,820	97.01%
Total population	12,594	100%	12,655	100%	12,525	100%	11,673	100%	11,154	100%
Note: Totals greater than 100% due to multiple origin responses

=== Language ===
Almost 90% of residents identified English as their first language. About 2.5% identified German, 1.5% French, 1.0% Cree, 0.9% Tagalog, 0.5% identified Chinese, and 0.4% each identified Swedish and Ukrainian as their first language learned.

=== Religion ===
About 75 percent of residents identified as Christian at the time of the 2001 census, while 24 percent indicated they had no religious affiliation. For specific denominations Statistics Canada found 20% identified as Roman Catholic, 15% identified with the United Church of Canada, more than 12% identified as Lutheran, 5% identified as Baptist, more than 4% identified as Anglican, and almost 2% identified as Pentecostal.

== Crime ==
In 2019, MacLean's Magazine ranked Wetaskiwin as the 4th most dangerous city in all of Canada.

Crime Severity Index in Wetaskiwin by Year
	2018	2019	2020	2021	2022	2023	2024
CSI	274.12	327.76	334.91	295.68	350.56	323.39	261.21
Violent CSI	245.44	330.34	412.55	306.42	431.19	328.87	269.35

== Features and attractions ==
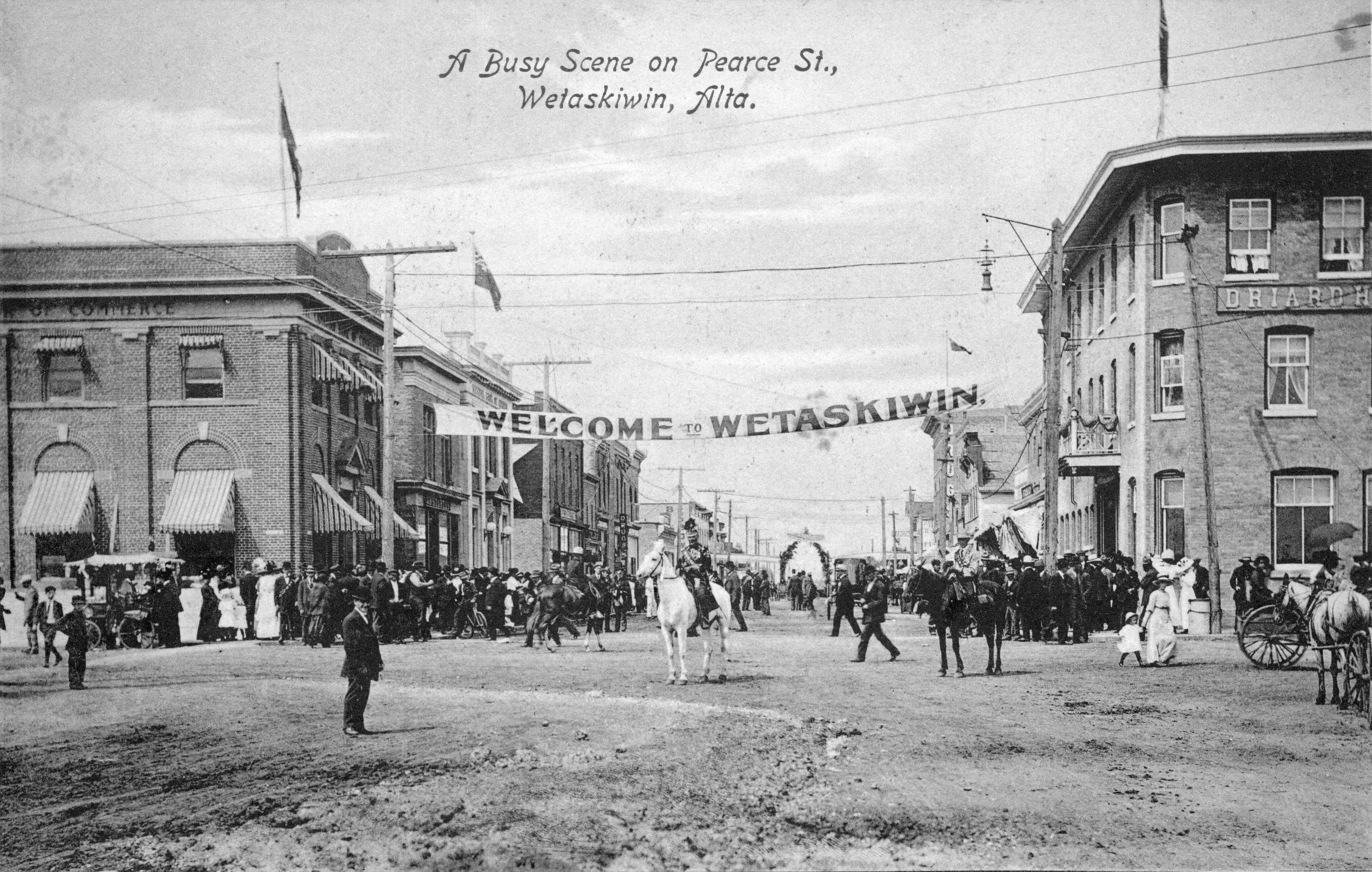
Wetaskiwin, circa 1910

=== Water tower ===
Built in 1909, Wetaskiwin's water tower is one of the oldest municipal water towers in Canada. The 42-metre-high structure has towered above Wetaskiwin since 1909 and holds 454,609 litres of water.

In 2004, Wetaskiwin City Council considered the possibility of demolishing the water tower, but concerned citizens convinced them the old tower was worth saving. Work to refurbish the tower began in 2005, and by 2006 the water tower was completely restored.

=== Peace cairn ===
The Wetaskiwin Peace Cairn commemorates 60 years of peace between the Blackfoot and Cree First Nations. This historic peace pact took place in a group of hills just north of present-day Wetaskiwin.

At the time of construction, school children each carried a rock and walked in a procession from their school to the hill where the cairn was to be erected.

The cairn was dedicated during the celebrations for Canada's Diamond Jubilee on 2 July 1927.

=== Manluk Centre ===
The Manluk Centre is a 44,756 square foot facility that opened on 13 September 2014. The facility has the Flaman Fitness Facility on its second floor. Built over a two-year period, the facility was funded by contributions from local businesses and individuals. Amenities include a 25-metre pool, a leisure pool, a lazy river, wave machine, slides, whirlpool, and a steam room.

=== City Hall ===
The current City Hall was originally built as a courthouse, and was completed in 1908 at a cost of $75,000. It was one of seven such buildings commissioned by the new Province of Alberta between 1906 and 1912, under the direction of Provincial Architect A. M. Jeffers.

The building was constructed in modern renaissance style, with the outside being composed entirely of red brick. The front steps, the back steps, the columns, and the keystones are constructed of stone, and the foundation is made of concrete and rubble sheathed with sandstone from the Calgary area.

In the early years, the basement of the courthouse contained the jail cells, the caretaker's residence, and the North-West Mounted Police residence. The cells are in their original state, and still contain the original carvings prisoners etched into the brick walls. The caretaker looked after the building and the grounds while his wife looked after the family, as well as feeding the prisoners and the members of the North-West Mounted Police housed there. In 1920, two German field cannons that were seized from Germany at the end of World War were placed on the front lawn of the Old Courthouse. These cannons, presented to the citizens of Wetaskiwin by the Dominion Government of Canada, served to honour the many men and women of this community who volunteered for active service.

In 1983, a new courthouse was built, and the old courthouse sat empty for more than two decades. In the late 1990s, a local developer approached the city with plans to renovate it as City Hall's new home; after several meetings between the parties involved, the old courthouse was purchased by the city and renovation began in 2005. Glass was used to frame the new areas of the building; the brick exterior of the Old Courthouse was left undisturbed. Aside from changes required by Alberta's building codes, the requirements set out by Alberta Historical Resources were followed during the restoration of the original courtroom, which now serves as Council Chambers. The wood panelling was retained, and the cast iron radiators were connected to the new geothermal heating and cooling system. New paint and carpet completed the renovations, and in 2007 the building became Wetaskiwin's new City Hall.

=== By-the-Lake Park ===
Wetaskiwin's By-the-Lake Park, near the Automile close to Wetaskiwin's downtown core, is a day-use facility featuring a 2.5-kilometre paved trail surrounding a 17-acre man-made lake and a large picnic area and a nature trail with signs identifying various plants and wildlife. The lake is stocked with fish for summer and winter fishing (Alberta Sport Fishing Regulations must be followed) and is used by school and community groups for canoeing and watersports. During the winter months the lake and surrounding area is used for cross-country skiing, ice skating, tobogganing, and pick-up games of pond-hockey.

== Politics ==
Historically the population of Wetaskiwin has voted Conservative in both provincial and federal politics. The city is currently represented in the House of Commons by MP Mike Lake of the Conservative Party.

== Infrastructure ==
The Wetaskiwin Regional Airport is within Wetaskiwin city limits.

== Media ==
Wetaskiwin is served by two local newspapers, the Pipestone Flyer and The Wetaskiwin Times.

Radio station CKJR is licensed to Wetaskiwin, but broadcasts from studios in Edmonton and carries a sports radio format generally targeting the region.

== Education ==
Wetaskiwin Regional Public Schools operates area public schools, including Wetaskiwin Composite High School. St. Thomas Aquinas Roman Catholic Schools, the area Catholic school system, operates the Sacred Heart School (grades K-9) in Wetaskiwin.

== Notable people ==
- Stan Reynolds, philanthropist
- Rod Buskas, former professional hockey player
- Jackson Davies, actor
- Val Fonteyne, former professional hockey player
- Paul Greene, actor
- Gus Marker, former professional hockey player
- Lori Radke, former Paralympic wheelchair basketball player
- Martin Sonnenberg, professional hockey player
- Allen York, professional hockey player
- Aritha van Herk, author, academic, critic, editor
- Justine Bouchard, gold medalist wrestler
- Harnarayan Singh, play-by-play announcer for the Punjabi edition of Hockey Night in Canada
