= Maskwacis-Wetaskiwin =

Provincial electoral district in Alberta, Canada

Alberta electoral district
- Maskwacis-Wetaskiwin within Alberta (2017 boundaries)

Provincial electoral district
- Legislature: Legislative Assembly of Alberta
MLA
Rick Wilson
United Conservative
- District created: 2017
- First contested: 2019
- Last contested: 2023

Demographics
- Population (2016): 43,798
- Area (km²): 4,220
- Pop. density (per km²): 10.4

Maskwacis-Wetaskiwin is a provincial electoral district in Alberta, Canada. The district is one of 87 districts mandated to return a single member (MLA) to the Legislative Assembly of Alberta using the first past the post method of voting. It was contested for the first time in the 2019 Alberta general election and is represented by Rick Wilson of the United Conservative Party of Alberta.

== Geography ==
The district is located south of Edmonton, named for the city of Wetaskiwin and the hamlet of Maskwacis (which serves as a central community for the "four nations": the Cree Ermineskin, Samson, Montana and Louis Bull bands). It also includes the Pigeon Lake Reserve, which is shared by the four nations. Other towns and villages include Millet, Bittern Lake, Hay Lakes, and the summer villages that line the shores of Pigeon Lake.

== History ==
Members of the Legislative Assembly for Maskwacis-Wetaskiwin
Assembly	Years	Member	Party
See Wetaskiwin-Camrose 1993–2019
30th	2019–2023	Rick Wilson	United Conservative
31st	2023–Present	Rick Wilson	United Conservative

The district was created in the 2017 electoral district re-distribution when most of Wetaskiwin-Camrose joined with parts of Battle River-Wainwright, Leduc-Beaumont, and Drayton Valley-Devon. The Commission decided to unite the five reserves around Maskwacis into a single riding to eliminate the province's last non-contiguous riding. The resulting population of the Maskwacis-Wetaskiwin electoral district for 2017 was 43,798, which was 6% below the provincial average of 46,803.

== Legislative election results ==
Redistributed results, 2015 Alberta general election
Party	Votes	%
New Democratic	6,795	41.51%
Progressive Conservative	4,760	29.08%
Wildrose	4,544	27.76%
Others	272	1.66%

=== 2019 ===
2019 Alberta general election
Party	Candidate	Votes	%	±%
United Conservative	Rick Wilson	12,796	64.12%	7.28%
New Democratic	Bruce Hinkley	4,737	23.74%	-17.77%
Alberta Party	Sherry Greene	1,382	6.93%	–
Freedom Conservative	David White	522	2.62%	–
Alberta Advantage Party	Wesley Rea	263	1.32%	–
Green	Desmond G. Bull	256	1.28%	–
Total		19,956	–	–
Rejected, spoiled and declined		90	–	–
Eligible electors / turnout		28,948	69.25%	–
United Conservative pickup new district.				
Source(s) Source: "74 - Maskwacis-Wetaskiwin, 2019 Alberta general election". officialresults.elections.ab.ca. Elections Alberta.

=== 2023 ===
2023 Alberta general election
Party	Candidate	Votes	%	±%
United Conservative	Rick Wilson	11,640	67.54	+3.42
New Democratic	Katherine Swampy	4,801	27.86	+4.12
Independent	Marie Rittenhouse	520	3.02	–
Green	Justin Fuss	187	1.09	-0.20
Solidarity Movement	Suzanne Jubb	86	0.50	–
Total		17,234	99.68	–
Rejected and declined		55	0.32	
Turnout		17,289	58.01	
Eligible voters		29,805		
United Conservative hold		Swing		-0.35
Source(s) Source: Elections Alberta

== See also ==
- List of Alberta provincial electoral districts
- Canadian provincial electoral districts
