= Montana 139 =

Indian reserve in Alberta

Coordinates: 52°44′03″N 113°26′23″W

- Indian reserve
- Montana Indian Reserve No. 139
- Location in Alberta
- First Nation: Montana
- Treaty: 6
- Country: Canada
- Province: Alberta
- Municipal district: Ponoka

Area
  - Total: 2,824.8 ha (6,980 acres)

Population (2016)
  - Total: 630
  - Density: 22/km^{2} (58/sq mi)
- Time zone: UTC−06:00 (Alberta Time)

Montana 139 is an Indian reserve of the Montana First Nation in Alberta, located within Ponoka County. Part of the Maskwacis community, it is 24 kilometres south of Wetaskiwin. In the 2016 Canadian Census, it recorded a population of 630 living in 137 of its 143 total private dwellings.

Besides Montana 139, the Montana First Nation also has access to Pigeon Lake 138A, a reserve shared by the four nations of Maskwacis. The other three are the Ermineskin First Nation, the Louis Bull First Nation and the Samson Cree Nation.
