= Henry Norwest =

Canadian soldier (1884–1918)

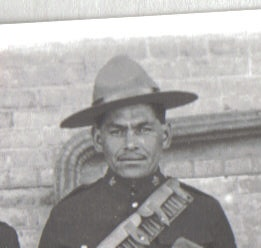
- Henry Norwest in 1915
- Born: 8 May 1884; Fort Saskatchewan, Alberta District, North-West Territories, Canada
- Died: 18 August 1918 (aged 37); Fouquescourt, Somme, France
- Military career
- Allegiance: Canada
- Branch: Canadian Expeditionary Force
- Service years: 1915–1918
- Rank: Lance corporal
- Nickname: Ducky
- Units: 50th Canadian Infantry Battalion
- Conflicts: First World War: Battle of Arras; Battle of Vimy Ridge; Hundred Days Offensive †; Battle of Amiens
- Awards: Military Medal & Bar

Henry Louis Norwest (sometimes spelled Northwest) MM & Bar (8 May 1884 – 18 August 1918) was a distinguished Canadian sniper in World War I.

== Early life ==
Norwest was born in Fort Saskatchewan, Alberta District, North-West Territories, sometime in the early 1880s, the son of Métis parents Louis Northwest or Watson and Geneviève Boucher. Norwest worked as a ranch hand and rodeo performer, then for a short time he served with the Royal North-West Mounted Police. In January 1915 he joined the Canadian Expeditionary Force (CEF).

== Military career ==
Henry Louis Norwest initially enlisted in Wetaskiwin as Henry Louie, listing his trade as "Cow Puncher". However, he was discharged just three months later for "drunkenness", according to official records. He then re-enlisted in Calgary, under the name of Henry Norwest. Around 4,000 First Nation men enlisted in the Canadian military, about 35% of male population in Canada. As a Métis Norwest was not included as Indians who lost their status, Métis and Inuit were not considered "Indian" at the time.

In his nearly three years of service with the 50th Canadian Infantry Battalion, the lance corporal achieved a documented sniping record of 115 fatal shots. His true number of kills could be higher, because the military only recorded hits which had been witnessed by someone else. Norwest drew greatly upon his upbringing and experience as a hunter – moving with stealth, and making use of camouflage and the natural foliage around him to hide. As a result of his exceptional abilities his superiors frequently sent him on reconnaissance missions into no man's land or behind enemy lines.

In 1917, Norwest earned the Military Medal during the Battle of Vimy Ridge, in recognition of his contribution to the conquering of a significant point along the ridge. In the three months preceding the battle, Norwest killed 59 enemy soldiers. After his death, he was posthumously awarded the bar to his Military Medal. He was one of only 838 men in the CEF to earn the Military Medal with Bar. Canadian Indigenous sniper Francis Pegahmagabow had a Military Medal and two bars one of only 39 Canadians to receive this honour. Only three months before the war ended, Norwest was on a mission to find a German sniper's lair when he was killed by the enemy sniper.

His Ross rifle is on display at The King's Own Calgary Regiment (RCAC) Museum, part of The Military Museums in Calgary. It is the second of three rifles that he used and was brought back to Canada by his spotter. The last rifle that Norwest carried was rumoured to have been taken by the German sniper who killed him on 18 August 1918 near Fouquescourt, Somme, France.

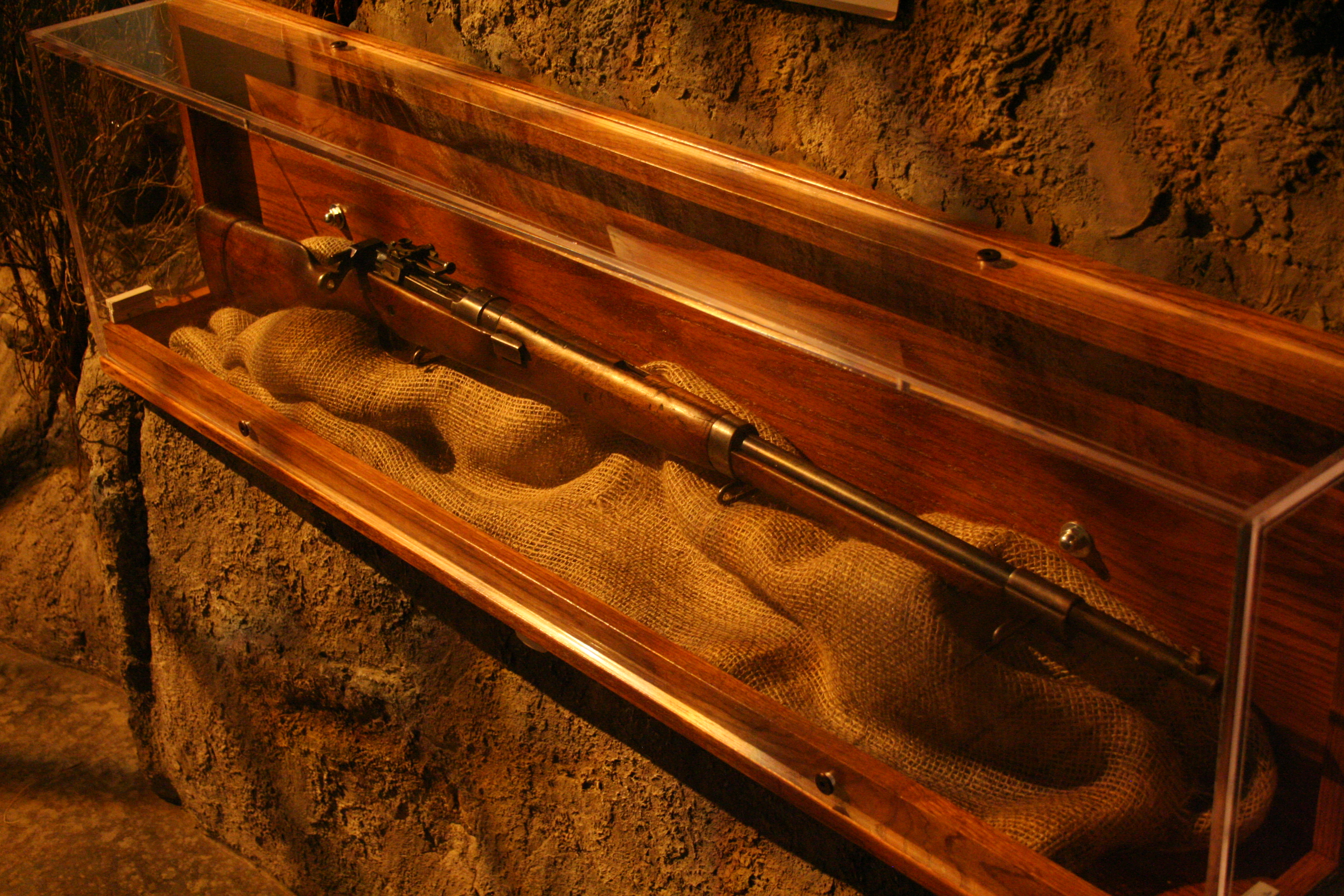
Norwest's rifle on display at The Military Museums in Calgary.

== Personal life ==
Nicknamed Ducky, Henry Norwest was Métis of Cree/French origins from the Hobbema reserve in Alberta. Henry reportedly earned his nickname during the war because he was very popular with women at dance halls, and would dance for hours before "ducking" out on the women at the end of the night. April 9 marks 100 years since Canadian troops began the battle for Vimy Ridge. Henry was married with three children, who were all sent to a residential school in Ermineskin, Alberta, prior to his enlistment. His wife died in Alberta sometime before he was killed in action. His three daughters became orphans upon his death, and spent most of their childhoods in a residential school. Henry is buried in the Warvillers Churchyard Extension Cemetery, Warvillers, Somme, France.

== Legacy ==
Fort Saskatchewan's cemetery features two large stones that each bear a plaque detailing his accomplishments during the war. His name was added to the community's cenotaph in 2008. The local branch of the Royal Canadian Legion hung his portrait in their canteen, named it in his honour, and placed an eagle feather, a sacred symbol in Cree culture, in glass beside his picture. It is estimated that Norwest has hundreds of descendants, mostly concentrated around Samson Cree First Nation in central Alberta.

== Bibliography ==
Notes

References

- Dempsey, James (2003). "Biography – NORWEST, HENRY – Volume XIV (1911–1920)". University of Toronto/Université Laval.
- Library and Archives Canada (2024). "Henry Norwest Attestation Paper". Government of Canada.
- The National Archives, UK (20 September 2017). "Indigenous Canadian soldiers in the First World War". Government of the United Kingdom.
- Stewart, Briar (April 4, 2017). "Métis sniper made his mark for Canada at Vimy Ridge". CBC News.
- Veterans Affairs Canada (2019-02-14). "Sharpshooter: Henry Louis Norwest". Government of Canada.
