= Danika Littlechild =

Danika Billie Rose Littlechild of the Ermineskin Cree Nation, was born and raised in Maskwacis, Alberta, Canada. She served as the vice president of the Canadian Commission for UNESCO in 2014. She is a lawyer and activist for cultural diversity and recognition of Indigenous rights.

== Early life ==
=== Background and family history ===
Danika Littlechild was born into the Ermineskin Cree Nation which is part of the Alberta Maskwacis district. The Ermineskin reserve was established in 1895; they have their own police, firehall, ambulance services, schools, and businesses. Her ancestors were an Ermineskin Cree Nation "spearheading family". Littlechild's father, Wilton Littlechild, was also a Cree Lawyer. In addition, he was the Chief of the Confederacy of Treaty Six First Nations, now former but the first ever Indigenous Member of Parliament of Alberta, as well as a residential school survivor.

=== Education ===
Littlechild attended elementary and high school in the Ermineskin community, which are highly technologically advanced with iMacs and internet. She later completed an Undergraduate degree in political science from Carleton University. She completed a law degree from the University of Toronto, and a Masters of Law at the University of Victoria. She received a Fellowship in Comparative and Federal Indigenous Peoples Law from the University of Oklahoma College of Law.

== Career ==
=== Lawyer ===
Littlechild has been practicing law since 2004, and specializes in Indigenous law, international law, and environmental law. She served as the legal consultant for the Alberta First Nation Council, specifically regarding water and sanitation. In 2016, she was on the consulting legal council with the International Indian Treaty Council, is currently, an active member of the Canadian Coalition of Municipalities Against Racism and the United Nations Committee on the Elimination of Racial Discrimination. She has done volunteer work as the council for an Aboriginal women's shelter, a First Nations youth drug and alcohol treatment centre, a First Nations child welfare authority, an education authority, a First Nations Health Authority and an employment centre. She is also certified in conflict prevention and peacebuilding of Indigenous representatives, and she has been the Indigenous representative in countless UN treaty bodies.

=== Vice president of CCUNESCO ===
Littlechild was elected the first Indigenous Vice President of the Canadian Commission for UNESCO in 2014. She had been working with UNESCO for two decades, since 1995, and she was one of the only youth employees at the time. Now, there are over 300 youth employees in total. Prior to her vice presidency, she served as the vice-chair, then chair of the sectoral commission for cultural communication and information.

During her time as vice president, she focused on youth involvement initiatives that were directed towards ending discrimination and promoting freedom of expression. Littlechild created a youth poetry competition in which students presented their poems in their native languages. Other initiatives include the Winnipeg cultural diversity project, the Raise Hands Against Racism campaign for the international elimination of discrimination day, and Protecting the Sacred: Recognition of Sacred Sites of Indigenous Peoples for Sustaining Nature and Culture in Northern and Arctic Regions conference, which all promote diversity. She also created a Panel discussion for promoting the freedom of expression; The Freedom of Expression in Broad Strokes international exhibition in Zimbabwe, 60 Seconds of Radio for Youth, and UNESCO Colours for the Planet art camp.

=== Awards ===
In 2015, Littlechild was the recipient of an Esquao Award which recognizes the accomplishments of indigenous women. In the same year, she was the recipient of the Alberta Aboriginal Role Models Award for Justice.
