= Canadian Indigenous Languages and Literacy Development Institute =

Initiative

Canadian Indigenous Languages and Literacy Institute
- Founders: Heather Blair; Donna Paskemin; Sally Rice; Priscilla Settee; Edie Hyggenat
- Established: 1999
- Mission: Indigenous language revitalization in Western Canada
- Focus: "linguistics, endangered indigenous language documentation and revitalization, language and literacy learning, second language teaching and curriculum development, and language policy and planning"
- Key people: Advisory council Donna Paskemin; Heather Blair; Sally Rice; Mary Cardinal Collins; Priscilla Settee, Edie Hyggenat; Brenda Ahenakew; Dolores Sand; Sam Robinson
- Location: Edmonton, Canada
- Website: http://www.cilldi.ualberta.ca

Canadian Indigenous Languages and Literacy Development Institute (CILLDI) - an intensive annual "summer school for Indigenous language activists, speakers, linguists, and teachers" - hosted at the University of Alberta, Edmonton - is a "multicultural, cross-linguistic, interdisciplinary, inter-regional, inter-generational" initiative. CILLDI was established in 1999 with one Cree language course offered by Cree speaker Donna Paskemin. By 2016 over 600 CILLDI students representing nearly 30 Canadian Indigenous languages had participated in the program and it had become the "most national (and international) of similar language revitalization programs in Canada aimed at the promotion of First Peoples languages." CILLDI - a joint venture between the University of Alberta and the University of Saskatchewan - responds to "different sociolinguistic situations in language communities under threat" and includes three faculties at the University of Alberta in Edmonton - Arts, Education, and Native Studies. CILLDI provides practical training to students which is "directly implemented back in the community." Initiatives like CILLDI were formed against the backdrop of a projection of a catastrophic and rapid decline of languages in the twenty-first century.

== Context ==
There are more than 60 Aboriginal languages in Canada. With the exception of Cree, Ojibway and Inuktitut, all Canadian Indigenous languages are endangered, many critically so. Indigenous communities, colleges and universities are working to preserve — and in some cases, restore — these languages, but so far there has been no national initiative dedicated to Indigenous language sustainability in Canada.

— Sally Rice, 2016, ANVILS, University of Alberta

In both Saskatchewan and Manitoba there was an interest in "Indigenous language and bilingual program development" in the mid-1970s. The 1996 Royal Commission on Aboriginal People report drew widespread attention to the plight of Canada’s Indigenous languages. The World Indigenous Peoples Conference-Education (WIPCE) was held in 1999.

According to the 2006 Canadian census "only 12.4% of Indigenous children aged 0-4 [were] learning an Indigenous language at home; another 5% [were] acquiring one as an additional language." By 2007 "The forecast for preserving and revitalizing Canada’s Indigenous languages was gloomy.

== History ==
CILLDI was established in 1999 by a collective of language advocates and educators including Donna Paskemin, Heather Blair, and Sally Rice; the first CILLDI summer institute was held on the Onion Lake First Nation, Saskatchewan and offered one course entitled "Expanding Cree Language and Literacy" with fifteen students from Alberta and Saskatchewan. in July 2000. CILLDE, an "indigenous educator training institute" was modeled after its American counterpart - the American Indian Language Development Institute (AILDI) - which itself was co-founded by language activist, Lucille Watahomigie and Leanne Hinton and is now based at the University of Arizona in Tucson. Freda Ahenakew, CM SOM (1932 – 2011) a Cree linguist and recipient of the Order of Canada of Cree descent was the honoured guest. Ahenakew's work and that of Dr. Verna Kirkness, a Cree scholar and language advocate, is acknowledged as catalytic in the formation of CILLDI. Donna Paskemin – who had worked in 1981 at the Saskatchewan Indian Languages Institute (SILI) under the direction of Dr Freda Ahenakew – was the instructor for the Cree immersion course.

According to Arden Ogg of the Cree Literacy Network, Donna Paskewin,

... was the driving force behind the inception of the Canadian Indigenous Language and Literacy Development Institute (CILLDI) in 2000 at the University of Alberta and helped guide its development as a language planner, instructor, curriculum developer, immersion teacher, and fundraiser, always consulting the Elders and following appropriate protocols. I believe that we would never have gotten the Institute off the ground had it not been for Donna’s insistence on its importance and the urgent need. Donna’s work has been the foundation of the language retention and revitalization efforts of the over 800 CILLDI students since 2000.

— Arden Ogg "In Tribute" 2011

When Donna's young daughter Jodee Jayne attended CILLDI one summer, as the youngest attendee, Donna was motivated to organize a Cree Immersion Day camp in 2004 at CILLDI for the children of our adult students so that the language would be learned by the next generations. Jodee attended the Young Women’s Circle of Leadership at CILLDI in 2009.

In July 2001 the summer school was held in St. Paul, Alberta with thirty-eight students including Cree, Dene Suline, Michif, and North Slavey speakers from Alberta, Saskatchewan, and the Northwest Territories. Cree courses were taught by Donna Paskemin (1961-2011) with Dolores Sand; Dene was taught by Valerie Wood and Marge Reynolds; Linguistics by University of Alberta Linguistics professor, Sally A. Rice with Brenda Ahenakew; and Planning for Indigenous Language and Literacy Development by University of Alberta Education professor, Heather Blair.

In 2003 the Northern Teacher Education Program (NORTEP) hosted the program in La Ronge, Saskatchewan. By 2003 more classes were being offered and the summer school moved permanently to its new home on the University of Alberta campus.

The Northern Teacher Education Program (NORTEP) which was initiated in 1976 by the Northern Lights School Division "to facilitate access to teacher education and certification for northerners, particularly those of Aboriginal ancestry. At the time, there was less than 1% of Aboriginal Teachers in the north and the teacher turn-over rate was very high."

Donna Paskemin, Heather Blair, Sally Rice, Mary Cardinal Collins, Priscilla Settee, Edie Hyggenat, Brenda Ahenakew, Dolores Sand and Sam Robinson were on the CILLDI Advisory Council.

== Students and teachers ==
CILLDI students mainly come from the British Columbia, Alberta, Saskatchewan, Manitoba, the Yukon and Nunavut. Faculty, teaching assistants, and supporters include endangered language activists from across North America. This includes Alberta Ministries of Education, Advanced Education, and Community Development, University of Arizona (AILDI), Aurora College, Blue Quills First Nations Tribal College, Buffalo Nations Museum, University of Calgary, First Nations University College of Canada (University of Regina), University of Hawaiʻi, Keyano College, Maskwachees Cultural College, Metis Nation of Alberta, University of Montana, University of New Mexico, Northern Lights School Division, Red Crow Community College, University of Saskatchewan, Sealaska Heritage Center and Yellowhead Tribal College.

Instructors at these institutes are "educators, researchers and Aboriginal language speakers drawn from the teaching and administrative staff of school districts and from university faculties across North America."

== Programs ==
Every summer CILLDI offers courses with university credits about Indigenous language and culture. CILLDI focuses on teaching Indigenous language teachers through indigenous language revitalization in Western Canada. Courses include content on "linguistics, endangered indigenous language documentation and revitalization, language and literacy learning, second language teaching and curriculum development, and language policy and planning." CILLDE also maintains an online catalogue of their "books, reports, journals, and learning materials."

=== Community Linguist Certificate (CLC) ===
Some CILLDI courses lead to a Community Linguist Certificate (CLC). This program provides a unique opportunity to earn university credit while learning about Indigenous languages and culture. CIILDI provides "background training in a variety of disciplines to students who may be seeking a B.A. or a B.Ed. or other advanced degree, diploma, or certificate." Through CILLDI the accredited Community Linguist Certificate (CLC) program was developed in 2007 by Sally Rice - "Professor of Linguistics at the University of Alberta and a co-founder and former director of CILLDI" - By 2016 over 90 Indigenous language speakers in Canada had earned their CLC. CLC students are often "fluent speakers who may also be veteran language teachers with years of experience in the classroom but very little formal training" or "young professionals recently tasked with developing language revitalization programming in their home communities." They may lack an understanding of the "lexical and grammatical patterns of one's language, as well as the ways in which those patterns can be meaningfully and systematically manipulated in context."

According to Sally Rice, CILLDI co-founder and CLC co-developer,

In developing the program, we assumed that the holder of the Community Linguist Certificate would likely be called upon by his or her community to lead any local language documentation, maintenance or revitalization efforts. In addition to the expected work of dictionary, grammar and text production, certificate recipients would probably be tasked with projects such as refining orthographic systems and promoting them to speakers, recording Elders and transcribing their stories, serving as an interpreter, digitizing oral texts, conducting language use surveys, developing planning and policy documents, writing language-based grant proposals, promoting public awareness, working with local Elders and teachers to develop language curriculum materials, offering language classes for adult learners, producing a community newsletter in the Aboriginal language, running language and culture camps and assisting the band administration in implementing language policy in communities and schools.

— Sally Rice cited in Flynn 2016

[S]peaking a language is like driving a car, while doing linguistic analysis is like servicing it: we have to take the language off the road, so to speak, put it up on blocks, see how all the component parts work together and, if need be, take them apart. However, we can and do put the analytical units back together ....

— Sally Rice cited in Flynn 2016

The Tsúùt’ìnà Gunaha ('Tsúùt’ìnà Language') Project - a joint initiative between the Tsuu T'ina Nation near Calgary, Alberta, and the Department of Linguistics at the University of Alberta - delivers the CLC program on the reserve. Stephen Crowchild, the current director of the Tsuut'ina Gunaha Institute - their language revitalization program - is a former student of CILLDI.

=== A National Vision for Indigenous Language Stability (ANVILS) ===
A National Vision for Indigenous Language Stability (ANVILS) is a workshop held during CILLDI's intense summer school program at the University of Alberta. ANVIL brings together "Indigenous leaders, national and international scholars and representatives from the government to begin a national conversation about Indigenous language sustainability and preservation."

== Role ==
Canadian researchers compiling a 2007 literature review of Canadian and international indigenous language learning and teaching, noted that literature published on "linguistic language theoretical and practical findings" - was more easily available to public educational institutions or libraries; but the invaluable pedagogical language strategies significant body of "pedagogical linguistic language materials" developed within First Nations communities" were known to representatives from institutes like CILLDI who worked closely with communities.
