= List of tribal colleges and universities =

This is a list of tribal colleges and universities by country. Some universities or colleges historically have served a largely indigenous population without being associated with any tribe; such institutions are not part of this list.

== Australia ==
- Batchelor Institute of Indigenous Tertiary Education

== Bolivia ==
- UNIBOL Casimiro Huanca (Quechua) es:Universidad Indígena Quechua Casimiro Huanca
- UNIBOL Túpak Katari (Aymara)
- UNIBOL Apiaguaiki Tüpa (Guaraní) es:Universidad Indígena Guaraní Apiaguaiki Tupa

== Brazil ==
- Indigenous Federal University (Unind)

== Canada ==
=== Alberta ===
- Maskwacis Cultural College
- Old Sun Community College, Siksika 146
- Red Crow Community College, Cardston
- University nuhelot’įne thaiyots’į nistameyimâkanak Blue Quills, St. Paul
- Yellowhead Tribal College, Edmonton

=== British Columbia ===
- Native Education College, Vancouver
- Nicola Valley Institute of Technology, Merritt

=== Manitoba ===
- University College of the North, The Pas
- Yellowquill College, Winnipeg

=== Nunavut ===
- Akitsiraq Law School
- Nunavut Arctic College

=== Ontario ===
- Anishinabek Educational Institute, North Bay
- First Nations Technical Institute, Tyendinaga Mohawk Territory
- Kenjgewin Teg, M'Chigeeng First Nation
- Negahneewin College, Thunder Bay
- Ogwehoweh Skills and Trades Training Centre
- Oshki-Pimache-O-Win Education & Training Institute
- Seven Generations Education Institute
- Shingwauk Kinoomaage Gamig
- Six Nations Polytechnic, Ohsweken

=== Saskatchewan ===
- First Nations University of Canada
- Gabriel Dumont Institute
- Saskatchewan Indian Institute of Technologies, Saskatoon

=== Quebec ===
- Iohahi:io Akwesasne Education & Training Institute
- Nunavik Sivunitsavut, Montreal
- Kiuna Institute, Odanak

== Colombia ==
- Universidad Autónoma Indígena Intercultural
- Misak University (Universidad Misak)

== Ecuador ==
- Universidad Amawtay Wasi

== Guatemala ==
- Universidad Maya Kaqchikel
- The Intercultural Programs of USAC

== Guyana ==
- Maoka Taawa University of the Forests

== Honduras ==
- Universidad Indígenка y de los Pueblos — UIP

== India ==
- Indira Gandhi National Tribal University
- Central Tribal University of Andhra Pradesh
- Sammakka Sarakka Central Tribal University
- Kalinga Institute of Social Sciences

== Malaysia ==
- Universiti Teknologi MARA
- MARA Junior Science College

== México ==
- Universidad Intercultural del Estado de México (UIEM)
- Universidad Autónoma Indígenка de México (UAIM)
- Universidad Intercultural Maya de Quintana Roo (UIMQROO)
- Universidad del Pueblo Yaqui
- Universidad Intercultural de Chiapas
- UIET | Universidad Intercultural del Estado de Tabasco
- Universidad Intercultural del Estado de Puebla UIEP
- Universidad Intercultural Indígena de Michoacán UIIM .
- La Unidad de Inteligencia Económica Global (UIEG)
- Universidad Intercultural de San Luis Potosí UICSLP
- Universidad Intercultural del Estado de Hidalgo UICEH
- Universidad Intercultural de Baja California UIBC
- Universidad Intercultural de Campeche UICAM
- Universidad Intercultural de Guerrero (UIG)
- Universidad Intercultural de Tlaxcala

== New Zealand ==
=== Bay of Plenty ===
- Te Whare Wānanga o Awanuiārangi, Whakatāne

=== Waikato ===
- Te Wānanga o Aotearoa, Te Awamutu

=== Wellington ===
- Te Wānanga o Raukawa, Ōtaki

== Nicaragua ==
- URACCAN (Universidad de las Regiones Autónomas de la Costa Caribe Nicaragüense)
- BICU (Bluefields Indian & Caribbean University)

== Norway ==
- Sámi University of Applied Sciences

== Panama ==
- Universidad Autónoma de los Pueblos Indígenas

== Peru ==
- UNIA es:Universidad Nacional Intercultural de la Amazonía
- UNISCJSA (Universidad Nacional Intercultural de la Selva Central Juan Santos Atahualpa)
- UNIQ (Universidad Nacional Intercultural de Quillabamba)
- UNIBAGUA (Universidad Nacional Intercultural Fabiola Salazar Leguía de Bagua)

== The Philippines ==
=== Davao ===
- Pamulaan Center for Indigenous Peoples

== Russia ==
=== Saint Petersburg ===
- Institute of the Peoples of the North

=== Sakha Republic ===
- Arctic College of Technology and Design
- Arctic College of the Peoples of the North
- Arctic State Institute of Culture and Art
- Arctic State Agricultural Technological University
- Ammosov North-Eastern Federal University
- Yakutsk College of Culture and Art
- Yakutsk Music College

== Taiwan ==
- College of Indigenous Studies

== United States ==
=== Alaska ===
- Iḷisaġvik College, Utqiaġvik

=== Arizona ===
- Coconino Community College, Flagstaff (Native American-Serving Nontribal Institution)
- Diné College, Tsaile
- Northland Pioneer College, Show Low (Native American-Serving Nontribal Institution)
- San Carlos Apache College, San Carlos
- Tohono Oʼodham Community College, Sells

=== California ===
- California Indian Nations College, Palm Desert
- California Tribal College, Woodland

=== Kansas ===
- Haskell Indian Nations University, Lawrence

=== Michigan ===
- Bay Mills Community College, Brimley
- Keweenaw Bay Ojibwa Community College, Baraga
- Saginaw Chippewa Tribal College, Mount Pleasant

=== Minnesota ===
- Fond du Lac Tribal and Community College, Cloquet
- Leech Lake Tribal College, Cass Lake
- Red Lake Nation College, Red Lake
- White Earth Tribal and Community College, Mahnomen
- University of Minnesota Morris, Morris (Native American-Serving Nontribal Institution)

=== Montana ===
- Aaniiih Nakoda College, Harlem
- Blackfeet Community College, Browning
- Chief Dull Knife College, Lame Deer
- Fort Peck Community College, Poplar
- Little Big Horn College, Crow Agency
- Montana State University–Northern, Havre (Native American-Serving Nontribal Institution)
- Salish Kootenai College, Pablo
- Stone Child College, Box Elder

=== Nebraska ===
- Little Priest Tribal College, Winnebago
- Nebraska Indian Community College, Macy

=== New Mexico ===
- Eastern New Mexico University, Ruidoso (Native American-Serving Nontribal Institution)
- Institute of American Indian Arts, Santa Fe
- Navajo Technical University, Crownpoint
- Northern New Mexico College, Española (Native American-Serving Nontribal Institution)
- San Juan College, Farmington (Native American-Serving Nontribal Institution)
- Southwestern Indian Polytechnic Institute, Albuquerque

=== North Carolina ===
- Bladen Community College, Dublin (Native American-Serving Nontribal Institution)
- University of North Carolina at Pembroke, Pembroke (Native American-Serving Nontribal Institution)

=== North Dakota ===
- Cankdeska Cikana Community College, Fort Totten
- Nueta Hidatsa Sahnish College, New Town
- Sitting Bull College, Fort Yates
- Turtle Mountain College, Belcourt
- United Tribes Technical College, Bismarck

=== Oklahoma ===
- University of Science and Arts of Oklahoma, Chickasha (Native American-Serving Nontribal Institution)
- Carl Albert State College, Poteau (Native American-Serving Nontribal Institution)
- College of the Muscogee Nation, Okmulgee
- Connors State College, Warner (Native American-Serving Nontribal Institution)
- East Central University, Ada (Native American-Serving Nontribal Institution)
- Northeastern Oklahoma A&M College, Miami (Native American-Serving Nontribal Institution)
- Northeastern State University, Tahlequah (Native American-Serving Nontribal Institution)
- Northern Oklahoma College, Tonkawa (Native American-Serving Nontribal Institution)
- Oklahoma State University Institute of Technology, Okmulgee (Native American-Serving Nontribal Institution)
- Pawnee Nation College, Pawnee (Not Accredited)
- Redlands Community College, El Reno (Native American-Serving Nontribal Institution)
- Rogers State University, Claremore (Native American-Serving Nontribal Institution)
- Seminole State College, Seminole (Native American-Serving Nontribal Institution)
- Southeastern Oklahoma State University, Durant (Native American-Serving Nontribal Institution)

=== South Dakota ===
- Oglala Lakota College, Kyle
- Sinte Gleska University, Mission
- Sisseton Wahpeton College, Sisseton

=== Washington ===
- Northwest Indian College, Bellingham

=== Wisconsin ===
- College of Menominee Nation, Keshena
- Lac Courte Oreilles Ojibwe University, Hayward

=== Wyoming ===
- Wind River Tribal College, Ethete

== Venezuela ==
- Universidad Indígena de Venezuela (Universidad Nacional Experimental Indígena del Tauca (UNEIT))
