= War Party =

War Party may refer to:

- War Party (1988 film), 1988 film starring Billy Wirth and Kevin Dillon
- War Party (1965 film), a 1965 American Western film
- War Party (album), 2004 album by the heavy metal band Gwar
- War Party Tour 2004, a 2004 DVD live show by Gwar
- War Party (band), a Cree hip hop band in Canada
- "War Party", a song by Eddy Grant from Killer on the Rampage
- "War Party", a song by Mac from World War III
