= Enoch Cree Nation 135A =

Coordinates: 53°43′58″N 114°25′15″W

- Indian reserve
- Location in Alberta
- First Nation: Enoch
- Treaty: 6
- Country: Canada
- Province: Alberta
- Municipal district: Lac Ste. Anne

Area
  - Total: 2.0 ha (4.9 acres)
- Time zone: UTC−06:00 (Alberta Time)

Enoch Cree Nation 135A is a small, uninhabited Indian reserve of the Enoch Cree Nation in Alberta, located within Lac Ste. Anne County. It is 43 kilometres south of Barrhead.
