= Old Sun Community College =

First Nation-operated community college in Alberta

- NA TO SA PI (Old Sun "to see", as in "gain insight")
- Motto: empowering a nation through education
- Type: Tribal College
- President: Maria Big Snake
- Location: P.O. Box 1250, Siksika T0J 3W0, Alberta; 50.8482°N 113.0605°W
- Campus: urban/suburban reserve
- Website: Official site

Old Sun Community College is a community college owned and operated by First Nations that provides post-secondary education and training in Siksika 146, Alberta, Canada, to members of the Siksika Nation.

== Partnerships ==
Old Sun Community College is a member of the First Nation & Adult Higher Education Consortium, a non-profit organization in Western Canada, which coordinates the efforts of its members to provide quality adult and higher education, controlled entirely by people of the First Nations.

== History ==
The main campus building was used as a Residential School for Blackfoot children from 1929-1971. From 1971–1976, the College was operated as a campus of Mount Royal College. In 1978, Old Sun Community College became an independent institution operated by the Blackfoot Band. The College was named in honour of Chief Old Sun (1819–1897) who served as a medicine man, warrior, and leader of one of the largest of the Blackfoot Confederacy bands. In Blackfoot, Chief Old Sun’s name NA TO SA PI translates to ‘Sun Elder’ or ‘Sun Old Man’ which implies ‘to see’, or 'to gain insight'.

Since the 1980s, Old Sun Education has evolved from a small upgrading program into Old Sun Community College, a centre offering accredited post-secondary courses, certificates, diplomas and degrees via partnerships with recognized colleges and universities, in particular the University of Calgary and Bow Valley College.

== Academics ==
Students are instructed by Professors from affiliated Universities and Colleges. Some of the academic programs offered at Old Sun Community College are as follows:

- Adult Basic Education (ABE)
- Academic Upgrading
- Bachelor of General Studies
- Blackfoot language classes,
- Bow Valley College LPN Diploma Program
- University & College Preparation (UCEPP)
- University outreach program,
- University of Calgary outreach program
- University Studies Diploma (USD)
- Master of Education Degree
- Off Campus Student Support
- Prior Learning Assessment & Recognition (PLAR) Program
- Summer programs

=== Scholarships and bursaries ===
The Government of Canada sponsors an Aboriginal Bursaries Search Tool that lists over 680 scholarships, bursaries, and other incentives offered by governments, universities, and industry to support Aboriginal post-secondary participation.

== See also ==
- List of tribal colleges and universities
