= Enoch Cree Nation =

Canadian First Nation

Coordinates: 53°28′59″N 113°45′6″W

- Band No. 440
- ᒪᐢᑫᑯᓯᐦᐠ; maskêkosihk

- Location in Alberta
- People: Cree
- Treaty: Treaty 6
- Headquarters: Enoch
- Province: Alberta

Land
- Main reserve: Enoch Cree Nation 135
- Reserve: Enoch Cree Nation 135A
- Land area: 53.082 km^{2} (20.495 sq mi)

Population (October 2019)
- On reserve: 1794
- On other land: 43
- Off reserve: 951
- Total population: 2788

Government
- Chief: Cody Thomas
- Council: Kyle Peacock; Jared Morin; Ronald Morin Sr.; Lyle (Geejoe) Morin; Shane Peacock; Councilman Jerome (Rocky) Morin Jr.; Charlton Thomas; Nola Wanuch; Leigh Ann Ward; John Thomas Jr.

Website
- enochnation.ca

The Enoch Cree Nation No. 440 (Cree: ᒪᐢᑫᑯᓯᐦᐠ, maskêkosihk) is a First Nations band government in Alberta, Canada. Members of the Nation are of Cree ancestry and speak the Plains Cree dialect of the Cree language group. The band is a signatory of Treaty 6 and is a member of the Confederacy of Treaty Six First Nations. The chief of the Enoch Cree Nation is Cody Thomas.

== Location ==
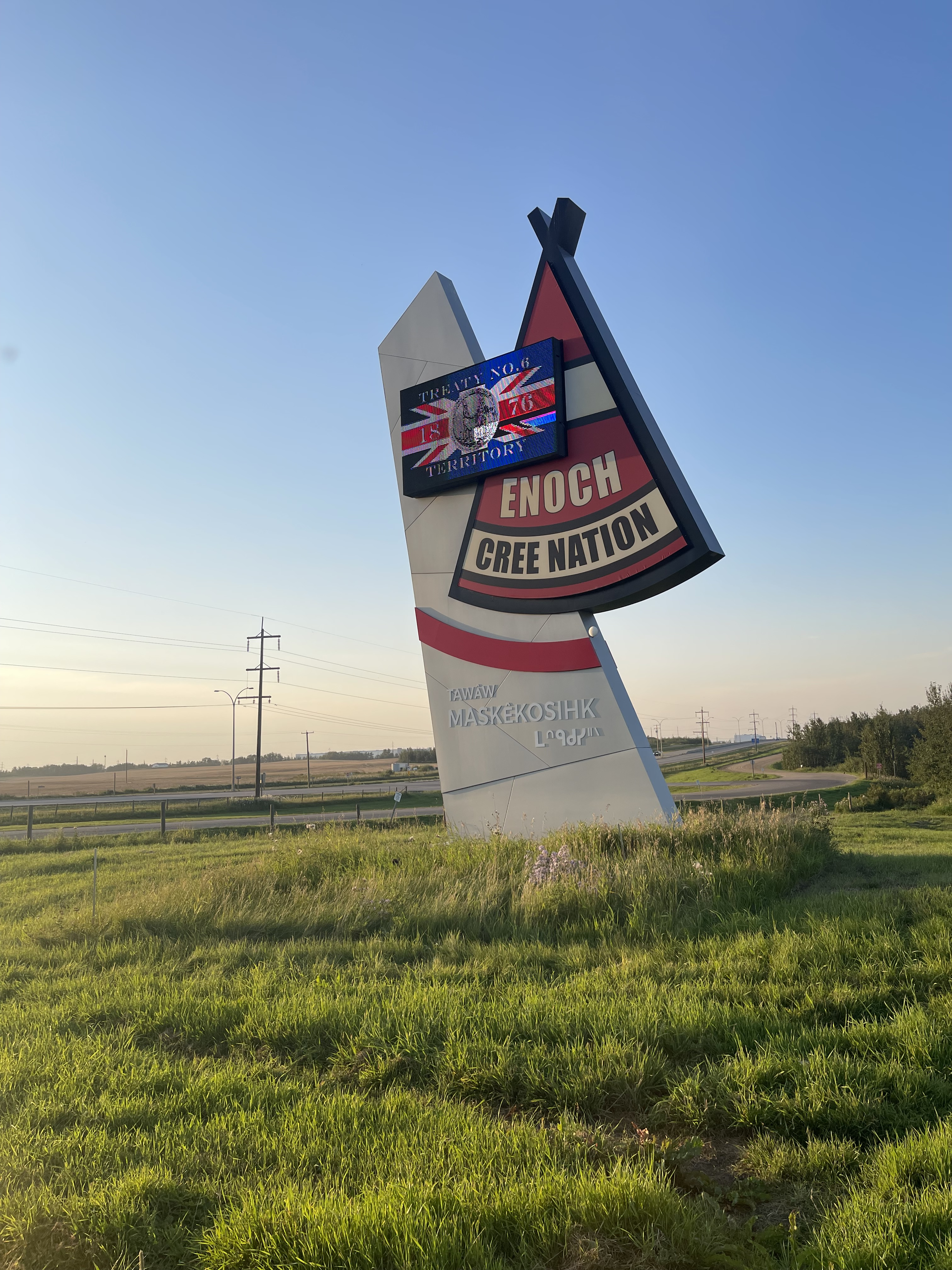
Main Enoch Cree Nation sign on Highway 60. The traditional Cree name for the nation, Maskêkosihk, is spelled ᒪᐢᑫᑯᓯᐦᐠ in Western Cree syllabics.

The Nation controls two reserves: the larger reserve, Enoch Cree Nation 135, is 20 square miles (52 km^{2}) (20 sections) or officially 5,306.20 hectares (13,111.9 acres) and west of, and adjacent to, the City of Edmonton and surrounded by Parkland County on the north, west, and south. Alberta Highway 60 cuts north–south through the centre of the reserve. The smaller reserve, 135A is 2 hectares (4.9 acres) located 43 km (27 mi) south of the Town of Barrhead.

== Population ==
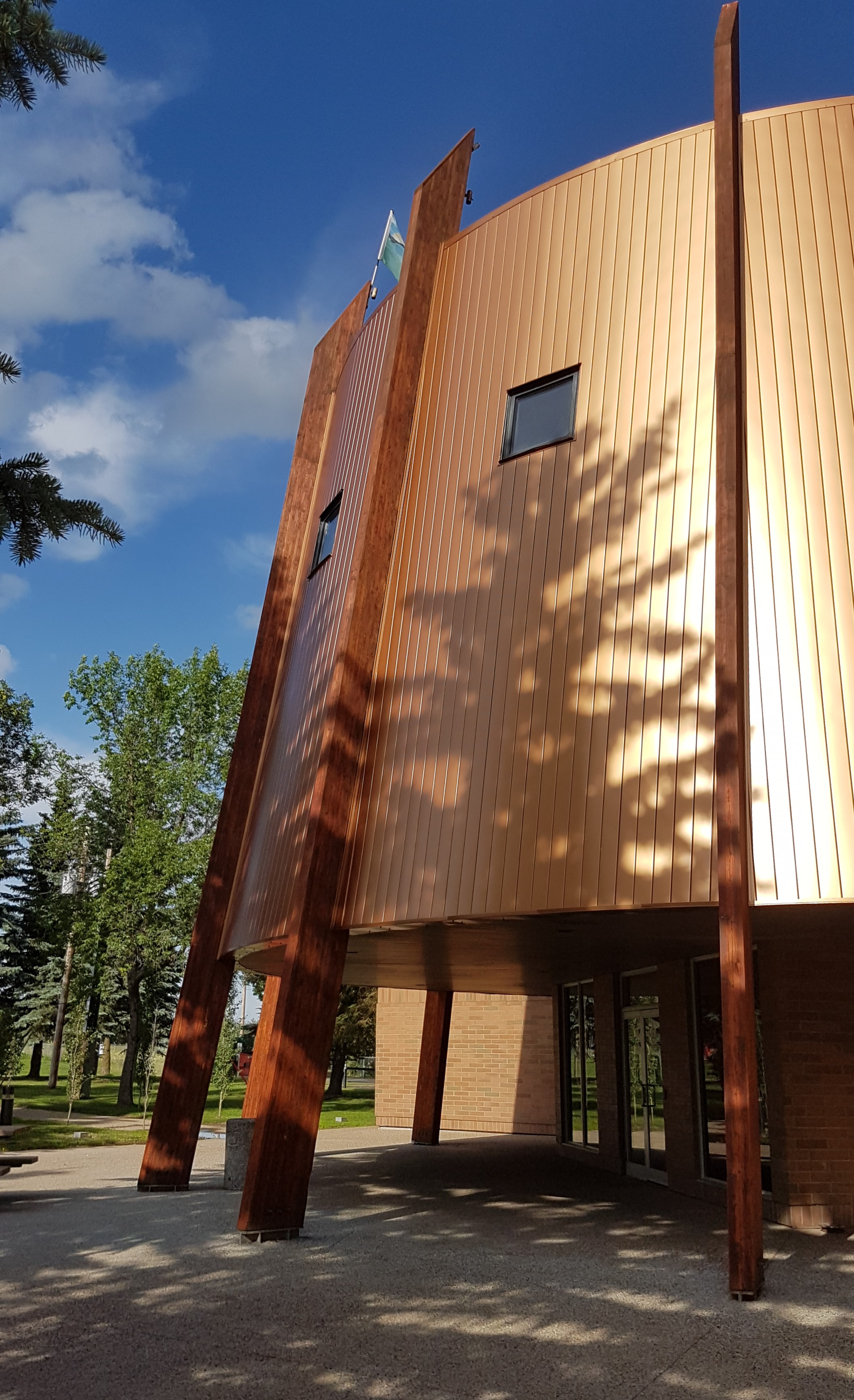
Administration building

As of October 2019, approximately 1,800 band members live on the larger reserve, while others reside elsewhere within the Edmonton Metropolitan Region. The total registered population of the Nation was 2,789 in September 2019.

Statistics Canada in the 2016 census refers to the reserve as "Stony Plain 135 Indian Reserve". At the time of the census, there were 1,690 residents on the reserve, up 71.2% from the 987 people found on the 2011 census.

== History ==
The Plains Cree people were hunter-gatherers roaming the Canadian plains. Once the Hudson's Bay Company created forts, the First Nations largely embraced the fur trade. Chief Lapotac was the earliest known leader of the Enoch Cree; he was probably descended from the Strongwood Cree, the original people of the Beaver River area east of Fort Edmonton. The Lapotac band was recognized by the Crown in 1842. When Chief Lapotac died in 1861, his son Thomas Lapotac became the Chief of the “Tommy’s Band”. In 1883 Chief Tommy Lapotac died and his brother Enoch Lapotac became chief. In 1884, Chief Enoch Lapotac joined other chiefs and signed Treaty 6. The result was the creation of "Tommy's Reserve". Tommy's reserve, which became Indian Reserve No. 135, the Stony Plain Indian Reserve, and finally Enoch Cree Nation, was originally 44 sections of land (44 sq mi or 110 km^{2}) including access to the North Saskatchewan River on the southeast corner. The band's land mass was reduced by forced surrender in 1902 and 1908 to nearly half of its original size. On January 20, 1902, the northern 12 sections (out of the original 44) were surrendered and sold to private (non-First Nation) buyers. On May 13, 1908, 10 additional sections on the east side, including river access, were surrendered. The legitimacy of the surrender was questioned and it took until July 29, 1908, for the government to officially accept it. It is disputed whether the band received fair market value for their surrendered land or were even compensated at all. In September 2022, they became a signatory to the Buffalo Treaty.

== Economy ==
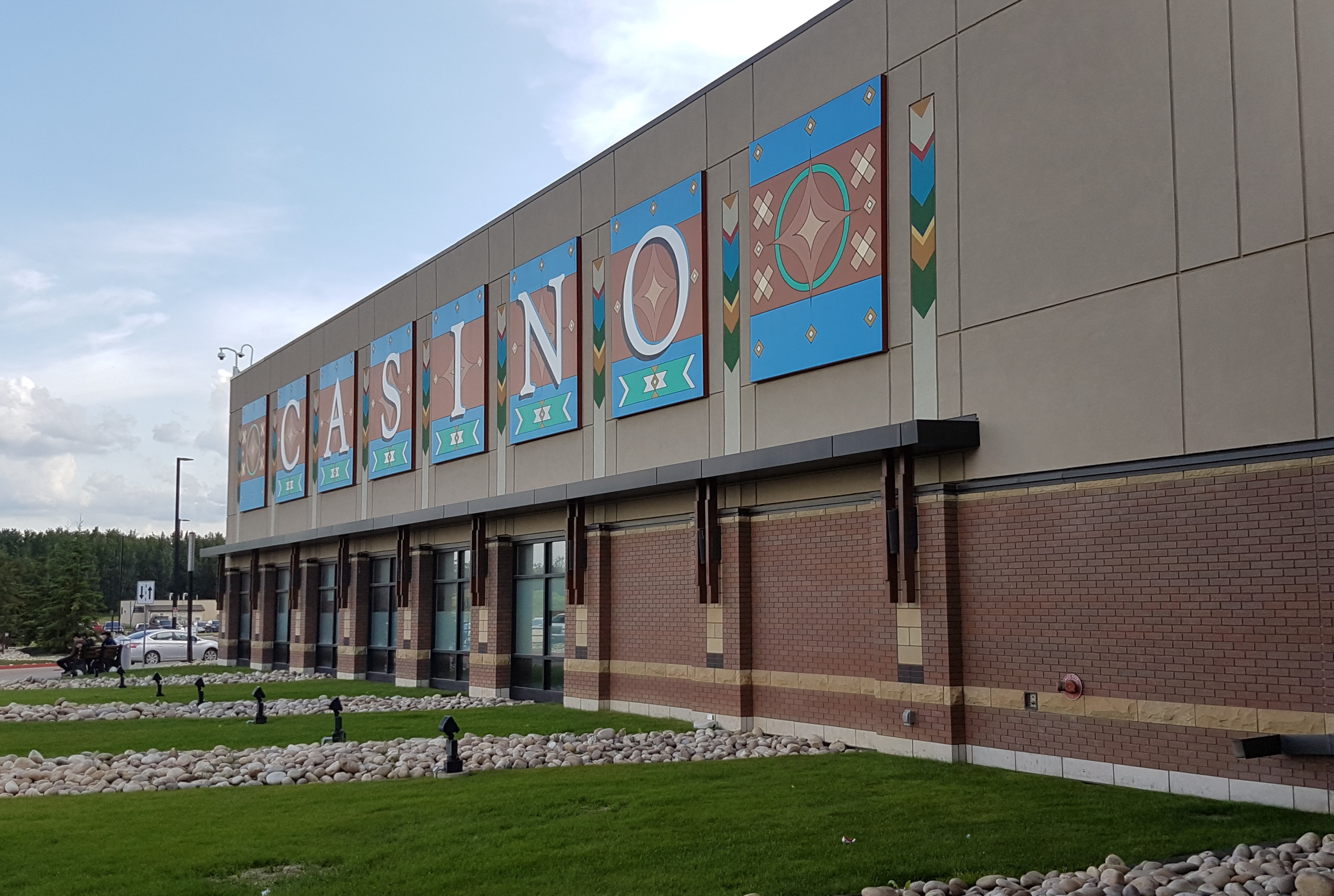
River Cree Resort and Casino

Once the band entered the reserve, their economy was largely based on agriculture. Oil was discovered on the reserve in 1947 and became a major source of band funding. The fall in oil prices oil 1986 lead the band to look for new revenue sources. In October 2006 the Nation opened the River Cree Resort and Casino, a CA$180-million casino, hotel and sports complex located on the northeast corner of the larger reserve, adjacent to the City of Edmonton.

== Environment ==
In 2014, the band entered negotiations with the Canadian Crown regarding land claim settlements over the use of reserve land by the Department of Defence as a bombing range during the Second World War. In 2020, the two parties reached a $91 million settlement (equivalent to $109.1 million in 2025) to address trauma, cleanup of the "100,000 munitions were dropped between 1942 and 1944", and lost income from a band golf course that was closed in 2014 for safety reasons.

== Notable people ==
- Ashley Callingbull-Burnham, actress, winner of Miss Universe Canada 2024
- Bill LaForge, ice hockey coach
- Crystle Lightning, musician
