= Samson Cree Nation =

One of four band governments in the area of Maskwacis, Alberta, Canada

- Band No. 444
- ᓃᐱᓰᐦᑯᐹᕽ nîpisîhkopâhk
- People: Cree
- Treaty: Treaty 6
- Headquarters: Maskwacis
- Province: Alberta

Land
- Main reserve: Samson 137
- Reserves: Samson 137A; Pigeon Lake 138A
- Land area: 156.075 km^{2} (60.261 sq mi)

Population (2019)
- On reserve: 7071
- On other land: 26
- Off reserve: 2484
- Total population: 9581

Government
- Chief: Vernon Saddleback

Tribal Council
- Maskwacis Cree Tribal Council

Website
- samsoncree.com

The Samson Cree Nation, (Cree: ᓃᐱᓰᐦᑯᐹᕽ, nîpisîhkopâhk, lit. 'at willow grove') also known as the Samson First Nation, is one of four band governments in the area of Maskwacis, Alberta, Canada.

As of August 2026, the band had a population of 9,581 registered people, of which 7,071 lived on reserve.

== History ==
In September 2015, they became a signatory of the Buffalo Treaty.

== Indian Reserves ==
Three Indian Reserves are governed by the band:

- Samson Indian Reserve No. 137
- Samson Indian Reserve No. 137A
- Pigeon Lake 138A

Pigeon Lake IR No. 138A is shared with the Louis Bull First Nation, the Montana First Nation and the Ermineskin Cree Nation.
