= Yellowhead Tribal College =

Educational institution in Edmonton

Coordinates: 53.5491°N 113.6198°W

- Type: Private
- Established: 1986
- Location: 10045 156 Street NW; Edmonton, Alberta, Canada
- Website: www.ytced.ab.ca

Yellowhead Tribal College is an educational institution located in Edmonton, Alberta, Canada, which is run by four member nations of Treaty 6 with the four members being Alexander First Nation, O'Chiese First Nation, Sunchild First Nation and Alexis Nakota Sioux Nation.

Yellowhead Tribal College is an inclusive and open learning institution that welcomes all adult learners.

== History ==
Yellowhead Tribal College (YTC) was established in 1986 by the Yellowhead Tribal Council to meet the educational needs of its member nations (Alexander First Nation, Alexis Nakota Sioux Nation, O'Chiese First Nation, and Sunchild First Nation) in the context of its primary purpose - to foster social, political, and economic development.

The college's first permanent education program, the University of College and Entrance Preparation Program (UCEPP), was established in the spring of 1984. Since then, this once-small upgrading program has evolved into a college offering its own accredited post-secondary courses, certificates, diplomas, and degree programs, some in partnership with recognized colleges and universities such as Athabasca University, MacEwan University, University of Alberta, and its sister tribal colleges, such as Blue Quills First Nations College and Maskwacis Cultural College.

All of YTC's courses contain First Nations/Aboriginal content; students are provided with a unique educational experience as they gain knowledge through Aboriginal teaching methods supported by culturally appropriate student services.

Yellowhead Tribal College is a member of the First Nation & Adult Higher Education Consortium, a non-profit organization in Western Canada, which coordinates the efforts of its members to provide quality adult and higher education, controlled entirely by people of the First Nations.

== Academics ==
Students are instructed by teachers and professors from affiliated universities and colleges. Some of the academic programs offered at Yellowhead Tribal College are as follows:

- Four Directions Literacy and Essential Skills Program
- Administrative Assistant Certificate
- Academic Upgrading
- University & College Preparation (UCEP)
- University Studies Diploma (USD)
- Management Studies Diploma (MSD)
- Early Childhood Development (ECD)
- Information Technology Certificate / Program
- Indigenous Social Work
- Indigenous Educational Assistant Program
- Off Campus Student Support
- Prior Learning Assessment & Recognition (PLAR) Program

== Library ==
The Yellowhead Tribal College Library serves the mission of the College by actively supporting its curricula and by promoting First Nations culture through its collections and programming. Students may access books and resources from disciplines such as the humanities, social sciences, business, general sciences, education and health. The library also has an extensive Aboriginal Collection which includes books, reference materials, journals, videos and DVDs, and aboriginal language resources.

YTC Library participates in the Lois Hole Campus Alberta Digital Library (LHCADL) and the First Nations Information Connection (FNIC). YTC Library is a member of The Alberta Library (TAL).

== See also ==
- List of tribal colleges and universities
