= Team Rezofficial =

Canadian musical group

- Origin: Hobbema, Alberta, Canada
- Genres: Canadian hip hop First Nations music
- Years active: 2003–2010
- Label: Arbor Records
- Spinoff of: War Party
- Members: Hellnback; Drezus; Jay Mak; Big Stomp; Tomislav Milardovic; Lakes Aqui; Big Slim
- Website: http://www.rezofficial.com/

Team Rezofficial was a Canadian aboriginal hip hop group (primarily Cree from First Nations surrounding Maskwacis, Alberta). Founded by former members of War Party, the group included musicians Karmen "Hellnback" Omeasoo, Drezus (Jeremiah Manitopyes), Jay Mak, Big Stomp, Lakes Aqui, Tomislav Milardovic, and Big Slim.

== History ==
The Group was formed in 2003. Their first album The Foundation won the Canadian Aboriginal Music Award for Best Rap / Hip-Hop album in 2004. In 2005 and 2009 the group was nominated for a Western Canadian Music Award and in 2007 they were nominated for an Aboriginal Peoples' Choice Award and another Canadian Aboriginal Music Award.

In 2009, the group released their second album The World (And Everything in It). The album's first single, "Lonely", became the first song from an aboriginal group to go to number one on Much Music's RapCity. The album garnered a nomination for Aboriginal Recording of the Year at the Juno Awards of 2009.

In February 2010, the band performed at the Aboriginal Pavilion at the 2010 Winter Olympics in Vancouver.

The band members then went their separate ways. Drezus went to prison. Milardovic became a pastor. Jay Mak continues to release music on the Rezofficial website.
