= Ermineskin 138 =

Indian reserve in Alberta, Canada

Coordinates: 52°52′07″N 113°28′55″W

- Indian reserve
- Ermineskin Indian Reserve No. 138
- Location in Alberta
- First Nation: Ermineskin Cree
- Treaty: 6
- Country: Canada
- Province: Alberta
- Municipal districts: Ponoka; Wetaskiwin

Area
  - Total: 10,295.8 ha (25,441 acres)

Population (2016)
  - Total: 2,457
  - Density: 23.86/km^{2} (61.81/sq mi)
- Time zone: UTC−06:00 (Alberta Time)

Ermineskin 138 is an Indian reserve of the Ermineskin Cree Nation in Alberta, located between Ponoka County and the County of Wetaskiwin No. 10. Part of the Maskwacis community, it is 13 kilometres (8.1 mi) south of Wetaskiwin.
