= Samson 137A =

Coordinates: 52°45′26″N 113°26′01″W

- Indian reserve
- Samson Indian Reserve No. 137A
- Location in Alberta
- First Nation: Samson Cree
- Treaty: 6
- Country: Canada
- Province: Alberta
- Municipal district: Ponoka

Area
  - Total: 134.4 ha (332 acres)

Population (2016)
  - Total: 26
  - Density: 19/km^{2} (50/sq mi)
- Time zone: UTC−06:00 (Alberta Time)

Samson 137A is an Indian reserve of the Samson Cree Nation in Alberta, located within Ponoka County. In the 2016 Canadian Census, it recorded a population of 26 living in 6 of its 6 total private dwellings.
