= Louis Bull 138B =

Coordinates: 52°53′28″N 113°33′50″W

- Indian reserve
- Louis Bull Indian Reserve No. 138B
- Location in Alberta
- First Nation: Louis Bull
- Treaty: 6
- Country: Canada
- Province: Alberta
- Municipal district: County of Wetaskiwin No. 10

Area
  - Total: 3,388.1 ha (8,372 acres)

Population (2016)
  - Total: 1,177
  - Density: 34.74/km^{2} (89.97/sq mi)
- Time zone: UTC−06:00 (Alberta Time)

Louis Bull 138B is an Indian reserve of the Louis Bull First Nation in Alberta, located within County of Wetaskiwin No. 10. One of four reserves making up the Maskwacis community, it is 16 kilometers southwest of Wetaskiwin. In the 2016 Canadian Census, it recorded a population of 1177 living in 226 of its 276 total private dwellings.

As of 2001, nearly 50% of individuals on-reserve are over the age of 15, suggesting severe demographic strain commonly found in the Third World. Average incomes among full-time labourers remain approximately $18,000 under the Alberta provincial average, and the Canadian government reports a 40% unemployment rate. The per-room occupancy rate on this reserve is double that of the provincial average.

== Education ==
Wetaskiwin Regional Division No. 11 operates public schools serving the reserve: Falun Elementary School serves primary grades, and Pigeon Lake Regional School serves secondary grades.
