= Maskwacis =

Maskwacis: ᒪᐢᑿᒌᐢ; maskwacîs (Note: This lowercase spelling, including diacritic, follows standard Plains Cree orthography and is used by various local entities.); Hobbema (1891–2013)
- Unincorporated community/Hamlet
- Area surrounding Maskwacis

- Location in Alberta
- Coordinates: 52°49.6′N 113°27.1′W
- Country: Canada
- Province: Alberta
- Reserves: Samson 137; Ermineskin 138
- Municipal district: Ponoka County
- Established: 1891
- Name change: January 1, 2014

Area (2021)
  - Land: 0.25 km^{2} (0.097 sq mi)

Population (2021)
  - Total: 64 (hamlet within Ponoka County): 7,663 (reserve population)
  - Density: 252.7/km^{2} (654/sq mi)
- Time zone: UTC−06:00 (Alberta Time)
- Postal code: T0C 1N0

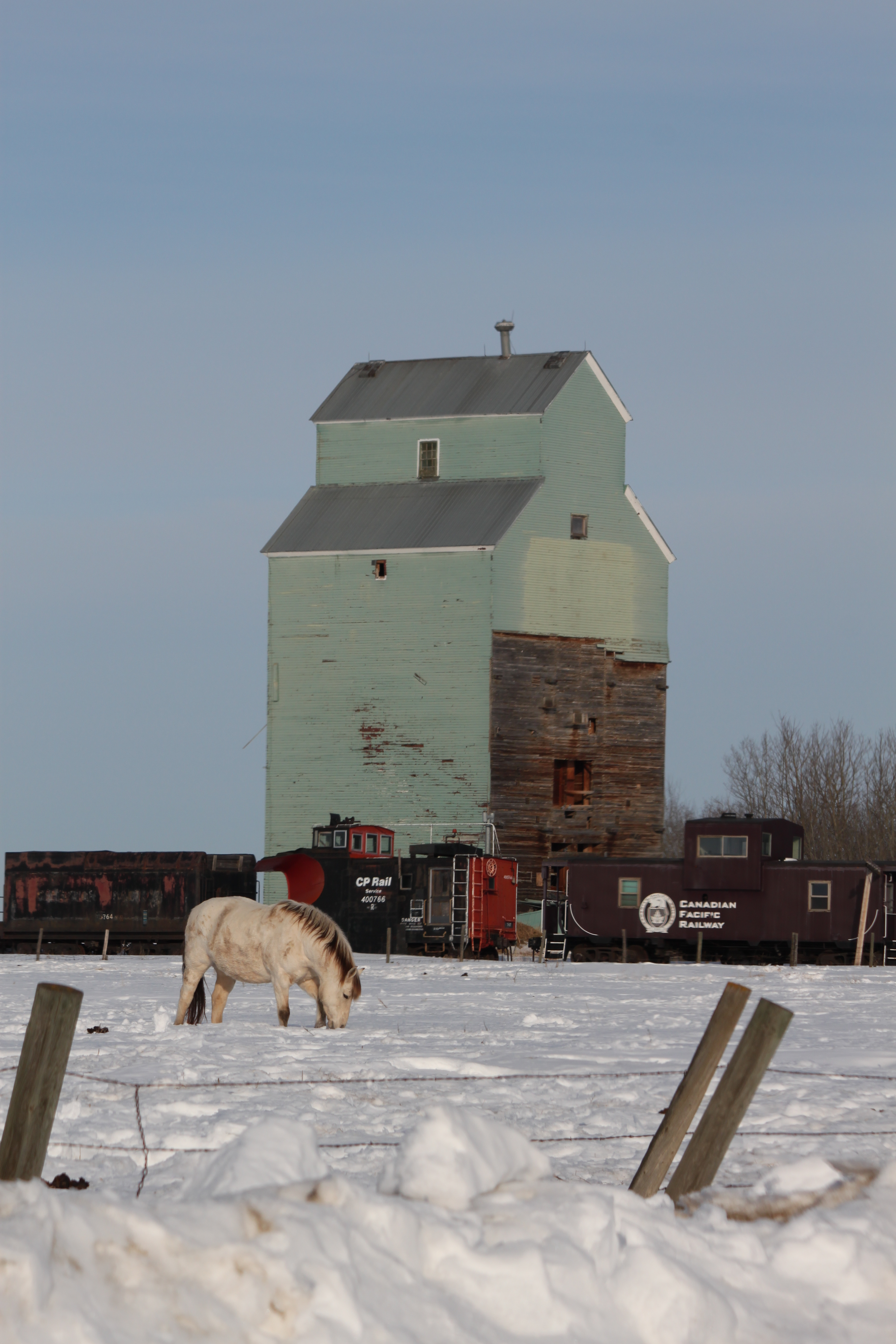
Hobbema's Alberta Grain Co. grain elevator, now at the Alberta Central Railway Museum

Maskwacis (/ˈmʌskwətʃiːs/; Cree: ᒪᐢᑿᒌᐢ, maskwacîs), renamed in 2014 from Hobbema (/hoʊˈbiːmə/), is an unincorporated community in central Alberta, Canada at the intersection of Highway 2A and Highway 611, approximately 70 kilometres (43 mi) south of the City of Edmonton. The community consists of two Cree First Nations communities – one on the Ermineskin 138 reserve to the north and the other on the Samson 137 reserve to the south. It also consists of an adjacent hamlet within Ponoka County. The community also serves three more nearby First Nations reserves including Samson 137A to the south, Louis Bull 138B to the northwest, and Montana 139 to the south.

The area was originally known as Maskwacis, and Father Constantine Scollen always referred to it as "Bear Hills" when he attempted to re-establish a Catholic mission there in late 1884 and 1885, around the time that he and Chief Bobtail succeeded in persuading the young men of the community not to join the North-West Rebellion. The first railway station was named Hobbema after the Dutch painter Meindert Hobbema during the construction of the Calgary and Edmonton Railway in 1891. As a result, all of Hobbema's neighbouring communities came to bear names of First Nations origin (Ponoka ("elk"), Menaik ("spruce"), Wetaskiwin ("hills where peace was made")), with the exception of Hobbema itself. The community, including the hamlet portion within Ponoka County, was renamed Maskwacis (meaning "bear hills" in Cree) on January 1, 2014.

The community has an employment centre, health board and college.

== Geography ==
Reserves and communities around Maskwacis

The community straddles the boundaries between the Ermineskin 138 reserve, the Samson 137 reserve and Ponoka County. The northern portion of the community is located within Ermineskin 138 on the west side of Highway 2A. The southern portion of the community is located within Samson 137 on the east side of Highway 2A and north side of Highway 611. The remaining portion of the community is located within Ponoka County on the west side of Highway 2A across from the Samson 137 portion of the community and south of the Ermineskin 138 portion of the community.

The Ermineskin 138 portion of the community is located within Census Division No. 11, while the Samson 137 and Ponoka County portions are located within Census Division No. 8.

Maskwacis serves five reserves of four Cree First Nation band governments, which are collectively known as the "four nations" and are each party to Treaty Six. The four nations include the Ermineskin Cree Nation, Samson Cree Nation, Louis Bull Tribe, and the Montana First Nation.

== Demographics ==
Population history of Maskwacis
Year	Pop.	±%
1941	52	—
1951	132	+153.8%
1956	61	−53.8%
1966	55	−9.8%
1971	51	−7.3%
1976	56	+9.8%
1981	79	+41.1%
1986	33	−58.2%
1991	30	−9.1%
2001	35	+16.7%
2006	61	+74.3%
2016	60	−1.6%
2021	64	+6.7%
Source: Statistics Canada

In the 2021 Census of Population conducted by Statistics Canada, Maskwacis had a population of 64 living in 14 of its 15 total private dwellings, a change of 6.7% from its 2016 population of 60. With a land area of 0.25 km^{2} (0.097 sq mi), it had a population density of 256.0/km^{2} (663.0/sq mi) in 2021.

As a designated place in the 2016 Census of Population conducted by Statistics Canada, Maskwacis (Hobbema) had a population of 60 living in 21 of its 22 total private dwellings, an increase from its 2011 population of 0. With a land area of 0.27 km^{2} (0.10 sq mi), it had a population density of 226.2/km^{2} in 2016.

The total population among the five reserves in the 2016 census was 7,663.

Name	Population (2016)	Population (2011)	Per cent change	Occupied dwellings	Total private dwellings	Land area (km^{2})	Population density
Ermineskin 138	2,457	1,874	31.1%	452	523	104.46	23.5
Louis Bull 138B	1,177	1,309	−10.1%	226	276	31.55	37.3
Montana 139	630	653	−3.5%	137	143	28.10	22.4
Samson 137	3,373	3,746	−10.0%	785	878	128.14	26.3
Samson 137A	26	38	−31.6%	6	6	1.34	19.4
Total reserves	7,663	7,620	0.6%	1,606	1,826	293.59	26.1/km^{2}

== Crime ==
The community has attracted national media attention in Canada for its problems with crime and gangs. In an attempt to cut down on crime, the Hobbema Cadet Corp was established with the goal of keeping children as young as eight years old off the streets.

The Pê Sâkâstêw Centre, a minimum-security facility based on Aboriginal healing processes, is in Maskwacis.

== Education and culture ==
The community is home to Maskwacis Cultural College and CHOB-TV.

Maskwacîs Education Schools Commission oversees the 11 schools throughout Ermineskin, Samson, Louis Bull, Montana, and Ma-Me-O.

Wetaskiwin Regional Division No. 11 operates public schools serving the area, including Pigeon Lake Regional School.

It was once home to Ermineskin Indian Residential School.

It is home to an annual pow wow.

Pioneering, award-winning First Nations hip-hop groups War Party and Team Rezofficial are from Maskwacis.

Briar Stewart made an award-winning documentary, "Journey to Jamaica", about a group of cadets from Maskwacis.

W. P. Kinsella wrote a number of short stories which were set in what was then called Hobbema, including the collections Dance Me Outside, The Fencepost Chronicles, Brother Frank's Gospel Hour, and The Secret of the Northern Lights. The stories "met with controversy from some critics who objected to Kinsella's appropriation of Native voice and what they saw as stereotype-based humour."

== Notable people ==
- Ted Hodgson (born 1945), retired professional ice hockey forward
- Willie Littlechild (born 1944), lawyer and Cree chief
- Willie Nepoose (died c. 1997–1998), wrongly convicted of second-degree murder in 1987
- Henry Norwest (c. 1881–1918), distinguished sniper in World War I
- Shane Yellowbird (1979–2022), country music singer-songwriter

== Sports ==
The community was formerly the home of the Hobbema Hawks junior "A" hockey team.

== See also ==
- List of communities in Alberta
- List of designated places in Alberta
- List of hamlets in Alberta
