= Rick Wilson (Canadian politician) =

Canadian politician

The Honourable Rick Wilson ECA MLA

Minister of Mental Health and Addiction
- Incumbent
- Assumed office May 16, 2025
- Premier: Danielle Smith
- Preceded by: Nicholas Milliken

Minister of Indigenous Relations of Alberta
- In office April 30, 2019 – May 16, 2025
- Premier: Jason Kenney; Danielle Smith
- Preceded by: Richard Feehan
- Succeeded by: Rajan Sawhney

Member of the Legislative Assembly of Alberta for Maskwacis-Wetaskiwin
- Incumbent
- Assumed office April 16, 2019
- Preceded by: new district

Personal details
- Born: 1957 or 1958 (age 67–68)
- Party: United Conservative Party
- Occupation: Businessman

Richard Wilson is a Canadian politician elected in the 2019 Alberta general election to represent the electoral district of Maskwacis-Wetaskiwin in the 30th Alberta Legislature. On April 30, 2019, he was appointed to the Executive Council of Alberta as the Minister of Indigenous Relations. He was re-elected in the 2023 provincial election held on May 29. On May 16, 2025, he was shuffled to Minister of Mental Health and Addiction.

Before being elected as an MLA, Wilson served as a councillor for the County of Wetaskiwin as well as on the Wetaskiwin Regional Public School Board He also owned and operated multiple businesses relating to construction and ranching. Him and his wife, Rose, live on their ranch which has been in his family for over 100 years. They have four children and seven grand children.

As minister of Indigenous Relations, Wilson sponsored 2 bills being Bill 57; Metis Settlements Amendment Act, as well as Bill 14; Alberta Indigenous Opportunities Corporation Act. Bill 14 Wilson says is “generating sustainable revenue streams for First Nations and Métis communities by removing barriers to investment capital for major projects” resulting in more than $400 million in major resource projects.

Wilson has also often spoken about the need for more resources put into rural healthcare, with the province putting in $19.5 million into the Wetaskin Hospital and Care Centre.

== Electoral history ==
=== 2023 general election ===
2023 Alberta general election: Maskwacis-Wetaskiwin
Party	Candidate	Votes	%	±%
United Conservative	Rick Wilson	11,640	67.54	+3.42
New Democratic	Katherine Swampy	4,801	27.86	+4.12
Independent	Marie Rittenhouse	520	3.02	–
Green	Justin Fuss	187	1.09	-0.20
Solidarity Movement	Suzanne Jubb	86	0.50	–
Total		17,234	99.68	–
Rejected and declined		55	0.32	
Turnout		17,289	58.01	
Eligible voters		29,805		
United Conservative hold		Swing		-0.35
Source(s) Source: Elections Alberta

=== 2019 general election ===
2019 Alberta general election: Maskwacis-Wetaskiwin
Party	Candidate	Votes	%	±%
United Conservative	Rick Wilson	12,796	64.12%	7.28%
New Democratic	Bruce Hinkley	4,737	23.74%	-17.77%
Alberta Party	Sherry Greene	1,382	6.93%	–
Freedom Conservative	David White	522	2.62%	–
Alberta Advantage Party	Wesley Rea	263	1.32%	–
Green	Desmond G. Bull	256	1.28%	–
Total		19,956	–	–
Rejected, spoiled and declined		90	–	–
Eligible electors / turnout		28,948	69.25%	–
United Conservative pickup new district.				
Source(s) Source: "74 - Maskwacis-Wetaskiwin, 2019 Alberta general election". officialresults.elections.ab.ca. Elections Alberta.

Alberta provincial government of Jason Kenney
Cabinet post (1)
Predecessor	Office	Successor
Richard Feehan	Minister of Indigenous Relations; April 30, 2019–	Incumbent
