= Sally Rice =

Professor of linguistics

Sally Rice is a professor emerita of linguistics at the University of Alberta, where she took up a position soon after earning her PhD in 1987 at the University of California, San Diego, under the supervision of Ronald W. Longacker.

Rice is known for her scholarship on the indigenous languages of Canada, especially those of the Athabaskan language family. She was one of the founding directors of CILLDI, the Canadian Indigenous Languages and Literacy Development Institute, which since 2000 has been an annual tri-Faculty summer institute to provide training in Canadian First Nations languages development.

== Awards and distinctions ==
- Rice was the Landrex Distinguished Professor in the University of Alberta Faculty of Arts from 2007 to 2011.
- Rice was a McCalla Research Professor in the University of Alberta Faculty of Arts in 2008–2009.
- Rice was awarded a grant from the Social Sciences and Humanities Research Council Of Canada (SSHRC) in 1999 for "The Daghida Project: Language Research and Revitalization in a First Nations Community (Cold Lake, Alberta)."
- Rice was awarded a grant from the Social Sciences and Humanities Research Council Of Canada (SSHRC) in 2003 for "7th Conference on Conceptual Structure, Discourse, and Language ."
- Rice and fellow linguist Joyce McDonough were awarded a grant from the US National Science Foundation in 2009 for "An Interactive Speech Atlas of Dene Speaking Communities in the Mackenzie Basin" (award 0853929).

== Canadian Indigenous Languages and Literacy Development Institute (CILLDI) ==
"There are more than 60 Aboriginal languages in Canada. With the exception of Cree, Ojibway and Inuktitut, all Canadian Indigenous languages are endangered, many critically so. Indigenous communities, colleges and universities are working to preserve — and in some cases, restore — these languages, but so far there has been no national initiative dedicated to Indigenous language sustainability in Canada."

— Sally Rice, 2016, ANVILS, University of Alberta

Sally Rice was part of a collective of language advocates and educators which including Donna Paskemin and Heather Blair, who established CILLDI in 1999 with its first summer institute held on the Onion Lake First Nation, Saskatchewan offering one course entitled "Expanding Cree Language and Literacy". CILLDI, which is hosted at the University of Alberta in Edmonton, is an intensive annual "summer school for Indigenous language activists, speakers, linguists, and teachers." It is a "multicultural, cross-linguistic, interdisciplinary, inter-regional, inter-generational" initiative. Rice is on the CILLDI Advisory Council.

== Publications ==
- 2011. Newman, John, Sally Rice, and Harald Baayen (eds.). Corpus-Based Studies in Language Use, Language Learning, and Language Documentation. Amsterdam: Rodopi.
- 2011. Rice, Sally and John Newman (eds.). Experimental and Empirical Methods in the Study of Conceptual Structure, Discourse, and Language. Stanford: CSLI/University of Chicago Press.
- 2010. Ives, John W., Sally Rice, and Edward Vajda. "Dene-Yeniseian and processes of deep change in kin terminologies." In Kari, J. and B. Potter (eds.), Anthropological Papers of the University of Alaska (APUA), Vol. 6 (1-2): 161–187. Fairbanks: UAF Press.
- 2007. Rice, Sally and Kaori Kabata. "Cross-linguistic grammaticalization patterns of the ALLATIVE." Linguistic Typology 11: 453–516.
- 2004. Newman, John and Sally Rice. "Patterns of usage for English SIT, STAND, and LIE: A cognitively-inspired exploration in corpus linguistics." Cognitive Linguistics 15: 351–396.
- 1999. Rice, Sally. "Patterns of acquisition in the emerging mental lexicon: The case of to and for in English." Brain and Language 68:268-276.
- 1995. Sandra, Dominiek and Sally Rice. "Network analyses of prepositional meaning: Mirroring whose mind—the linguist’s or the language user’s?" Cognitive Linguistics 6:89-130.
