= Shane Yellowbird =

Canadian country music singer-songwriter (1979–2022)

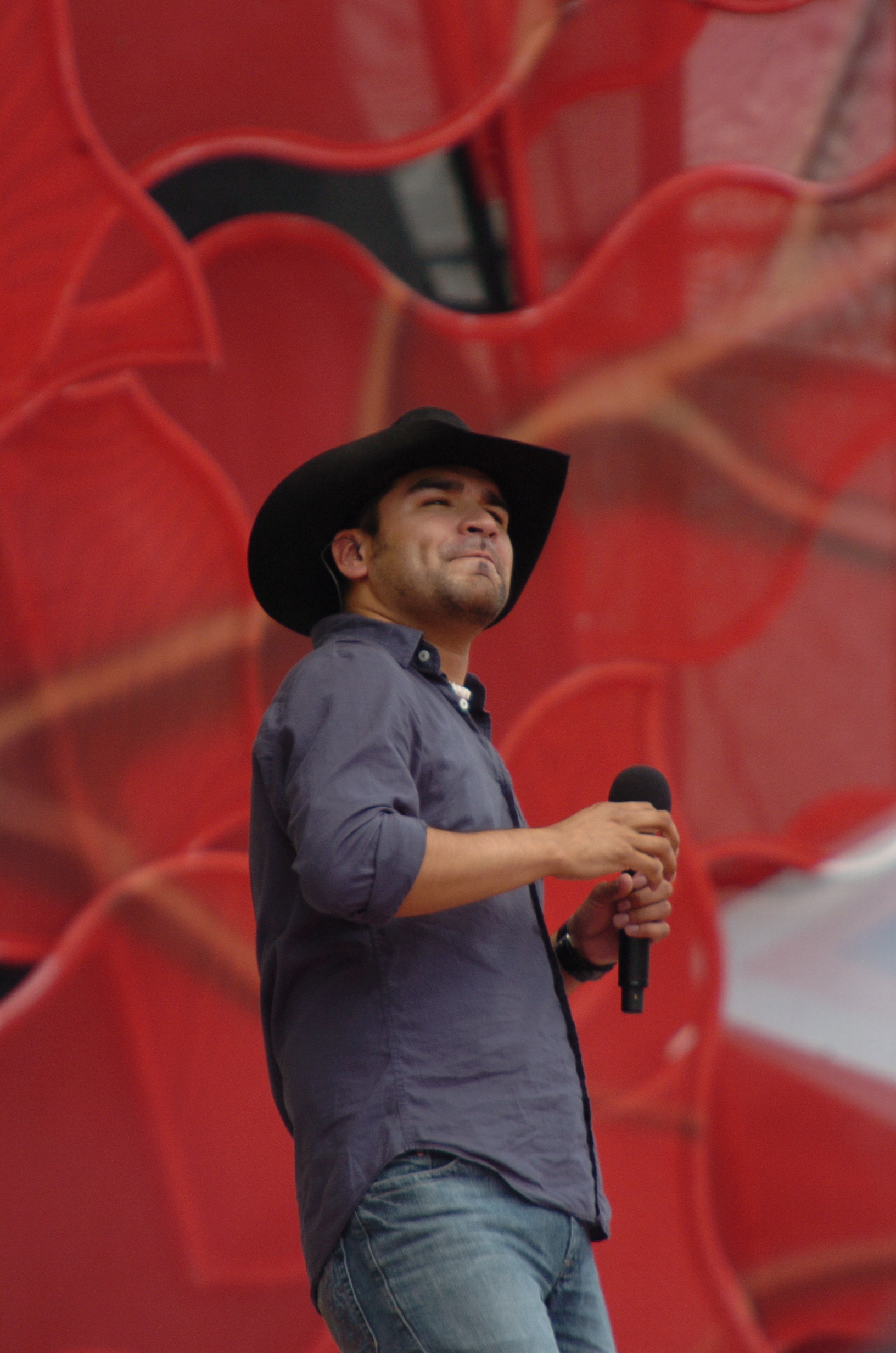
- Yellowbird in 2009

Background information
- Born: July 7, 1979; Hobbema, Alberta, Canada (now Maskwacis, Alberta)
- Died: April 25, 2022 (aged 42) Calgary, Alberta, Canada
- Genres: Country
- Occupation: Singer-songwriter
- Years active: 2005–2022
- Labels: 306 Records, On Ramp

Shane Yellowbird (July 7, 1979 – April 25, 2022) was a Canadian country music singer-songwriter from Maskwacis, Alberta. A Cree, in 2007, he was named the Aboriginal Entertainer of the Year at the Aboriginal People's Choice Music Awards, Chevy Trucks' Rising Star of the Year at the Canadian Country Music Awards and his song "Pickup Truck" was one of the year's ten most played country songs.

== Early life ==
Yellowbird was born in Hobbema, Alberta, on 7 July 1979. He attended Ponoka Composite High School. He suffered a severe stuttering problem as a child, for which he attended a speech therapist who suggested he sing his sentences. This method proved successful in treating him, and led to an interest in music.

== Career ==
Yellowbird was signed by O'Reilly International in 2003. Three years later, he released his debut album titled Life Is Calling My Name. The album includes the singles "Beautiful Concept," "They're All About You," "Pickup Truck" and "I Remember the Music." In November 2006, Yellowbird won three awards at the Aboriginal People's Choice Music Awards ceremony, including Best New Artist, Single of the Year ("Beautiful Concept") and Best Video ("Beautiful Concept").

Yellowbird opened for Emerson Drive on their cross-Canada tour, and was chosen to represent his native Canada by performing at the Fourth Annual Global Artist Party at the CMA Music Festival in June 2007. Yellowbird was named the Chevy Trucks Rising Star of the Year at the 2007 Canadian Country Music Awards.

"Pickup Truck," Yellowbird's third single, also became his first Top 5 song on the Canadian Country Singles chart in the summer of 2007. The song also peaked at No. 64 on the all-genre Canadian Hot 100, while the video topped the CMT Chevy Top 20 in July. It was one of the ten most played country music songs of the year in Canada. Yellowbird opened the 2007 Aboriginal People's Choice Music Awards, starring with Lorne Cardinal and Gabrielle Miller of Corner Gas. Later that evening, he was named the Aboriginal Entertainer of the Year. He also won awards for Best Country CD (Life Is Calling My Name) and Best Music Video ("Pickup Truck"). Yellowbird later won three trophies at the 2007 Canadian Aboriginal Music Awards, including Best Male Artist, Best Country Album and Best Album of the Year (Life Is Calling My Name). He was also nominated for the 2008 Juno Award for Country Recording of the Year, for Life Is Calling My Name.

Yellowbird's second album, It's About Time was released on November 17, 2009, featuring the single, "Bare Feet on the Blacktop". In the United States, the video received a nomination from the Native American Music Association. Yellowbird won two Native American Music Awards for Best Country Recording for "Life Is Calling My Name" in 2011 and won Best Country Recording for "It's About Time" in 2012.

== Personal life ==
At the time of his death, Yellowbird was in a domestic partnership with fiancée Sarah Garrow. The couple announced their engagement hours before his death was announced. He had four children. He suffered from epilepsy and had occasional seizures.

Yellowbird died on April 25, 2022, in Calgary. He was 42 years old.

== Discography ==
=== Studio albums ===
Title	Details
Life Is Calling My Name	Release date: October 24, 2006; Label: 306 Records
It's About Time	Release date: November 17, 2009; Label: On Ramp Records

=== Singles ===
Year	Single	Peak positions		Album
Year	Single	CAN Country	CAN	Album
2005	"Beautiful Concept"	29	—	Life Is Calling My Name
2006	"They're All About You"	13	—	Life Is Calling My Name
2007	"Pickup Truck"	5	64	Life Is Calling My Name
2007	"I Remember the Music"	4	85	Life Is Calling My Name
2008	"Drive Me Home"	11	—	Life Is Calling My Name
2008	"Life Is Calling My Name"	21	—	Life Is Calling My Name
2009	"Bare Feet on the Blacktop"	10	99	It's About Time
2010	"Watching You Walk Away"	16	—	It's About Time
2010	"I Get That a Lot These Days"	35	—	It's About Time
2011	"I Can Help You with That"	32	—	It's About Time
2012	"Sedona Arizona"	46	—	It's About Time
2013	"I'm Not Wearing Boots Today"	—	—	Non-album single
"—" denotes releases that did not chart

=== Music videos ===
Year	Video	Director
2005	"Beautiful Concept"	Antonio Hrynchuk
2006	"They're All About You"	Antonio Hrynchuk
2007	"Pickup Truck"	Stephano Barberis
2010	"Watching You Walk Away"	

== Awards and nominations ==
Year	Association	Category	Result	Ref(s)
2007	Canadian Country Music Association	Chevy Trucks Rising Star Award	Won	
2007	Canadian Country Music Association	Album of the Year – Life Is Calling My Name	Nominated	
2007	Canadian Country Music Association	Single of the Year – "Pickup Truck"	Nominated	
2007	Canadian Country Music Association	CMT Video of the Year – "Pickup Truck"	Nominated	
2007	Canadian Country Music Association	Independent Male Artist of the Year	Nominated	
2008	Juno Awards	Country Recording of the Year – Life Is Calling My Name	Nominated	
2008	Canadian Country Music Association	Male Artist of the Year	Nominated	
2010	Canadian Country Music Association	CMT Video of the Year – "Watching You Walk Away"	Nominated	
2011	Canadian Country Music Association	Single of the Year – "Watching You Walk Away"	Nominated	
