= Lucille Watahomigie =

Hualapai educator and linguist

- Born: 1945 (age 80–81); Valentine, Arizona, U.S.
- Occupations: Educator, linguist
- Known for: Hualapai bilingual/bicultural education program; co-founding the American Indian Language Development Institute

Academic background
- Education: Northern Arizona University (BA); University of Arizona (MA)

Lucille Watahomigie (born 1945 in Valentine, Arizona) is a Hualapai educator, linguist, and native speaker of the Hualapai language. She is known for founding the Hualapai bilingual and bicultural education program and co-founding the American Indian Language Development Institute (AILDI) at the University of Arizona.

== Early career ==
After receiving her bachelor's degree in elementary education from Northern Arizona University, Watahomigie returned to the Hualapai community of Peach Springs and became a teacher at the Peach Springs School. She subsequently earned her master's degree at the University of Arizona, where she also served as a professor for three years.

== Hualapai bilingual education program ==
In 1975, Watahomigie returned to the Hualapai Nation to found the Hualapai bilingual and bicultural education program in response to community demand. In 1982, she co-authored the Hualapai Reference Grammar, the first full reference grammar of the language, as well as a dictionary, and was instrumental in developing a practical orthography for Hualapai.

== American Indian Language Development Institute ==
In 1987, Watahomigie founded the American Indian Language Development Institute (AILDI) at the University of Arizona. The institute has provided linguistic training to many Indigenous language educators and promoted the development and revitalization of Native languages in Arizona and throughout the United States. AILDI also served as the inspiration for the Canadian Indigenous Languages and Literacy Development Institute (CILLDI), which was established in 1999. Watahomigie has taught at the institute since its inception and continues to do so on a regular basis.

== Other works ==
Watahomigie's other published works include Spirit Mountain: An Anthology of Yuman Story and Song, of which she was an editor, as well as works on bilingual education, ethnobotany, linguistics, and language revitalization.
