= Fouquescourt =

- Commune
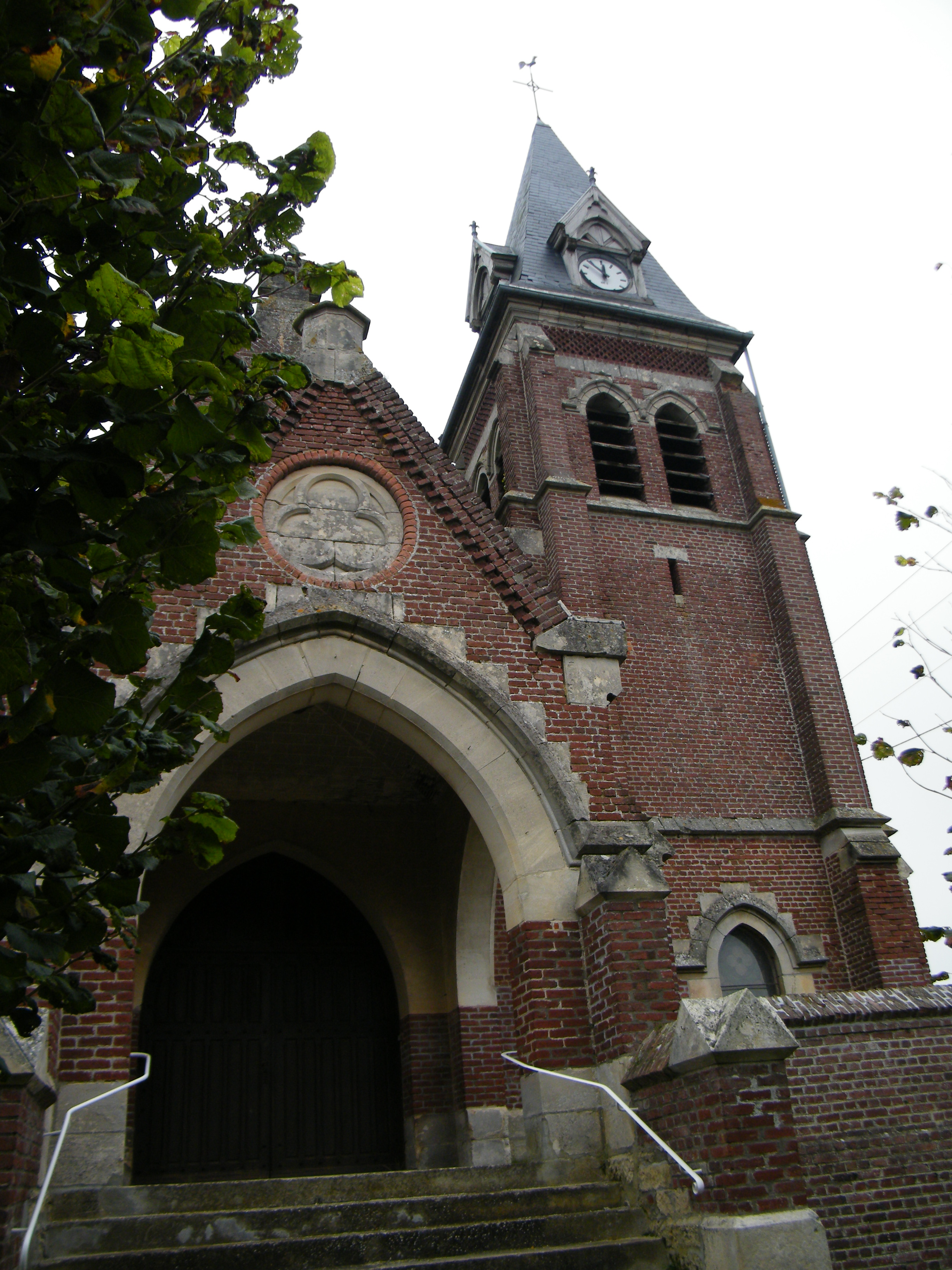
- The church in Fouquescourt
- Location of Fouquescourt
- Location within France Location within Hauts-de-France
- Coordinates: 49°46′14″N 2°45′10″E
- Country: France
- Region: Hauts-de-France
- Department: Somme
- Arrondissement: Péronne
- Canton: Moreuil
- Intercommunality: CC Terre de Picardie

Government
  - Mayor (2020–2026): Jean-Noël Cazé
- Area^{1}: 5.45 km^{2} (2.10 sq mi)
- Elevation: 90 m (300 ft)
- Highest elevation: 101 m (331 ft)
- Lowest elevation: 83 m (272 ft)
- Population (2023): 154
  - Density: 28.3/km^{2} (73.2/sq mi)
- Time zone: UTC+01:00 (CET)
  - Summer (DST): UTC+02:00 (CEST)
- INSEE/Postal code: 80339 /80170
- ^{1} French Land Register data, which excludes lakes, ponds, glaciers > 1 km^{2} (0.386 sq mi or 247 acres) and river estuaries.

Fouquescourt is a commune in the Somme department in Hauts-de-France in northern France.

== Geography ==
Fouquescourt is situated 25 miles (40 km) southeast of Amiens on the D161 road.

== Population ==
Historical population
Year	Pop.	±% p.a.
1968	151	—
1975	139	−1.18%
1982	136	−0.31%
1990	153	+1.48%
1999	127	−2.05%
2007	152	+2.27%
2012	171	+2.38%
2017	158	−1.57%
2023	154	−0.43%
Source: INSEE

== See also ==
- Communes of the Somme department
