= War Party (band) =

- Origin: Maskwacis, Alberta, Canada
- Genres: Canadian hip hop First Nations music
- Years active: 1995–2004
- Spinoffs: RezOfficial
- Members: Rex Smallboy; Hellnback; Big Stomp

War Party is a Cree hip-hop group from Maskwacis, Alberta. Its founding members are Rex Smallboy and Ryan Small. The members are ex-wife Cynthia, Karmen "Hellnback" Omeasoo, Bryan Omeosoo, and Tom Crier. The band's music combines rap rhythms with aboriginal themes and stories.

== History ==
War Party was founded in 1995 by Rex Smallboy and Ryan Small. Three others later became involved. The group won the Canadian Aboriginal Music Award for Best Rap Album in 2001, and was nominated again in 2002 and 2003. As well, they were the first First Nations rap group to have a music video aired on Much Music.

War Party performed and recorded together for twelve years. The group then disbanded; Hellnback and Big Stomp of the group went on to form RezOfficial.

== In popular culture ==
The band's song "This Land Was Ours" is featured in Ari Gold's 2008 film Adventures of Power.

== Discography ==
- The Reign (2000)
- The Greatest Natives from the North (2003)
- Exclusive Rez Cuts (2002)
- The Resistance (20??)
