= Ermineskin Cree Nation =

Cree First Nations band government in Alberta, Canada

- Band No. 443
- ᓀᔮᐢᑵᔮᕽ; neyâskweyâhk
- People: Cree
- Treaty: Treaty 6
- Headquarters: Maskwacis
- Province: Alberta

Land
- Main reserve: Ermineskin 138
- Reserve: Pigeon Lake 138A
- Land area: 122.169 km^{2} (47.170 sq mi)

Population (2019)
- On reserve: 3290
- On other land: 11
- Off reserve: 1578
- Total population: 4879

Government
- Chief: Joel Mykat

Website
- ermineskin.ca

Ermineskin Cree Nation /ˈɜːrmɪn.skɪn/ also known as the Ermineskin Tribe (Cree: ᓀᔮᐢᑵᔮᕽ, neyâskweyâhk), is a Cree First Nations band government in Alberta, Canada. A signatory to Treaty 6, Ermineskin is one of the Four Nations of Maskwacis, Alberta's largest Indigenous community.

As of 2019, there are 4,879 registered Ermineskin Cree, of which 3,290 were living on reserve.

== Name ==
The First Nation took its name from Ermineskin Kosikosowayano also known as Baptiste Piche), Chief of the Bear Hills Cree. He was the son of Peechee (Pisu - "Mountain Lion", also known as Louis Piche), Chief of the Asini Wachi Nehiyawak (Cree groups of the Rocky/Mountain Cree) and later head chief of the Rocky Mountain Cree (Asini Wachi Wi Iniwak or Asinīskāwiyiniwak) and also brother-in-law of Poundmaker, Chief of the River Cree (Sipi Wi Iniwak or Sīpīwininiwak). Ermineskin was the younger brother of the well-known Kiskiyo, Bobtail, also known as Alexis Piche), who became Chief of the Bear Hills Cree after the death of their father Louie Piche also known as Pisu) who was the chief of the Rocky Cree (Asini Wachi Wi Iniwak or Asinīskāwiyiniwak) and became later head chief of the Western Cree (‘Pakisimotan Wi Iniwak’) and soon after head chief of all the groups of the Upstream People (Natimiw Iyiniwak or Natimiyininiwak).

== Indian reserves ==
The Ermineskin Cree Nation's two reserves (around Maskwacis, Alberta) total about 22,512 hectares and lived in an area around Pigeon Lake and the Bear Hills (known in Cree as Maskwacheesihkare). Therefore, they were called Maskwa Wachi-is Ininiwak, Maskwacheesihk Wiyiniwak or Amiskwacīwiyiniwak, meaning 'Bear Hills Cree'. While the Ermineskin traditional territory includes the reserve lands, the reserve was formally established in 1885. The land houses substantial oil and gas deposits, agricultural land, and waterfront access to Pigeon Lake. The Canadian Pacific Kansas City railway runs through the reserve.

The two reserves are:

- Ermineskin Indian Reserve No. 138, 10295.8 ha.
- Pigeon Lake Indian Reserve No. 138A, 1921 ha.

Pigeon Lake IR No. 138A is shared with three other governments, the Samson First Nation, the Louis Bull First Nation and the Montana First Nation.

== History ==
In September 2019, they became a signatory to the Buffalo Treaty.

== Notable members ==
- Willie Littlechild
