= Iohahi:io Akwesasne Education & Training Institute =

Aboriginal-owned and controlled post-secondary institution in Quebec, Canada

Coordinates: 45°00′34″N 74°36′11″W

- Motto: Akwesasne Adult Education
- Type: Aboriginal-owned and controlled post-secondary institution.
- Established: 1985
- Affiliations: Indian & Northern Affairs Canada, Mohawk Council of Akwesasne, Quebec Native Affairs, St. Lawrence College, Ontario
- President: Vincenette Cook
- Undergraduates: university, and continuing education students
- Location: 16 Iohahi:io Road Akwesasne, Quebec, Canada H0M 1A1
- Campus: reserve Akwesasne Territory
- Website: iohahiio.ambe.ca

Iohahi:io Akwesasne Education & Training Institute is an Aboriginal-owned and controlled post-secondary institution for the Mohawks of Akwesasne.

Aboriginal institutes partner with colleges and universities to offer students degree programs, apprenticeships, certificate programs and diploma programs. IAAEC was founded to provide greater access to post-secondary education for Aboriginal peoples. IAAEC delivers post-secondary programs approved by the Ministry of Training, Colleges and Universities.

== History ==
Since 1993, Iohahi:io Akwesasne Adult Education Centre has offered college and university programs through agreements with public colleges and universities such as St. Lawrence College.

In 2006, the Iohahi:io Akwesasne Adult Education Centre introduced masonry, carpentry, plumbing, and electrical trades training.

== IAAEC Mohawk creation story murals and sculpture ==
In 2009-11 Tammy King, Natasha Thompson and Inez Cook Patterson, who were students in the two year Fine Arts Diploma course, painted a series of seven murals in the IAAEC entryway depicting the Mohawk Creation story, which is built around the central figure of Sky Woman. Sandra Taylor Hedges, an instructor of painting and drawing at IAAAEC, incorporated a sculpture of Sky Woman into the sky light above the murals in 2011.

On March 21, 2019, the Ahkwesahsne Mohawk Board of Education - Board of Trustees - met and approved a name change from “Iohahi:io Akwesasne Adult Education” to “Iohahi:io Akwesasne Education & Training Institute.

== Partnerships ==
Iohahi:io Akwesasne Education & Training Institute offers programs and courses of study in partnership with all levels of government; commissions; industries; commerce and other education and training institutions.

== Programs offered ==
The Iohahi:io Akwesasne Education & Training Institute is a community-based agency providing adults with tutoring in literacy and basic skills, in a culturally sensitive manner to increase their academic skills for entry into higher level education and/or to obtain employment. The programs offered include:

- Academic assessments
- One-to-one tutoring
- Refresher workshops
- Online learning
- Essential skills and workforce literacy
- Career and/or college preparation sessions
- New computer training for adults with no computer experience
- Networking

=== University and College ===
College diploma courses at Iohahi:io include:

- Trades - masonry, carpentry, plumbing, and electrical
- Two-year Fine Arts Diploma course
- Practical Nursing with Aboriginal Communities
- Police Foundations
- Office Administration
- Business
- Community Justice Services
- Social Services Worker

=== Continuing Education ===
- Workshops & Seminars

=== Secondary School and Homework Support ===
- Homework Support Program

== Scholarships & Bursaries ==
The government of Canada sponsors an Aboriginal Bursaries Search Tool that lists over 680 scholarships, bursaries, and other incentives offered by governments, universities, and industry to support Aboriginal post-secondary participation.
