= Maskwacis Cultural College =

First Nation-operated college in Alberta

- Former name: Maskwacis Cultural Centre
- Motto: Start your journey
- Type: Two-year tribal college
- President: Interim President since 2025
- Location: P.O. Box 960 Maskwacis T0C 1N0, Alberta; 52.8210°N 113.4544°W
- Campus: urban/suburban reserve
- Website: http://www.mccedu.ca

Maskwacis Cultural College (MCC) is a private post-secondary institution within the Four Nations of Maskwacis, Alberta, Canada. MCC offers programs from basic adult literacy to two-year college diplomas to university transfer programs.

== Partnerships ==
Maskwacis Cultural College is a member of the First Nation and Adult Higher Education Consortium, a non-profit organization in Western Canada, which coordinates its members' efforts to provide quality adult and higher education, all of which is controlled entirely by First Nations people.

== History ==
In 1974, the Four Bands of Hobbema established the Maskwacis Cultural Centre under the Cultural/Educational Centres Program of Indian Affairs Canada. From 1974 to 1986, the Maskwacis Cultural Centre's mission was to preserve Plains Cree culture and history, to support Cree language development, and to provide Post-secondary opportunities to members of the Four Nations by brokering courses from various public institutions.

In 1986, the Board of Governors, with the assistance and support of the Chiefs of the Samson, Ermineskin, Louis Bull and Montana Bands, sought formal recognition for the Maskwachees Cultural Centre as a post-secondary institution. In July 1988, the Legislative Assembly of Alberta passed the Maskwacîs Cultural College Act (Bill PR20), establishing the Maskwachees Cultural College as a Private Post-Secondary Institution in Alberta with the authority to grant certification to students at the Certificate and Diploma levels.

In 1987, Maskwacis Cultural College's university courses were recognized as transfer equivalencies at the University of Alberta, the University of Calgary, the University of Lethbridge and Augustana University College. Since then, Maskwachees Cultural College's university courses have been brokered to the Yellowhead Tribal Council in Edmonton, and the MCC Early Childhood Development Program has been brokered to the Lesser Slave Lake Indian Regional Council at Grouard, Alberta.

== Programs ==
Students can complete the first two years of various university degrees at MCC, as well as a variety of upgrading, certificate and diploma programs.

== Academics ==
Students are instructed by professors from affiliated universities and colleges. Some of the academic programs offered at MCC are as follows:

- Adult Basic Education (ABE)
- Bachelor of Education
- Bachelor of Arts
- Academic Upgrading
- Cree Language Instructor Training Diploma
- Diploma leading to Bachelor of Education
- Diploma leading to Bachelor of Arts
- First Nations Management Diploma
- Indigenous Social Work Diploma
- Educational Assistant (Special Needs)
- First Nations Management
- Indigenous Social Work
- Maskwacis Administrative Assistant
- Off-Campus Student Support
- Prior Learning Assessment & Recognition (PLAR) Program
- University & College Preparation (UCEPP)
- University outreach program

=== Scholarships and bursaries ===
The Government of Canada sponsors an Aboriginal Bursaries Search Tool that lists over 680 scholarships, bursaries, and other incentives offered by governments, universities, and industry to support Aboriginal post-secondary participation.

== See also ==
- List of tribal colleges and universities
