= Samson 137 =

Coordinates: 52°47.32′N 113°23.32′W

- Indian reserve
- Samson Indian Reserve No. 137
- Location in Alberta
- First Nation: Samson Cree Nation
- Treaty: 6
- Country: Canada
- Province: Alberta
- Municipal district: Ponoka
- Headquarters: Maskwacis

Area
  - Land: 128.14 km^{2} (49.48 sq mi)

Population (2016)
  - Total: 3,373
  - Density: 26.3/km^{2} (68/sq mi)
- Time zone: UTC−06:00 (Alberta Time)

Samson Indian Reserve No. 137, also known as Samson No. 137 and Samson 137, and as the Samson Reserve, is an Indian reserve in Maskwacis, Alberta, Canada.

It is inhabited by members of the Samson Cree Nation and was established under the provisions of Treaty 6.

The reserve is located in Central Alberta, near Maskwacis and south of Wetaskiwin.

== Demographics ==
In 2006, Samson IR No.137 had a population of 3,295 residents in 929 dwellings, a 7.4% increase from 2001. The Indian reserve has a land area of 128.07 km^{2} (49.45 sq mi) and a population density of 25.7/km^{2} (67/sq mi). By 2009, the Alberta government estimated that the on-reserve population of the nation was 5,550, making the Samson Cree the third largest First Nation in Alberta.

== Government ==
Under the British North America Act, legislative authority over Indian reserves is placed exclusively with the national parliament and specifically the Department of Indian Affairs and Northern Development. The reserve is governed by a band council led by Chief Vernon Saddleback.

== See also ==
- List of Indian reserves in Alberta
