= Intercultural Maya University of Quintana Roo =

Mexican university

Coordinates: 19°45′32″N 88°43′28″W

The Intercultural Maya University of Quintana Roo (Spanish: Universidad Intercultural Maya de Quintana Roo, abbreviated UIMQROO) is a public institution of higher education in José Maria Morelos Municipality, Quintana Roo.

The university is an initiative to develop intercultural pedagogy and designing the institutional settings, resting on elements that include learning and innovation of knowledge that combines aspects of the local culture with conventional education in favor of the society of the indigenous Yucatec Maya population.

In 2022, the university had 905 students enrolled. The areas with the highest number of enrolled:

1. Bachelor of alternative tourism (145);
2. Bachelor of language and culture (143), and;
3. Engineering in information technology and communications (127).
