= Louis Bull Tribe =

First Nations band government in Alberta, Canada

- Band No. 439
- ᑭᓭ ᐸᑎᓇᕽ kisipatnahk
- People: Cree
- Treaty: Treaty 6
- Headquarters: Maskwacis
- Province: Alberta

Land
- Main reserve: Louis Bull 138B
- Reserve: Pigeon Lake 138A
- Land area: 53.092 km^{2} (20.499 sq mi)

Population (2026)
- On reserve: 2029
- On other land: 8
- Off reserve: 539
- Total population: 2576

Government
- Chief: Desmond Bull

Website
- louisbulltribe.ca

The Louis Bull Tribe (Cree: ᑭᓭ ᐸᑎᓇᕽ, kisipatnahk) is a First Nations band government in Alberta, Canada. One of the "four nations" of Maskwacis, it controls one Indian reserve, Louis Bull 138B, and shares ownership of another, Pigeon Lake 138A.

As of August 2026, the band had a population of 2,577 registered people, of which 2,029 lived on reserve.

== History ==
In May 2018, they became signatories to the Buffalo Treaty.
