= Montana First Nation =

Canadian Treaty 6 government

- Band No. 442
- ᐊᑳᒥᕽ akâmihk
- People: Cree
- Treaty: Treaty 6
- Headquarters: Maskwacis
- Province: Alberta

Land
- Main reserve: Montana 139
- Reserve: Pigeon Lake 138A
- Land area: 47.459 km^{2} (18.324 sq mi)

Population (2026)
- On reserve: 862
- Off reserve: 296
- Total population: 1158

Government
- Chief: Ralph Cattleman

Website
- montanafirstnation.com

The Montana First Nation (Cree: ᐊᑳᒥᕽ, akâmihk) is a First Nations band government in Alberta, Canada. It is a Treaty 6 government. Formerly the Montana Band of Indians, it is one of four First Nations in the area of Maskwacis. As of 2026, the band had a population of 1,158 registered people, of which the on-reserve population was 862 people.

== Indian Reserves ==
There are two reserves under the governance of the band:

- Montana 139
- Pigeon Lake 138A

== History ==
The land where the Montana First Nation now sits near Wetaskiwin was originally set aside for the Bobtail Band of Indians. When the band was dispersed, the land was abandoned.

After it lay substantially vacant for a period of time, Little Bear, son of Cree chief Big Bear saw it as a place for his band, which had previously taken up residence in Montana (U.S.). Due to support from missionary John Chantler McDoubgall, the land was granted to the Montana Band of Indians.

In 1909 the reserve was reduced in size to just 10 squre miles. The band is currently contesting that reduction.

In September 2019, they became signatories to the Buffalo Treaty.
