= Pigeon Lake 138A =

Indian reserve in Alberta, Canada

Coordinates: 52°59′06″N 113°56′31″W

Location of Pigeon Lake 138A Alberta

Pigeon Lake 138A is an Indian reserve in Alberta. It is located 39 kilometres (24 mi) west of Wetaskiwin along Pigeon Lake. It is at an elevation of 860 metres (2,820 ft). It is shared between the Samson Cree Nation, the Montana Cree Nation, the Louis Bull Tribe, and the Ermineskin Cree Nation. In September 2016, Pigeon Lake signed the Buffalo Treaty.

== Education ==
Mimiw Sakahikan school Wetaskiwin Regional Division No. 11 operates public schools serving the reserve: Falun Elementary School serves primary grades, and Pigeon Lake Regional School serves secondary grades.
