= Co-operative Commonwealth Federation candidates in the 1945 Canadian federal election =

The Cooperative Commonwealth Federation (CCF) ran 205 candidates in the 1945 federal election, of whom 28 were elected. Many of the party's candidates have their own biography pages; information about others may be found here.

== Alberta ==
=== Vegreville: Michael Tomyn ===
Michael Tomyn was a teacher, historian, writer and municipal politician. He was the mayor of Mundare in the 1950s, when it was officially upgraded from a town to a village. He received 1,668 votes (9.87%) in 1945, finishing fourth against Social Credit incumbent Anthony Hlynka.

=== Wetaskiwin: William Albert Stevens ===
William Albert Stevens was a farmer.

The Canadian Parliamentary Guide lists a "W. Stevens" as having contested the 1935 provincial election in Wetaskiwin as a candidate of the CCF-affiliated United Farmers of Alberta. For the purposes of this biography, it is assumed that this is the same person. Also, the CCF candidate for Wetaskiwin in the 1949 federal election was a teacher named "Wilbert A. Stevens". It is assumed that this is either a relative of William Albert Stevens, or that his name was improperly transcribed.

Electoral record
| Election | Division | Party | Votes | % | Place | Winner |
|---|---|---|---|---|---|---|
| 1935 provincial | Wetaskiwin | United Farmers | 506 | | 3/4 | John Wingblade, Social Credit |
| 1945 federal | Wetaskiwin | Cooperative Commonwealth | 3,969 | 21.77 | 2/5 | Norman Jaques, Social Credit |
