= Edmonton—Wetaskiwin =

Federal electoral district in Alberta, Canada

Alberta electoral district
- Edmonton—Wetaskiwin in relation to other Alberta federal electoral districts as of the 2013 Representation Order.

Defunct federal electoral district
- Legislature: House of Commons
- District created: 2013
- District abolished: 2023
- First contested: 2015
- Last contested: 2021
- District webpage: profile, map

Demographics
- Population (2021): 158,749
- Electors (2019): 133,853
- Area (km²): 4,947
- Census division: Division No. 11
- Census subdivision(s): Beaumont, Devon, Edmonton, Leduc, Leduc County, Millet, Wetaskiwin, Wetaskiwin No. 10

Edmonton—Wetaskiwin is a former federal electoral district in Alberta, Canada, that was represented in the House of Commons of Canada from 2015 to 2025.

Edmonton—Wetaskiwin was created by the 2012 federal electoral boundaries redistribution and was legally defined in the 2013 representation order. It came into effect upon the call of the 42nd Canadian federal election, scheduled for 19 October 2015. It was created out of the bulk of Edmonton—Mill Woods—Beaumont, as well as parts of Edmonton—Leduc, Wetaskiwin, and Vegreville—Wainwright.

According to the 2021 census, Edmonton—Wetaskiwin is the most populated riding in Canada, with almost 100,000 residents more than the national average of 109,444. Its population grew at a rate of 89.28% since the 2011 census (on which the 2013 representation order was based).

Under the 2022 Canadian federal electoral redistribution the riding was replaced by Leduc—Wetaskiwin.

== Demographics ==
According to the 2016 Canadian census

- Languages: (2016) 76.2% English, 3.0% Tagalog, 2.8% Punjabi, 2.0% French, 1.6% Mandarin, 1.5% German, 1.1% Spanish, 1.1% Cantonese, 1.0% Urdu, 0.9% Gujarati, 0.9% Korean, 0.8% Hindi, 0.6% Arabic

Panethnic groups in Edmonton—Wetaskiwin (2011−2021)
Panethnic group	2021		2016		2011	
Panethnic group	Pop.	%	Pop.	%	Pop.	%
European (Note: Statistic includes all persons that did not make up part of a visible minority or an indigenous identity.)	120,025	57.9%	106,890	68.16%	86,640	79.1%
South Asian	30,570	14.75%	15,440	9.85%	5,395	4.93%
Southeast Asian (Note: Statistic includes total responses of "Filipino" and "Southeast Asian" under visible minority section on census.)	16,080	7.76%	9,205	5.87%	4,345	3.97%
Indigenous	11,170	5.39%	8,395	5.35%	6,135	5.6%
East Asian (Note: Statistic includes total responses of "Chinese", "Korean", and "Japanese" under visible minority section on census.)	11,140	5.37%	7,275	4.64%	3,235	2.95%
African	9,165	4.42%	4,645	2.96%	1,485	1.36%
Middle Eastern (Note: Statistic includes total responses of "West Asian" and "Arab" under visible minority section on census.)	3,330	1.61%	1,690	1.08%	870	0.79%
Latin American	3,160	1.52%	1,860	1.19%	755	0.69%
Other/Multiracial (Note: Statistic includes total responses of "Visible minority, n.i.e." and "Multiple visible minorities" under visible minority section on census.)	2,635	1.27%	1,435	0.92%	660	0.6%
Total responses	207,290	98.98%	156,830	98.79%	109,530	98.99%
Total population	209,431	100%	158,749	100%	110,644	100%
Notes: Totals greater than 100% due to multiple origin responses. Demographics based on 2012 Canadian federal electoral redistribution riding boundaries.

== Members of Parliament ==
This riding has elected the following members of the House of Commons of Canada:

Parliament	Years	Member	Party
Edmonton—Wetaskiwin; Riding created from Edmonton—Leduc, Edmonton—Mill Woods—Beaumont, Vegreville—Wainwright and Wetaskiwin
42nd	2015–2019	Mike Lake	Conservative
43rd	2019–2021	Mike Lake	Conservative
44th	2021–2025	Mike Lake	Conservative
Riding dissolved into Edmonton Gateway, Edmonton Riverbend, Edmonton Southeast, and Leduc—Wetaskiwin

== Election results ==
View source data.
Graph of election results in Edmonton—Wetawaskin (minor parties that never got 2% of the vote or didn't run consistently are omitted)

2021 Canadian federal election
Party	Candidate	Votes	%	±%	Expenditures
Conservative	Mike Lake	48,340	55.66	–16.77	$66,481.76
New Democratic	Hugo Charles	18,259	21.03	+9.80	$6,933.72
Liberal	Ron Thiering	12,229	14.08	+1.73	$5,253.34
People's	Tyler Beauchamp	7,670	8.83	+6.98	$7,473.41
Veterans Coalition	Travis Calliou	345	0.40	+0.16	none listed
Total valid votes/expense limit		86,843	99.34	–	$152,378.46
Total rejected ballots		576	0.66	+0.21	
Turnout		87,419	65.34	–4.91	
Eligible voters		133,800			
Conservative hold		Swing		–13.28	
Source: Elections Canada

2019 Canadian federal election
Party	Candidate	Votes	%	±%	Expenditures
Conservative	Mike Lake	63,346	72.43	+6.66	$64,939.94
Liberal	Richard Wong	10,802	12.35	–9.10	$7,055.34
New Democratic	Noah Garver	9,820	11.23	+1.51	$991.32
Green	Emily Drzymala	1,660	1.90	–0.44	none listed
People's	Neil Doell	1,616	1.85	–	$4,865.57
Veterans Coalition	Travis Calliou	211	0.24	–	none listed
Total valid votes/expense limit		87,455	99.55	–	$141,135.37
Total rejected ballots		392	0.45	+0.16	
Turnout		87,847	70.25	+2.30	
Eligible voters		125,054			
Conservative hold		Swing		+7.84	
Source: Elections Canada

2015 Canadian federal election
Party	Candidate	Votes	%	±%	Expenditures
Conservative	Mike Lake	44,949	65.77	–9.80	$108,058.16
Liberal	Jacqueline Biollo	14,660	21.45	+15.73	$14,667.90
New Democratic	Fritz K. Bitz	6,645	9.72	–4.55	$12,140.06
Green	Joy-Ann Hut	1,595	2.33	–1.76	$1,420.42
Libertarian	Brayden Whitlock	495	0.72	–	none listed
Total valid votes/expense limit		68,344	99.71	–	$243,641.10
Total rejected ballots		197	0.29	–	
Turnout		68,541	67.95	–	
Eligible voters		100,871			
Conservative hold		Swing		–12.76	
Source: Elections Canada

2011 federal election redistributed results
Party	Vote	%
Conservative	31,194	75.57
New Democratic	5,891	14.27
Liberal	2,363	5.72
Green	1,690	4.09
Others	143	0.35

== See also ==
- List of Canadian electoral districts
- Historical federal electoral districts of Canada
