= Alberta Highway 814 =

Highway in Alberta, Canada

Highway 814

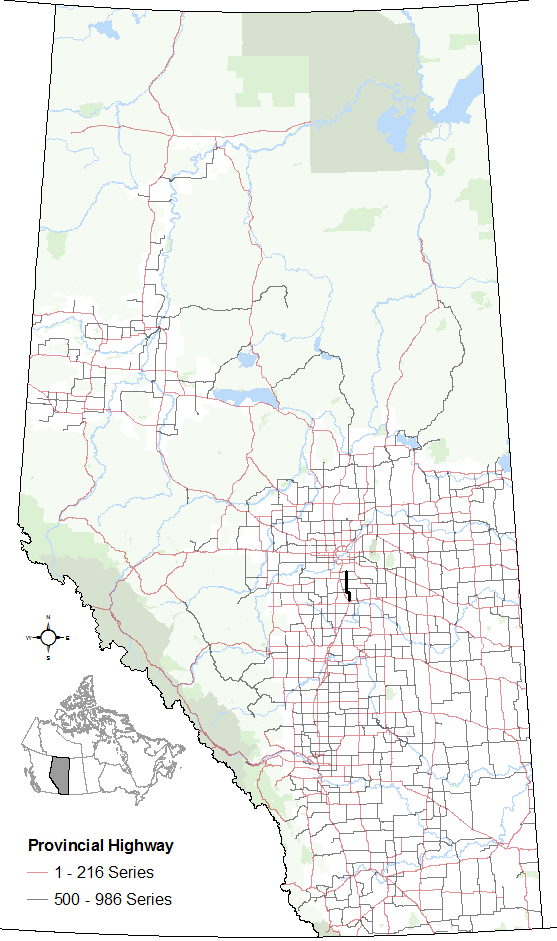

Route information
- Maintained by Alberta Transportation
- Length: 41.32 km (25.68 mi)

Major junctions
- South end: Highway 13 in Wetaskiwin
- North end: Highway 625 in Beaumont

Location
- Country: Canada
- Province: Alberta
- Specialized and rural municipalities: County of Wetaskiwin No. 10, Leduc County
- Major cities: Beaumont, Wetaskiwin

Highway system
- Alberta Provincial Highway Network; List; Former
← Highway 813	→ Highway 815

Highway 814 is a highway in the province of Alberta, Canada; it runs south–north from Highway 13 in Wetaskiwin to Highway 625 in Beaumont. This highway used to extend to Edmonton limits, until the Beaumont government took control of the road. This extension is the most direct link between Edmonton and the suburb of Beaumont. This route is also known as 47 Street in Wetaskiwin, and 50 Street in Beaumont and Edmonton.

== Major intersections ==
Starting from the south end of Highway 814:

Location	km	mi	Destinations	Notes
Wetaskiwin	−3.2	−2.0	40 Avenue (Highway 613)	As 47 Street
Wetaskiwin	0.0	0.0	Highway 13 – Gwynne, Camrose	Highway 814 southern terminus
County of Wetaskiwin No. 10	11.3	7.0	Township Road 475 north / Range Road 240 east	Highway 814 branches west
County of Wetaskiwin No. 10	14.6	9.1	Range Road 242 south / Township Road 475 west – Millet	Highway 814 branches north
Leduc County	19.5	12.1	Highway 616 – Millet, Armena	
Leduc County	32.4	20.1	Highway 623 – Leduc, Rolly View	
Leduc County	38.9	24.2	Airport Road (Township Road 502) – Nisku	To Edmonton International Airport
Beaumont	42.1	26.2	Highway 625 – Nisku	Highway 814 northern terminus; becomes 50 Street
Edmonton	53.0	32.9	Anthony Henday Drive (Highway 216) 50 Street	Interchange; Highway 216 exit 73; 50 Street continues north
1.000 mi = 1.609 km; 1.000 km = 0.621 mi: Closed/former

== See also ==
- Transportation in Edmonton
