= James Stanley Speakman =

Canadian politician from Alberta (1906–1962)

Captain James Stanley Speakman (20 October 1906, Penhold, Alberta – 30 April 1962) served as a Canadian federal politician (MP) from 1958 to 1962. He was an accountant, farmer and Canadian Expeditionary Force officer during World War II.

Speakman ran for a seat in the House of Commons of Canada in the 1957 Canadian federal election. In that election he ran as a Progressive Conservative candidate in the Wetaskiwin electoral district. He was defeated by incumbent Member of Parliament Ray Thomas.

Parliament was dissolved a year later, forcing the 1958 Canadian federal election, Speakman ran against Thomas again. He defeated him in a landslide to capture the seat.

Speakman retired at the end of his term in 1962 due to failing health. He died 11 days after retiring from public office on April 30, 1962.

Parliament of Canada
Preceded by Ray Thomas	Member of Parliament Wetaskiwin; 1958-1962	Succeeded by Harry Andrew Moore
