= Chartier (restaurant) =

French Canadian restaurant in Alberta

Coordinates: 53°21′13″N 113°24′56″W

Chartier is a French Canadian restaurant in Beaumont, Alberta.

== History ==
Chartier opened in 2016 after its owners, Darren and Sylvia Cheverie, conducted a successful Kickstarter campaign in which more than 500 donors collectively contributed more than $100,000. Its first head chef was Steve Brochu. It received very positive early coverage and was among the 30 restaurants named to Air Canada's Best New Restaurants longlist in 2017. The restaurant also begun to host many events, including fundraisers and dinners that showcased products of local farmers.

Brochu left as head chef in 2019 to found his own restaurant, MilkCrate, at the Citadel Theatre. In 2021, the restaurant was featured on the Food Network Canada show Big Food Bucket List with John Catucci.

In August 2023, it was announced that Chartier was going to close. Less than a month later, the restaurant announced that a large investment from a community member would allow it to continue operating following a temporary closure in October 2023. In April 2024, Chartier was one of several Beaumont businesses damaged by a vandal, who smashed panes of glass and spray-painted the exterior.
