= Harry Andrew Moore =

Canadian politician

- Official 1968 portrait

Member of the Canadian Parliament for Wetaskiwin
- In office 1962–1972
- Preceded by: Ray Thomas
- Succeeded by: Stanley K. Schellenberger

Personal details
- Born: February 21, 1914 Wetaskiwin, Alberta, Canada
- Died: July 3, 1998 (aged 84) Wetaskiwin, Alberta, Canada
- Party: Progressive Conservative Party of Canada

Harry Andrew Moore (February 21, 1914 – July 3, 1998) was a dairy farmer and Canadian member of Parliament from 1962 to 1972.

== Political career ==
Moore first ran for a seat in the House of Commons of Canada in the 1962 federal election. He defeated a field of 3 candidates by comfortable margin to win the Wetaskiwin electoral district. Parliament would be dissolved a year later when the minority Progressive Conservative government fell. This forced the 1963 federal election. Moore increased his vote total, easily winning re-election. Moore ran for a third term in office in the 1965 federal election winning a third term with a slightly reduced plurality.

Moore would win the largest plurality of his career running for office for his fourth and final term in the 1968 federal election. He retired from federal politics in 1972.

During his time in parliament he was on the Standing Committee on Agriculture and Defense.

== Personal life ==
Moore married Edna Joy Gilbert (February 19, 1923 Wainwright, Alberta - September 25, 1995 Wetaskiwin, Alberta) on July 23, 1941. They have three children: William (Bill), Rodney and Laurel (Laurie). He died at Wetaskiwin in 1998.
