= Leduc—Wetaskiwin =

Federal electoral district in Alberta, Canada

Alberta electoral district
- Interactive map of riding boundaries from the 2025 federal election

Federal electoral district
- Legislature: House of Commons
MP
Mike Lake
Conservative
- District created: 2023
- First contested: 2025

Demographics
- Population (2021): 114,237
- Electors (2025): 87,394
- Area (km²): 6,063
- Pop. density (per km²): 18.8
- Census division(s): Division No. 8, Division No. 11
- Census subdivision(s): Leduc, Beaumont, Leduc County, Wetaskiwin, Wetaskiwin County, Ponoka County (part), Devon, Samson, Ermineskin, Calmar

Leduc—Wetaskiwin is a federal electoral district in Alberta, Canada. It came into effect upon the call of the 2025 Canadian federal election.

== Geography ==
Under the 2022 Canadian federal electoral redistribution the riding will be created from the rural areas of Edmonton—Wetaskiwin, as well as the entirety of Leduc County (including Warburg and Thorsby), and all of the Indian Reserves between Wetaskiwin and Ponoka.

== Demographics ==
According to the 2021 Canadian census

Languages: 88.9% English, 2.2% French, 1.7% Tagalog, 1.4% German, 1.1% Cree, 1.1% Punjabi

Religions: 48.5% Christian (17.4% Catholic, 4.2% United Church, 4.0% Lutheran, 2.3% Anglican, 1.9% Baptist, 1.7% Pentecostal, 17.1% Other), 43.9% No religion, 3.9% Traditional Indigenous spirituality, 1.3% Sikh

Median income: $44,400 (2020)

Average income: $57,500 (2020)

Panethnic groups in Leduc—Wetaskiwin (2021)
Panethnic group	2021	
Panethnic group	Pop.	%
European (Note: Statistic includes all persons that did not make up part of a visible minority or an indigenous identity.)	85,850	76.08%
Indigenous	15,810	14.01%
Southeast Asian (Note: Statistic includes total responses of "Filipino" and "Southeast Asian" under visible minority section on census.)	4,105	3.64%
South Asian	2,945	2.61%
African	1,490	1.32%
East Asian (Note: Statistic includes total responses of "Chinese", "Korean", and "Japanese" under visible minority section on census.)	840	0.74%
Middle Eastern (Note: Statistic includes total responses of "West Asian" and "Arab" under visible minority section on census.)	480	0.43%
Latin American	750	0.66%
Other/multiracial (Note: Statistic includes total responses of "Visible minority, n.i.e." and "Multiple visible minorities" under visible minority section on census.)	575	0.51%
Total responses	112,840	98.77%
Total population	114,240	100%
Notes: Totals greater than 100% due to multiple origin responses. Demographics based on 2022 Canadian federal electoral redistribution riding boundaries.

== History ==
Parliament	Years	Member	Party
Leduc—Wetaskiwin; Riding created from Battle River—Crowfoot, Edmonton—Wetaskiwin, Red Deer—Lacombe, and Yellowhead
45th	2025–present	Mike Lake	Conservative

== Electoral results ==
2025 Canadian federal election
Party	Candidate	Votes	%	±%	Expenditures
Conservative	Mike Lake	47,947	74.73	+11.36	$78,773.56
Liberal	Ronald Brochu	11,136	17.36	+10.26	none listed
New Democratic	Katherine Swampy	3,927	6.12	–11.48	$1,884.42
People's	Jose Flores	688	1.07	–10.13	none listed
United	Kirk Cayer	318	0.50	–	none listed
Canadian Future	Christopher Everingham	145	0.23	–	$3,090.35
Total valid votes/expense limit		64,161	99.47	–	$134,133.97
Total rejected ballots		341	0.53	–	
Turnout		64,502	71.44	–	
Eligible voters		90,284			
Conservative notional hold		Swing		+0.55	
Source: Elections Canada

2021 federal election redistributed results
Party	Vote	%
Conservative	34,770	63.37
New Democratic	9,658	17.60
People's	6,147	11.20
Liberal	3,896	7.10
Green	9	0.02
Others	391	0.71
