= Mike Lake (politician) =

Canadian politician (born 1969)

The Honourable Mike Lake PC MP
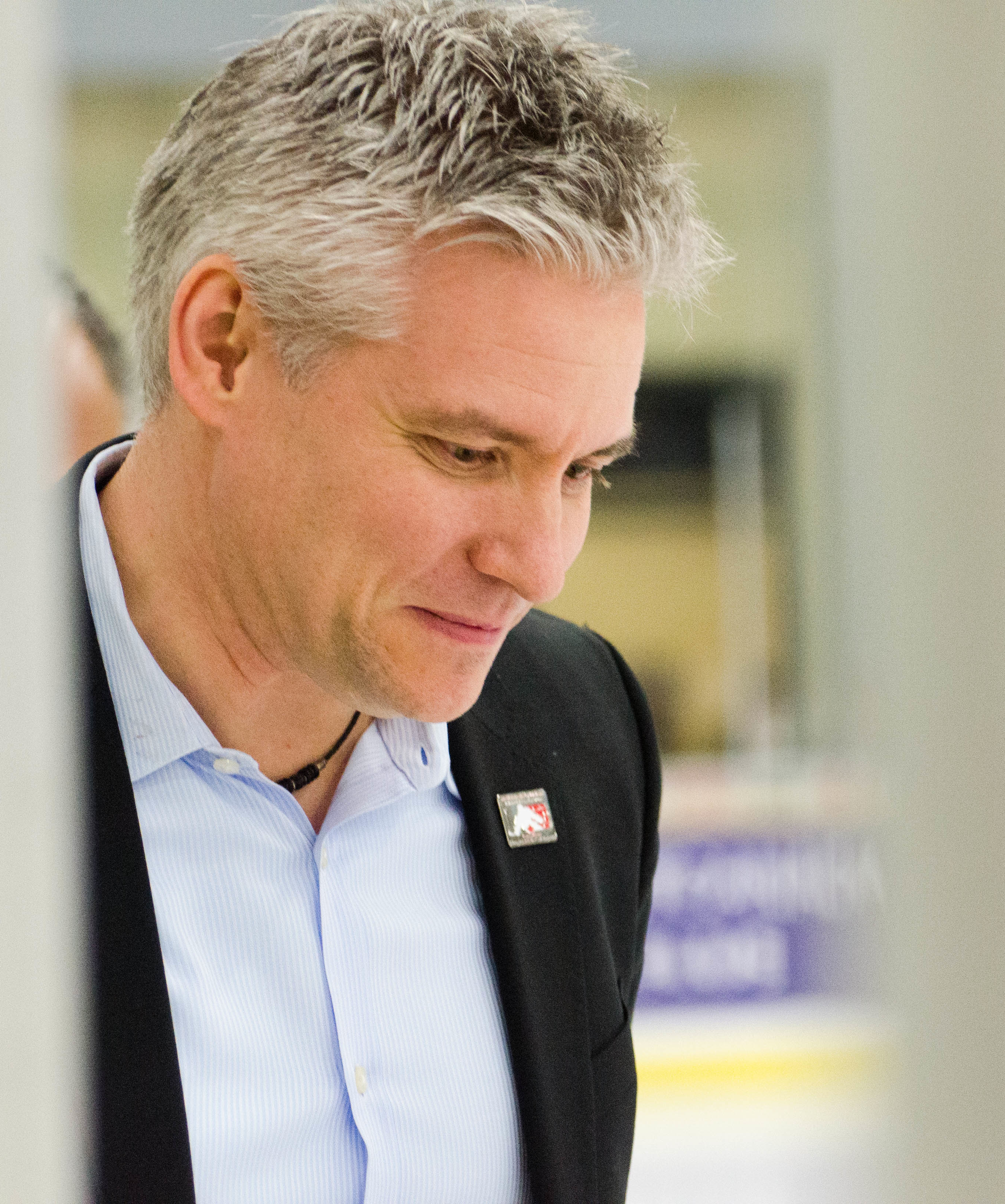
- Lake in 2015

Member of Parliament for Leduc—Wetaskiwin Edmonton—Wetaskiwin (2015–2025) Edmonton—Mill Woods—Beaumont (2006–2015)
- Incumbent
- Assumed office January 23, 2006
- Preceded by: David Kilgour

Parliamentary Secretary to the Minister of Industry
- In office November 7, 2008 – August 2, 2015
- Prime Minister: Stephen Harper
- Minister: Tony Clement; Christian Paradis; James Morre
- Preceded by: Colin Carrie
- Succeeded by: Greg Fergus

Personal details
- Born: Michael Stanley Lake; June 4, 1969 (age 57) New Westminster, British Columbia
- Party: Conservative
- Profession: Businessman, sports executive

Michael Stanley Lake PC MP (born June 4, 1969) is a Canadian politician, businessman, and sports executive in Alberta, Canada who represented the riding of Edmonton—Mill Woods—Beaumont from 2006 to 2015 and Edmonton—Wetaskiwin from 2015 to 2025, he has represented the riding of Leduc—Wetaskiwin since 2025. He is a member of the Conservative Party of Canada and served as Parliamentary Secretary to the Minister of Industry under Prime Minister Stephen Harper.

== Early and personal life ==
Lake was born in New Westminster, British Columbia. He grew up in Devon, Alberta, and obtained a Bachelor of Commerce degree from the University of Alberta. After graduating from university, he began a career with the Edmonton Oilers ice hockey team as a sales manager and director of ticket sales as their national accounts manager.

He has two children, his son is autistic and as a result he is a longtime member of the Edmonton Autism Society. He is involved in the Alberta Foster Care Program.

Lake has regularly held breakfasts to raise funds for autism research.

At the time of the 2025 Canadian federal election, he lived in Leduc County.

== Federal politics ==
Lake won the Conservative Party of Canada nomination for the riding of Edmonton—Mill Woods—Beaumont defeating seven-time candidate Tim Uppal. The nomination proved to be significant since popular long time Liberal incumbent David Kilgour had chosen to retire, creating a power vacuum in the riding.

Lake went on to win the vacant riding in a landslide victory in the 2006 federal election. Pundits had predicted the race would be closer as the Liberal Party of Canada had held the district and its predecessor ridings since 1991.

In his first term as a representative in the House of Commons of Canada, Lake was presented with a very unusual petition signed by almost 500 individuals calling for Bigfoot to be protected under the Species at Risk Act. Lake filed the petition with the Clerk of the House of Commons on March 28, 2007. When interviewed, Lake said that he did not believe in Bigfoot, but filed the petition as a service to constituents without making any judgment call.

The 2015 federal election saw Lake's previous district eliminated in the 2012 federal electoral redistribution. Lake ran for election as a Member of Parliament in the Edmonton—Wetaskiwin electoral district, winning with 65.7% of the votes.

After the resignation of Stephen Harper as leader of the Conservatives, now the Official Opposition, Lake announced that he would run for the interim leadership. The race was eventually won by Rona Ambrose. He was re-elected in the 2019 and 2021 federal elections.

The 2025 federal election saw Lake's previous district eliminated in the 2022 federal electoral redistribution. Lake ran for election as a Member of Parliament in Leduc—Wetaskiwin, winning re-election.

== Electoral record ==
2025 Canadian federal election: Leduc—Wetaskiwin
** Preliminary results — Not yet official **
Party	Candidate	Votes	%	±%	Expenditures
Conservative	Mike Lake	47,947	74.7		
Liberal	Ronald Brochu	11,136	17.4		
New Democratic	Katherine Swampy	3,927	6.1		
People's	Jose Flores	688	1.1		
United	Kirk Cayer	318	0.5		
Canadian Future	Christopher Everingham	145	0.2		
Total valid votes/expense limit					
Total rejected ballots					
Turnout					
Eligible voters					
Source: Elections Canada

2021 Canadian federal election: Edmonton—Wetaskiwin
Party	Candidate	Votes	%	±%	Expenditures
Conservative	Mike Lake	48,340	55.66	–16.77	$66,481.76
New Democratic	Hugo Charles	18,259	21.03	+9.80	$6,933.72
Liberal	Ron Thiering	12,229	14.08	+1.73	$5,253.34
People's	Tyler Beauchamp	7,670	8.83	+6.98	$7,473.41
Veterans Coalition	Travis Calliou	345	0.40	+0.16	none listed
Total valid votes/expense limit		86,843	99.34	–	$152,378.46
Total rejected ballots		576	0.66	+0.21	
Turnout		87,419	65.34	–4.91	
Eligible voters		133,800			
Conservative hold		Swing		–13.28	
Source: Elections Canada

2019 Canadian federal election: Edmonton—Wetaskiwin
Party	Candidate	Votes	%	±%	Expenditures
Conservative	Mike Lake	63,346	72.43	+6.66	$64,939.94
Liberal	Richard Wong	10,802	12.35	–9.10	$7,055.34
New Democratic	Noah Garver	9,820	11.23	+1.51	$991.32
Green	Emily Drzymala	1,660	1.90	–0.44	none listed
People's	Neil Doell	1,616	1.85	–	$4,865.57
Veterans Coalition	Travis Calliou	211	0.24	–	none listed
Total valid votes/expense limit		87,455	99.55	–	$141,135.37
Total rejected ballots		392	0.45	+0.16	
Turnout		87,847	70.25	+2.30	
Eligible voters		125,054			
Conservative hold		Swing		+7.84	
Source: Elections Canada

2015 Canadian federal election: Edmonton—Wetaskiwin
Party	Candidate	Votes	%	±%	Expenditures
Conservative	Mike Lake	44,949	65.77	–9.80	$108,058.16
Liberal	Jacqueline Biollo	14,660	21.45	+15.73	$14,667.90
New Democratic	Fritz K. Bitz	6,645	9.72	–4.55	$12,140.06
Green	Joy-Ann Hut	1,595	2.33	–1.76	$1,420.42
Libertarian	Brayden Whitlock	495	0.72	–	none listed
Total valid votes/expense limit		68,344	99.71	–	$243,641.10
Total rejected ballots		197	0.29	–	
Turnout		68,541	67.95	–	
Eligible voters		100,871			
Conservative hold		Swing		–12.76	
Source: Elections Canada

2011 Canadian federal election: Edmonton—Mill Woods—Beaumont
Party	Candidate	Votes	%	±%	Expenditures
Conservative	Mike Lake	27,857	61.04	+0.72	$42,070.01
New Democratic	Nadine Bailey	10,875	23.83	+8.71	$11,017.12
Liberal	Mike Butler	5,066	11.10	–7.40	none listed
Green	Christa Baxter	1,364	2.99	–2.69	$1,704.56
Pirate	Brent Schaffrick	374	0.82	–	$2,461.30
Communist	Naomi Rankin	100	0.22	–0.16	$562.41
Total valid votes/expense limit		45,636	99.58	–	$91,339.55
Total rejected ballots		191	0.42	+0.07	
Turnout		45,827	52.96	+0.87	
Eligible voters		86,529			
Conservative hold		Swing		+4.00	
Source: Elections Canada

2008 Canadian federal election: Edmonton—Mill Woods—Beaumont
Party	Candidate	Votes	%	±%	Expenditures
Conservative	Mike Lake	25,130	60.32	+1.70	$76,071.93
Liberal	Indira Saroya	7,709	18.51	–2.64	$82,847.55
New Democratic	Mike Butler	6,297	15.12	+0.57	$3,695.19
Green	David Allan Hrushka	2,366	5.68	+1.21	none listed
Communist	Naomi Rankin	157	0.38	+0.19	$395.12
Total valid votes/expense limit		41,659	99.65	–	$84,984.09
Total rejected ballots		146	0.35	+0.07	
Turnout		41,805	52.09	–9.79	
Eligible voters		80,250			
Conservative hold		Swing		+2.17	
Source: Elections Canada

2006 Canadian federal election: Edmonton—Mill Woods—Beaumont
Party	Candidate	Votes	%	±%	Expenditures
Conservative	Mike Lake	27,191	58.62	+16.13	$67,099.78
Liberal	Amarjit Grewal	9,809	21.15	–21.67	$70,370.07
New Democratic	Neal Gray	6,749	14.55	+4.85	$10,296.90
Green	Kate Harrington	2,073	4.47	–0.19	$1,280.00
Independent	Kyle McLeod	477	1.03	–	$7,359.65
Communist	Naomi Rankin	85	0.18	–0.15	$279.95
Total valid votes/expense limit		46,384	99.72	–	$76,924.98
Total rejected ballots		131	0.28	–	
Turnout		46,515	61.88	–	
Eligible voters		75,171			
Conservative gain from Liberal		Swing		+18.90	
Source: Elections Canada
