= Beaumont Composite High School =

École Secondaire Beaumont Composite High School

Location
- 5417 - 43 Avenue; Beaumont, Alberta, T4X 1K1; Canada; 53.349°N 113.423°W

Information
- School type: Public
- Founded: 1988
- School board: Black Gold School Division
- Principal: Sean Flanagan
- Grades: 10-12
- Enrollment: 1274
- Language: English (non-immersion students), French (immersion students)
- Colours: Blue, Black & White
- Mascot: Bandit Bob
- Team name: Bandits
- Website: esbchs.blackgold.ca

École Secondaire Beaumont Composite High School, also known as ÉSBCHS, is a senior high school with grades 10-12 in Beaumont, Alberta, Canada. Being a bilingual school, all grades are taught in either French or English. Built in the late 1980s, the school has an atrium; the peaks of its roof cannot be seen from anywhere in town as the school is situated at the bottom of a hill. A brand new wing was opened on February 10, 2022, bringing 10 new classrooms, a new gymnasium, and a new band room to the school, as well as renovations to existing parts of the school. Situated in the south west quadrant of Beaumont, it is the only high school in the town with enrollment of approximately 1070 students. The school offers a variety of CTS courses with fully-furnished labs and classrooms for Automotives, Computer Science, Fabrication, Foods, Photography, Cosmetology and Outdoor Education programs. The school also is equipped with six computer labs and a library. The school has a background of athletic teams which include Volleyball, Basketball, Badminton, Track, Football, Golf, Rugby, Swimming, as well as many others. The school also has a Fine Arts program including Art, Music, and Drama, which often wins regional Drama Festivals.
