= Red Deer—Lacombe =

Defunct federal electoral district in Alberta, Canada

Alberta electoral district
- Red Deer—Lacombe in relation to other Alberta federal electoral districts as of the 2013 Representation Order.

Defunct federal electoral district
- Legislature: House of Commons
- District created: 2013
- District abolished: 2023
- First contested: 2015
- Last contested: 2021
- District webpage: profile, map

Demographics
- Population (2011): 113,693
- Electors (2019): 93,050
- Area (km²): 6,316
- Census division: Division No. 8
- Census subdivision(s): Blackfalds, Lacombe, Lacombe County, Ponoka, Ponoka County, Red Deer, Red Deer County, Rimbey, Samson 137, Sylvan Lake

Red Deer—Lacombe was an electoral district in Alberta from 2015 to 2025. It was created in 2012 from the more urbanized southern portion of Wetaskiwin (51%) and the northern portion of Red Deer (49%).

The riding was originally intended to be named Red Deer—Wolf Creek.

== Demographics ==
Panethnic groups in Red Deer—Lacombe (2011−2021)
Panethnic group	2021		2016		2011	
Panethnic group	Pop.	%	Pop.	%	Pop.	%
European (Note: Statistic includes all persons that did not make up part of a visible minority or an indigenous identity.)	98,435	76.16%	100,565	79.72%	92,915	83.28%
Indigenous	15,955	12.34%	14,420	11.43%	13,110	11.75%
Southeast Asian (Note: Statistic includes total responses of "Filipino" and "Southeast Asian" under visible minority section on census.)	7,590	5.87%	5,375	4.26%	2,185	1.96%
African	1,720	1.33%	1,445	1.15%	580	0.52%
South Asian	1,500	1.16%	975	0.77%	450	0.4%
Latin American	1,395	1.08%	1,230	0.98%	950	0.85%
East Asian (Note: Statistic includes total responses of "Chinese", "Korean", and "Japanese" under visible minority section on census.)	1,245	0.96%	1,255	0.99%	750	0.67%
Middle Eastern (Note: Statistic includes total responses of "West Asian" and "Arab" under visible minority section on census.)	780	0.6%	500	0.4%	325	0.29%
Other/multiracial (Note: Statistic includes total responses of "Visible minority, n.i.e." and "Multiple visible minorities" under visible minority section on census.)	630	0.49%	385	0.31%	315	0.28%
Total responses	129,250	98.23%	126,140	97.95%	111,575	98.14%
Total population	131,575	100%	128,786	100%	113,693	100%
Notes: Totals greater than 100% due to multiple origin responses. Demographics based on 2012 Canadian federal electoral redistribution riding boundaries.

== Members of Parliament ==
This riding has elected the following members of the House of Commons of Canada:

Red Deer—Lacombe
Parliament	Years	Member	Party
Riding created from Red Deer and Wetaskiwin
42nd	2015–2019	Blaine Calkins	Conservative
43rd	2019–2021	Blaine Calkins	Conservative
44th	2021–2025	Blaine Calkins	Conservative
Riding dissolved into Leduc—Wetaskiwin, Ponoka—Didsbury, and Red Deer

== Election results ==
Graph of election results in Red Deer—Lacombe (minor parties that never got 2% of the vote or didn't run consistently are omitted)

2021 Canadian federal election
Party	Candidate	Votes	%	±%	Expenditures
Conservative	Blaine Calkins	39,805	64.22	–15.61	$35,982.66
New Democratic	Tanya Heyden-Kaye	8,806	14.21	+5.29	$4,261.30
People's	Megan Lim	7,893	12.74	+9.10	$4,343.27
Liberal	David Ondieki	3,704	5.98	+0.73	$2,023.58
Maverick	Harry Joujan	986	1.59	–	$925.00
No affiliation	Joan Barnes	573	0.93	–	$9,652.64
Libertarian	Matthew Watson	212	0.34	–	none listed
Total valid votes/expense limit		61,979	99.44	–	$121,470.01
Total rejected ballots		348	0.56	+0.08	
Turnout		62,327	65.22	–6.04	
Eligible voters		95,567			
Conservative hold		Swing		–10.45	
Source: Elections Canada

2019 Canadian federal election
Party	Candidate	Votes	%	±%	Expenditures
Conservative	Blaine Calkins	53,843	79.83	+9.13	$91,036.85
New Democratic	Lauren Pezzella	6,012	8.91	–2.53	$2,301.26
Liberal	Tiffany Rose	3,540	5.25	–9.73	$2,490.31
People's	Laura Lynn Thompson	2,453	3.64	–	none listed
Green	Sarah Palmer	1,596	2.37	–0.51	none listed
Total valid votes/expense limit		67,444	99.52	–	$117,336.29
Total rejected ballots		325	0.48	+0.20	
Turnout		67,769	71.26	+1.85	
Eligible voters		95,095			
Conservative hold		Swing		+5.83	
Source: Elections Canada

2015 Canadian federal election
Party	Candidate	Votes	%	±%	Expenditures
Conservative	Blaine Calkins	43,599	70.71	–6.72	$74,901.25
Liberal	Jeff Rock	9,235	14.98	+11.41	$16,605.92
New Democratic	Doug Hart	7,055	11.44	–2.85	$5,541.40
Green	Les Kuzyk	1,773	2.88	–1.84	none listed
Total valid votes/expense limit		61,662	99.72	–	$224,841.10
Total rejected ballots		176	0.28	–	
Turnout		61,838	69.41	–	
Eligible voters		89,092			
Conservative hold		Swing		–9.07	
Source: Elections Canada

2011 federal election redistributed results
Party	Vote	%
Conservative	31,453	77.43
New Democratic	5,805	14.29
Green	1,917	4.72
Liberal	1,448	3.56

== See also ==
- List of Canadian electoral districts
- Historical federal electoral districts of Canada
