= Marc Magnan =

Canadian ice hockey player

- Born: February 17, 1962 (age 64) Beaumont, Alberta, Canada
- Height: 5 ft 11 in (180 cm)
- Weight: 195 lb (88 kg; 13 st 13 lb)
- Position: Left wing
- Shot: Left
- Played for: Toronto Maple Leafs
- NHL draft: 195th overall, 1981; Toronto Maple Leafs
- Playing career: 1982–1988

Marc Magnan (born February 17, 1962) is a Canadian retired ice hockey player who played four games in the National Hockey League for the Toronto Maple Leafs during the 1982–83 season. The rest of his career, which lasted from 1982 to 1988, was spent in the minor leagues.

Magnan was born in Beaumont, Alberta. He played his junior ice hockey with the Lethbridge Broncos. After finishing his junior hockey in 1982, he joined the Maple Leafs organization and played for their minor league St. Catharines Saints team. He was called up for four game with Toronto that season, which turned out to be his only time in the NHL. He returned to the minor leagues and played five more seasons.

== Career statistics ==
=== Regular season and playoffs ===
			Regular season					Playoffs
Season	Team	League	GP	G	A	Pts	PIM	GP	G	A	Pts	PIM
1978–79	St. Albert Saints	AJHL	58	11	24	35	195	—	—	—	—	—
1979–80	St. Albert Saints	AJHL	42	14	23	37	178	—	—	—	—	—
1979–80	Lethbridge Broncos	WHL	1	0	1	1	0	—	—	—	—	—
1980–81	Lethbridge Broncos	WHL	66	16	30	46	284	9	4	1	5	78
1981–82	Lethbridge Broncos	WHL	64	33	38	71	406	12	10	5	15	60
1982–83	Toronto Maple Leafs	NHL	4	0	1	1	5	—	—	—	—	—
1982–83	St. Catharines Saints	AHL	67	6	10	16	229	—	—	—	—	—
1983–84	Muskegon Mohawks	IHL	19	3	10	13	30	—	—	—	—	—
1983–84	St. Catharines Saints	AHL	54	3	6	9	170	—	—	—	—	—
1984–85	Indianapolis Checkers	IHL	72	9	24	33	244	7	1	3	4	13
1985–86	Indianapolis Checkers	IHL	69	15	22	37	279	5	0	1	1	48
1986–87	Indianapolis Checkers	IHL	77	11	21	32	353	6	0	0	0	22
1987–88	Flint Spirits	IHL	11	0	2	2	50	—	—	—	—	—
IHL totals			248	38	79	117	956	18	1	4	5	83
NHL totals			4	0	1	1	5	—	—	—	—	—
