= Dale Johnston (politician) =

Canadian politician

Member of Parliament for Wetaskiwin
- In office 1993–2005
- Preceded by: Willie Littlechild
- Succeeded by: Blaine Calkins

Personal details
- Born: F. Dale Johnston; 14 November 1941 (age 84) Ponoka, Alberta, Canada
- Party: Conservative (2004-)
- Other political affiliations: Reform (1993-2000); Canadian Alliance (2000-2004)
- Parent: Glen Johnston (father)

F. Dale Johnston (born November 14, 1941, in Ponoka, Alberta) is a former Canadian politician. He began his career in politics in 1986 as a councillor in Ponoka, and he then became reeve in 1989. In 1993 Canadian federal election, he was elected into the House of Commons of Canada. He was elected as a member of the Reform Party of Canada in the riding of Wetaskiwin. He was re-elected in the 1997 Canadian federal election, and in the 2000 Canadian federal election (as a member of the Canadian Alliance) and again in the 2004 Canadian federal election (as a member of the Conservative Party of Canada). A farmer, he served as Chief Opposition Whip and Whip of the Conservative Party from 2002 to 2004 and twice more in 2004. He has also been the Opposition critic to the Minister of Labour and to Parliamentary Affairs. Johnston retired from parliament at its dissolution prior to the 2006 federal election.

Johnston's father, Glen Johnston, served as the member for Ponoka in the Legislative Assembly of Alberta from 1952 to 1967.

Parliament of Canada
Preceded by Willie Littlechild	Member of Parliament Wetaskiwin; 1993-2005	Succeeded by Blaine Calkins
