= William Irvine (Canadian politician) =

Canadian politician, journalist, and clergyman (1885–1962)

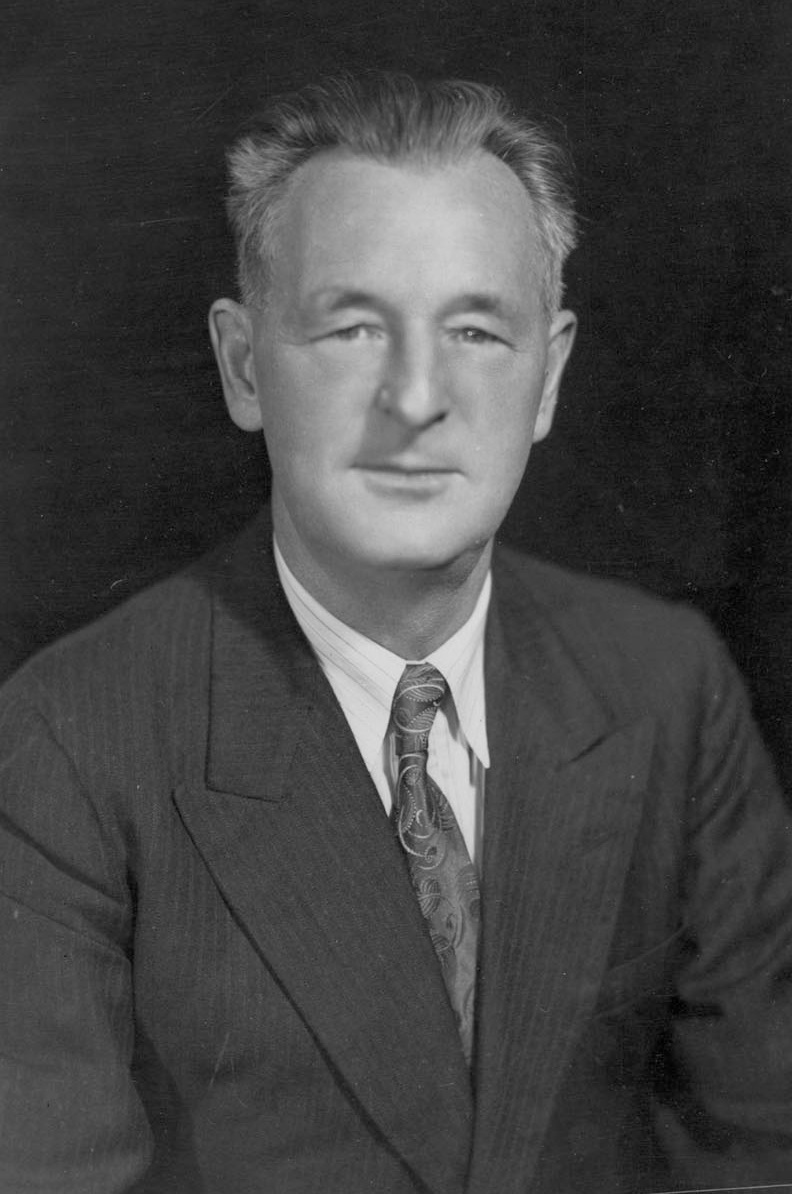
William Irvine

William Irvine (April 19, 1885 – October 26, 1962) was a Canadian politician, journalist, and clergyman. He served three terms in the House of Commons of Canada, representing Labour, the United Farmers of Alberta, and the Co-operative Commonwealth Federation. During the 1920s, he was an active member of the Ginger Group, a grouping of radical Members of Parliament (MPs).

== Early life ==
Irvine was born at Gletness, Shetland, Scotland, as one of twelve children in a working-class family. He became a Christian socialist in his youth and worked as a Methodist lay preacher. He moved to Canada in 1907 after being recruited for ministerial work by James Woodsworth, the father of future CCF leader J. S. Woodsworth.

== Political involvement ==
Irvine was a follower of the Social Gospel and rejected biblical literalism. He refused to sign the Articles of Faith when ordained as a Methodist minister, claiming that he accepted the ethical but not the supernatural aspects of Christian belief. He was nonetheless accepted into the ministry and was stationed at Emo, Ontario, in 1914. Irvine was accused of heresy the following year by a church elder and, although acquitted of the charge, chose to resign his commission. He left the Methodists and accepted a call to lead the Unitarian Church in Calgary, Alberta, in early 1916.

In addition to his work as a Unitarian minister, Irvine became politically active after moving to Alberta. He helped establish an Alberta branch of the radical agrarian Non-Partisan League (NPL) in December 1916. Irvine was an NPL representative at the creation of the Alberta Labor Representation League (LRL) in April 1917.

Irvine founded the Nutcracker newspaper in 1916 and oversaw its later transformations into the Alberta Non-Partisan and the Western Independent.

Irvine ran as an Labor Representation League candidate in the 1917 provincial election in Calgary, but was unsuccessful.

Irvine campaigned for the House of Commons of Canada in 1917 as a Labour candidate, opposing Robert Borden's Unionist government during the Conscription Crisis election of that year. His platform overlapped with that of the Alberta Non-Partisan League. While not a pacifist, he denounced war profiteering and called for the "conscription of wealth" rather than of men. He was accused of holding pro-German sympathies but was defeated in the election; following the loss, he also lost financial support from the American Unitarian Association in Boston.

Despite this setback, Irvine retained the support of his local congregation and, in 1919, established his own "People's Church" in Calgary as part of the Labour church movement.

That same year, he helped establish the Alberta wing of the Dominion Labor Party.

Irvine lived briefly in New Brunswick in 1920, where he supported the province's United Farmers movement during a federal by-election. After returning to Calgary, he helped organize a new leftist political party, the Non-Partisan League, and played a key role in persuading the United Farmers of Alberta (UFA) to engage in direct politics. Irvine's 1920 book, Farmers in Politics, endorsed UFA policies of economic co-operation, group government (a form of proportional representation) and direct political participation of the UFA. The UFA was divided between supporters of direct political action and those, including leader Henry Wise Wood, who favoured remaining an agrarian pressure group. The UFA organized a series of public debates between Irvine and Wood on the issue of direct political engagement. That step was ultimately chosen, although Wood succeeded in limiting UFA membership to farmers.

=== Member of Parliament, 1920s ===
Irvine was elected to the House of Commons in the 1921 federal election as a Dominion Labour Party candidate in Calgary East. Two other Labour MPs were elected in Canada that year - Joseph Shaw (Calgary) and J. S. Woodsworth (Winnipeg North Centre). Irvine became close political and personal friends with Woodsworth.

Irvine and Woodsworth launched a House of Commons committee investigation of social credit. The House of Commons committee invited social credit theorist Major C.H. Douglas, Edmonton farmer/bank reformer George Bevington and others to speak on monetary and bank reform alongside conventional banking experts. Irvine was interested in social credit monetary theories, believing that monetary reform was crucial to realizing a co-operative commonwealth. (Note: Irvine had a low opinion of Aberhart's ideology and political ambitions.) Their investigation of bank reform was particularly significant as it coincided with the collapse of the Home Bank of Canada, which left many families penniless and sparked the first discussions of social credit in Canada. The investigation's findings was published in the Irvine/DLP book, Purchasing power and the world problem: Social control of credit (1924).

Irvine ran for re-election in 1925 but was unsuccessful.

He was next elected in 1926, when he ran as a UFA candidate in the rural Alberta riding of Wetaskiwin. Despite the change in his party affiliation, he remained a leading ally of Woodsworth and of farmer-labour co-operation. He, Woodsworth and many Farmer and Labour MPs formed the "Ginger Group", which pushed and prodded the House of Commons to pass pro-labour and pro-farmer legislation. His book Co-operative Government was published in 1929.

In the late 1920s, Irvine introduced a bill to abolish capital punishment.

He was re-elected in 1930 in the Wetaskiwin riding, receiving 4800 votes, 40 percent of votes cast in the district.

Irvine, Woodsworth and several other farmer and labour MPs met and decided to work to found a national labour-farmer-socialist political party, the Co-operative Commonwealth Federation party. That meeting was held in Irvine's parliamentary office in 1932.

Irvine was active in the founding of the CCF in Calgary in 1932. Irvine served as the first president of the Alberta CCF. He helped bring the UFA into the CCF in early 1933, and the parliamentary UFA caucus into the CCF for the 1935 election.

He and all the other UFA MPs were defeated in the 1935 election, succumbing to Social Credit candidates.

Irvine wrote many books on UFA and CCF policies and plans. This included Co-operative Government (1920); Let us reason together: An appeal to Social Creditors and C.C.F.'ers (1936); The forces of reconstruction: A review of world-conditions under capitalism, and the forces working towards the Co-operative Commonwealth (1934); Co-operation or catastrophe: An Interpretation of the Co-operative Commonwealth Federation and its policy (1934); and Is socialism the answer?: The intelligent man's guide to basic democracy (1945). He also wrote two plays on political and economic reform: You Can't Do That and In Brains We Trust.

In 1936, Irvine attempted to re-enter parliament via a by-election in Assiniboia, Saskatchewan, but was defeated by former Saskatchewan Premier James Garfield Gardiner.

Irvine eventually returned to parliament in the 1945 federal election for the British Columbia riding of Cariboo. He went on to serve in the House of Commons for four years before being defeated in the 1949 election, when the opposition united behind Liberal candidate George Matheson Murray.

Afterwards, Irvine made three more attempts to return to Parliament in the 1950s, but was unsuccessful each time.

== Notes ==
Parliament of Canada
Preceded by Daniel Lee Redman	Member of Parliament for East Calgary; 1921–1925	Succeeded by Fred Davis
Preceded by Stanley Tobin	Member of Parliament for Wetaskiwin; 1926–1935	Succeeded by Norman Jaques
Preceded by James Gray Turgeon	Member of Parliament for Cariboo; 1945–1949	Succeeded by George Matheson Murray
