= Blaine Calkins =

Canadian politician (born 1968)

Blaine Calkins MP

Chief Opposition Whip
- In office February 4, 2022 – September 13, 2022
- Leader: Candice Bergen; Pierre Poilievre
- Preceded by: Blake Richards
- Succeeded by: Kerry-Lynne Findlay

Member of Parliament for Ponoka—Didsbury Red Deer—Lacombe (2015-2025) Wetaskiwin (2006–2015)
- Incumbent
- Assumed office January 23, 2006
- Preceded by: Dale Johnston

Personal details
- Born: December 25, 1968 (age 57) Lacombe, Alberta
- Party: Conservative
- Spouse: Barbara Calkins
- Profession: computer technician, park ranger, college instructor

Blaine F. Calkins MP (born December 25, 1968) is a Conservative member of Parliament in the House of Commons of Canada. He is the current member of Parliament for Ponoka—Didsbury in Alberta, having previously represented the riding of Red Deer—Lacombe from 2015-2025, and Wetaskiwin, from 2006-2015.

He was elected to Parliament for Wetaskiwin in 2006. The riding was abolished in 2015, and Calkins successfully ran in Red Deer—Lacombe, essentially the southern part of his old riding (including its largest city, Lacombe) combined with the northern half of the old Red Deer riding. The riding of Red Deer—Lacombe was itself abolished in 2025 and Calkins successfully ran in the new riding of Ponoka-Didsbury, encompassing much of the previous riding, without the city of Red Deer, but adding a multitude of new rural communities, including the towns of Olds and Didsbury, south of the existing riding.

== Early life and career ==
Calkins was born and raised in the Lacombe, Alberta area. He graduated from the University of Alberta in 1992 with a Bachelor of Science with specialization in zoology. He later became a tenured faculty member at Red Deer College. He began his career in politics as a member of the Lacombe Town Council, and as such has been involved with the board of directors of the Lacombe Municipal Ambulance Society, the board of directors for Family and Community Support Services, The Municipal Planning Commission, David Thompson Tourist Council and the Disaster Services Committee.

Calkins became a member of the Reform Party in 1996, and followed most of the party into the Canadian Alliance in 2000 and the Conservative Party in 2004. He served on the Candidate Nomination Committee for the Reform Party in Wetaskiwin in 1999, and joined the board of directors for the Alliance's riding nomination committee in 2000. Since then, he has held various board positions, including president, vice president and director of communications.

== Political career ==
=== CPC Alberta Caucus chair ===
Calkins served as the chair for the Alberta caucus of the Conservative Party of Canada in both the 41st and 42nd Parliament. As the caucus chair, Blaine was responsible for facilitating dialogue between the Conservative MPs from Alberta the Conservative leadership.

=== Ethics ===
From February 4, 2016 to September 18, 2017, Calkins was the chair of the Standing Committee on Access to Information, Privacy and Ethics. During his time as chair, the committee undertook a review of the Privacy Act, the Access to Information Act, and the Security of Canada Information Sharing Act.

In January 2017, Calkins wrote a letter to then-Ethics Commissioner, Mary Dawson, highlighting a number of concerns he had about a trip Prime Minister Justin Trudeau had accepted to the Bahamas. On December 20, 2017, the Ethics Commissioner released her report, finding Trudeau had violated multiple sections of the Conflict of Interest Act.

=== Conservative Hunting and Angling Caucus ===
Calkins is the current chair of the Conservative Hunting and Angling Caucus.

== Political views ==
=== Support for labourers ===
In the 41st Parliament, Calkins passed a Private Members Bill called the Employees’ Voting Rights Act to make union certification votes down by secret ballot, to help prevent intimidation tactics that have been reported during certification proceedings under the card-check system. The Act also set the threshold to trigger a certification or decertification vote at 45% of bargaining unit members indicating they wish to have a vote, and standardized the secret ballot threshold for the successful creation or continuation of a bargaining agent. While the Employees’ Voting Rights Act passed and became law under the Conservative Government, one of the first acts of the Trudeau Government was to repeal these protections for workers.

=== Rural crime ===
Calkins has been actively working on addressing the rural crime issue in Canada. In Fall of 2017 Calkins co-chaired the CPC Alberta MP Rural Crime Taskforce. This was in partnership with United Conservative Party MLAs who conducted a similar study. The task force met with residents from rural Alberta, including community groups and law enforcement to hear about concerns of residents province-wide and compiled a report making recommendations to the government of Canada to address the issue of rural crime. The report was submitted as a brief to the Standing Committee on Public Safety and Emergency Preparedness during their study on M-167 about rural crime. The Liberals on the committee rejected all of the recommendations, causing the Conservative Members to submit a dissenting report.

Calkins put forward a Private Members Bill, C-458, which seeks to make remoteness an aggravating factor at sentencing, in response to what he called an “insulting” report from the Committee on Public Safety. While the bill was unable to be advanced past first reading in the 42nd Parliament, Calkins committed to reintroducing it if re-elected. Alberta Justice Minister Dough Schweitzer wrote a letter supporting Calkins PMB.

=== Carbon tax ===
According to a December 14, 2018 recording by a Radio-Canada reporter of a talk given by Calkins to students in grades 7 and 8 in Red Deer, Calkins responded to a question about the carbon tax by saying that he was a biologist and that CO_{2} was plant food not pollution. He told students that he understood there was an impact on the environment from burning fossil fuels but he questioned whether burning fossil fuels "caused extreme weather events". Calkins told them, "There's just more people now than there was before. So, when we have a major weather event, more people get affected, because the chances of it affecting people are that much higher."

In a follow-up article on December 18, Conseil Scolaire Centre-Nord's (CSCN) superintendent, Robert Lessard, responded by saying that these comments were Calkins' own personal opinions, whereas in CSCN, they teach facts about the "biological cycle of carbon", and "ecological impacts [of environment on the planet] that need to be taken care of."

Shawn Marshall, who is a University of Calgary Geography professor as well as a Tier II Canada Research Chair in Climate Change, said that Calkins' "half truths" without context, are typical examples of "climate misinformation" used by politicians who oppose the carbon tax, "to paralyze us a little bit". His concern was that they were introduced to junior youth. Marshall said that Calkins failed to add that humans are generating more CO_{2} than plants can take up, and that while we do have a larger population vulnerable to extreme weather events, "there's also this huge overprint of climate change on these extreme weather events."

== Electoral record ==
2025 Canadian federal election: Ponoka—Didsbury
| Party | Candidate | Votes | % | ±% | Expenditures |
|---|---|---|---|---|---|
| Conservative | Blaine Calkins | 56,106 | 81.81 | +13.94 | $38,502.44 |
| New Democratic | Logan Hooley | 7,414 | 10.81 | –0.14 | $831.38 |
| United | Grant Abraham | 2,129 | 3.10 | – | $86,351.67 |
| No affiliation | Zarnab Zafar (Note: Zafar is endorsed by the Liberal Party of Canada, which stated her party affiliation was not registered due to a clerical error with Elections Canada.) | 1,641 | 2.39 | +1.76 | |
| People's | Larry Gratton | 1,289 | 1.88 | –11.48 | $4,011.60 |
| Total valid votes/expense limit | | 68,579 | 99.20 | – | $140,540.79 |
| Total rejected ballots | | 552 | 0.80 | – | |
| Turnout | | 69,131 | 75.13 | – | |
| Eligible voters | | 92,020 | | | |
| Conservative notional hold | | Swing | | +7.04 | |
Source: Elections Canada

2019 Canadian federal election: Red Deer—Lacombe
| Party | Candidate | Votes | % | ±% | Expenditures |
|---|---|---|---|---|---|
| Conservative | Blaine Calkins | 53,843 | 79.83 | +9.13 | $91,036.85 |
| New Democratic | Lauren Pezzella | 6,012 | 8.91 | –2.53 | $2,301.26 |
| Liberal | Tiffany Rose | 3,540 | 5.25 | –9.73 | $2,490.31 |
| People's | Laura Lynn Thompson | 2,453 | 3.64 | – | none listed |
| Green | Sarah Palmer | 1,596 | 2.37 | –0.51 | none listed |
| Total valid votes/expense limit | | 67,444 | 99.52 | – | $117,336.29 |
| Total rejected ballots | | 325 | 0.48 | +0.20 | |
| Turnout | | 67,769 | 71.26 | +1.85 | |
| Eligible voters | | 95,095 | | | |
| Conservative hold | | Swing | | +5.83 | |
Source: Elections Canada

2015 Canadian federal election: Red Deer-Lacombe
| Party | Candidate | Votes | % | ±% | Expenditures |
|---|---|---|---|---|---|
| Conservative | Blaine Calkins | 43,599 | 70.7 | -6.73 | – |
| Liberal | Jeff Rock | 9,235 | 15.0 | +11.44 | – |
| New Democratic | Doug Hart | 7,055 | 11.4 | -2.89 | – |
| Green | Les Kuzyk | 1,773 | 2.9 | -1.82 | – |
| Total valid votes/Expense limit | | 61,662 | 100.0 | | $221,802.13 |
| Total rejected ballots | | 176 | – | – | |
| Turnout | | 61,838 | 71.3% | – | |
| Eligible voters | | 86,609 | | | |
| Conservative hold | | Swing | | -9.08 | |
Source: Elections Canada

2011 Canadian federal election: Wetaskiwin
| Party | Candidate | Votes | % | ±% | Expenditures |
|---|---|---|---|---|---|
| Conservative | Blaine Calkins | 37,756 | 81.44 | +4.31 | $23,700 |
| New Democratic | Tim Robson | 5,281 | 11.39 | +2.77 | $1,718 |
| Green | Robert Johnston | 1,978 | 4.27 | -3.78 | – |
| Liberal | Christopher Anderson | 1,348 | 2.91 | -2.69 | $5,920 |
| Total valid votes/Expense limit | | 46,363 | 100.00 | | |
| Total rejected ballots | | 122 | 0.26 | +0.01 | |
| Turnout | | 46,485 | 58.90 | +5.96 | |
| Eligible voters | | 78,925 | – | – | |

2008 Canadian federal election: Wetaskiwin
| Party | Candidate | Votes | % | ±% | Expenditures |
|---|---|---|---|---|---|
| Conservative | Blaine Calkins | 32,528 | 77.13 | +1.98 | $32,626 |
| New Democratic | Tim Robson | 3,636 | 8.62 | -0.70 | $6,371 |
| Green | Les Parsons | 3,395 | 8.05 | +1.72 | $388 |
| Liberal | Rita Katherine Dillon | 2,362 | 5.60 | -3.58 | $8,762 |
| Canadian Action | Shawn Mann | 249 | 0.59 | – | |
| Total valid votes/Expense limit | | 42,170 | 100.00 | $90,704 | |
| Total rejected ballots | | 105 | – | | |
| Turnout | | 42,275 | 52.94 | | |

2006 Canadian federal election: Wetaskiwin
| Party | Candidate | Votes | % | ±% | Expenditures |
|---|---|---|---|---|---|
| Conservative | Blaine Calkins | 35,776 | 75.15 | +1.6 | $38,612 |
| New Democratic | Jim Graves | 4,441 | 9.32 | +2.1 | |
| Liberal | Peter Crossley | 4,371 | 9.18 | -2.7 | $9,976 |
| Green | Tom Lampman | 3,016 | 6.33 | +0.1 | $500 |
| Total valid votes | | 47,604 | 100.00 | | |
| Total rejected ballots | | 105 | 0.22 | | |
| Turnout | | 47,709 | 62.86 | | |
