= Ponoka—Didsbury =

Federal electoral district in Alberta, Canada

Alberta electoral district
- Interactive map of riding boundaries from the 2025 federal election. Points indicate the towns of Ponoka and Didsbury.

Federal electoral district
- Legislature: House of Commons
MP
Blaine Calkins
Conservative
- District created: 2023
- First contested: 2025

Demographics
- Population (2021): 114,521
- Electors (2025): 89,331
- Area (km²): 9,573
- Pop. density (per km²): 12
- Census division(s): Division No. 6, Division No. 8
- Census subdivision(s): Red Deer County (part), Sylvan Lake, Lacombe, Mountain View (part), Blackfalds, Lacombe County, Ponoka County (part), Olds, Innisfail, Ponoka

Ponoka—Didsbury is a federal electoral district in Alberta, Canada.

== Geography ==
Under the 2022 Canadian federal electoral redistribution the riding was created from the rural areas of Red Deer—Lacombe and Red Deer—Mountain View:

- Contains Ponoka County, Lacombe County, and the municipalities they surround, the western half of Red Deer County including Innisfail and Bowden and the north-eastern half of Mountain View County including Olds and Didsbury.

== Demographics ==
According to the 2021 Canadian census

Languages: 92.6% English, 1.2% French, 1.2% Tagalog, 1.2% German, 1.0% Dutch

Religions: 51.2% Christian (12.5% Catholic, 6.3% United Church, 3.4% Lutheran, 2.3% Anglican, 1.8% Baptist, 1.3% Reformed, 1.1% Pentecostal, 1.1% Presbyterian, 21.5% Other), 47.1% No religion

Median income: $42,000 (2020)

Average income: $53,800 (2020)

Panethnic groups in Ponoka—Didsbury (2021)
Panethnic group	2021	
Panethnic group	Pop.	%
European (Note: Statistic includes all persons that did not make up part of a visible minority or an indigenous identity.)	98,570	88.17%
Indigenous	6,950	6.22%
Southeast Asian (Note: Statistic includes total responses of "Filipino" and "Southeast Asian" under visible minority section on census.)	2,890	2.59%
South Asian	885	0.79%
African	785	0.7%
East Asian (Note: Statistic includes total responses of "Chinese", "Korean", and "Japanese" under visible minority section on census.)	780	0.7%
Latin American	530	0.47%
Middle Eastern (Note: Statistic includes total responses of "West Asian" and "Arab" under visible minority section on census.)	125	0.11%
Other/multiracial (Note: Statistic includes total responses of "Visible minority, n.i.e." and "Multiple visible minorities" under visible minority section on census.)	285	0.25%
Total responses	111,795	97.61%
Total population	114,535	100%
Notes: Totals greater than 100% due to multiple origin responses. Demographics based on 2022 Canadian federal electoral redistribution riding boundaries.

== History ==
Parliament	Years	Member	Party
Ponoka—Didsbury; Riding created from Red Deer—Lacombe and Red Deer—Mountain View
45th	2025–present	Blaine Calkins	Conservative

== Electoral results ==
2025 Canadian federal election
** Preliminary results — Not yet official **
Party	Candidate	Votes	%	±%	Expenditures
Conservative	Blaine Calkins	56,106	81.8		
New Democratic	Logan Hooley	7,414	10.8		
United	Grant Abraham	2,129	3.1		
No affiliation (Note: Zafar is endorsed by the Liberal Party of Canada, which stated her party affiliation was not registered due to a clerical error with Elections Canada.)	Zarnab Zafar	1,641	2.4		
People's	Larry Gratton	1,289	1.9		
Total valid votes/expense limit					
Total rejected ballots					
Turnout					
Eligible voters					
Source: Elections Canada

2021 federal election redistributed results
Party	Vote	%
Conservative	41,740	67.87
People's	8,213	13.36
New Democratic	6,735	10.95
Liberal	2,862	4.65
Others	1,946	3.16
