= Willie Littlechild =

Canadian politician

Willie Littlechild CC AOE MSC KC
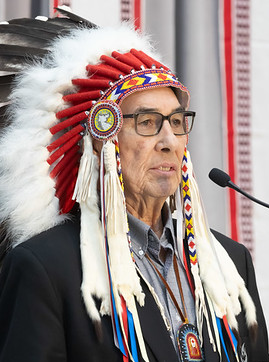
- Littlechild in 2024

Member of Parliament for Wetaskiwin
- In office 1988–1993
- Preceded by: Stanley K. Schellenberger
- Succeeded by: Dale Johnston

Personal details
- Born: J. Wilton Littlechild; 1 April 1944 (age 82) Hobbema, Alberta, Canada
- Party: Progressive Conservative Party of Canada
- Spouse: Helen Peacock
- Children: Teddi; Neil; Megan
- Education: University of Alberta

J. Wilton Littlechild CC AOE MSC KC (born 1944), known as Willie Littlechild, is a Canadian lawyer and Cree chief who was Grand Chief of the Confederacy of Treaty Six First Nations and a member of Parliament. A residential school survivor, he is known for his work nationally and internationally on Indigenous rights. He was born in Hobbema, now named Maskwacis, Alberta.

== Early life and education ==
Wilton Littlechild was born on 1 April 1944 in Hobbema, Alberta, the son of Joseph Smith Littlechild (1915-1983) and Justine Minde, daughter of Chief Dan Minde and Mary Jane Louis. He was raised by his grandparents, and was brought to residential school at the age of six, spending 14 years in the system until his completion of high school. He witnessed and experienced abuses during that time.

As a young man, he was a successful athlete who won ten Athlete of the Year Awards. He graduated with a Bachelor of Physical Education degree in 1967, then obtained a master's degree in physical education from the University of Alberta in 1975. During his time in university, he played on the hockey and swimming teams. He later became the first status Indian from Alberta to obtain a law degree, which was earned at the University of Alberta in 1976. That year, the Cree Nations bestowed him with a headdress as an honorary chief and endowed him with his grandfather's Cree name, Mahihgan Pimoteyw, which means 'walking wolf'.

== Career ==
Littlechild was a member of the 1977 Indigenous delegation to the United Nations and worked on the UN's Declaration on the Rights of Indigenous Peoples. He won the national Tom Longboat Award in 1967 and 1974, and was one of the founders of the North American Indigenous Games, begun in 1990 in Edmonton, Alberta. He also advocated for the creation of the World Indigenous Games, which provides competitive events for Indigenous athletes from around the world. The World Council of Indigenous Games (WIG) was introduced with the approval and blessings of Littlechild. In honour of his lifelong contributions, WIG instituted the International Wilton Award.

Littlechild was the Progressive Conservative Party of Canada Member of Parliament for Wetaskiwin from 1988 to 1993. Littlechild did not stand for re-election in the 1993 general election. After leaving Parliament, Littlechild continued to be involved in politics. He was the founder of the International Organization of Indigenous Resource Development, a United Nations non-governmental organization.

Littlechild is a member of the Ermineskin Cree Nation. The Indian Association of Alberta presents the Willie Littlechild Achievement Award to six First Nations students each year.

Littlechild was made a member of the Order of Canada in 1998 and was promoted to the rank of Companion in 2023. In 2006, he received the Distinguished Service Award of the Canadian Association of Former Parliamentarians, awarded for "outstanding contributions to the promotion and understanding of Canada's parliamentary system of government".

In 2009, Littlechild was appointed as a commissioner to the Truth and Reconciliation Commission of Canada, where he served for six years until the commission's final report and dissolution. In 2017 he was awarded the Meritorious Service Cross for his work on the commission.

Littlechild received the Indspire Award for law and justice in 2015. On 30 November 2016, he became Grand Chief of the Confederacy of Treaty Six First Nations, becoming the first "non-sitting" chief to hold the position, and subsequently served for three years. In 2018, he was awarded the Order of Sport, marking his induction into Canada's Sports Hall of Fame. In 2019, Littlechild won the Pearson Peace Medal. During Pope Francis' visit to Canada in 2022, Littlechild presented the Pontiff with a traditional Indian headdress, generating mixed reactions from the Indigenous community.

== Electoral record ==
1988 Canadian federal election: Wetaskiwin
Party	Candidate	Votes	%	±%
Progressive Conservative	Willie Littlechild	20,090	50.2	-20.7
Reform	Jim Henderson	7,418	18.5	
New Democratic	Terry Atkinson	5,741	14.3	+1.2
Liberal	Roy Barrett	3,351	8.4	+0.8
Christian Heritage	David J. Reimer	3,087	7.7	
Confederation of Regions	Hayward Dow	223	0.6	-6.7
Independent	Mike Hermansen	113	0.3	
Total valid votes		40,023	100.0	

== See also ==
- 34th Canadian Parliament

Parliament of Canada
Preceded by Kenneth Schellenberger	Member of Parliament for Wetaskiwin; 1988–1993	Succeeded by Dale Johnston
Awards
Preceded by Lloyd Axworthy	Pearson Medal of Peace; 2018	Succeeded by Beverley McLachlin
