= Alberta Highway 19 =

Highway in Alberta, Canada

: Highway 19; Highway 625

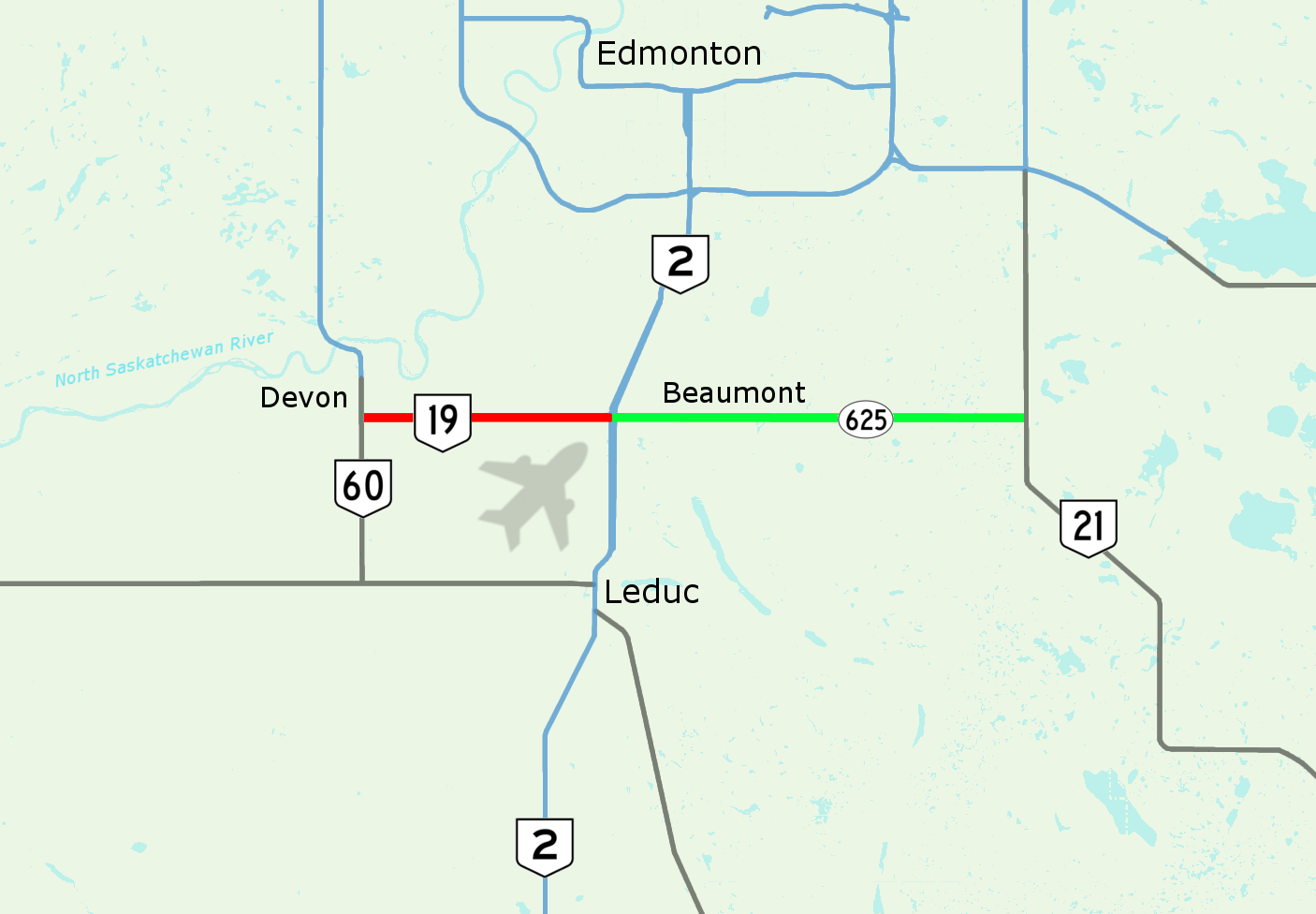
- Highway 19 Highway 625

Route information
- Maintained by the Ministry of Transportation and Economic Corridors

Highway 19
- Length: 12.27 km (7.62 mi)
- West end: Highway 60 in Devon
- East end: Highway 2 in Nisku

Highway 625
- Length: 20.24 km (12.58 mi)
- West end: Highway 2 in Nisku
- Major intersections: Highway 814 in Beaumont
- East end: Highway 21 near Looma

Location
- Country: Canada
- Province: Alberta
- Specialized and rural municipalities: Leduc County
- Major cities: Beaumont, Edmonton
- Towns: Devon,

Highway system
- Alberta Numbered Highway Network; List; Former
← Highway 18	→ Highway 20
← Highway 624	→ Highway 626

Highway 19 and Highway 625 are two provincial highways south of Edmonton in the Canadian province of Alberta that form a continuous east–west route connecting Highway 60 near Devon to Highway 21 east of Beaumont. Highway 19 was acquired by the City of Edmonton in the land annexation approved by the Province in 2019. Highway 19 passes north of the Edmonton International Airport and, in tandem with Highway 60, provides a southwest bypass of Edmonton between Highways 2 and 16. East of Highway 2, Highway 19 becomes Highway 625 and continues through Nisku Industrial Park. It intersects Highway 814 in Beaumont before ending at Highway 21.

Alberta Transportation is planning to upgrade Highway 19 to a divided highway, and has long-term plans for similar upgrades to Highway 625.

== Route description ==
Highway 19 runs for 12.27 km (7.62 mi). It begins at an intersection with Highway 60 as an eastern extension of Halicz-Gildehurst Road at the south end of Devon, proceeding east across Leduc County, intersecting several local roads and crossing Whitemud Creek, where it passes through the extreme southern extent of Edmonton and goes by the name of 105 Avenue SW. It passes north of Edmonton International Airport and becomes a divided highway before a partial cloverleaf interchange with Highway 2 shortly thereafter, marking the end of Highway 19. East of the interchange the divided highway, now designated as Highway 625, continues as the main east–west thoroughfare through industrial and business areas of Nisku. At the east end of Nisku, the divided highway ends and the two-lane road continues east to an intersection with Highway 814 in Beaumont, providing an alternate route north into Edmonton. Further east, Highway 625 ends at Highway 21 (20.24 km (12.58 mi) from Highway 2) south of the hamlet of Looma, and continues in Leduc County as Township Road 504 to Ministik Lake.

== History ==
The original designation of Highway 19 was used for the route that connected Wetaskiwin to Westerose. In the 1940s, Highway 19 was extended around Pigeon Lake, intersecting Highway 12 near the locality of Norbuck, south of Breton. In the early 1960s, Highway 19 was realigned and continued due west from Westerose to Winfield, but was renumbered to Highway 13 in the late 1960s, coinciding with the opening of Highway 2 realignment.

The present-day alignment of Highway 19 was originally constructed as an all-weather gravel road (Township Road 504) that appeared on a 1956 Alberta road map linking Devon to Highway 2. In the 1960s, the preferred route to connecting Beaumont to Highway 2 and Highway 21 was Township Road 510, located north of Beaumont; however, as access was later consolidated and became more limited, Township Road 504 was selected as the preferred route. In c. 1974, the numbered secondary highway system appeared, which at the time was under the jurisdiction of the local rural municipality. The section of Township Road 504 between Highway 2 and Highway 21 being designated as Secondary Highway 625, while the section between Highway 2 and Devon was designated as Secondary Highway 919, indicating a future upgrade to a provincially maintained, primary highway. The interchange at Nisku was opened in 1978, and in 1982, Highway 919 was renumbered to Highway 19. With the 2000 absorption of the secondary highways, Highway 625 became under provincial control.

== Future ==
Twinning of Highway 19 from Highway 60 to Highway 2 is planned. The project includes eight intersection upgrades; two new bridges at Whitemud Creek; illumination at Highway 60 and airport access road; speed limit increase to 110 km/h (68 mph); and traffic signals at the airport access road intersection with a limit of 70 km/h (43 mph). The twinned section from Range Road 253 to Highway 2 was completed in 2019. Twinning of the highway between Highway 60 and Range Road 261 was completed in 2022.

In conjunction with twinning of Highway 19, studies are underway to twin Highway 625 between Highway 2 and Highway 21.

== Major intersections ==
Rural/specialized municipality	Location	km	mi	Destinations	Notes
Leduc County	Devon	0.0	0.0	Highway 60 (Devonian Way) – Calmar, Acheson	Highway 19 western terminus
City of Edmonton		10.6	6.6	145 Street SW / Airport Perimeter Road	Access to Edmonton International Airport
Leduc County	Nisku	12.2 0.0	7.6 0.0	Highway 2 – Edmonton, Leduc, Red Deer, Calgary	Interchange; Hwy 2 exit 525
Leduc County	Nisku	12.2 0.0	7.6 0.0	Highway 19 eastern terminus • Highway 625 western terminus	
Leduc County	Beaumont	8.9	5.5	Highway 814 south / 50 Street north – Edmonton, Wetaskiwin	
Leduc County		20.2	12.6	Highway 21 – Sherwood Park, Fort Saskatchewan, Camrose Township Road 504	Highway 625 eastern terminus
1.000 mi = 1.609 km; 1.000 km = 0.621 mi: Route transition
