= Kenneth Schellenberger =

Canadian politician (born 1948)

Stanley Kenneth Schellenberger (born 7 January 1948 in Edmonton, Alberta) was a Progressive Conservative party member of the House of Commons of Canada. He was an agrologist by career.

He represented the Wetaskiwin electoral district after winning the seat in the 1972 federal election. Schellenberger won successive terms in the 1974, 1979, 1980 and 1984 federal elections. After serving in the 29th through 33rd Canadian Parliaments, Schellenberger left federal politics in 1988 and did not run for reelection.

Parliament of Canada
Preceded by Harry Andrew Moore	Member of Parliament Wetaskiwin; 1972-1988	Succeeded by Willie Littlechild
