= Nisku =

- Hamlet
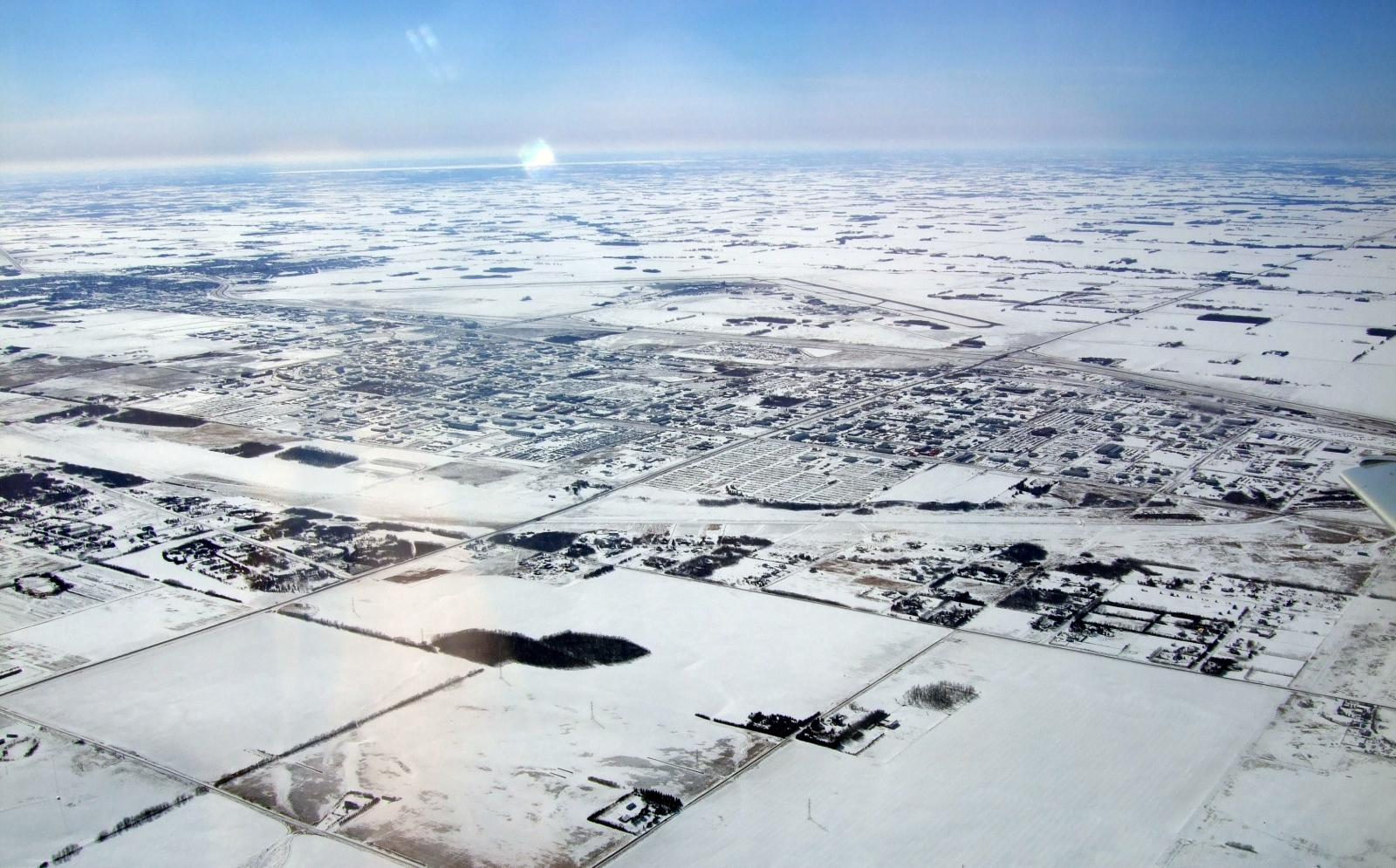

- Location of Nisku in Alberta
- Coordinates: 53°20′00″N 113°32′00″W
- Country: Canada
- Province: Alberta
- Region: Edmonton Metropolitan Region
- Census division: 11
- Municipal district: Leduc County

Government
  - Type: Unincorporated
  - Mayor: Tanni Doblanko
  - Governing body: Leduc County Council: Glenn Belozer; Tanni Doblanko; Kelly-Lynn Lewis; Raymond Scobie; Rick Smith; Kelly Vandenberghe; Larry Wanchuk

Area
  - Total: 65.5 km^{2} (25.3 sq mi)
- Elevation: 705 m (2,313 ft)

Population (2005)
  - Total: 30
- Time zone: UTC−06:00 (Alberta Time)
- Postal code span: T9E
- Area codes: 780, 587, 825

Nisku is a hamlet and an industrial/business park in Alberta, Canada, within Leduc County. It has an elevation of 705 metres (2,313 ft).

The hamlet and industrial/business park are located in census division No. 11 and in the federal riding of Leduc—Wetaskiwin. The word Nisku means "goose" in Cree.

The Hamlet of Nisku is located east of the intersection of Queen Elizabeth II Highway (Highway 2) and Highway 625, between the cities of Edmonton and Leduc. More specifically, the hamlet is located within an industrial/business park on the north side of Highway 625 (20 Avenue) between Sparrow Drive and the Canadian Pacific Kansas City railway.

== Nisku Industrial Park ==
The Nisku Industrial Park or Nisku Business Park, according to Leduc County and the Nisku Business Association, respectively, surrounds the hamlet. The park stretches from Edmonton's southern city limits to Leduc's northern city limits on the east side of the Queen Elizabeth II Highway. It is bisected by Highway 625 (20 Avenue), which becomes Highway 19 west of the Queen Elizabeth II Highway. The southern half of the park is located opposite the Edmonton International Airport.

Established in 1972 by the Sparrow family (brothers Bert, Jim, Murrey, and Don Sparrow), the Nisku Industrial Park has emerged as an important service centre for the Edmonton Metropolitan Region and has become one of the largest industrial/business parks in Western Canada. The park is 2,044 ha (5,050 acres) in size, is home to over 400 businesses, and employs more than 6,000 workers. Leduc County does not levy a business tax in the park. It has been described as "as large as all of downtown Toronto from the waterfront to Forest Hill".

== Demographics ==
Population history of Nisku
Year	Pop.	±%
1941	17	—
1951	59	+247.1%
1956	68	+15.3%
1961	58	−14.7%
1966	49	−15.5%
1971	41	−16.3%
1976	42	+2.4%
1981	77	+83.3%
1986	55	−28.6%
1991	40	−27.3%
Source: Statistics Canada

The population of Nisku, according to the 2005 municipal census conducted by Leduc County, is 30.

== See also ==
- List of communities in Alberta
- List of hamlets in Alberta
