= Ray Thomas (Canadian politician) =

Canadian politician

Member of the Canadian Parliament for Wetaskiwin
- In office 1949–1958
- Preceded by: Norman Jaques
- Succeeded by: James Stanley Speakman

Personal details
- Born: 11 December 1917 Mirror, Alberta
- Died: 8 December 1985 (aged 67)
- Party: Social Credit Party

Ray Thomas (11 December 1917 – 8 December 1985) was a Canadian judge and politician.

Born in Mirror, Alberta, he was elected to the House of Commons of Canada in the riding of Wetaskiwin in the 1949 federal election. A Social Credit Party member, he was re-elected in the 1953 and 1957 elections. He was defeated in the 1958 election. In 1959, he was appointed a provincial court judge.
