= Norman Jaques =

Canadian politician

Member of the Canadian House of Commons for Wetaskiwin
- In office 1935–1949
- Preceded by: William Irvine
- Succeeded by: Ray Thomas

Personal details
- Born: June 29, 1880 London, England
- Died: January 31, 1949 (aged 68)

Norman Jaques (June 29, 1880 – January 31, 1949) was a Canadian farmer and federal politician. Jaques represented the electoral district of Wetaskiwin in the House of Commons of Canada from 1935 to 1949. Jaques was a member of the Social Credit Party.

== Early life and career ==
Jaques was born in London, England, and attended Eastborne College in Sussex. He moved to Canada in 1901, and became a farmer in Mirror, Alberta. He sought to establish a horse-breeding farm at one stage, but later abandoned the project. He had retired from farming before starting his political career.

== Member of Parliament ==
Jaques first ran for the Canadian House of Commons in the 1935 federal election, and defeated Cooperative Commonwealth Federation incumbent William Irvine amid a landslide victory for Social Credit candidates in Alberta. He was re-elected in the general elections of 1940 and 1945, receiving less than 40% of the vote on both occasions. Near the end of his career, he was a member of an external affairs committee that attended United Nations meetings at Lake Success. He died in office in 1949, having been re-nominated as a Social Credit candidate for the 1949 federal election. Social Credit had little standing outside of Alberta during this period, and elected few legislators at the national level. Jaques spent his entire parliamentary career as an opposition member.

The Social Credit movement gained a reputation for antisemitism in its early years, and Jaques was widely regarded as the most antisemitic member of the party's parliamentary grouping. He promoted C.H. Douglas's belief in an international financial Jewish conspiracy, and attempted to read excerpts from Protocols of the Elders of Zion into the Canadian parliamentary record. In private correspondence, he told a Saskatchewan resident that "the Jews control all means of gathering news and of propaganda". Jaques also believed that an international Jewish conspiracy was responsible for both communism and Zionism. He opposed allowing Jewish refugees into Canada prior to World War II on the argument that they constituted a communist invasion force, and once dismissed the charge of anti-Semitism against him as a "communist smokescreen". He was a vocal opponent of the creation of the State of Israel in 1947–1948, and described Zionism as "a political movement ... to dominate the world". Janine Stingel has written that Jaques, in common with other ideologues in his party, "was either unwilling or unable to separate anti-Zionism from anti-Semitism".

Jaques met with American antisemitic leader Gerald L. K. Smith in 1947, and was quoted by the Montreal Gazette as saying that "Gerald Smith is truly a great Christian gentleman who has been cruelly maligned. He stands for Christian nationalism. But, of course, the Communists have smeared him as anti-semitic. ... Smith believes in America for the Americans and in the American way of life. ... I have tried to do the same with the Canadian way of life and Canadian freedom and I will keep right on trying". Jaques later retracted his support for Smith, and said that most of the quotations attributed to him by the Gazette were fabrications. He did, however, describe Smith as having "done more to expose communist plots that any other public man in the United States of America", and said that he would try to do the same in Canada. The Anti-Defamation League described Jaques as a "notorious anti-semite who has abused the privilege of entry into the United States by stirring up misunderstanding and tensions among racial and religious groups."

Jaques was also an opponent of the Canadian Broadcasting Corporation, which he accused of promoting communism.

Some other members of the Social Credit Party attempted to distance themselves from Jaques. Solon Earl Low, who became national party leader in 1944 and himself made antisemitic statements alleging a conspiracy of Jewish bankers, nevertheless said in private correspondence that Jaques "considered himself above party discipline and [...] absent[ed] himself from all caucuses". Toward the end of his life, Jaques's writings were banned from the official Social Credit party journal.

Jaques died of a heart attack in early 1949.

== Electoral record ==
1945 Canadian federal election: Wetaskiwin
Party	Candidate	Votes	%	±%
Social Credit	Norman Jaques	7,255	39.80	–0.15
Co-operative Commonwealth	William Albert Stevens	3,969	21.77	+5.53
Progressive Conservative	Alfred Berger Haarstad	3,419	18.76	+3.04
Liberal	Robert Henry Charles Harrison	3,040	16.68	–11.42
Labor–Progressive	Henry Lundgren	546	3.00	–
Total valid votes		18,229	99.14	
Total rejected ballots		159	0.86	+0.03
Turnout		18,388	71.99	+13.36
Eligible voters		25,543		
Social Credit hold		Swing		+2.69
Source: Library of Parliament

1940 Canadian federal election: Wetaskiwin
Party	Candidate	Votes	%	±%
Social Credit	Norman Jaques	6,245	39.95	–17.75
Liberal	Walter Stephen Campbell	4,392	28.10	+6.83
Co-operative Commonwealth	Robert Henry Haskins	2,539	16.24	–4.80
National Government	Charles Homer Russell	2,456	15.71	–
Total valid votes		15,632	99.16	
Total rejected ballots		132	0.84	–0.12
Turnout		15,764	58.62	–0.43
Eligible voters		26,890		
Social Credit hold		Swing		–5.46
Source: Library of Parliament

1935 Canadian federal election: Wetaskiwin
Party	Candidate	Votes	%	±%
Social Credit	Norman Jaques	7,601	57.70	–
Liberal	Walter Stephen Campbell	2,801	21.26	–2.80
Co-operative Commonwealth	William Irvine	2,772	21.04	–
Total valid votes		13,174	99.04	
Total rejected ballots		128	0.96	+0.54
Turnout		13,302	59.06	–9.10
Eligible voters		22,524		
Social Credit gain from United Farmers of Alberta		Swing		+27.45
Source: Library of Parliament
