= Wetaskiwin (federal electoral district) =

Former federal electoral district in Alberta, Canada

Coordinates: 53.0°N 113.5°W

Alberta electoral district
- Wetaskiwin in relation to the other Alberta federal electoral districts (2003 boundaries)

Defunct federal electoral district
- Legislature: House of Commons
- District created: 1924
- District abolished: 2013
- First contested: 1925
- Last contested: 2011
- District webpage: profile, map

Demographics
- Population (2011): 113,780
- Electors (2011): 79,862
- Area (km²): 14,996.45
- Census division(s): Division No. 8, Division No. 9, Division No. 11
- Census subdivision(s): Leduc County, Clearwater County, Wetaskiwin, Lacombe, County of Wetaskiwin No. 10, Lacombe County, Ponoka County, Brazeau County, Rocky Mountain House, Ponoka

Wetaskiwin was a federal electoral district in Alberta, Canada, that was represented in the House of Commons of Canada from 1925 to 2015.

== Geography ==
In its final configuration, the riding was located south of Edmonton and was legally described as commencing at the intersection of the westerly limit of the Town of Devon with the right bank of the North Saskatchewan River; thence generally southeasterly along the westerly limit of said town to the southwesterly corner of said town (at Highway 60); thence southerly along said highway to Township Road 494; thence easterly along said road to the westerly limit of the City of Leduc; thence easterly, southerly, easterly, northerly and easterly along the southerly limit of said city to Highway No. 623; thence easterly along said highway to the easterly limit of Leduc County; thence generally southwesterly along said limit to the northerly limit of the County of Wetaskiwin No. 10; thence easterly and generally southerly along the northerly and easterly limits of said county to the easterly limit of Ponoka County; thence generally southerly along said limit to the northerly limit of Lacombe County; thence generally southeasterly, generally southerly and generally westerly along the northerly, easterly and southerly limits of said county to the east boundary of R 4 W 5; thence south along the east boundary of R 4 W 5 to the south boundary of Tp 38; thence west along the south boundary of Tp 38 to the west boundary of R 8 W 5; thence north along the west boundary of R 8 W 5 to the north boundary of Tp 41; thence east along the north boundary of Tp 41 to the right bank of the North Saskatchewan River; thence generally northerly and generally easterly along said bank to the point of commencement.

This federal electoral riding represents the County of Wetaskiwin No. 10, Ponoka County, Lacombe County, Leduc County, part of Clearwater County and the cities of Wetaskiwin and Lacombe.

== History ==
This riding was created in 1924 from Strathcona and Victoria ridings.

Like most federal ridings in Alberta, it elected a United Farmers of Alberta MP, former Calgary labour reformer William Irvine, in 1926 and 1930. Then, in 1935 and 1940, it elected Norman Jaques of the radical monetary reform party Social Credit.

Like most other ridings in rural Alberta, Wetaskiwin veered sharply to the right after World War II. It was represented by a centre-right MP without interruption from 1935 onward: Social Credit from 1935 to 1958, the Progressive Conservatives from 1958 to 1993, Reform from 1993 to 2000, the Canadian Alliance from 2000 to 2003, and the Conservatives after 2003. Individual centrist, centre-left or left-wing candidates were usually lucky to approach 20 percent of the vote; the last time a single candidate from a non-right-wing party cleared that hurdle was the 1968 federal election.

That aside, in this riding in every election from 1925 to 1957 (excepting 1935) and in 1962, the successful candidate did not win a majority of the riding's votes. More votes went to the unsuccessful candidates than went to the successful one.

In 2003, a portion of Red Deer riding was transferred to this electoral district. These boundaries took effect at the 2004 Canadian federal election.

The riding was abolished ahead of the 2015 election. The bulk of the riding, including Lacombe, was merged with the northern portion of Red Deer to form Red Deer—Lacombe. Much of the northern portion, including the city of Wetaskiwin, was merged with Edmonton—Mill Woods—Beaumont to form Edmonton—Wetaskiwin. Smaller portions were transferred to Yellowhead and Battle River—Crowfoot.

=== Members of Parliament ===
Parliament	Years	Member	Party
Wetaskiwin; Riding created from Calgary and Strathcona
15th	1925–1926	Stanley Tobin	Liberal
16th	1926–1930	William Irvine	United Farmers
17th	1930–1935	William Irvine	United Farmers
18th	1935–1940	Norman Jaques	Social Credit
19th	1940–1945	Norman Jaques	Social Credit
20th	1945–1949	Norman Jaques	Social Credit
21st	1949–1953	Ray Thomas	Social Credit
22nd	1953–1957	Ray Thomas	Social Credit
23rd	1957–1958	Ray Thomas	Social Credit
24th	1958–1962	James Stanley Speakman	Progressive Conservative
25th	1962–1963	Harry Andrew Moore	Progressive Conservative
26th	1963–1965	Harry Andrew Moore	Progressive Conservative
27th	1965–1968	Harry Andrew Moore	Progressive Conservative
28th	1968–1972	Harry Andrew Moore	Progressive Conservative
29th	1972–1974	Stanley K. Schellenberger	Progressive Conservative
30th	1974–1979	Stanley K. Schellenberger	Progressive Conservative
31st	1979–1980	Stanley K. Schellenberger	Progressive Conservative
32nd	1980–1984	Stanley K. Schellenberger	Progressive Conservative
33rd	1984–1988	Stanley K. Schellenberger	Progressive Conservative
34th	1988–1993	Willie Littlechild	Progressive Conservative
35th	1993–1997	Dale Johnston	Reform
36th	1997–2000	Dale Johnston	Reform
36th	2000–2000	Dale Johnston	Alliance
37th	2000–2003	Dale Johnston	Alliance
37th	2003–2004	Dale Johnston	Conservative
38th	2004–2006	Dale Johnston	Conservative
39th	2006–2008	Blaine Calkins	Conservative
40th	2008–2011	Blaine Calkins	Conservative
41st	2011–2015	Blaine Calkins	Conservative
Riding dissolved into Red Deer—Lacombe, Edmonton—Wetaskiwin, Yellowhead and Battle River—Crowfoot

=== Last member of Parliament ===
Its most recent member of Parliament before it ceased to exist was Blaine Calkins, a member of the Conservative Party of Canada.

== Election results ==
=== 2011 ===
2011 Canadian federal election
Party	Candidate	Votes	%	±%	Expenditures
Conservative	Blaine Calkins	37,756	81.44	+4.30	$25,003.37
New Democratic	Tim Robson	5,281	11.39	+2.77	$1,717.59
Green	Robert Johnston	1,978	4.27	–3.79	none listed
Liberal	Christopher Anderson	1,348	2.91	–2.69	$5,920.75
Total valid votes/expense limit		46,363	99.74	–	$92,994.94
Total rejected ballots		122	0.26	+0.01	
Turnout		46,485	57.92	+4.98	
Eligible voters		80,262			
Conservative hold		Swing		+3.54	
Source: Elections Canada

=== 2008 ===
2008 Canadian federal election
Party	Candidate	Votes	%	±%	Expenditures
Conservative	Blaine Calkins	32,528	77.14	+1.98	$30,900.05
New Democratic	Tim Robson	3,636	8.62	–0.71	$6,371.28
Green	Les Parsons	3,395	8.05	+1.72	$387.56
Liberal	Rita Katherine Dillon	2,362	5.60	–3.58	$11,501.89
Canadian Action	Shawn Mann	249	0.59	–	none listed
Total valid votes/expense limit		42,170	99.75	–	$90,704.06
Total rejected ballots		105	0.25	+0.03	
Turnout		42,275	52.94	–9.93	
Eligible voters		79,862			
Conservative hold		Swing		+1.34	
Source: Elections Canada

=== 2006 ===
2006 Canadian federal election
Party	Candidate	Votes	%	±%	Expenditures
Conservative	Blaine Calkins	35,776	75.15	+1.49	$35,841.27
New Democratic	Jim Graves	4,441	9.33	+2.08	$5,769.23
Liberal	Peter Crossley	4,371	9.18	–2.75	$9,976.10
Green	Tom Lampman	3,016	6.34	+0.14	$499.99
Total valid votes/expense limit		47,604	99.78	–	$82,565.87
Total rejected ballots		105	0.22	–0.02	
Turnout		47,709	62.86	+2.09	
Eligible voters		75,895			
Conservative hold		Swing		+2.12	
Source: Elections Canada

=== 2004 ===
2004 Canadian federal election
Party	Candidate	Votes	%	±%	Expenditures
Conservative	Dale Johnston	31,404	73.66	–4.95	$30,616.15
Liberal	Rick Bonnett	5,088	11.93	–5.23	$20,307.51
New Democratic	Tim Robson	3,090	7.25	+3.03	$4,471.61
Green	Tom Lampman	2,642	6.20	–	$804.63
Canadian Action	Brent McKelvie	410	0.96	–	$308.20
Total valid votes/expense limit		42,634	99.76	–	$78,597.94
Total rejected ballots		102	0.24	+0.02	
Turnout		42,736	60.77	–3.20	
Eligible voters		70,323			
Conservative hold		Swing		+5.09	
Source: Elections Canada

=== 2000 ===
2000 Canadian federal election
Party	Candidate	Votes	%	±%	Expenditures
Alliance	Dale Johnston	33,675	69.50	+3.55	$29,250
Liberal	John Jackie	8,318	17.17	+2.97	$30,902
Progressive Conservative	Kenneth R. Sockett	4,413	9.11	–4.07	$2,406
New Democratic	Clifford Reid	2,045	4.22	–0.62	$501
Total valid votes		48,451	99.78		
Total rejected ballots		106	0.22	+0.02	
Turnout		48,557	63.98	+2.94	
Eligible voters		75,900			
Alliance hold		Swing		+3.26	
Source: Elections Canada

=== 1997 ===
1997 Canadian federal election
Party	Candidate	Votes	%	±%	Expenditures
Reform	Dale Johnston	26,443	65.96	+2.54	$30,470
Liberal	Glenn McLean	5,692	14.20	–2.53	$10,198
Progressive Conservative	Graham T. McNamee	5,282	13.18	–1.64	$9,180
New Democratic	Clifford Reid	1,940	4.84	+1.27	$3,111
Christian Heritage	Gordon Allan Liddle	734	1.83	–	$3,185
Total valid votes		40,091	99.81		
Total rejected ballots		78	0.19	+0.02	
Turnout		40,169	61.03	–4.88	
Eligible voters		65,818			
Reform hold		Swing		+2.54	
Source: Elections Canada

=== 1993 ===
1993 Canadian federal election
Party	Candidate	Votes	%	±%
Reform	Dale Johnston	26,210	63.41	+44.88
Liberal	Douglas Albert Sirrs	6,914	16.73	+8.36
Progressive Conservative	Brian Rhiness	6,124	14.82	–35.38
New Democratic	Clifford Reid	1,475	3.57	–10.78
Canada Party	David M. Greene	335	0.81	–
Natural Law	Randy Fritz	274	0.66	–
Total valid votes		41,332	99.83	
Total rejected ballots		71	0.17	+0.02
Turnout		41,403	65.91	–8.80
Eligible voters		62,813		
Reform gain from Progressive Conservative		Swing		+26.62
Source: Library of Parliament

=== 1988 ===
1988 Canadian federal election
Party	Candidate	Votes	%	±%
Progressive Conservative	Willie Littlechild	20,090	50.20	–20.74
Reform	Jim Henderson	7,418	18.53	–
New Democratic	Terry Atkinson	5,741	14.34	+1.17
Liberal	Roy Barrett	3,351	8.37	+0.77
Christian Heritage	David Reimer	3,087	7.71	–
Confederation of Regions	Hayward Dow	223	0.56	–6.65
Independent	Mike Hermansen	113	0.28	–
Total valid votes		40,023	99.85	
Total rejected ballots		62	0.15	–0.06
Turnout		40,085	74.71	+7.26
Eligible voters		53,651		
Progressive Conservative hold		Swing		–1.10
Source: Library of Parliament

=== 1984 ===
1984 Canadian federal election
Party	Candidate	Votes	%	±%
Progressive Conservative	Kenneth Schellenberger	30,128	70.93	–4.05
New Democratic	Judy Mjolsness	5,596	13.18	+2.83
Liberal	Mel Harrison Buffalo	3,231	7.61	–7.06
Confederation of Regions	Bob Matheson	3,063	7.21	–
Social Credit	Jim Green	456	1.07	–
Total valid votes		42,474	99.78	
Total rejected ballots		92	0.22	–0.08
Turnout		42,566	67.45	+3.38
Eligible voters		63,106		
Progressive Conservative hold		Swing		–0.61
Source: Library of Parliament

=== 1980 ===
1980 Canadian federal election
Party	Candidate	Votes	%	±%
Progressive Conservative	Kenneth Schellenberger	26,620	74.98	–1.32
Liberal	Patricia O'Halloran	5,208	14.67	+0.82
New Democratic	Lyle B. Bleich	3,673	10.35	+0.50
Total valid votes		35,501	99.71	
Total rejected ballots		105	0.29	+0.04
Turnout		35,606	64.07	–5.47
Eligible voters		55,573		
Progressive Conservative hold		Swing		–0.25
Source: Library of Parliament

=== 1979 ===
1979 Canadian federal election
Party	Candidate	Votes	%	±%
Progressive Conservative	Kenneth Schellenberger	27,785	76.30	+9.42
Liberal	Mark Toth	5,044	13.85	–3.84
New Democratic	Alfred O. Arnston	3,587	9.85	+0.74
Total valid votes		36,416	99.75	
Total rejected ballots		92	0.25	–0.01
Turnout		36,508	69.54	+1.05
Eligible voters		52,500		
Progressive Conservative hold		Swing		+2.79
Source: Library of Parliament

=== 1974 ===
1974 Canadian federal election
Party	Candidate	Votes	%	±%
Progressive Conservative	Kenneth Schellenberger	21,341	66.88	+4.85
Liberal	Roger Movold	5,645	17.69	+0.72
New Democratic	Alfred O. Arnston	2,906	9.11	–3.63
Social Credit	Alvin Goetz	2,019	6.33	–1.93
Total valid votes		31,911	99.73	
Total rejected ballots		85	0.27	–0.93
Turnout		31,996	68.49	–7.26
Eligible voters		46,718		
Progressive Conservative hold		Swing		+2.78
Source: Library of Parliament

=== 1972 ===
1972 Canadian federal election
Party	Candidate	Votes	%	±%
Progressive Conservative	Kenneth Schellenberger	19,353	62.03	–2.75
Liberal	Al Barnhill	5,296	16.97	–4.24
New Democratic	Lionel Udenberg	3,975	12.74	–1.26
Social Credit	Alvin Goetz	2,576	8.26	–
Total valid votes		31,200	98.80	
Total rejected ballots		378	1.20	+0.47
Turnout		31,578	75.75	+6.33
Eligible voters		41,689		
Progressive Conservative hold		Swing		–3.50
Source: Library of Parliament

=== 1968 ===
1968 Canadian federal election
Party	Candidate	Votes	%	±%
Progressive Conservative	Harry Andrew Moore	15,178	64.78	+14.78
Liberal	René Béguin	4,970	21.21	+11.54
New Democratic	Nels Nelson	3,281	14.00	+1.88
Total valid votes		23,429	99.27	
Total rejected ballots		172	0.73	+0.27
Turnout		23,601	69.42	–5.74
Eligible voters		33,999		
Progressive Conservative hold		Swing		+13.16
Source: Library of Parliament

=== 1965 ===
1965 Canadian federal election
Party	Candidate	Votes	%	±%
Progressive Conservative	Harry Andrew Moore	10,754	50.00	–3.06
Social Credit	Ivan Paul Stonehocker	6,065	28.20	–1.45
New Democratic	Nels Nelson	2,607	12.12	+6.40
Liberal	Albert Butch Dyberg	2,081	9.68	–1.88
Total valid votes		21,507	99.54	
Total rejected ballots		100	0.46	–0.04
Turnout		21,607	75.15	–2.12
Eligible voters		28,751		
Progressive Conservative hold		Swing		–2.26
Source: Library of Parliament

=== 1963 ===
1963 Canadian federal election
Party	Candidate	Votes	%	±%
Progressive Conservative	Harry Andrew Moore	11,601	53.06	+7.65
Social Credit	Ivan Paul Stonehocker	6,483	29.65	–2.05
Liberal	Ronald Alexander Gordon	2,527	11.56	–2.86
New Democratic	William Stroschein	1,252	5.73	–2.74
Total valid votes		21,863	99.50	
Total rejected ballots		110	0.50	–0.14
Turnout		21,973	77.27	+4.33
Eligible voters		28,435		
Progressive Conservative hold		Swing		+2.80
Source: Library of Parliament

=== 1962 ===
1962 Canadian federal election
Party	Candidate	Votes	%	±%
Progressive Conservative	Harry Andrew Moore	9,204	45.41	–12.70
Social Credit	Floyd Hawley	6,426	31.71	+7.96
Liberal	Ronald Alexander Gordon	2,923	14.42	+5.04
New Democratic	William Stroschein	1,715	8.46	–0.30
Total valid votes		20,268	99.36	
Total rejected ballots		130	0.64	+0.20
Turnout		20,398	72.94	+1.83
Eligible voters		27,964		
Progressive Conservative hold		Swing		–2.37
Source: Library of Parliament

=== 1958 ===
1958 Canadian federal election
Party	Candidate	Votes	%	±%
Progressive Conservative	James Stanley Speakman	10,557	58.11	+38.35
Social Credit	Ray Thomas	4,314	23.75	–21.93
Liberal	Ernest Oscar Larson	1,704	9.38	–11.99
Co-operative Commonwealth	William Irvine	1,591	8.76	–4.43
Total valid votes		18,166	99.57	
Total rejected ballots		79	0.43	–0.15
Turnout		18,245	71.12	+1.69
Eligible voters		25,655		
Progressive Conservative gain from Social Credit		Swing		+8.21
Source: Library of Parliament

=== 1957 ===
1957 Canadian federal election
Party	Candidate	Votes	%	±%
Social Credit	Ray Thomas	7,968	45.68	–1.03
Liberal	Frederick Johns	3,727	21.37	–3.82
Progressive Conservative	James Stanley Speakman	3,447	19.76	+6.81
Co-operative Commonwealth	Andrew Borys	2,301	13.19	–1.96
Total valid votes		17,443	99.41	
Total rejected ballots		103	0.59	–0.08
Turnout		17,546	69.43	+11.54
Eligible voters		25,273		
Social Credit hold		Swing		–2.43
Source: Library of Parliament

=== 1953 ===
1953 Canadian federal election
Party	Candidate	Votes	%	±%
Social Credit	Ray Thomas	6,920	46.71	+11.72
Liberal	Clinton Carruthers Reed	3,731	25.19	–6.28
Co-operative Commonwealth	Ernest John Ingram	2,245	15.15	–1.14
Progressive Conservative	Jack Bowie-Reed	1,918	12.95	–4.31
Total valid votes		14,814	99.33	
Total rejected ballots		100	0.67	–0.10
Turnout		14,914	57.89	–8.41
Eligible voters		25,763		
Social Credit hold		Swing		+2.72
Source: Library of Parliament

=== 1949 ===
1949 Canadian federal election
Party	Candidate	Votes	%	±%
Social Credit	Ray Thomas	6,774	34.99	–4.81
Liberal	Paul Moseson	6,091	31.46	+14.79
Progressive Conservative	Alfred Berger Haarstad	3,340	17.25	–1.50
Co-operative Commonwealth	William Albert Stevens	3,154	16.29	–5.48
Total valid votes		19,359	99.23	
Total rejected ballots		150	0.77	–0.10
Turnout		19,509	66.30	–5.69
Eligible voters		29,426		
Social Credit hold		Swing		+4.99
Source: Library of Parliament

=== 1945 ===
1945 Canadian federal election
Party	Candidate	Votes	%	±%
Social Credit	Norman Jaques	7,255	39.80	–0.15
Co-operative Commonwealth	William Albert Stevens	3,969	21.77	+5.53
Progressive Conservative	Alfred Berger Haarstad	3,419	18.76	+3.04
Liberal	Robert Henry Charles Harrison	3,040	16.68	–11.42
Labor–Progressive	Henry Lundgren	546	3.00	–
Total valid votes		18,229	99.14	
Total rejected ballots		159	0.86	+0.03
Turnout		18,388	71.99	+13.36
Eligible voters		25,543		
Social Credit hold		Swing		+2.69
Source: Library of Parliament

=== 1940 ===
1940 Canadian federal election
Party	Candidate	Votes	%	±%
Social Credit	Norman Jaques	6,245	39.95	–17.75
Liberal	Walter Stephen Campbell	4,392	28.10	+6.83
Co-operative Commonwealth	Robert Henry Haskins	2,539	16.24	–4.80
National Government	Charles Homer Russell	2,456	15.71	–
Total valid votes		15,632	99.16	
Total rejected ballots		132	0.84	–0.12
Turnout		15,764	58.62	–0.43
Eligible voters		26,890		
Social Credit hold		Swing		–5.46
Source: Library of Parliament

=== 1935 ===
1935 Canadian federal election
Party	Candidate	Votes	%	±%
Social Credit	Norman Jaques	7,601	57.70	–
Liberal	Walter Stephen Campbell	2,801	21.26	–2.80
Co-operative Commonwealth	William Irvine	2,772	21.04	–
Total valid votes		13,174	99.04	
Total rejected ballots		128	0.96	+0.54
Turnout		13,302	59.06	–9.10
Eligible voters		22,524		
Social Credit gain from United Farmers of Alberta		Swing		+27.45
Source: Library of Parliament

=== 1930 ===
1930 Canadian federal election
Party	Candidate	Votes	%	±%
United Farmers of Alberta	William Irvine	4,750	39.74	–2.21
Conservative	Charles Homer Russell	4,326	36.19	+12.05
Liberal	William Hayhurst	2,876	24.06	–9.84
Total valid votes		11,952	99.58	
Total rejected ballots		51	0.42	–0.13
Turnout		12,003	68.16	+10.75
Eligible voters		17,610		
United Farmers of Alberta hold		Swing		+4.92
Source: Library of Parliament

=== 1926 ===
1926 Canadian federal election
Party	Candidate	Votes	%	±%
United Farmers of Alberta	William Irvine	3,897	41.95	–
Liberal	Stanley Tobin	3,150	33.91	–5.28
Conservative	Charles Homer Russell	2,243	24.14	–0.09
Total valid votes		9,290	99.44	
Total rejected ballots		52	0.56	+0.20
Turnout		9,342	57.41	+3.70
Eligible voters		16,272		
United Farmers of Alberta gain from Liberal		Swing		+18.34
Source: Library of Parliament

=== 1925 ===
1925 Canadian federal election
Party	Candidate	Votes	%
Liberal	Stanley Tobin	3,429	39.18
Progressive	Daniel Webster Warner	3,201	36.58
Conservative	Charles Homer Russell	2,121	24.24
Total valid votes		8,751	99.65
Total rejected ballots		31	0.35
Turnout		8,782	53.71
Eligible voters		16,350	
Source: Library of Parliament

== See also ==
- Wetaskiwin (provincial electoral district)
- Wetaskiwin (N.W.T. electoral district)
- List of Canadian electoral districts
- Historical federal electoral districts of Canada
