= Beaumont, Alberta =

City in Canada

Beaumont
- City
- City of Beaumont
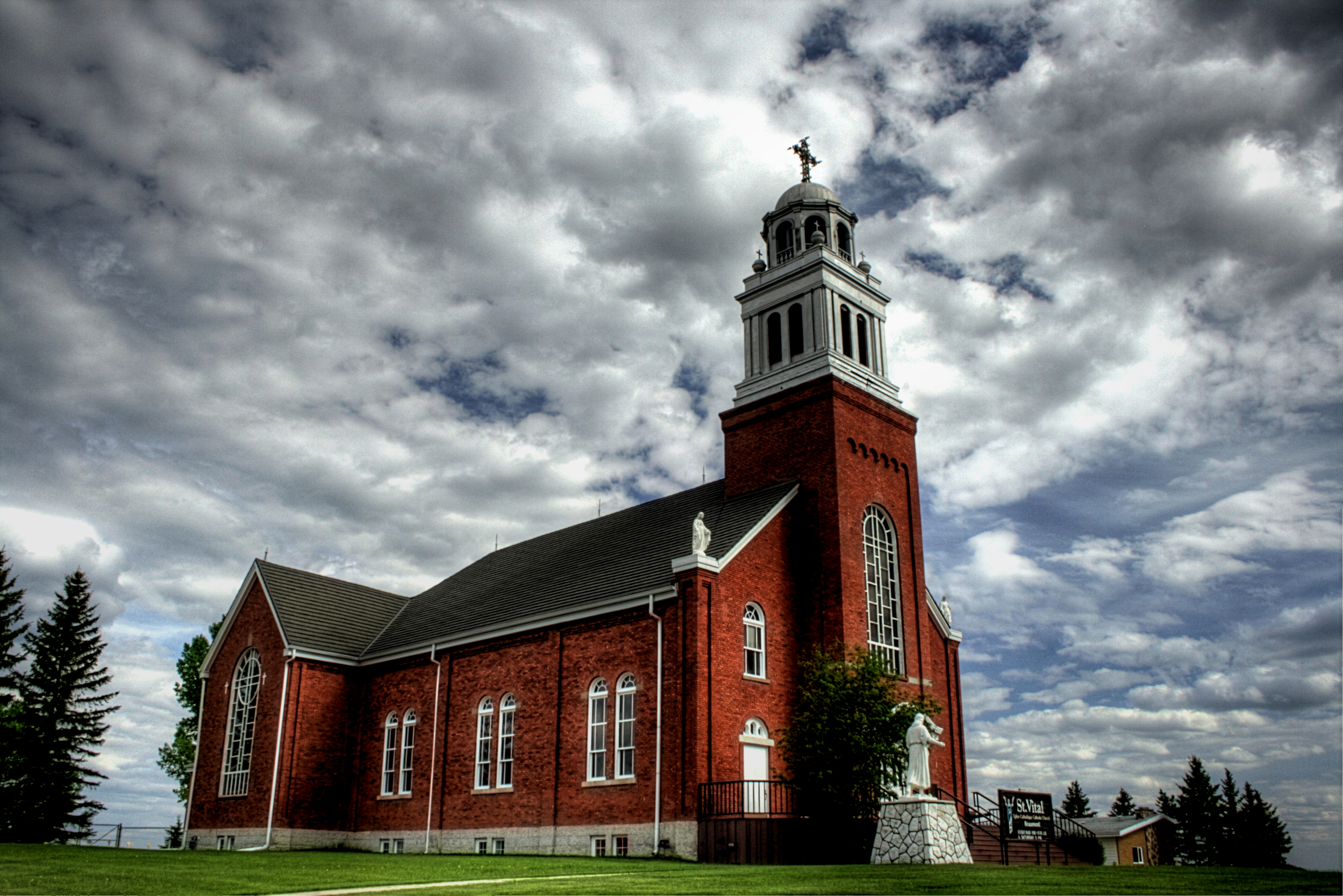
- St. Vital Roman Catholic Church in Beaumont

- Flag Logo
- Motto: Life is better in Beaumont!
- City boundaries

- Location in Alberta Location in Canada Location in Leduc County
- Coordinates: 53°21′26″N 113°24′53″W
- Country: Canada
- Province: Alberta
- Region: Edmonton Metropolitan Region
- Municipal district: Leduc County
- Founded: 1895
- Incorporated
  - Village: January 1, 1973
  - Town: January 1, 1980
  - City: January 1, 2019

Government
  - Mayor: Lisa Vanderkwaak
  - City council: Kathy Barnhart; Catherine McCook; Nathan Netelenbos; Sam Munckhof-Swain; Philip Penrod; Steven VanNieuwkerk
  - CAO: Mike Schwirtz
  - MLA: Brandon Lunty

Area (2021)
  - Land: 24.7 km^{2} (9.5 sq mi)
- Elevation: 735 m (2,411 ft)

Population (2021)
  - Total: 20,888
  - Density: 845.6/km^{2} (2,190/sq mi)
  - Municipal census (2019): 19,236
  - Estimate (2020): 21,443
- Time zone: UTC−06:00 (Alberta Time)
- Forward sortation area: T4X
- Area codes: 780, 587, 825
- Highways: Highway 625; Highway 814
- Website: beaumont.ab.ca

Beaumont (/ˈboʊmɒnt/ BOH-mont) is a city adjacent to Leduc County within the Edmonton Metropolitan Region of Alberta, Canada. It is at the intersection of Highway 625 and Highway 814, adjacent to the City of Edmonton and 6.0 kilometres (3.7 mi) northeast of the City of Leduc. The Nisku Industrial Park and the Edmonton International Airport are 4.0 kilometres (2.5 mi) to the west and 8.0 kilometres (5.0 mi) to the southwest respectively.

Originally a French-speaking farming community, Beaumont is now a city with 20,888 people. Its downtown core resembles a French village with unique architecture and red brick walkways. It is named for the "beautiful hill" on which St. Vital Church, built in 1919, is located within the centre of the city. The name was selected in 1895 as part of a petition for a post office.

Beaumont is one of four municipalities in Alberta that are officially bilingual.

== History ==
Beaumont incorporated as a village on January 1, 1973, and then as a town on January 1, 1980. On January 1, 2019, Beaumont incorporated as a city.

== Demographics ==
Federal census population history
Year	Pop.	±%
1941	65	—
1951	149	+129.2%
1956	121	−18.8%
1961	194	+60.3%
1966	234	+20.6%
1971	337	+44.0%
1976	851	+152.5%
1981	2,638	+210.0%
1986	3,944	+49.5%
1991	5,042	+27.8%
1996	5,810	+15.2%
2001	7,006	+20.6%
2006	8,961	+27.9%
2011	13,284	+48.2%
2016	17,396	+31.0%
2021	20,888	+20.1%
Source: Statistics Canada

In the 2021 Census of Population conducted by Statistics Canada, the City of Beaumont had a population of 20,888 living in 6,950 of its 7,168 total private dwellings, a change of 19.7% from its 2016 population of 17,457. With a land area of 24.7 km^{2} (9.5 sq mi), it had a population density of 845.7/km^{2} (2,190.3/sq mi) in 2021.

The population of the City of Beaumont according to its 2019 municipal census is 19,236, a change of 2.2% from its 2018 municipal census population of 18,829.

In the 2016 Census of Population conducted by Statistics Canada, Beaumont had a population of 17,396 living in 5,633 of its 5,980 total private dwellings, a 31% change from its 2011 population of 13,284. With a land area of 10.47 km^{2} (4.04 sq mi), it had a population density of 1,661.5/km^{2} (4,303.3/sq mi) in 2016.

In 2014, 49.6% of the workforce of Beaumont was employed in the nearby city of Edmonton.

Panethnic groups in the City of Beaumont (2001–2021)
Panethnic group	2021		2016		2011		2006		2001	
Panethnic group	Pop.	%	Pop.	%	Pop.	%	Pop.	%	Pop.	%
European (Note: Statistic includes all persons that did not make up part of a visible minority or an indigenous identity.)	16,245	77.91%	14,470	83.4%	11,820	88.97%	8,290	92.52%	6,630	94.65%
South Asian	1,625	7.79%	685	3.95%	255	1.92%	45	0.5%	25	0.36%
Indigenous	1,100	5.28%	1,090	6.28%	570	4.29%	290	3.24%	225	3.21%
Southeast Asian (Note: Statistic includes total responses of "Filipino" and "Southeast Asian" under visible minority section on census.)	680	3.26%	215	1.24%	180	1.35%	85	0.95%	80	1.14%
African	505	2.42%	370	2.13%	215	1.62%	50	0.56%	0	0%
East Asian (Note: Statistic includes total responses of "Chinese", "Korean", and "Japanese" under visible minority section on census.)	210	1.01%	160	0.92%	140	1.05%	125	1.4%	20	0.29%
Latin American	180	0.86%	135	0.78%	35	0.26%	30	0.33%	0	0%
Middle Eastern (Note: Statistic includes total responses of "West Asian" and "Arab" under visible minority section on census.)	90	0.43%	55	0.32%	0	0%	40	0.45%	35	0.5%
Other/multiracial (Note: Statistic includes total responses of "Visible minority, n.i.e." and "Multiple visible minorities" under visible minority section on census.)	205	0.98%	60	0.35%	20	0.15%	15	0.17%	0	0%
Total responses	20,850	99.82%	17,350	99.39%	13,285	100.01%	8,960	99.99%	7,005	99.99%
Total population	20,888	100%	17,457	100%	13,284	100%	8,961	100%	7,006	100%
Note: Totals greater than 100% due to multiple origin responses

== Economy ==
The City of Beaumont is a member of the Leduc-Nisku Economic Development Association, an economic development partnership that markets Alberta's International Region in proximity to the Edmonton International Airport.

== Arts and culture ==
Beaumont is home to the Beaumont Music Festival (BMF), formerly the Beaumont Blues & Roots Festival (BBRF). Previous performers at the BMF/BBRF have included Chantal Kreviazuk, Raine Maida, Corb Lund, Fred Penner, Matt Andersen, Sloan, Powder Blues Band, The Sheepdogs, Moist, The Watchmen, The Beaches, 54-40, The Grapes of Wrath, and The Odds. Annually, the Beaumont Days Festival is hosted in early summer. This includes a parade, carnival, and events held at Bibliotheque de Beaumont Library.

== Infrastructure ==
=== Transportation ===
Highways
Two highways pass through Beaumont: Highway 814 and Highway 625. Highway 814 passes north/south through Beaumont connecting Edmonton to the city. Highway 625 passes east/west through Beaumont connecting Nisku and the Edmonton International Airport to the City.
Local streets
The majority of the streets in Beaumont use a standard numbered system.
Transit
Edmonton Transit Service offers a commuter transit route from Beaumont to Edmonton's Mill Woods Transit Centre.
Air
The nearest major international airport is the Edmonton International Airport, west of Beaumont.

=== Education ===
Public schools

Beaumont is part of the Black Gold School Division. The following public schools are in Beaumont.

- Black Gold Home-Based School
- Black Gold Outreach School Beaumont
- École Beau Meadow School
- École Bellevue School
- École Champs Vallée School
- École Dansereau Meadows School
- École Horizon Heights School
- École J. E. Lapointe School
- École Secondaire Beaumont Composite High School

Separate schools

Spruce Grove is part of the St Thomas Aquinas Roman Catholic Separate School Division. The following separate schools are in Spruce Grove.

- Académie Saint-André Academy
- École Mother d'Youville School

== Locations of interest ==
- Beaumont Library
- Beaumont Sports and Recreation Centre
- Chartier, French-Canadian style restaurant
- Chantal Bérubé Youth Centre
- Coloniale Golf Club
- Four Seasons Park
- Ken Nichol Regional Recreation Centre
- Maina's Donair, family-owned restaurant
- St. Vital Catholic Church

== Notable people ==
- Hector Goudreau, former politician
- Noah Gregor, professional ice hockey player
- Marc Magnan, retired professional ice hockey player
- Ryan Stock, stunt performer and contestant on America's Got Talent
- Jake Taylor, professional football player
- Darcy Werenka, retired professional hockey player

== See also ==
- List of cities in Alberta
- List of francophone communities in Alberta
