= Eastmain (Cree Nation) =

Coordinates: 52°14′45″N 78°30′2″W

Cree Nation of Eastmain Band No. 57 ᐙᐸᓅᑖᐤ (Wâpanûtâw)
- People: Cree
- Headquarters: Eastmain
- Province: Quebec

Land
- Main reserve: Eastmain (TC) (Note: Terres réservées aux Cris (TC) – Parcels of land in Quebec set aside for the permanent residence of Cree First Nations of Quebec. Terres réservées aux Cris (TC) are adjacent to villages cris (VC). The area of a village cri is set aside for the use of Cree bands, but members of Cree bands are not permanently residing there.)
- Other reserve(s): Eastmain (VC)
- Land area: 147.66 (TC), 318.75 (VC) km^{2}

Population (October 2019)
- On reserve: 805
- On other land: 64
- Off reserve: 48
- Total population: 917

Government
- Chief: Raymond Shanoush
- Council: Daniel Mark-Stewart (Deputy Chief); Johnny Tomatuk; Stanley Gilpin; Tina Petawabano

Tribal Council
- Grand Council of the Crees

Website
- Eastmain.ca

Eastmain (Cree: ᐙᐸᓅᑖᐤ (Wâpanûtâw) meaning "Lands east of James Bay") is a Cree First Nation of Canada. Its members primarily live in the Terres réservées aux Cris or Cree reserved land (Indian reserve) of Eastmain, Quebec. It is governed by a band council and is a member of the Tribal Council of the Grand Council of the Crees.

== Location ==
The reserve is on the southern shore at the mouth of the Eastmain River as it empties into the eastern shore of James Bay. Adjacent to the reserved land is the village cri or Cree village of the same name. A Cree village is set aside for the use of the Nation, but members do not permanently residing there. The community is one of nine Cree First Nations that make up Eeyou Istchee, an equivalent territory which is an enclave within the Jamésie territory of Nord-du-Québec (Northern Quebec). The Eastmain Cree reserved land is 147.66 km^{2} (36,490 acres) and Eastmain Cree village is 318.75 km^{2} (78,760 acres). The community is accessible by road; 103 km (64 mi) to the James Bay Road which connects to the cities of the south. The community's airport, Eastmain River Airport, has regular service by Air Creebec to Montreal and other Cree and northern communities.

== History ==
Ancestors of today's First Nations occupied the region around James Bay for more than 7000 years with artifacts dated to 3000–3500 years ago. Nomad hunters followed game as the last glaciers melted. Eventually, the groups later permanently establishing themselves in what is known as Eeyou Istchee (the Cree traditional territory in eastern James Bay).

Henry Hudson, during his exploration of the bay with his name, first made contact with the Crees of James Bay in 1610. After spending the winter of 1668–1669, explorers Pierre-Esprit Radisson and Médard des Groseilliers convinced the English Crown, primarily Prince Rupert of the Rhine that a colonial enterprise in the bay would yield wealth in minerals and fur. This led to the creation of the Hudson's Bay Company. As a result, the trading outposts were established in the region and the fur trade boomed.

Eastmain got its name in 1730 by the local Hudson's Bay trading post that had become the company's trading headquarters for the east coast of James Bay and Hudson Bay. The town was known as East Main House and was originally on the north shore of the Eastmain River, but in 1762, Eastmain was relocated to the south shore because it provided easier access to the town from the James Bay. Cree people began to settle in the area and the community of Eastmain was established in the early 18th century, however, the territory was reserved for the use of the Crees only in 1962.

== Population ==
As of October 2019, Eastmain had a total registered population of 917 members with 806 living on the reserve. During Statistics Canada's 2016 Census, the reserve had 866 residents up from 767 in 2011, a 12.9% increase.

== Languages ==
The Cree people speaks the Cree language. According to the 2016 Census, 87.3% of the members of the Eastmain First Nation have an indigenous language as first language. 92.5% speak an indigenous language at home and 94.2% know an indigenous language. For official languages, 76.9% know only English, 0% know only French, 17.9% know both, while 5.2% don't speak either official language.
