= YMT =

YMT may refer to:

- Youth Music Theatre UK a leading youth arts organisation and one of eight National Youth Music Organisations in the United Kingdom. On 4 December 2018 the organisation changed its name to British Youth Music Theatre
- Chibougamau/Chapais Airport IATA code, an airport in Quebec, Canada
- Yau Ma Tei, a place in Kowloon, Hong Kong
  - Yau Ma Tei station, Hong Kong; MTR station code
- A US Navy hull classification symbol: Yard motor tug (YMT)

Ymt or ymt may refer to:

- Yorkville Massage Therapy, a registered massage therapy clinic located in Toronto, Ontario, Canada
- Yersinia murine toxin, a protein associated with Yersinia pestis, the causal agent of plague
- Mator language (AKA Karagas language) ISO 639-3 code, a Siberian language
