= Nemiscau Airport =

Airport in Nemaska, Quebec, Canada

- IATA: YNS; ICAO: CYHH

Summary
- Airport type: Private
- Operator: Hydro-Québec
- Location: Nemaska, Quebec
- Time zone: EST (UTC−05:00)
  - Summer (DST): EDT (UTC−04:00)
- Elevation AMSL: 802 ft (244 m)
- Coordinates: 51°41′28″N 076°08′08″W

Map
- Location in Quebec

Runways
Direction	Length		Surface
Direction	ft	m	Surface
09/27	5,000	1,524	Gravel
- Canada Flight Supplement

Nemiscau Airport (IATA: YNS, ICAO: CYHH) is located 4 nautical miles (7.4 km; 4.6 mi) southeast of Nemaska, Quebec, Canada, along Route du Nord at km 294. It was built and is operated by Hydro-Québec to serve their large electrical substations of Nemiscau and Albanel. Air Creebec has scheduled flights to and from this airport at the discretion of Hydro-Québec.

The airport has one of the better gravel runways in the region. Lights are controlled by a ground radio operator, and thus the radio operator must be present for night operations (they typically go home while it is still daylight). Permission is required prior to landing private aircraft via telephone.

== Airlines and destinations ==
Airlines	Destinations
Air Creebec	Chibougamau, Montreal–Trudeau
