= Billy Diamond =

Cree chief (1949–2010)

Billy Diamond (May 19, 1949 – September 30, 2010) was the Chief of the Waskaganish, Quebec Cree from 1970 to 1976, the Grand Chief of the Grand Council of the Crees from 1974 to 1984, and a successful businessman who founded Air Creebec.

Diamond was elected Chief of the Cree Nation of Waskaganish at the age of 21. On November 11, 1975, he signed The James Bay and Northern Quebec Agreement with the Canadian government. Using funds from the settlement, he created Air Creebec, Cree Construction Company Limited, and Cree Yamaha Motors. For his outstanding achievements, Billy Diamond was appointed as a Chevalier into the Ordre National du Quebec in 1987. On March 19, 1990, Diamond was a guest on 100 Huntley Street.

Diamond died at the age of 61 from a heart attack. In accordance with his instructions, his tombstone reads: "Gone to a meeting - will return."

== Early life ==
Billy Diamond was born to Hilda and Malcolm Diamond on May 17, 1949, in a tent near Rupert House, Quebec, on the shore of James Bay. He grew up in the Cree Nation of Waskaganish (then Rupert House) until being forced to attend Bishop Horden Hall, a residential school in Moose Factory, Ontario. Diamond recalled that his hair was cut for the first time in his life immediately upon arrival, and the clothes his mother gave him were confiscated. Additionally, the students were punished if they attempted to communicate to each other in Cree. Despite these circumstances, Diamond achieved leadership awards while becoming interested in a variety of academic topics. As a teenager, he attended high school in Sault Ste. Marie, Ontario, where he organized an Indian Students Council.

== Political career ==
Diamond returned to Waskaganish after high school, serving as the Band Manager during the 1960s. Although he personally hoped to attend law school, Diamond followed his father's wishes and successfully ran for Chief. He was elected in 1970 at 21 years old, the youngest Chief in Canada at that time. He helped to establish the Grand Council of the Crees in 1974, of which he was elected Grand Chief at age 23. As such, he represented Quebec Crees in the Assembly of First Nations. Diamond also helped to negotiate Sections 25 and 35 of the Canadian Charter of Rights and Freedoms from 1980 to 1983.

== Legacy ==
=== The James Bay and Northern Quebec Agreement ===
In 1971, Premier Robert Bourassa announced that $6 billion hydroelectric dam would be built on the Eastmain River in Cree and Inuit territory, which he coined the "project of the century". The project was planned without consulting Cree and Inuit stakeholders, and would have flooded traditional Cree and Inuit hunting grounds. Diamond organized a meeting of James Bay Crees to discuss the urgency of this project, wherein they decided to challenge the government legally. Initially, the court ruling in favour of the Inuit and Cree case was overturned. However, Diamond and other Indigenous activists such as the Northern Quebec Inuit Association were able to secure an out-of-court settlement with Hydro Quebec now known as the James Bay and Northern Quebec Agreement (JBNQA) in 1975. This agreement allowed an altered hydroelectric project to be built in exchange for solidified land rights and financial compensation. The JBNQA is considered the first "Modern Treaty" and provided the James Bay Cree and Inuit with $225 million in compensation, in addition to investment infrastructure.

=== Air Creebec ===
Diamond established Air Creebec in 1982, and served as its president. The airline fulfills Diamond's vision of allowing the people of James Bay greater mobility, connecting coastal communities to larger urban centres such as Timmins, Val D'or, and Montreal. To this day, it is entirely Cree-owned.

== Personal life ==
Billy Diamond and his wife Elizabeth had six children. Later in life, he became a devout Christian.
