= Eastmain River Airport =

Airport in Eastmain, Quebec, Canada

- IATA: ZEM; ICAO: CZEM

Summary
- Airport type: Public
- Operator: Transport Canada; Cree Nation of Eastmain
- Location: Eastmain, Quebec
- Time zone: EST (UTC−05:00)
  - Summer (DST): EDT (UTC−04:00)
- Elevation AMSL: 24 ft (7.3 m)
- Coordinates: 52°13′35″N 078°31′21″W

Map
- Location in Quebec CZEM (Canada)

Runways
Direction	Length		Surface
Direction	ft	m	Surface
02/20	3,512	1,070	Gravel

Statistics (2010)
- Aircraft movements: 137
- Source: Canada Flight Supplement; Movements from Statistics Canada

Eastmain River Airport (IATA: ZEM, ICAO: CZEM), is located 1 nautical mile (1.9 km; 1.2 mi) southwest of Eastmain, Quebec, Canada.

== Airlines and destinations ==
Airlines	Destinations
Air Creebec	Chisasibi, Kuujjuarapik, Montreal–Trudeau, Val-d'Or, Waskaganish, Wemindji
