= Chisasibi Airport =

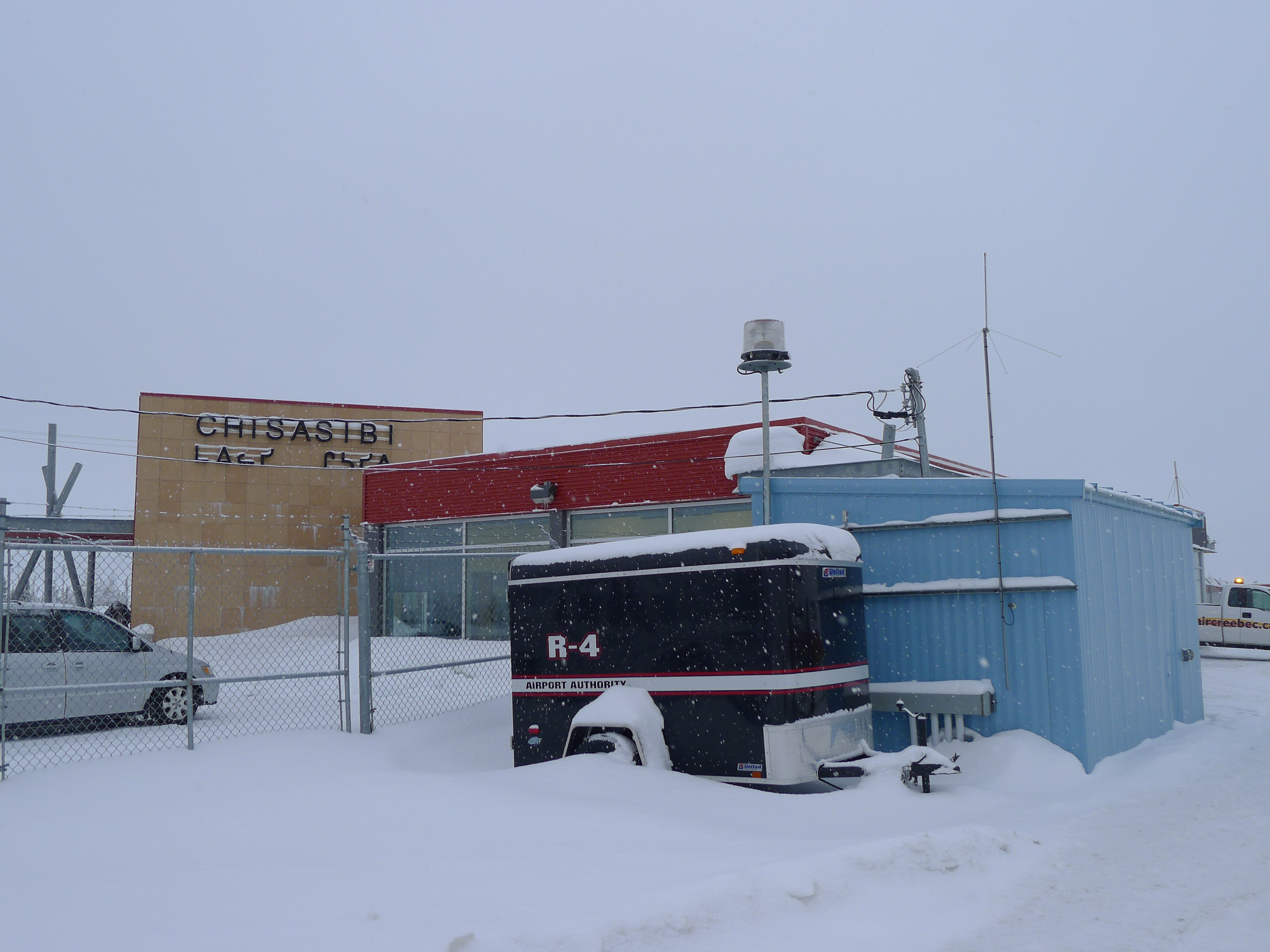
- IATA: YKU; ICAO: none; TC LID: CSU2

Summary
- Airport type: Public
- Operator: Nation Cri de Chisasibi
- Location: Chisasibi, Quebec
- Time zone: EST (UTC−05:00)
  - Summer (DST): EDT (UTC−04:00)
- Elevation AMSL: 43 ft / 13 m
- Coordinates: 53°48′21″N 078°55′01″W

Map
- Location in Quebec

Runways
Direction	Length		Surface
Direction	ft	m	Surface
14/32	3,793	1,156	Gravel
- Source: Canada Flight Supplement

Chisasibi Airport (IATA: YKU, TC LID: CSU2) is located 1.7 nautical miles (3.1 km; 2.0 mi) northwest of Chisasibi, Quebec, Canada.

== Airlines and destinations ==
Airlines	Destinations
Air Creebec	Eastmain, Kuujjuarapik, Montréal–Trudeau, Val-d'Or, Waskaganish, Wemindji
