= Wemindji Airport =

Airport in Wemindji, Quebec, Canada

- IATA: YNC; ICAO: CYNC

Summary
- Airport type: Public
- Operator: Transport Canada
- Location: Wemindji, Quebec
- Time zone: EST (UTC−05:00)
  - Summer (DST): EDT (UTC−04:00)
- Elevation AMSL: 66 ft (20 m)
- Coordinates: 53°00′38″N 078°49′52″W

Map
- Location in Quebec

Runways
| Direction | Length | | Surface |
| Direction | ft | m | Surface |
|---|---|---|---|
| 10/28 | 3,511 | 1,070 | Gravel |

Statistics (2018)
- Aircraft movements: 1,605
- Source: Canada Flight Supplement; Movements from Statistics Canada

Wemindji Airport (IATA: YNC, ICAO: CYNC) is located near the town of Wemindji, Quebec, Canada.

== Airlines and destinations ==
| Airlines | Destinations |
|---|---|
| Air Creebec | Chisasibi, Eastmain, Kuujjuarapik, Montreal–Trudeau, Val-d'Or, Waskaganish |
