= Montréal–Trudeau International Airport =

Airport in Dorval, Quebec, Canada

Montréal–Trudeau International Airport Aéroport International Montréal-Trudeau

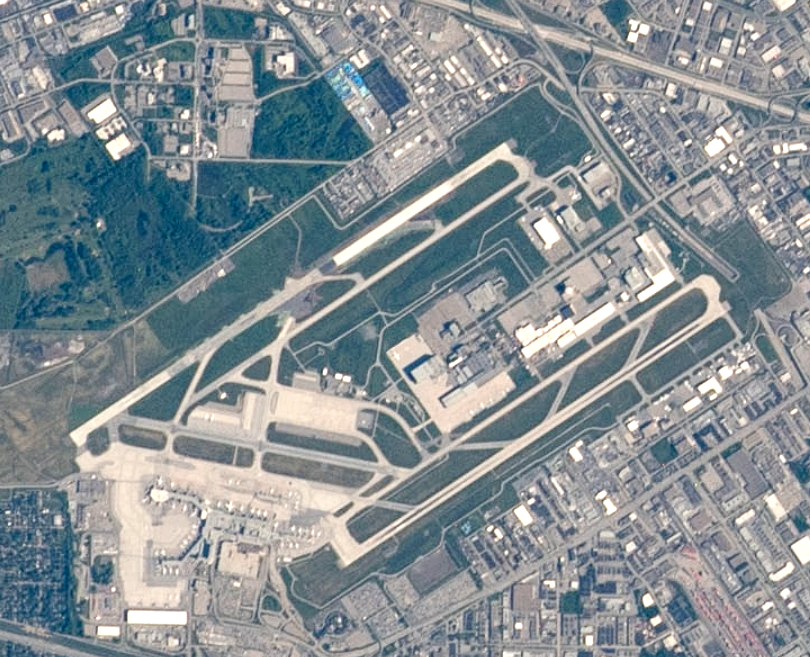
- Aerial view in 2022
- IATA: YUL; ICAO: CYUL; WMO: 71627

Summary
- Airport type: Public
- Owner: Transport Canada
- Operator: Aéroports de Montréal
- Location: Dorval / Montreal, Quebec, Canada
- Opened: September 1, 1941; 85 years ago
- Hub for: Air Canada; Air Creebec; Air Transat
- Focus city for: Porter Airlines; WestJet
- Operating base for: Air Inuit; PAL Airlines
- Time zone: EST (UTC−05:00)
  - Summer (DST): EDT (UTC−04:00)
- Elevation AMSL: 120 ft (37 m)
- Coordinates: 45°28′14″N 073°44′27″W
- Public transit access: 209 Des Sources / YUL Aéroport; 214 Stuart-Graham / YUL Aéroport; 356 ☾ Lachine / YUL Aéroport / Des Sources; 378 ☾ Sauvé / YUL Aéroport; 460 Express Métropolitaine; 747 ✈ YUL Aéroport Montréal-Trudeau / Centre-Ville; YUL–Aéroport-Montréal–Trudeau (future)
- Website: www.admtl.com/en

Maps
- Airport diagram
- Interactive map of Montréal–Trudeau International Airport

Runways
Direction	Length		Surface
Direction	ft	m	Surface
06L/24R	11,000	3,353	Concrete
06R/24L	9,890	3,014	Concrete

Statistics (2025)
- Passengers: 22,364,685
- Aircraft movements: 206,648
- Sources: Canada Flight Supplement and Transport Canada; Environment Canada; Passenger traffic and movements from Aéroports de Montréal

Montréal–Trudeau International Airport (IATA: YUL, ICAO: CYUL) (French: Aéroport International Montréal-Trudeau) or Montréal–Trudeau, formerly known and still commonly referred to as Montréal–Dorval International Airport (Aéroport international Montréal-Dorval), is an international airport straddling the border of Dorval and Montreal, Quebec, Canada. It is the only Transport Canada designated international airport serving Montreal and is situated 15 km (9.3 mi) west of Downtown Montreal. The airport terminals are located entirely in the suburb of Dorval, while one runway is located in the Montreal borough of Saint-Laurent. Air Canada, the country's flag carrier, also has its corporate headquarters complex on the Saint-Laurent side of the airport. It also serves Greater Montreal and adjacent regions in Quebec and eastern Ontario, as well as the states of Vermont and northern New York in the United States. The airport is named in honour of Pierre Trudeau (1919–2000), the 15th Prime Minister of Canada.

The airport is one of two managed and operated by Aéroports de Montréal (ADM), a not-for-profit corporation without share capital; the other is Montréal–Mirabel northwest of Montreal, which was initially intended to replace the one in Dorval but now deals almost solely with cargo and private flights. Montréal–Trudeau is owned by Transport Canada which has a 60-year lease with Aéroports de Montréal, as per Canada's National Airport Policy of 1994.

Trudeau is the busiest airport in the province of Quebec and the third-busiest airport in Canada by passenger traffic, with 22.4 million passengers in 2025. It is one of nine Canadian airports with United States border preclearance and is one of the main gateways into Canada with 15.79 million or 71% of its passengers being on non-domestic flights, the highest proportion amongst Canada's airports. YUL has also risen to become the 5th busiest transatlantic hub in North America. The route between Montreal and Paris is Canada's busiest international route and the 6th busiest international route from North America, with more than 1.5 million passengers a year. It is one of three Air Canada hubs and, in that capacity, serves mainly Quebec, the Atlantic Provinces and Eastern Ontario. On an average day, 58,000 passengers transit through Montréal-Trudeau.

Airlines servicing Trudeau offer year-round non-stop flights to five continents, namely Africa, Asia, Europe, North and South America. It is one of only two airports in Canada with non-stop flights to five continents, the other being Toronto Pearson International Airport. Trudeau airport is the headquarters of and a large hub for Air Canada, the country's largest airline. It is also the headquarters of Air Inuit and Air Transat, and an operation base for Porter Airlines. It also plays a role in general aviation as home to the headquarters of Innotech-Execair, Starlink, ACASS and Maintenance Repair & Overhaul (MRO) facilities of Air Transat and Air Inuit. Transport Canada operates a Civil Aviation Maintenance, Repair and Overhaul facility on site, with a fleet of Government owned and operated civil aircraft. Bombardier Aerospace has an assembly facility on site where they build Global and Challenger business jets.

== History ==
=== Growth ===
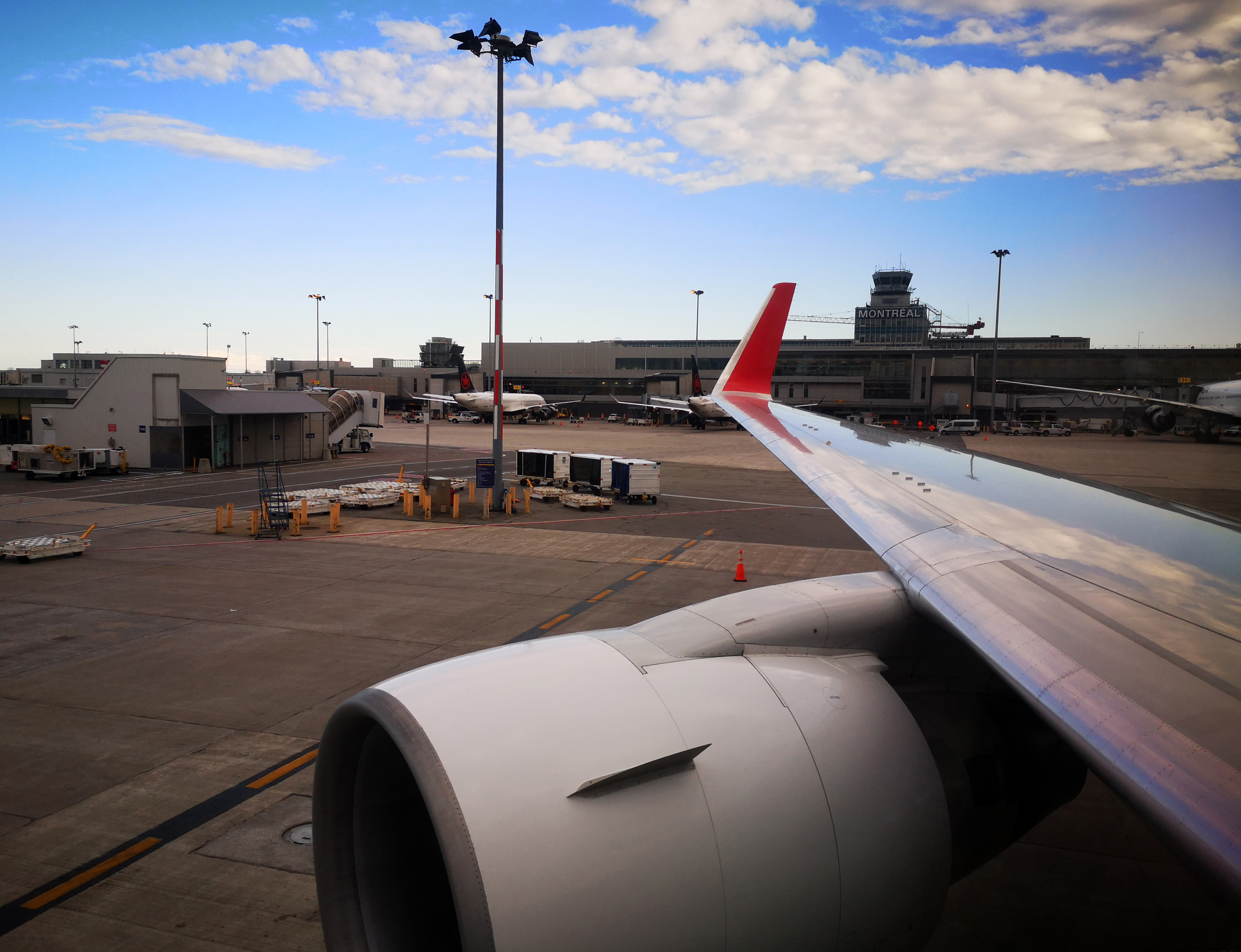
Montréal–Trudeau's original terminal building viewed from airside

In November 1960, the airport was renamed Montreal–Dorval International Airport/Aéroport international Dorval de Montréal. On December 15 of that year the Minister of Transport inaugurated a new $30 million terminal. The structure was built by Illsley, Templeton, Archibald, and Larose. At its height, it was the largest terminal in Canada and one of the biggest in the world. It was the gateway to Canada for all European air traffic and served more than two million passengers per year. Eight years later, Montréal–Dorval International Airport underwent a major expansion program. Despite this, the government of Prime Minister of Canada Pierre Elliott Trudeau (who represented a Montreal riding) predicted that Dorval would be completely saturated by 1985 and also projected that 20 million passengers would be passing through Montreal's airports annually. They decided to construct a new airport in Sainte-Scholastique, what became Montréal–Mirabel International Airport. As the first phase in the transition that would eventually have seen Dorval closed, all international flights (except those to and from the United States) were to be transferred to the new airport in 1975.

=== The opening and closing of Mirabel Airport ===
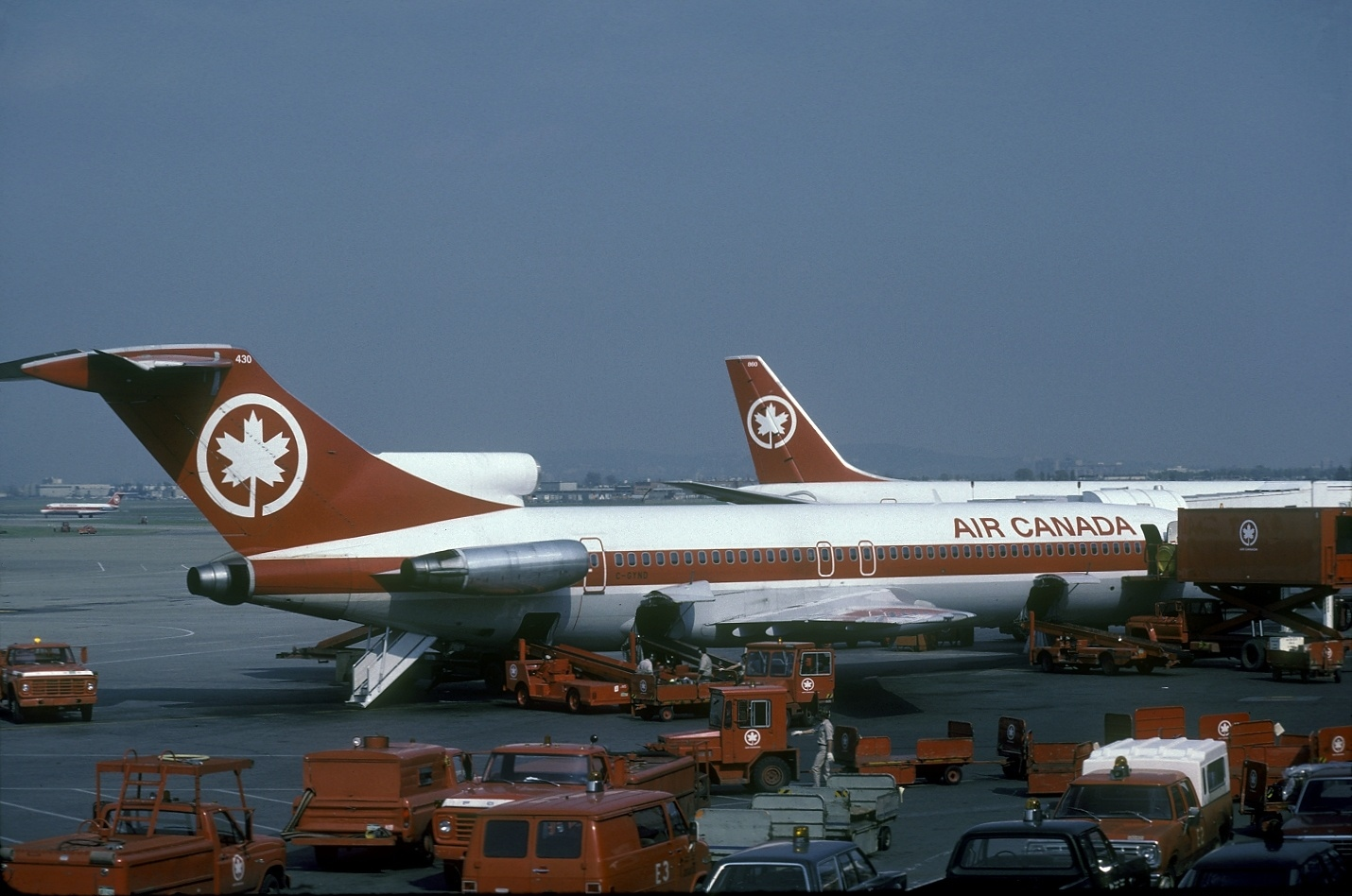
Air Canada airplanes parked at the old aeroquay in 1982

The Trudeau government had developed Mirabel Airport to handle an expected growth in international traffic and eventually, to replace Dorval. On November 29, 1975, Mirabel International Airport went into service. With an operations zone of 70 km^{2} (27 sq mi) and a buffer zone of 290 km^{2} (110 sq mi), it became the largest airport in the world. Many connecting flights to Canadian centres were transferred to Mirabel and 23 international airlines moved their overseas activities there. As a consequence, Montréal–Dorval was repurposed to serve domestic flights and transborder flights to the United States, to eventually shift these activities to Mirabel in the future and lead to Dorval's closure for redevelopment.

However, the extra traffic never materialized. Mirabel's traffic decreased due to the advent in the 1980s of longer-range jets that did not need to refuel in Montreal before crossing the Atlantic Ocean from the major Western North American cities. Montreal's economic decline in the late 1970s and 1980s also had a significant effect on both airports' traffic, which made Mirabel's additional capacity redundant. Although this redundancy would have been resolved if Dorval was decommissioned as originally intended, public pressure supported Dorval's continued operation due to its closer proximity to downtown Montreal at 20 km (12 mi) instead of 58 km (36 mi) for Mirabel. Another obstacle of the planned transfer from Dorval to Mirabel was Air Canada's desire to keep flights in Dorval with its proximity to AVEOS workshops.

In particular, the simultaneous operation of Mirabel (international flights) and Dorval (continental flights) made Montreal less attractive to international airlines. Passengers who used Montreal in transit had to take long bus rides for connections from domestic to international flights (exacerbated by the partially-completed road links and non-existent rail connecting Mirabel to Montreal), unnecessarily complicating their journeys, while Montrealers grew to resent Mirabel as they were forced to travel far out of town for international flights. Faced with the stark economic reality of operating two Canadian points of entry, most international airlines opted to bypass Montreal altogether in favour of Toronto which enjoyed a single major airport at Pearson handling domestic and international flights. Although Dorval resumed handling international flights in 1997, international airlines were slow to return as they were content having established Toronto Pearson as their eastern Canadian gateway.

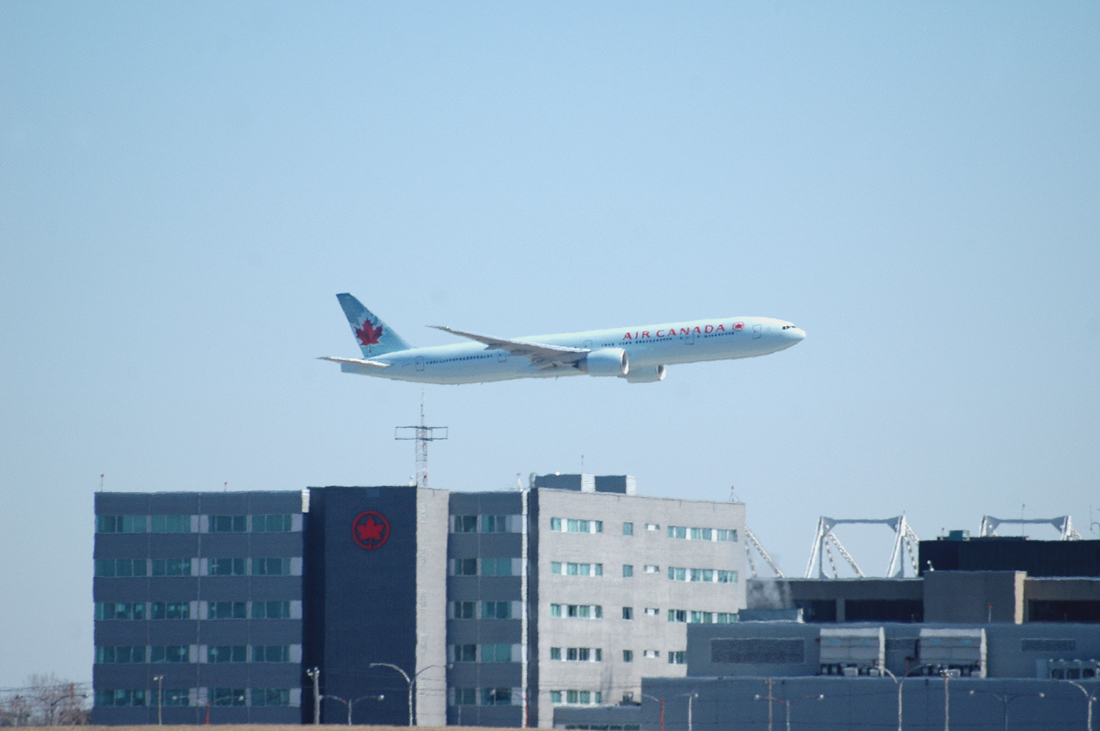
An Air Canada Boeing 777-300ER performing a fly past, with Air Canada's corporate headquarters in foreground, in 2007

=== Back to Montréal–Dorval, renaissance ===
With all international scheduled flights returning to Montréal–Dorval in 1997, as well as charter flights in 2004, the consolidation of flights to Montréal–Dorval resulted in an increase in passenger traffic. Besides the transfer of flights, Montréal–Dorval International Airport could resume being a true hub for passengers in-transit, and those from continental flights would no longer have to travel to Mirabel to connect to international flights and vice versa. Nonetheless, this was insufficient to woo back international airlines who had already switched their eastern Canadian gateway to Toronto Pearson a decade ago.

Starting as Dorval Airport, then Montréal–Dorval International Airport, the airport was renamed Montréal–Pierre Elliott Trudeau International Airport in Trudeau's honour on January 1, 2004, by the federal government. The renaming had been announced in September 2003 by then Minister of Transport David Collenette. This move provoked some opposition, especially Quebec sovereigntists opposed to Trudeau's staunchly federalist policies. The renaming also provoked opposition from many aviation historians and enthusiasts who recalled Trudeau's role in the effort to shutter Dorval in favour of the much larger and modern Mirabel Airport, of which he was the greatest instigator of its construction. Many Montrealers still refer to Trudeau airport as "Dorval," or "Dorval Airport."

=== Operation Yellow Ribbon ===
After the September 11 attacks, Dorval Airport participated in Operation Yellow Ribbon, taking in seven diverted flights that had been bound for the closed airspace over the United States, even though pilots were asked to avoid the airport as a security measure. Mirabel International Airport also took in 10 other diverted flights totalling 17 diverted flight in the Montreal area bound for American cities.

=== 75th anniversary ===
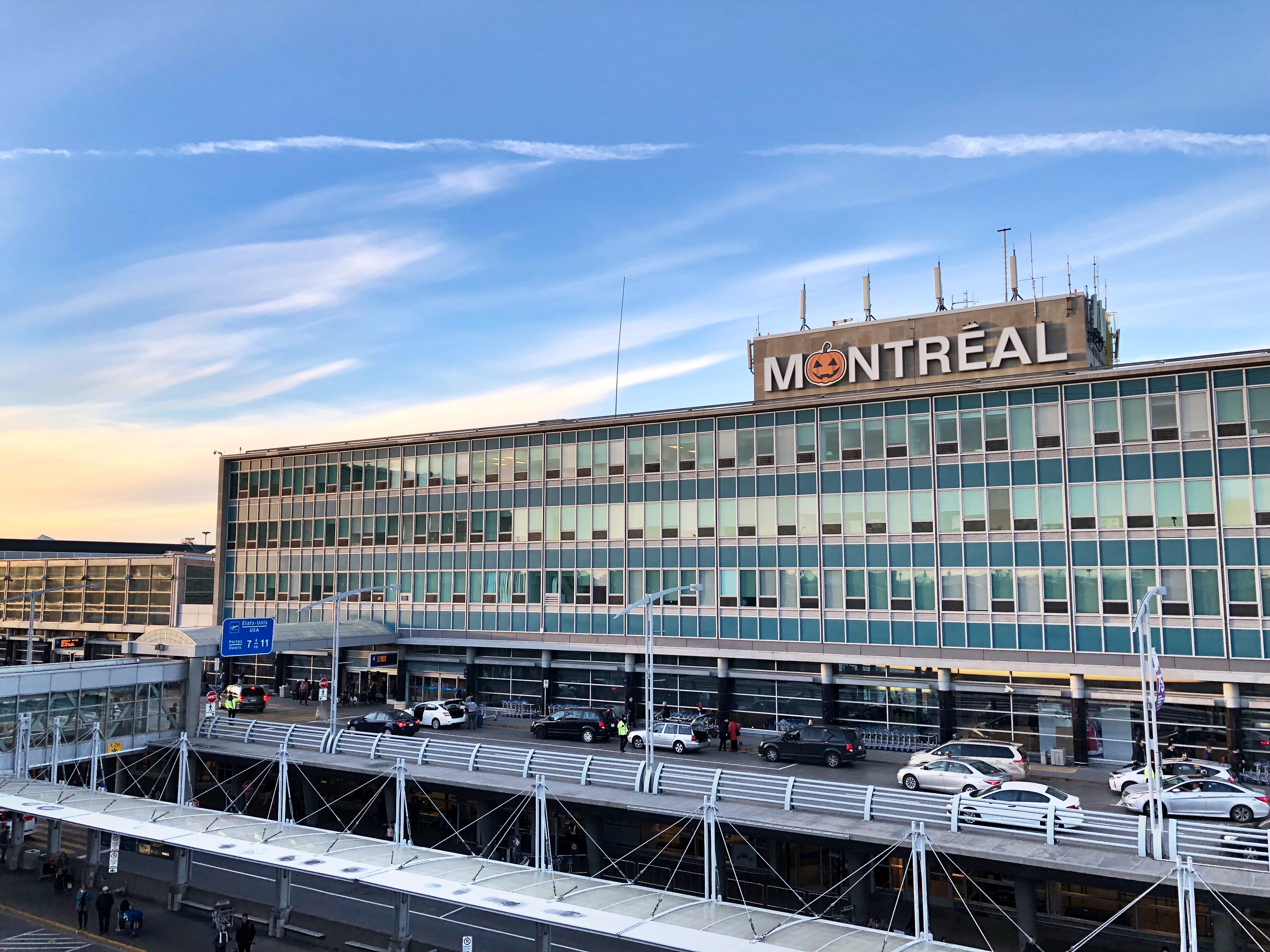
Terminal facade in October 2018

In 2016, Montréal-Trudeau celebrated its 75th anniversary. Under the theme Service, Destinations, Passion since 1941, various activities and contests were planned throughout the year. In partnership with the Canada Aviation and Space Museum, the airport hosted the Travelling Through Time exhibition in the public hall of the US Departures area. Exhibits showcasing important milestones in the airport's history were incorporated throughout the terminal.

== Expansion ==
=== Terminal expansion (2000–2007) ===
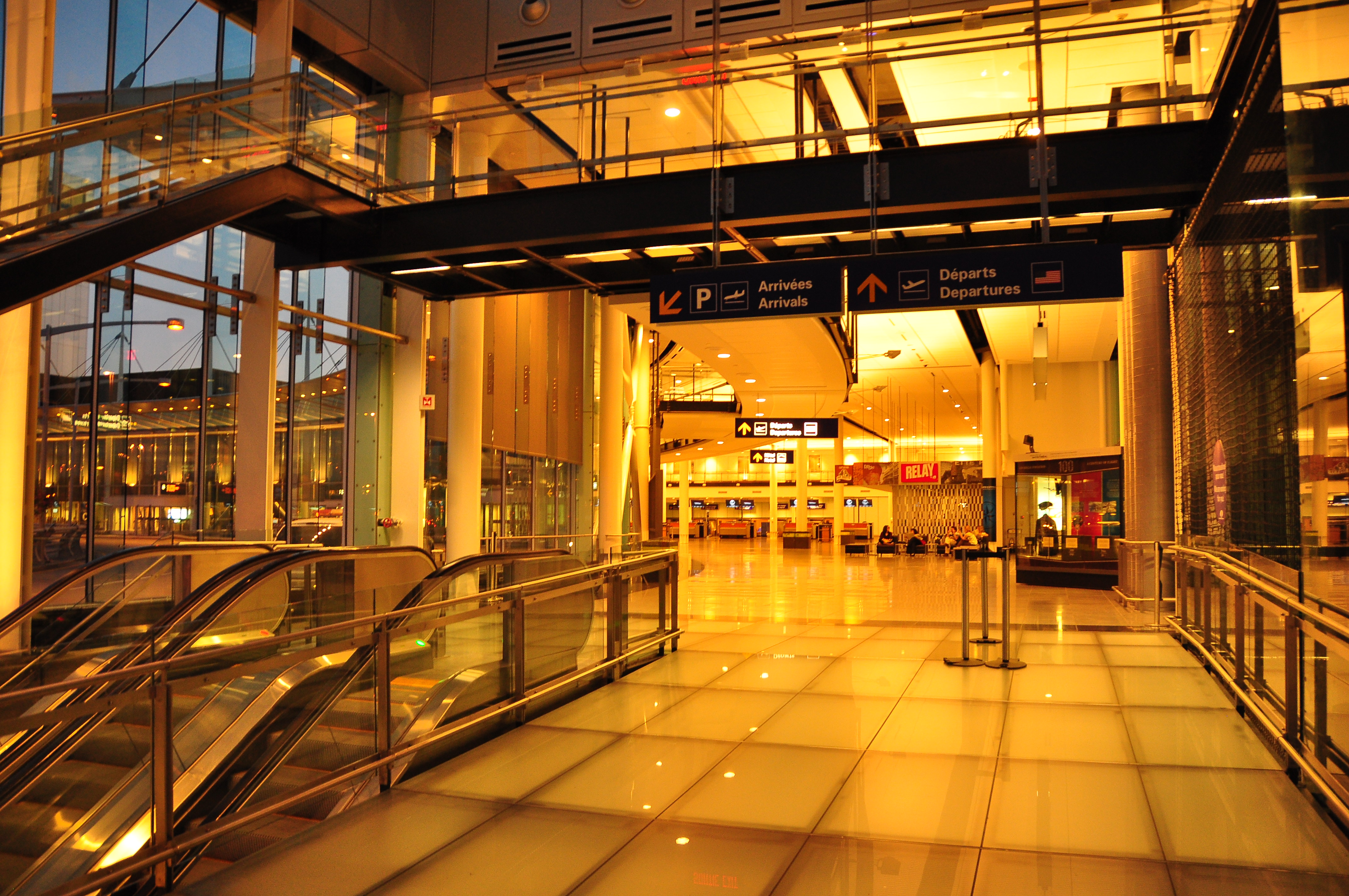
Departures area

Montréal–Trudeau underwent a major expansion and modernization designed to increase the terminal's capacity and substantially enhance the level of passenger service. In February 2000, with a budget of CAD 716 million, ADM announced plans for an extensive expansion plan that would bring Montréal–Trudeau up to standard with other North American airports its size. The airport terminal had for the most part remained the same, with the exception of minor renovations, since its opening in 1960. With increased passenger volume resulting from the transfer of international scheduled passengers from Mirabel Airport in 1997, as well as Air Canada's intentions to make Montréal–Trudeau its Eastern Canada hub, there was a strong need to greatly expand the terminal, whose capacity of roughly 7 million passengers per year had been exceeded.

The expansion program included the construction of several brand-new facilities, including a jetty for flights to the United States (US Preclearance Terminal), another for other international destinations (International Terminal) and a huge international arrivals complex. An 18-gate Transborder Concourse opened in 2003, an 11-gate International Concourse opened in 2004, new customs hall and baggage claim area for non-domestic flights and an expanded parking garage opened in 2005. Additionally, sections of the domestic area were renovated and expanded in 2007, accompanied with additional retail space. The International part of the Aeroquay satellite was demolished in 2008, leaving the domestic part for regional carriers. The completion of the CAD 716 million expansion gives Montréal–Trudeau the ability to serve 15 million passengers a year. This ironically accomplished one of the goals that was to be met with the construction of Mirabel. (In the 1970s, the federal government projected that 20 million passengers would be passing through Montreal's airports annually by 1985, with 17 million through Mirabel). Aéroports de Montréal financed all of these improvements itself, with no government grants. By the end of 2007, CAD 1.5 billion had been spent to upgrade Montréal–Trudeau.

The last round of construction in this phase was to allow the airport to accommodate the Airbus A380. Gate 55, part of the international jetty, was designed for the requirements of the A380. It is equipped with two air bridges to load and unload passengers on both decks of the A380 simultaneously. With Phase II of the international jetty expansion now completed, the airport has two additional A380 gates, although there are currently no airlines operating this type of aircraft at the airport.

=== New hotel, transborder terminal expansion and modernization (2006–2009) ===
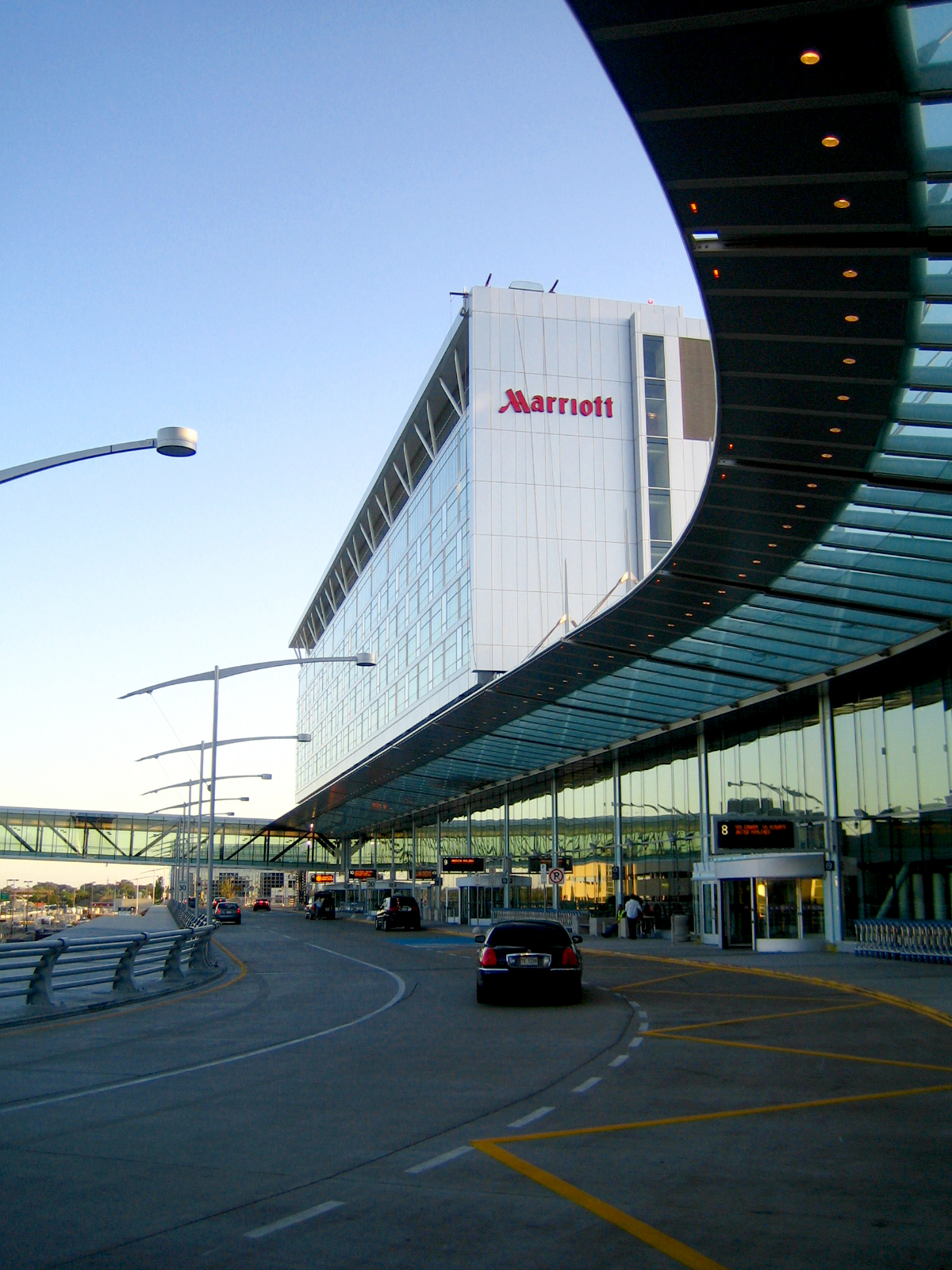
The new Marriott hotel and U.S. departures wing

On June 15, 2006, construction began on a new four-star Marriott hotel at the airport, above the transborder terminal. Originally scheduled to be completed by September 2008, the 279 first-class room hotel opened its doors on August 19, 2009. Construction was slowed down because of the recession and a collapse in the Transborder market. It contains an underground train station that was planned to eventually connect the airport with downtown Montreal as well as ADM's corporate headquarters.

On the same day, Montreal–Trudeau airport opened the doors to the refurbished, expanded, modernized and user-friendly transborder terminal, meeting the industry's highest standards. This increased the total area of the terminal from 9,320 to 18,122 m^{2} (100,320 to 195,060 sq ft). Furthermore, the terminal is equipped with a new baggage sorting room which allows U.S. customs officers to retrieve luggage for secondary inspection.

=== International terminal expansion (2011–2016) ===
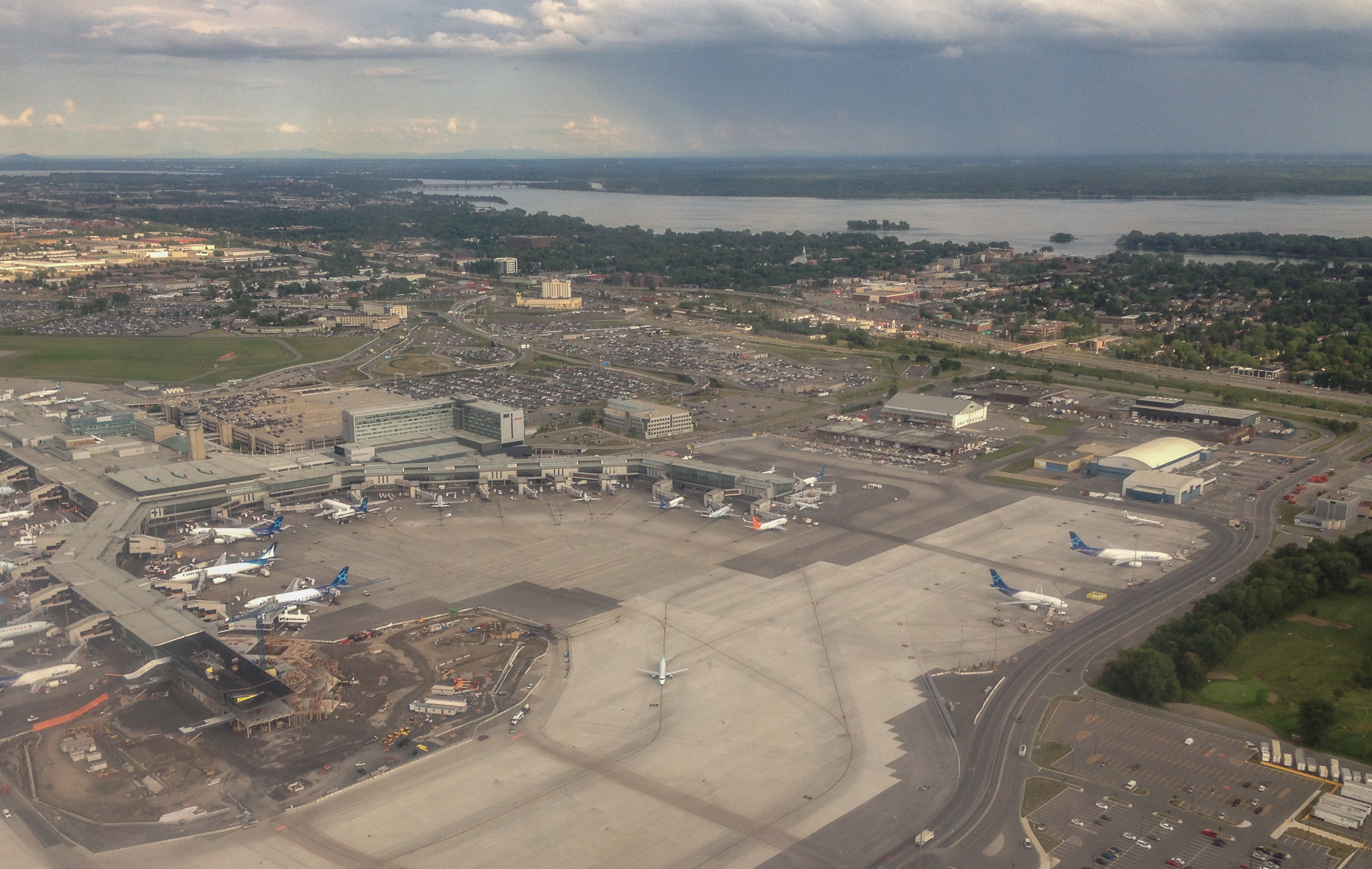
Overview of the international and transborder jetties during the expansion project in 2014

Air France became the first operator of the type in Montreal on April 22, 2011, when they officially launched their daily A380 service from Paris. A380 service was reduced to 4 weekly flights during summer 2012 and withdrawn in October 2012, due to low demand for business class and a high level of competition, with Air Canada, Air Transat and Corsair also operating Montreal–Paris flights.

In July 2011, James Cherry, the CEO of Aéroports de Montréal, announced the construction of a two-phase expansion of Montréal–Trudeau's international terminal. The total cost of the project, now completed, has been around $620 million.

Phase I of this project, which was completed on December 20, 2012, opened a new boarding lounge which can accommodate as many as 420 passengers, along with a new gate, numbered 62. It was officially completed at a cost of $270 million. The new gate can accommodate three Passenger Transfer Vehicles, allowing passengers to be transferred from the terminal to an aircraft parked on a remote stand nearby. When phase II of the expansion began in 2014, this gate was closed to passengers. It was reopened with the inauguration of the extension two years later.

Phase II of the project, which was officially inaugurated on May 10, 2016, and put into service two days after, added six new contact gates for wide-body jets, including two for the Airbus A380, increasing the total number of contact gates from 10 to 16. This expansion holds gates 63 through 68. The area has 20,000 m^{2} of open spaces, restaurants, shops and a children's playground area. It took two years to complete and opened four months ahead of the original schedule for a total cost of $350 million. It was conceived by Humà Design and integrates three massive art installations and four vitrines showcasing Montreal's museums. The extension of the international jetty was built to alleviate the high level of congestion on the tarmac and in the terminal.

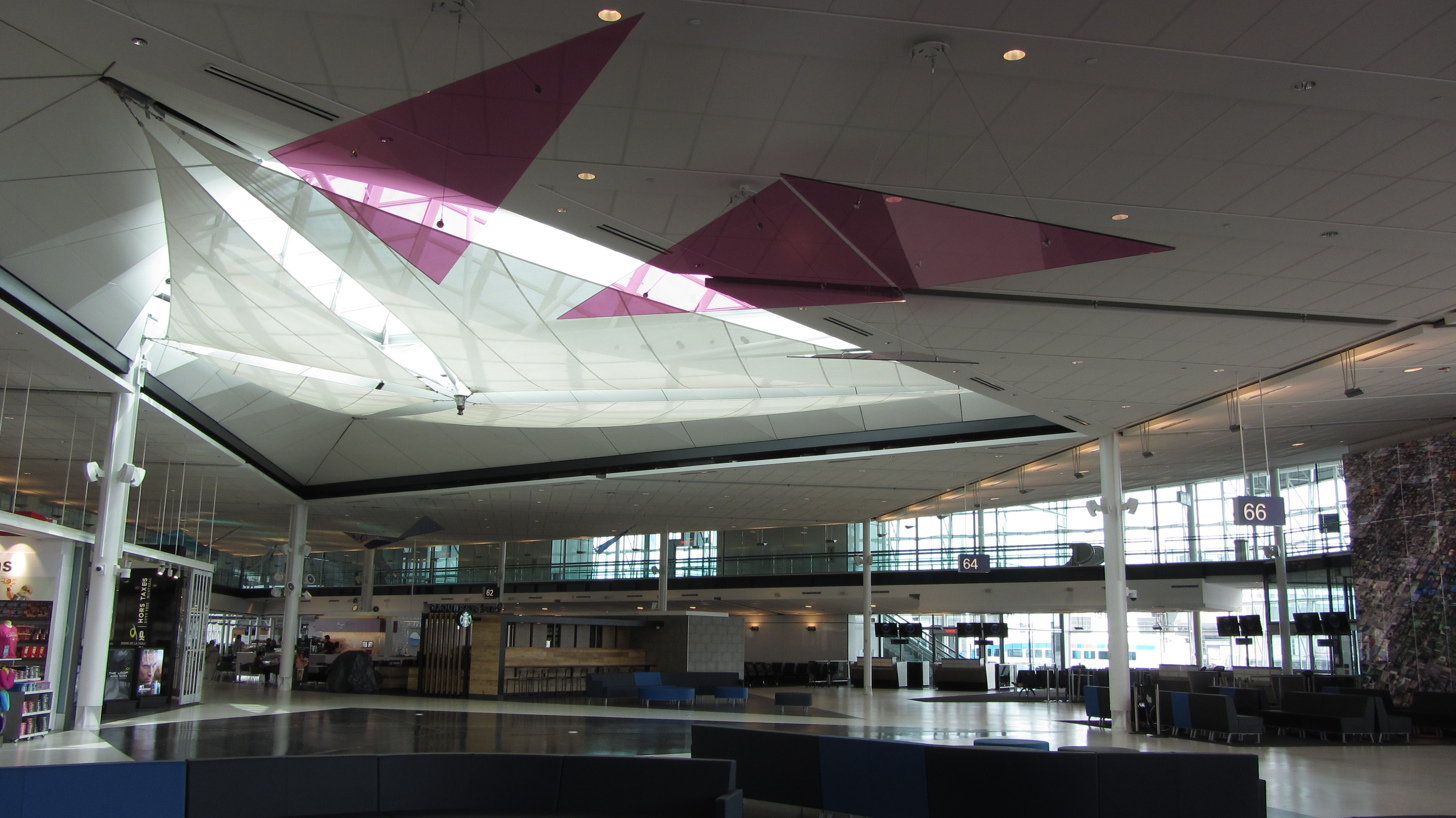
The newly built expansion of the international jetty

Apart from these expansions, ADM inaugurated in April 2016, a commercial area between gate 52 and 53. This area is called Haltes gourmandes (English: gourmet stops) referring to the large number of restaurants located there. The new restaurants are all owned by SSP Canada Food Service Inc. They operate 12 locations in the terminal, managing a total of 4000 m^{2} of terminal area. SSP invested over $200 million throughout 2016 in its airport locations.

=== Future projects (2018–2030) ===
In January 2016, ADM published a call for tenders on their website regarding the restoration and upgrade of the curtain wall of the main façade on the terminal. This part of the airport is one of the oldest remaining parts of the original terminal.

Also, according to the 2013–2033 master plan from ADM, the following future developments are in the works:

- Increase in the capacity of the passenger curb-side areas
- Development of a network of taxiways in the centre-west portion of the airport to support the development of a new air cargo handling area and an industrial development zone
- Reconfiguration of the international arrivals hall and of the domestic and international departures luggage room
- Extension of the transborder jetty and addition of a remote parking area

On April 30, 2018, a massive new expansion project was unveiled that will last until 2030. The first phase ($2.5 billion) will see the airport's multi-level parking lot demolished and rebuilt with a green roof and the YUL–Aéroport-Montréal–Trudeau REM station underneath. The drop-off area will be greatly expanded and covered with glass, and a new remote terminal will be built where runway 10/28 used to stand. By 2030, the remote terminal will be connected via future phases to the current terminal building to handle the expected growth. ADM CEO Philippe Rainville stated "the airport's growth has been about double the international average in recent years [so the] goal is to meet the growth projections of the airport."

== Infrastructure ==
=== Runways ===
There are currently two runways in operation at Montréal-Trudeau: two parallel concrete runways aligned in a northeast–southwest direction (06L/24R and 06R/24L). There was another single runway in an east–west direction (10/28), but it was permanently decommissioned in July 2023. The former runway is now a taxiway and will continue to be used as such.

Number	Length	Width	ILS	Alignment
06L/24R	11,000 ft (3,400 m)	200 ft (61 m)	Cat. II (6L), Cat. I (24R)	Northeast-southwest
06R/24L	9,890 ft (3,010 m)	200 ft (61 m)	Cat. I (both directions)	Northeast-southwest

=== Terminal ===
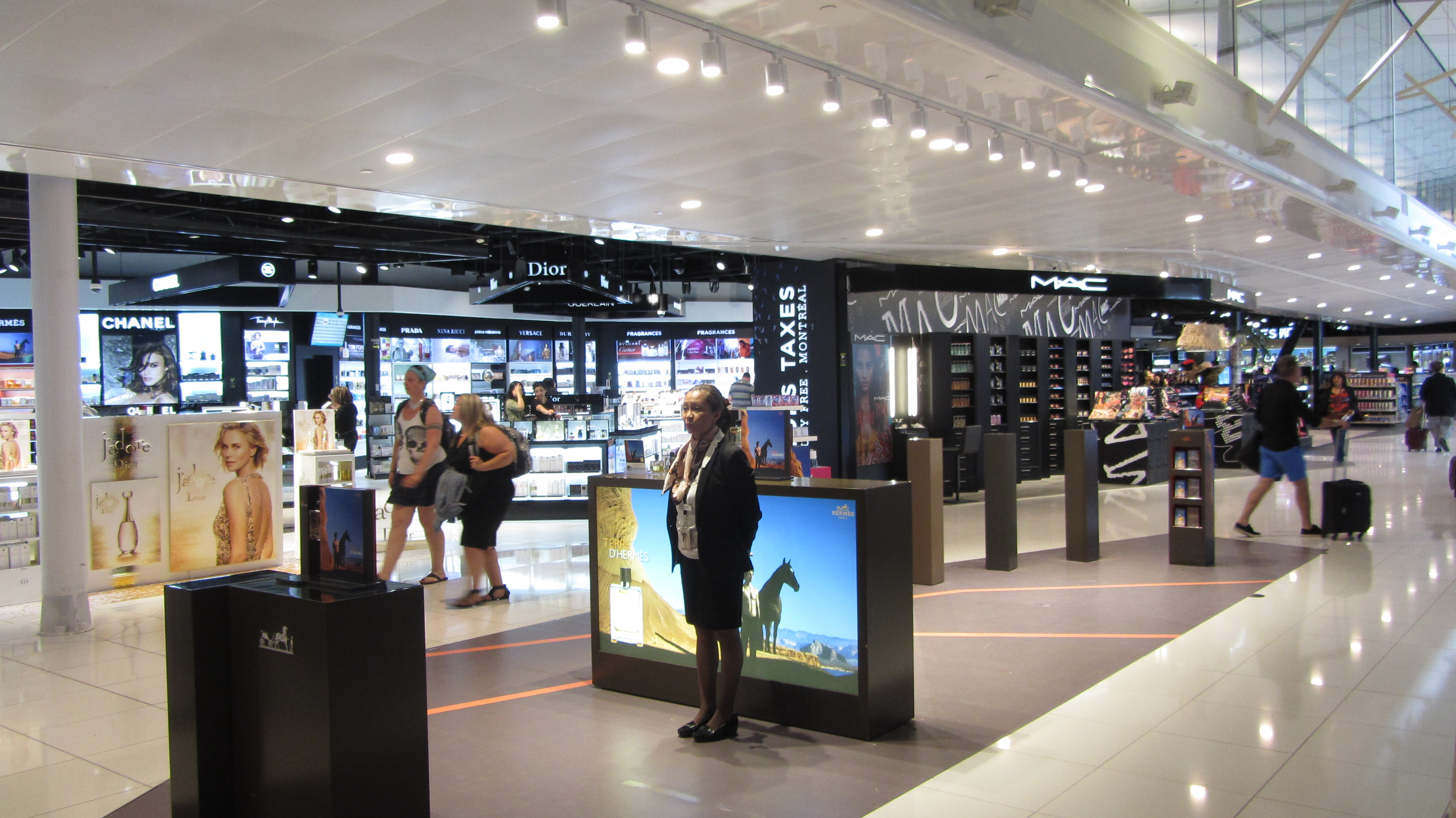
One of the biggest duty-free shops in Canada, The Loop, seen here near gate 51

==== Mobile lounges ====
Mobile lounge waiting before connecting to plane, in lowered position

The airport has eight mobile lounges that are used to shuttle passengers from the terminal to a plane parked at a remote hardstand spot.

==== Domestic jetty ====
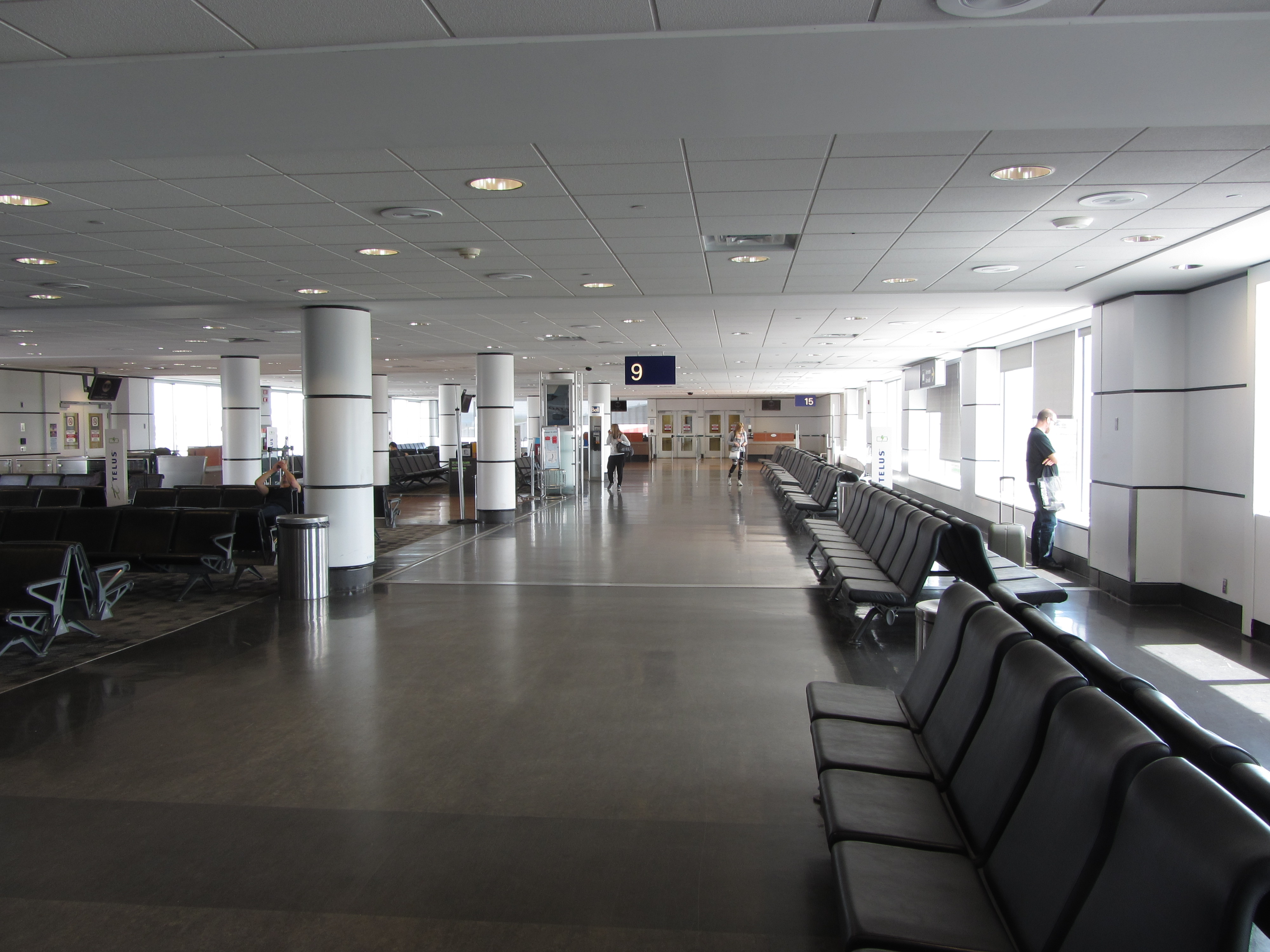
The far end of the domestic jetty on a quiet afternoon

The domestic jetty, which is accessible via security checkpoint A, is divided into two parts: a satellite jetty connected by a tunnel to the main terminal and a wing attached to the main terminal building. The main jetty holds 16 gates: 1 through 12, 15, and 47 through 49. The satellite jetty holds another 10 gates: 17, 19, 21, 23, 25, 27, 28, 30, 32 and 34. There are only two boarding bridges located inside the satellite (17 and 21) as the other gates are mostly used for prop aircraft like the Bombardier Dash 8 family. These parts of the airport are the only departure areas remaining that were part of the original terminal.

==== International jetty ====
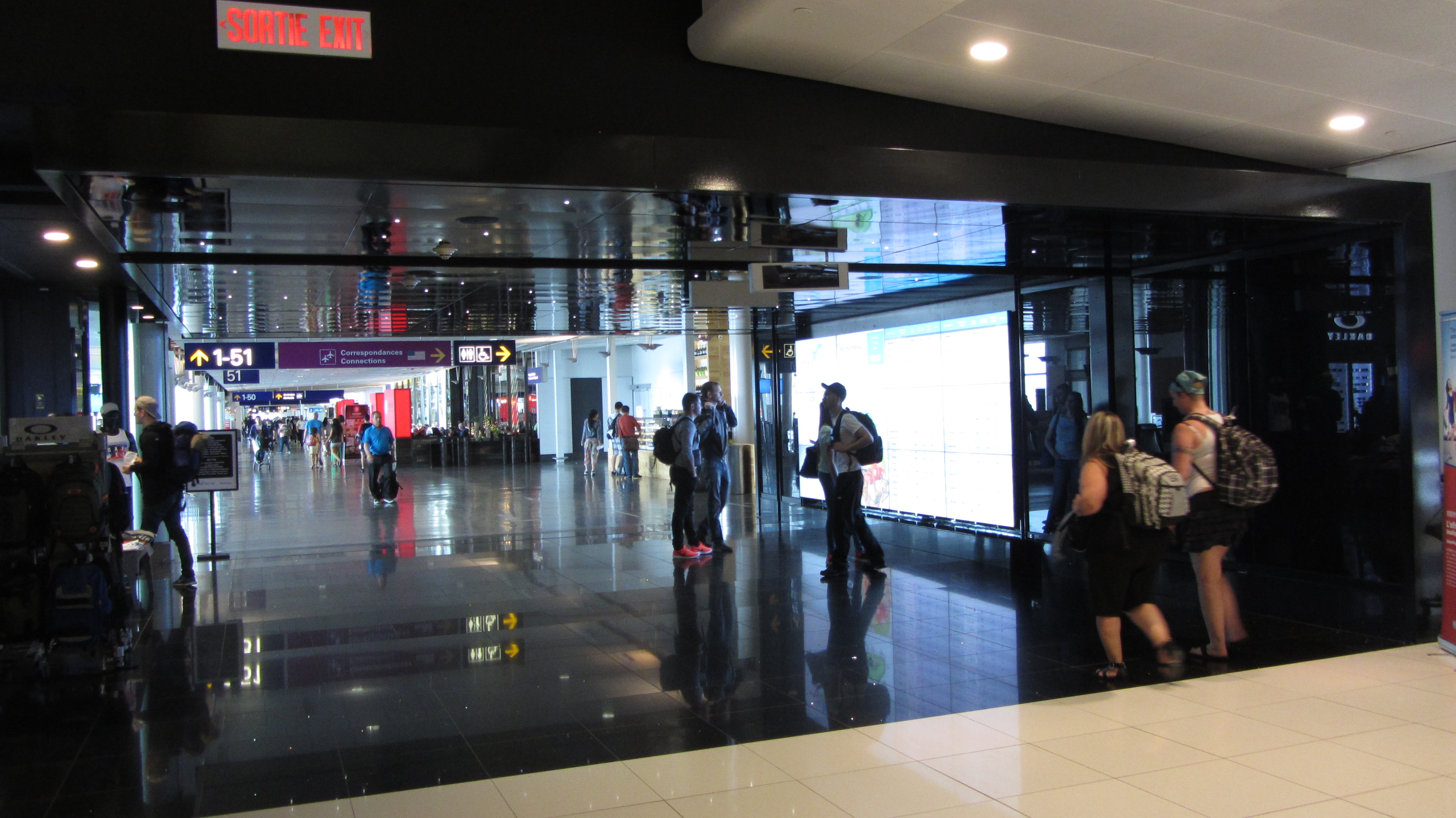
The international jetty near The Loop

The International jetty, also accessible via the security checkpoint A, is dedicated to flights with destinations outside Canada and United States. This jetty holds 18 gates: 50 through 53 and 55 through 68. Gates 53 and 62 are used exclusively for Passenger Transfer Vehicles. In this area, travellers can shop, eat and relax with a wide varieties of boutiques, restaurants, cafés, spa facilities and one of the biggest airport duty-free shops in Canada. At the far end of the jetty, there is a wide open space with a lot of natural lights through floor to ceilings windows and a big skylight in the rooftop. The masterpiece of the jetty is a work of art, called Veil of Glass, composed of different coloured glass triangles illuminated by spotlights, created by local artist ATOMIC3. Several murals and other works of art are also located in this jetty, including four from various Montréal museums.

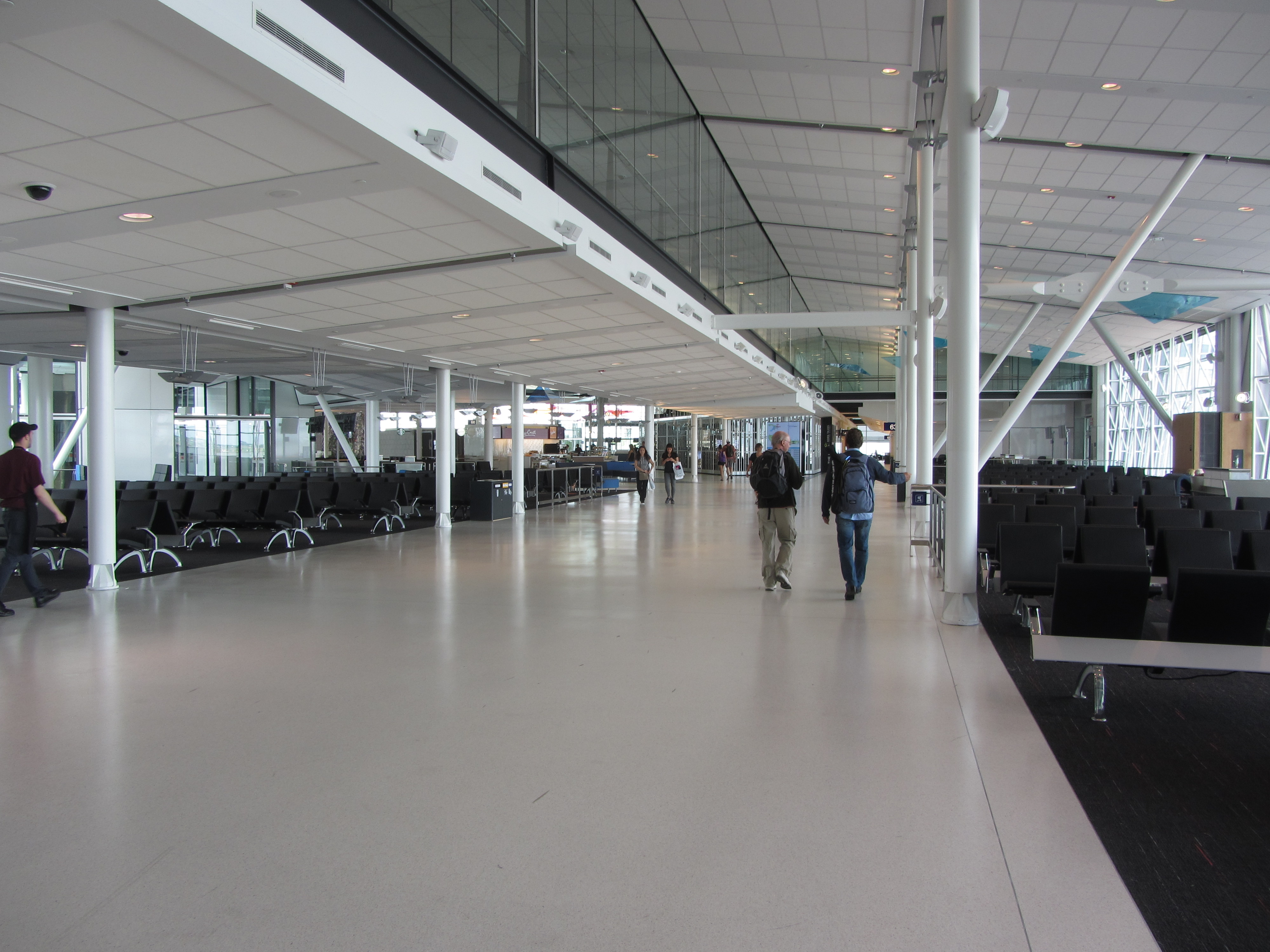
The international jetty near gate 63

In the international jetty, there is a large area where passengers can relax before their flight. Travellers are able to download to their smartphone or e-reader the first chapter of any books available on the platform Lire vous transporte. After that, they can choose to buy the entire book through the Wi-Fi network in the airport. A rest area has been constructed near gate 57 in order to read these books in a calm environment, with cushions and dimmed lights. There are over 1000 chairs with charging stations and USB ports throughout the jetty as well as three water bottle-filling stations.

==== Transborder jetty ====
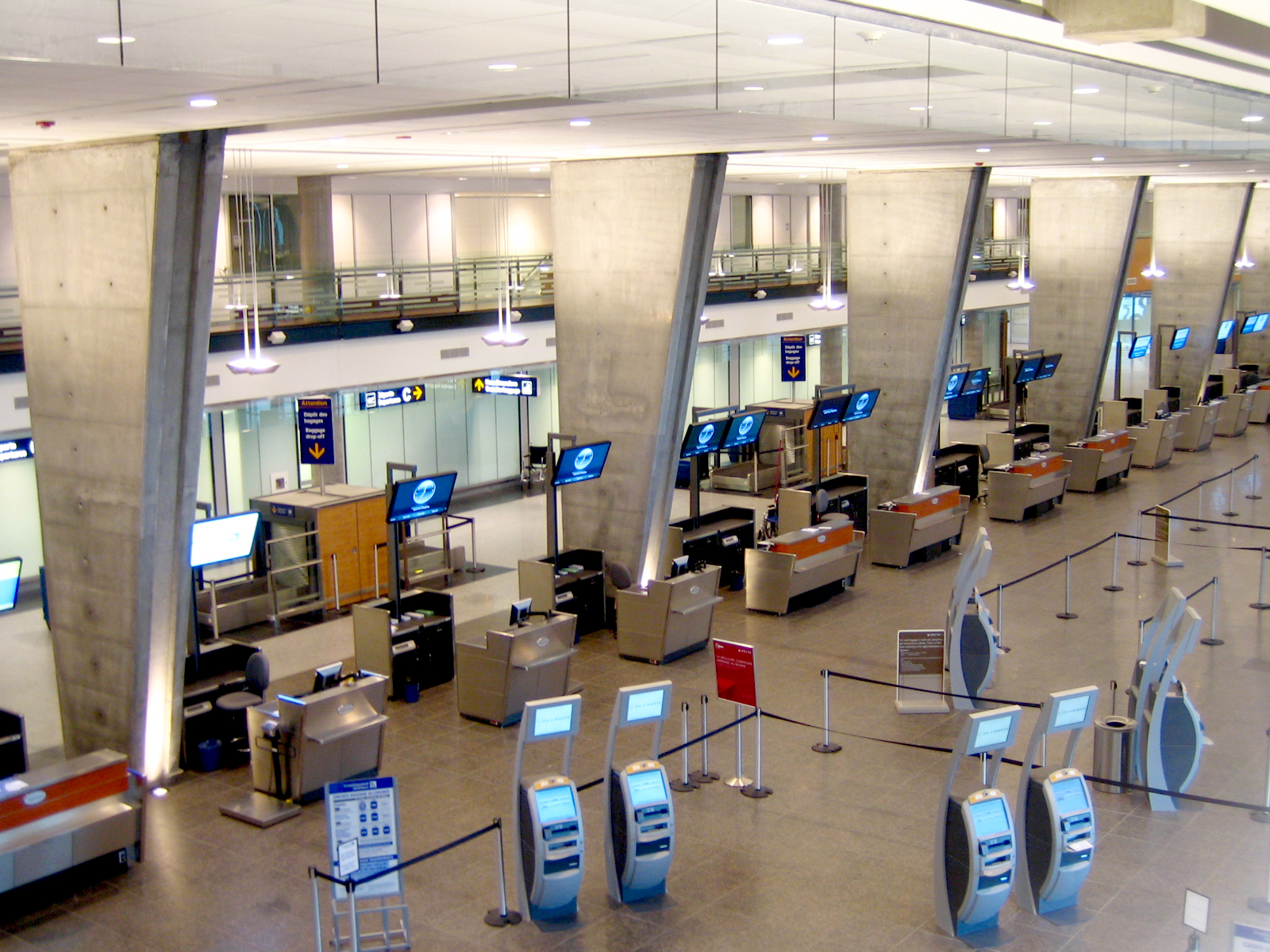
The interior of the U.S. Departures wing

The transborder jetty is dedicated to all U.S. bound flights, and has 18 gates: 72 through 89. For access to gate 87, 88 or 89, passengers must go down one level via an escalator. Gate 56, 58 and 60 (part of the international jetty) can also be used for U.S. bound flights. They can be isolated from the other gates by moving glass walls known as swing gates. Unlike other jetties, the transborder jetty requires passengers to go through security checkpoint C and then the U.S. Customs and Border Protection and lastly through the duty-free shop before accessing their gates. The gate area contains the same services as the other parts of the airport such as shops, restaurants, rest zones and cafés. If needed, some gates can be isolated in order to offer additional security checkpoints if an aircraft flies to a potential risk zone like Washington–National.

=== Airport lounges ===
Two major airline alliances (SkyTeam and Star Alliance) are present at Montréal-Trudeau, and therefore both maintain frequent flyer lounges within the airport. There are also four "Pay-In" lounges open for use by all passengers, regardless of airline, frequent flyer status or class of travel.

- Air Canada Maple Leaf Lounge (Star Alliance)
  - Domestic – Gate 5
  - International – Gate 52
  - USA Transborder – Gate 73
- Air Canada Café (Star Alliance)
  - Domestic – Gate 5
  - USA Transborder – Gate 73
- Air France KLM Lounge (SkyTeam)
  - International – Gate 57
- Aspire American Express Lounge
  - Domestic – Gate 1
- Desjardins Odyssey Lounge
  - International – Gate 63
- Desjardins Odyssey Lounge – Plaza Premium Lounge
  - USA Transborder – Gate 76
- National Bank Lounge
  - International – Gate 53

== Airlines and destinations ==
=== Passenger ===
Airlines	Destinations	Ref.
Aeroméxico	Mexico City–Benito Juárez	
Air Algérie	Algiers	
Air Canada	Austin, Barbados, Barcelona, Bogotá, Boston, Brussels, Calgary, Cancún, Casablanca, Chicago–O'Hare, Denver, Edmonton, Fort-de-France, Fort Lauderdale, Frankfurt, Geneva, Guatemala City, Halifax, Houston–Intercontinental, Kelowna, Las Vegas, Lima, Lisbon, London–Heathrow, Los Angeles, Lyon, Madrid, Mexico City–Benito Juárez, Milan–Malpensa, Nassau, Ottawa, Paris–Charles de Gaulle, Pointe-à-Pitre, Providenciales, Punta Cana, Québec City, Rome–Fiumicino, Samaná, San Francisco, San José (CR), São Paulo–Guarulhos, St. John's (NL), Tenerife–South, Tokyo–Narita, Toronto–Pearson, Toulouse, Vancouver, Winnipeg; Seasonal: Amsterdam, Aruba (begins December 6, 2026), Athens, Atlanta, Basel/Mulhouse (begins June 16, 2027), Belize City, Berlin, Cartagena, Catania, Copenhagen, Cozumel, Curaçao, Dallas/Fort Worth, Delhi–Indira Gandhi, Dublin, Dubrovnik (begins May 11, 2027), Edinburgh, Fort Myers, Ixtapa/Zihuatanejo, La Romana, Liberia (CR), Minneapolis/St. Paul, Montego Bay, Monterrey (starts May 1, 2027), Nantes, Naples, New York–LaGuardia, Nice, Palma de Mallorca, Philadelphia, Phoenix–Sky Harbor, Porto, Puerto Plata, Puerto Vallarta, Quito (begins December 4, 2026), Roatán (begins December 12, 2026), Reykjavík–Keflavík, San Diego, San José del Cabo, Santiago de Chile, Santo Domingo–Las Américas (begins December 10, 2026), Seville (begins September 8, 2027), Seoul–Incheon, St. Louis, St. Maarten, Tel Aviv (suspended until May 2, 2027), Tulum, Venice, Victoria, West Palm Beach	
Air Canada Express	Atlanta, Bagotville, Boston, Charlottetown, Chicago–O'Hare, Deer Lake, Fredericton, Moncton, Nashville, New York–LaGuardia, Newark, Philadelphia, Québec City, Raleigh/Durham Rouyn-Noranda, Saint John (NB), Sept-Îles, Sydney (NS), Toronto–Billy Bishop, Washington–Dulles, Washington–National; Seasonal: Cincinnati, Cleveland, Columbus–Glenn, Dallas/Fort Worth, Detroit, Gander, Îles-de-la-Madeleine, Indianapolis (begins June 1, 2027), Minneapolis/St. Paul, Pittsburgh, Regina, Saskatoon, St. Louis	
Air Canada Rouge	Cancún, Fort Lauderdale, Miami, Orlando, Phoenix–Sky Harbor, Punta Cana, Québec City, San Salvador (Bahamas), Tampa; Seasonal: Charlottetown, Halifax, Las Vegas, Moncton, Samaná, San Juan	
Air China	Beijing–Capital (resumes March 29, 2027)	
Air Creebec	Chibougamau, Chisasibi, Eastmain, Kuujjuarapik, Nemaska, Val-d'Or, Waskaganish, Wemindji	
Air France	Paris–Charles de Gaulle	
Air Inuit	Akulivik, Inukjuak, Ivujivik, Kuujjuaq, Kuujjuarapik, La Grande, Puvirnituq, Québec City, Salluit, Schefferville, Sept-Îles, Umiujaq	
Air Saint-Pierre	Saint-Pierre	
Air Transat	Barcelona, Bordeaux, Cancún, Cartagena, Dakar–Diass, Fort-de-France, Istanbul, Liberia (CR), Lima, Lisbon, Lyon, Madrid, Málaga, Marrakesh, Marseille, Medellín–JMC, Montego Bay, Nantes, Paris–Charles de Gaulle, Pointe-à-Pitre, Puerto Plata, Punta Cana, St. Maarten, Samaná, San José (CR), Toronto–Pearson, Valencia; Seasonal: Acapulco, Agadir, Aruba (begins December 12, 2026), Barbados (begins December 13, 2026), Basel/Mulhouse, Brussels, Cozumel, Faro (begins June 14, 2027), Geneva (begins June 19, 2027), Gran Canaria (begins December 12, 2026), La Romana, London–Gatwick, Nice, Ottawa, Porto, Puerto Vallarta, Québec City, Reykjavík–Keflavík, Rio de Janeiro–Galeão, Río Hato, Rome–Fiumicino, San José del Cabo (begins December 10, 2026) San Juan, San Salvador, Toulouse, Tulum	
American Airlines	Dallas/Fort Worth, Miami	
American Eagle	Charlotte, Chicago–O'Hare, New York–LaGuardia, Philadelphia	
Arajet	Punta Cana	
Austrian Airlines	Vienna	
Avianca	Bogotá	
Avianca El Salvador	Seasonal: San Salvador	
Azores Airlines	Ponta Delgada	
BermudAir	Bermuda	
British Airways	London–Heathrow	
Central Mountain Air	Blanc-Sablon, Chevery, La Romaine, Natashquan, Québec City, Saint-Augustin, Sept-Îles	
Copa Airlines	Panama City–Tocumen	
Delta Air Lines	Atlanta	
Delta Connection	Detroit, Minneapolis/St. Paul, New York–LaGuardia	
Emirates	Dubai–International	
Flair Airlines	Seasonal: Cancún (resumes December 17, 2026), Puerto Plata (starts December 18, 2026), Puerto Vallarta (starts December 16, 2026), Punta Cana (resumes December 17, 2026), Vancouver	
French Bee	Paris–Orly	
KLM	Amsterdam	
Lufthansa	Munich; Seasonal: Frankfurt	
PAL Airlines	Gaspé, Îles-de-la-Madeleine, Québec City, Sept-Îles, Val-d'Or, Wabush	
Porter Airlines	Boston, Calgary, Edmonton, Halifax, Newark, Toronto–Billy Bishop, Toronto–Pearson, Vancouver; Seasonal: Fort Lauderdale, Fort Myers, Nassau	
Propair	Bathurst, Québec City, Ottawa, Sudbury	
Qatar Airways	Doha	
Royal Air Maroc	Casablanca	
Royal Jordanian	Amman–Queen Alia	
Swiss International Air Lines	Zürich	
TAP Air Portugal	Lisbon	
Tunisair	Tunis	
Turkish Airlines	Istanbul	
United Airlines	Seasonal: Chicago–O'Hare, San Francisco	
United Express	Chicago–O'Hare, Newark, Washington–Dulles	
WestJet	Calgary, Cancún, Cozumel, Edmonton (resumes March 24, 2027), Freeport, Liberia (CR), Mazatlán, Montego Bay, Puerto Plata, Punta Cana, Río Hato, Samaná, St. Maarten, Toronto–Pearson, Winnipeg (resumes March 24, 2027); Seasonal: Managua, Roatán, San Andrés Island, Tulum	

=== Cargo ===
Airlines	Destinations
Air Canada Cargo	Atlanta, Chicago–O'Hare, Mexico City–Felipe Ángeles

== Statistics ==
=== Annual traffic ===
Annual passenger traffic at Montréal–Trudeau International Airport 2006 through 2025
Year	Passenger volume	% change	Domestic	% change	International^{A}	% change	Transborder^{A}	% change
2025	22,364,685	▼0.5%	6,795,650	▲1.9%	10,869,902	▲2.4%	4,699,133	▼9.5%
2024	22,406,972	▲5.8%	6,603,647	▲0.2%	10,595,413	▲7.6%	5,201,039	▲9.9%
2023	21,173,941	▲32.5%	6,593,705	▲21.8%	9,847,904	▲38.7%	4,732,332	▲36.5%
2022	15,980,670	▲207.1%	5,412,293	▲122.0%	7,100,615	▲272.2%	3,467,762	▲305.1%
2021^{B}	5,201,751	▼4.3%	2,442,801	▲21.6%	1,903,257	▼20.2%	855,693	▼17.8%
2020^{B}	5,437,210	▼73.2%	2,009,014	▼72.1%	2,386,734	▼72.2%	1,041,462	▼76.9%
2019	20,305,106	▲4.5%	7,192,116	▲0.6%	8,595,100	▲9.3%	4,517,890	▲2.3%
2018	19,428,143	▲7.0%	7,145,771	▲3.3%	7,866,203	▲10.2%	4,416,169	▲7.5%
2017	18,160,223	▲9.5%	6,916,725	▲7.5%	7,135,975	▲13.5%	4,107,523	▲6.2%
2016	16,589,067	▲6.9%	6,431,691	▲9.5%	6,288,860	▲6.0%	3,868,516	▲4.3%
2015	15,517,382	▲4.6%	5,874,944	▲3.0%	5,933,290	▲6.7%	3,709,148	▲3.8%
2014	14,840,067	▲5.3%	5,705,140	▲5.5%	5,561,286	▲4.9%	3,573,641	▲5.6%
2013	14,095,272	▲2.1%	5,408,528	▲1.4%	5,302,692	▲1.1%	3,384,052	▲4.7%
2012	13,809,820	▲1.0%	5,333,749	▲2.1%	5,244,656	▲0.1%	3,231,415	▲0.9%
2011	13,668,829	▲5.4%	5,225,786	▲5.4%	5,239,928	▲7.7%	3,203,115	▲1.7%
2010	12,971,339	▲6.1%	4,957,003	▲3.6%	4,864,921	▲6.4%	3,149,415	▲10.0%
2009	12,224,534	▼4.6%	4,793,177	▼9.2%	4,567,686	▲2.3%	2,863,671	▼6.7%
2008	12,813,320	0.0%	5,278,945	▼2.1%	4,465,589	▲5.2%	3,068,786	▼3.5%
2007	12,817,969	▲12.0%	5,393,576	▲15.9%	4,245,642	▲14.5%	3,178,751	▲3.2%
2006	11,441,202	▲5.0%	4,653,599	▲4.6%	3,708,264	▲7.1%	3,079,339	▲3.2%

^A: At Montréal–Trudeau and at other airports in Canada with United States border preclearance, a distinction is made between "transborder" and "international" flights for operational and statistical purposes. A "transborder" flight is a flight between Canada and a destination in the United States, while an "international" flight is a flight between Canada and a destination that is not within the United States or Canada. A "domestic" flight is a flight within Canada only.

^B: During 2020 & 2021, there was a significant decrease of passenger numbers due to the COVID-19 global pandemic and Canada border closures and/or restrictions.

== Ground transportation ==
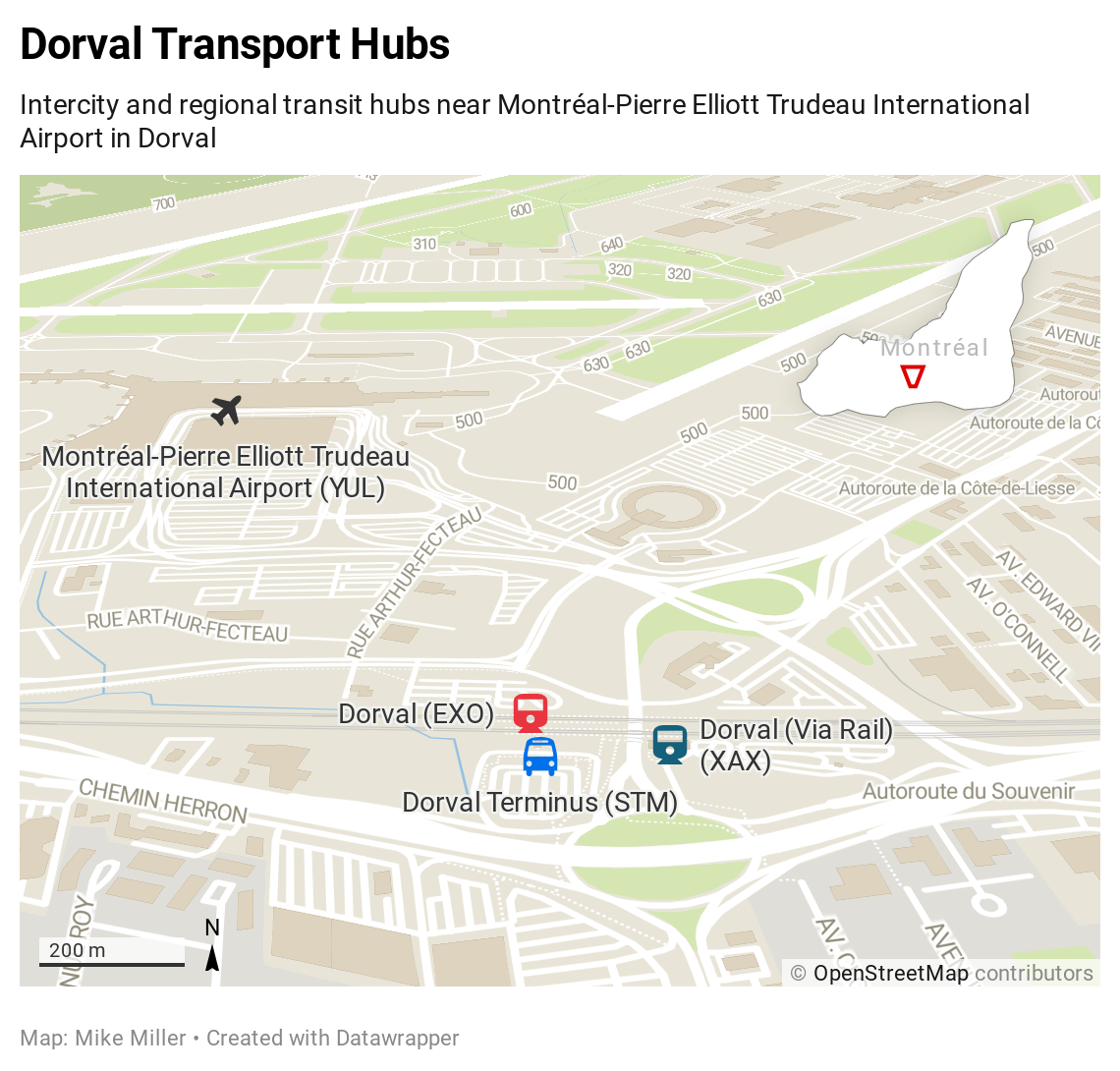
Intercity and regional transit hubs near Montréal-Pierre Elliott Trudeau International Airport in Dorval

=== Public transit ===
Montréal–Trudeau is accessible by six bus routes operated by the Société de transport de Montréal (STM): one dedicated airport transfer service, one express route, two regular daytime routes, and two night buses.

Introduced on March 29, 2010, the 747 Montreal-Trudeau/Downtown route operates for 24 hours every day of the year, connecting the airport to Lionel-Groulx metro station, Central Station, Berri–UQAM metro station, and the city centre. Prior to the introduction of the 747 bus service, Groupe La Québécoise operated a coach service known as L'Aerobus between the airport and Central Station, connecting with several hotels downtown.

In addition to the 747, Montréal–Trudeau is accessible by the 209 Des Sources and 214 Stuart-Graham everyday, while the 356 Lachine/YUL Aéroport/Des Sources and 378 Sauvé/YUL Aéroport serve the airport during night service hours. It is also accessible by the 460 Express Métropolitaine, which runs during rush hours. These routes provide service to the Dorval bus terminus and train station, which is within walking distance of Via's Dorval station.

Société de transport de Montréal
No.	Route	Destination
209	Des Sources / YUL Aéroport	Northbound to Pierrefonds-Roxboro station via Terminus Dorval Station; Connects to:
214	Stuart-Graham / YUL Aéroport	Westbound to Terminus Dorval Station; Connects to:
356 ☾	Lachine / YUL Aéroport / Des Sources	Westbound to Sunnybrooke station via Terminus Dorval Station; Eastbound to Downtown Montreal via Atwater, Frontenac, and Terminus Dorval Station; Connects to:
378 ☾	Sauvé / YUL Aéroport	Eastbound to Saint-Laurent via Côte-Vertu, Montpellier, Sauvé and Terminus Dorval Station; Connects to:
460	Express Métropolitaine	Eastbound to Galeries d'Anjou shopping centre via De la Savane and Crémazie via Terminus Dorval Station; Connects to:
747 ✈	YUL Aéroport / Centre-ville	Eastbound to Lionel-Groulx station, Lucien-L'Allier station, Bonaventure station, Montreal Central Station, Berri–UQAM station, and Gare d'autocars in downtown Montreal; Connects to:
815	REM Des Sources / YUL	Westbound to Des Sources; Connects to:

=== Intercity rail connections ===
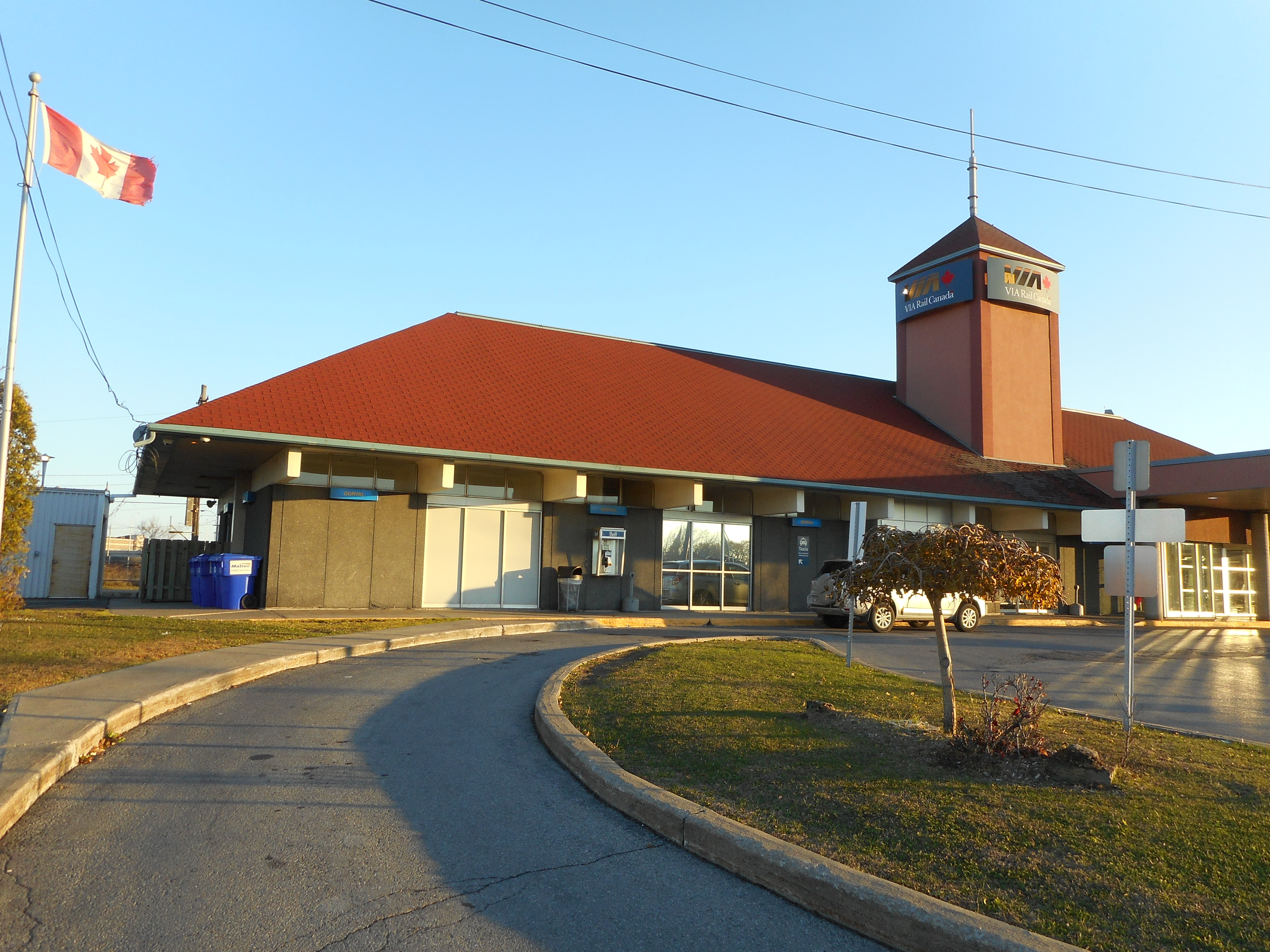
Dorval station (Via Rail)

Connection to Via Rail, the national train operator in Canada, is possible through an airport shuttle bus to Dorval station (IATA: XAX) located 2 kilometres (1.2 mi) to the south of the airport. It is the nearest station on the Québec City-Windsor Corridor and offers inter-city rail connections to Quebec City, Ottawa, Kingston and Toronto as well as smaller regional centres in Quebec and Ontario. Via does not provide local service between Dorval and Montreal Central Station.

The shuttle bus from Montréal–Trudeau International Airport to Dorval station is free of charge to Via Rail passengers. Operated by indigo, the service departs from departures door 8 every 45–60 minutes during the stations opening hours, taking around 5 minutes to reach its destination.

=== Intercity bus ===
KLM Royal Dutch Airlines operates a bus from Trudeau Airport to Ottawa Railway Station only for Air France-KLM customers originating in/arriving in the Ottawa area. As of 2016 Air-France KLM has three daily bus services between those cities.

Air France also operates a bus from Trudeau to Sainte-Foy in Quebec City for its customers.

Swiss International Air Lines previously operated its Swissbus service from Trudeau to Ottawa Railway Station for Swiss customers.

Orléans Express offers service from Ottawa, Gatineau, Drummondville, and Quebec City.

=== Car ===
The airport is accessible from Highway 20 or from Highway 520, a spur off Highway 40 that leads directly towards the airport. Eastbound Highway 20 leads to the Dorval interchange, the exit which drivers must take for the airport. From the north, Côte-Vertu Boulevard that runs parallel to runways 24L and 24R provides access to the Air Canada Base and hangars, Air Transat hangars, Air Inuit hangars, Bombardier Aerospace assembly facility and the deicing facility.

When drivers pick up or drop off guests at Trudeau, they are permitted to stop momentarily outside the Arrivals and Departure areas at both the Canada and International departures as well as the Transborder Jetty.

Aéroports de Montréal, the City of Montreal, Transports Québec and Transport Canada made plans to improve the Dorval interchange and built direct road links between the airport and highways 20 and 520. Once the certificate of authorization was obtained, work began in June 2009 with an original projected end date of 2017, although some parts of the project will be on hold for several years. The project entails redesigning the road network within the airport site, which was mostly completed as planned.

=== Future connections ===
On April 22, 2016, the CEO of the Caisse de Dépot et de Placement du Québec Michael Sabia and Montreal mayor Denis Coderre announced a massive transit project called Réseau express métropolitain, slated to open between 2023 and 2027. This planned rapid transit network will connect the Trudeau Airport to Montreal Central Station in Downtown Montréal, the North Shore, the South Shore and the West Island. It will run from 5.30am to 1am, 7 days a week. Construction began in April 2018 and will connect Trudeau Airport with downtown by the end of 2027.

== Incidents and accidents ==
- November 29, 1963 – Trans-Canada Air Lines Flight 831 crashed shortly after departure for Toronto International Airport, killing all 118 people on board the Douglas DC-8 jet.
- On June 18, 1998, Propair Flight 420 suffered from brake dragging on departure from Trudeau Airport (then known as Montreal Dorval Airport). This heated up the wheel brakes of the Fairchild Metroliner, which eventually became lit by hydraulic fluid, starting a fire in the left wing. The aircraft attempted to divert to Mirabel International Airport. However, the left wing suffered a structural failure due to the extreme flames, and the aircraft rolled and hit the ground upside down, killing all 11 people on the flight.
- On August 24, 2026, a ground worker was killed after they were struck on the tarmac by a French Bee Airbus A350 preparing for a flight to Paris. Passengers on board witnessed the incident via cameras on the aircraft.

== Tenants ==
Jet Fuel A, A-1 and 100LL are available from various FBOs at Dorval.
