= Val-d'Or Airport =

Airport in Val-d'Or, Quebec, Canada

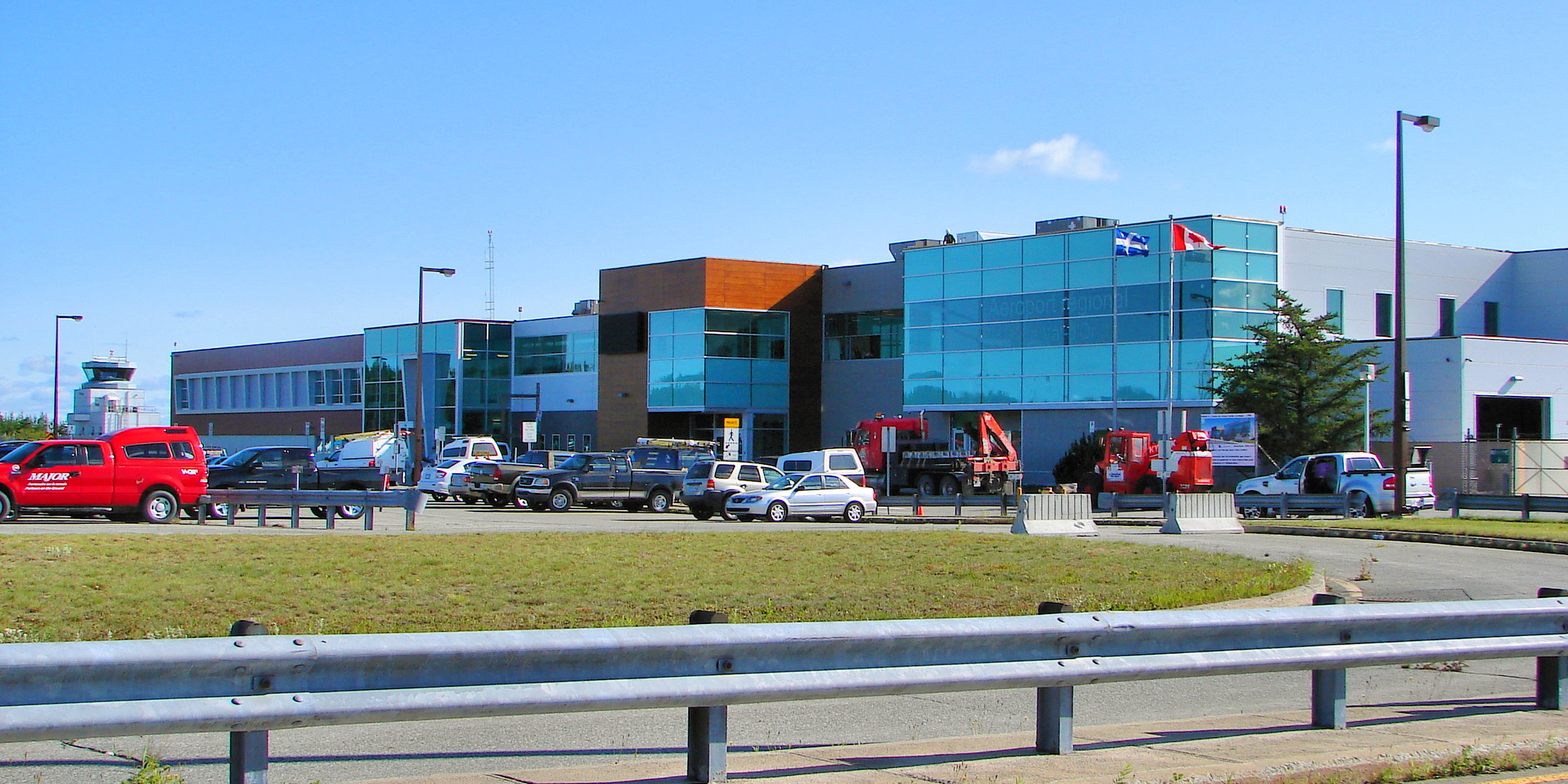
- IATA: YVO; ICAO: CYVO; WMO: 71725

Summary
- Airport type: Public
- Operator: Aéroport régional de Val-d'Or
- Location: Val-d'Or, Quebec
- Time zone: EST (UTC−05:00)
  - Summer (DST): EDT (UTC−04:00)
- Elevation AMSL: 1,105 ft / 337 m
- Coordinates: 48°03′12″N 077°46′58″W
- Website: www.arvo.qc.ca

Map

Runways
Direction	Length		Surface
Direction	ft	m	Surface
18/36	10,000	3,048	Asphalt

Statistics (2012)
- Aircraft movements: 20,550
- Sources: Canada Flight Supplement; Environment Canada; Movements from Statistics Canada

Val-d'Or Airport (IATA: YVO, ICAO: CYVO) is located 2.5 nautical miles (4.6 km; 2.9 mi) south of Val-d'Or, Quebec, Canada.

== Airlines and destinations ==
Airlines	Destinations
Air Creebec	Chisasibi, Eastmain, Kuujjuarapik, Montreal–Trudeau, Waskaganish, Wemindji
Air Inuit	Charter: Kattiniq/Donaldson
Nolinor Aviation	Charter: Meadowbank Gold Mine, Rankin Inlet

== Accidents and incidents ==
- On 19 June 1970, Douglas C-47A CF-AAC of Austin Airways was written off in an accident.
- On 13 March 1994, during a flight between Val-d'Or and Montreal Dorval a Canadian Airlines (Inter-Canadien) ATR 42-300 registered as C-GIQV suffered a propeller blade failure at 17,000 ft (5,182 m). The aircraft landed safely at Montreal.
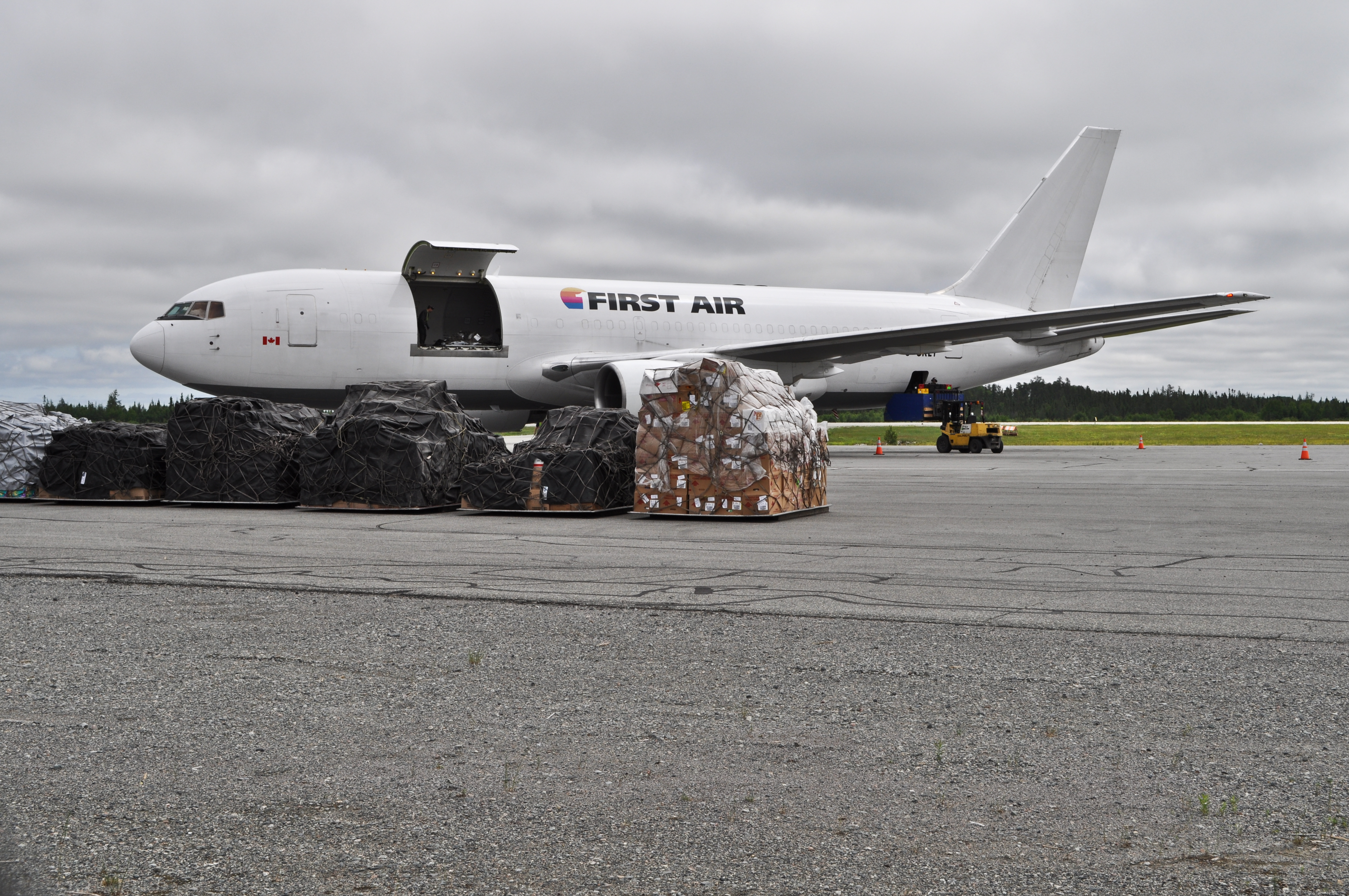
First Air Boeing 767 at Val-d'Or Airport

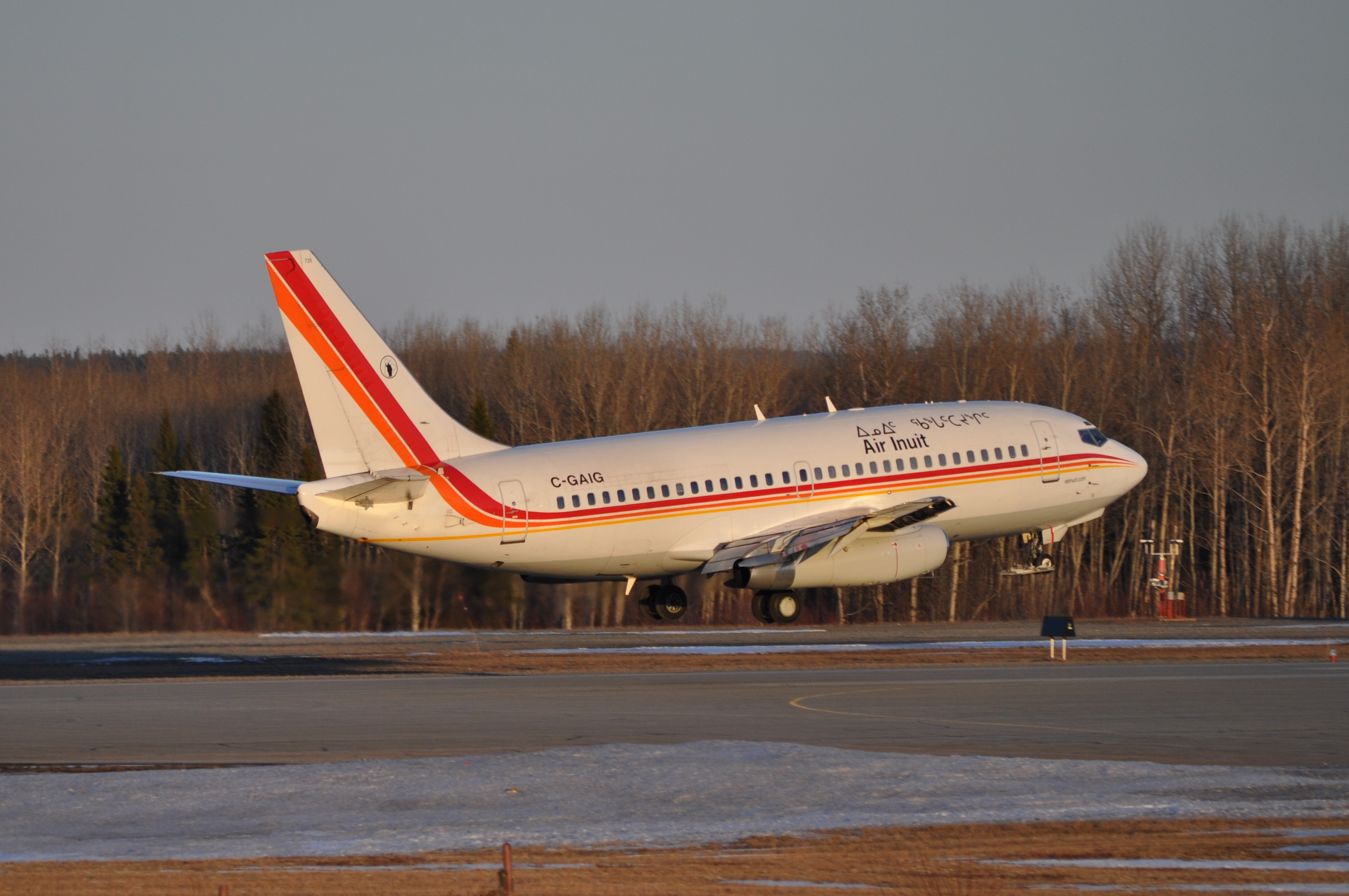
Air Inuit Boeing 737-200

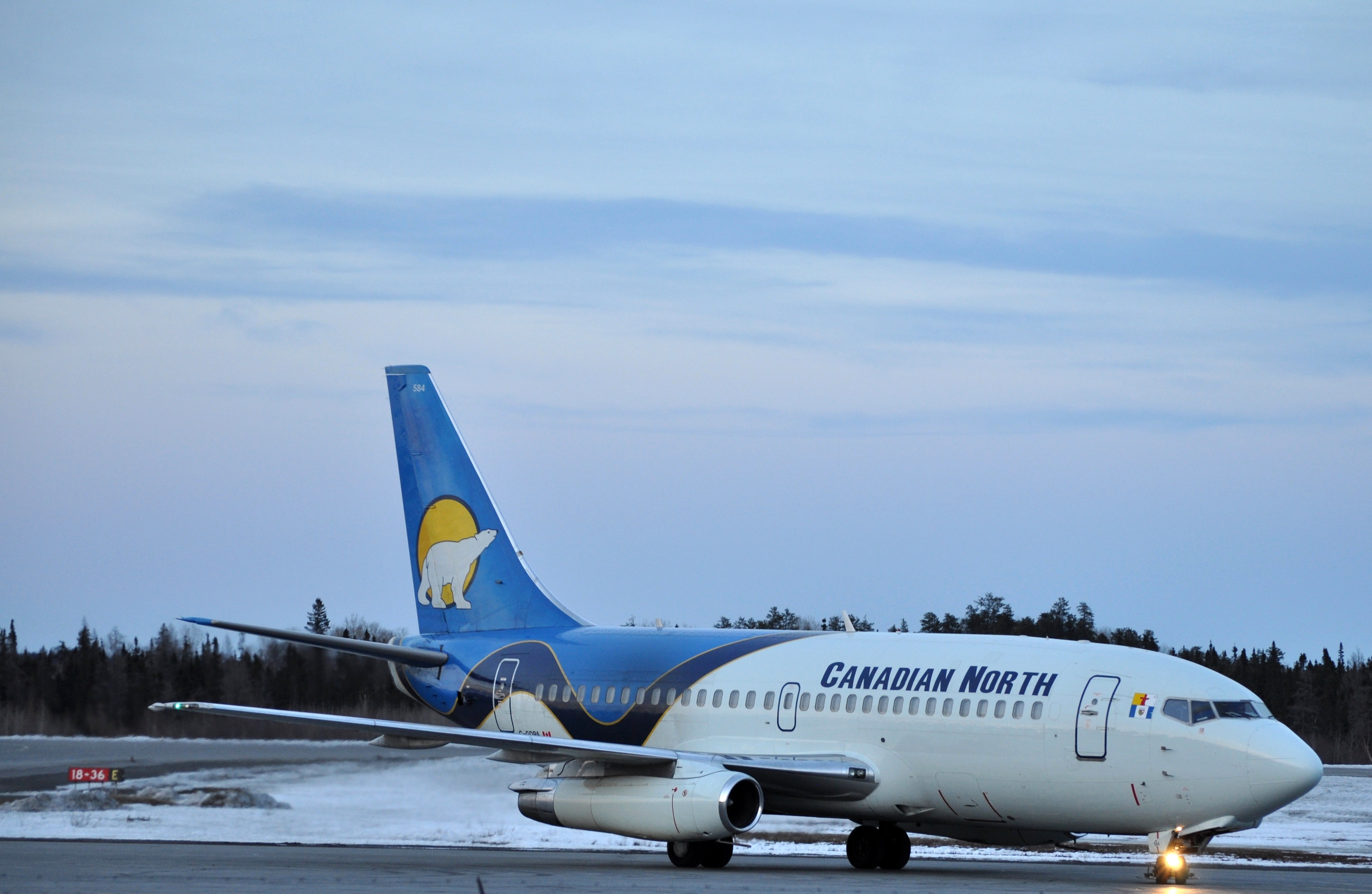
Canadian North Boeing 737-200 in Val-d'Or
