= Waskaganish Airport =

Airport in Waskaganish, Quebec, Canada

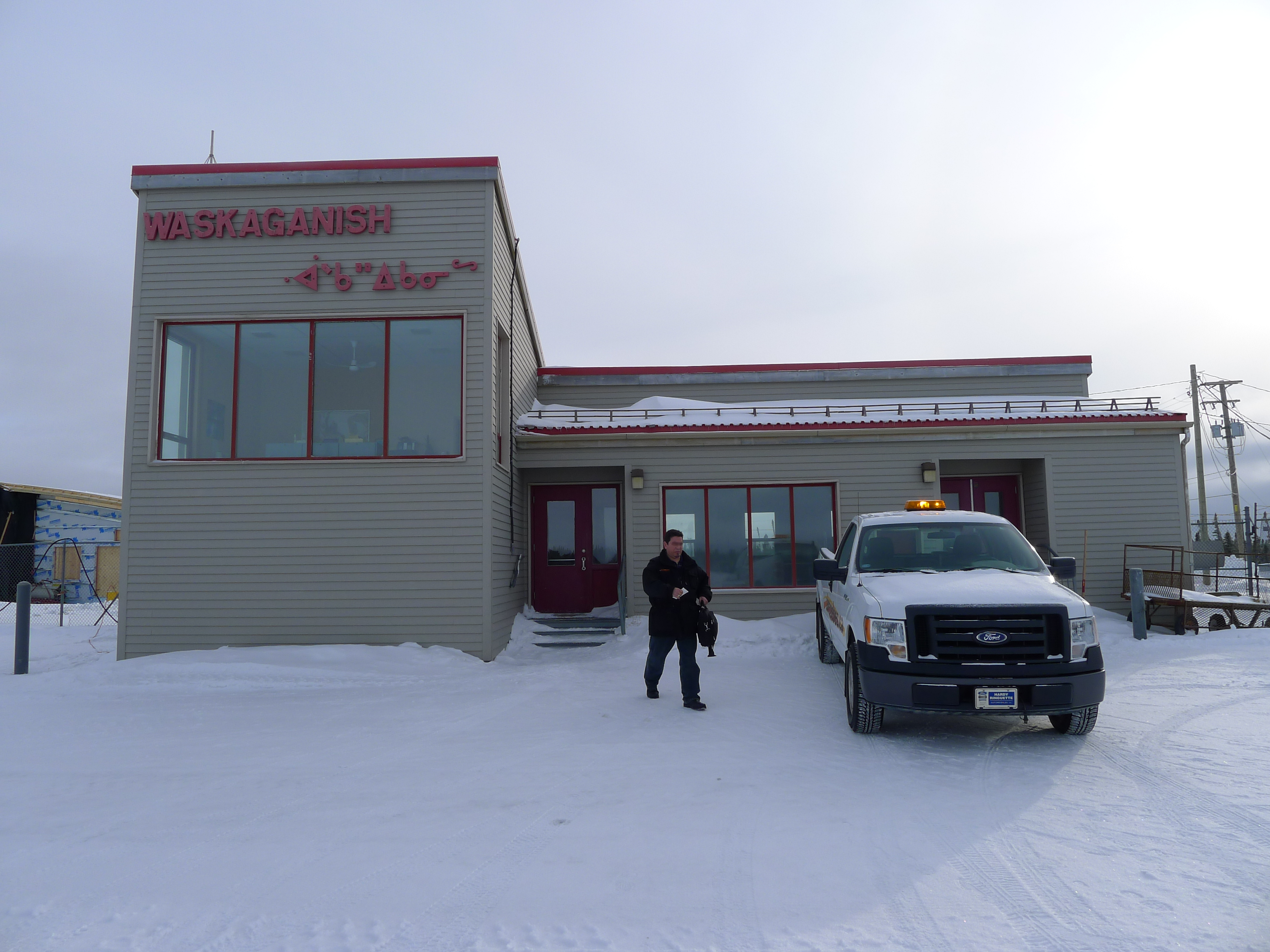
- The old airport's main building in front of the airstrip, January 2011

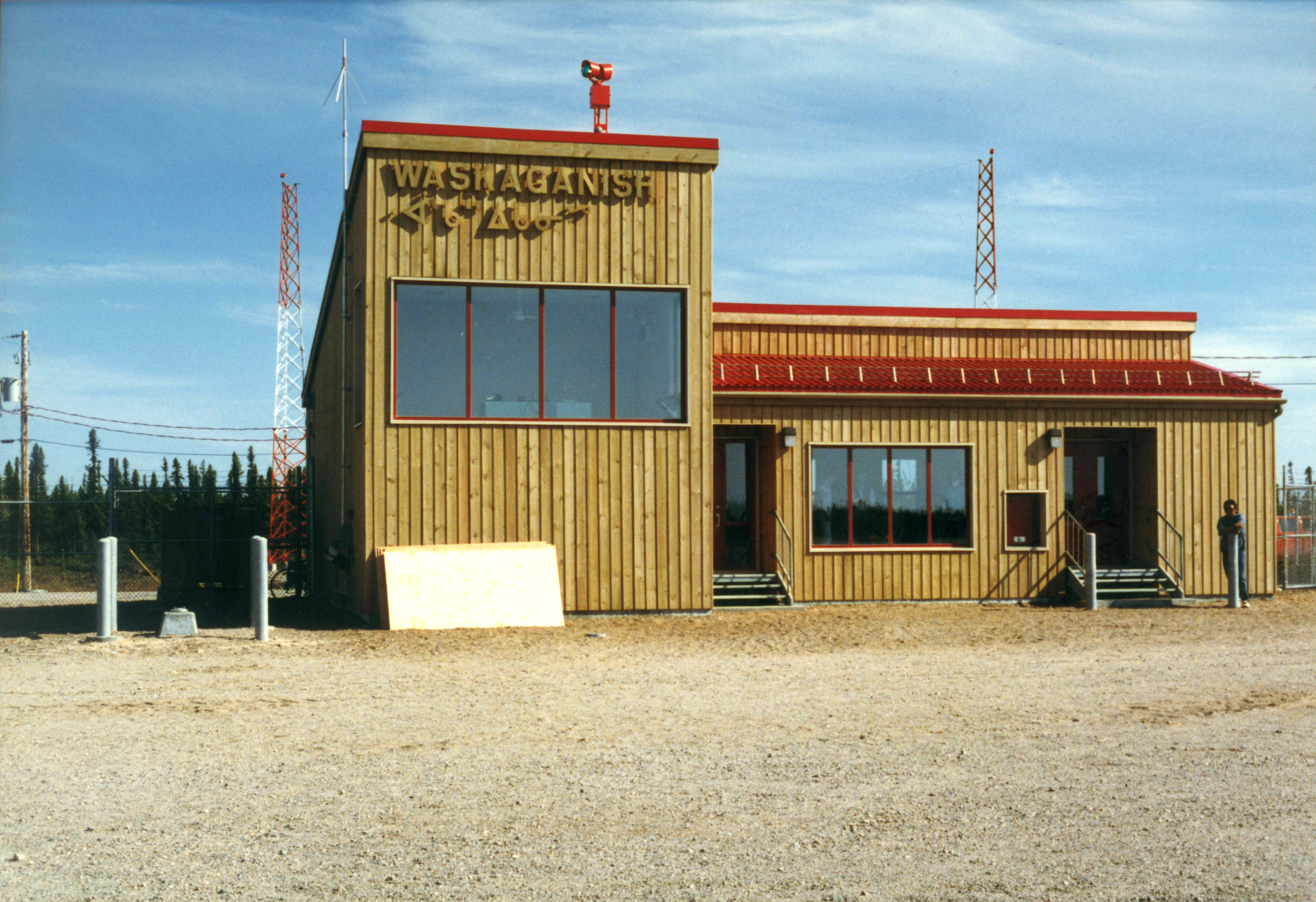
- The same building, July 1987
- IATA: YKQ; ICAO: CYKQ

Summary
- Airport type: Public
- Operator: Transport Canada
- Location: Waskaganish, Quebec
- Time zone: EST (UTC−05:00)
  - Summer (DST): EDT (UTC−04:00)
- Elevation AMSL: 79 ft (24 m)
- Coordinates: 51°28′24″N 078°45′30″W

Map
- Location in Quebec

Runways
Direction	Length		Surface
Direction	ft	m	Surface
06/24	3,511	1,070	Gravel

Statistics (2010)
- Aircraft movements: 3,362
- Source: Canada Flight Supplement; Movements from Statistics Canada

Waskaganish Airport (IATA: YKQ, ICAO: CYKQ) is located near the town of Waskaganish, Quebec, Canada.

== Airlines and destinations ==
Airlines	Destinations
Air Creebec	Chisasibi, Eastmain, Kuujjuarapik, Montreal–Trudeau, Val-d'Or, Wemindji
