= Chibougamau/Chapais Airport =

Airport in Chibougamau, Quebec, Canada

- IATA: YMT; ICAO: CYMT; WMO: 71822

Summary
- Airport type: Public
- Owner/Operator: Transports Québec
- Serves: Chibougamau, Chapais, Ouje-Bougoumou, Mistissini
- Location: Chibougamau, Quebec
- Time zone: EST (UTC−05:00)
  - Summer (DST): EDT (UTC−04:00)
- Elevation AMSL: 1,270 ft (390 m)
- Coordinates: 49°46′19″N 074°31′41″W

Map
- Location in Quebec

Runways
Direction	Length		Surface
Direction	ft	m	Surface
04/22	6,495	1,980	Asphalt

Statistics (2010)
- Aircraft movements: 6,974
- Source: Canada Flight Supplement; Movements from Statistics Canada.

Chibougamau/Chapais Airport (IATA: YMT, ICAO: CYMT) is located 10.7 nautical miles (19.8 km; 12.3 mi) southwest of Chibougamau, Quebec, Canada, or about halfway to Chapais along Route 113.

== Airlines and destinations ==
Airlines	Destinations
Air Creebec	Montreal–Trudeau, Nemaska

== Incidents ==
On October 25, 2007 at approximately 0900 local time, a Beech King Air 100A operating as "Cree" 501 crashed on approach into Chibougamau (CYMT). Both pilots were fatally injured. No passengers were on board. It was speculated that the cause of the accident was the visibility at the airport, which was 1.5SM with a ceiling of 500 feet.
