= Air Creebec =

Canadian regional airline

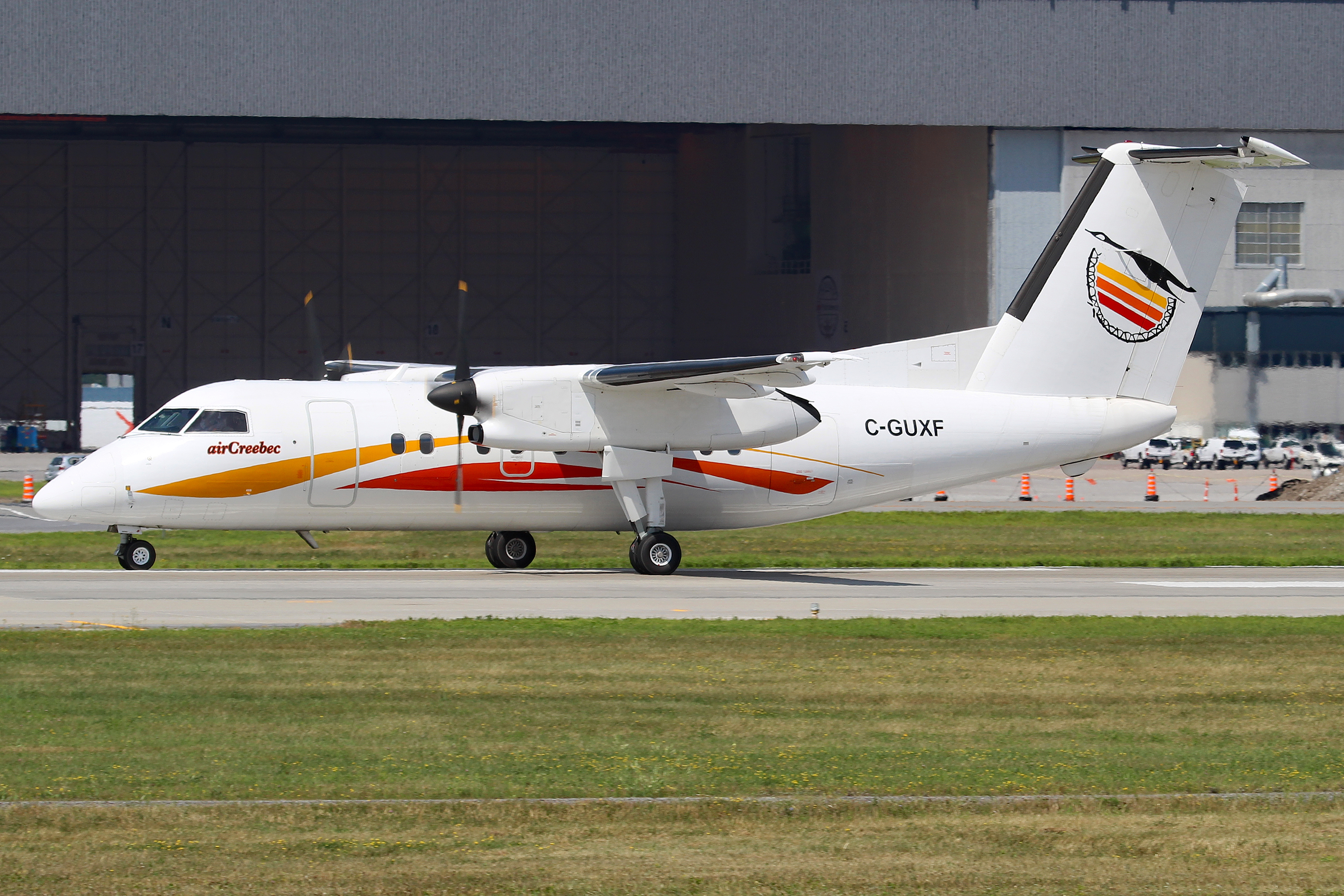
- Air Creebec De Havilland Canada Dash 8
IATA	ICAO	Call sign
YN	CRQ	CREE
- Founded: 1982
- AOC #: 8982
- Hubs: Val-d'Or Airport; Montréal–Trudeau International Airport; Waskaganish Airport
- Secondary hubs: Timmins Victor M. Power Airport
- Frequent-flyer program: Aeroplan
- Fleet size: 22
- Destinations: 16
- Parent company: Cree Regional Economic Enterprises Company (CREECO)
- Headquarters: Val-d'Or, Quebec
- Key people: Tanya Pash (President)
- Founder: Billy Diamond
- Website: www.aircreebec.ca

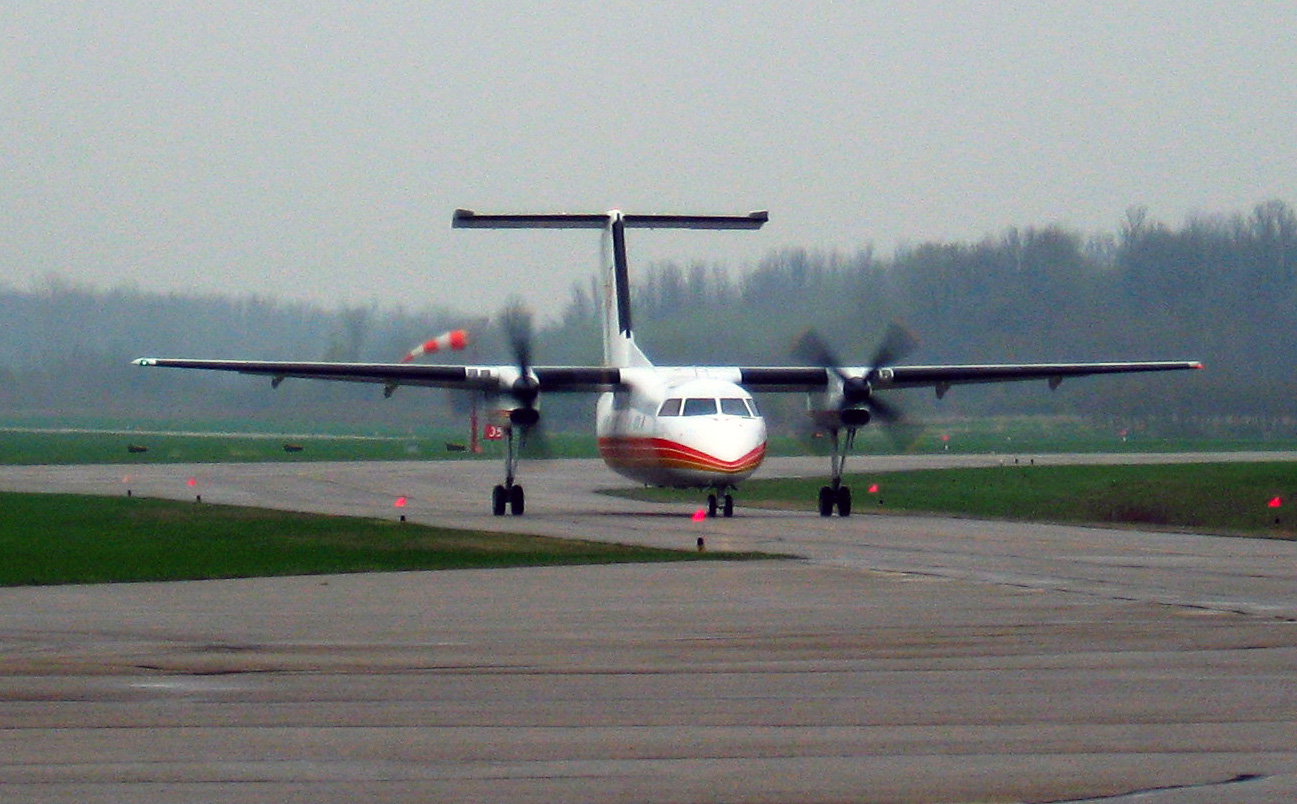
Air Creebec Dash-8-102 C-FCSK

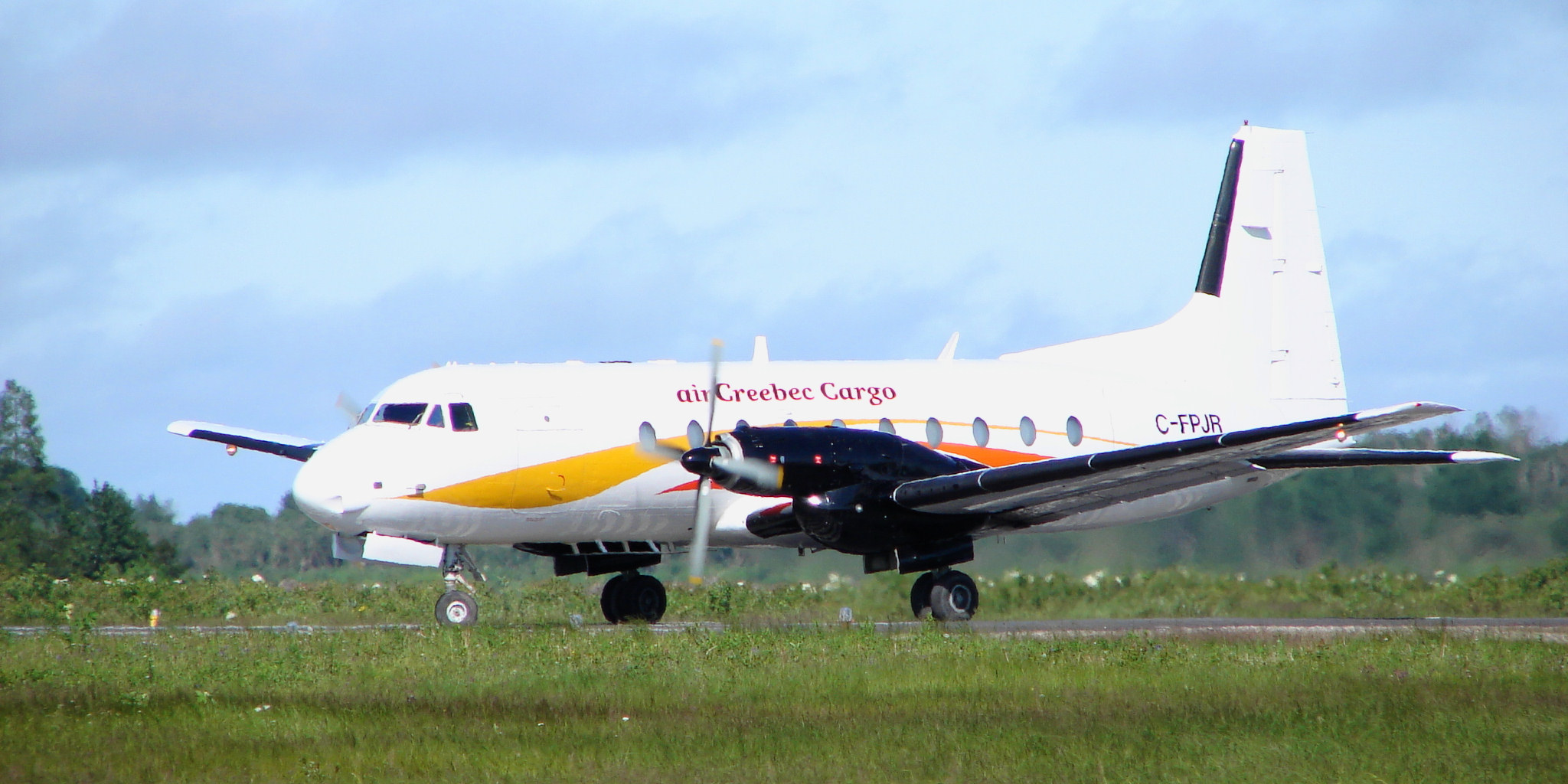
Air Creebec HS 748 C-FPJR

Air Creebec Inc. is a Cree-owned regional airline based in Val-d'Or, Quebec, Canada. It operates scheduled and charter services to 16 destinations in Quebec and Ontario. Its main base is Val-d'Or Airport, with a hub at Timmins Victor M. Power Airport.

As part of its charter operations, the airline operates a medical charter service in conjunction with the Cree Board of Health and Social Services of James Bay to provide access to medical specialists and services in the South to Quebec Cree.

== History ==
Old logo

The airline was established in June 1982 and started operations on 1 July 1982. Billy Diamond, first and former Grand Chief of the Grand Council of the Cree is credited with the founding of the airline.

At that time the Cree owned 51% of the company and Austin Airways owned the remaining 49%. In 1988 the Cree purchased all the airline assets in the largest commercial deal to that date performed by any Indigenous group in Canada, making Air Creebec owned entirely by the Cree.

According to Cree sources, during negotiations to launch the airline, Premier of Quebec René Lévesque muttered "Indians don't run airlines, Billy", to which founder Billy Diamond replied "Well, this Indian is going to."

On 23 March 2012, Air Creebec discontinued its service to La Grande Rivière Airport.

In 2023 the airline appointed its first female CEO Tanya Pash, succeeding outgoing CEO Matthew Happyjack. Prior to her appointment Pash was COO for 10 years.

== Destinations ==
Air Creebec operates services to the following Canadian domestic scheduled destinations (as of August 2019):

Province	Community	IATA	ICAO	Airport
Ontario	Attawapiskat First Nation	YAT	CYAT	Attawapiskat Airport
Ontario	Fort Albany First Nation	YFA	CYFA	Fort Albany Airport
Ontario	Kashechewan First Nation	ZKE	CZKE	Kashechewan Airport
Ontario	Moosonee	YMO	CYMO	Moosonee Airport
Ontario	Peawanuck	YPO	CYPO	Peawanuck Airport
Ontario	Timmins	YTS	CYTS	Timmins Victor M. Power Airport
Quebec	Chibougamau	YMT	CYMT	Chibougamau/Chapais Airport
Quebec	Chisasibi	YKU	CSU2	Chisasibi Airport
Quebec	Eastmain	ZEM	CZEM	Eastmain River Airport
Quebec	Kuujjuarapik	YGW	CYGW	Kuujjuarapik Airport
Quebec	Montreal	YUL	CYUL	Montréal–Trudeau International Airport
Quebec	Nemaska	YNS	CYHH	Nemiscau Airport
Quebec	Val-d'Or	YVO	CYVO	Val-d'Or Airport
Quebec	Waskaganish	YKQ	CYKQ	Waskaganish Airport
Quebec	Wemindji	YNC	CYNC	Wemindji Airport

=== Interline agreements ===
- Air Canada
- Porter Airlines

== Fleet ==
As of 31 August 2026 Transport Canada listed 22 aircraft, Air Creebec listed the types but not numbers:

Air Creebec fleet
Aircraft	No. of aircraft	Variants	Notes
ATR-GIE (ATR 72)	1	ATR 72-212A	Cargo only
de Havilland Canada Dash 8	21	11 - DHC-8-102; 1 - DHC-8-103; 6 - DHC-8-106; 3 - DHC-8-314	Some Series 100 are freighter only, while the others can carry up to 37 passengers and the Series 300 can carry 50 passengers
Total	22		

== Affinity programs ==
The airline offers Aeroplan rewards points, both to collect and to redeem.
