= List of school districts in Quebec =

This is a list of school districts in Quebec, grouped by administrative region and language. Since 2020 each French school service centre covers five school districts.

List of Quebec school service centres
Name	Language of instruction	Districts served	Administrative region	Notes
Centre de services scolaire des Affluents	French	L'Assomption, Les Moulins (except Terrebonne, Western part)	Lanaudière	
Centre de services scolaire des Appalaches	French	Les Appalaches Regional County Municipality, Saint-Ferdinand, Saints-Martyrs-Canadiens, Stratford, Weedon (Northern part)	Centre-du-Québec, Chaudière-Appalaches, Estrie	
Centre de services scolaire de la Baie-James	French	Jamésie (except Kiggaluk)	Nord-du-Québec	
Centre de services scolaire de la Beauce-Etchemin	French	Beauce-Sartigan, La Nouvelle-Beauce Regional County Municipality (except Saint-Lambert-de-Lauzon), Les Etchemins Regional County Municipality, Robert-Cliche Regional County Municipality, Saint-Ludger, Saint-Patrice-de-Beaurivage, Saint-Robert-Bellarmin and Saint-Sylvestre	Chaudière-Appalaches, Estrie	
Centre de services scolaire des Bois-Francs	French	Arthabaska Regional County Municipality (except Saints-Martyrs-Canadiens), Lemieux, L'Érable Regional County Municipality (except Saint-Ferdinand), Val-Alain	Centre-du-Québec	
Centre de services scolaire de la Capitale	French	Quebec City (except Beauport, Charlesbourg, Lac-Saint-Charles, Sainte-Foy–Sillery–Cap-Rouge), La Jacques-Cartier Regional County Municipality (except Lac-Beauport, Lac-Croche, Lac-Delage, Sainte-Brigitte-de-Laval and Stoneham-et-Tewkesbury)	Capitale-Nationale	
Central Québec School Board	English	Bécancour Regional County Municipality, Capitale-Nationale, Chaudière-Appalaches, Mauricie, Nicolet-Yamaska Regional County Municipality, Saguenay–Lac-Saint-Jean, Jamésie (except Kiggaluk)	Centre-du-Québec, Capitale-Nationale, Chaudière-Appalaches, Nord-du-Québec, Saguenay–Lac-Saint-Jean,	
Centre de services scolaire de Charlevoix	French	Charlevoix Regional County Municipality and Charlevoix-Est Regional County Municipality (except Sagard)	Capitale-Nationale	
Centre de services scolaire du Chemin-du-Roy	French	Les Chenaux Regional County Municipality (except Notre-Dame-du-Mont-Carmel), Maskinongé Regional County Municipality (except Charette, Saint-Alexis-des-Monts, Saint-Barnabé, Saint-Boniface, Saint-Élie-de-Caxton, Saint-Mathieu-du-Parc) and Trois-Rivières	Mauricie	
Centre de services scolaire des Chênes	French	Drummond Regional County Municipality	Centre-du-Québec	
Centre de services scolaire des Chic-Chocs	French	La Côte-de-Gaspé Regional County Municipality and La Haute-Gaspésie Regional County Municipality	Gaspésie–Îles-de-la-Madeleine	
Centre de services Scolaire au Cœur-des-Vallées	French	Buckingham, L'Ange-Gardien, Masson-Angers, Notre-Dame-de-la-Salette, Papineau Regional County Municipality (except Lac-des-Plages),	Outaouais	
Centre de services scolaire de la Côte-du-Sud	French	Bellechasse (except Saint-Henri), L'Islet Regional County Municipality (except Sainte-Louise and Saint-Roch-des-Aulnaies), Montmagny Regional County Municipality	Chaudière-Appalaches	
Cree School Board	Special (English, Cree and French)	Chisasibi (Cree reserved land), Chisasibi (Cree village municipality), Eastmain (Cree reserved land), Eastmain (Cree village municipality), Mistissini (Cree reserved land), Mistissini (Cree village municipality), Nemaska (Cree reserved land), Nemaska (Cree village municipality), Oujé-Bougoumou, Waskaganish (Cree reserved land), Waskaganish (Cree village municipality), Waswanipi (Cree reserved land), Waswanipi (Cree village municipality), Wemindji (Cree reserved land), Wemindji (Cree village municipality), Whapmagoostui (Cree reserved land), Whapmagoostui (Cree village municipality)	Nord-du-Québec	
Centre de services scolaire des Découvreurs	French	L'Ancienne-Lorette, Saint-Augustin-de-Desmaures, Sainte-Foy–Sillery–Cap-Rouge	Capitale-Nationale	
Centre de services Scolaire des Draveurs	French	Cantley, Denholm, Gatineau (except Aylmer, Buckingham, Hull, Masson-Angers), Val-des-Monts	Outaouais	
Eastern Townships School Board	English	Ange-Gardien, Arthabaska, Brome-Missisquoi Regional County Municipality, Drummond Regional County Municipality, Estrie, Henryville, La Haute-Yamaska Regional County Municipality, Noyan, Saint-Césaire, Sainte-Brigide-d'Iberville, Saint-Georges-de-Clarenceville, Saint-Paul-d'Abbotsford, Saint-Sébastien, Venise-en-Québec	Centre-du-Québec, Estrie, Montérégie	
Eastern Shores School Board	English	Bas-Saint-Laurent, Côte-Nord (except L'Île-d'Anticosti and Le Golfe-du-Saint-Laurent) and Gaspésie–Îles-de-la-Madeleine	Bas-Saint-Laurent, Côte-Nord and Gaspésie–Îles-de-la-Madeleine	
Centre de services scolaire de l'Énergie	French	Charette, La Tuque, Mékinac Regional County Municipality, Notre-Dame-du-Mont-Carmel, Saint-Alexis-des-Monts, Saint-Barnabé, Saint-Boniface, Saint-Élie-de-Caxton, Saint-Mathieu-du-Parc and Shawinigan	Mauricie	
English Montreal School Board	English	Côte-Saint-Luc, Hampstead, Montréal (except Lachine, Lasalle, Pierrefonds-Roxboro, Verdun), Montréal-Est, Montréal-Ouest, Mont-Royal, Outremont and Westmount	Montréal	
Centre de services scolaire de l'Estuaire	French	La Haute-Côte-Nord Regional County Municipality and Manicouagan Regional County Municipality	Côte-Nord	
Centre de services scolaire du Fer	French	Caniapiscau Regional County Municipality, Sept-Rivières Regional County Municipality	Côte-Nord	
Centre de services scolaire du Fleuve and des Lacs	French	Les Basques Regional County Municipality and Témiscouata Regional County Municipality	Bas-Saint-Laurent	Guilmont Pelletier
Centre de services scolaire des Grandes-Seigneuries	French	Les Jardins-de-Napierville Regional County Municipality (except Saint-Jacques-le-Mineur) and Roussillon Regional County Municipality	Montérégie	
Centre de services scolaire Harricana	French	Abitibi Regional County Municipality	Abitibi-Témiscamingue	
Centre de services scolaire des Hautes-Rivières	French	Le Haut-Richelieu Regional County Municipality and Saint-Jacques-le-Mineur	Montérégie	
Centre de services scolaire des Hauts-Bois-de-l'Outaouais	French	La Vallée-de-la-Gatineau Regional County Municipality (except Denholm) and Pontiac Regional County Municipality	Outaouais	
Centre de services scolaire des Hauts-Cantons	French	Coaticook Regional County Municipality (except Waterville, Eastern part), Le Haut-Saint-François Regional County Municipality (except Ascot Corner, Cookshire-Eaton, Ouest and Weedon, Northern part), Le Granit Regional County Municipality (except Saint-Ludger, Saint-Robert-Bellarmin and Stratford)	Estrie	
Centre de services scolaire des Îles	French	Communauté maritime des Îles-de-la-Madeleine	Gaspésie–Îles-de-la-Madeleine	
Centre de services scolaire de la Jonquière	French	Jonquière, Larouche, Saint-Ambroise, Bégin	Saguenay–Lac-Saint-Jean	
Centre de services scolaire de Kamouraska - Rivière-du-Loup	French	Kamouraska Regional County Municipality, Rivière-du-Loup Regional County Municipality, Sainte-Louise and Saint-Roch-des-Aulnaies	Bas-Saint-Laurent, Chaudière-Appalaches	
Kativik School Board	Special (English, French and Inuktitut)	Kativik Regional Government, Kiggaluk	Nord-du-Québec	
Centre de services scolaire du Lac-Abitibi	French	Abitibi-Ouest Regional County Municipality	Abitibi-Témiscamingue	
Centre de services scolaire du Lac-Saint-Jean	French	Lac-Saint-Jean-Est Regional County Municipality	Saguenay–Lac-Saint-Jean	
Commission scolaire du Lac-Témiscamingue	French	Témiscamingue Regional County Municipality	Abitibi-Témiscamingue	
Centre de services scolaire des Laurentides	French	Lac-des-Plages, Les Laurentides Regional County Municipality, Les Pays-d'en-Haut Regional County Municipality, Saint-Donat	Lanaudière, Laurentides, Outaouais	
Centre de services scolaire de Laval	French	Laval	Laval	
Lester B. Pearson School Board	English	Baie-D'Urfé, Beaconsfield, Dollard-Des Ormeaux, Dorval, Kirkland, Lachine, LaSalle, L'Île-Dorval, Pierrefonds-Roxboro, Pointe-Claire, Sainte-Anne-de-Bellevue, Senneville, Vaudreuil-Soulanges and Verdun	Montérégie, Montréal	
Centre de services scolaire du Littoral	Special (English and French)	Le Golfe-du-Saint-Laurent (except Petit-Mécatina), L'Île-d'Anticosti	Côte-Nord	
Centre de services scolaire Marguerite-Bourgeoys	French	Western half of the Urban agglomeration of Montreal, with the exception of territories covered by Commission scolaire de Montréal (e.g. Côte-des-Neiges–Notre-Dame-de-Grâce, Le Sud-Ouest and Westmount)	Montréal	
Centre de services scolaire Marie-Victorin	French	Urban agglomeration of Longueuil (except Boucherville and Saint-Bruno-de-Montarville)	Montérégie	
Centre de services scolaire de Montréal	French	Ahuntsic-Cartierville, Côte-des-Neiges–Notre-Dame-de-Grâce, Le Plateau-Mont-Royal, Le Sud-Ouest, Mercier–Hochelaga-Maisonneuve, Rosemont–La Petite-Patrie, Ville-Marie, Villeray–Saint-Michel–Parc-Extension and Westmount	Montréal	
Centre de services scolaire des Monts-et-Marées	French	La Matanie Regional County Municipality and La Matapédia Regional County Municipality	Bas-Saint-Laurent	
Centre de services scolaire de la Moyenne-Côte-Nord	French	Minganie Regional County Municipality (except L'Île-d'Anticosti), Petit-Mécatina	Côte-Nord	
Centre de services scolaire des Navigateurs	French	Lévis, Lotbinière Regional County Municipality (except Saint-Patrice-de-Beaurivage, Saint-Sylvestre and Val-Alain), Saint-Lambert-de-Lauzon and Saint-Henri	Chaudière-Appalaches	
New Frontiers School Board	English	Beauharnois-Salaberry, Châteauguay, Le Haut-Saint-Laurent Regional County Municipality, Léry, Les Jardins-de-Napierville Regional County Municipality (except Napierville, Saint-Cyprien-de-Napierville, Saint-Édouard, Saint-Jacques-le-Mineur, Saint-Michel, Saint-Rémi) and Mercier	Montérégie	
Centre de services scolaire de l'Or-et-des-Bois	French	La Vallée-de-l'Or Regional County Municipality and Cadillac	Abitibi-Témiscamingue	
Centre de services scolaire des Patriotes	French	Boucherville, La Vallée-du-Richelieu Regional County Municipality, Marguerite-D'Youville Regional County Municipality, Saint-Bruno-de-Montarville	Montérégie	
Centre de services scolaire du Pays-des-Bleuets	French	Le Domaine-du-Roy Regional County Municipality and Maria-Chapdelaine Regional County Municipality	Saguenay–Lac-Saint-Jean	
Centre de services scolaire des Phares	French	La Mitis Regional County Municipality and Rimouski-Neigette Regional County Municipality	Bas-Saint-Laurent	
Centre de services scolaire Pierre-Neveu	French	Antoine-Labelle Regional County Municipality	Laurentides	
Centre de services scolaire de la Pointe-de-l'Île	French	Eastern third of the Island of Montreal: Anjou, Montréal-Nord, Rivière-des-Prairies–Pointe-aux-Trembles, Saint-Léonard	Montréal	
Centre de services scolaire des Portages-de-l'Outaouais	French	Aylmer, Chelsea, Hull, La Pêche, Pontiac	Outaouais	
Centre de services scolaire de Portneuf	French	Portneuf Regional County Municipality	Capitale-Nationale	
Centre de services scolaire des Premières-Seigneuries	French	Beauport, Charlesbourg, Lac-Beauport, Lac-Croche, Lac-Delage, La Côte-de-Beaupré Regional County Municipality, Lac-Saint-Charles, L'Île-d'Orléans Regional County Municipality, Sainte-Brigitte-de-Laval and Stoneham-et-Tewkesbury	Capitale-Nationale	
Centre de services scolaire de la Région-de-Sherbrooke	French	Hatley, Hatley Township, North Hatley, Orford (Eastern part), Saint-Denis-de-Brompton, Sherbrooke, Stoke and Waterville (Eastern part)	Estrie	
Centre de services scolaire René-Lévesque	French	Avignon Regional County Municipality, Bonaventure Regional County Municipality and Le Rocher-Percé Regional County Municipality	Gaspésie–Îles-de-la-Madeleine	
Centre de services scolaire de la Riveraine	French	Bécancour Regional County Municipality (except Lemieux) and Nicolet-Yamaska Regional County Municipality	Centre-du-Québec	
Riverside School Board	English	Urban agglomeration of Longueuil, La Vallée-du-Richelieu Regional County Municipality, Le Haut-Richelieu Regional County Municipality (except Henryville, Noyan, Sainte-Brigide-d'Iberville, Saint-Georges-de-Clarenceville, Saint-Sébastien and Venise-en-Québec), Les Maskoutains, Napierville, Pierre-De Saurel, Saint-Cyprien-de-Napierville, Rougemont (except Ange-Gardien, Saint-Césaire and Saint-Paul-d'Abbotsford), Saint-Édouard, Saint-Jacques-le-Mineur, Saint-Michel, Saint-Rémi, Roussillon (except Châteauguay, Léry and Mercier)	Montérégie	
Centre de services de services scolaire des Rives-du-Saguenay	French	Le Fjord-du-Saguenay Regional County Municipality (except Larouche, Saint-Ambroise, Bégin), Sagard and Saguenay (except Jonquière)	Saguenay–Lac-Saint-Jean, Capitale-Nationale	
Centre de services scolaire de la Rivière-du-Nord	French	Argenteuil Regional County Municipality, La Rivière-du-Nord Regional County Municipality, Mirabel (Saint-Antoine, Mirabel-en-Haut, Saint-Canut, Saint-Hermas, Saint-Janvier, Saint-Jérusalem, Sainte-Monique)	Laurentides	
Centre de services scolaire de Rouyn-Noranda	French	Rouyn-Noranda (except Cadillac)	Abitibi-Témiscamingue	
Centre de services scolaire de Saint-Hyacinthe	French	Les Maskoutains Regional County Municipality	Montérégie	
Centre de services scolaire des Samares	French	D'Autray Regional County Municipality, Matawinie Regional County Municipality (except Saint-Donat) and Montcalm Regional County Municipality	Lanaudière	
Centre de services scolaire de la Seigneurie-des-Mille-Îles	French	Deux-Montagnes, Mirabel (Domaine-Vert, Petit-Saint-Charles, Saint-Augustin-de-Mirabel, Saint-Benoît, Sainte-Scholastique), Terrebonne (Western part), Thérèse-De Blainville	Laurentides, Lanaudière	
Sir Wilfrid Laurier School Board	English	Lanaudière, Laurentides, Laval	Lanaudière, Laurentides, Laval	
Centre de services scolaire des Sommets	French	Le Val-Saint-François Regional County Municipality (except Saint-Denis-de-Brompton, Stoke), Les Sources Regional County Municipality (except Saint-Camille, Southern part), Memphrémagog Regional County Municipality (except Hatley municipality, Hatley Township, North Hatley and Orford, Eastern part)	Estrie	
Centre de services scolaire de Sorel-Tracy	French	Pierre-De Saurel Regional County Municipality	Montérégie	
Centre de services scolaire des Trois-Lacs	French	Vaudreuil-Soulanges Regional County Municipality	Montérégie	
Centre de services scolaire du Val-des-Cerfs	French	Brome-Missisquoi Regional County Municipality and La Haute-Yamaska Regional County Municipality	Montérégie	
Centre de services scolaire de la Vallée-des-Tisserands	French	Beauharnois-Salaberry Regional County Municipality and Le Haut-Saint-Laurent Regional County Municipality	Montérégie	
Western Quebec School Board	English	Abitibi-Témiscamingue, Outaouais	Abitibi-Témiscamingue, Outaouais	

Other school boards:

- Ahkwesahsne Mohawk Board of Education, which covers parts of Ontario and Quebec. For high school education, AMBE agrees to pay tuition for high school students to two English-language school districts in Ontario: Upper Canada District School Board (UCDSB) and Catholic District School Board of Eastern Ontario (CDSBEO).
