= James Bay Cree Communications Society =

Radio network operator in Canada

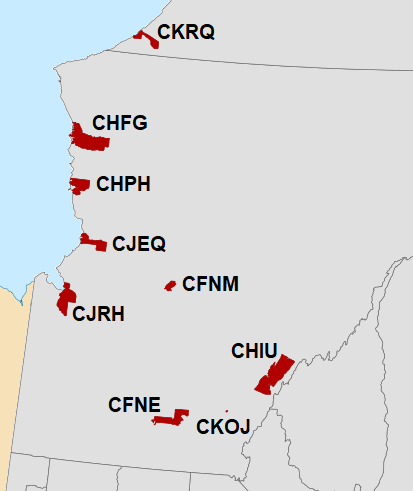
- Type: Community radio network
- Country: Canada

Programming
- Language(s): East Cree

Links
- Webcast: via streamon.fm
- Website: www.creeradio.com

The James Bay Cree Communications Society (JBCCS; Northern East Cree: ᐄᓅ/ᐄᔨ ᔫᐄᔩᒨᔮᐲ) is a non-profit radio network operator serving its members, nine licensed community radio stations throughout the James Bay Eeyou Istchee territory, with daily news and information programming. JBBCS also operates CHIU-FM radio in Mistissini, Quebec, with repeaters in five Cree communities.

JBCCS was founded in 1981 to provide independent daily Cree-language cultural and social programming. The first time it went on the air in Eeyou Istchee was in June 1986 through the CBC. In 1998, JBCCS received funding to build its own network using telephone lines and also provide transmitters to some communities that did not have their own transmitters. The network was officially opened with celebrations in August 2001 in Chisasibi.

== Transmitters ==
JBCCS: CHIU-FM and its affiliates
| City | Identifier | Frequency | Power | RECNet |
|---|---|---|---|---|
| Mistissini | CHIU-FM | 106.5 | 50 | Query |
| Chisasibi | CHFG-FM | 101.1 | 3,000 | Query |
| Eastmain | CJEQ-FM | 89.9 | 42 | Query |
| Nemaska | CFNM-FM | 99.9 | 420 | Query |
| Oujé-Bougoumou | CKOJ-FM | 99.9 | 254 | Query |
| Waskaganish | CJRH-FM | 92.5 | 9,571 | Query |
| Waswanipi | CFNE-FM | 93.9 | 6,200 | Query |
| Wemindji | CHPH-FM | 99.7 | 7,450 | Query |
| Whapmagoostui | CKRQ-FM | 96.5 | 10 | Query |

Rebroadcasters of CHIU-FM
| City | Identifier | Frequency | Power | RECNet |
|---|---|---|---|---|
| Eastmain | CHIU-FM-1 | 106.5 | 42 | Query |
| Oujé-Bougoumou | CHIU-FM-5 | 106.9 | 254 | Query |
| Waskaganish | CHIU-FM-4 | 106.5 | 9,571 | Query |
| Waswanipi | CHIU-FM-2 | 106.5 | 6,200 | Query |
| Wemindji | CHIU-FM-3 | 106.5 | 7,450 | Query |
