= Abel Bosum =

Canadian Cree leader and negotiator

Dr.(h.c.) Abel Bosum CM
- Born: November 4, 1955 (age 70); Dore Lake, Quebec, Canada.
- Occupations: Grand Chief of the Grand Council of the Crees, President of the Eeyou Istchee James Bay Regional Government
- Employer(s): Grand Council of the Crees of Northern Quebec, Eeyou Istchee James Bay Regional Government
- Predecessor: Grand Chief Coon Come
- Parent(s): Lucy Busom, Cypien Caron
- Honours: Doctor of Civil Law, Honoris Causa, from Bishop's University Order of Canada

Abel Bosum CM (born Nov. 4, 1955) is a Cree leader and negotiator who, as of 2019, is serving as Grand Chief of the Grand Council of the Crees of Northern Quebec (Eeyou Istchee) and President of the Eeyou Istchee James Bay Regional Government. He has worked for the Grand Council of the Crees of Quebec since 1977 in various capacities. From 1984 to 1998, Bosum served as the Chief of his home nation, the Oujé-Bougoumou Cree Nation. During his time as chief, he was able to negotiate a multimillion-dollar deal with the governments of Quebec and Canada to build a new village for the nation following the peoples' seventh forcible relocation due to mining and forestry activity in Northern Quebec. In 1998, he became the head negotiator of the Grand Council of the Crees of Quebec. Since 2015, Abel Bosum has also served as President of the Aanischaaukamikw Foundation and of the Aanischaaukamikw Cree Cultural institute.

== Early life ==
Bosum was born the oldest of 11 children of his mother Lucy Bosum. He was born on an island on Dore Lake in Northern Quebec. His father, Cypien Caron, was a French-Canadian from Quebec City, who had a relationship with Lucy Bosum in her settlement near Chibougamau, Quebec. His mother was not allowed to marry his father because of the traditional values of their community, so Bosum did not meet his biological father until he was 53 years old. Bosum's stepfather, Sam Neepoosh, acted as his father figure until Neepoosh died in 1969 when Bosum was 14 years old.

For 10 years, Bosum attended the La Tuque Residential school in La Tuque, Quebec, run by the Missionary Society of the Church of England in Canada, 150 km (93 mi) north of Trois-Rivières. Once Bosum left the school, he worked in underground mines in the Chibougamau area and also took fishing jobs in order to support his family.

== Career ==
=== Grand Council of the Crees ===
Bosum studied business administration and began to work for the Grand Council of the Crees (GCC) (Eeyou Istchee) at age 22, and was named the head of its economic-development department. He held this position for 6 years. According to Bosum, while he worked to help other Cree communities with the GCC, he came to the realisation that his own people were in need of support to help improve their living conditions.

=== Chief of the Oujé-Bougoumou ===
In 1984, at age 28, Bosum became the chief of the Oujé-Bougoumou, a position he held for 14 years. Oujé-Bougoumou, which derives from the Cree for "the place where the people gather", is the Cree nation in which Bosum was born. Over the preceding half century, they had been struggling to survive as a group and were considered "among the most destitute people of the developed world". Between 1926 and 1970, they had been forced to move their settlements seven times because of mineral discoveries that had been made in the region of James Bay, their traditional homeland. Because of the amount of relocation that the nation had undergone, by the 1970s many of its members were living in tarpaper and plywood shacks along logging roads, without running water or heat, and were split into six family groups. Others had moved to other Northern Quebec First Nations communities.

In the late 1970s and early 1980s, Bosum had moved to Val D'Or, Quebec. During the period before he became chief and while he worked for the GCC, Bosum served as a link among members of the community and its elders. When meeting and discussing with the Oujé-Bougoumou elders about the nation's situation, they decided that they wished to take action. With Bosum became chief of the Oujé-Bougoumou, in order to negotiate with the federal and provincial governments to provide his people with more suitable living conditions and to defend and promote the Oujé-Bougoumou's aboriginal rights in Quebec and Canada.

=== Negotiating on behalf of the Oujé-Bougoumou ===
There were several challenges that Bosum faced in his negotiations on behalf of the Oujé-Bougoumou nation. One was their omission from the 1975 James Bay and Northern Quebec Agreement (JBNQA) that provided compensation to Cree people in the region. These stipends from the Quebec provincial government would aid in the development of Cree nations. However, due to the mistake of an employee of the Canadian Federal Department of Indian Affairs in 1936, who had falsely combined the Oujé-Bougoumou nation with the Mistassini Cree nation, located 90 kilometres (56 mi) away, the Oujé-Bougoumou had no recognised land rights in their traditional territory. Thus, they were excluded from the benefits of the JBNQA.

Bosum's negotiation strategy was based on gaining recognition for the Oujé-Bougoumou who had not been able to sufficiently make themselves a priority to provincial and national governments. By having an anthropological study done of his people, Bosum was able to legitimize their clear and distinct identity, which gave them a stronger basis for their claim as a people. Bosum then developed a proposal to allocate land to his people. The nation, which had no financial resources of its own, was supported by the GCC in its struggle.

During the negotiations, Bosum held many meetings among members of the Oujé-Bougoumou, to help bridge generational differences and rebuild the community. He sought to reunite his people who had dispersed without their own territory, and organized a political action group. By uniting the Oujé-Bougoumou around a common vision for their future, allowing elders to pass on their knowledge and traditional culture, Bosum mobilized the younger generation who began to pressure the government to act.

==== Political obstacles ====
The Canadian federal government insisted that the Oujé-Bougoumou have a land base in order to be recognised, but the Quebec government, newly under Parti Quebecois leadership in 1976, "strongly opposed the establishment of any new federal lands in Quebec". After much negotiating effort by Bosum, Premier René Lévesque conceded 2.6 square kilometres (1 sq mi) of territory for an Oujé-Bougoumou village. With this commitment secured, the federal government agreed to begin negotiations to officially recognize the Oujé-Bougoumou.

The Quebec government told the Oujé-Bougoumou that they could only settle in an area not already part of a mining claim or forestry concession, which limited them to areas without commercial opportunities. In the early 1980s, the Oujé-Bougoumou traditional territory was occupied by two municipal areas, six mining sites, and the operations of six forestry companies. In 1985, after the Quebec Liberal Party won control of the government, Bosum tried to negotiate with Premier-elect Robert Bourassa, but they soon reached an impasse.

Bosum contacted MPP John Ciaccia, one of the original JBNQA negotiators, who advised Bosum on how to meet the agreement's requirements. Bosum received a verbal agreement to re-negotiate Oujé-Bougoumou land when the Liberals took office. Bosum was able to expand his people's territory to a similar size of other Cree nations in Northern Quebec. Although Quebec refused to re-open the JBNQA, some Oujé-Bougoumou were registered under the Mistissini nation, which was a member of the agreement. This permitted a strategy of transferring Mistissini land to these people, allowing the Oujé-Bougoumou to come under the treaty. Ciaccia then amended the JBNQA to effect this change.

Bosum also gained leverage through the GCC, which declared that they would not be a signatory party to any government agreement unless the Oujé-Bougoumou were also included. This helped to gain Bosum "several meetings with the prime minister" of Canada and secure more federal commitments. In 1986, this brought him to the point where he could, with the consultation of his people, select a site where their new village would be developed.

=== Human rights issues ===
During the period of negotiations for a new settlement, the Oujé-Bougoumou community lived in makeshift shelters along remote highways. Bosum referred to their condition as an "urgent" one and worked toward safeguarding their health and well-being. He obtained funding to install trailers with washrooms and running water in their six main encampments.

Bosum documented the conditions that the Oujé-Bougoumou were living in and appealed to the media to expose this to the public. The Oujé-Bougoumou were also able "to attend various conferences dealing with human rights and housing where they could bring awareness surrounding their struggles". By emphasizing the human rights violations they were encountering within a first world country, Bosum put more pressure on the provincial and federal governments and negotiations resumed with more commitment on their part.

=== Civil disobedience ===
The federal government offered to provide a maximum of $14 million to finance the new Oujé-Bougoumou settlement. This was lower than the nation thought it needed to address the community's requirements. After much internal discussion, and despite the risk that they might not receive another offer, Bosum refused the offer on behalf of the Oujé-Bougoumou.

After a year of silence from the government, the Oujé-Bougoumou sought to apply pressure by any means. Bosum encouraged his people to occupy the site that they had chosen, despite demands from Energy Resources Quebec that they stop building camps on the land. Bosum and the Oujé-Bougoumou also decided to blockade a nearby forestry road that served as an access road to mining sites and to a popular recreational fishing location, the Assinica River. This strategy significantly affected the commerce in the area by obstructing three resource sectors and "created a lot of tension".

=== A final agreement ===
Raymond Savoie, the provincial minister of natural resources, led a delegation of 15 members from Quebec to develop a comprehensive agreement with the Oujé-Bougoumou, overseen by a federal negotiator to end the grievances. The governments agreed in principle to support the construction of the village and "to provide a social and economic development fund" that would serve to keep the Oujé-Bougoumou people employed and allow them to develop their future economic opportunities. However, the federal government later backed out because it did not agree with the principle of a social and economic development fund. Bosum continued to negotiate solely with the province, which felt more pressure from the civil disobedience. This resulted in a final deal granting the Oujé-Bougoumou financial support for the infrastructure of their village, $20 million towards social and economic development, and 167 square kilometres (64 sq mi) of land. Bosum sought to use the agreement to leverage a contribution from the federal government, launching a media campaign and calling for a new federal negotiator to deal with Cree issues. By the late 1980s and early 1990s, the Oujé-Bougoumou's struggle had become a symbolic one for aboriginal rights in Canada. In 1992, Bosum and Oujé-Bougoumou signed a deal that brought them $43.6 million from the federal government towards the construction of their village.

=== The Oujé-Bougoumou village ===
The village is located at Opémisca Lake, Quebec. Built in consultation with the Oujé-Bougoumou people, it is home to 750 Cree and has been recognized by the United Nations as one of 50 model communities worldwide. It gained this recognition because it was able to fulfill needs of the community while also being an environmentally sustainable and technologically advanced settlement. Although it is located in a remote area of Northern Quebec, its inhabitants have a low level of unemployment and new houses are continuing to be built to meet the demand of young Cree people who wish to gain ownership of their own home. The village is considered to be a unique one in Canada as it provides excellent living conditions in modern houses to Indigenous peoples. The design of the village is one that seeks to reflect the "values and culture of the Oujé-Bougoumou people."

== Later career ==
=== Village chief ===
As chief of the Oujé-Bougoumou, Bosum worked to facilitate the social and economic development for his people in their new home. This involved securing access to essential natural resources so that his community could be financially self-sustaining and confronting social issues that his people had developed during their social upheavals. At a certain point, "over 90 per cent of Oujé-Bougoumou adults had alcohol problems, and that has fallen below 50 per cent." Bosum sought to prove that aboriginal groups in Canada can make good use of the resources provided to them by the government and that these communities can exist in a politically and economically independent state.

=== GCC negotiator ===
In 1998, based on his success in advocating for his own nation's rights with the government of Quebec, Bosum was chosen to negotiate on behalf of the Crees of Quebec as the GCC Quebec negotiator. In 2000, he was able "to break a two-year-long impasse between the Crees and Quebec".

In 2002, Bosum led the negotiations of the Agreement Respecting a New Relationship Between the Cree Nation and the Government of Quebec (a.k.a. La Paix des Braves), which better integrate the Crees into the economic activities of their region and also allows them to make decisions pertaining to their own development with the funds they receive from the provincial government.

Bosum has negotiated on behalf of the Cree Board of Health and Social Services of James Bay and for the Cree School Board, and represented the GCC in discussions with neighbouring aboriginal nations. He also negotiated on behalf of the GCC and individual Cree communities with five mining companies "to ensure financial benefits, employment and environmental protection measures" be provided to Cree people in the areas where mining activities are conducted.

Between 2000 and 2012, he negotiated with Quebec on the JBNQA, reaching a new agreement for shared governance of the region, providing "Cree jurisdiction over the traditional Cree territory". The agreement also developed new Cree governance structures.

=== Charitable work ===
Bosum was chosen as president of the Aanischaaukamikw Foundation and Cree Cultural Institute on April 2, 2015. He helped to raise $25.6 million to develop the non-profit institute, from "Cree and non-Cree governments, corporate partners, private foundations and individuals".

=== Grand Chief ===
Bosum was elected for a four-year term as Grand Chief of the Council of the Crees of Northern Quebec on July 24, 2017, with 55.9% of the vote share, defeating the outgoing Deputy Grand Chief Rodney Mark. He succeeded Grand Chief Matthew Coon Come who had previously served five terms as Grand Chief over a 40-year period.

As Grand Chief he has overseen the adoption of Bill C-70 into law by the Canadian government. The bill provides the Eeyou Istchee with a higher degree of political self-determination as it allows the GCC to "create its own culturally relevant laws and have more say on a variety of local governance issues, including development". The bill is an extension of the rights provided in the JBNQA. According to Bosum, as expressed in his address to the Standing Senate Committee on Aboriginal Peoples, it as an important step to advancing towards full Cree self-governance.

== Recognition ==
In 1998, Bosum received Canada's National Aboriginal Achievement Award in the category of Community Development, for his work with the Oujé-Bougoumou Cree community.

In June 2016, Bosum received an honorary doctorate of civil law from Bishop's University in Sherbrooke, Quebec. In 2018, he was appointed a member in the Order of Canada, an honour recognizing "outstanding achievement, dedication to the community and service to the nation".
