= East Cree =

Algonquian dialects of Quebec, Canada

- ᐄᔨᔫ ᐊᔨᒨᓐ Īyiyū Ayimūn (Northern) ᐄᓅ ᐊᔨᒨᓐ Īnū Ayimūn (Southern)
- Native to: Canada
- Region: Eeyou Istchee, Quebec
- Native speakers: 400 (2016)
- Language family: Algic: Algonquian; Cree-Montagnais-Naskapi; Cree; East Cree
- Writing system: Canadian Aboriginal syllabics

Language codes
- ISO 639-3: Either: crl – Northern crj – Southern
- Glottolog: sout2978 southern nort1552 northern
- ELP: East Cree
- Linguasphere: 62-ADA-af (northern); 62-ADA-ag (southern)
- Northern East Cree is classified as Vulnerable by the UNESCO Atlas of the World's Languages in Danger.

Eeyou / Eenou "human being"
- Person: Eeyou / Eenou ᐄᔨᔫ / ᐄᓅ
- People: Eeyouch / Eenouch ᐄᔨᔫᒡ / ᐄᓅᒡ
- Language: Eeyou / Eenou Ayimūn ᐄᔨᔫ / ᐄᓅ ᐊᔨᒨᓐ
- Country: Eeyou / Eenou Istchee ᐄᔨᔫ / ᐄᓅ ᐊᔅᒌ

East Cree, also known as James Bay (Eastern) Cree, and East Main Cree, is a group of Cree dialects spoken in Quebec, Canada on the east coast of lower Hudson Bay and James Bay, and inland southeastward from James Bay. Cree is one of the most spoken non-official aboriginal languages of Canada. Four dialects have been tentatively identified including the Southern Inland dialect (Iyiniw-Ayamiwin) spoken in Mistissini, Oujé-Bougoumou, Waswanipi, and Nemaska; the Southern Coastal dialect (Iyiyiw-Ayamiwin) spoken in Nemaska, Waskaganish, and Eastmain; the Northern Coastal Dialects (Iyiyiw-Ayimiwin), one spoken in Wemindji and Chisasibi and the other spoken in Whapmagoostui. The dialects are mutually intelligible, though difficulty arises as the distance between communities increases.

East Cree is not considered an endangered language thanks to the large population of younger people who speak it (Mela S.; Mali A. 2009). There are estimated to be more than 18,000 first-language speakers.

== Phonology ==
The long vowels *ē and *ā have merged in the northern coastal dialects but remain distinct in the southern coastal and southern inland dialects; southern inland has merged *s with *š, which remain distinct in the coastal dialects. Neighbouring Naskapi has both.

In East Cree there are thirteen consonants:

		Bilabial	Alveolar	Postalveolar	Velar	Labiovelar	Glottal
Stop	Voiceless	p	t		k	kʷ	
Stop	Voiced	b					
Nasal		m	n				
Fricative			s	ʃ			h
Affricate				tʃ			
Glide				j		w	

There are eight vowels:

	Front	Central	Back
High	i		u
Mid-high	ɪ		ʊ
Mid	e	ə	
Low		a	

== Morphology ==
In East Cree, words are formed by primary derivation, secondary derivation, and composition.

=== Primary derivation ===
Words constructed by primary derivation, are made up of two or more stems, that are not words that stand on their own.

For example, the verb:

pisu- piyi- u
initial final {personal suffix}
stem stem inflection
She/he/it goes slow.

=== Secondary derivation ===
Words constructed by secondary derivation, are made up of core word stems and at least one other stem-building elements.

For example, the verb ᐱᓱᐱᔨᐦᑖᐤ pisupiyihtaau s/he makes it go slow is made up of the stem of the existing verb ᐱᓱᐱᔨᐤ pisupiyiu and the causative final -htaa.

pisu	piyi	htaau
Initial	Final	Causative final/Personal suffix
Initial		Final
Stem	Stem	Inflection

English Translation: she/he/it makes it go slow.

=== Composition ===
Words constructed by composition contains independent elements, like two existing word stems, or a preform and another word stem.

For example, the noun mishtikunaapaau is made by conjoining two other noun stems:

ᒥᔥᑎᒄ + ᓈᐹᐤ = ᒥᔥᑎᑯᓈᐹᐤ
mishtikw {} napaau {} mishtikunaapaau
wood {} man {} carpenter

Independent elements forming with Verbs

miyu	chiishinkaau
preverb	verb stem
good	it is day

'It is a good day'

== Gender, number, and person ==
=== Gender ===
Gender is a grammatical distinction. East Cree has Animate and Inanimate gender differentiation. However, it is not possible to know for sure if words are animate or inanimate at first glance.

Animate nouns refer to humans, animals, and general living creatures, as well as some plants and some personal belongings, such as pants and sleds. To indicate the plural, you generally add the suffix -ich; in some cases, when the word ends in -w, you drop the -w and add -uch.

Number	Word	Translation
Singular	paayikw awaashish	one child
Plural	niishu awaashishiich	two children

Some more examples of Animate nouns are:

Number	Word	Translation
Single	piyichiis	pair of pants
Plural	piyichiisich	pairs of pants
Single	mishtikw	tree
Plural	mishtikuch	trees
Single	utaapaanaaskw	sled
Plural	utaapaanaaskuch	sleds

Inanimate plural is formed with the suffix -h.

Number	Word	Translation
Single	paayikw mischin	one shoe
Plural	niishu mischinh	two shoes

=== Number ===
As shown above we can see that the Number is dependent on the Gender therefore if we have an Animate word then the ending for the plural will be ich in most cases and in some cases when the word ends in a w the ending will be uch after you drop the w. On the other hand, for Inanimate words the ending to indicate the plural will be adding an h to the end of the word.

=== Person ===
To indicate possession, noun stems take a personal prefix. In East Cree there are Independent and Dependent nouns.

Independent nouns are ones that can appear without personal prefixes. Therefore, they can stand alone as a word, and if you want to indicate to whom it belongs to, you would add the prefix. Example shown below.

Gender	Number	Noun	Translation
Inanimate	Singular	mischisin	shoe
Inanimate	Singular	nimischisin	my shoe
Inanimate	Plural	mischisinh	shoes
Inanimate	Plural	nimischisinh	my shoes

We can see that for this example the noun is Independent because it can stand alone, also, we see that it is an inanimate noun because the plural form adds an h at the end when the plural is indicted. Please refer to Gender to understand the relationship of Animate and Inanimate nouns in respect to gender.

Dependent nouns are those that can not stand alone without a prefix. These types of nouns express kinship, body parts, and personal belongings, like certain pieces of clothing.

Gender	Noun	Translation
Animate	nimushum	my grandfather
Inanimate	nishtikwaan	my head

Below is the table of Prefixes and Suffixes for some Dependent Nouns that are Animate

Possessors	Animate noun	Translation
2	chimis	your older sister
1	nimis	my older sister
2p	chimisiwaau	your (plural) older sister
21p	chimisinuu	our (including you) older sister
1p	nimisinaan	our (excluding you) older sister
3	umis-h	his/her older sister(s)
3pe	umisiwaauh	their older sister(s)
3'(p)	umisiyuuh	his/her/their older sister(s)

== Classification on verbs ==
East Cree adds suffixes on verbs in order to distinguish classes based on two factors, transitivity and gender. When referring to transitivity it means if the verbs is intransitive or transitive, and when referring to gender, it means if the subject or object of the verb is animate or inanimate. When we are looking at intransitive verbs, we see that the animacy of the subject matters. However, when we are looking at a transitive verb, we see that the animacy of the object is what matters. Below is a table that describes the differences between the transitive, intransitive and animate, inanimate in regards to the verbs and their role.

	Animate	Inanimate
One Role (Intransitive)	masinaasuu	masinaateu
Two Roles (Transitive)	masinahweu	masinaham

Verbs	Gloss	Classification
masinahweu	She writes him (his name) down	Transitive Animate (VTA)
masinaham	She is writing it	Transitive Inanimate (VTI)
masinaasuu	She (her name) is written down	Animate Intransitive (VAI)
masinaateu	It is written	Inanimate Intransitive (VII)

Different classes have different endings. Below is a table that describes the different ending for each classification. The classifications are, Verb Transitive Animate (VTA), Verb Intransitive Inanimate (VII), Verb Transitive Inanimate (VTI), Verb Animate Intransitive (VAI).

Verb Intransitive Inanimate (VII) only have one role (intransitive) filled by an inanimate subject. These verbs have endings such as, -n or vowels.

Verb	Gloss
chiinaau	It is pointed
wiihkan	It is tasty
waaskamaau	It is a clear day
yuutin	It is windy

Verb Transitive Inanimate (VTI) have two roles (transitive) filled by an animate subject and an inanimate object. These verbs have an -am ending. They can be found in all orders with all persons.

Verbs	Gloss
masinaham masinahiikaniyuu Ruth	Ruth is writing a book
iiskupatam utaas	He is pulling up his socks
manaham chiistaaskwaanh	She is pulling out nails

Verb Transitive Animate (VTA) have two roles (transitive) filled by an animate subject and an animate object. Both the agent and the patient are animate. They can end in many endings, but one of them is -eu.

Verb	Gloss
misinahuweu utawaashiimh Luci	Luci is enrolling her child
chispahweu waahkupaanikiikh Daisy	Daisy is mixing fish-egg pancakes
wepaashtimeu umuusuuyaanimh Marguerite	Marguerite let her moosehide blow away

Verb Animate Intransitive (VAI) usually only have one role (intransitive) filled by an animate subject. They end in -n and -vowels'.

Verbs	Gloss
masinaasuu nuushimish	My grandchild's name is on the list
weyikaapuu Daisy che niimit	Daisy stands ready to dance
utaamikachisheshin John	John falls on his behind

== Space and time ==
=== Space ===
In East Cree there are Demonstrative Pronouns that are distinguished by three areas. The Proximal noted by uu, which can occur with suffixes. The proximal is used to indicate either a person or an object that is close to the speaker and in sight of the speaker. Then there is the Distal noted by an at the beginning of a word. The distal is used to indicate something or something specific that is slightly farther away from the speaker. In addition, there is the Remote noted as (a)naa or (a)nwaa and is used to indicate that someone or something is far away from the speaker. In East Cree, there are two sets of demonstratives. One is to use in a normal speech setting which means, to just speak to one another and the other form is used with gestures such as hand gestures, to point or signal.

Below is a table demonstrating the relation of prefixes on the words using the proximal, distal, and the remote for Animate Pronouns. Simple Speech no gestures required.

Pronoun	Proximate		Obviative
Pronoun	Singular	Plural	Singular or Plural
Proximal	uu	uuchii / uuch	uuyuuh / uuyeyuuh
Distal	an	anichii / anich	anuyuuh / anuyeyuuh
Remote	(a)naa / (a)nwaa	(a)nechii / (a)nech	(a)neyuuh

Below is a table demonstrating the relation of prefixes on the words using the proximal, distal, and the remote for Inanimate Pronouns.

Pronoun	Proximate		Obviative	
Pronoun	Singular	Plural	Singular	Plural
Proximal	uu	uuyuuh / uuhii	uuyuu / uuyeyuu	uuyuuh / uuyeyuuh
Distal	an	aniyuuh / anihii	aniyuu / aniyeyuu	aniyuuh / aniyeyuuh
Remote	(a)ne	(a)neyuuh / (a)nehii	aneyuu	aneyuuh

=== Time ===
East Cree tense is marked on the preverbs attached to the pronoun. There is an indicative of past and future tense on the preverb such as, che, chii, kata, chika, nika, chechii, wii, nipah, chipah, e, kaa, uhchi. These preverbs indicate different aspects of the tense and when you use each one. Below is a table that shows the different environment for each preverb.

Preverb	Usage	Example	Gloss
che	Future marker for conjunct verbs	1. che nikamuyaan; 2. che nikamuyin; 3. che nikamut	1. I will sing; 2. You will sing; 3. S/he will sing
chii	Past tense marker	1. nichii miichisun; 2. chichii miichisun; 3. chii miichisuu	1. I ate; 2. You ate; 3. S/he ate
kata	Future preverbs for independent verbs used only with 3p.	kata miichisuu utaakushiyiche	S/he will eat this evening
chika	future preverb for independent verbs used with second and third persons	1. chika miichisuu utaakushiyiche; 2. chika miichisun utaakushiche	1. S/he will eat this evening; 2. S/he will eat this evening
nika	future preverb for independent verbs used with first persons	nika miichisun utaakushiche	I will eat this evening
chechii	conjunct preverb	1. wanichischisuu chechii petaat aniyuu akuhpiyuu; 2. nituweyimaau chechii ihtuutahk	1. He forgot to bring that jacket; 2. I want him to do it
chii	can always preceded by a future preverb	1. nika chii ihtuhten; 2. chika chii ihtuten; 3. chika chii ihtuteu; 4. che chii ihtuhtewaane	1. I can go; 2. You can go; 3. S/he can go; 4. If I can go
wii	want	1. niwii miichisun; 2. chiwii miichisun; 3. wii miichisuu	1. I want to eat; 2. You want to eat; 3. S/he wants to eat
nipah	should used with first persons	shaash nipah kuushimuun uu e ishpishipayich	I should be in bed at this hour
chipah	should used with second and third persons	shaash chipah kuushimuun uu e ishpishipayich	You should be in bed at this hour
e	conjunct preverb	1. nimiyeyihten e masinahiicheyaan; 2. chimiyeyihten e masinahiicheyin; 3. miyeyihtam e masinahiichet	1. I like to write; 2. You like to write; 3. S/he likes to write
kaa	Conjunct preverb	1. kaa ayimiyaan; 2. kaa ayimiyin; 3. kaa ayimit	1. When I spoke; 2. When you spoke; 3. When s/he spoke
uhchi	from, because used in the negative independent with namui or in the negative conjunct with ekaa	1. namui uhchi chii nipaau e chii kushtaachit; 2. namui nuuhchi chii nipaan e chii kushtaachiyaan	1. S/he could not sleep because s/he was afraid; 2. I could not sleep because I was afraid

== Word order ==
In East Cree, all six word orders SVO, SOV, OVS, OSV, VOS, and VSO are grammatical. Below is a chart to see how they could all be used to construct the sentence, The children killed some ducks

Word order	Example	Gloss
SVO	awasisak nipahewak sisipa	children killed ducks
SOV	awasisak sisipa nipahewak	children ducks killed
VSO	nipahewak awasisak sisipa	killed children ducks
VOS	nipahewak sisipa awasisak	killed ducks children
OVS	sisipa nipahewak awasisak	ducks killed children
OSV	sisipa awasisak nipahewak	ducks children killed

== Case ==
There is a ranking system of the grammatical functions where the subject outranks the object. This appears on the transitive verb with an animate object in order to indicate the person hierarchy, whether it be aligned (DIRECT) or crossed (INVERSE). Below is a table that demonstrates the hierarchy and the functions.

For the Direct we can see that the Proximant is reflected on the Subject and the Agent while the Obviative is reflected through the Object and the Patient.

For the Inverse we can see that the Proximate is reflected inversely through the Object and then through the Patient, then we can see that the Obviative is reflected through the Subject and then through the Agent.

For the Passive we can see that the Proximate is reflected through the Subject then through the Patient. Then we see the Obviative through the Object and then the Agent.

The notation in the example is represented with an X to indicate the switch.

direct	inverse	passive
S/he likes her/him PROX {} OBV	S/he likes her/him OBV {} PROX	S/he {is liked} PROX {}
PROX______OBV	PROX______OBV	PROX_______ OBV
↓__________↓	______X________	↓___________↓
SUBJ_____ OBJ	SUBJ______ OBJ	SUBJ______ (OBJ)
↓____________↓	↓___________↓	______X______
Agent______ Patient	Agent______ Patient	Agent______ Patient
Miyayim -e -u like -DIR(3›3') -3	Miyeyim -iku -u like -INV(3‹3') -3	Miyeyim -aakanu -u like -PASS -3

== Possession ==
East Cree marks its possessions on the nouns by adding a secondary suffix to a possessed noun with a third-person prefix. See examples below that indicate the addition of suffixes and prefixes. There is a difference in which suffix and prefix you use if the noun in questions is animate or inanimate.

------	Noun	Possessed Noun	Verb "S/he has..."	Verb "I have..."
Word	maschisin	umaschisin	umaschisinuu	numaschisinin
Gloss	shoe	his/her shoe	umaschisinuu	I have shoes
Word	awaash	utawaashishiimh	utawaashishiimuu	nutawaashishiimin
Gloss	child	his/her child	s/he has a child/children	I have a child/children

== Complements ==
In East Cree sometimes one sentence is contained within another sentence, this is known as a subordinate or embedded clause. The verb of the subordinate clauses have conjunct suffixes and often a conjunct preverb. Below is a table detailing the subordinate clauses.

The bold part of the sentence indicates the subordinate clause in both languages.

------	Complement clauses
Sentence	nichischeyihtaan e waapach waskahiik
Gloss	I know that the house is white
Sentence	nichii kukwechimaau wiyaapaach waaskah
Gloss	I asked if the house is white
Sentence	nichischeyihten ekaa waapaach waaskahiika
Gloss	I know that the house is not white

Adverbial clauses is when the subordinate clause provides information about the time at which something happened, or the frequency with which it happens. Below are some examples of adverbial clauses.

------	Adverbial Clauses
Sentence	kaa nipaat chitakushiniyuuh
Gloss	While she was sleeping, he arrived
Sentence	iy aahkusich-h maatuu
Gloss	Whenever s/he is sick, it rains

Relative Clauses is when the subordinate clause functions as a complement to a noun. Below is an example.

------	Relative Clauses
Sentence	Waapahtam muuhkumaan kaa piikupayiyic
Gloss	She sees the knife that is (was) broken (the broken knife)
