= James Bay Cree hydroelectric conflict =

The James Bay Cree hydroelectric conflict refers to the resistance by James Bay Cree to the James Bay Hydroelectric Project and the Quebec Government, beginning in 1971.

== The First Phase ==
The Quebec government announced plans in April 1971 for a hydroelectric project in the Baie-James region of northern Quebec. It followed typical practice of neither informing the Cree people living in the area, nor estimating the consequences of the development as far as they were concerned. The Cree decision to present a unified front in negotiations in order to protect their lands and future autonomy provided the foundation for increased contact between the different communities and the start of a regional identity for the James Bay Cree.

The Quebec Association of Indians, an ad hoc association of native northern Quebecers, won an injunction on 15 November 1973 blocking the construction of the hydroelectric project. They were represented by their lawyer James O'Reilly, who became one of the foremost experts in Indian law. The day after the Malouf judgement was issued, two appeals were launched, one against the merits of the Malouf judgement and one an application to the effect that the Malouf judgement should be suspended pending the hearing. One week later the Court of Appeal of Quebec heard the case. The three judges, Lucien Tremblay, Jean Turgeron, and P.C. Casey, suspended the Malouf judgement until the Court of Appeal was ready to hear the case. In 1974 the Court of Appeal overturned the Malouf judgement. Although the judgement was suspended seven days later and overturned in 1974, the Malouf judgement confirmed Quebec's legal obligation to negotiate a treaty covering the territory, even as construction proceeded.

The Grand Council of the Crees, representing the Cree villages of Northern Quebec, was created in 1974 to better protect Cree rights during negotiations with the governments of Quebec and Canada.

The governments of Canada and Quebec and representatives from each of the Cree villages and most of the Inuit villages signed the James Bay and Northern Quebec Agreement on November 11, 1975. The Agreement offered, for the first time, a written contract which explicitly presented the rights of indigenous people. The result of the hydroelectric treaty became an example for future conflicts in other communities with issues of the same nature. It allowed hydroelectric development on Cree lands in exchange for financial compensation, greater autonomy, and improvements to health care, housing, and educational services. The Agreement strengthened the social and political position of the Cree, but drove a split between them and other native groups by establishing what was seen as an undesirable precedent by which native land claims could be resolved. The intention of the Cree was not to 'sell out' and sacrifice a part of their Cree culture to compensate for their place in Canadian society, but to secure and uphold as much of their rooted lifestyle and land as possible, maintaining the power of their native traditions while carefully amalgamating into the economically dominant society.

Even during these negotiations, construction of roads and dams for the hydroelectric projects never stopped for an appreciable length of time. The Cree had no legal way of stopping or suspending this development, so even if they had succeeded in obtaining complete recognition of their claims, much of the land would have already been flooded. They were well aware of the fact that the damage to their culture and land was inevitable, and desired reimbursement for its repair. Unfortunately, the federal and provincial governments repeatedly failed to fulfil the monetary promises made in the Agreement, and the Cree were forced to use their own compensation money for improvements, such as those to basic water and sewage systems, that would otherwise have waited a long time for a solution.

The new village of Chisasibi, on the southern shore of La Grande River, replaced the Fort George settlement on an island at the mouth of the river in 1981. The Fort George settlement itself had been home to people forced to relocate by earlier hydroelectric development.

The construction of first phase of the James Bay Project was completed in 1986.

== The Second Phase ==
In 1986 the Quebec government announced plans for the second phase of the project. The Grande-Baleine hydroelectric project involved the creation of three power plants and the flooding of about 1,700 square kilometres of land (3% of the Grande-Baleine watershed) upstream from the Whapmagoostui village.

The Grande-Baleine project represented a source of employment for the citizens of Quebec, and an alteration to the local ecosystem to environmentalists. For the Cree and Inuit in the area, however, the project would not only cause serious change to the environment, but would also have a social impact. Attempts to estimate the social impact of the hydroelectric projects (usually included within the environmental assessment) are complicated by unresolved dilemmas such as whether the changes were caused by the project itself or if they were beginning to happen before the project came to fruition.

With the Grande-Baleine project, the Cree community of Whapmagoostui found themselves facing new social changes that they had avoided up to that point. Unfortunately for the community, Hydro-Quebec and the sector of the government most involved in the project took the position that any social effects on the communities were not their problem, and would not impact decisions made regarding the project.

The Cree and Inuit worked together with environmentalists to protest the development, but the debate of the Grande-Baleine project was reduced to the issue of political power (whether the Inuit and Cree were to be allowed to exercise their interests in the development and what form it would take), instead of accommodating other (non-political) interests.

In 1991, under the direction of Grand Chief Matthew Coon Come, the Cree launched a very visible protest of the Grande-Baleine project in New York City.

Following agreements in 1989 and 1992 with the Governments of Canada and Quebec, a new Cree village, Oujé-Bougoumou, was created in 1992 for the 600 Cree of the Chibougamau area.

The Quebec government canceled the Grande-Baleine hydroelectric project in 1994, in part due to public concern about its potential impact on the environment and on First Nations communities.

== Continuing Impact ==
The Cree and the Government of Quebec signed the landmark Agreement Respecting a New Relationship Between the Cree Nation and the Government of Quebec, also known as La Paix des Braves, in 2002. Far more than an economic deal, this was seen as a "nation to nation" agreement. The agreement paved the way for the construction of a final element of the original James Bay Project, the Eastmain-1 power station. The Cree and the Government of Quebec signed an agreement in 2004 providing for the joint environmental assessment of the Rupert River Diversion. The Rupert River Diversion was approved in 2007 and construction began.
