= Grand Council of the Crees =

Political body representing the Cree Nations

Grand Council of the Crees (GCCEI) Eeyou Istchee ᐄᔨᔨᐤ ᐊᔅᒌ Grand conseil des cries
- Country: Canada
- Province: Quebec
- Nation: Eeyou Istchee
- Website: cngov.ca

Offices
- Head: Nemaska (ᓀᒥᔅᑳᐤ)
- Additional: Montreal; Ottawa; Quebec City

Grand Council
- Grand Chief: Paul-John Murdoch
- Deputy Grand Chief: Linden Spencer
- Chiefs: List: Annie Mapachee-Salt (Washaw Sibi); Raymond Shanoush (Eastmain); Gaston Cooper (Ouje-Bougoumou); Daisy House (Chisasibi); Clarence Jolly (Nemaska); Greta Whiskeychan-Cheechoo (Waskaganish); Irene Neeposh (Waswanipi); Michael Petawabano (Mistissini); Robbie Kawapit (Whapmagoostui); Christina Gilpin (Wemindji); Allan Jolly (MoCreebec Eeyoud)
- Representatives: List: Thomas Shem (Chisasibi); Jimmy R. Trapper (Washaw Sibi); Elijah Sandy (Whapmagoostui); Danny Tomatuk (Wemindji); Gordon Blueboy (Waskaganish); Gaston Cooper (Ouje-Bougoumou); John Henry Wapachee (Nemaska); Mr. John Longchap (Mistissini); Mr. Kenneth Gilpin (Eastmain); Marcel Happyjack (Waswanipi)

Eeyou / Eenou "human being"
- Person: Eeyou / Eenou ᐄᔨᔫ / ᐄᓅ
- People: Eeyouch / Eenouch ᐄᔨᔫᒡ / ᐄᓅᒡ
- Language: Eeyou / Eenou Ayimūn ᐄᔨᔫ / ᐄᓅ ᐊᔨᒨᓐ
- Country: Eeyou / Eenou Istchee ᐄᔨᔫ / ᐄᓅ ᐊᔅᒌ

Areas under the jurisdiction of the CRA marked in red

The Grand Council of the Crees (Eeyou Istchee) or the GCC(EI) (ᐄᔨᔨᐤ ᐊᔅᒌ in Cree), is the political body that represents the approximately 20,000 Cree people (who call themselves "Eeyou" or "Eenou" in the various dialects of East Cree) of the territory called Eeyou Istchee ("The People's Land") in the James Bay and Nunavik regions of Northern Quebec. The Grand Council has twenty members: a Grand Chief and Deputy-Grand Chief elected at large by the Cree people, the Chiefs elected by each of the ten communities, and one other representative from each community.

The current Grand Chief Norman A. Wapachee assumed the role and responsibilities of Grand chief on March 31, 2025. With the current position of Deputy Grand Chief being vacant until Election are held which election date set for July 22, 2025. Later during the week of March 24th, Mandy Gull-Masty during a Board Council Meeting, she was asked by Chief Irene Neeposh of the Cree First Nation Of Waswanipi to reconsider her Nomination for the Candidacy of Liberal Candidate for Abitibi—Baie-James—Nunavik—Eeyou. And in a resolution passed Mandy Gull-Masty resigned on March 31st, 2025 beginning her campaign as a Liberal Candidate for the region. The Grand Council's head office is located in the Cree community of Nemaska, with other offices and embassies in Montreal, Ottawa and Quebec City.

== History ==
The Grand Council was formed in 1974 in response to the James Bay Cree hydroelectric conflict, which had already been underway since 1971. When the James Bay Project was first announced, Eeyou Istchee was still governed by a traditional political structure. That political structure was organized to exploit the resources of Eeyou Istchee by their traditional way of life. The land of Eeyou Istchee was divided into smaller territories, each headed by a leader or "ucimâu", that were resource management units and a means of distributing the Eeyou people over a vast territory. So the Crees organized themselves at a council of Cree leaders to represent their rights at the negotiations between the Cree Nation and the Quebec and Canadian governments, which led to the signing of the James Bay and Northern Quebec Agreement in November 1975.

On July 24, 2012, the Quebec government signed an accord with the Eeyou Nation that would result in the abolition of the municipality of Baie-James and the creation of a new regional government, the Eeyou Istchee James Bay Regional Government.

== Cree Nation Government ==
The Cree Nation Government (Gouvernement de la nation crie, ᐄᓅᑎᐯᔨᐦᒋᒉᓲ, ᐄᔨᔫᑎᐯᔨᐦᒋᒉᓲ) formed in 1978 under the name Cree Regional Authority (CRA) and serves as the administrative authority of the Cree Nation of Eeyou Istchee and provides programs and services to its communities. The CRA is responsible for environmental protection and is also the legal body representing the nation to provincial and federal administrations.

While the CNG is a separate legal entity from the Grand Council of the Crees (Eeyou Istchee), they have identical membership, board of directors, governing structures and are de facto managed and operated as one organization by the Cree Nation.

An accord signed between the Cree Nation and the Quebec government on July 24, 2012, called for the status and name of the Cree Regional Authority to be changed to the Cree Nation Government. The Cree Nation Government currently has 309 employees.

== Eeyou Eenou Police Force ==
Founded in 2011, the Eeyou Eenou Police Force (EEPF) operates under the administration of the Cree Nation Government and covers the entirety of the Eeyou Istchee territory. It has regional detachments in nine of the Cree Communities in Quebec with the headquarters being in Chisasibi.

== Political developments ==
The Grand Council of the Crees has been active in asserting the right of the Cree Nation to determine their own future, in the event that Quebec secedes from Canada. In October 1995, the Grand Council issued a "Message regarding the rights of the Crees and other Aboriginal Peoples of Canada", which stated, in part:

Now in 1995, although we live in a modern and democratic state, protected by the Canadian Constitution with its Charter of Rights and Freedoms, our people and our territory may once again be transferred from sovereign to sovereign, this time from Canada to what may become the newly independent state of Québec. And although there is now a United Nations, with a Universal Declaration of Human Rights and a vast array of international human rights instruments that should protect us, a process has been set in motion that would forcibly remove the Crees from Canada, and incorporate us and our lands in this new state.

— Matthew Coon Come

A few days prior to the October 30, 1995, province-wide referendum on secession from Canada, the Grand Council facilitated a referendum within Eeyou Istchee on the question of whether the Crees should be authorized to separate from an independent Quebec, in order to remain part of Canada. Over 96% of participating voters chose to remain in Canada.

Grand Chief Matthew Mukash is considered a traditionalist and fought against the Great Whale hydroelectric project in the 1990s, alongside the Grand Chiefs Matthew Coon Come and Billy Diamond. In 2002, he opposed the signing of the Agreement Respecting a New Relationship Between the Cree Nation and the Government of Quebec (Paix des Braves), a comprehensive 50 year political and economic agreement with the Government of Quebec, and as well as the 2002 and 2004 agreements with Hydro-Québec on the joint development of the hydroelectric resources of the Rupert River.

Elected in late 2005 as Grand Chief, in replacement of Ted Moses, Matthew Mukash is opposed to the Rupert River Diversion which is undergoing joint Quebec-Cree environmental assessment since 2004. Mukash has advocated with the Government of Quebec and Hydro-Québec to pursue wind power as an alternative source of economic development and energy. His other main political goals are to prepare a constitution, build sovereignty, encourage nation-building, and move Cree leadership back to Eeyou Istchee from Montreal and Ottawa.

== Grand Chiefs ==
- Paul-John Murdoch, 2025-present
- Norman A. Wapachee, 2025-2025
- Mandy Gull-Masty, 2021-2025
- Abel Bosum, 2017–2021
- Matthew Mukash, 2005-2009
- Matthew Coon Come, 1987-1999 and 2009-2017
- Ted Moses, 1984-1987 and 1999-2005
- Billy Diamond, 1974-1984

== Deputy Grand Chiefs ==
- Linden Spencer, 2025-present
- Norman A. Wapachee, 2021-2025
- Mandy Gull-Masty, 2017-2021
- Rodney Mark, 2013-2017
- Ashely Iserhoff, 2005-2009 and 2009-2013
- Paul Gull, 2002-2005
- Matthew Mukash, 1999-2002
- Voilet Pachanos, 1996-1999
- Kenny Blacksmith, 1993-1996
- Romeo Saganash, 1990-1993
- George Wapachee, 1988-1990
- Philip Awashish, 1974-1988

== Eeyou communities of the Grand Council ==
- Chisasibi
- Eastmain
- Mistissini
- Nemaska – seat of the GCCEI and CNG (CRA)
- Oujé-Bougoumou
- Waskaganish
- Waswanipi
- Wemindji
- Whapmagoostui
- Washaw Sibi Eeyou
