= Vieux-Comptoir =

Abandoned community in Quebec, Canada

- Abandoned locality
- Location within Quebec
- Coordinates: 52°36′12″N 78°42′19″W
- Country: Canada
- Province: Quebec
- Region: Nord-du-Québec
- TE: Jamésie
- Time zone: UTC-5 (EST)
  - Summer (DST): UTC-4 (EDT)

Vieux-Comptoir (French pronunciation: [vjø kɔ̃twaʁ]) was a small Cree community at the mouth of Vieux-Comptoir River on Old Factory Bay (known in French as Baie du Vieux Comptoir) off James Bay in Quebec, Canada. The community was established as a trading post in the 17th century, but abandoned when the Cree were relocated to Wemindji, Quebec, 45 kilometres (28 mi) to the north in 1959.

The locality was previously known by the English names of Factory River, Old Factory, and Old Factory River. The name refers to it being the location of a former trading post (then known as a "factory"), while the newer name is the approximate French equivalent.

== History ==
The site had been used by the Hudson's Bay Company (HBC) since the 1680s, but abandoned temporarily in 1686 when the other HBC forts on James Bay were captured by the French.

In 1692–1693, James Knight spent the winter there and found remnants of a post, likely built by the French since the indigenous called the island "Frenchman's Island". However, James White called it "Old Factory Island" and "Old Factory River", referring to the abandoned trading post.

The HBC continued to use the area from time to time as wintering spot for ships throughout the eighteenth century. Mica was discovered there, and a mine was operated by the HBC for some time, but proved unprofitable. Hence, the river was also called Mica or Isonglass River.

A fur trade post was established there by the North West Company in 1804, but only operated until 1806.

In 1935, free traders established another post at Old Factory, and in 1938, the HBC also opened one, operating as an outpost of the Eastmain post until 1942, when it became a full trading post. Other names for the post were Old Factory River, Gilpin's Island, Frenchman's Island, and Vieux Comptoir. A Cree community began to settle at the post, complete with an Anglican church and rectory.

In 1959, the post was closed, and its business was moved to Wemindji (then known as Paint Hills or New Factory/Nouveau-Comptoir). By 1974, most buildings had deteriorated or collapsed. The locality is still used by the Cree of Wemindji as a summer camp.
