= CHPH-FM =

First Nations community radio station in Wemindji, Quebec

Coordinates: 53°00′08″N 78°43′22″W

- Wemindji, Quebec; Canada
- Frequency: 99.7 MHz

Programming
- Format: community radio

Ownership
- Owner: Wemindji Telecommunications Association

Technical information
- Class: B
- ERP: horizontal polarization only: 7.45 kWs average 24.65 kWs peak
- HAAT: 110.5 metres (363 ft)

CHPH-FM is a First Nations community radio station that operates at 99.7 FM in Wemindji, Quebec, Canada. The station also broadcasts a low-power relay as CHPH-FM-1 at 92.5 FM.

The station is owned by Wemindji Telecommunications Association. From a 200-foot tower on a 250-foot hill overlooking Wemindji, CHPH FM Radio reaches 110–125 km beyond the community, providing programming to about 100 km of the unserved James Bay highway. CHPH-FM effective radiated power is 24,650 watts (peak). FM programming services include local community productions and regional network news and features from the James Bay Cree Communications Society.

In addition, Wemindji territory has regional 2-way radio for public safety, transportation and community businesses and IP phone capability.

The president of the Association is Joseph Blackned.
