= Ted Moses =

Canadian politician

Ted Moses OQ
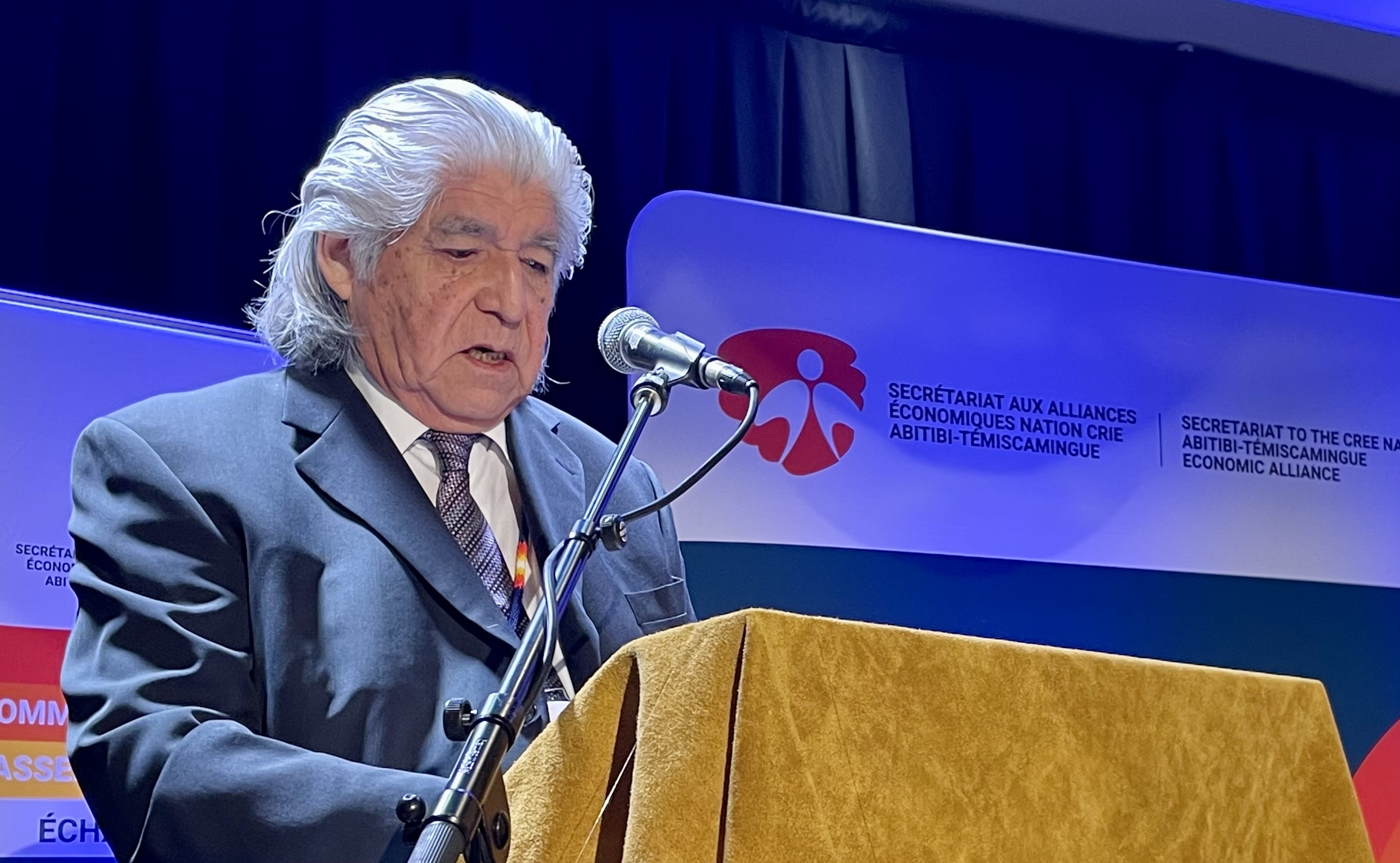
- Born: 1950 (age 75–76); Eastmain, Quebec, Canada
- Notable work: Grand Chief of the Grand Council of the Crees, Paix des Braves

Ted Moses OQ (born 1950) is a Canadian politician from Eastmain, a small remote village in northern Quebec, Canada. He is a former Grand Chief of the Grand Council of the Crees. In addition, Mr. Moses is a recipient of the title of "Officer" of the National Order of Quebec.

== Biography ==
Moses was born in Eastmain, Quebec, in the James Bay region of Quebec. After studying at Ryerson University in Toronto and McGill University in Montreal in school administration, he was Chief and Mayor of the village of Eastmain from 1987 to 1990. He was elected Grand Chief of the Crees in 1984. Moses is active on the international stage, speaking at numerous events about aboriginals and tolerance. He is the recipient of two honorary Doctorates of Law.

== Career ==
=== La Paix des Braves ===
Moses assisted in obtaining recognition for the James Bay Crees as a "Non-Governmental Organization" in consultative status to the United Nations. He currently serves as the Ambassador of the Council at the UN. Moses was also involved in the signing of the "Paix des Braves" (French for "Peace of the Brave"). Along with Premier Bernard Landry and the government of Quebec, Moses and the Council developed this agreement. It has been described as a "nation to nation" declaration of peace after long legal disputes between Cree leaders and the Government of Quebec. The payments from the Quebec Government contained in the 1975 James Bay and Northern Quebec Agreement. These obligations were transferred from the Quebec Government to the Cree government.

The Paix des Braves brought great controversy, but also many economic and social benefits to the Crees. The Cree communities voted in community referendums to accept the Paix des Braves. The approval was over 65%, with a majority voter turnout. The Paix des Braves now provides 77 million dollars per year to the Cree communities from the Quebec Government. These payments indexed by electricity, mineral, and forestry sales from the Cree traditional territory will last for 45 years. These payments from the Quebec Government will be replaced with payments from a Cree Heritage fund set up by the Cree by investing 15% of the present payments from the Quebec Government.

This was and still is widely seen as a symbolic show of mutual respect and recognition of the national status and right to self-determination of each people. It was put into concrete action when Ted Moses surprised many by supporting the re-election of Landry's Parti Québécois in the 2003 Quebec election after years of oppositional attitudes of the Cree people towards Quebec sovereignty. He declared:

"I support Bernard Landry... my friend and my brother... and I will recommend to my people to support the actual Member of Parliament of Ungava, Michel Létourneau."

(Ungava is the electoral riding of the Cree of Quebec.) Moses and the PQ leader have indeed become close: Landry invited Moses to his wedding on 26 June 2004.

During the campaign for the 2004 federal election, Moses also stated that he was counting on the Bloc Québécois, the PQ's brother party in at the federal level of Canadian politics, to defend aboriginal rights at the federal level. Moses did not formally support the BQ, saying that it "did not need it" because of its considerable lead in polls. Furthermore, he declared in a speech in Europe that Quebec and the Paix des Braves were examples to follow for the world regarding relations with aboriginal peoples.

== After La Paix ==
In 2005, Moses was defeated in his bid for Grand Chief of the Crees of Eeyou Istchee by a wide margin, taking 31.9% of the vote . He was again defeated in the second round of voting, this time taking 43.3% of the vote .
