= Centre de services scolaire des Hautes-Rivières =

French-speaking school system in Quebec

The Centre de services scolaire des Hautes-Rivières is a francophone school service centre in the Canadian province of Quebec. It comprises several primary schools and high schools across municipalities in the Montérégie region.

The commission was overseen by a board of elected school trustees.
