= Centre de services scolaire de Sorel-Tracy =

The Centre de services scolaire de Sorel-Tracy is a school service centre that serves 5 francophone school districts in the Canadian province of Quebec. It comprises several primary schools and high schools across Sorel-Tracy in the Montérégie region. The old commission was overseen by a board of elected school trustees.
