= Centre de services scolaire de Saint-Hyacinthe =

Centre de services scolaire de Saint-Hyacinthe is a French-language, school service centre operating in the region of Monteregie in Quebec, Canada.

== Elementary schools ==
- École Assomption
- École Plein-Soleil
- École au Coeur-des-Monts
- École Roger-LaBrèque
- École aux Quatre-Vents
- École Roméo-Forbes
- École Bois-Joli - Sacré-Coeur
- École Saint-André
- École de la Croisée
- École Sacré-Coeur
- École de la Rocade
- École Saint-Charles-Garnier
- École des Moissons
- École Saint-Damase
- École Douville
- École Saint-Hugues - Saint-Marcel
- École Henri-Bachand
- École Saint-Jean-Baptiste
- École La Présentation
- École Saint-Joseph - Spénard
- École Lafontaine
- École Saint-Nazaire
- École Larocque
- École Saint-Pierre
- École Maurice-Jodoin
- École Saint-Sacrement
- École Notre-Dame-de-la-Paix
- École Saint-Thomas-d'Aquin
- École Notre-Dame
- École Sainte-Rosalie

== Secondary schools ==
- École secondaire Casavant
- École secondaire Fadette
- Polyvalente Hyacinthe-Delorme
- Polyvalente Robert-Ouimet
- École Raymond

== Others ==
École René-Saint-Pierre

École professionnelle de Saint-Hyacinthe

Centre de formation des Maskoutains
