= Centre de services scolaire de la Vallée-des-Tisserands =

The Centre de services scolaire de la Vallée-des-Tisserands is a school service centre that serves 5 francophone school districts in the Canadian province of Quebec. It comprises several primary schools and high schools across municipalities in the Montérégie region. The commission was overseen by a board of elected school trustees until year 2020.
