= Centre de services scolaire du Val-des-Cerfs =

Francophone educational center in Quebec, Canada

The Centre de services scolaire du Val-des-Cerfs is a francophone school service centre for five districts in the Canadian province of Quebec.

It comprises several primary schools and high schools across twenty-nine municipalities in the Montérégie region. The commission is overseen by a board of elected school trustees. It is the result of the 1998 reforms in education which caused the fusion of the school districts Des Cantons, Des Rivières and Davignon.

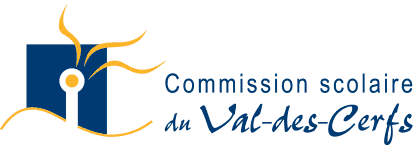
Commission scolaire du Val-des-Cerfs' logo

== Schools ==
In September 2014, Commission scolaire du Val-des-Cerfs covered 46 schools.

=== Elementary schools (35) ===
- École de L'Assomption, (Granby)
- École Ave Maria, (Granby)
- École Centrale, (Saint-Joachim-de-Shefford)
- École Curé-A.-Petit, (Cowansville)
- École de la Chantignole, (Bromont)
- École de la Clé-des-Champs, (Dunham)
- École de la Moisson-d'Or, (Saint-Alphonse-de-Granby)
- École de l'Étincelle, (Granby)
- École de l'Orée-des-Cantons, (Waterloo)
- École des Bâtisseurs (Granby)
- École du Phénix, (Granby)
- École du Premier-Envol, (Bedford)
- École Eurêka, (Granby)
- École Joseph-Poitevin, (Granby)
- École Mgr-Desranleau, (Bedford)
- École Mgr-Douville, (Farnham)
- École Notre-Dame-de-Lourdes, (Saint-Armand)
- École Roxton Pond, (Roxton Pond)
- École Saint-André, (Granby)
- École Saint-Bernard, (Granby)
- École Saint-Édouard, (Lac-Brome)
- École Saint-François-d'Assise, (Frelighsburg)
- École Saint-Jacques, (Farnham)
- École Saint-Jean, (Granby)
- École Saint-Joseph, (Granby)
- École Saint-Joseph, (Notre-Dame-de-Stanbridge)
- École Saint-Léon, (Cowansville)
- École Saint-Romuald, (Farnham)
- École Saint-Vincent-Ferrier, (Bromont)
- École Sainte-Cécile, (Sainte-Cécile-de-Milton)
- École Sainte-Famille, (Granby)
- École Sainte-Thérèse, (Cowansville)
- École Sutton, (Sutton)

=== High schools (7) ===
- École de la Haute-Ville, (Granby)
- École Jean-Jacques-Bertrand, (Farnham)
- École Joseph-Hermas-Leclerc, (Granby)
- École L'Envolée, (Granby)
- École Massey-Vanier, (Cowansville)
- École Mgr-Desranleau, (Bedford)
- École Wilfrid-Léger, (Waterloo)
- École Secondaire du Verbe Divin, (Granby) (only for transportation) (Private School)

=== School for adults (2) ===
- Campus de Brome-Missisquoi (CBM), (Cowansville). Used to be known as Centre d'éducation des adultes et de formation professionnelle, renamed in 2008 during its expansion.
- Centre régional intégré de formation (CRIF), (Granby). Inaugurated in 1967.
