= Centre de services scolaire des Patriotes =

The Centre de services scolaire des Patriotes is a school service centre that serves 5 school districts in the Canadian province of Quebec. It comprises several primary schools and high schools across Marguerite-D'Youville and La Vallée-du-Richelieu; Boucherville and Saint-Bruno-de-Montarville municipalities in the Montérégie region. The commission is overseen by a board of elected school trustees.
