= Jamie Moses (Eeyou Istchee) =

Jamie Moses is a member of the Cree Nation of Eastmain in Eeyou Istchee, James Bay. He was the first Cree language commissioner for the Cree Nation Government from 2020 to 2025.

== Early life ==
Jamie Moses was born approximately in 1982 (the exact date is unknown) in Eastmain, Eeyou Istchee.

He was raised by his grandparents who are one of the last generations living mostly from the land, both his parents attended French-language residential schools in Quebec. His grandfather taught him how to harvest and how to respect the land and all animals. He enjoys hunting, fishing, and trapping.

Jamie’s grandparents, Sinclair and Bessie (Gilpin) Moses, influenced his passion for learning more about Eeyou Istchee’s way of life. Moreover, Jamie decided not to continue his studies due to his profound interest in learning about his culture. Sinclair mentored Jamie about the importance of harvesting and respecting land and animals in Eeyou Istchee. Hunting, fishing, and trapping were among the activities Jamie enjoyed most. Jamie spent his teenage years with his grandparents in the bush, which empowered him to engage actively within his community.

On September 19, 2008, Moses married his wife, Cindy, and they have five children named Joni, Joshua, Jaylene, Jolene, and Jamieson.

== Career ==
As a teenager, Jamie became a member of the Eastmain Youth Council and was later elected Youth Chief. In 2003, he worked on archaeological studies along the Rupert River and the Eastmain River with archaeologist David Denton. From 2005 to 2021, he served as Cultural Coordinator for his community in Eastmain, where he organized events such as Winter Journeys, Canoe Brigades, Snowshoe Walks, and other cultural activities.

Jamie has also served as a board member for several Cree organizations and entities, including the Eastmain Youth Council, the Cree Nation Youth Council, the Aanischaaukamikw Cree Cultural Institute, and the CreeOutfitting and The Eeyou Istchee Tourism Association. Jamie currently serves on the board of the Cree Board of Health and Social Services of James Bay, representing Eastmain. In 2019, he was appointed Language Commissioner of Eeyou Istchee. In 2021, he became a board member of the Eeyou Marine Wildlife Board.

== The Cree Language Act ==
The Cree Language Act was passed on September 17, 2019, this was the first law passed by the Cree Government. The Language Act was created with the goal of Cree language revitalization. The Act also requires appointing a Cree language commissioner, a position that has a five-year term. This position was filled by Jaime Moses, he is Eeyou Istchee's first Cree Language Commissioner. The title of the Commissioner was changed to ᐄᔨᔨᐅᔨᒧᐧᐃᓐ ᑭᓂᐧᐋᐱᒫᑭᓐ᙮ (iiyiyiuyimuwin kiniwaapimaakin) after discussions and consultations with Cree elders. The Commissioner is in charge of revitalizing Cree language through initiatives such as policy development, mentorship programs, language laws, and increased language education. As of 2025, Moses announced that he will be stepping down from the Commissioner role to begin new opportunities.

== Achievements and awards ==
Language preservation

In early 2021, Jamie was appointed as the first language commissioner for ; which is a five-year term. He has been working over 16 years in the field of culture and language across Eeyou Istchee. Raised by his grandparents, who were fluent in the Cree language, he has mastered the language over the span of his life while simultaneously working on the land.

Black Bear Harvesting

Jamie Moses has recently harvested black bear, even though he has been learning throughout his life. He shares his knowledge on bear harvesting to his community and helps facilitate traditional bear feast. Bear being the most respected animal within the Cree, the feast and harvesting customs are integral for traditional and community gathering.

== Social media ==
Jamie Moses has a TikTok page, where he interacts with the Cree youth (@jamiemoses).

Documentaries:

- The Wolverine: The Fight of the James Bay Cree (By: Ernest Webb)
- Learning from Elders (from the Cree School Board)
- The Eeyou Way of Life: Caretakers of Cree Investments

Podcasts:

- Little House Podcast#12: Stories of Our People with Jamie Moses & Daniel Mark-Stewart

Talks and Interviews:

- Cree language challenges in today's era (from the Cree Knowledge FESTIVAL du savoir Cri)
- CBC Listen
  - Jamies Moses from Eastmain was re-elected as the Cree Health Board representative for his community
  - Jamie Moses discovered a way to help youth learn about Cree language and culture: TikTok

== Traditional media ==
Jamie Moses has written for CBC in 2021 about the bear harvesting tradition in Eeyou Istchee. He was also interviewed by Dorothy Stewart from the CBC when he was appointed to Cree language commissioner.
