= CHFG-FM =

Radio station in Chisasibi, Quebec

Coordinates: 53°46′05″N 78°53′29″W

- Chisasibi, Quebec; Canada
- Frequency: 101.1 MHz

Programming
- Format: First Nations community radio

Ownership
- Owner: James Bay Cree Communications Society; (Chisasibi Telecommunications Association)

History
- First air date: 2000

Technical information
- Licensing authority: CRTC
- ERP: 3,000 watts
- HAAT: 58.5 metres (192 ft)

Links
- Website: creeradio.com

CHFG-FM is a First Nations community radio station that operates at 101.1 FM in Chisasibi, Quebec, Canada.

The station is owned by the James Bay Cree Communications Society, through licensee Chisasibi Telecommunications Association.
