= Centre de services scolaire des Hauts-Bois-de-l'Outaouais =

School board in Quebec

The Centre de services scolaire des Hauts-Bois-de-l'Outaouais (CSSHBO) is a school service centre that offers educational services for about 3,000 people in Outaouais, Quebec. It provides 19 primary schools, three secondary schools, and two vocational schools, as well as an adult education centre providing general training at three sites. It covers a territory the size of Belgium that includes the Valleys of Gatineau and Pontiac, whose principal urban centres are Maniwaki, Gracefield, Fort-Coulonge, and Shawville.

== Primary schools ==
Maniwaki sector:

- Académie Sacré-Coeur (Maniwaki)
- Couvent du Christ-Roi (Maniwaki)
- Pie-XII (Maniwaki)
- Laval (Ste-Thérèse-de-la-Gatineau)
- Dominique-Savio (Montcerf-Lytton)
- Saint-Boniface (Bois-Franc)
- Sacré-Cœur (Grand-Remous)
- Sainte-Croix (Messines)

Heart of Gatineau sector:

- Sacré-Coeur (Gracefield)
- Notre-Dame-de-Grâce (Bouchette)
- Reine-Perreault (Blue Sea)
- Saint-Nom-de-Marie (Lac-Ste-Marie)
- Sainte-Thérèse (Cayamant)

Pontiac sector:

- Poupore (Fort-Coulonge)
- Saint-Pierre (Fort-Coulonge)
- Notre-Dame-du-Sacré-Coeur (Isle-aux-Allumettes)
- de l'Envolée (Campbell's Bay))
- Sainte-Anne (Ïle-du-Grand-Calumet)
- Sainte-Marie (Otter-Lake)

== Secondary schools ==
- École secondaire Cité étudiante de la Haute-Gatineau (Maniwaki)
- École secondaire Sacré-Coeur (Gracefield)
- École secondaire Sieur-de-Coulonge (Fort-Coulonge)

== Vocational schools ==
- Centre de formation professionnelle de la Vallée-de-la-Gatineau (Maniwaki)
- Centre de formation professionnelle Pontiac (Fort-Coulonge)

== Adult education ==
- Établissement des adultes CSHBO (Maniwaki, Gracefield et Fort-Coulonge)
