= Centre de services scolaire des Sommets =

The Centre de services scolaire des Sommets is a French-language, school board operating in the province of Quebec, Canada. The school board, based in Magog, covers towns in the Eastern Townships of Quebec, specifically the towns of Magog, Asbestos, Windsor in an area around the city of Sherbrooke.

The school board covers a combined population of over 8550 primary and secondary students.

== Elementary schools ==
- École du Christ-Roi, Saint-Camille
- École Hamelin, Wotton
- École Masson, Danville
- École Notre-Dame-de-l'Assomption, Saint-Georges-de-Windsor
- École Notre-Dame-de-Lourdes, Saint-Adrien
- École de la Passerelle, Asbestos
- École de la Tourelle, Asbestos
- École du Baluchon, Potton
- École Brassard-Saint-Patrice, Magog
- École des Deux-Soleils, Magog
- École Dominique-Savio, Sainte-Catherine-de-Hatley
- École du Jardin-des-Frontières, Stanstead
- École Saint-Barthélemy, Ayer's Cliff
- École Saint-Jean-Bosco, Magog
- École Saint-Pie-X, Magog
- École Sainte-Marguerite, Magog
- École du Val-de-Grâce, Eastman
- École de l'Arc-en-Ciel, Saint-François-Xavier-de-Brompton
- École de la Chanterelle, Valcourt
- École Notre-Dame-de-Bonsecours, Bonsecours
- École Notre-Dame-de-Montjoie, Racine
- École Notre-Dame-des-Érables, Sainte-Anne-de-la-Rochelle
- École Notre-Dame-du-Sourire, Saint-Claude
- École du Plein-Coeur, Richmond
- École Saint-Gabriel, Windsor
- École Saint-Laurent, Lawrenceville
- École St-Philippe, Windsor

== High schools ==
- École secondaire de l'Escale, Asbestos
- École secondaire de la Ruche, Magog
- École secondaire de l'Odyssée, Valcourt
- École secondaire du Tournesol, Windsor
