= Cree School Board =

School district in northern Quebec, Canada

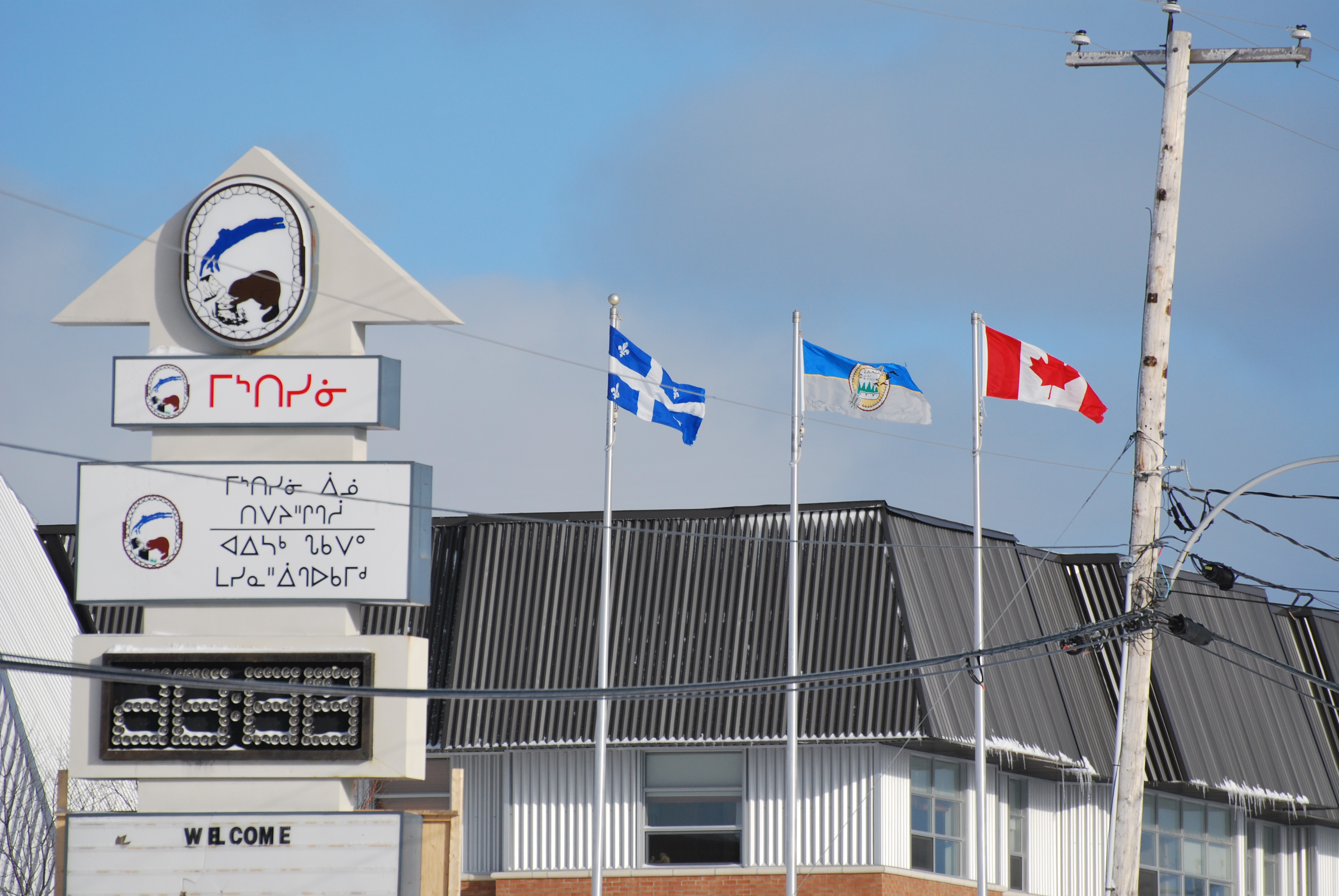
The administrative centre neighbours the Mistissini town hall.

Cree School Board (CSB; French: Commission scolaire Crie; Cree: ᐄᔨᔨᐤ ᒋᔅᑯᑎᒫᒑᐧᐃᓐ) is a school district in northern Quebec, headquartered in Mistissini, with an additional office in the James Bay Eeyou School in Chisasibi.

While most Quebec school boards are categorized by language, CSB is categorized as a "special-status school board". It offers education in Cree, French, and English.

== History ==
In 1978 the CSB had been established.

Initially the headquarters was in Val-d'Or but they later moved to Mistissini. The school board also established a high school in Chisasibi, with boarding services for students from some distant communities.

== Schools ==
PreK through high schools:

- Wabannutao Eeyou School (ᐧᐋᐸᓅᑖᐤ ᐄᔨᔫ ᒋᔅᑯᑕᒫᒉᐅᑲᒥᒄ) (Eastmain)
- Luke Mettaweskum School (ᓘᒃ ᒣᑕᐧᐁᔥᑲᒻ ᒋᔅᑯᑕᒫᒉᐅᑲᒥᒄ) (Nemaska)
- Waapihtiiwewan School (ᐧᐋᐸᐦᑏᐧᐁᐧᐊᓐ ᒋᔅᑯᑕᒫᒉᐅᑲᒥᒄ) (Oujé-Bougoumou)
- Maquatua Eeyou School (ᐧᒫᑯᐧᑖᐤ ᐄᔨᔨᐤ ᒋᔅᑯᑎᒫᑑᑭᒥᒄ) / Joy Ottereyes Rainbow Memorial School (Wemindji)
- Badabin Eeyou School (ᐹᑖᐱᓐ ᐄᔨᔨᐤ ᒋᔅᑯᑎᒫᑑᑭᒥᒄ) (Whapmagoostui)
  - In 1982 the school building was constructed, and in 1989 the first class of high school students graduated.
  - Includes the Meeyow Bee Nooquow School

Grade 5 through high schools:

- Wiinibekuu School (ᐧᐄᓂᐯᑰ ᒋᔅᑯᑕᒫᒉᐅᑲᒥᒄ) (Waskaganish)

High schools:

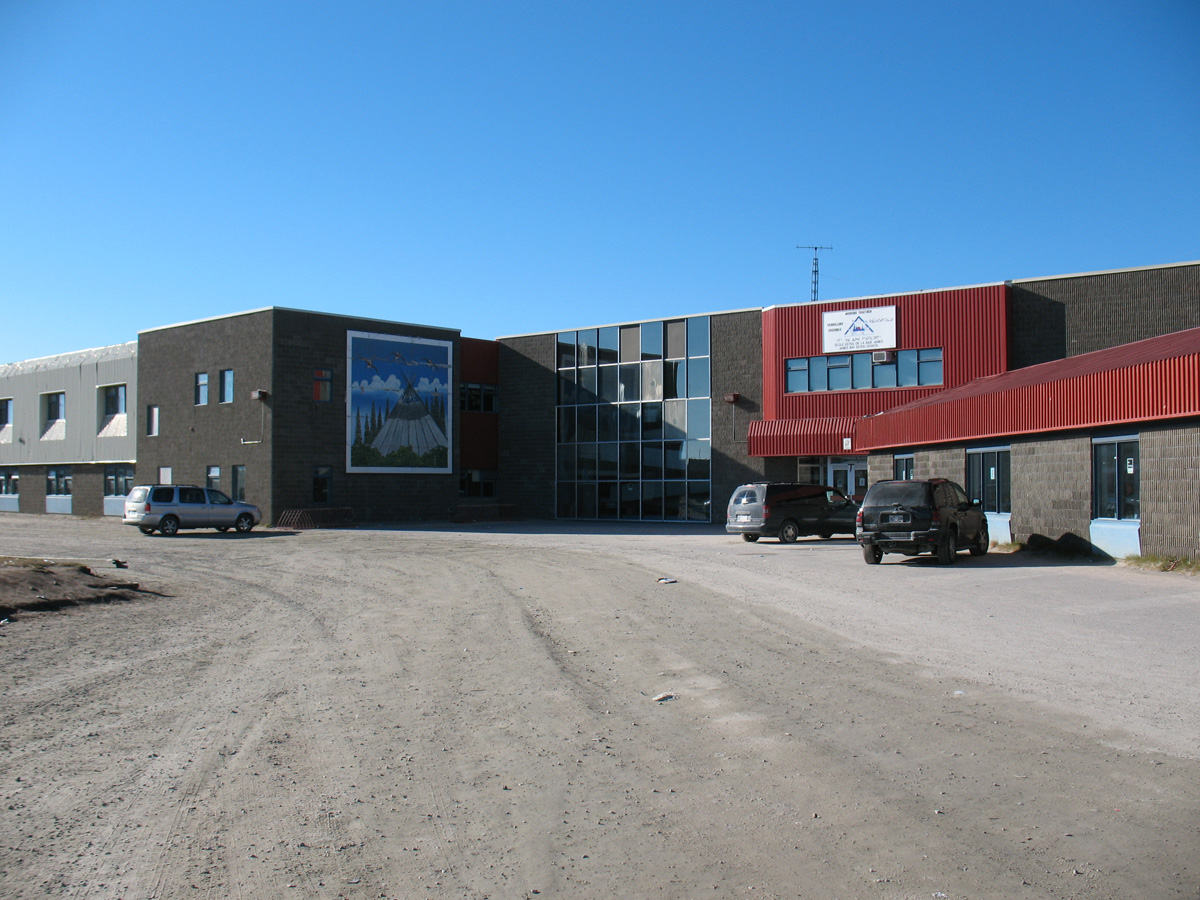
James Bay Eeyou high school in Chisasibi.

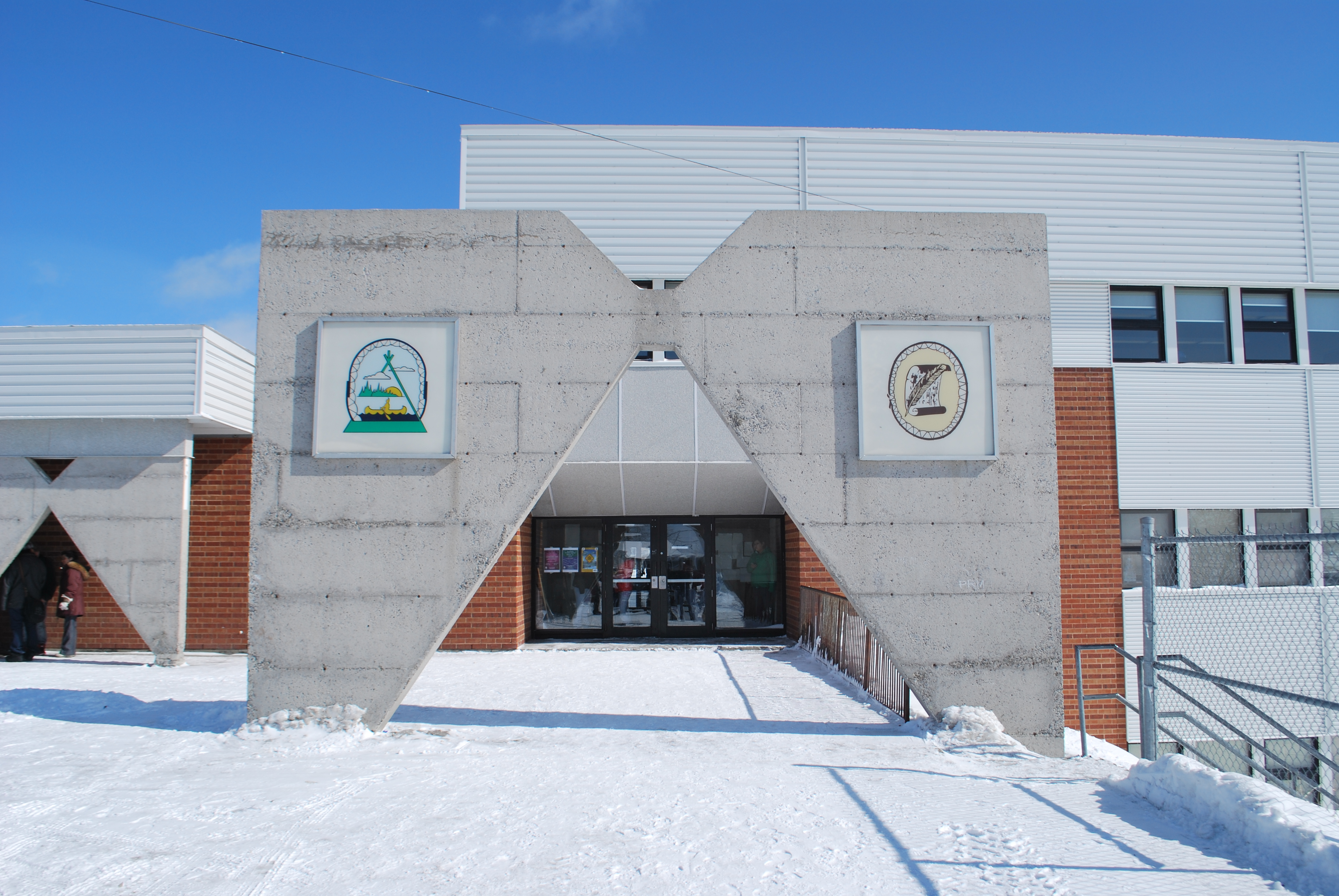
Voyageur Memorial high school in Mistissini.

- James Bay Eeyou School (JBES; French: École Eeyou De La Baie James; Cree: ᒉᐃᒥᔅ ᐯᐃ ᐄᔨᔨᐤ ᒋᔅᑯᑎᒫᒑᐅᑭᒥᒄ) (Chisasibi)
  - Previously the school provided boarding services for high school students for students from other villages of the James Bay region: Eastmain, Whapmagoosui, and Wemindji as at the time all high school classes in the region were in Chisasibi.
- Voyageur Memorial High School (ᕛᔨᒐᕐ ᑳ ᐃᔥᐹᒡ ᒋᔅᑯᑕᒫᒉᐅᑲᒥᒄ) (Mistissini)
- Willie J. Happyjack Memorial School (ᐧᐃᓖ ᒉᐄ ᐦᐋᐲᒑᒃ ᒋᔅᑯᑕᒫᒉᐅᑲᒥᒄ) (Waswanipi)

PreK/Elementary schools:

- Waapinichikush Elementary School (ᐙᐱᓂᒋᐦᑯᔥ ᒋᔅᑯᑎᒫᑑᑭᒥᒄ) (Chisasibi)
- Voyageur Memorial Elementary School (VMES; ᕛᔨᒐᕐ ᑳ ᐃᔥᐹᒡ ᒋᔅᑯᑕᒫᒉᐅᑲᒥᒄ) (Mistissini)

Elementary schools:

- Rainbow Elementary School (ᐲᓯᒧᔮᐲ ᒋᔅᑯᑕᒫᒉᐅᑲᒥᒄ) (Waswanipi)

PreK-Grade 4:

- Annie Whiskeychan Memorial Elementary School (ᐋᓃ ᐧᐄᔥᑲᒑᓐ ᒋᔅᑯᑕᒫᒉᐅᑲᒥᒄ) (Waskaganish)

PreK-Kindergarten:

- Jolina Gull-Blacksmith Memorial School (Waswanipi)

Other:

- Sabtuan Regional Vocational Training Centre (Waswanipi)

== See also ==
Indigenous school boards in Quebec:

- Ahkwesahsne Mohawk Board of Education
- Kativik Ilisarniliriniq (school board for Nunavik)
