= Paix des Braves =

Canadian treaty, signed in 2002

The Agreement Respecting a New Relationship Between the Cree Nation and the Government of Quebec (dubbed as the Paix des Braves, French for "Peace of the Braves" by the Parti Québécois government) is an agreement between the Government of Quebec, Canada, and the Grand Council of the Crees. It was signed on February 7, 2002 in Waskaganish, Jamésie, Quebec, after decades of court battles between the Cree and the Government of Quebec. The name was inspired by the 1701 Great Peace of Montreal, also known as "La Paix des Braves".

== Summary ==
Negotiated by Parti Québécois Premier of Quebec Bernard Landry and Grand Chief of the Crees Ted Moses, the Agreement implemented existing obligations of the Quebec government to the Cree people under section 28 of the James Bay Agreement of 1975 after decades of court battles. It provided for the sharing of revenues and joint management by the Cree and the Quebec government of mining, forestry and hydroelectric resources on traditional Cree lands in Quebec, known as the Eeyou Istchee. It also aimed to develop a more balanced participation in employment and revenue in natural resource industries for the Cree in Northern Quebec.

Its preamble recognizes the treaty as a symbolic "nation to nation" agreement between the Cree and Quebec. This 50-year agreement allows for joint jurisdiction between the Quebec government and Cree in the seven municipalities of James Bay and surrounding territories. In exchange, the Cree consented to hydroelectric development of the Eastmain and Rupert Rivers by Hydro-Québec.

The Agreement followed recommendations made by the Royal Commission on Aboriginal Peoples, abandoning the notion that First Nation peoples in Canada must extinguish claims to their territories in order to settle land claim disputes. Moses declared that Quebec became a leader in the application of the principles recognized by the United Nations regarding aboriginal development. Quebec will be able to show that the respect of aboriginals is compatible with its national interest. Furthermore, he stated that the federal government should inspire itself with this agreement in its negotiations with Natives across the country. Moses also lauded Premier Landry's new attitude: "He understands that the Crees must be part of Quebec's vibrant economy and a living part of its economic and cultural mosaic." Matthew Coon Come, a former Grand Chief who had opposed the Quebec Government (notably on hydroelectric development) and the sovereigntist movement in the past, said: "This is the type of cooperation and financial engagement that the federal government should offer to other native nations", calling on the federal government to follow the recommendation of the Royal Commission.

== See also ==
- Politics of Quebec
- James Bay Agreement
