= Mistissini =

Mistissini ᒥᔅᑎᓯᓃ (Mistisinî)
- Terre réservée crie (Cree reserved land)
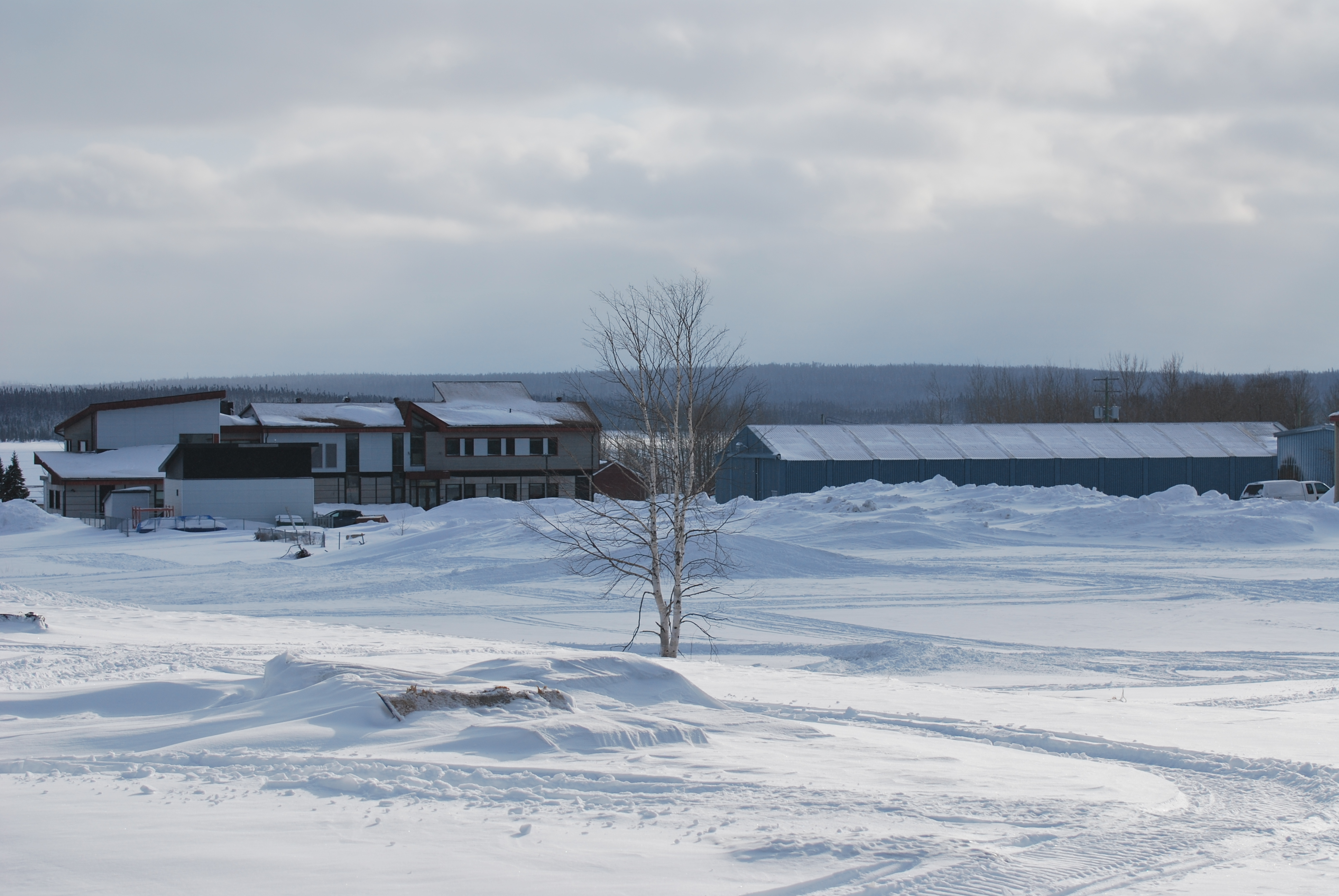
- Winter scene in Mistissini

- Mistissini
- Coordinates: 50°25′N 73°52′W
- Country: Canada
- Province: Quebec
- Region: Nord-du-Québec
- Territory: Eeyou Istchee

Area
  - Total: 852.05 km^{2} (328.98 sq mi)
  - Land: 807.75 km^{2} (311.87 sq mi)

Population
  - Total: 3,731
- Website: Mistissini.ca

Mistissini (Cree: ᒥᔅᑎᓯᓃ, romanized: Mistisinî meaning Big Rock) is a Cree town located in the south-east corner of the largest natural lake in Quebec, Lake Mistassini. The town is inside the boundaries of the Baie-James Municipality and is the second largest Cree community with a population of 3,731 people in 2021. The surface area of the town is 807.75 square kilometres (311.87 sq mi) (Category I land, as defined in the James Bay and Northern Quebec Agreement).

Mistissini is part of the Grand Council of the Crees (Eeyou Istchee) and the Cree Regional Authority. The Cree School Board and the Cree Construction Company have their head offices here.

The town is about 90 kilometres (56 mi) north-east from the town of Chibougamau, connected by a paved road. Mistissini has a fishing lodge with 20 rooms and a restaurant.

== History ==
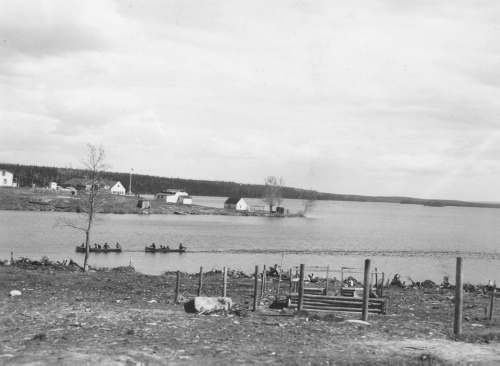
Logs in Lake Mistissini being dragged by two canoes at the current site of Mistissini (1947)

Cree have lived in the Rupert River watershed area and around Lake Mistassini for centuries. French explorers and traders entered the area in the 17th century and by the second half of that century, a trading post was established on Lake Mistassini. The location of the post shifted from time to time until 1821, when the Hudson's Bay Company established it at the present village site.

The trading post was supplied by canoe brigade from Rupert House (now Waskaganish) up the Rupert River or through Neoskweskau (a former Cree site) on the Eastmain River. The travel route shifted to the south - first through Oskelaneo when the railroad was built in 1910, and subsequently through the Lac Saint-Jean area. The road reached Mistissini in 1970.

Through time Mistissini and the various posts in the area were also known as "Maison Dorval", "Patagoosh", "Abatagoushe", "Mistassini", and "Baie-du-Poste".

== Education ==
The Cree School Board operates two schools in Mistissini: Voyageur Memorial Elementary School (VMES) and Voyageur Memorial High School (Cree: ᕛᔨᒐᕐ ᑳ ᐃᔥᐹᒡ ᒋᔅᑯᑕᒫᒉᐅᑲᒥᒄ). Voyageur Memorial School was built in 1983.
