= Wemindji =

Wemindji ᐐᒥᓂᒌ (Cree)
- Terre réservée crie (Cree reserved land)
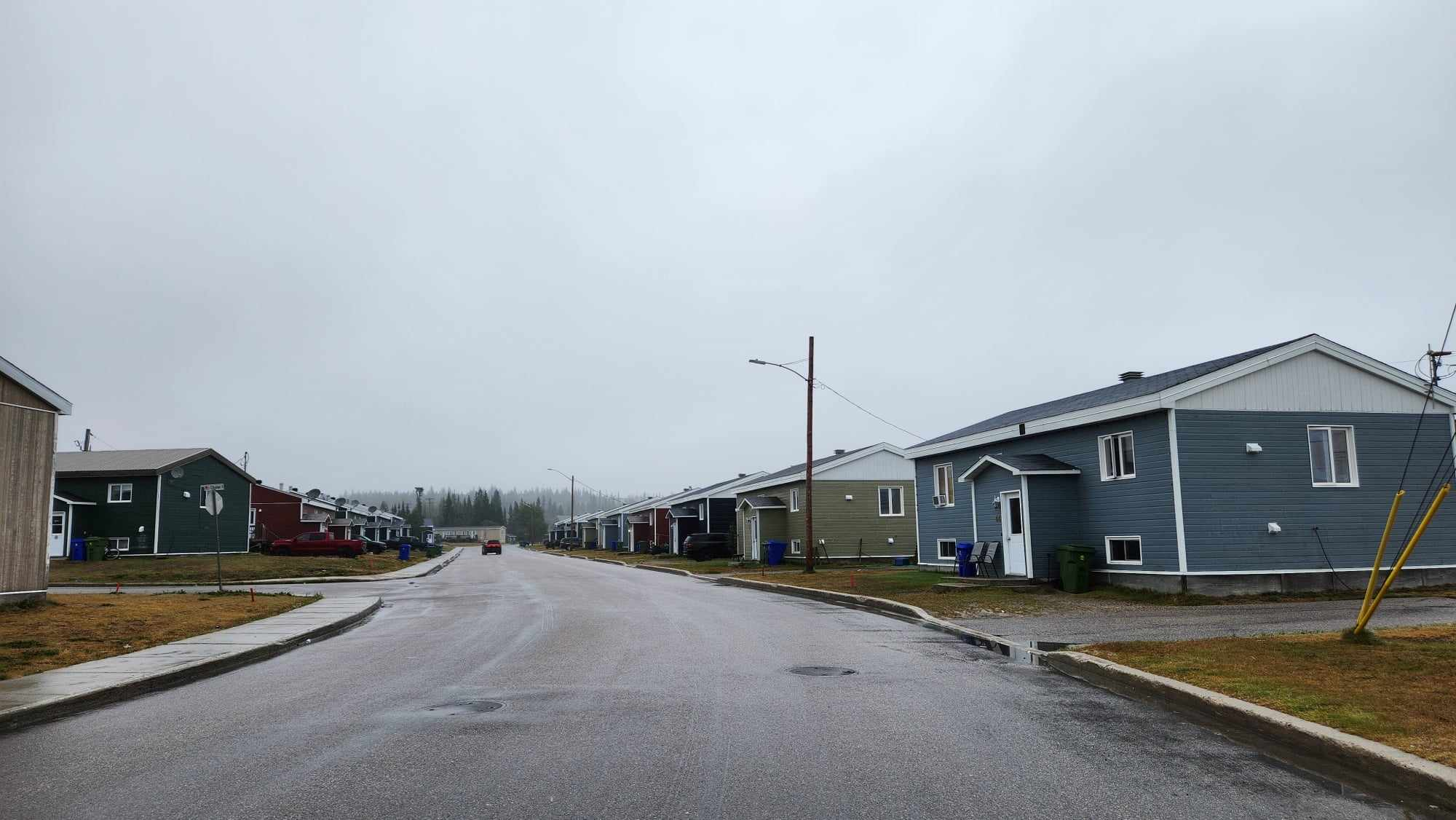

- Location within Quebec
- Coordinates: 53°00′10″N 78°48′37″W
- Country: Canada
- Province: Quebec
- Region: Northern Quebec
- TE: Eeyou Istchee

Government
  - Type: Cree reserved land
  - Chief: Christina Gilpin

Area
  - Land: 387.37 km^{2} (149.56 sq mi)

Population (2021)
  - Total: 1,562
  - Density: 4/km^{2} (10/sq mi)
- Time zone: UTC−5 (EST)
  - Summer (DST): UTC−4 (EDT)
- Postal Code: J0M 1R0
- Area code: 819
- Website: www.wemindji.ca

Wemindji (Cree: ᐐᒥᓂᒌ/Wîminicî) is a small Cree community on the east coast of James Bay at the mouth of the Maquatua River in Quebec, Canada. It is the seat of the Cree Nation of Wemindji. The community is located within the federal riding of Abitibi—Baie-James—Nunavik—Eeyou, currently represented in the House of Commons by Sylvie Bérubé of the Bloc Québécois. The community has a population of approximately 1,500 people. Around 1,600 are affiliated to the Cree Nation of Wemindji and around 200 do not reside on the territory of Wemindji.

The chief and council consists of the chief, deputy chief and five councillors. The chief and council are all elected by the beneficiaries of the Cree Nation of Wemindji. The current chief is Christina Gilpin, alongside Arden Visitor as deputy chief. The current councillors are Elmer Georgekish, Bradley A.J Georgekish, Paul John Murdoch, Stanley Shashweskum, and Ernest Tomatuk. The chief and council are elected every four years, the current chief and council was elected in September 2017.

Wemindji is accessible by air at Wemindji Airport and, since 1995, by car over a gravel road linking it to the James Bay Road. The nearest large city is Montreal which is about 1,400 kilometres south of Wemindji.

Although Wemindji is a fairly small community of about 3,266 hectares, it has variety of services and schools (an elementary and high school), clinic, wellness department, motels, bed and breakfast, mini mall (shopping centre), police station, two daycares, after school program (C.O.O.L.), tradition centres, sports facilities, fire station and more.

== History ==
Wemindji is a fairly new community comprising Cree families originally living at the trading post in Cree named "Paakumshumwashtikw", in French Vieux-Comptoir River, known as Vieux-Comptoir or its English equivalent "Old Factory". This trading post was founded in the 17th century and was alternately under British or French control. In 1959 the community was relocated about 45 km north to its present location (where Wemindji is now).

Wemindji (Cree for "red ochre mountain") gets its name from the red pigment found in the hills surrounding it. It has also been known in French as "Nouveau-Comptoir".

The Cree Nation of Wemindji is one of the nine communities under the James Bay and Northern Quebec Agreement signed on 1975 by the Cree, Inuit, Quebec government and federal government. The Cree went on an injunction to make an agreement on the project of hydro development because the Quebec government and hydro development failed to recognize the Cree's rights to their land.

In 1975, the [James Bay and Northern Quebec Agreement] between the Crown and the indigenous people in Canada was the first leading agreement since the numbered treaties of the 19th and early 20th centuries. From 1973 to 1975, this agreement was negotiated and on November 11, 1975, it was signed. As specified in the agreement, the Aboriginal people traded their rights and territorial interests for different rights and benefits. Special membership was insisted by the Aboriginal people to allow them to take charge in their local and regional government, The creation of their own health and school boards, measures for economic and community development, special regimes for police and justice and environmental protection.

The agreement allowed them to gain a technical definition of the La Grande Project which included limitations on water levels and a remedial works corporation for social, environmental damages, and relocation of the first dam. In the agreement, the land was divided into three categories. The first category of land is controlled mainly by the residents in and around the aboriginal communities. The second category known as crown land is used as hunting, fishing, and trapping territories shared between the Cree and Inuit. Lastly, the third category of land is used for traditional hunting and harvesting which was designated exclusively for Aboriginal people to use.

== Demographics ==
=== Languages ===
There are mainly two languages in Wemindji, which are Cree and English.

== Arts and culture ==
Cree have always identified themselves as iIyiyuuch which means "the people". The Cree have continued practising their traditional way of hunting, trapping and fishing. Parts of Wemindji's populations still lives off the land year round.

== Government ==
Wemindji is one of the nine Cree First Nations communities of the Cree Nation of Eeyou Istchee. The Cree Nation live on the land of Eeyou Istchee, which means people's land. The people call themselves “Eeyou”. Along with their 11 Cree communities, there are over 300 traditional family hunting and trapping grounds which they call “traplines”. Each of the Cree First Nations communities have their own different and individual history. Every community through their local government is administered independently, while Cree Nation issues are discussed by the elected chiefs on the board of directors of the Grand Council of the Cree and the Council of the Cree Nation Government.

== Infrastructure ==
The Cree Board of Health operates the clinic within the Cree Nation of Wemindji. The clinic provides services a variety of programs such as the awash (child) program, the uschinisuu (youth) program, chishayiuu (elder) program, Multi Service Day Centre (MSDC), Physiotherapy, Psycho-education, Nutritionist, Youth protection, Dental Services, Administration.

== Education ==
The Cree School Board is a regional entity that presents all nine Cree communities. In Wemindji, the Cree School Board operates the Maquatua Eeyou School (ᐧᒫᑯᐧᑖᐤ ᐄᔨᔨᐤ ᒋᔅᑯᑎᒫᑑᑭᒥᒄ)/ Joy Ottereyes Rainbow Memorial School. The Maquatua Eeyou School is a high school and the Joy Ottereyes Rainbow Memorial School is an elementary school. The high school and elementary school have an emphasis on teaching the Cree language. English is the second language within both of the institutions.

== See also ==
- Hudson's Bay Company
- Grand Council of the Crees
