= Eastmain =

Cree community located on the east coast of James Bay in Quebec, Canada

Eastmain ᐄᔅᒣᐃᓐ (Îsmein)
- Terre réservée crie (Cree reserved land)
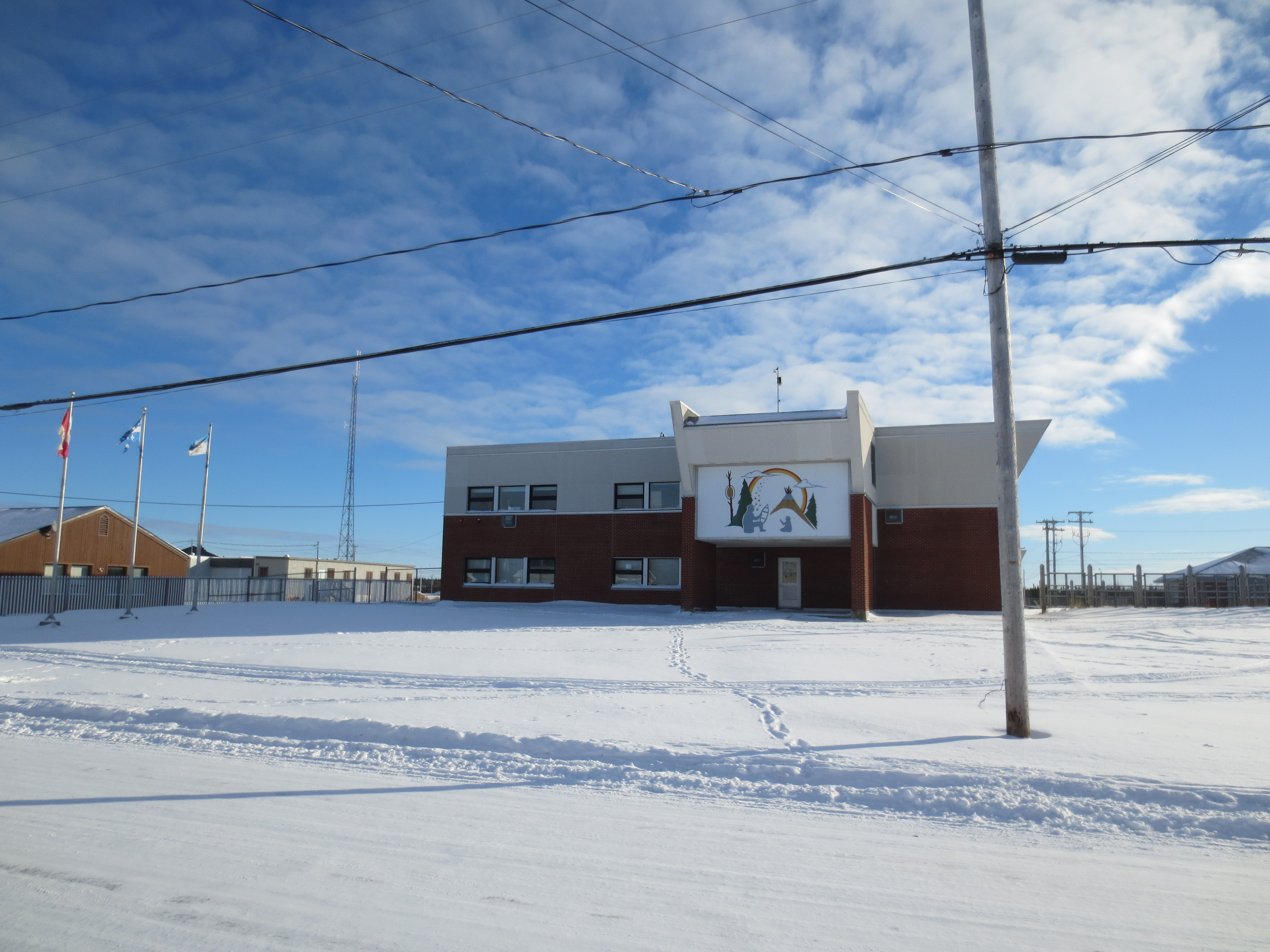
- Wabannutao Eeyou School
- Motto: Lasting Results. Strategies that deliver sustainable success
- Eastmain in the province of Quebec Eastmain (Canada)
- Coordinates: 52°15′N 78°30′W
- Country: Canada
- Province: Quebec
- Region: Nord-du-Québec
- Territory: Eeyou Istchee
- Formed: 1978

Government
  - Chief: Raymond Shanoush
  - Federal riding: Abitibi—Baie-James—Nunavik—Eeyou
  - Provincial riding: Ungava

Area
  - Total: 160.43 km^{2} (61.94 sq mi)
  - Land: 148.99 km^{2} (57.53 sq mi)

Population
  - Total: 924
- Time zone: UTC−05:00 (Within the AST legislated time zone boundary but observes EST)
  - Summer (DST): UTC−04:00 (EDT)
- Postal Code: J0M 1W0
- Area codes: 819 and 873
- Website: Eastmain.ca

Eastmain (Quebec French pronunciation: [iːstˈmẽɪ̯̃]; Cree: ᐄᔅᒣᐃᓐ/Îsmein) is a Cree community located on the east coast of James Bay at the mouth of the Eastmain River, Quebec, Canada. It is a small coastal Cree village with a population of 924 people in the 2021 Canadian Census up from 866 people at the 2016 Canadian Census. Its alternate Cree name is ᐙᐸᓅᑖᐤ/Wâpanûtâw, meaning Lands east of James Bay.

Eastmain is accessible by air (Eastmain River Airport) and by car over a gravel road linking it to the James Bay Road, which takes around 1 hour.

The Eastmain community was greatly affected by the James Bay Project, which in 1980 diverted 90% of the Eastmain River to the La Grande River.

== History ==
Like the other coastal villages on Hudson and James Bay, Eastmain was settled around a Hudson's Bay Company trading post, which was originally called East Main House. Some Cree settled there for ease in trading.

== Geography ==
=== Climate ===
Eastmain has a subarctic climate (Dfc), typical of communities along the eastern shore of the James Bay. Summers are mild and rainy, with mild days and cool nights. Winters are cold with extremely heavy annual snowfall, averaging 261.3 cm (102.9 in).

Climate data for La Grande Rivière Airport
Month	Jan	Feb	Mar	Apr	May	Jun	Jul	Aug	Sep	Oct	Nov	Dec	Year
Record high humidex	1.8	4.8	11.1	21.8	33.9	37.5	44.3	35.5	31.6	28.3	11.7	7.6	44.3
Record high °C (°F)	1.4 (34.5)	5.0 (41.0)	11.3 (52.3)	22.3 (72.1)	32.6 (90.7)	35.0 (95.0)	37.3 (99.1)	31.2 (88.2)	27.1 (80.8)	23.5 (74.3)	12.3 (54.1)	7.4 (45.3)	37.3 (99.1)
Mean daily maximum °C (°F)	−18.5 (−1.3)	−15.9 (3.4)	−8.2 (17.2)	0.6 (33.1)	10.3 (50.5)	17.3 (63.1)	20.4 (68.7)	18.6 (65.5)	12.3 (54.1)	4.8 (40.6)	−3.1 (26.4)	−12.0 (10.4)	2.2 (36.0)
Daily mean °C (°F)	−23.2 (−9.8)	−21.6 (−6.9)	−14.5 (5.9)	−5.0 (23.0)	4.3 (39.7)	10.8 (51.4)	14.2 (57.6)	13.1 (55.6)	8.1 (46.6)	1.7 (35.1)	−6.1 (21.0)	−16.0 (3.2)	−2.9 (26.8)
Mean daily minimum °C (°F)	−28.0 (−18.4)	−27.3 (−17.1)	−20.7 (−5.3)	−10.6 (12.9)	−1.6 (29.1)	4.2 (39.6)	8.0 (46.4)	7.6 (45.7)	3.8 (38.8)	−1.5 (29.3)	−9.1 (15.6)	−19.9 (−3.8)	−7.9 (17.8)
Record low °C (°F)	−40.9 (−41.6)	−44.6 (−48.3)	−39.7 (−39.5)	−31.4 (−24.5)	−14.4 (6.1)	−6.6 (20.1)	−0.9 (30.4)	−0.5 (31.1)	−7.0 (19.4)	−16.7 (1.9)	−29.2 (−20.6)	−40.3 (−40.5)	−44.6 (−48.3)
Record low wind chill	−56	−57	−51	−40	−24	−12	−3	−6	−10	−20	−40	−53	−57
Average precipitation mm (inches)	30.9 (1.22)	21.9 (0.86)	29.4 (1.16)	32.7 (1.29)	39.0 (1.54)	65.3 (2.57)	78.5 (3.09)	91.1 (3.59)	110.6 (4.35)	87.3 (3.44)	67.9 (2.67)	42.6 (1.68)	697.2 (27.45)
Average rainfall mm (inches)	0.1 (0.00)	1.2 (0.05)	3.4 (0.13)	12.7 (0.50)	27.9 (1.10)	62.6 (2.46)	78.5 (3.09)	91.0 (3.58)	106.9 (4.21)	56.2 (2.21)	11.6 (0.46)	1.7 (0.07)	453.8 (17.87)
Average snowfall cm (inches)	33.1 (13.0)	23.0 (9.1)	28.6 (11.3)	21.0 (8.3)	11.9 (4.7)	2.6 (1.0)	0.0 (0.0)	0.1 (0.0)	4.0 (1.6)	32.4 (12.8)	60.3 (23.7)	44.4 (17.5)	261.3 (102.9)
Average precipitation days (≥ 0.2 mm)	16.3	12.5	11.9	10.8	12.1	12.4	14.1	16.2	20.2	20.6	22.0	19.7	188.9
Average rainy days (≥ 0.2 mm)	0.3	0.7	1.1	4.0	8.0	11.6	14.0	16.3	19.5	12.7	4.1	0.8	92.9
Average snowy days (≥ 0.2 cm)	16.4	12.3	11.5	8.5	5.7	1.6	0.0	0.0	1.9	11.8	20.5	19.6	109.8
Average relative humidity (%) (at 06:00 / 15:00 LST)	71.8	71.4	74.0	78.5	78.2	78.4	84.3	88.2	90.8	89.9	88.4	80.6	81.2
Average afternoon relative humidity (%) (at 06:00 / 15:00 LST)	73.1	68.3	60.3	57.9	53.1	50.3	54.7	59.6	68.9	75.8	83.5	80.3	65.5
Source: Environment and Climate Change Canada

== Demographics ==
As of May 2022, the nation counted 943 members, of which 830 persons lived in the Community. there were 223 private dwellings that are occupied by usual residents, out of a total of 280. The mother tongue of the residents is:

- English as first language: 11.4%
- French as first language: 1.1%
- Cree as first language: 82.6%
- Other indigenous languages: 0.6%

Population trend:

- Population in 1981: 328
- Population in 1986: 356
- Population in 1991: 444
- Population in 1996: 527
- Population in 2001: 614
- Population in 2006: 650
- Population in 2011: 767
- Population in 2016: 866 (2011 to 2016 population change: 12.9%)
- Population in 2021: 924 (2016 to 2021 population change: 6.7%)

== Economy ==
With a population nearing 1000, the main economic activities of the community are its services sectors. This would include a restaurant within a hotel, private businesses, and a construction company with a gas station and garage. Eastmain is also the headquarters for the Cree Regional Trappers Association, whose role is to support all local Cree Trappers by maintaining the practices of their traditional activities. Other services include its emergency service departments, local radio station, post office, local school, government service sectors, sports and recreation complex, local development corporation, and local medical services, including a clinic.

== Education ==
The Cree School Board operates the Wabannutao Eeyou School (Cree: ᐧᐋᐸᓅᑖᐤ ᐄᔨᔫ ᒋᔅᑯᑕᒫᒉᐅᑲᒥᒄ).

== See also ==
- Grand Council of the Crees
