= Oujé-Bougoumou =

Oujé-Bougoumou ᐆᒉᐳᑯᒨ
- Terre réservée crie (Cree reserved land)
- Oujé-Bougoumou Cree Nation
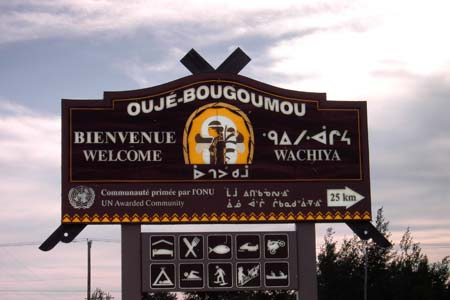

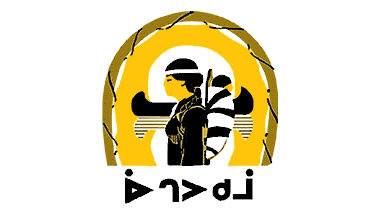
- Flag

- Location within Quebec
- Coordinates: 49°55′32″N 74°49′04″W
- Country: Canada
- Province: Quebec
- Region: Nord-du-Québec
- TE: Eeyou Istchee
- Founded: 1992

Government
  - Chief: Gaston Cooper
  - Federal riding: Abitibi—Baie-James—Nunavik—Eeyou
  - Prov. riding: Ungava
- Elevation: 372 m (1,220 ft)

Population (2021)
  - Total: 797
  - Change (2016–21): ▲6.7%
  - Dwellings: 277
- Time zone: UTC−5 (EST)
  - Summer (DST): UTC−4 (EDT)
- Postal Code: G0W 3C0
- Area codes: 418 and 581
- Website: www.ouje.ca

Oujé-Bougoumou (French pronunciation: [uʒe buɡumu]; Cree: ᐆᒉᐳᑯᒨ, romanized: ûchepukumû, lit. 'The place where people gather') is a Cree community, located on the shores of Opémisca Lake, in Eeyou Istchee, a territory equivalent to a regional county municipality, in Quebec, Canada.

Oujé-Bougoumou (referred to as "Oujé", or simply "OJ", by local residents) is accessible by a 25 km (16 mi) paved road (gravel before 2008), linking to Route 113 not far from Chapais. Along with the neighbouring towns of Chibougamau and Chapais, Oujé-Bougoumou is served by the Chibougamau/Chapais airport located approximately 42 km (26 mi) away on Route 113.

== History ==
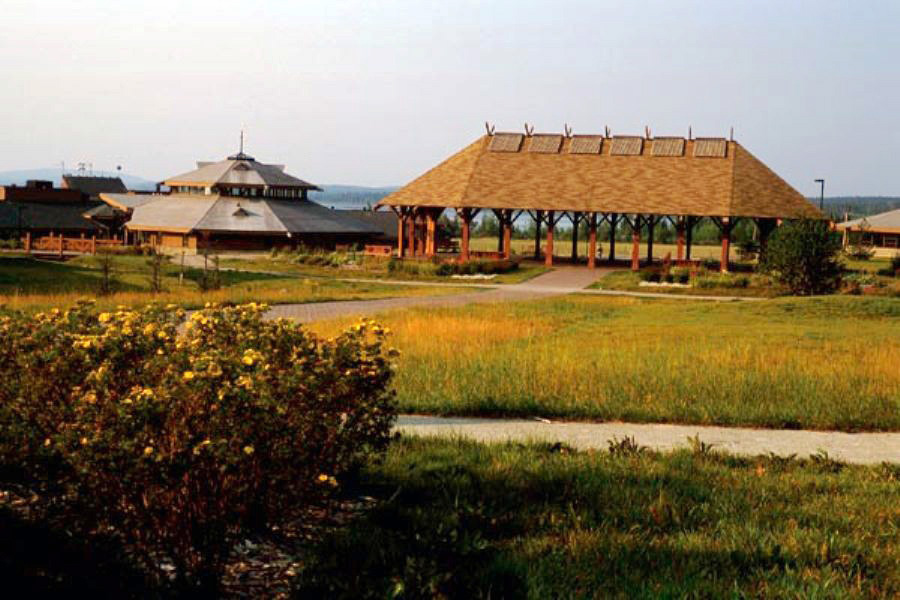
Village centre (right) and Pentecostal Church (left)

The Cree in the Chibougamau area had been marginalized in the 20th century by many forced relocations in order to accommodate the mining industry. After decades of such treatment, this band struggled to gain recognition from the government for their right to have a permanent village. It was designed by community members with the assistance of professional planners. The architectural theme was developed together with Douglas Cardinal (known for the Canadian Museum of History in Gatineau, Quebec) and was built in the early 1990s. It has won recognition and awards for its community development innovations, which attempted to take architectural expression, economic sustainability, and environmental conservation into account.

== Education and learning ==
The village has the Cree School Board English, French and Cree curricula, Waapihtiiwewan School (Cree: ᐧᐋᐱᐦᑏᐧᐁᐧᐊᓐ ᒋᔅᑯᑕᒫᒉᐅᑲᒥᒄ), operating in Oujé-Bougoumou. On September 21, 1993, the school, also designed by indigenous artist Douglas Cardinal, opened. Around 162 youths attend the village school, while other families may send their children to English or French schools in nearby Chibougamau.

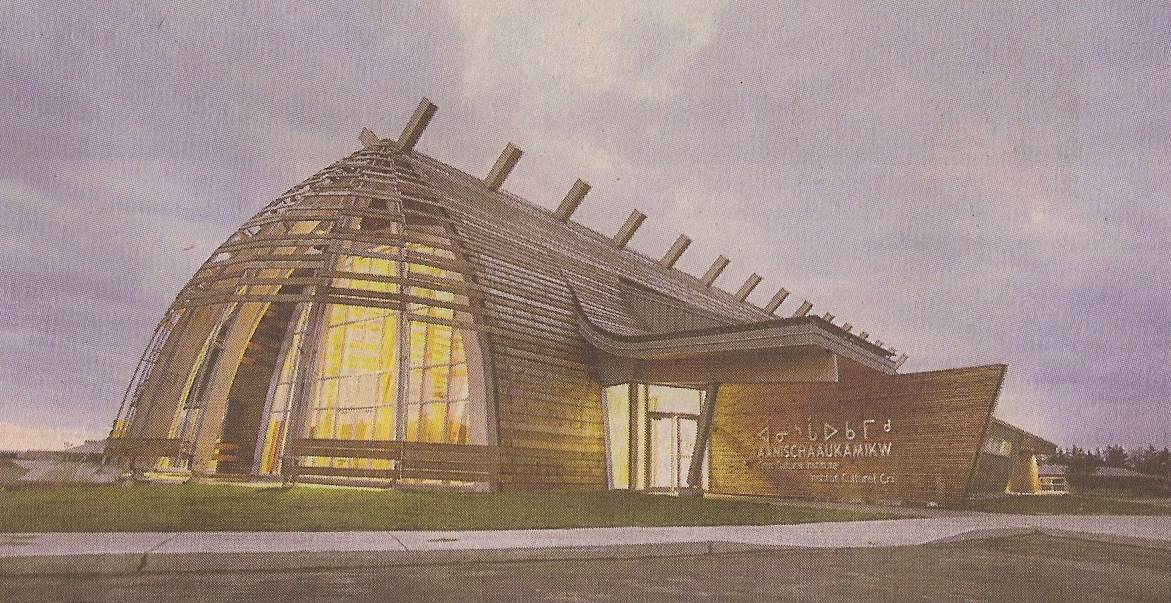
Aanischaaukamikw Cree Cultural Institute

Aanischaaukamikw Cree Cultural Institute opened on November 15, 2011, after 10 years of planning and construction, at a cost of $15 million. The name Aanischaaukamikw (ânischeukamikw in the southern dialect) is equivalent to "heritage centre" (âniscew-, meaning 'ancestry' and -kamikw, meaning 'dwelling') in English. It is a multi-purpose cultural institution for local cultural programs and will adapt and include programs currently provided by the James Bay Cree Cultural Education Centre and the Cree Regional Authority. It will also collaborate on the Cree-language research currently being conducted by the Cree School Board. The Cree community hopes to attract between 10,000 and 20,000 tourists each year. It stands on a semicircular lot in the middle of the village and was designed by Douglas Cardinal of Ottawa and Figurr Architects Collective (formerly Rubin & Rotman Architects) of Montreal. The inside of the building is open to the sky and has a number of features typical of Cree culture. It has become a major tourism destination in the region, with a mission to preserve Cree culture and tell visitors about Cree history, culture, and vision. Discussions are currently underway about hotel construction nearby as a way to continue this project and continue to promote Cree and northern culture.

== Leisure ==
In addition to the local Petaapin Youth Centre, there is the Albert Mianscum Memorial Sports Complex with a competition grade ice rink. Just outside the village is a motocross course that can be converted to a snocross course in the winter.

== Economy ==
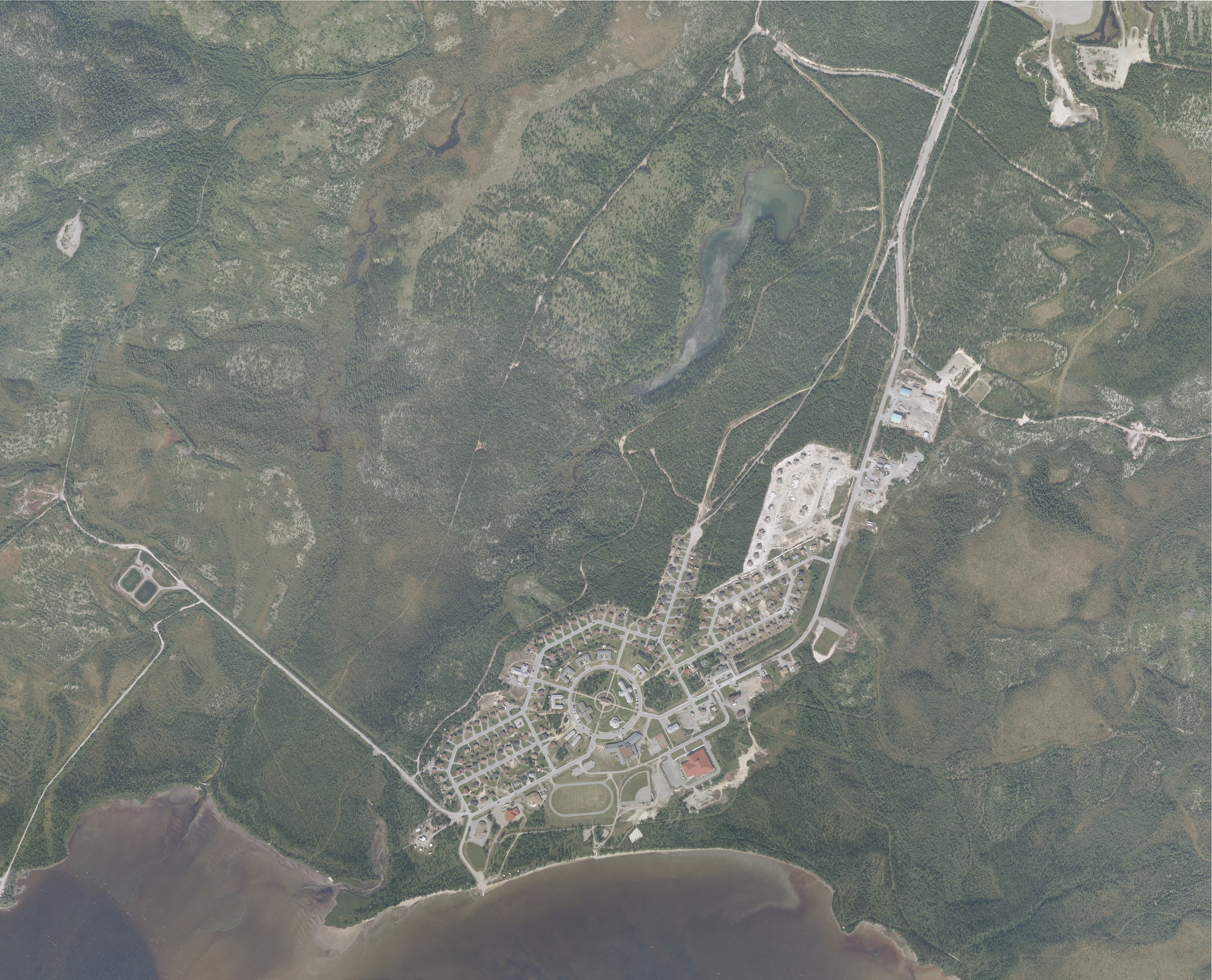
Aerial view.

The economy of Oujé-Bougoumou centres on operating and maintaining the village, mining exploration, trapping, tourism, construction, outfitting, and blueberry cultivation.

On November 9, 2009, under the Canadian Economic Action Plan, it was announced that a total of $3.2 million would be invested in the Aanischaaukamikw Cree Cultural Institute. The funding would come from the Department of Canadian Heritage, the Canada Economic Development Agency, and Indian and Northern Affairs Canada.

== Innovation ==
In designing their community, the Ouje-Bougoumou people decided to establish a community-wide district heating system fueled by wood waste from a nearby sawmill. Heat and domestic hot water for the village are generated in a central boiler house with two boilers. One has dual fuel capabilities and can burn wood or oil, while the second is for peak and standby purposes and runs on oil only.

The wood-fired boiler is fully automatic from fuel in-feed to ash removal. The system has a built-in telecommunications modem for remote troubleshooting and monitoring. The wood supply is a by-product from nearby sawmills that would otherwise be considered waste. If the wood supply runs short because of severe weather conditions, the boiler is run on oil.

From the boiler house, the heat is piped via an underground hot water distribution network with supply and return pipelines in a closed circuit. Each building is connected to the network via a customer heat transfer station that regulates and measures the energy taken from the distribution system. Each building is directly connected to the distribution system. From there, each building gets a supply of hot water and in cooler weather, heating.
