= School service centre =

The school service centre (French: centre de services scolaire) is the model of public French school self-governance, which replaced school boards in 2020, in the province of Québec (Canada), appointed by the Ministry of Education.

== Autonomy ==
Each one of the 60 centres is administered by a board of directors composed of five parents, five community members, and five staff members.

== History ==
The political party, Coalition Avenir Québec, passed Bill 40 on February 8, 2020. This expropriated the province's 60 French school boards, turning them into school service centres.

Bill 40 was passed to expropriate school boards that have been running in English style for 175 years. This did not include nine English school boards. But the move is seen as further undermining English-language education in the province. Bill 40 also does not affect the three Indigenous school boards under Canadian control in Quebec territory.

The abolishing of French school boards is said to save the government more than $10 million. Their reason for this is to try to improve the quality of education in Quebec.

=== French ===
The 60 Francophone school service centres are now to be run with five staff members, five parents and five members of the community.

=== English ===
On the other hand, English school board commissioners remain on the job until November 1, 2020, but they will then involve four staff members, four community representatives and between eight and seventeen parents.

The English school boards of Quebec invoked Article 23 of the Canadian Charter of Rights and Freedom, which is the official language minority education rights. They took legal action to get exempted from Bill 40.

== School service centres ==
- Centre de services scolaire de Montréal
- Centre de services scolaire Marguerite-Bourgeoys
- Centre de services scolaire de la Pointe-de-l'Île

== See also ==
- Ministry of Education
- Education in Quebec
