= Education in Ontario =

Education in the Canadian province

Educational oversight
- Minister of Education: Paul Calandra

National education budget (2024–2025)
- Budget: CA$35.4 billion

General details
- Primary languages: English, French
- System type: Regional school boards share power with provincial government.

Literacy
- Male: 99%
- Female: 99%
- Secondary: 645,945 (2022–2023)
- Post secondary: 920,145 (2021–2022)

Attainment
- Secondary diploma: 89%
- Post-secondary diploma: 64%

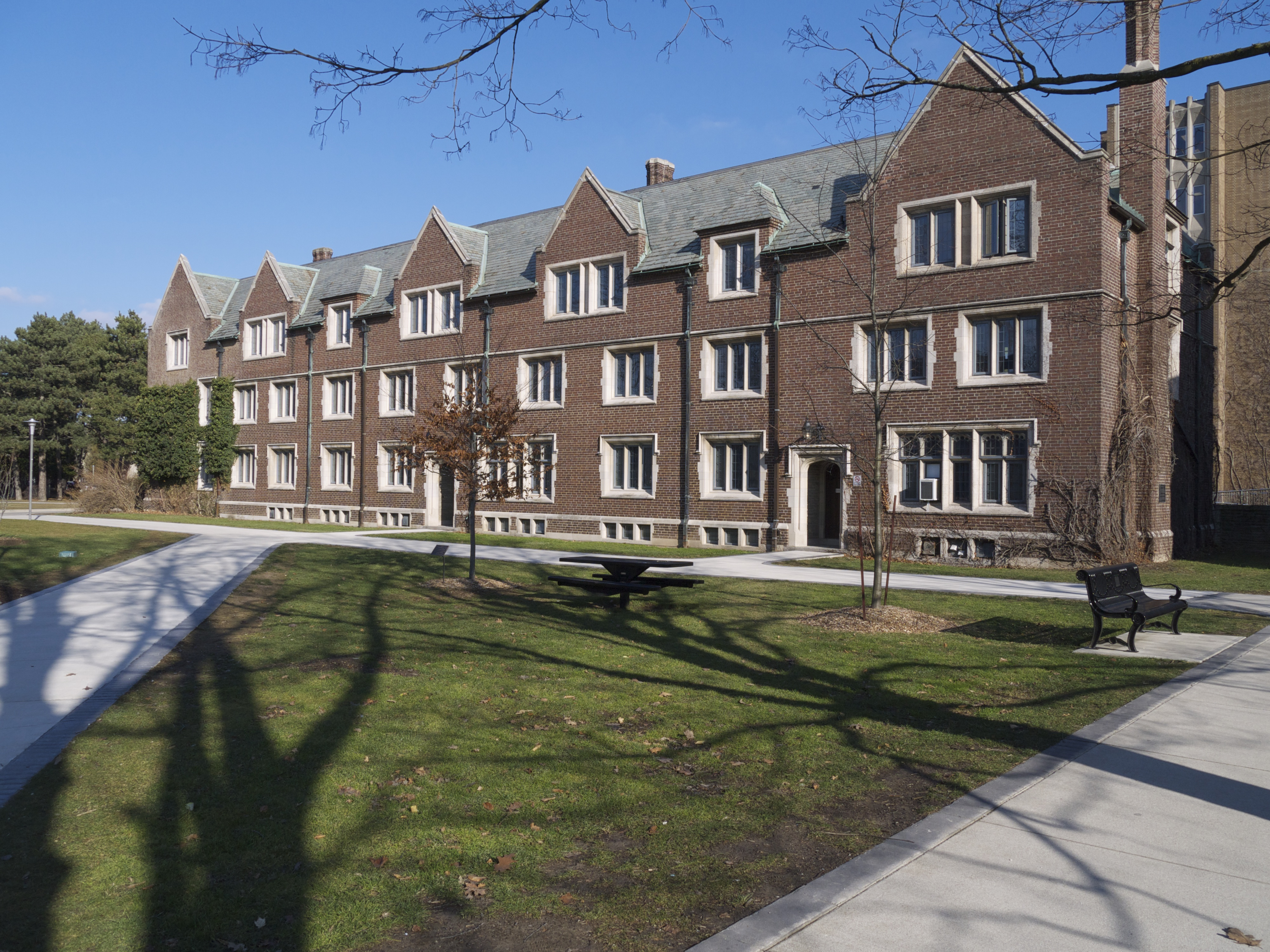

Education in Ontario comprises public and private elementary schools, secondary schools and post-secondary institutions. Publicly funded elementary and secondary schools are administered by the Ontario Ministry of Education, while colleges and universities are administered by the Ontario Ministry of Training, Colleges and Universities. The current respective Ministers for each are Jill Dunlop and Nolan Quinn. The province's public education system is primarily funded by the Government of Ontario, with education in Canada falling almost entirely under provincial jurisdiction. There is no federal government department or agency involved in the formation or analysis of policy regarding education for most Canadians. Schools for Indigenous peoples in Canada with Indian status are the only schools that are funded federally, and although the schools receive more money per individual student than certain provinces, the amount also includes the operation and maintenance of school facilities, instructional services, students supports and staff. Most provincial allocations per students do not include the maintenance and operation of buildings, as most provincial governments offer additional grants.

Several publicly funded school systems provide elementary and secondary schooling to Canadian residents of the province from junior kindergarten to grade 12. The school systems operate as public or separate, in either the English or French language. The overlapping publicly funded school systems is organized into a number of school boards: 31 English secular, 29 English Roman Catholic, eight French Catholic, four French secular, and one Protestant separate school board. French-language school boards are guaranteed under Section 23 of the Canadian Charter of Rights and Freedoms.

== History ==
=== Timeline ===
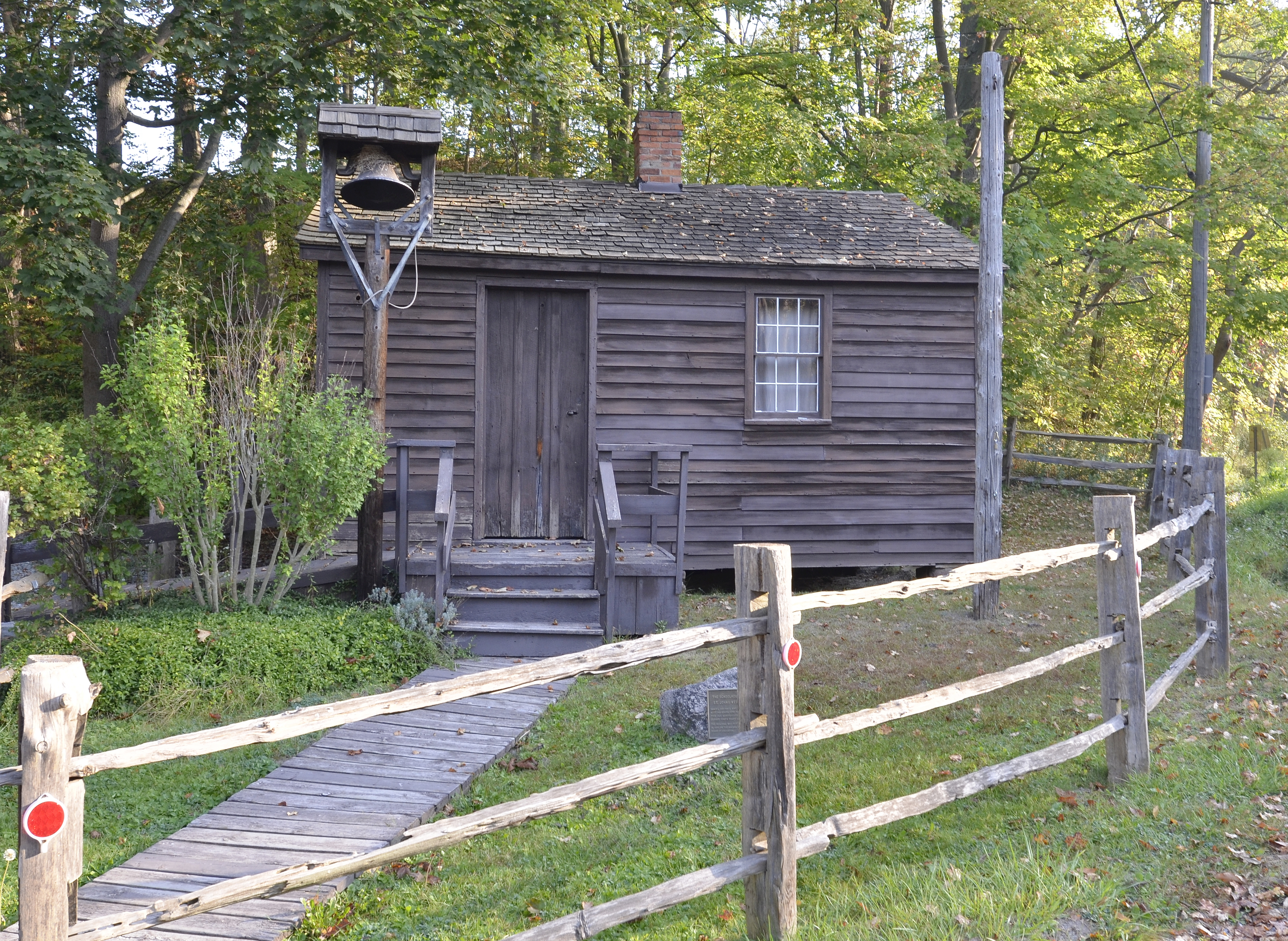
St. Johns Common School is the oldest extant public school in Ontario.

Upper Canada's Grammar School Act of 1807 provided the first public funds for schools in what would become Ontario. Eight schools were opened.

- 1804: St. Johns Common School in St. Johns was one of Ontario's first schools.
- 1816: The Act of 1816 authorized local trustees to decide on hiring criteria for teachers.
- 1823: A General Board of Education was established.
- 1824: The Legislature supported "moral and religious instruction of the more indigent and remote settlements" by granting the Board of Education a budget to create Sunday schools.
- 1824: The right to decide hiring criteria for teachers was transferred from trustees to the district Board.
- 1834: The Mohawk Institute Residential School, the oldest continuously operated residential school in Canada, opened on Six Nations of the Grand River near Brantford.
- 1841: With the union of Upper and Lower Canada into the Province of Canada, the position of general superintendent of education was created.
- 1843: With the realization that Canada West (formerly Upper Canada) and Canada East (formerly Lower Canada) had vastly different educational needs, the Act of 1841 was repealed. The Act of 1843 created the position of chief superintendent of education for Canada West (which would become the province of Ontario in 1867). Egerton Ryerson was chief superintendent from 1844 until his retirement in 1876.
- 1847: Chief Superintendent Egerton Ryerson returned from a tour of European education systems and submitted his "Report on a System of Public Elementary Instruction in Upper Canada". On the religious issue, he wrote that "religious differences and divisions should rather be healed than inflamed".
- 1847: Chief Superintendent Ryerson nominated School Section no. 2 in Thorold Township and School Section no. 4 in Stamford Township as the first non-rate paying schools in Upper Canada under the advice of District School Superintendent Dexter D’Everado.
- 1850: The Common School Act updated 1847 legislation creating school boards across Canada West. It required that municipalities meet the funding needs stated by their local school board, and allowed for schools to be paid for through provincial and municipal funds alone, allowing individual boards to eliminate school fees, but not making this compulsory. The Act also allowed for the creation of separate schools, leading to provincially funded Catholic schools and to racially segregated schools.
- 1870s: Girls were admitted on equal terms with boys, as education became compulsory for all children aged 7–12, but only for four months a year.
- 1871: The School Act made elementary education compulsory and free up to age 12. The Act also created two streams of secondary education: high schools, the lower stream; and collegiate institutes, the higher stream. Extra funding was provided for collegiate institutes "with a daily average attendance of sixty boys studying Latin and Greek under a minimum of four masters".
- 1876: The first Minister of Education was appointed, after Ryerson retired after 22 years as chief superintendent of education.
- 1891: The compulsory school-leaving age was raised to 14.
- 1900s: Education became compulsory to the age of 16. Secondary school become free. The use of slates in the classroom ended.
- 1921: The compulsory school-leaving age was raised to 16 in urban areas, with exemptions for students needed at home or already in the workplace.
- 1954: 16 became the compulsory school-leaving age for all students, with work exemptions.
- 1968: The Hall-Dennis Report was released, officially titled "Living and Learning".
- 1970: Exemptions for work were removed from school legislation. All students were required to attend school until age 16.
- 1984: Grade 13 was replaced by Ontario Academic Credit (OAC).
- 1997: Education funding moved to the provincial level.
- 2003: Secondary education became a four-year program, with the phasing out of Ontario Academic Credit.

=== Racially segregated schools ===
An amendment to the 1850 Common School Act allowed for the creation of racially segregated schools. This was because the Common School Act included the Separate School Clause, which allowed for the separation between different religions and races. However, it was taken advantage of and quickly became problematic as school trustees supported racial segregation towards non-White students. Racial segregation looked different depending on where it took place in Canada. Many of these schools were located in southwestern Ontario where Black individuals and families settled looking for freedom. Some schools in Ontario had separate school buildings, while others attended the same school but at different times. The schools for Black students were characterized by markedly poorer conditions and little concern was shown for their education. Scholars identify this as a suppressed history because it contradicts narratives of Ontario and Canada as places of justice and equality. However, this history includes a legacy of slavery in Canada that lasted for over 200 years, as well as acts of terror perpetuated by white Ontarians, such as burning the barns of Black families to the ground. The last racially segregated school in Ontario did not close until 1965.

=== Residential schools in Ontario ===
Residential schools in Ontario were part of the larger Canadian Indian residential school system which spanned the country. The Mohawk Institute Residential School in Brantford, Ontario was the oldest continually-operating residential school in Canada. Other residential schools also existed across the province. Egerton Ryerson was a key architect of the residential school system in Ontario. Residential schools were federally administered, meaning that the provincial government was not required to meet treaty obligations to Ontario First Nations for education. Reserve schools continue to be funded by the federal government today under a different funding model than provincially funded schools. The curriculum in Ontario now includes the culture of Indigenous people, and the topic of maltreatment of Indigenous people in residential schools.

== Primary and secondary education ==
Ontario operates four publicly funded school systems, with there being both English and French equivalents of the public school system and the Catholic school system. About half of Ontario's government-funded District School Boards are Catholic (37 out of 72). There are some publicly funded schools with non-Catholic religious affiliation: these include Eden High School (under the District School Board of Niagara) and the Burkevale Protestant Separate School (under the Penetanguishene Protestant Separate School Board). Legislation regarding primary and secondary level education in Ontario is outlined in the Education Act. As of 2021, two million children were enrolled as students within the province. Elementary schools teach children enrolled in kindergarten and grades 1–8, while secondary schools teach adolescents in grades 9–12. Four and five year olds may enter kindergarten programs but are not required by law to do so until they turn six that calendar year.

=== Separate school systems ===
In 1867, the Constitution of Canada outlined protections for educating both Protestant and Catholic students. As a result of legislative developments, only Ontario, Alberta, and Saskatchewan continue to keep these separate school systems; although Ontario is the only province that fully funds such schools. Public debate regarding whether to dissolve Catholic school funding has existed since the 1980s, as Catholic schools started receiving full public funding in 1985. Catholic individuals can choose whether to direct their property taxes to Catholic or public school boards.

In 1996, Adler v Ontario determined that provinces could choose how to direct their funding to religious schools. In 1999, the United Nations concluded that Ontario's funding of Catholic schools is a form of religious discrimination, as other religions do not receive such funding for their schools. Possible solutions presented by the United Nations for remedying the matter were either removing faith-based funded entirely or extending such funding to other religious schools. Non-Catholic teachers cannot apply for an estimated third of total available teaching jobs in the province, as being Catholic is a requirement to work for a Catholic school board. A 2018 Ipsos poll concluded that 60% were in favour of a single school system that was publicly funded. Proponents argue that defunding the Catholic school system would be more fair to people with different religious backgrounds and save an estimated $1.2 to $1.5 billion annually.

=== Secondary schools ===
High school students typically take four classes in a semester, unless the school has a multiple subject instructional period (MSIP), where students will take five classes instead. Students are streamed into either "applied" or "academic" tracks in grade 10. (Note: Before 2022, students were steamed in grade 9.) It is difficult for applied track students to switch to academic courses. Black and indigenous students are placed in applied streams more often in comparison to white students. Since streaming directly influences a student's options for postsecondary education, the practice has been criticized for discriminating against minority students. Some schools offer a Specialist High Skills Major (SHSM) where students can apprentice trades before graduating. An expanded program involving trades apprenticeship is planned for 2025.

The Ontario Secondary School Diploma (OSSD) has various requirements. High school students must complete 30 credits. 12 of these credits are mandatory courses, while the other 18 are electives chosen by the student. Additional academic requirements include a passing grade on the Ontario Secondary School Literacy Test and on the financial literacy test. 40 hours of volunteer service are also a graduation requirement. Individuals that do not graduate may enroll as 12B students, which allows for an extra year of schooling to graduate. 12B students might have already earned their OSSD and use the program for victory lapping. There is no legal age or time constraint against attending secondary school longer than four years, although a limit on course credits exists. Students who graduate with an 80% average earn an Ontario Scholar certificate. Before the discontinuation of the program in 2024, adult learners who had not earned their Ontario Secondary School Diploma could earn an equivalent certification through General Education Development (GED). There is no replacement program for GED.

=== French immersion ===
Some public schools offer a french immersion program. It is distinct from francophone education, as it is meant to immerse anglophone students in the language. French immersion programs were first introduced in Canada in the 1960s. Students enrolled in french immersion programs in Toronto are typically middle class and white. Entrance to these programs is limited and therefore competitive, as parents want their children to have better employment opportunities. Some schools offer it to parents on a first-come, first-served basis, while others perform a lottery. The program has been criticized as elitist and contributing to structural inequalities in Canada.

=== Private schools ===
Under the Education Act, private schools in Ontario are required to offer the Ontario curriculum or a program not of lesser educational value than it. It must also submit a notice of intention to legally operate within the province. A private institution is considered a school if "instruction is provided at any time between the hours of 9 a.m. and 4 p.m. on any school day for five or more pupils who are of or over compulsory school age in any of the subjects of the elementary or secondary school courses of study." Private schools that meet provincial standards may offer the Ontario Secondary School Diploma.

== Higher education ==
Higher education in Ontario includes postsecondary education and skills training regulated by the Ministry of Colleges and Universities, whose current minister is Jill Dunlop. Recognized institutions include universities, colleges of applied arts and technology, and private career colleges. While there is some overlap between the purpose of universities and colleges in Canada, they generally serve different purposes. Universities place greater emphasis on academics while colleges place greater emphasis on work-integrated learning. Both colleges and universities can offer undergraduate degree programs. There are also programs that involve a partnership between a college and a university. Some students choose to attend college over university because it is the more affordable option.

In 2021, international students represented a sixth of the total student population in Ontario. Both public and private postsecondary institutions have had dramatic spikes in their international student population in the past decade, as regulation prevents these inflated costs from being passed on to domestic students. In 2024, a federal cap on international student visas was introduced to ease the national housing crisis. Colleges in Ontario were impacted more heavily by this cap than universities. Conestoga College was the most impacted institution from the cap. In 2023, it had an intake of 30,000 international students, which was the highest of any institution in Canada; 450 of these students applied for asylum after being unable to afford their tuition.

For the 2025-2026 year, tuition fees for undergraduate university studies in Canada cost on average 7 734 CAD$ for Canadians and 41 756 CAD$ for international students. On a scale of from 1 to 11, ranging from least to most expensive, Ontario ranks 8th at an average of tuition of 8 958 CAD$ for Canadian students. Meanwhile, it is ranked the most expensive province for international students, with an average tuition of 49 802 CAD$.

== See also ==
- Education in Canada
- Education in Toronto
- Contact North – Government distance education program
- Education Quality and Accountability Office
- International Student Exchange, Ontario
- Ontario Secondary School Teachers' Federation
- Ontario Teachers' Federation
- Education in French in Ontario
