= Education in Canada =

Educational oversight
- Provincial & Territorial Ministers of Education: List of Ministers: AB: Demetrios Nicolaides; BC: Lisa Beare; MB: Tracy Schmidt; NB: Claire Johnson; NL: Krista Lynn Howell; NS: Becky Druhan; NWT: Caitlin Cleveland; NU: Pam Gross; ON: Paul Calandra; PEI: Rob Lantz; QC: Bernard Drainville; SK: Everett Hindley; YK: Jeanie McLean

National education budget (2016)
- Budget: 6.0% of GDP^{‡}

General details
- Primary languages: English, French
- System type: Provincially controlled

Literacy
- Male: 99%
- Female: 99%

Attainment
- Secondary diploma: 93%
- Post-secondary diploma: 68%
- ‡ Includes Elementary, secondary and post-secondary non-tertiary education.

Education in Canada is for the most part provided publicly, funded and overseen by federal, provincial, and local governments. Education is within provincial jurisdiction and the curriculum is overseen by the province. Education in Canada is generally divided into primary education, followed by secondary education and post-secondary. Education in both English and French is available in most places across Canada. Canada has a large number of universities, almost all of which are publicly funded. Established in 1663, Université Laval is the oldest post-secondary institution in Canada. The largest university is the University of Toronto with over 85,000 students. Four universities are regularly ranked among the top 100 world-wide, namely the University of Toronto, University of British Columbia, McGill University, and McMaster University, with a total of 18 universities ranked in the top 500 worldwide.

According to a 2022 report by the Organisation for Economic Co-operation and Development (OECD), Canada is the most educated country in the world; the country ranks first worldwide in the percentage of adults having tertiary education, with over 57 percent of Canadian adults having attained at least an undergraduate college or university degree. Canada spends an average of about 5.3 per cent of its GDP on education. The country invests heavily in tertiary education (more than US$20,000 per student). As of 2022, 89 per cent of adults aged 25 to 64 have earned the equivalent of a high-school degree, compared to an OECD average of 75 per cent.

The mandatory education age ranges between 5–7 to 16–18 years, contributing to an adult literacy rate of 99 per cent. Just over 60,000 children are homeschooled in the country as of 2016. The Programme for International Student Assessment indicates Canadian students perform well above the OECD average, particularly in mathematics, science, and reading, ranking the overall knowledge and skills of Canadian 15-year-olds as the sixth-best in the world, although these scores have been declining in recent years. Canada is a well-performing OECD country in reading literacy, mathematics, and science, with the average student scoring 523.7, compared with the OECD average of 493 in 2015.

== Timeline of introduction of compulsory education ==
- 1871: Ontario
- 1873: British Columbia
- 1877: Prince Edward Island
- 1883: Nova Scotia
- 1905: New Brunswick
- 1909: Saskatchewan
- 1910: Alberta
- 1916: Manitoba
- 1942: Newfoundland
- 1943: Quebec

=== Section 15(2) in Education ===
Section 15(2) of the Canadian Charter of Rights and Freedoms permits governments to implement programs aimed at improving the conditions of disadvantaged groups, even if these programs involve differential treatment based on race, gender, or other protected grounds.

==== Data Collection and Remedial Programs ====
Several school boards, including the Toronto District School Board (TDSB), have implemented identity-based data collection to assess achievement gaps among racialized students. These practices are designed to inform supports targeted toward specific demographic groups under the protection of Section 15(2).

Critics have raised concerns about the transparency and methodology of these data practices. In some cases, it is unclear whether white students are included as a comparison group or fully represented in calculations measuring educational harm. Currently, there is no federal or provincial legislation that explicitly governs the inclusion or exclusion of demographic groups in school board-level education data. This has led to public debate regarding the fairness and legal scope of equity-focused interventions.

== Assessment agencies ==
The Canadian Education Statistics Council (CESC) works in collaboration with provincial and territorial departments that are responsible for education and training, on the Pan-Canadian Education Indicators Program (PCEIP). The CESC includes both the Council of Ministers of Education, Canada (CMEC) and Statistics Canada. The CESC submits an annual report, Education Indicators in Canada: An International Perspective, "supports the comparison of educational systems in Canada's provinces and territories with member [OECD] countries".

The Organisation for Economic Co-operation and Development (OECD) coordinates the Programme for International Student Assessment (PISA) that is intended to evaluate educational systems—OECD members and non-OECD members—by measuring 15-year-old school pupils' scholastic performance on mathematics, science, and reading.

== Canada-wide ==
The federal government's responsibilities in education are limited to the Canadian Military Colleges, the Canadian Coast Guard College, and funding the education of Indigenous peoples; all other matters of education in Canada fall under provincial responsibility. As such, there is much variation in the management of education from province to province.

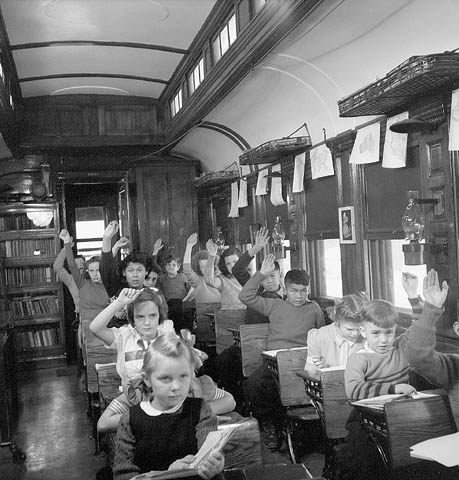
1950 Canadian School Train. Pupils attend classes at Nemegos near Chapleau, Ontario.

In 2016, 8.5% of men and 5.4% of women aged 25 to 34 had less than a secondary school diploma (340,000 young Canadians). In many places, publicly funded secondary school courses are offered to the adult population. The ratio of secondary school graduates versus non diploma-holders is changing rapidly, partly due to changes in the labour market that require people to have a secondary school diploma and, in many cases, a university degree. Nonetheless, in 2010, 51% of Canadians had completed a tertiary education, the highest rate in the world. The majority of schools, 67%, are co-educational.

Canada spends about 5.2% of its GDP on education in 2020. The country invests heavily in tertiary education (more than US$20,000 per student). Recent reports suggest tuition fee increases across all provinces ranging from a low of .3% in Ontario to a high of 5.7% in Alberta due to a province-wide restructuring of fees. Since the adoption of section 23 of the Constitution Act, 1982, education in both English and French has been available in most places across Canada (if the population of children speaking the minority language justifies it). French Second Language education/French Immersion is available to anglophone students across Canada. English Second Language education/English Immersion is also available in Quebec's French language schools.

According to an announcement of Canadian Minister of Citizenship and Immigration, Canada is introducing a new, fast-track system to let foreign students and graduates with Canadian work experience become permanent eligible residents in Canada.

Most schools have introduced one or more initiatives such as programs in Native studies, antiracism, Aboriginal cultures and crafts; visits by elders and other community members; and content in areas like indigenous languages, Aboriginal spirituality, indigenous knowledge of nature, and tours to indigenous heritage sites. Although these classes are offered, most appear to be limited by the area or region in which students reside. "The curriculum is designed to elicit development and quality of people's cognition through the guiding of accommodations of individuals to their natural environment and their changing social order"

Subjects that typically get assessed (i.e., language arts, mathematics, and science) assume greater importance than non-assessed subjects (i.e., music, visual arts, and physical education) or facets of the curriculum (i.e., reading and writing versus speaking and listening).

Some scholars view academics as a form of "soft power" helping to educate and to create positive attitudes, although there is criticism that educators are merely telling students what to think, instead of how to think for themselves, and using up a large proportion of classroom time in the process. Social promotion policies, grade inflation, lack of corrective feedback for students, teaching methods that slow the development of soft skills compared to past decades, reform mathematics, and the failure to objectively track student progress have also forced secondary schools and colleges to lower their academic standards.

According to a November 2011 Maclean's opinion piece, Alberta's education system provides better results compared to other provinces, partially because of Alberta's rigorous "provincial standardized exams". According to a 2011 study by the University of Saskatchewan, Albertans have higher grades in university due to the comprehensive education compared to other provinces. Grades are also notably boosted when applying for many universities in Canada to entice Albertan students to go to those universities, such as the University of British Columbia. This also explains why the University of Alberta is quite competitive when applying with an out-of-province education.

=== Divisions by religion and language ===
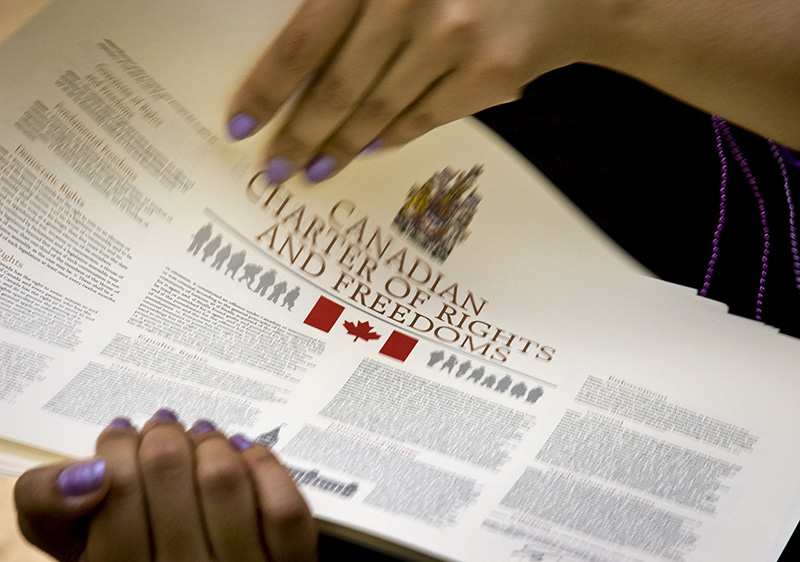
The Canadian Charter of Rights and Freedoms includes provisions that guarantee English and French first language schools, and reaffirms the pre-existing right of separate schools where applicable.

The Constitution of Canada provides constitutional protections for some types of publicly funded religious-based and language-based school systems.

Section 93 of the Constitution Act, 1867 contains a guarantee for publicly funded religious-based separate schools, provided the separate schools were established by law prior to the province joining Confederation. Court cases have established that this provision did not apply to Nova Scotia, New Brunswick, Manitoba, British Columbia, and Prince Edward Island, since those provinces did not provide a legal guarantee for separate schools prior to Confederation. The provision did originally apply to Ontario, Quebec, Saskatchewan, Alberta, and Newfoundland and Labrador, since these provinces did have pre-existing separate schools. This constitutional provision was repealed for Quebec by a constitutional amendment in 1997, and for Newfoundland and Labrador in 1998. The constitutional provision continues to apply to Ontario, Saskatchewan, and Alberta. There is a similar federal statutory provision that applies to the Northwest Territories. The issue of separate schools is also addressed in Section 29 of the Canadian Charter of Rights and Freedoms, which reaffirms the rights of separate schools found in the Constitution Act, 1867.

Section 23(1)(b) of the Canadian Charter of Rights and Freedoms guarantees the right of citizens who were educated in the minority language in a particular province to have their children educated in the minority language in publicly funded schools. In practice, this guarantee means that there are publicly funded English schools in Quebec, and publicly funded French schools in the other provinces and the territories.

Quebec students must attend a French school up until the end of secondary school unless one of their parents qualifies as a rights-holder under s. 23(1)(b) of the Charter. In Ontario, French-language schools automatically admit students recognized under section 23 of the Canadian Charter of Rights and Freedoms and may admit non-francophone students through the board's admissions committee consisting of the school principal, a school superintendent, and a teacher.

An example of how schools can be divided by language and religion is visible in Toronto, which has four public school boards operating in the city. They include two English first language school boards, the separate Toronto Catholic District School Board and secular Toronto District School Board; and two French boards, the separate Conseil scolaire catholique MonAvenir and secular Conseil scolaire Viamonde.

=== Length of study ===
As education is a provincial matter, the length of study varies depending on the province, although the majority of public early childhood, elementary, and secondary education programs in Canada begin in kindergarten (age five typically by 31 December of that school year) and end after Grade 12 (age 17 by 31 December). After completion of a secondary school diploma, students may go on to post-secondary studies.

Exceptions to the aforementioned length of study include the provinces of Nova Scotia, Ontario, and Quebec, as well as the Northwest Territories. As opposed to the other provinces, the Kindergarten programs in the Northwest Territories, Nova Scotia, Ontario, and Quebec consist of two years, with the first year open to students age four by 31 December. Ontario established its Junior Kindergarten program in the early 1940s. In 2016, the Government of Nova Scotia announced an expansion of its Pre-Primary program to be made available throughout the province by 2020. Implementation of Junior Kindergarten began in the Northwest Territories during the 2017–18 school year, an expansion of an earlier pilot project in several smaller communities in the territory. In 2019, the Government of Quebec announced the creation of kindergarten classes for four-year-olds in the province's elementary schools. The length of study at the secondary level also differs in Quebec, with the final grade of secondary schools in the province being Grade 11/Secondaire V.

Conversely, in Ontario, a student may choose to lengthen their period of study in a secondary school for an additional number of years, colloquially referred to as a victory lap. From 1989 to 2003, secondary education in Ontario formally included a fifth year (intended for students preparing for post-secondary education), known as the Ontario Academic Credit (age 18 by 31 December). Prior to 1989 Ontario secondary schools included Grade 13 (leading to the Secondary School Honours Graduation Diploma). Although OAC was phased out in 2003, a study in 2010 published by academics with Lakehead University noted that the province was only partially successful in its efforts, with a significant minority of students opting to take a fifth year. Approximately 14 per cent of students in Ontario opted to take a fifth year as late as 2012. In September 2013, the Government of Ontario introduced a 34-credit threshold (30 credits is required for the Ontario Secondary School Diploma) (Note: Exemptions to the credit threshold exists, which includes students with special education needs.) in an effort to limit the length of study for its secondary school students and reduce the financial burden from students returning for a fifth year. A "resident pupil" of Ontario has the right to attend a public secondary school until they've received their 34th-course credit, attended the school for seven years, or are age 20 and have not been in a school in the last four years, after which the secondary school reserves the right to refuse further admission to the student.

While the period of study in Canada begins as early as four years old, the age where a child's attendance becomes mandatory varies among the provinces and territories, ranging from ages five to seven. Children who turn five by 31 December are required to begin schooling in British Columbia, New Brunswick, Nova Scotia, and Yukon; although parents are able to apply for a deferment. In Alberta, Newfoundland and Labrador, the Northwest Territories, Ontario, Prince Edward Island, and Quebec, a child is required to attend school at the age of six. Manitoba and Saskatchewan are the only provinces where the minimum compulsory attendance age is seven. Attendance in school is compulsory up to the age of 16 in all provinces except Manitoba, New Brunswick, and Ontario, where attendance is compulsory until the student turns 18, or as soon as a secondary school diploma has been achieved.

=== Authorities ===
Normally, for each type of publicly funded school (such as Public English or Public French), the province is divided into districts (or divisions). For each district, board members (trustees) are elected only by its supporters within the district (voters receive a ballot for just one of the boards in their area). Normally, all publicly funded schools are under the authority of their local district school board. These school boards would follow a common curriculum set up by the province the board resides in. Only Alberta allows public charter schools, which are independent of any district board. Instead, they each have their own board, which reports directly to the province.

== Primary and secondary education ==
Primary, intermediate, and secondary education combined are sometimes referred to as K–12 (Kindergarten through Grade 12). Secondary schooling, known as high school, collegiate institute, école secondaire or secondary school, consists of different grades depending on the province in which one resides. Furthermore, grade structure may vary within a province or even within a school division; as to whether or not they operate middle or junior high schools.

Kindergarten programs are available for children in all provinces in Canada and are typically offered as one-year programs for students who turn five in that year. However, the provinces of Nova Scotia, the Northwest Territories, Ontario, and Quebec operate two-year kindergarten programs, with the first year beginning at the age of four. The names of these programs, provincial funding, and the number of hours provided varies. For example, the Department of Education in Nova Scotia refers to Kindergarten as Grade Primary. Full-day kindergarten programs are offered in all provinces except Alberta, Manitoba, Nunavut, Saskatchewan, and Yukon. Students in the Prairie provinces are not required by statute to attend kindergarten. As a result, kindergarten often is not available in smaller towns.

Since the 1940s, Ontario's kindergarten program has consisted of two years: junior kindergarten for four–five-year-olds and senior kindergarten for five–six-year-olds. At Francophone schools in Ontario, these programs are called Maternelle and Jardin. In 2017, Nova Scotia began to implement a kindergarten program (pre-primary, starting at age four), with provincial-wide service available since 2020. In 2017, the Northwest Territories introduced its junior kindergarten program throughout the territory. Quebec offers subsidized preschool programs and introduced an early kindergarten program for children from low-income families in 2013.

Grade 12 presently serves as the final grade in all provincial secondary curriculums, except Quebec, whose secondary schools ends after Secondary V/Grade 11 (age 16 by September 30, Quebec cut off date is earlier); after which students who wish to pursue further studies may attend a post-secondary institution. Quebec is currently the only province where it treats Grade 12 as a part of the tertiary level of education. Grade 11 also served as the end of secondary education in Newfoundland and Labrador, until the province implemented Grade 12 in 1983. Conversely, from 1921 to 2003, Ontario's secondary curriculum lasted a year longer, with secondary schooling ending after Grade 13/Ontario Academic Credit (OAC). Grade 13 was reformed into OAC in 1988, and was offered in secondary schools until 2003, after which the grade was discontinued. A number of Canadian secondary schools offer the International Baccalaureate Program (IB) and Advanced Placement (AP) program. These courses prepare students for first-year university learning and can be used to replace or supplement existing courses in the curriculum. Many universities and colleges across North America offer advanced credits to students who excel in International Baccalaureate and Advanced Placement courses.

Students may continue to receive publicly funded secondary schooling until the ages of 19 to 21 (the cut-off age for secondary school varies between provinces). Depending on the province, those who are the age of majority may continue to attend a standard secondary school, or may be required to attend an adult high school.

Students of secondary school age who have received long-term suspensions or have been expelled, or are otherwise unable or unwilling to attend conventional schools may be offered alternative learning options to complete their secondary education, such as drop-in programs, night school, or distance/online classes. An increasing number of international students are attending pre-tertiary courses at Canadian secondary schools.

== Tertiary education ==
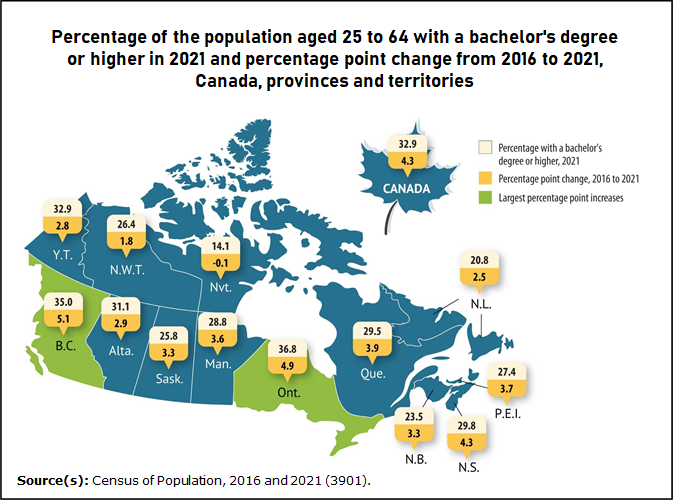
Canada by province and territory, showing the percentage of the population aged 25 to 64 who had a bachelor's degree or higher, and the percentage point change from 2016 to 2021

Post-secondary education in Canada is provided by universities (research universities, undergraduate universities, and university colleges) and vocational institutions (vocational colleges, career colleges, community colleges, institutes of technology or science, colleges of applied arts or applied technology, and in Quebec, collèges d’enseignement général et professionnel). Universities offer bachelor's, master's, professional, and doctoral degrees as well as post-graduate certificates and diplomas while vocational institutions issue diplomas, associate degrees, certificates, and apprenticeships. Vocational institutions offer career-focused training that is often practical where these institutions train their graduates to work as semi-professionals in various fields such as the skilled trades and technical careers and for workers in support roles in professions such as engineering, information technology, accountancy, business administration, health care, architecture, and law. University colleges and vocational institutions also offer degree programs where a student can take courses and receive credit that can be transferred to a university.

Nearly all post-secondary institutions in Canada have the authority to confer academic credentials (i.e., diplomas or degrees). Generally speaking, universities confer degrees (e.g., bachelor's, master's, professional or doctorate degrees) while colleges, which typically offer vocationally oriented programs, confer diplomas, associate degrees, and certificates. However, some colleges offer applied arts degrees that lead to or are equivalent to degrees from a university. Private career colleges are overseen by legislative acts for each province. For example, in British Columbia training providers will be registered and accredited with the (PCTIA) Private Career Training Institutions Agency regulated under the Private Career Training Institutions Act (SBC 2003). Each province has its own equivalent agency. Unlike the United States, there is no "accreditation body" that oversees the universities in Canada. Universities in Canada have degree-granting authority via an Act or Ministerial Consent from the Ministry of Education of the particular province. Tertiary and post-secondary education in Canada is also the responsibility of the individual provinces and territories. Those governments provide the majority of funding to their public post-secondary institutions, with the remainder of funding coming from tuition fees, the federal government, and research grants. Compared to other countries in the past, Canada has had the highest tertiary school enrolment as a percentage of their graduating population.

=== University ===
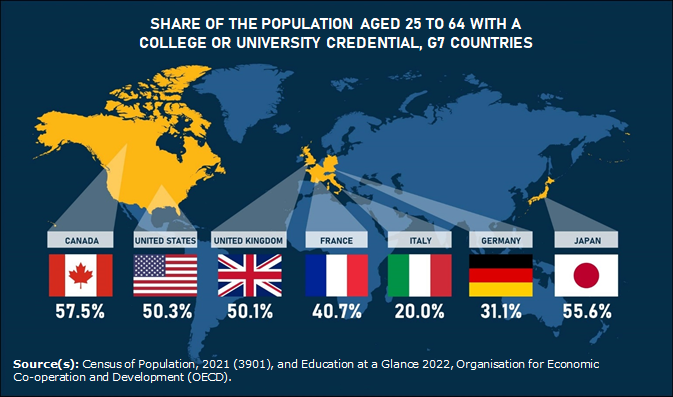
Largest share of college or university graduates in the G7

The traditional path to Canadian higher education is typically through university, as it is by far the most prestigious form of higher education in the country. There is no universally prescribed set definition to what constitutes a "university" in Canada as they come in various forms that serve the different educational needs of various Canadians. Each province has its own legislative meaning of the term but universities do intersect in terms of the types of degrees that they offer, research, competitiveness, location, and global institutional reputation. Canadian universities require students' senior secondary school transcript along with an application for admission. Admissions criteria to a university in Canada involve the grades earned in core senior secondary school courses taken, and an admission GPA based on their senior secondary school courses calculated in the form of a percentage. Applications for admission outline additional academic and extra-curricular achievements that cannot be expressed through a student's secondary school transcript. In the case of more prestigious and selective university programs, an essay, statement of intent, or personal statement of experience must be submitted directly to the university. In addition, letters of reference, examples of extracurricular activities, volunteering and community service endeavors, athletic participation, student awards, and scholarships are also required for acceptance to some of Canada's most prestigious university programs.

Generally, Canadian universities base admission with great weight emphasized around a student's academic performance in core senior secondary school courses taken during their grade 11 and 12 years as a measure of academic rigor in addition to assessing a prospective students capability to challenge themselves as predictors of future academic performance at the university level. In addition, most universities in Canada also denote a standardized GPA or an admission average cutoff. This admissions cut off is established based on the competitiveness of applicants applying to individual programs offered at specific universities. A typical competitive program at an esteemed Canadian university could have an admissions cutoff of 90 per cent or higher, while mid-tier universities have programs that maintain cut-offs around 80 per cent. Lower tier and lesser-known Canadian universities with more liberal application processes could have admission cut offs as low as 65 to 70 per cent.

Among the country's most prominent institutions are research universities that are domestically and internationally ranked such as the University of Toronto, McGill University, and the University of British Columbia. Other types of universities across Canada include denomination universities (e.g., Redeemer University College), undergraduate universities (e.g., Acadia University, MacEwan University, Mount Saint Vincent University, St. Francis Xavier University, University of Winnipeg, Wilfrid Laurier University), liberal arts colleges (e.g., University of Lethbridge, Bishop's University, Mount Allison University, Nipissing University, St. Thomas University, Trinity Western University), art schools (Alberta University of the Arts, Emily Carr University of Art and Design, LaSalle College Vancouver, Nova Scotia College of Art and Design, Ontario College of Art and Design, Vancouver College of Art and Design), online universities with distance education (Athabasca University, University of Fredericton), and military schools (Royal Military College of Canada, which is the military academy of the Canadian Forces, a full degree-granting university, and the only federal institution in Canada with degree-granting powers) as well as institutions that serve people in more rural and remote parts of the country such as Brandon University, Royal Roads University, Thompson Rivers University, the University of Northern British Columbia, University of Prince Edward Island, University of the Fraser Valley, and Vancouver Island University.

The quality of universities in Canada is internationally recognized and is home to some of the top universities in the world making it a global leader in scientific and technological research and adducing the delivery of higher education to promising Canadian students and prospective international students around the world. Canadian universities have placed in several international post-secondary rankings, with the Academic Ranking of World Universities including 30 Canadian universities in its 2025 rankings, QS World University Rankings and the Times Higher Education World University Rankings including 31 Canadian universities in their 2023 rankings, and the U.S. News & World Report Best Global University Ranking including 39 Canadian universities in its 2023 rankings.

=== Vocational ===
Vocational education in Canada is delivered through vocational colleges, career colleges, community colleges, institutes of technology or science, technical schools, colleges of applied arts or applied technology, and in Quebec through collèges d’enseignement général et professionnel. Though it is cheaper in terms of tuition, less competitive to get into, and not as prestigious as going to a four-year university, vocational schools adduce another post-secondary option for students seeking to enter higher education. Admissions to vocational schools in Canada have requirements that are less stringent than a university and vary more significantly but, unlike universities, qualifications and entrance standards into vocational institutions are more lax as they do not delineate admission cut-offs so as long as students meet the minimum average requirements and possess the prerequisite courses, they can gain admission to most vocational institutions across the country. Many vocational institutes such as George Brown College and Mohawk College accept a very high proportion of students with averages above 70 per cent, although they may place no limiting minimum for acceptance, and consequently take students with averages below 60 per cent.

The typical Canadian vocational institute is analogous to that of an American junior college or community college where they offer specialized vocational oriented certifications in an area of training. However, there are some institutions in Canada that offer both vocational training as well as a limited number of 4-year undergraduate university degrees such as Seneca College, Sheridan College, Centennial College of Applied Arts and Technology, Kwantlen Polytechnic University, Vancouver Island University, and Thompson Rivers University. There are over 200 community colleges in Canada. They are often found in remote and rural parts of the country.

Post-secondary vocational institutions in Canada offer apprenticeships, certificates, diplomas, and associate degrees. These are programs that offer specialized vocational education in specific employment fields related to the skilled trades and technical careers which generally last two years. In studying at a vocational school, a student can take the necessary courses needed to earn a certification that will allow for entry into jobs (such as becoming a beautician, licensed practical nurse, drafter, web developer, computer network support specialist, paralegal, medical laboratory technician, cardiovascular technologist, optician, or diagnostic medical sonographer, healthcare assistant etc.) requiring some level of tertiary education but not a full four-year university degree. After graduating from a vocational institution, some students continue their education by transferring to a university to complete a bachelor's degree, while others choose to enter the workforce. Apprenticeships are another form of post-secondary vocational education training in Canada, as students combine in-class instruction of theoretical principles with practical workforce training for careers related to the skilled trades. In addition, a series of exams have to be passed before the student is certified as a journeyperson. Skilled trades programs in Canada typically take four years to complete and, once the final level is successfully finished, the person is conferred a trades certificate and can become eligible to work anywhere in the country, provided they pass a series of tests known as the Red Seal exams.

== Private schools ==
About 6% of Canadian grade ten students are in private schools, most of which are in Quebec. A Statistics Canada study from 2015 found that these students tend to have higher test scores and future educational attainment than their public school counterparts. Rather than enjoying superior resources and educational practices, the most likely explanation for this discrepancy is the higher expectation of success that students experience from their parents, teachers, and fellow students.

=== Private universities ===
In the past, private universities in Canada maintained a religious history or foundation. However, since 1999, the Province of New Brunswick passed the Degree Granting Act allowing private universities to operate in the Province. The University of Fredericton is the newest university to receive designation in New Brunswick.

Trinity Western University, in Langley British Columbia, was founded in 1962 as a junior college and received full accreditation in 1985. In 2002, British Columbia's Quest University became the first privately funded liberal arts university without a denominational affiliation (although it is not the first private liberal arts university). Many provinces, including Ontario and Alberta, have passed legislation allowing private degree-granting institutions (not necessarily universities) to operate there.

Many Canadians remain polarized on the issue of permitting private universities into the Canadian market. On the one hand, Canada's top universities find it difficult to compete with the private American powerhouses because of funding, but, on the other hand, the fact that the price of private universities tends to exclude those who cannot pay that much for their education could prevent a significant portion of Canada's population from being able to attend these schools.

In addition to the issue of access, some Canadians take issue with protections instituted within the Charter of Rights and Freedoms as ruled by the Supreme Court of Canada in 2001 and consistent with federal and provincial law that (private) faith-based universities in Canada based on the long-established principles of freedom of conscience and religion can exempt themselves from more recent human rights legislation when they insist in their "community covenant" code signed by staff, faculty and students that they act in accordance with the faith of the school. The covenant may require restraint from those acts considered in contradiction with the tenets of their faith such as homosexual relationships, sex outside marriage or more broadly abstain from consuming alcohol on campus or viewing pornography. However, private-Christian based schools do not preclude homosexual or lesbian students from attending. Some faith-based universities have been known to fire staff and faculty which refused to adhere or whose actions were in opposition with the tenets of the faith, although in some provinces, their dismissals have been successfully challenged in court based on the circumstances.

=== Religious schools ===
Each province deals differently with private religious schools. In Ontario, the Catholic system continues to be fully publicly funded while other faiths are not. Ontario has several private Islamic, Christian and Jewish schools all funded through tuition fees. Since the Catholic schools system is entrenched in the constitution, the Supreme Court has ruled that this system is constitutional. However, the United Nations Human Rights Committee has ruled that Ontario's system is discriminatory, suggesting that Ontario either fund no faith-based schools, or all of them. In 2002 the government of Mike Harris introduced a controversial program to partially fund all private schools, but this was criticized for undermining the public education system and the program was eliminated after the Liberals won the 2003 provincial election.

In other provinces, privately operated religious schools are funded. In British Columbia the government pays independent schools that meet rigorous provincial standards up to 50% of the per-student operating cost of public schools. The province has a number of Sikh, Hindu, Christian, and Islamic schools. Alberta also has a network of charter schools, which are fully funded schools offering distinct approaches to education within the public school system. Alberta charter schools are not private and the province does not grant charters to religious schools. These schools have to follow the provincial curriculum and meet all standards but are given considerable freedom in other areas. In all other provinces, private religious schools receive some funding, but not as much as the public system.

== Levels in education ==
As the education system in Canada is managed by the varying provincial governments in Canada, the way the educational stages are grouped and named may differ from each region, or even between districts and individual schools. The ages are the age of the students when they end the school year in June.

- Early childhood education
  - CPE Pre-school (French: Garderie or Jardin), Pre-Kindergarten, Pre-Primary or Junior Kindergarten (JK, ages 3–5; average age 4) (Nova Scotia and Ontario)
  - Grade Primary, Senior Kindergarten or Kindergarten (French: Maternelle) (SK, ages 4–6; average age 5)
- Elementary education
  - Grade 1 (ages 5–7; average age 6), they start in the calendar year when they turn 6 (For example, someone born in July would be the average and be 6 all of grade 1, while someone born in December will be 5 when they start grade 1 and turn 6 during grade 1 and be one of the youngest while someone born in January will start grade 1 at age 6 and turn 7 during grade 1 and be one of the oldest.)
  - Grade 2 (ages 6–8; average age 7),
  - Grade 3 (ages 7–9; average age 8)
  - Grade 4 (ages 8–10; average age 9)
  - Grade 5 (ages 9–11; average age 10 )
  - Grade 6 (ages 10–12; average age 11)
- Intermediate education
  - Grade 7 (ages 11–13; average age 12) (Secondary School starts here in Quebec)
  - Grade 8 (ages 12–14; average age 13) (in some parts of B.C. high school starts in Grade 8)
  - Grade 9 (ages 13–15; average age 14)
- Secondary education
  - Grade 10 (ages 14–16; average age 15)
  - Grade 11 (ages 15–17; average age 16) (Secondary education in Quebec stops here)
  - Grade 12 (ages 16–18; average age 17) (Note: In Ontario, a student may take up additional years of secondary education, commonly known as a victory lap. A "resident pupil" of Ontario may attend a public secondary school until they've received their 34th course credit, or have attended the institution for seven years, after which, the school reserves the right to refuse further admission. "Victory lappers" are typically grouped as a part of the Grade 12 student population, and make up an average of 4% of all students enrolled in Ontario secondary schools each year.)
- Tertiary education
  - College: In Canada, the term college usually refers to a community college or a technical, applied arts, or applied science school. These are post-secondary institutions granting certificates, diplomas and, in some cases, bachelor's degrees. In Quebec, a diploma is also required from a college (CEGEP) to attend university and take the following forms:
    - Pre-university program, two years (typically Social Sciences, Natural Sciences, or Arts)
    - Professional program, three years (e.g. Paralegal, Dental Hygienist, Nursing, etc.)
  - University: A university is an institution of higher education and research, which grants academic degrees in a variety of subjects. A university provides undergraduate (bachelor's degree) and graduate (master's and doctoral degrees) education.
  - Graduate (or postgraduate)
    - One or two years leading to a master's degree.
    - Three or more years leading to a doctoral degree.

=== Grade structure by province ===
The following table shows how grades are organized in various provinces. Often, there will be exceptions within each province, both with terminology for groups, and which grades apply to each group.

Alberta (source)		Elementary							Junior High			Senior High				
Alberta (source)		Kindergarten	1	2	3	4	5	6	7	8	9	10	11	12		
British Columbia (source)		Primary				Intermediate						Secondary				
British Columbia (source)		Kindergarten	1	2	3	4	5	6	7	8	9	10	11	12		
Manitoba		Early Years					Middle Years				Senior Years					
Manitoba		Kindergarten	1	2	3	4	5	6	7	8	9	10	11	12		
New Brunswick (source)		Elementary						Middle School			High School					
New Brunswick (source)		Kindergarten	1	2	3	4	5	6	7	8	9	10	11	12		
Newfoundland and Labrador (source)			Primary			Elementary			Junior High			Senior High				
Newfoundland and Labrador (source)		Kindergarten	1	2	3	4	5	6	7	8	9	Level I (10)	Level II (11)	Level III (12)		
Northwest Territories (source) (source)	Elementary								Junior High			Senior High				
Northwest Territories (source) (source)	Junior Kindergarten	Kindergarten	1	2	3	4	5	6	7	8	9	10	11	12		
Nova Scotia (source)	Elementary								Junior High			Senior High				
Nova Scotia (source)	Pre-Primary	Primary	1	2	3	4	5	6	7	8	9	10	11	12		
Ontario	Elementary										Secondary					
Ontario	Junior Kindergarten / Maternelle	Senior Kindergarten / Jardin	1	2	3	4	5	6	7	8	9	10	11	12		
(Prince Edward Island) PEI (source)			Elementary						Intermediate School			Senior High				
(Prince Edward Island) PEI (source)		Kindergarten	1	2	3	4	5	6	7	8	9	10	11	12		
Quebec			Primary School						Secondary School					College		
Quebec	Garderie/Pre-Maternelle	Maternelle	1	2	3	4	5	6	7 (Sec I)	8 (Sec II)	9 (Sec III)	10 (Sec IV)	11 (Sec V)	first	second	third
Saskatchewan (source)		Elementary Level									Secondary Level					
Saskatchewan (source)		Kindergarten	1	2	3	4	5	6	7	8	9	10	11	12		
Yukon (source)		Elementary								Junior Secondary			Senior Secondary			
Yukon (source)		Kindergarten	1	2	3	4	5	6	7	8	9	10	11	12		

Notes:

- In British Columbia some schools may group together the higher Elementary and lower Secondary Grades. These schools are referred to as Middle Schools or Jr. Secondary Schools. Some Elementary Schools consist solely of grades K–5. Likewise, some Secondary Schools may only have grades 11 and 12. In addition, some school districts including Vancouver may use just elementary (K–7) and secondary (8–12) schools. British Columbia informally subcategorizes the Elementary level into "Primary" (K–3) and "Intermediate" (4–6 or 7).
- In Ontario, Grade 13 (equivalent to 1st year university with Ontario Universities, was in place. It ended in 2003. Then, Grade 13 was deleted and moved to 1st year (paid) University in the educational system.
- In Ontario, the terms used in French schooling consist of Maternelle in regard to Junior Kindergarten and Jardin in regard to Kindergarten. This differs from Quebec's Maternelle, which is the equivalent of Ontario's Kindergarten.
- In Manitoba, grade 9 to grade 12 was for a short time referred to as Senior 1 to Senior 4.
- In Newfoundland and Labrador, Level IV is used to collect missed grades that prevented a student from getting their graduation.
- In Nova Scotia the terms for groups, and grades they apply to varies significantly throughout the province. A common, but not universal, organization is shown.
- In Quebec college is two or three years, depending on what a student selects, based usually on what their post-secondary plans are. College in Quebec overlaps what other provinces consider the boundary between secondary education (high school) and post-secondary education (college and university). E.g. "Sec I" = "Secondary Year One" = "Grade 7"
- In Yellowknife, Northwest Territories, schools are now set up as elementary schools with grades K-5, middle schools with grades 6–8, and high schools with grades 9–12; however, high school graduation requirements only include courses taken in grades 10–12.
- In Saskatchewan Elementary school is most often from K–8 and high school from 9–12. High school graduation requirements only taken grades 10–12 and require 24 credits to graduate.

== Provincial and territorial departments and ministries ==
- Education in Alberta
- Education in British Columbia
- Education in Manitoba
- Education in New Brunswick
- Education in Newfoundland and Labrador
- Education in Northwest Territories
- Education in Nova Scotia
- Education in Nunavut
- Education in Ontario
- Education in Prince Edward Island
- Education in Quebec
- Education in Saskatchewan
- Education in Yukon

== See also ==
- Academic grading in Canada
- Canadian Language Benchmarks
- Higher education in Canada
- Homeschooling in Canada
- Indigenous education in Canada
- International students in Canada
- List of Canada-accredited schools abroad
- List of colleges in Canada
- List of school districts in Canada
- List of universities in Canada
- Lists of schools in Canada
- Open educational resources in Canada
- Band-operated schools
