= Vancouver Independent School for Science and Technology =

Vancouver Independent School for Science and Technology (Vancouver, BC)
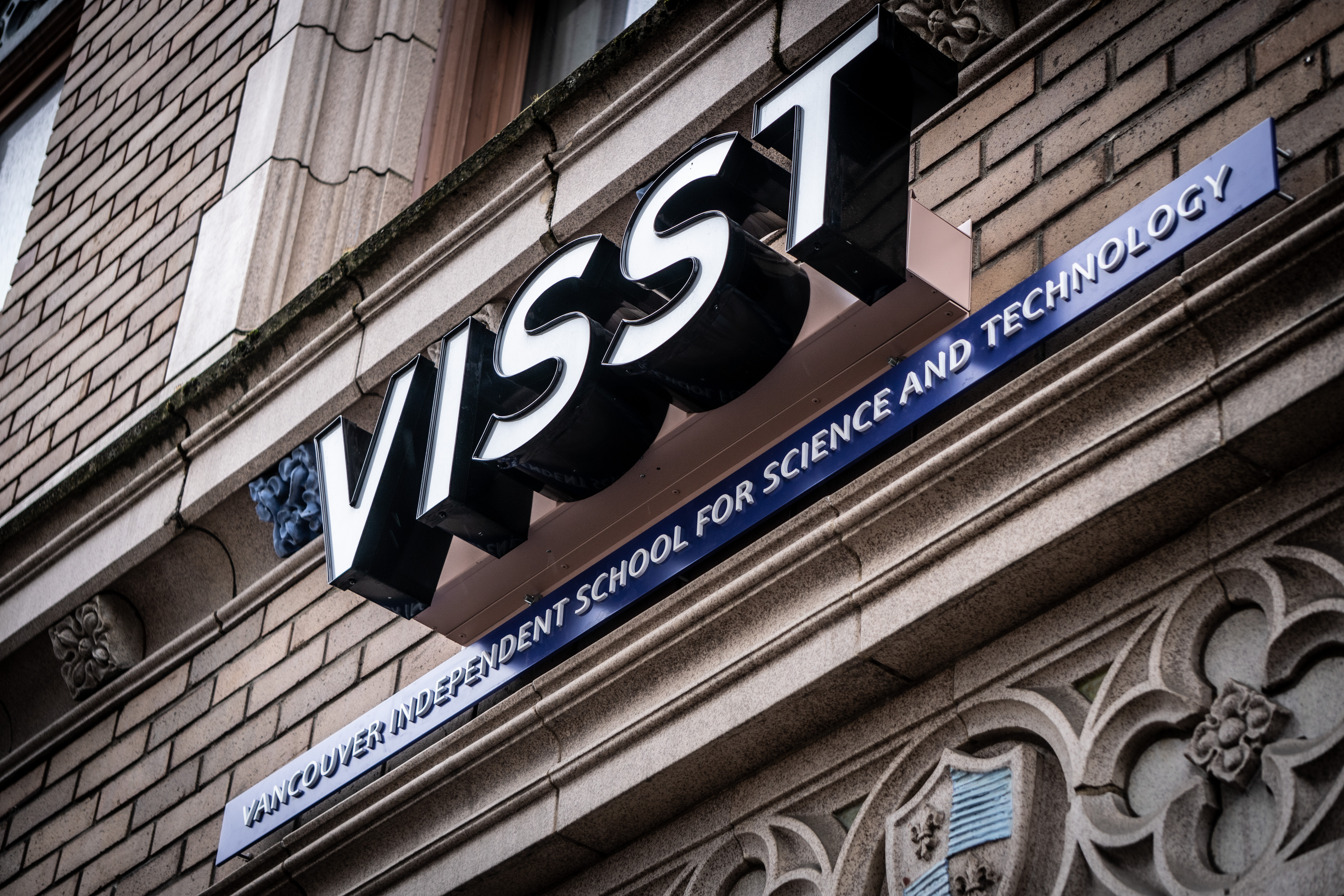

Location
- 1490 West Broadway; Vancouver, British Columbia, V6H 4E8; Canada; 49°15′48.27″N 123°8′17.31″W49°15′45″N 123°9′6″W

Information
- Grades: 8 - 12
- Language: English
- Website: www.visst.ca

Vancouver Independent School for Science and Technology (VISST) is a charity and not-for-profit independent school with a STEM focus. It is located in the Fairview neighbourhood of Vancouver, British Columbia.

== History ==
VISST was established as Vancouver's "only dedicated STEM high school" in 2022 by co-founders Mike Gelbart and Shaun Olafson.

== Mission ==
In addition to its STEM focus, VISST lists access and diversity as values of the school. It applies a sliding scale tuition model and endeavours to keep a balanced gender ratio at the school.

== Curriculum ==
VISST is an accredited high school under the Ministry of Education and Childcare, and delivers the full B.C. Curriculum, but accelerates and enriches STEM subjects, with emphasis on rigour, character, and project-based learning.
