= Lists of school districts =

A school district is an administrative and regulatory body responsible for the management of education institutions within the territorial limit under its jurisdiction. Jurisdictions which organize education into school districts include most of the United States, Canada, Italy, Hong Kong, and Iran. Lists of these districts include:

- List of school districts in Canada
- Lists of school districts in the United States
