= Lists of schools in Canada =

These are lists of schools in Canada:

== By province or territory ==
- List of senior high schools in Alberta
- List of schools in Manitoba
- List of schools in New Brunswick
- List of schools in the Northwest Territories
- List of schools in Nova Scotia
- List of schools in Nunavut
- List of high schools in Ontario
- List of schools in Prince Edward Island
- List of schools in Quebec
  - List of art schools in Quebec
- List of schools in Yukon

== By region ==
- List of Waterloo Region, Ontario schools (educational institutions)
- List of high schools in Windsor and Essex County, Ontario
- List of English-language educational institutions in Quebec
- List of Canada-accredited schools abroad

== By city ==
- List of schools in Greater Moncton
- List of schools in London, Ontario
- List of schools in Oakville, Ontario
- List of schools in Ottawa (educational institutions)
  - List of schools of the Ottawa Catholic School Board (English Catholic schools)
  - List of schools of the Ottawa-Carleton District School Board (English public schools)
  - List of schools of the Conseil des écoles catholiques du Centre-Est (French Catholic schools)
  - List of schools of the Conseil des écoles publiques de l'Est de l'Ontario (French public schools)
- List of schools in Regina, Saskatchewan
- List of educational institutions in Toronto
- List of schools in Winnipeg, Manitoba

== Other ==
- List of school districts in Canada
- List of Toronto District School Board elementary schools
- List of secondary schools in the Toronto District School Board
