= ISE =

ISE may refer to:

== Organizations ==
- International Society of Electrochemistry, a global scientific society founded in 1949
- Islamic Society of Engineers, principlist political organization of engineers in Iran

=== Education ===
- Iceland School of Energy, a school jointly owned by Reykjavik Energy, Reykjavik University, and Iceland GeoSurvey
- Institute for Shipboard Education, administrator of the Semester at Sea study-abroad program
- Institute for Social Ecology, an educational institution in Plainfield, Vermont
- International School Eindhoven, an international school in the northern part of Eindhoven, Netherlands
- International Student Exchange, Ontario, a non-profit organization allowing students to participate in reciprocal student exchange programs

=== Stock exchanges ===
- International Securities Exchange, a United States stock exchange
- Irish Stock Exchange, Ireland's main stock exchange
- Islamabad Stock Exchange, now Pakistan Stock Exchange
- Istanbul Stock Exchange, a former Turkish stock exchange that merged and became Borsa Istanbul

== Other ==
- Fraunhofer Institute for Solar Energy Systems (Fraunhofer ISE), an institute of the Fraunhofer Society
- Information Sharing Environment, a United States government program
- Initiative for Science in Europe, an independent platform of European learned societies and scientific organisations
- ISE Corporation, a company that developed hybrid electric drivetrains for heavy-duty transportation
- Ion selective electrode, a transducer that converts the activity of a specific ion dissolved in a solution into an electrical potential
- Xilinx ISE, software for synthesis and analysis of hardware description language designs
- Integrated Scripting Environment (Windows PowerShell)

== See also ==
- Ise (disambiguation)
