= Postgraduate year =

Education after high school before college

A postgraduate (PG) year is an extra year of secondary coursework at a boarding school following high school graduation, but before entering college. It is a gap year option intended for students who either have not applied or were not admitted to college. At most schools, postgraduate students are integrated with the senior class, where they are able to participate in the same activities and sports, as well as living and eating arrangements, as the seniors.

In the United States, most of the programs are in New England. They started around the 1960s and were sponsored by the U.S. military academies, who would accept students after the one-year program. Later programs were not all military-based, but followed the same theme of improving students' transcripts for college. Students also gained maturity and independence. Some athletes opt for a postgraduate year for the opportunity to physically grow and improve their skills to enter NCAA Division I sports programs. They also have the opportunity to be surrounded by other top prospects. Some college coaches use it as an alternative to redshirting, allowing the player to grow and improve without losing a year of college eligibility. Some prep leagues do not allow postgraduates on the team, or they have a quota.

== See also ==
- Reclassification (education), graduating a year later to develop physically and academically
- Super senior
