= Super senior =

Excessive student attendance

A super-senior is a student in a four-year educational institution (such as a high school or undergraduate school) who has more than four years in attendance or a surplus of credits required for a diploma and has not yet graduated. In certain cases these students are also known as postgraduates or fifth-year seniors. The term is informal, and sometimes derogatory by implying students are intentionally prolonging their studies or are not serious about progressing in their studies. However, super seniors may also exist due to hardship, disability, leaves of absence for illness or obligations, or demanding classes.

== Causes ==
Applied to education in the United States, super-seniors usually have the minimum number of credits to graduate but do not choose to for various reasons. These students will advance through the grades (freshman, sophomore, junior, senior) on schedule and are classified as a "senior" for two or more years.

=== Redshirt student-athlete ===
A student-athlete may have been made a redshirt their freshman year, which delays their four-year eligibility for competition in the NCAA until their sophomore year. As a result, they will still be eligible the year after their senior year and may stay in college to continue competition.

=== Multiple degrees ===
Students who intend to complete two or more degrees at the same time are often required to earn approximately 140–150 credits to receive their degrees, rather than the normal 120. It is often in the student's best interest to earn all desired/required undergraduate degrees at the same time as financial aid is more readily available to undergraduates than to graduates returning for additional undergraduate degrees. They could also use summer school sessions as well.

=== Change of majors ===
Students may choose to change majors after they are well advanced in their schooling. These students often have enough general education credits and overall credits to graduate but do not have their major-specific credits completed.

=== Leave of absence ===
Students may take a leave of absence from their university for the difficult circumstances described below, or to pursue other endeavors, such as living, working, or studying abroad, tending to a fledgling business, or pursuing opportunities in their chosen career. Stanford University in particular is known for its sizable constituency of fifth-year (and sometimes even sixth-year) seniors who took time off to volunteer or work overseas. Many of Stanford's more famous alumni have taken a leave of absence and never returned to the school.

Another school well known in this regard is Brigham Young University, the flagship school of the Church of Jesus Christ of Latter-day Saints. Many male BYU students, both at the main campus in Utah and at its branch campuses in Hawaii and Idaho, take two years off during their studies to go on LDS missions. Both men and women are eligible to begin their missionary service at 18.

=== Poor choice of classes ===
Super-seniors often include students who chose their classes without considering graduation requirements. They are often missing important requirements for their major or core/general education. Additionally, in changing of majors this creates an important concept in core classes as well as other classes in the curriculum.

=== Music majors ===
For music majors, participation in music ensembles is an obvious requirement over the course of their college career. At many colleges, large ensembles (full choir, concert/marching/jazz band, and symphony orchestra) rehearse four hours a week for only one credit (typically, the number of credits correspond to hours spent in class per week). This is to encourage non-music majors to be in the ensembles; however, it is not unusual for music majors to carry 8 classes in a semester for a normal credit load of 15–16 credits. Due to this more intense time commitment, music majors often have to take 2 or more additional semesters to complete their graduation requirements.

=== Low grades ===
In many schools, the grade of "D" is enough to receive credit for a class, but not high enough to count towards the student's major or core/general education requirements. A student who receives too many D grades may have enough credits to graduate, but not good enough grades.

Occasionally a student may keep their grade point average high enough to remain in school, but still fail enough classes that they do not have enough credits to graduate at the end of their four years.

=== Desire to remain in school ===
Some super-seniors have enough credits and requirements to graduate, but do not apply for graduation. In most cases, universities do not automatically grant graduation without application, and as long as tuition is paid, students are not forced to leave the school. This is normally not applicable to high school.

Some super-seniors may be in their fifth or later year in the school but do not have enough credits to graduate. These students appear on paper as juniors or (simple) seniors and do not have enough credits to graduate with their peers.

Some super-seniors take a leave of absence or extra majors on purpose to remain in school for as long as possible.

Another example of a student's desire to remain in school is if the student is an accounting major intending to sit for the Uniform Certified Public Accountant Examination. Most states in the U.S. require CPA candidates to obtain at least 150 semester hours of college education. One way for a student to obtain the 150 semester hours required for the CPA Exam is to take additional accounting or business courses in the student's fifth or subsequent years without having to enroll in a postgraduate program.

=== Difficult or multiple majors ===
Students in high-stress majors such as mathematics, engineering, and accounting. Those who take a difficult double-major (within the same degree) or minor may choose to take a minimum number of classes (two, three, or four depending on the number of credits offered per class) at one time in order to achieve higher grades or superior retention.

=== Difficult circumstances ===
Occasionally, a student becomes ill or is injured mid-semester and cannot complete or pass the classes they have begun. If this occurs after the drop-deadline, the school may make a judgment as to whether to count the grades against them or drop the student from the semester. In either case, the student would need an additional semester to graduate.

Students may have other difficulties that prevent them from completing the graduation requirements in the traditional four years, such as raising a child or being required to work full-time. Such students may only attend classes on a part-time basis, taking over a decade to complete a bachelor's degree.

=== College-required classes ===
Many times, universities will require classes that fall under a "General Education Requirements" category in order to graduate. Often, universities will offer some of these classes (especially at smaller universities where number of teachers or resources are more limited) only once every few semesters. In some cases, students find it impossible (due to other courses, employment, or other reasons) to take these courses when they are offered and sometimes need to stay enrolled in the university for an extra semester or year until these classes are offered again.

=== Tuition-free fifth year for personal interest studies ===
At certain universities, such as the University of Rochester, students are given the unique opportunity to partake in the Take Five Scholars Program. In this program, the student receives a fifth year, or one additional semester, tuition free while the student studies a subject outside of their major. The student has to apply for this program before their eighth semester.

Another example is the Agnes Scott College, which also offers a Fifth Year program tuition-free. It is typically used to take courses that interest them but they could not take during their first four years, to finish a second major, or to take classes that are prerequisites for a graduate program they wish to pursue.

=== Cooperative education ===
Many colleges and universities offer a Cooperative Education program. In this program, a student has the opportunity to integrate work experience into their education through full-time employment during one or more semesters. Generally, a student will not enroll in any courses during the semester(s) of their full-time employment. Therefore, a student participating in Cooperative Education will require more than four years to complete their studies.

=== Wait-listed students ===
Students can be wait-listed when applying for college entrance or when enrolling in classes at their college or university. Being wait-listed (then being subsequently accepted off the waitlist later in the year) can delay students in earning credits for general education or toward their major. This situation may prevent students from having enough credits to graduate in the traditional four years of a college/university/etc.

=== Transfer students ===
Transfer students may have to spend a longer time getting their degrees since different universities have different requirements. Also, students may transfer to narrow down their major to a specific one; an engineering student at one school may want to transfer to another one to major in a specific type of engineering, for example.

=== Night students ===
Classes that night students need to graduate are not always available when the students are free. Work constraints, family, or other issues may create a situation where night students can only take a one to two classes per semester. This can lead to a senior having taken classes to remain as a student before the requisite courses are available.

== Effects ==
=== College or university ===
Some universities reduce or withdraw state funding after a student's fifth year. In addition, parents who are paying for their children's education and living expenses may lose patience and cut their student's funding. Fifth-year students are becoming more common as students increasingly choose to progress through difficult courses of study at a slower pace or pursue multiple majors or degrees. Although states often reduce or withdraw funding, there is still funding available to the students in the form of scholarships, as well as federal money such as work-study and student loans.

=== High school ===
Public high schools may allow a fifth year super-senior who does not have enough credits to graduate to continue attending their regular school, though students older than age 21 are usually required to attend "continuation school" meant for adults who have not graduated with a high school degree. Students forced into continuation school often choose to drop out or take the GED.

== Special education ==
In the United States, federal law (IDEA) states that public (state) schools are required to keep special-needs students in regular public schools (or a special education school if the student's IEP warrants it) until they graduate from that school or reach the age of 22.

== See also ==
- Grade retention
- Postgraduate year, extra year of education after certain high schools (secondary education) and before college
- Reclassification (education), graduating a year later to develop physically and academically
- Victory lap (academia)
