= Canadian College Italy =

Canadian-accredited school in Italy

- Canadian College Italy logo

Location
- Via Camillo Benso Conte di Cavour 13; Lanciano, Abruzzo, Chieti, 66034; Italy; 42°13′54″N 14°23′19″E

Information
- Type: Private boarding school
- Motto: Perge et Valeas (If you proceed, you shall succeed)
- Established: 1995; 31 years ago
- Founder: Marisa DiCarlo D'Alessandro
- Educational authority: Ontario Ministry of Education
- Director: Davide D'Alessandro
- Grades: 9 - 12
- Gender: Coeducational
- Language: English
- Website: www.canadiancollegeitaly.com

Canadian College Italy, also known as CCI, is an independent Canadian-accredited school in Lanciano, Abruzzo, Italy. The school is a co-educational university-preparatory school for grades 9 to 12.

CCI operates under the supervision of the Ontario Ministry of Education, as outlined by the Ministry's guidelines for Overseas Schools. The school prepares students for entrance into universities in the United States, UK, Canada and Europe. The school motto is Perge et Valeas (Proceed and you shall Succeed).

== History ==
Canadian College Italy (CCI) was founded by Marisa DiCarlo D'Alessandro in 1995 in Lanciano, Italy. CCI is Canada's only private high school in Italy and is a co-ed boarding school for Canadian, American and International students wishing to study abroad.

The Mission statement for the school is, "To provide a unique environment in which students experience a Renaissance: Academically, Socially and Culturally."

== Facilities ==
The main school building is a 14th-century three story stone and brick palazzo which is located on Via Cavour. This was a family home as early as the 1300s, and was later used as the Canadian Headquarters for troops during the World War II.

CCI Boys live on the top floor of the school building on Via Cavour. The girls are housed in the Town's oldest Inn, Antica Locanda Allegria.

== Academics ==
The School offers grades 9, 10, 11 and 12, and students may enroll for a single semester or for up to three academic years (two semesters per year). CCI is inspected by the Ministry of Education in the province of Ontario, Canada and students earn credits toward the Ontario Secondary School Diploma. CCI is also a member of the European Council of International Schools.
