= List of art schools in Quebec =

This is a list of art schools in Quebec, Canada.

== Music ==
- Académie de musique du Québec
- Conservatoire de musique et d'art dramatique du Québec

== Cinema, TV and 2D/3D animation ==
- Centre national d'animation et de design
- Institut Desgraff
- Institut national de l'image et du son
- Mel Hoppenheim School of Cinema

== Circus and street arts ==
- École de cirque de Québec
- École de Cirque de Verdun
- École nationale de cirque
- Les Forains Abyssaux

== Theatre and dance ==
- Conservatoire d'art dramatique de Montréal
- Conservatoire Lassalle
- École nationale de l'humour
- École supérieure de ballet contemporain de Montréal
- National Theatre School of Canada
- Playwrights' Workshop Montreal

== Visual arts ==
- Centre des arts visuels / Visual Arts Centre
- Institut de création artistique et de recherche en infographie
- Academy of Fine Arts of Quebec/ L’Académie des Beaux-Arts de Québec
- Syn Studio École d’art / Art School

== University ==
- Concordia University Fine Arts Faculty
- McGill University
- Université de Montréal Faculté de Musique
- Université du Québec à Montréal Faculté des Arts
- Université Laval Faculté d'Aménagement, architecture et arts visuels

== See also ==
- Culture of Quebec
- List of schools in Canada
