= Education in British Columbia =

Educational oversight
- Minister of Education and Child Care: Lisa Beare

National education budget (2025-2026)
- Budget: CAN$ 9.828 billion

General details
- Primary languages: English
- System type: Regional school boards shares power with provincial government

Enrollment (2022-23)
- Total: 679,281

Attainment (2020-2021)
- Secondary diploma: 86%

Education in British Columbia comprises public and private primary and secondary schools throughout the province. Like most other provinces in Canada, education is compulsory from ages 6–16 (grades 1–10), although the vast majority of students remain in school until they graduate from high school (grade 12) at the age of 18. In 2020, 86% of students in British Columbia graduated from high school within six years of entering grade 8. It is also common for children to attend kindergarten at the age of 5, and it is increasingly common for even younger children to attend pre-school or early learning programs before their formal school age years.

Public schools are the most common form of school in British Columbia, enrolling approximately 586,000 (86.5%) students in 2022–2023. Public schools are broadly administered by the British Columbia Ministry of Education, although each of British Columbia's 60 public school districts are governed by a board of school trustees that are elected alongside municipal mayors and councilors every four years. As education falls under provincial jurisdiction, the province's public education system is governed by the Government of British Columbia. In 2020–2021, the Government of British Columbia spent almost $10 billion on its K-12 system of education childcare, representing 10.4% of its provincial budget. Although the primarily language of instruction in public schools in English, the Conseil scolaire francophone de la Colombie-Britannique was established in 1995 to operate French-language public schools for francophones throughout the entire province.

British Columbia also has the largest private school sector in Canada, enrolling 89,427 (13.2%) of the province's students in 2022–2023. Private schools are officially and commonly known as independent schools. A wide variety of independent schools exist to serve particular groups within British Columbia; schools may be religious (e.g. Christian, Jewish, or Muslim), may teach according to a particular pedagogy (e.g. Waldorf or Montessori), may focus on particular disciplines (e.g. sports or fine arts), or may focus on university preparation. Compared to other provinces across Canada, independent schools are treated favourably in educational policy. Most independent schools receive 50% of the operational funding that public schools in the same school district receive from the provincial government and may award the province's certificate of graduation, the Dogwood Diploma.

A small minority of students in British Columbia are also homeschooled, with 4,131 students or 0.6% of the student population being homeschooled in 2022–2023, a figure that doubled through the COVID-19 pandemic. British Columbia is unique in that many of the students educated at home are enrolled with or attend online schools.

== History ==
The earliest formal education in British Columbia began in the mid-1800s, a time when British Columbia was still in the beginning stages of its colonial development. The Hudson's Bay Company was one of the pioneers in British Columbia and established a company school for the children of its employees in local forts and settlements. The Anglican Church, as the state church of English and the dominant church in the colonies of Vancouver Island and British Columbia, was also one of the first institutions to run formal schools in the province, soon followed by the Catholic Church. Both the company schools and the religious schools charged fees to the students' parents to supplement grants by the Hudson's Bay Company, the church, and the local colonial offices.

Over time, a growing number of people in the colonies wanted a free, non-sectarian education system as championed by Egerton Ryerson in Ontario. Some of the foremost advocates for this new type of school system was Amor de Cosmos and John Robson, two figures men who would later become premiers of British Columbia. In 1865, the Colony of Vancouver Island passed the Common Schools Act which officially made schools under its control non-sectarian and generously supported by public funding, although entirely free. A year later, after the colonies of Vancouver Island and British Columbia were united into a single colony of British Columbia, one of the first acts of the British Columbian legislature was to re-affirm this arrangement by the passage of the Common School Ordinance. In 1872, a year after British Columbia entered the Confederation of Canada, the province passed the Free Public School Act which made the public system of education entirely free. Between 1872 and 1878, the number of public schools increased from fourteen to forty-five with enrolment growing from about 500 students to over 2000.

After the passage of these bills, a few independent schools continued to operate throughout British Columbia, notably Catholic schools and Anglican schools for the province's upper class. Excluded from public funding, the Catholic schools in particular struggled over the next century. In 1977, independent schools received its first public support and recognition from the provincial government through the passage of the Independent Schools Support Act. The current model for independent education in British Columbia was established by the Independent School Act of 1989, a proposal that passed through the British Columbia legislature with the support of both the governing Social Credit Party and the official opposition, the NDP.

== Structure ==
=== Public Schools ===
The public school system is primarily governed by the School Act, which sets out the basic structure of British Columbia's public education system. For example, the School Act stipulates that public schools "must be conducted on strictly secular and non-sectarian principles."

The public school system is split into 60 separate public school districts representing 1,571 public schools in British Columbia. Fifty-nine of these public school districts are based on geography, with one school district (District 93) governing the francophone schools within the province. Each school district is responsible for overseeing the mix of public elementary schools, high schools, and specialty schools within their territory. Each school district is governed by a board of school trustees elected by the public concurrent with municipal elections.

The public school sector in British Columbia is home to one of the province's most powerful unions, the British Columbia Teachers' Federation, which represents over 46,000 public school teachers across British Columbia.

The province disburses funds to each public school based on a per student full time equivalent formula. Although the primary factor in funding is the number of students attending a public school, the province other factors like geography, the number of students in special education, and the number of Indigenous students. This funding formula was last reviewed in 2018.

=== Independent Schools ===
The Independent School Act is the overarching legislation that governs independent schools in British Columbia. All independent schools are subject to three basic requirements:

1. no program is in existence or is proposed at the independent school that would, in theory or in practice, promote or foster doctrines of (i) racial or ethnic superiority or persecution, (ii) religious intolerance or persecution, (iii) social change through violent action, or (iv) sedition,
2. the independent school facilities comply with the enactments of British Columbia and the municipality or regional district in which the facilities are located, and
3. the authority complies with this [Independent School] Act and the [related] regulations.

The act and related regulations further outlines four groups of independents schools, each with various characteristics, requirements, and benefits.

==== Group 1 Independent Schools ====
Group 1 independent schools are by far the most common form of independent school in British Columbia and the schools that are most like their public school counterparts. They are required to be non-profit organizations, generally hire qualified teachers, participate in provincial exams, provide the same number of hours of instruction as public schools, teach provincially required courses, use educational resources determined by the ministry of education, follow provincial graduation requirements, and undergo periodic government inspections. Their per student funding may not exceed the per student funding that public schools within their district receive. They receive 50% of the per student full time equivalent funding as the public schools in their district and may award Dogwood Diplomas.

==== Group 2 Independent Schools ====
Group 2 independent schools have the exact same requirements and benefits as group 1 schools except that they may spend more per student than the public school district's average and thus receive only 35% of per student full time equivalent funding. Schools in this category tend to be "elite" or "university preparatory" schools.

Group 3 Independent Schools

Beyond the basic requirements common to all independent schools, Group 3 schools must only comply with two additional requirements: a majority of their students must be residents of British Columbia and they must undergo government inspections periodically. This arrangement provides Group 3 schools with significant freedom of how to operate, but they receive no public funding and cannot award a Dogwood diploma at the end of high school.

Group 4 Independent Schools

Group 4 independent schools primarily service international or interprovincial students with the requirement that they must pay a per student bond to the province. Although they share many of the same requirements as Group 1 or 2 schools and may award a Dogwood Diploma, they are not eligible for public funding.

=== Registered Homeschooling ===
Parents have the option, according to Sections 12 & 13 of the School Act, to register their children with a public or independent school as a registered homeschooler. In British Columbia, there is often confusion about who counts as a homeschooled child due to the existence of online public and independent schools. The Ministry of Education only counts registered homeschoolers as homeschooled students, yet many students who are enrolled in an online school but learn at home consider themselves homeschoolers. There is a significant difference between being enrolled in a school and registered with a school. The term enrolled is used for students who “belong” to particular school and take course from that school. Registered students learn at home but are affiliated with a particular school for the purposes of tracking students and providing provincial examinations; however, they do not take courses directly from that school. For example, most homeschooled students in British Columbia are registered but not enrolled with an online school such as Heritage Christian Online School. Other students are “homeschooled” in the sense that they learn from home, but they are enrolled in an online school. For example, a high school student studying at home may be enrolled in Heritage Christian Online School to take Chemistry 12. In the eyes of the Ministry of Education only registered homeschooling students are true homeschooled, although many more students enrolled with online schools would identity as homeschooled. Thus, online schools often serve a mix of registered homeschooled students and enrolled online school students.

Parents of students from kindergarten to Grade 9 must choose whether to enroll or register their children with a particular school. No K-9 student can be both enrolled and registered. This requirement changes for the last three years of high school. In order to better facilitate the graduation of homeschooled students, the Ministry of Education allows registered homeschool students to also enroll in Grade 10, 11, and 12 courses, satisfy provincial graduation requirements, and thus secure a Dogwood Diploma.

Registered homeschooling allows for a considerable degree of freedom for a parent to educate their children. Homeschooling parents are completely responsible for the educational program of their children, not required to meet provincial standards, not required to use provincial curriculum, not inspected by the Ministry of Education, and not required to use standardized tests.

=== Offshore Schools ===
British Columbia offshore schools are schools located outside Canada that are authorized by the Government of British Columbia to offer the province’s educational curriculum. They operate under the British Columbia Offshore School Program, administered by the British Columbia Ministry of Education and Child Care.

The program was established in 1998 to make the British Columbia curriculum available to students studying outside Canada. In September 2002, the British Columbia Ministry of Education announced that 20 schools in the People’s Republic of China, Taiwan, and Japan had been selected to begin working toward provincial certification. The expansion followed amendments to the School Act that provided a framework for offshore schools to work with British Columbia school districts, companies, independent schools, and educational consultants in meeting provincial certification requirements.

Students enrolled in the British Columbia program receive instruction based on the provincial curriculum. At the secondary level, students who complete British Columbia’s graduation requirements are eligible to receive the British Columbia Certificate of Graduation, commonly known as the Dogwood Diploma, the same provincial graduation credential awarded to qualifying students in British Columbia. Graduation requirements include required and elective course credits as well as provincial literacy and numeracy assessments.

=== First Nations schools ===
Unlike in other provinces and territories in Canada, First Nations in British Columbia have a unique legal framework to manage schools, independent from provincial jurisdiction.

== Graduation Requirements ==
In order to graduate from high school in British Columbia with a Dogwood Diploma, students are required by the province to earn a minimum of 80 credits in grades 10–12. Although 28 credits (equivalent to 7 typical courses) may be elective courses, the following courses are required for graduation:

- A Language Arts 10 (4 credits)
- A Language Arts 11 (4 credits)
- A Language Arts 12 (4 credits)
- A Social Studies 10 (4 credits)
- A Social Studies 11 or 12 (4 credits)
- A Mathematics 10 (4 credits)
- A Mathematics 11 or 12 (4 credits)
- A Science 10 (4 credits)
- A Science 11 or 12 (4 credits)
- Physical and Health Education 10 (4 credits)
- An Arts Education and/or an Applied Design, Skills, and Technologies 10, 11, or 12 (4 credits)
- Career Life Education (4 credits)
- Career Life Connections (4 credits)
- Indigenous-focused (4 credits)

A single course can be used to satisfy more than one requirement. For example, the course Contemporary Indigenous Studies 12 can be used to fulfill both Socials 11/12 and Indigenous-focused.

== Enrollment ==
School Year	Total Enrollment	Public School Enrollment	Independent School Enrollment	Homeschool Registrations
1997 / 1998	615,798	615,801	..	..
1998 / 1999	612,708	612,708	..	..
1999 / 2000	611,820	611,820	..	..
2000 / 2001	608,823	608,823	..	..
2001 / 2002	605,499	605,496	..	..
2002 / 2003	595,206	595,203	..	..
2003 / 2004	588,009	588,009	..	..
2004 / 2005	581,319	581,319	..	..
2005 / 2006	575,082	575,082	..	..
2006 / 2007	631,071	564,663	65,367	1,038
2007 / 2008	625,038	558,750	65,475	813
2008 / 2009	619,332	553,563	65,076	690
2009 / 2010	614,715	549,432	64,728	555
2010 / 2011	638,232	565,728	70,272	2,229
2011 / 2012	630,825	556,875	71,868	2,085
2012 / 2013	627,993	551,622	74,310	2,061
2013 / 2014	624,927	546,819	76,074	2,034
2014 / 2015	625,962	543,105	80,634	2,220
2015 / 2016	629,160	545,253	81,660	2,247
2016 / 2017	635,706	549,921	83,469	2,316
2017 / 2018	642,993	555,735	84,996	2,256
2018 / 2019	649,893	561,501	86,082	2,310
2019 / 2020	657,753	568,074	87,222	2,454
2020 / 2021	654,147	561,312	87,291	5,547
2021 / 2022	667,284	574,047	88,722	4,515
2022 / 2023	679,281	585,723	89,427	4,131

== See also ==
- Education in Canada
- Homeschooling in Canada
- List of school districts in British Columbia
- Higher education in British Columbia
