= Ise =

Ise may refer to:

== Places ==
=== Japan ===
- Ise, Mie, a city
- Ise Bay
- Ise Province
- Ise Grand Shrine, in the city

=== Elsewhere ===
- Ise Ekiti, Nigeria
- Ise, Norway, Norway
- River Ise, England
- Ise (river), Germany

== People ==
- Mariya Ise (伊瀬 茉莉也; born 1988), Japanese actress
- Takemi Ise (伊勢 多恵美; born 1963), Japanese swimmer
- Lady Ise (c. 875–c. 938), Japanese poet
- Ise (stylized ISE), Danish singer and participant on X Factor

== Ships ==
- Japanese battleship Ise (1915–1945)
- JDS Ise (DDH-182), Japanese helicopter carrier (launched 2008)

== Other uses ==
- The Tales of Ise (Ise monogatari), Heian-period poetry
- Ise Nanao, a character in the Bleach manga
- -ise, a verb-forming suffix in English

== See also ==
- ISE (disambiguation)
