= Ontario Academic Credit =

School education in Ontario, Canada

The Ontario Academic Credit (OAC), which may also be known as 12b (French: Cours préuniversitaire de l'Ontario or CPO) was a fifth year of secondary school education that previously existed in the province of Ontario, Canada, designed for students preparing for post-secondary education. The OAC curriculum was codified by the Ontario Ministry of Education in Ontario Schools: Intermediate and Senior (OS:IS) and its revisions. The Ontario education system had a final fifth year of secondary education, known as Grade 13 from 1921 to 1988; grade 13 was replaced by OAC for students starting high school (grade 9) in 1984.

OAC continued to act as a fifth year of secondary education until it was phased out in 2003.

== History ==
The fifth year in the Ontario secondary school system had existed in Ontario for 82 years, from 1921 to 2003, first as Grade 13 and then as the Ontario Academic Credit (OAC). The first attempt to reform the education system in Ontario was initiated in 1945, with the Royal Commission on Education, which proposed a three-tiered education system with six years of elementary education, followed by four years of secondary education, and culminating in three years of junior colleges. However, the commission's report was shelved after five years, in part because of its potential to reopen the politically-sensitive issue of separate school funding and also because of the Minister of Education's prior interference in curriculum redesign a year earlier.

=== 1960s–1980s: Early proposals for reform and introduction of the Ontario Academic Credit system ===
The threat to the fifth year of secondary school education in Ontario grew significantly during the 1960s, with growing opposition to the grade 13 departmental examinations from parents. That led to the establishment of the Grade 13 Study Committee in 1964 by Education Minister Bill Davis, which recommended the elimination of both the departmental examinations and grade 13. A subsequent recommendation in 1968, in the Hall-Dennis Report, also called for the elimination of grade 13. In spite of the recommendations, however, grade 13 was maintained by the Ontario government.

Significant opposition from parents, businesses, and universities regarding the education reforms had surfaced by the 1970s, and they believed there was a decline in academic standards, a lack of focus in the curriculum, and lax discipline in schools. Combined with financially-pressured school boards beginning to call for the abolition of grade 13 as a means of financial restraint, that resulted in the government reevaluating its secondary education system. The resulting document was the Ontario Schools: Intermediate and Senior (OS:IS), which had called for the formal elimination of grade 13 without formally eliminating the fifth year of secondary education.

Acting upon the recommendations of the document, Ontario formally eliminated grade 13 in 1984, and introduced the Ontario Academic Credit system. The new system allowed for students to graduate from secondary schools in four years but also maintaining the fifth year, known as OAC, which had courses catering for students planning to proceed with post-secondary education. Despite the fact that students could graduate from the secondary school system in four years, a fifth year of secondary education continued to persist in Ontario, with fewer than 15 percent of students exercising the option to graduate in four years; reports stated that between 20 percent and 25 percent of students chose to repeat one or more OAC years.

=== 1995: Final phase-out and elimination ===
Another Royal Commission on Learning, set up in 1995 by the 35th Legislative Assembly of Ontario provincial government, had recommended the elimination of OAC. The incoming 36th Legislative Assembly of Ontario provincial government acted upon the recommendations of the commission in 1998, but students still in the five-year system would continue in the OAC system until they graduated. The motivation for phasing out OAC was largely thought of as a cost-saving measure by the Progressive Conservatives that would bring Ontario into line with the rest of the provinces. The reforms led to a new, standardized curriculum documented in Ontario Secondary Schools, Grades 9 to 12: Program and Diploma Requirements (OSS). The OAC year was replaced with an extra ten days of schooling in each lower grade, and the material was integrated into the earlier years of education. The last graduating class of OAC was in 2003.

== Course load ==
There were two high school diplomas in Ontario, the Secondary School Graduation Diploma (SSGD) which was awarded after Grade 12 and the Secondary School Honours Graduation Diploma (SSHGD) awarded after Grade 13. This practice ended with the replacement of both diplomas in 1988 with the Ontario Secondary School Diploma (OSSD) under OS:IS. OS:IS more formally allowed for the completion of schooling after only 12 grades. Under OS:IS, OAC year was the final year of high school in Ontario.

OAC courses were the highest level courses in Ontario high schools until the formal elimination of the Ontario Academic Credit. To enter university, students were required to complete 30 high school credits (courses can have different credit values, but most courses were worth 1 credit; some courses were compulsory and there were other restrictions), 6 of which had to be at the OAC level. Assuming that one had taken the necessary prerequisite courses, one could complete an OAC course before the OAC year, and so in many schools it was common for Grade 11 or Grade 12 students to have taken some OAC courses. Students who completed these requirements in 4 years of high school were permitted to graduate; this practice was known as fast-tracking, finishing Grade 12 in four years with 30 credits if the student was university bound. Under the old Grade 13 system, the SSGD represented 27 credits and the SSHGD usually represented 33 credits (however, as long as you could pass the 6 credits required for an SSHGD, the Ontario school system was required to award the OSSHGD, even if you had less than 33 credits overall). A minority of students completed the old program in four years by completing eight credits per year and one summer school credit (usually Grade 12 mathematics, as each math course had the previous year as prerequisite).

Students with an average of 80 percent or higher in six OAC courses were named Ontario Scholar. The award continues to exist today, although it requires the student to have 80 percent or higher in six grade 12 courses.

== Consequences of elimination ==
The elimination of the fifth year of high school education in Ontario led to a number of consequences, most notably the double cohorts in 2003, in which an unusually high proportion of students graduated in Ontario. Since the elimination of OAC, some have noted that a greater proportion of students have entered post-secondary education. However, in a paper published by Harry Krashinsky of the University of Toronto, the author found that the elimination of OAC had a large and negative impact on academic performance in university.

=== Double cohorts ===
The elimination of OAC led to a spike in more than 100,000 students graduating in 2003, with the last OAC (OS:IS) class and the first Grade 12 (OSS) class graduating in the same year. This strained many Ontario post-secondary institutions, as the spike in students forced the institutions to either construct or rent new buildings for student housing. With the increase in students entering post-secondary education, the provincial government set aside additional funding for colleges and universities to build more infrastructure such as residences and classrooms. They also had to provide more resources such as upgrading libraries, adding more study areas, creating new programs, and hiring additional professors and teaching assistants. For those who were unable to enter post-secondary institutions, the provincial government allocated more funding for the apprentice program. The spike in students graduating in 2003 had also led to more competitive admission standards in most Ontario universities along with arbitrarily short-lived higher standards to graduate from universities. Some students under OS:IS who feared that they might not be able to gain admission to the university of their choice as a result of the double cohort decided to fast-track to graduate before 2003; as well, some students under OSS decided to take an extra year of high school to graduate in 2004 or delayed application to post-secondary institutions. Double-cohort students who chose the latter options in their turn affected those in the year after them, creating a ripple effect. A higher-than-typical number of withdrawals from group education fund investments to pay for post-secondary expenses resulted in lower payout per individual in the double cohort year. In June 2007, a cascade double-cohort effect occurred at universities and the job market, as double cohort students who were finishing their undergraduate studies in April competed for graduate spaces in universities or employment in the job market.

=== Drinking age ===
The elimination of OAC resulted in the majority of incoming first-year students in Ontario universities to drop from 19 to 18 years of age. This created a legal liability to universities as the majority of first-year students were now below the legal drinking age (it is 19 in Ontario). This has forced the universities to eliminate or police many frosh-week events and traditions that allegedly encouraged drinking and has banned the consumption of alcohol at most frosh-week events. Queen's University's Student Orientation Activities Review Board (SOARB) noted in 2005 that

[F]irst-year students seemed to show more desire to drink than those of the past few years. Student drinking, prior to attendance, compromised events at which no alcohol was available... The Board wonders if there is merit to making the evening hours busier to avoid allowing time to "pre-drink" before events.

With a significant minority of students below the legal drinking age, 18-year-olds are legally excluded from many campus events and social activities. The temporal nature of this exclusion and the stress associated with establishing a social network in an unfamiliar environment creates intense pressure for underage students to either find ways to subvert the Ontario drinking laws (by purchasing fake IDs, using real IDs of other people, or drinking in private residences with ill-gotten alcohol) or sacrifice relationships with those of legal drinking age.

== Assessment of elimination ==
Patrick Brady and Philip Allingham of Lakehead University have argued that the provincial government's attempt to bring Ontario in line with the rest of the continent's 12 grades system has only been partially successful. While the fifth year of secondary education was formally eliminated, both have noted that the fifth year in secondary schools is still a norm in Ontario, with students in Ontario still opting to take a fifth year in secondary school, colloquially known as the victory lap.

In the first few years after OAC had been eliminated, more than 32 percent of students returned for a fifth year. The percentage of students who opt for a fifth year has since decreased to between 15 percent to 20 percent, with some predicting it to level out around that level. In the 2007–2008 year, students over the age of 19 made up 3.7 percent of all secondary day school enrolment in Ontario.

Both Brady and Allingham note that the motivations behind the victory lap can be traced to the province's history of a fifth year of secondary school education, making it a basic assumption of secondary school life for students in Ontario. They also note that it may represent a form of transition anxiety, as students seek to prolong their secondary education, which can be seen as a safe environment, or to acquire further maturity before moving on to their post-secondary education. They also note how the centrality of secondary school life can make a student prolong it. While they found it was not a universal phenomenon, they noted a number of students who returned for a fifth year primarily to continue their participation in the school's non-academic programming. In Brady's and Allingham's study, they had also found differences between genders. While close to half of male participants in their study opted to spend a fifth year in secondary schools, only one in five females choose to do so. They also noted that the motivations of both genders differed, with females opting to victory lap in order to gain additional academic credits, while males primarily opted for a fifth year in order to participate in sports and to gain maturity.

== See also ==
- Education in Canada
- Education in Ontario
- CEGEP

Preceded by Grade 12	Grade 13 age 18–19	Succeeded by Higher education
