= List of school districts in Canada =

The list of Canadian school districts has been split by province and territory:

- List of school authorities in Alberta
- List of school districts in British Columbia
- List of school districts in Manitoba
- List of school districts in New Brunswick
- List of school districts in Newfoundland and Labrador
- List of school districts in Nova Scotia
- List of school districts in Ontario
- List of school districts in Prince Edward Island
- List of school districts in Quebec
- List of school divisions in Saskatchewan
- List of school districts in the Northwest Territories

== See also ==
- Education in Canada
- Lists of schools in Canada
