= Homeschooling in Canada =

In Canada, homeschooling has increased in popularity since the advent of the 21st century. It is legal in every province, with each province having its own regulations around the practice. In some provinces, funding is available. In 2016, the number of homeschooled children in Canada was approximately 60,000 (for comparison, there were approximately 2.5 million in the US); this corresponds to approximately one in every 127 school-aged children (US: one in every 32 children). In 2020, the average growth rate of the practice amounted to more than 5 per cent per year. Canada has a large proportion of non-religiously motivated homeschoolers compared to some other countries. It is also one of three countries worldwide, along with the United States and South Africa, that hosts an organization with lawyers on staff which serves the legal needs of home educators.

== History ==
Unlike in some other countries, there has never been a time in which homeschooling was illegal in Canada. The Ontario Education Act, for example, states in Section 21(2)(a) that "A person is excused from attendance at school if [...] the person is receiving education elsewhere."

Homeschooling started to become significantly more popular in Canada in the 1970s. In 1979, just over 2,000 Canadian children were being homeschooled. In 1995, Meighan estimated the total number of homeschoolers in Canada to be 10,000 official and 20,000 unofficial. Karl M. Bunday estimated, in 1995, based on journalistic reports, that about 1 percent of school-age children were homeschooled. In April 2005, the total number of registered homeschool students in British Columbia was 3,068. In Manitoba, homeschoolers are required to register with Manitoba Education, Citizenship and Youth. The number of homeschoolers was noted at over 1500 in 2006; 0.5% of students enrolled in the public system. In 2016, approximately 1% to 2% of North American children are homeschooled, which includes about 60,000 in Canada.

One technique that is specifically Canadian, specifically British Columbian, is the distributed learning approach to homeschooling. Distributed learning is an online program that is directed by a teacher that meets provincial standards for education. The program draws on public and private curricula. This is distinctive to British Columbia because it is the only province that has a distributed learning policy. It is one of the most popular forms of homeschooling.

Following the COVID-19 pandemic, the number of homeschooled children in Canada more than doubled, with nearly 84,000 students enrolled in the 2020-2021 school year, compared to around 41,000 in the previous year.

== Regulations ==
Each province has its own regulations. Some provinces have implemented policies that require parents to notify school boards of their decision to homeschool. Every province requires parents to notify the school system of their intent to withdraw their child from the public school system and to begin homeschooling. Five of ten provinces additionally require parents to submit a detailed curriculum. Seven of these provinces do not require the program to be monitored by the school board or other private school administrators, and only five provinces require routine inspection of homeschooling. These policies, however, are not law; although Canadian legislators recognize the importance of state controls in the homeschooling environment, it is ultimately up to the parent to decide when and how to homeschool. Despite a positive environment that supports and encourages alternatives to traditional schooling, it is estimated that less than 0.5% of Canadian families were homeschooling in 2015. This number is probably inaccurate, however, as many parents do not report their decisions to homeschool.

== Motivations ==
Unlike the United States for example, where homeschooling is often a consequence of religious conviction, a study of 1,600 families in 2003 found that Canadians primarily choose to homeschool out of a desire to provide better education. For those children whose parents decided to homeschool out of a desire to better education, a 2003 study found statistical significance between traditionally schooled and homeschooled students scores on standardized tests of writing, reading, and mathematics. A 2011 study found that style of home education (structured versus unstructured) was a more important predictor of standardized test performance than other traditional measures, such as income and parents' educational attainment. These findings are similar to findings in US research on homeschooled children and the outcomes of homeschooling.

== See also ==
- Education in Canada
