= List of schools in Yukon =

This is a list of schools in Yukon, Canada. There are 28 schools in total, 14 in Whitehorse and 14 situated in the rural communities. They're each governed by a school council except for École Émilie-Tremblay, governed by Yukon's only school board, Commission scolaire francophone du Yukon. School councils are made up of locally elected and appointed members of the community who have important roles in providing advice and making decisions about some of the operation of schools.

School name	Community	Grades available
Centre scolaire secondaire communautaire Paul-Émile Mercier	Whitehorse	7-12
Chief Zzeh Gittlit	Old Crow	K–9
Christ the King Elementary	Whitehorse	K–7
Del Van Gorder	Faro	K–12
Elijah Smith Elementary	Whitehorse	K–7
Eliza Van Bibber	Pelly Crossing	K–12
École Émilie-Tremblay	Whitehorse	K–6
F.H. Collins Secondary	Whitehorse	8–12
Ghùch Tlâ Community School	Carcross	K–9
Golden Horn Elementary	Whitehorse	K–7
Grey Mountain Primary	Whitehorse	K–3
Hidden Valley Elementary	Whitehorse	K–7
Holy Family Elementary	Whitehorse	K–7
Individual Learning Centre	Whitehorse	9-12
J.V. Clark	Mayo, Yukon	K–12
Jack Hulland Elementary	Whitehorse	K–7
Johnson Elementary	Watson Lake	K–7
Kluane Lake	Destruction Bay	K–8
Nelnah Bessie John	Beaver Creek	K–9
Porter Creek Secondary	Whitehorse	8–12
Robert Service School	Dawson City	K–12
Ross River School	Ross River	K–10
Selkirk Elementary	Whitehorse	K–7
St. Elias Community	Haines Junction	K–12
St. Francis of Assisi Catholic Secondary School (formerly called Vanier Catholic Secondary School until 2022)	Whitehorse	8–12
Takhini Elementary	Whitehorse	K–7
Tantalus	Carmacks	K–12
Khàtìnas.àxh Community School (formerly called Teslin School until 2018)	Teslin	K–9
Watson Lake Secondary	Watson Lake	8–12
Whitehorse Elementary	Whitehorse	K–7
