= Victory lap (academia) =

Practice of taking extra years of study in secondary or undergraduate institutions

A victory lap is a term used in American and Canadian academics to describe one or more extra years of study needed beyond the traditional four years of secondary, or undergraduate studies. These added years are generally the result of switching midstream to a different major or program. In certain cases such as engineering and teaching and life science degrees, the victory lap is instead attributed to increased course load and stress.

Other slang terms used to represent this same idea include "jewel degree", "5th year senior", "super senior", and "Van Wilder" (in reference to the 2002 film National Lampoon's Van Wilder). Elsewhere, in places that victory laps are not available to students, the slang term "Super senior" is a derogatory term for high schoolers who are held back a year due to personal failings, unintentionally, and as such spend one year longer to graduate than anyone else taking the same courseload would.

== Ontario ==
The term victory lap is used to refer to the additional years of secondary education a student may take in Ontario. The term Grade 13 is also used to refer to a victory lap in Ontario. Grade 13 was previously an academic grade in Ontario secondary schools, offered from 1921 to 1988. In 1988, Grade 13 was reorganized into the Ontario Academic Credit, which continued to be offered until 2003. After 2003, Ontario's secondary schools formally offered only four grades of schooling (Grades 9 to 12).

However, Patrick Brady and Philip Allingham of Lakehead University, has argued that the provincial government's attempt to bring Ontario in line with the rest of the continent's 12 grades system has only been partially successful. They noted that the concept of students taking a fifth year of secondary school, colloquially known as the victory lap, was still viewed as a "provincial norm". During the 2010–2011 academic year, 73 per cent of students in Grade 12 managed to complete their secondary studies in four years, with over 20,000 Grade 12 students, or 14 per cent of Ontario's Grade 12 student population returning for a "victory lap," in the following year.

In September 2013, the Government of Ontario introduced a 34-credit threshold (30 credits is necessary to receive the Ontario Secondary School Diploma), (Note: Exemptions to the credit threshold exists, which includes students with special education needs.) in an effort to limit the length of study for its secondary school students. The Government of Ontario estimates the credit cap would save the province C$22 million each year. In the 2016–2017 academic year, students 19 years or older made up 3 per cent of public secondary day school attendance in Ontario.

As of September 2013, "resident pupils" of Ontario have the right to attend a public secondary school until they have received their 34th course credit, attended the school for seven years, or are at least 20 and have not been enrolled in a school in the last four years. The secondary school then reserves the right to refuse further admission to the student.
