= Contact North =

Canadian distance education network

Contact North (French: Contact Nord) is a distance education network in the Canadian province of Ontario, with 112 online learning centres throughout the province. Based principally in Sudbury and Thunder Bay, the network partners with Ontario's 24 public colleges, 22 public universities and 250 public literacy and essential skills and training providers to help Ontarians in over 600 communities across the province participate in education and training opportunities without leaving their own community.

The organization's student portal helps students and prospective students across the province find information on more than 18,000 online courses and more than 1,000 online programs offered by Ontario's public high schools, colleges and universities.

Contact North also acts as an advocate, catalyst and facilitator of innovation in online and distance learning, as well as assisting in the creation and development of distance education programs in other provinces and countries.

== History ==
In 1986, Contact North was established by the Ontario government to provide fully bilingual access to courses and programs offered by colleges, universities and high schools to residents of Ontario's northern communities. Contact North remains primarily funded by the Ministry of Colleges, Universities, Research Excellence and Security.

In 1992, through funding from the Ministry of Northern Development and Mines, almost every secondary school in Northern Ontario was equipped with Contact North audiographic teleconferencing equipment. This equipment gave all schools electronic access to more than 100 other schools in communities across Northern Ontario and beyond. It also allowed high school students a chance to tour museums, galleries, and other organizations electronically, which the student would not otherwise get a chance to visit. Some of these places include Art Gallery of Ontario, located in Toronto, and the Royal Canadian Mint in Ottawa.

In 2007, the then Ministry of Training, Colleges and Universities announced the launch of a distance education network to provide access to post-secondary education opportunities for residents of small and rural communities across Southern Ontario. The new network was developed to operate under a model similar to Contact North, and Contact North was asked to help facilitate the startup of the project. Originally called the Eastern and Southern Ontario Distance and Education Network, the new network became elearnnetwork.ca.

In 2011, Contact North's mandate expanded to include serving all of Ontario and taking on the responsibilities of elearnnetwork.ca.
