= International Student Exchange, Ontario =

International Student Exchange - Ontario (ISE Ontario) is a registered non-profit organization based in Barrie, Ontario that provides Ontario students the opportunity to participate in reciprocal student exchange programs with France, Switzerland, Spain, Germany, Italy and Quebec.

== History ==
These reciprocal exchange programs were first organized in Ontario by the Ontario Ministry of Education in the 1970s, but in the late 1990s the Ministry divested the programs, at which point ISE Ontario began running the programs. According to the Windsor Star, "Organized through International Student Exchange Ontario, the coed program allows foreign teens to get a taste of Canadian life, and vice versa."

In 2002, listed desired outcomes for students in the program included: developing language skills; sharing family and school life; increasing cultural awareness; enhancing understanding and tolerance of others; gaining confidence, responsibility and self-reliance; and returning home with new appreciation of their country.

== Programs ==
The organization offers 9 week exchange programs for Grade 8 students with France or Switzerland, and a 12 week exchange for secondary students (typically in grades 10 and 11) with France, Switzerland, Spain, Germany, or Italy.

ISE Ontario offers a 3 week summer exchange programs for students aged 13–17 with Switzerland or Quebec, or 4 week summer exchange program for students aged 13–17 with France, Spain, Germany, or Italy.
