= List of school districts in Newfoundland and Labrador =

This is a list of school districts in Newfoundland and Labrador.

- Newfoundland and Labrador English School District
- Conseil Scolaire Francophone

Former school districts:

- Eastern School District of Newfoundland and Labrador
- Nova Central School District
