= List of Canada-accredited schools abroad =

These are schools outside Canada which are accredited to use the curriculum of a province of Canada:

== Africa ==
=== Ghana ===
- Canadian Independent College of Ghana

== Americas ==
=== Bermuda ===
Alberta

- Mount Saint Agnes Academy

=== Colombia ===
Medellin

British Columbia

- The Canadian School

=== Mexico ===
Mazatlán

Alberta

- Colegio Rex Canadian International School

=== St. Martin/St. Maarten ===
Ontario

- Caribbean International Academy (Top Preparatory Day & Boarding School)

=== St. Lucia ===
New Brunswick

- International School of St. Lucia

=== Trinidad and Tobago ===
Ontario

- Maple Leaf International School
- Trillium International School

== Asia ==
=== Cambodia ===
Alberta

- Canadian International School of Phnom Penh

=== China ===
==== Anhui ====
British Columbia

- Canada Hefei Secondary School

==== Beijing ====
British Columbia

- Canada Langfang Secondary School
- Sino Bright No. 8 School
- Sino-Bright No. 25 School

Manitoba

- Yang Guang Qing School of Beijing

New Brunswick

- Beijing Concord College of Sino-Canada
- Canadian International School of Beijing

Nova Scotia

- Beijing No. 25 Middle School

==== Fujian ====
Ontario

- Canadian Trillium College (Quanzhou)

==== Guizhou ====
Nova Scotia

- Guiyang No. 1 High School

==== Guangdong ====
===== Guangzhou =====
Alberta

- Canadian International School of Guangzhou

British Columbia

- Guangzhou Huamei International School

Manitoba

- Clifford School

Nova Scotia

- English School attached to Guangdong University of Foreign Studies

Ontario

- Huamei-Bond International College

===== Jiangmen =====
Ontario

- Boren Sino-Canadian School

===== Shenzhen =====
New Brunswick

- International School of Nanshan Shenzhen
- International School of Sino-Canada (ISSC)
- Shenzhen (Nanshan) Concord College of Canada

Nova Scotia

- Shenzhen Tsinghua Experimental School

Ontario

- Oxstand-Bond International College

==== Hebei ====
Nova Scotia

- Xingtai No. 1 High School
- Handan No. 1 High School
- Middle School attached to Hebei Normal University - Shijiazhuang
- Tangshan No. 1 High School

==== Henan ====
Alberta

- International School of Qiushi

Nova Scotia

- Henan Experimental High School
- Luoyang No. 1 High School

==== Hubei ====
British Columbia

- Wuhan Maple Leaf Foreign Nationals School
- Wuhan Maple Leaf International School

==== Jiangsu ====
British Columbia

- Jiangsu Mudu Senior High School
- Nanjing Grand Canadian Academy
- Sino-Canada High School

Nova Scotia

- Soochow University High School

Ontario

- Canadian Trillium College (Nanjing Campus)
- Nanjing-Bond International College

==== Jilin ====
British Columbia

- Canada Changchun Shiyi Secondary School

Nova Scotia

- Jilin No. 1 High School
- Changchun Experimental High School

==== Jiangxi ====
Nova Scotia

- Nanchang No. 2 High School

==== Liaoning ====
British Columbia

- Dalian Maple Leaf International School

Nova Scotia

- Shenyang No. 2 High School

==== Shaanxi ====
Nova Scotia

- Tongchuan No. 1 High School

==== Shandong ====
British Columbia

- Canada Weifang Secondary School
- Canada Qingdao Secondary School
- Canada Taian Secondary School
- Canada Zibo #11 Secondary School

==== Shanghai ====
British Columbia

- Nanyang Model High School

Ontario

- Canadian Trillium College (Shanghai Campus)

==== Sichuan ====
British Columbia

- Canada Chengdu ShiShi Secondary School

Nova Scotia

- Chengdu Foreign Languages School

==== Tianjin ====
British Columbia

- Tianjin TEDA Maple Leaf International School

Ontario

- Yinghua - Bond International College

==== Xinjiang ====
Nova Scotia

- Karamay Senior High School

==== Zhejiang ====
British Columbia

- Canadian Secondary Wenzhou No. 22 Middle School
- Jiaxing Grand Canadian Academy

Ontario

- Canadian Trillium College (Jinhua Campus)

=== Hong Kong ===
Alberta

- Christian Alliance International School

Ontario

- Canadian International School (Hong Kong)
- Delia School of Canada

=== Japan ===
Alberta

- Kunimoto Alberta International School

British Columbia

- Bunka Suginami Canadian International School
- Osaka Gakugei Canadian International School

Manitoba

- Meitoku Gijuku School

Ontario

- Columbia International School

Prince Edward Island

- Canadian International School (Tokyo)

=== Macau ===
Alberta

- The International School of Macao

=== Malaysia ===
Ontario

- Sunway College Canadian International Matriculation Programme and Sunway International School
- Taylor's College International Canadian Pre-University Programme

=== Singapore ===
- Canadian International School (Singapore)

=== South Korea ===
British Columbia

- BC Collegiate Canada
- BIS Canada
- SIS Canada
- Westminster Canadian Academy

Manitoba

- Calvin Manitoba International School

=== Thailand ===
British Columbia

- British Columbia International School, Bangkok

Quebec

- Canadian International School of Thailand, Bangkok

== Europe ==
=== France ===
British Columbia

- Canadian Bilingual School of Paris

=== Italy ===
Ontario

- Canadian College Italy

=== Netherlands ===
Ontario

- AFNORTH International School

=== Switzerland ===
Ontario

- Neuchâtel Junior College

=== Turkey ===
Manitoba

- Kemer Canadian High School Programme

== Middle East ==
=== Egypt ===
British Columbia

- British Columbia Canadian International School

Manitoba

- Heritage International School

Ontario

- Canadian International School of Egypt

=== Qatar ===
Alberta

- Blyth Academy Qatar
- Qatar Canadian School

British Columbia

- Hayat Universal School

=== United Arab Emirates ===
Alberta

- Canadian International School (Abu Dhabi)
- Maplewood International School

Nova Scotia

- Abu Dhabi Grammar School
