= Thirteenth grade =

Educational year

Thirteenth grade, grade thirteen, or super senior year is the final year of secondary school in some jurisdictions. In some locales, receiving a high school diploma or equivalent is compulsory. In others, receiving a high school diploma is not required but may be a prerequisite to enrolling in certain post-secondary institutions. Students who are in thirteenth grade are usually 18–19 years old.

== Canada ==
The Ontario Academic Credit (OAC) (French: Cours préuniversitaire de l'Ontario or CPO) was the fifth year of secondary school education designed for students preparing for post-secondary education that existed in the province of Ontario, Canada. The OAC curriculum was codified by the Ontario Ministry of Education in Ontario Schools: Intermediate and Senior (OS: IS) and its revisions. The Ontario education system had five years of secondary education, the fifth year known as "grade 13" from 1921 to 1988. Grade 13 was replaced in 1984 by the OAC for students starting high school (grade 9). The OAC continued to act as a fifth year of secondary education until it was phased out in 2003.

In 2022, Steven Del Duca, leader of the Ontario Liberal Party, stated that, if elected, the party would reintroduce Grade 13, which would be optional for school boards. It would be available for at least four years.

== United States ==
Most jurisdictions in the United States require or offer only twelfth grade as the final year of secondary school. Some school districts in North Carolina offer a thirteenth grade. In North Carolina, early college high schools may provide 5 years, providing a grade 13.

== Israel ==
The educational plan for high school graduates who wish to become practical engineers prior to their mandatory army service is known as "Yud Gimel-Yud Daled" (י"ג-י"ד. lit. Thirteenth-Fourteenth grades) due to the study program lasting for two years (except for programs in civil engineering and architecture, which can last up to 3 years).

Preceded by Twelfth grade	Thirteenth grade ages 18–19	Succeeded by Higher education
