= List of schools in Quebec =

The following is an incomplete list of public schools in the Canadian province of Quebec.

== Primarie ==
| School name | Municipality | Region | School Board | Year Open |
|---|---|---|---|---|
| Everest Elementary School | Quebec City | Capitale-Nationale | Central Quebec School Board | |
| Ste-Foy Elementary School | Quebec City | Capitale-Nationale | Central Quebec School Board | |
| Holland Elementary School | Quebec City | Capitale-Nationale | Central Quebec School Board | |
| St. Vincent Elementary School | Quebec City | Capitale-Nationale | Central Quebec School Board | |
| Portneuf Elementary School | Cap-Santé | Capitale-Nationale | Central Quebec School Board | |
| Valcartier Elementary School | Saint-Gabriel-de-Valcartier | Capitale-Nationale | Central Quebec School Board | |
| Mauricie English Elementary School | Trois-Rivières | Mauricie | Central Quebec School Board | |
| Riverside Regional Elementary School | Jonquière | Saguenay–Lac-Saint-Jean | Central Quebec School Board | |
| École à l'Orée-des-Bois | Quebec, Quebec | Capitale-Nationale | Commission scolaire de la Capitale | |
| École Alexander-Wolff | Shannon | Capitale-Nationale | Commission scolaire de la Capitale | |
| École Amédée-Boutin | Quebec, Quebec | Capitale-Nationale | Commission scolaire de la Capitale | |
| École Anne-Hébert | Quebec, Quebec | Capitale-Nationale | Commission scolaire de la Capitale | |
| École d'éducation internationale Notre-Dame-des-Neiges | Quebec, Quebec | Capitale-Nationale | Commission scolaire de la Capitale | |
| École de Château-d'Eau | Quebec, Quebec | Capitale-Nationale | Commission scolaire de la Capitale | |
| École de l'Accueil | Quebec, Quebec | Capitale-Nationale | Commission scolaire de la Capitale | |
| École de l'Apprenti-Sage | Quebec, Quebec | Capitale-Nationale | Commission scolaire de la Capitale | |
| École de l'Arc-en-Ciel | Quebec, Quebec | Capitale-Nationale | Commission scolaire de la Capitale | |
| École de l'Aventure | Quebec, Quebec | Capitale-Nationale | Commission scolaire de la Capitale | |
| École de l'Escabelle (Pavillons A-B-C) | Quebec, Quebec | Capitale-Nationale | Commission scolaire de la Capitale | |
| École de La Chanterelle | Quebec, Quebec | Capitale-Nationale | Commission scolaire de la Capitale | |
| École de La Chaumière | Quebec, Quebec | Capitale-Nationale | Commission scolaire de la Capitale | |
| École de la Grande-Hermine | Quebec, Quebec | Capitale-Nationale | Commission scolaire de la Capitale | |
| École de la Mosaïque | Quebec, Quebec | Capitale-Nationale | Commission scolaire de la Capitale | |
| École de La Source | Quebec, Quebec | Capitale-Nationale | Commission scolaire de la Capitale | |
| École des Berges | Quebec, Quebec | Capitale-Nationale | Commission scolaire de la Capitale | |
| École des Explorateurs | Quebec, Quebec | Capitale-Nationale | Commission scolaire de la Capitale | |
| École des Grands-Saules (des Écrivains) | Quebec, Quebec | Capitale-Nationale | Commission scolaire de la Capitale | |
| École des Grands-Saules (Sainte-Monique) | Quebec, Quebec | Capitale-Nationale | Commission scolaire de la Capitale | |
| École des Jeunes-du-Monde (pavillon Bardy) | Quebec, Quebec | Capitale-Nationale | Commission scolaire de la Capitale | |
| École des Jeunes-du-Monde (pavillon Champfleury) | Quebec, Quebec | Capitale-Nationale | Commission scolaire de la Capitale | |
| École Dominique-Savio | Quebec, Quebec | Capitale-Nationale | Commission scolaire de la Capitale | |
| École du Beau-Séjour | Quebec, Quebec | Capitale-Nationale | Commission scolaire de la Capitale | |
| École du Buisson | Quebec, Quebec | Capitale-Nationale | Commission scolaire de la Capitale | |
| École Du Domaine | Quebec, Quebec | Capitale-Nationale | Commission scolaire de la Capitale | |
| École du Joli-Bois | Quebec, Quebec | Capitale-Nationale | Commission scolaire de la Capitale | |
| École du Val-Joli | Quebec, Quebec | Capitale-Nationale | Commission scolaire de la Capitale | |
| École du Vignoble | Quebec, Quebec | Capitale-Nationale | Commission scolaire de la Capitale | |
| École internationale de Saint-Sacrement | Quebec, Quebec | Capitale-Nationale | Commission scolaire de la Capitale | |
| École Jacques-Cartier | Quebec, Quebec | Capitale-Nationale | Commission scolaire de la Capitale | |
| École Jean-XXIII | Quebec, Quebec | Capitale-Nationale | Commission scolaire de la Capitale | |
| École Jules-Émond | Quebec, Quebec | Capitale-Nationale | Commission scolaire de la Capitale | |
| École L'Odyssée | Quebec, Quebec | Capitale-Nationale | Commission scolaire de la Capitale | |
| École Les Prés-Verts | Quebec, Quebec | Capitale-Nationale | Commission scolaire de la Capitale | |
| École Marguerite-Bourgeoys | Quebec, Quebec | Capitale-Nationale | Commission scolaire de la Capitale | |
| École Notre-Dame-du-Canada | Quebec, Quebec | Capitale-Nationale | Commission scolaire de la Capitale | |
| École Sacré-Coeur | Quebec, Quebec | Capitale-Nationale | Commission scolaire de la Capitale | |
| École Saint-Albert-le-Grand | Quebec, Quebec | Capitale-Nationale | Commission scolaire de la Capitale | |
| École Saint-Bernard | Quebec, Quebec | Capitale-Nationale | Commission scolaire de la Capitale | |
| École Saint-Claude | Quebec, Quebec | Capitale-Nationale | Commission scolaire de la Capitale | |
| École Saint-Denys-Garneau | Quebec, Quebec | Capitale-Nationale | Commission scolaire de la Capitale | |
| École Saint-Fidèle | Quebec, Quebec | Capitale-Nationale | Commission scolaire de la Capitale | |
| École Saint-Jean-Baptiste | Quebec, Quebec | Capitale-Nationale | Commission scolaire de la Capitale | |
| École Saint-Malo | Quebec, Quebec | Capitale-Nationale | Commission scolaire de la Capitale | |
| École Saint-Paul-Apôtre | Quebec, Quebec | Capitale-Nationale | Commission scolaire de la Capitale | |
| École Sainte-Odile | Quebec, Quebec | Capitale-Nationale | Commission scolaire de la Capitale | |
| École Sans-Frontière | Quebec, Quebec | Capitale-Nationale | Commission scolaire de la Capitale | |
| École Alphonse-Desjardins | Repentigny, Quebec | Lanaudière | Commission scolaire des Affluents | |
| École au Point-du-Jour | L'Assomption, Quebec | Lanaudière | Commission scolaire des Affluents | |
| École Aux 4 Vents | Mascouche, Quebec | Lanaudière | Commission scolaire des Affluents | |
| École aux-Quatre-Vents | Saint-Sulpice, Quebec | Lanaudière | Commission scolaire des Affluents | |
| École Bernard-Corbin | Terrebonne, Quebec | Lanaudière | Commission scolaire des Affluents | |
| École de la Sablière | Terrebonne, Quebec | Lanaudière | Commission scolaire des Affluents | |
| École des Hauts-Bois | Mascouche, Quebec | Lanaudière | Commission scolaire des Affluents | |
| École du Boisé | La Plaine, Quebec | Lanaudière | Commission scolaire des Affluents | |
| École du Geai-Bleu | La Plaine, Quebec | Lanaudière | Commission scolaire des Affluents | |
| École du Vieux-Chêne | Lachenaie, Quebec | Lanaudière | Commission scolaire des Affluents | |
| École Esther-Blondin | Terrebonne, Quebec | Lanaudière | Commission scolaire des Affluents | |
| École Coeur-Vaillant-Campanile | Québec, Quebec | Capitale-Nationale | Commission scolaire des Découvreurs | |
| École Coeur-Vaillant | Québec, Quebec | Capitale-Nationale | Commission scolaire des Découvreurs | |
| Des Hauts-Clochers – Pavillon Notre-Dame | L’Ancienne-Lorette | Capitale-Nationale | Commission scolaire des Découvreurs | |
| Des Hauts-Clochers – Pavillon Saint-Charles | L’Ancienne-Lorette | Capitale-Nationale | Commission scolaire des Découvreurs | |
| Pavillon Marguerite-Bourgeois | St-Augustin | Capitale-Nationale | Commission scolaire des Découvreurs | |
| Pavillon De La Salle | St-Augustin | Capitale-Nationale | Commission scolaire des Découvreurs | |
| École Notre-Dame-de-Foy | Québec, Quebec | Capitale-Nationale | Commission scolaire des Découvreurs | |
| École du Versant–Sainte-Geneviève | Québec, Quebec | Capitale-Nationale | Commission scolaire des Découvreurs | |
| École d’éducation internationale Filteau–Saint-Mathieu | Québec, Quebec | Capitale-Nationale | Commission scolaire des Découvreurs | |
| École Fernand-Seguin | Québec, Quebec | Capitale-Nationale | Commission scolaire des Découvreurs | |
| École Les Primevères | Québec, Quebec | Capitale-Nationale | Commission scolaire des Découvreurs | |
| École Jouvence | Québec, Quebec | Capitale-Nationale | Commission scolaire des Découvreurs | |
| École le Ruisselet | L'Ancienne-Lorette | Capitale-Nationale | Commission scolaire des Découvreurs | |
| École primaire Les Bocages | Saint-Augustin-de-Desmaures | Capitale-Nationale | Commission scolaire des Découvreurs | |
| École Les Sources | Québec, Quebec | Capitale-Nationale | Commission scolaire des Découvreurs | |
| École L’Arbrisseau | | Capitale-Nationale | Commission scolaire des Découvreurs | |
| École l’Étincelle | Québec, Quebec | Capitale-Nationale | Commission scolaire des Découvreurs | |
| École Trois-Saisons | Québec, Quebec | Capitale-Nationale | Commission scolaire des Découvreurs | |
| École Madeleine-Bergeron | Québec, Quebec | Capitale-Nationale | Commission scolaire des Découvreurs | |
| École Marguerite-d’Youville | Québec, Quebec | Capitale-Nationale | Commission scolaire des Découvreurs | |
| Saint-Louis-de-France I | Québec, Quebec | Capitale-Nationale | Commission scolaire des Découvreurs | |
| Saint-Louis-de-France II | Québec, Quebec | Capitale-Nationale | Commission scolaire des Découvreurs | |
| École St-Michel | Québec, Quebec | Capitale-Nationale | Commission scolaire des Découvreurs | |
| Saint-Yves | Québec, Quebec | Capitale-Nationale | Commission scolaire des Découvreurs | |
| École de l'Arc-en-Ciel | Québec, Quebec | Capitale-Nationale | Commission scolaire des Premières-Seigneuries | |
| École Beausoleil | Québec, Quebec | Capitale-Nationale | Commission scolaire des Premières-Seigneuries | |
| École du Boisé (du Boisé 1) | Québec, Quebec | Capitale-Nationale | Commission scolaire des Premières-Seigneuries | |
| École du Boisé (du Boisé 2) | Québec, Quebec | Capitale-Nationale | Commission scolaire des Premières-Seigneuries | |
| École du Bourg-Royal | Québec, Quebec | Capitale-Nationale | Commission scolaire des Premières-Seigneuries | |
| École du Cap-Soleil et Saint-Pierre (du Cap-Soleil) | Québec, Quebec | Capitale-Nationale | Commission scolaire des Premières-Seigneuries | |
| École du Cap-Soleil et Saint-Pierre (Saint-Pierre) | Québec, Quebec | Capitale-Nationale | Commission scolaire des Premières-Seigneuries | |
| École Chabot et de l'Oasis (Chabot) | Québec, Quebec | Capitale-Nationale | Commission scolaire des Premières-Seigneuries | |
| École Chabot et de l'Oasis (de l'Oasis) | Québec, Quebec | Capitale-Nationale | Commission scolaire des Premières-Seigneuries | |
| École du Châtelet | Québec, Quebec | Capitale-Nationale | Commission scolaire des Premières-Seigneuries | |
| École des Cimes | Québec, Quebec | Capitale-Nationale | Commission scolaire des Premières-Seigneuries | |
| École de l'Escalade (de l'Escalade 1) | Québec, Quebec | Capitale-Nationale | Commission scolaire des Premières-Seigneuries | |
| École de l'Escalade (de l'Escalade 2) | Québec, Quebec | Capitale-Nationale | Commission scolaire des Premières-Seigneuries | |
| École de l'Escale et du Plateau (de l'Escale) | Québec, Quebec | Capitale-Nationale | Commission scolaire des Premières-Seigneuries | |
| École de l'Escale et du Plateau (du Plateau) | Québec, Quebec | Capitale-Nationale | Commission scolaire des Premières-Seigneuries | |
| École de la Farandole | Québec, Quebec | Capitale-Nationale | Commission scolaire des Premières-Seigneuries | |
| École de la Fourmilière | Québec, Quebec | Capitale-Nationale | Commission scolaire des Premières-Seigneuries | |
| École Guillaume-Mathieu | Québec, Quebec | Capitale-Nationale | Commission scolaire des Premières-Seigneuries | |
| École de l'Harmonie (Saint-Édouard) | Québec, Quebec | Capitale-Nationale | Commission scolaire des Premières-Seigneuries | |
| École de l'Harmonie (Monseigneur-Robert) | Québec, Quebec | Capitale-Nationale | Commission scolaire des Premières-Seigneuries | |
| École Maria-Goretti | Québec, Quebec | Capitale-Nationale | Commission scolaire des Premières-Seigneuries | |
| École du Parc | Québec, Quebec | Capitale-Nationale | Commission scolaire des Premières-Seigneuries | |
| École du Parc-Orléans | Québec, Quebec | Capitale-Nationale | Commission scolaire des Premières-Seigneuries | |
| École de la Passerelle | Québec, Quebec | Capitale-Nationale | Commission scolaire des Premières-Seigneuries | |
| École de la Pléiade | Québec, Quebec | Capitale-Nationale | Commission scolaire des Premières-Seigneuries | |
| École de la Primerose | Québec, Quebec | Capitale-Nationale | Commission scolaire des Premières-Seigneuries | |
| École aux Quatre-Vents (aux Quatre-Vents 1) | Québec, Quebec | Capitale-Nationale | Commission scolaire des Premières-Seigneuries | |
| École aux Quatre-Vents (aux Quatre-Vents 2) | Québec, Quebec | Capitale-Nationale | Commission scolaire des Premières-Seigneuries | |
| École de la Ribambelle | Québec, Quebec | Capitale-Nationale | Commission scolaire des Premières-Seigneuries | |
| École du Rucher | Québec, Quebec | Capitale-Nationale | Commission scolaire des Premières-Seigneuries | |
| École de Saint-Michel | Québec, Quebec | Capitale-Nationale | Commission scolaire des Premières-Seigneuries | |
| École du Sous-Bois | Québec, Quebec | Capitale-Nationale | Commission scolaire des Premières-Seigneuries | |
| École optionnelle Yves-Prévost et des Loutres (opt. Yves-Prévost) | Québec, Quebec | Capitale-Nationale | Commission scolaire des Premières-Seigneuries | |
| École optionnelle Yves-Prévost et des Loutres (des Loutres) | Québec, Quebec | Capitale-Nationale | Commission scolaire des Premières-Seigneuries | |
| École Marie-Renouard | Québec, Quebec | Capitale-Nationale | Commission scolaire des Premières-Seigneuries | |
| École Montagnac | Lac-Beauport | Capitale-Nationale | Commission scolaire des Premières-Seigneuries | |
| École du Harfang-des-Neiges 1 | Stoneham-et-Tewkesbury | Capitale-Nationale | Commission scolaire des Premières-Seigneuries | |
| École du Harfang-des-Neiges 2 | Stoneham-et-Tewkesbury | Capitale-Nationale | Commission scolaire des Premières-Seigneuries | |
| École des Beaux-Prés et de la Pionnière (des Beaux-Prés) | Beaupré | Capitale-Nationale | Commission scolaire des Premières-Seigneuries | |
| École de l'Île d'Orléans (St-Pierre) | Île d'Orléans | Capitale-Nationale | Commission scolaire des Premières-Seigneuries | |
| École de l'Île d'Orléans (Saint-Laurent) | Île d'Orléans | Capitale-Nationale | Commission scolaire des Premières-Seigneuries | |
| École de l'Île d'Orléans (Sainte-Famille) | Île d'Orléans | Capitale-Nationale | Commission scolaire des Premières-Seigneuries | |
| École du Petit-Prince | L'Ange-Gardien | Capitale-Nationale | Commission scolaire des Premières-Seigneuries | |
| École du Trivent | Sainte-Brigitte-de-Laval | Capitale-Nationale | Commission scolaire des Premières-Seigneuries | |
| École des Beaux-Prés et de la Pionnière (de la Pionnière) | Saint-Joachim | Capitale-Nationale | Commission scolaire des Premières-Seigneuries | |
| École de la Châtelaine et de la Place-de-l'Éveil (de la Châtelaine) | Château-Richer | Capitale-Nationale | Commission scolaire des Premières-Seigneuries | |
| École de la Châtelaine et de la Place-de-l'Éveil (de la Place-de-l'Éveil) | Sainte-Anne-de-Beaupré | Capitale-Nationale | Commission scolaire des Premières-Seigneuries | |
| École de Boischatel (du Bois-Joli) | Boischatel | Capitale-Nationale | Commission scolaire des Premières-Seigneuries | |
| École de Boischatel (du Bocage) | Boischatel | Capitale-Nationale | Commission scolaire des Premières-Seigneuries | |
| École de Boischatel (Boréal) | Boischatel | Capitale-Nationale | Commission scolaire des Premières-Seigneuries | |
| École Caps-des-Neiges (Caps-des-Neiges I) | Saint-Ferréol-les-Neiges | Capitale-Nationale | Commission scolaire des Premières-Seigneuries | |
| École Caps-des-Neiges (Caps-des-Neiges II) | Saint-Tite-des-Caps | Capitale-Nationale | Commission scolaire des Premières-Seigneuries | |
| École Marguerite-d’Youville | La Malbaie | Capitale-Nationale | Commission scolaire de Charlevoix | |
| École Félix-Antoine-Savard | La Malbaie | Capitale-Nationale | Commission scolaire de Charlevoix | |
| École Marie-Victorin | Saint-Siméon | Capitale-Nationale | Commission scolaire de Charlevoix | |
| École Notre-Dame-Du-Bon-Conseil | La Malbaie | Capitale-Nationale | Commission scolaire de Charlevoix | |
| École Laure-Gaudreault | Clermont | Capitale-Nationale | Commission scolaire de Charlevoix | |
| Beau-Soleil | Saint-Aimé-des-Lacs | Capitale-Nationale | Commission scolaire de Charlevoix | |
| École Fernand-Saindon | Notre-Dame-des-Monts | Capitale-Nationale | Commission scolaire de Charlevoix | |
| École St-Pierre | L'Isle-aux-Coudres | Capitale-Nationale | Commission scolaire de Charlevoix | |
| École Marie-Reine | Saint-Hilarion | Capitale-Nationale | Commission scolaire de Charlevoix | |
| École Léonce-Boivin | Les Éboulements | Capitale-Nationale | Commission scolaire de Charlevoix | |
| École Notre-Dame-de-Lorette | Saint-Irénée | Capitale-Nationale | Commission scolaire de Charlevoix | |
| École Thomas-Tremblay | Baie-Saint-Paul | Capitale-Nationale | Commission scolaire de Charlevoix | |
| École Sir-Rodolphe-Forget | Baie-Saint-Paul | Capitale-Nationale | Commission scolaire de Charlevoix | |
| École St-François | Petite-Rivière-Saint-François | Capitale-Nationale | Commission scolaire de Charlevoix | |
| École Dominique-Savio | Saint-Urbain | Capitale-Nationale | Commission scolaire de Charlevoix | |
| École du Bon-Pasteur | Cap-Santé | Capitale-Nationale | Commission scolaire de Portneuf | |
| École du Phare | Deschambault | Capitale-Nationale | Commission scolaire de Portneuf | |
| École de la Saumonière | Donnacona | Capitale-Nationale | Commission scolaire de Portneuf | |
| École Saint-Charles-de-Grondines | Deschambault-Grondines | Capitale-Nationale | Commission scolaire de Portneuf | |
| École des Bourdons/Courval | Neuville | Capitale-Nationale | Commission scolaire de Portneuf | |
| École des Sentiers/de la Riveraine | Portneuf | Capitale-Nationale | Commission scolaire de Portneuf | |
| École du Perce-Neige | Pont-Rouge | Capitale-Nationale | Commission scolaire de Portneuf | |
| École Saint-Coeur-de-Marie | Rivière-à-Pierre | Capitale-Nationale | Commission scolaire de Portneuf | |
| École du Goéland | Saint-Alban | Capitale-Nationale | Commission scolaire de Portneuf | |
| École des Trois-Sources | Saint-Basile | Capitale-Nationale | Commission scolaire de Portneuf | |
| École du Bateau-Blanc | Saint-Casimir | Capitale-Nationale | Commission scolaire de Portneuf | |
| École Marie-du-Saint-Sacrement | Saint-Léonard | Capitale-Nationale | Commission scolaire de Portneuf | |
| École Sainte-Marie | St-Marc-des-Carrières | Capitale-Nationale | Commission scolaire de Portneuf | |
| École Marguerite-D’Youville/Saint-Joseph | St-Raymond | Capitale-Nationale | Commission scolaire de Portneuf | |
| École de la Morelle | St-Ubalde | Capitale-Nationale | Commission scolaire de Portneuf | |
| École primaire Académie Saint-Clément | Mont-Royal | Montreal | Commission scolaire Marguerite-Bourgeoys | |
| Académie Sainte-Anne | Dorval | Montreal | Commission scolaire Marguerite-Bourgeoys | |
| École primaire Beaconsfield (Beaconsfield) | Beaconsfield | Montreal | Commission scolaire Marguerite-Bourgeoys | |
| École primaire Beau-Séjour | Saint-Laurent, Montreal | Montreal | Commission scolaire Marguerite-Bourgeoys | |
| École primaire Bois-Franc-Aquarelle | Saint-Laurent, Montreal | Montreal | Commission scolaire Marguerite-Bourgeoys | |
| École primaire Cardinal-Léger | Saint-Laurent, Montreal | Montreal | Commission scolaire Marguerite-Bourgeoys | |
| École primaire Catherine-Soumillard | Lachine, Montreal | Montreal | Commission scolaire Marguerite-Bourgeoys | |
| École primaire Chanoine-Joseph-Théorêt | Verdun, Montreal | Montreal | Commission scolaire Marguerite-Bourgeoys | |
| École primaire de la Mosaïque | Côte-Saint-Luc | Montreal | Commission scolaire Marguerite-Bourgeoys | |
| École primaire des Amis-du-Monde | Côte-Saint-Luc | Montreal | Commission scolaire Marguerite-Bourgeoys | |
| École primaire des Berges-de-Lachine | Lachine, Montreal | Montreal | Commission scolaire Marguerite-Bourgeoys | |
| École primaire des Découvreurs | LaSalle, Montreal | Montreal | Commission scolaire Marguerite-Bourgeoys | |
| École primaire des Grands-Êtres | Saint-Laurent, Montreal | Montreal | Commission scolaire Marguerite-Bourgeoys | |
| École primaire Dollard-Des Ormeaux | Dollard-des-Ormeaux | Montreal | Commission scolaire Marguerite-Bourgeoys | |
| École primaire du Bois-de-Liesse | Dollard-des-Ormeaux | Montreal | Commission scolaire Marguerite-Bourgeoys | |
| École primaire du Bout-de-l'Isle | Sainte-anne-de-bellevue | Montreal | Commission scolaire Marguerite-Bourgeoys | |
| École primaire du Grand-Chêne | Pierrefonds-Roxboro, Montreal | Montreal | Commission scolaire Marguerite-Bourgeoys | |
| École primaire du Grand-Héron | Lasalle, Montreal | Montreal | Commission scolaire Marguerite-Bourgeoys | |
| École primaire du Petit-Collège | Lasalle, Montreal | Montreal | Commission scolaire Marguerite-Bourgeoys | |
| École primaire Édouard-Laurin | Saint-Laurent, Montreal | Montreal | Commission scolaire Marguerite-Bourgeoys | |
| École primaire Émile-Nelligan | Kirkland | Montreal | Commission scolaire Marguerite-Bourgeoys | |
| École primaire Enfants-du-Monde | Saint-Laurent, Montreal | Montreal | Commission scolaire Marguerite-Bourgeoys | |
| École primaire Enfant-Soleil | Saint-Laurent, Montreal | Montreal | Commission scolaire Marguerite-Bourgeoys | |
| École primaire Gentilly | Dorval | Montreal | Commission scolaire Marguerite-Bourgeoys | |
| École primaire Guy-Drummond | Outremont, Montreal | Montreal | Commission scolaire Marguerite-Bourgeoys | |
| École primaire Harfang-des-Neiges | Pierrefonds-Roxboro, Montreal | Montreal | Commission scolaire Marguerite-Bourgeoys | |
| École primaire Henri-Beaulieu | Saint-Laurent, Montreal | Montreal | Commission scolaire Marguerite-Bourgeoys | |
| École primaire Henri-Forest | Lasalle, Montreal | Montreal | Commission scolaire Marguerite-Bourgeoys | |
| École primaire Île-des-Soeurs | Verdun, Montreal | Montreal | Commission scolaire Marguerite-Bourgeoys | |
| École primaire Jacques-Bizard | L'île-Bizard/Sainte-Geneviève | Montreal | Commission scolaire Marguerite-Bourgeoys | |
| École primaire Jardin-des-Saints-Anges | Lachine, Montreal | Montreal | Commission scolaire Marguerite-Bourgeoys | |
| École primaire Jean-Grou | Saint-Laurent, Montreal | Montreal | Commission scolaire Marguerite-Bourgeoys | |
| École primaire Jonathan | Saint-Laurent, Montreal | Montreal | Commission scolaire Marguerite-Bourgeoys | |
| École primaire Jonathan-Wilson | L'île-Bizard/Sainte-Geneviève | Montreal | Commission scolaire Marguerite-Bourgeoys | |
| École primaire Joseph-Henrico | Baie d'urfé | Montreal | Commission scolaire Marguerite-Bourgeoys | |
| École primaire Katimavik-Hébert | Saint-Laurent, Montreal | Montreal | Commission scolaire Marguerite-Bourgeoys | |
| École primaire Lajoie | Outremont, Montreal | Montreal | Commission scolaire Marguerite-Bourgeoys | |
| École primaire Lalande | Pierrefonds-Roxboro, Montreal | Montreal | Commission scolaire Marguerite-Bourgeoys | |
| École primaire Laurendeau-Dunton | Lasalle, Montreal | Montreal | Commission scolaire Marguerite-Bourgeoys | |
| École primaire Laurentide | Saint-Laurent, Montreal | Montreal | Commission scolaire Marguerite-Bourgeoys | |
| École primaire L'Eau-Vive | Lasalle, Montreal | Montreal | Commission scolaire Marguerite-Bourgeoys | |
| École primaire Lévis-Sauvé | Verdun, Montreal | Montreal | Commission scolaire Marguerite-Bourgeoys | |
| École primaire Marguerite-Bourgeoys | Pointe-claire | Montreal | Commission scolaire Marguerite-Bourgeoys | |
| École primaire Martin-Bélanger | Lachine, Montreal | Montreal | Commission scolaire Marguerite-Bourgeoys | |
| École primaire Murielle-Dumont | Pierrefonds-Roxboro, Montreal | Montreal | Commission scolaire Marguerite-Bourgeoys | |
| École primaire Notre-Dame-de-la-Garde | Verdun, Montreal | Montreal | Commission scolaire Marguerite-Bourgeoys | |
| École primaire Notre-Dame-de-la-Paix | Verdun, Montreal | Montreal | Commission scolaire Marguerite-Bourgeoys | |
| École primaire Notre-Dame-de-Lourdes | Verdun, Montreal | Montreal | Commission scolaire Marguerite-Bourgeoys | |
| École primaire Notre-Dame-des-Rapides | Verdun, Montreal | Montreal | Commission scolaire Marguerite-Bourgeoys | |
| École primaire Notre-Dame-des-Sept-Douleurs | Verdun, Montreal | Montreal | Commission scolaire Marguerite-Bourgeoys | |
| École primaire Nouvelle-Querbes | Outremont, Montreal | Montreal | Commission scolaire Marguerite-Bourgeoys | |
| École primaire Paul-Jarry | Lachine, Montreal | Montreal | Commission scolaire Marguerite-Bourgeoys | |
| École primaire Perce-Neige | Pierrefonds-Roxboro, Montreal | Montreal | Commission scolaire Marguerite-Bourgeoys | |
| École primaire Philippe-Morin | Lachine, Montreal | Montreal | Commission scolaire Marguerite-Bourgeoys | |
| École primaire Pierre-Rémy | Lasalle, Montreal | Montreal | Commission scolaire Marguerite-Bourgeoys | |
| École primaire Pointe-Claire | Pointe-claire | Montreal | Commission scolaire Marguerite-Bourgeoys | |
| École primaire Saint-Clément | Mont-Royal | Montreal | Commission scolaire Marguerite-Bourgeoys | |
| École primaire Sainte-Catherine-Labouré | Lasalle, Montreal | Montreal | Commission scolaire Marguerite-Bourgeoys | |
| École primaire Sainte-Geneviève (Ouest) | L'île-Bizard/Sainte-Geneviève | Montreal | Commission scolaire Marguerite-Bourgeoys | |
| École primaire Sainte-Geneviève (Sud) | Lasalle, Montreal | Montreal | Commission scolaire Marguerite-Bourgeoys | |
| École primaire Saint-Gérard | Pierrefonds-Roxboro, Montreal | Montreal | Commission scolaire Marguerite-Bourgeoys | |
| École primaire Saint-Germain-d'Outremont | Outremont, Montreal | Montreal | Commission scolaire Marguerite-Bourgeoys | |
| École primaire Saint-Louis | Pointe-claire | Montreal | Commission scolaire Marguerite-Bourgeoys | |
| École primaire Saint-Luc | Dollard-des-ormeaux | Montreal | Commission scolaire Marguerite-Bourgeoys | |
| École primaire Saint-Rémi | Beaconsfield | Montreal | Commission scolaire Marguerite-Bourgeoys | |
| École primaire Terre-des-Jeunes | Lasalle, Montreal | Montreal | Commission scolaire Marguerite-Bourgeoys | |
| École primaire Très-Saint-Sacrement | Lachine, Montreal | Montreal | Commission scolaire Marguerite-Bourgeoys | |
| École primaire Victor-Thérien | Lachine, Montreal | | | |
| École Bois-Joli | Saguenay | Saguenay–Lac-Saint-Jean | Commission scolaire de la Jonquière | 1985 |
| École du Versant | Larouche | | Commission scolaire de la Jonquière | |
| École Internationale de la Mosaïque | | | Commission scolaire de la Jonquière | |
| École Marguerite-Belley | | | Commission scolaire de la Jonquière | |
| École Notre-Dame-de-l'Assomption | | | Commission scolaire de la Jonquière | |
| École Notre-Dame-du-Sourire | | | Commission scolaire de la Jonquière | |
| École Sacré-Coeur | | | Commission scolaire de la Jonquière | |
| École Saint-Charles | | | Commission scolaire de la Jonquière | |
| École Saint-Jean-Baptiste | | | Commission scolaire de la Jonquière | |
| École Saint-Jean | | | Commission scolaire de la Jonquière | |
| École Notre-Dame-du-Rosaire/Saint-Luc | | | Commission scolaire de la Jonquière | |
| École Sainte-Bernadette | | | Commission scolaire de la Jonquière | |
| École Sainte-Cécile | | | Commission scolaire de la Jonquière | |
| École Sainte-Lucie | | | Commission scolaire de la Jonquière | |
| École Sainte-Marie-Médiatrice | | | Commission scolaire de la Jonquière | |
| École Trefflé-Gauthier | | | Commission scolaire de la Jonquière | |
| L'école André-Gagnon | | | Commission scolaire des Rives-du-Saguenay | |
| École primaire Antoine-De Saint-Exupéry | | | Commission scolaire des Rives-du-Saguenay | 1950 |
| École De La Pulperie | | | Commission scolaire des Rives-du-Saguenay | |
| École des Jolis-Prés | | | Commission scolaire des Rives-du-Saguenay | |
| École Notre-Dame | | | Commission scolaire des Rives-du-Saguenay | |
| École des Quatre-Vents | | | Commission scolaire des Rives-du-Saguenay | |
| Du Vallon | | | Commission scolaire des Rives-du-Saguenay | |
| École Félix-Antoine-Savard | | | Commission scolaire des Rives-du-Saguenay | |
| École Primaire La Source | | | Commission scolaire des Rives-du-Saguenay | |
| École Primaire Jean-Fortin | | | Commission scolaire des Rives-du-Saguenay | |
| École Primaire La Carrière | | | Commission scolaire des Rives-du-Saguenay | |
| École le Roseau | | | Commission scolaire des Rives-du-Saguenay | |
| École L'Horizon | | | Commission scolaire des Rives-du-Saguenay | |
| Marie-Médiatrice | | | Commission scolaire des Rives-du-Saguenay | |
| Médéric-Gravel | | | Commission scolaire des Rives-du-Saguenay | |
| École Primaire Mont-Valin | | | Commission scolaire des Rives-du-Saguenay | |
| École Notre-Dame-du-Rosaire | | | Commission scolaire des Rives-du-Saguenay | |
| Saint-Antoine | | | Commission scolaire des Rives-du-Saguenay | |
| Saint-Coeur-de-Marie | | | Commission scolaire des Rives-du-Saguenay | |
| Saint-David | | | Commission scolaire des Rives-du-Saguenay | |
| L'école Saint-Isidore et Saint-Denis | | | Commission scolaire des Rives-du-Saguenay | |
| École Saint-Félix | | | Commission scolaire des Rives-du-Saguenay | |
| École Primaire Saint-Gabriel-Lalemant | | | Commission scolaire des Rives-du-Saguenay | |
| Saint-Joseph | | | Commission scolaire des Rives-du-Saguenay | |
| École Primaire Sainte-Bernadette | | | Commission scolaire des Rives-du-Saguenay | |
| École primaire Sainte-Claire | | | Commission scolaire des Rives-du-Saguenay | |
| École Sainte-Rose | | | Commission scolaire des Rives-du-Saguenay | |
| Sainte-Thérèse | | | Commission scolaire des Rives-du-Saguenay | |
| École Primaire Vanier | | | Commission scolaire des Rives-du-Saguenay | |
| École Bon-Pasteur | | | Commission scolaire du Lac-Saint-Jean | |
| École Garnier | | | Commission scolaire du Lac-Saint-Jean | |
| École Maria | | | Commission scolaire du Lac-Saint-Jean | |
| École Notre-Dame-de-Lorette | | | Commission scolaire du Lac-Saint-Jean | |
| École Notre-Dame-du-Rosaire | | | Commission scolaire du Lac-Saint-Jean | |
| École Sainte-Hélène | | | Commission scolaire du Lac-Saint-Jean | |
| École Saint-Léon | | | Commission scolaire du Lac-Saint-Jean | |
| École Albert-Naud | | | Commission scolaire du Lac-Saint-Jean | |
| École Notre-Dame | | | Commission scolaire du Lac-Saint-Jean | |
| École Saint-Joseph | | | Commission scolaire du Lac-Saint-Jean | |
| École Saint-Julien | | | Commission scolaire du Lac-Saint-Jean | |
| École Saint-Pierre | | | Commission scolaire du Lac-Saint-Jean | |
| École Saint-Sacrement | | | Commission scolaire du Lac-Saint-Jean | |
| École du Bon conseil | | | Commission scolaire du Lac-Saint-Jean | |
| École Jean XXIII | | | Commission scolaire du Lac-Saint-Jean | |
| École Mgr-Victor | | | Commission scolaire du Lac-Saint-Jean | |
| École Saint-Antoine | | | Commission scolaire du Lac-Saint-Jean | |
| École primaire Saint-Bruno | | | Commission scolaire du Lac-Saint-Jean | |
| École Saint-Gérard | | | Commission scolaire du Lac-Saint-Jean | |
| École Saint-Joseph | | | Commission scolaire du Lac-Saint-Jean | |
| École des Deux-Lacs | | | Commission scolaire du Pays-des-Bleuets | |
| École Hébert | | | Commission scolaire du Pays-des-Bleuets | |
| École Jean XXIII | | | Commission scolaire du Pays-des-Bleuets | |
| École Jeanne-Mance | | | Commission scolaire du Pays-des-Bleuets | |
| École Sainte-Thérèse | | | Commission scolaire du Pays-des-Bleuets | |
| École Jolivent | | | Commission scolaire du Pays-des-Bleuets | |
| École La Source | | | Commission scolaire du Pays-des-Bleuets | |
| École L'Arbrisseau | | | Commission scolaire du Pays-des-Bleuets | |
| École Les Prés Verts | | | Commission scolaire du Pays-des-Bleuets | |
| École Maria-Goretti | | | Commission scolaire du Pays-des-Bleuets | |
| École Mgr Bluteau | | | Commission scolaire du Pays-des-Bleuets | |
| École Notre-Dame | | | Commission scolaire du Pays-des-Bleuets | |
| École Notre-Dame-de-Lourdes | | | Commission scolaire du Pays-des-Bleuets | |
| École Notre-Dame-des-Anges | | | Commission scolaire du Pays-des-Bleuets | |
| École Pie XII | | | Commission scolaire du Pays-des-Bleuets | |
| École Sacré-Coeur | | | Commission scolaire du Pays-des-Bleuets | |
| École Sainte-Hedwidge | | | Commission scolaire du Pays-des-Bleuets | |
| École Sainte-Lucie | | | Commission scolaire du Pays-des-Bleuets | |
| École Sainte-Marie | | | Commission scolaire du Pays-des-Bleuets | |
| École Saint-Louis-de-Gonzague | | | Commission scolaire du Pays-des-Bleuets | |
| École Saint-Lucien | | | Commission scolaire du Pays-des-Bleuets | |
| École Benoît-Duhamel | | | Commission scolaire du Pays-des-Bleuets | |
| École Boisjoli | | | Commission scolaire du Pays-des-Bleuets | |
| École Bon-Pasteur | | | Commission scolaire du Pays-des-Bleuets | |
| École Carrefour Étudiant | | | Commission scolaire du Pays-des-Bleuets | |
| École Assomption | Val-d'Espoir | Gaspésie–Îles-de-la-Madeleine | Commission scolaire René-Lévesque | |
| École aux Mille-Ressources | Saint-Alphonse | Gaspésie–Îles-de-la-Madeleine | Commission scolaire René-Lévesque | |
| École Bon-Pasteur | Grande-Rivière | Gaspésie–Îles-de-la-Madeleine | Commission scolaire René-Lévesque | |
| École Bon-Pasteur | Sainte-Thérèse | Gaspésie–Îles-de-la-Madeleine | Commission scolaire René-Lévesque | |
| École Bourg | Carleton-sur-Mer | Gaspésie–Îles-de-la-Madeleine | Commission scolaire René-Lévesque | |
| École Cap Beau-Soleil | Caplan | Gaspésie–Îles-de-la-Madeleine | Commission scolaire René-Lévesque | |
| École des Audomarois | Saint-Omer | Gaspésie–Îles-de-la-Madeleine | Commission scolaire René-Lévesque | |
| École des Découvertes | Saint-Siméon | Gaspésie–Îles-de-la-Madeleine | Commission scolaire René-Lévesque | |
| École des Quatre-Temps | Nouvelle | Gaspésie–Îles-de-la-Madeleine | Commission scolaire René-Lévesque | |
| École du Plateau Saint-François | Saint-François-d’Assise | Gaspésie–Îles-de-la-Madeleine | Commission scolaire René-Lévesque | |
| École François-Thibault | Bonaventure | Gaspésie–Îles-de-la-Madeleine | Commission scolaire René-Lévesque | |
| École La Relève | Saint-Elzéar | Gaspésie–Îles-de-la-Madeleine | Commission scolaire René-Lévesque | |
| École La Source | Paspébiac | Gaspésie–Îles-de-la-Madeleine | Commission scolaire René-Lévesque | |
| École Le Phare | Port-Daniel | Gaspésie–Îles-de-la-Madeleine | Commission scolaire René-Lévesque | |
| École Père-Pacifique | Pointe-à-la-Croix | Gaspésie–Îles-de-la-Madeleine | Commission scolaire René-Lévesque | |
| École Sacré-Cœur | Newport | Gaspésie–Îles-de-la-Madeleine | Commission scolaire René-Lévesque | |
| École Saint-Bernard | Gascons | Gaspésie–Îles-de-la-Madeleine | Commission scolaire René-Lévesque | |
| École Saint-Donat | Maria | Gaspésie–Îles-de-la-Madeleine | Commission scolaire René-Lévesque | |
| École Sainte-Marie | Cap d’Espoir | Gaspésie–Îles-de-la-Madeleine | Commission scolaire René-Lévesque | |
| École Saint-Joseph | Chandler | Gaspésie–Îles-de-la-Madeleine | Commission scolaire René-Lévesque | |
| École Saint-Paul | Pabos | Gaspésie–Îles-de-la-Madeleine | Commission scolaire René-Lévesque | |
| École Notre-Dame-du-Sacré-Coeur | Grande-Entrée | Gaspésie–Îles-de-la-Madeleine | Commission scolaire des Îles | |
| École Centrale | Havre-aux-Maisons | Gaspésie–Îles-de-la-Madeleine | Commission scolaire des Îles | |
| École Stella-Maris | Fatima | Gaspésie–Îles-de-la-Madeleine | Commission scolaire des Îles | |
| École Saint-Pierre | L'Étang-du-Nord | Gaspésie–Îles-de-la-Madeleine | Commission scolaire des Îles | |
| École Aux Iris | Bassin | Gaspésie–Îles-de-la-Madeleine | Commission scolaire des Îles | |
| Aux Quatre-Vents | Rivière-au-Renard | Gaspésie–Îles-de-la-Madeleine | Commission scolaire des Chic-Chocs | |
| De l'Anse | Sainte-Anne-des-Monts | Gaspésie–Îles-de-la-Madeleine | Commission scolaire des Chic-Chocs | |
| Des Bois-et-Marées | Sainte-Anne-des-Monts | Gaspésie–Îles-de-la-Madeleine | Commission scolaire des Chic-Chocs | |
| Du P'tit-Bonheur | Grande-Vallée | Gaspésie–Îles-de-la-Madeleine | Commission scolaire des Chic-Chocs | |
| Notre-Dame | Cloridorme | Gaspésie–Îles-de-la-Madeleine | Commission scolaire des Chic-Chocs | |
| Notre-Dame-de-Liesse | Saint-Georges-de-Malbaie | Gaspésie–Îles-de-la-Madeleine | Commission scolaire des Chic-Chocs | |
| Notre-Dame-des-Neiges | Marsoui | Gaspésie–Îles-de-la-Madeleine | Commission scolaire des Chic-Chocs | |
| École Notre-Dame-du-Sacré-Coeur | Fontenelle | Gaspésie–Îles-de-la-Madeleine | Commission scolaire des Chic-Chocs | |
| Saint-Antoine | Gros-Morne | Gaspésie–Îles-de-la-Madeleine | Commission scolaire des Chic-Chocs | |
| Saint-Joseph-Alban | Anse-au-Griffon | Gaspésie–Îles-de-la-Madeleine | Commission scolaire des Chic-Chocs | |
| Saint-Norbert | Cap-Chat | Gaspésie–Îles-de-la-Madeleine | Commission scolaire des Chic-Chocs | |
| Saint-Paul | Saint-Maurice-de-l'Échouerie | Gaspésie–Îles-de-la-Madeleine | Commission scolaire des Chic-Chocs | |
| Saint-Rosaire et de la Découverte | Gaspé | Gaspésie–Îles-de-la-Madeleine | Commission scolaire des Chic-Chocs | |
| Belle Anse Elementary | Barachois | Gaspésie–Îles-de-la-Madeleine | Eastern Shores School Board | |
| Fermont | Fermont | Gaspésie–Îles-de-la-Madeleine | Eastern Shores School Board | |
| Flemming Elementary | Sept-Iles | Gaspésie–Îles-de-la-Madeleine | Eastern Shores School Board | |
| Gaspe Elementary | Gaspe | Gaspésie–Îles-de-la-Madeleine | Eastern Shores School Board | |
| Shigawake - Port Daniel School | Shigawake | Gaspésie–Îles-de-la-Madeleine | Eastern Shores School Board | |
| St. Patrick / St. Joseph | Chandler | Gaspésie–Îles-de-la-Madeleine | Eastern Shores School Board | |

== Dual primary and secondary schools ==
| School name | Municipality | Region | School Board | Year Open |
|---|---|---|---|---|
| École régionale des Quatre-Saisons | Quebec, Quebec | Capitale-Nationale | Commission scolaire de la Capitale | |
| École Dollard-des-Ormeaux | Shannon | Capitale-Nationale | Central Quebec School Board | |
| St. Patrick Elementary School | Thetford Mines | Chaudière-Appalaches | Central Quebec School Board | |
| La Tuque High School | La Tuque | Mauricie | Central Quebec School Board | |
| MacLean Memorial School | Chibougamau | Nord-du-Québec | Central Quebec School Board | |
| Jimmy Sandy Memorial School | Kawawachikamach | Côte-Nord | Central Quebec School Board | |
| Shawinigan High School | Shawinigan | Mauricie | Central Quebec School Board | |
| École primaire et secondaire Fréchette | | | Commission scolaire des Rives-du-Saguenay | |
| École des Deux-Rivières | Matapédia | Gaspésie–Îles-de-la-Madeleine | Commission scolaire René-Lévesque | |
| École Le Bois-Vivant | New Richmond | Gaspésie–Îles-de-la-Madeleine | Commission scolaire René-Lévesque | |
| Des Prospecteurs | Murdochville | Gaspésie–Îles-de-la-Madeleine | Commission scolaire des Chic-Chocs | |
| Gabriel-Le Courtois | Sainte-Anne-des-Monts | Gaspésie–Îles-de-la-Madeleine | Commission scolaire des Chic-Chocs | |
| Saint-Maxime | Mont-Louis | Gaspésie–Îles-de-la-Madeleine | Commission scolaire des Chic-Chocs | |
| Baie Comeau High School | Baie-Comeau | Gaspésie–Îles-de-la-Madeleine | Eastern Shores School Board | |
| Entry Island | Entry Island | Gaspésie–Îles-de-la-Madeleine | Eastern Shores School Board | |
| Escuminac Intermediate | Escuminac | Gaspésie–Îles-de-la-Madeleine | Eastern Shores School Board | |
| Grosse Isle School | Grosse Isle | Gaspésie–Îles-de-la-Madeleine | Eastern Shores School Board | |
| Metis Beach School | Metis-sur-Mer | Gaspésie–Îles-de-la-Madeleine | Eastern Shores School Board | |
| New Carlisle High | New Carlisle | Gaspésie–Îles-de-la-Madeleine | Eastern Shores School Board | |
| New Richmond High | New Richmond | Gaspésie–Îles-de-la-Madeleine | Eastern Shores School Board | |
| Riverview | Port-Cartier | Gaspésie–Îles-de-la-Madeleine | Eastern Shores School Board | |

== Secondary ==
| School name | Municipality | Region | School Board | Year Open |
|---|---|---|---|---|
| Quebec High School | Quebec City | Capitale-Nationale | Central Quebec School Board | 1804 |
| St. Patrick's High School | Quebec City | Capitale-Nationale | Central Quebec School Board | |
| Three Rivers Academy | Trois-Rivières | Mauricie | Central Quebec School Board | |
| Riverside Regional High School | Jonquière | Saguenay–Lac-Saint-Jean | Central Quebec School Board | 1997 |
| A.S. Johnson Memorial School | Thetford Mines | Chaudière-Appalaches | Central Quebec School Board | |
| Centre éducatif Saint-Aubin | Baie Saint-Paul | Capitale-Nationale | Commission scolaire de Charlevoix | |
| École secondaire du Plateau | La Malbaie | Capitale-Nationale | Commission scolaire de Charlevoix | |
| École St-Pierre | L'Isle-aux-Coudres | Capitale-Nationale | Commission scolaire de Charlevoix | |
| École Boudreau | Quebec City | Capitale-Nationale | Commission scolaire de la Capitale | |
| École Cardinal-Roy | Quebec City | Capitale-Nationale | Commission scolaire de la Capitale | |
| École Jean-de-Brébeuf | Quebec City | Capitale-Nationale | Commission scolaire de la Capitale | |
| École Joseph-François-Perrault | Quebec City | Capitale-Nationale | Commission scolaire de la Capitale | |
| École L'Odyssée | Quebec City | Capitale-Nationale | Commission scolaire de la Capitale | |
| École Saint-Denys-Garneau | Sainte-Catherine-de-la-Jacques-Cartier | Capitale-Nationale | Commission scolaire de la Capitale | |
| École secondaire de la Cité | Quebec City | Capitale-Nationale | Commission scolaire de la Capitale | |
| École secondaire de Neufchâtel | Quebec City | Capitale-Nationale | Commission scolaire de la Capitale | |
| École secondaire La Camaradière | Quebec City | Capitale-Nationale | Commission scolaire de la Capitale | |
| École secondaire Roger-Comtois | Quebec City | Capitale-Nationale | Commission scolaire de la Capitale | |
| École secondaire Vanier | Quebec City | Capitale-Nationale | Commission scolaire de la Capitale | |
| École secondaire De Rochebelle | Quebec City | Capitale-Nationale | Commission scolaire des Découvreurs | |
| Pavillon Laure-Gaudreault | St-Augustin | Capitale-Nationale | Commission scolaire des Découvreurs | |
| Polyvalente de L’Ancienne-Lorette | L’ancienne-Lorette | Capitale-Nationale | Commission scolaire des Découvreurs | |
| École secondaire des Sentiers | Quebec City | Capitale-Nationale | Commission scolaire des Premières-Seigneuries | |
| École secondaire de la Courvilloise | Quebec City | Capitale-Nationale | Commission scolaire des Premières-Seigneuries | |
| Académie Sainte-Marie | Quebec City | Capitale-Nationale | Commission scolaire des Premières-Seigneuries | |
| École secondaire Le Sommet | Quebec City | Capitale-Nationale | Commission scolaire des Premières-Seigneuries | |
| Polyvalente de Charlesbourg | Quebec City | Capitale-Nationale | Commission scolaire des Premières-Seigneuries | |
| École secondaire Samuel-De Champlain | Quebec City | Capitale-Nationale | Commission scolaire des Premières-Seigneuries | |
| École secondaire de la Seigneurie | Quebec City | Capitale-Nationale | Commission scolaire des Premières-Seigneuries | |
| École secondaire de Donnacona | Donnacona | Capitale-Nationale | Commission scolaire de Portneuf | |
| École secondaire Louis-Jobin | Saint-Raymond | Capitale-Nationale | Commission scolaire de Portneuf | |
| École secondaire de Saint-Marc | St-Marc-des-Carrières | Capitale-Nationale | Commission scolaire de Portneuf | |
| École secondaire Cavelier-De LaSalle | LaSalle, Montreal | Montreal | Commission scolaire Marguerite-Bourgeoys | 1964 |
| École secondaire Dalbé-Viau | Lachine, Montreal | Montreal | Commission scolaire Marguerite-Bourgeoys | |
| École secondaire des Sources | Dollard-des-Ormeaux | Montreal | Commission scolaire Marguerite-Bourgeoys | |
| École secondaire Dorval-Jean-XXIII | Dorval | Montreal | Commission scolaire Marguerite-Bourgeoys | |
| École secondaire Félix-Leclerc | Pointe-Claire | Montreal | Commission scolaire Marguerite-Bourgeoys | |
| École secondaire Massey-Vanier | Cowansville | Montérégie | Commission scolaire du Val-Des-Cerfs | 1969 |
| École secondaire Monseigneur-Richard | Verdun, Montreal | Montreal | Commission scolaire Marguerite-Bourgeoys | |
| École secondaire Mont-Royal | Mont-Royal | Montreal | Commission scolaire Marguerite-Bourgeoys | |
| École secondaire Paul-Gérin-Lajoie-d'Outremont | Outremont, Montreal | Montreal | Commission scolaire Marguerite-Bourgeoys | |
| École secondaire Pierre-Laporte | Mont-Royal | Montreal | Commission scolaire Marguerite-Bourgeoys | |
| École secondaire Saint-Georges | Senneville | Montreal | Commission scolaire Marguerite-Bourgeoys | |
| École secondaire Saint-Laurent | Saint-Laurent, Montreal | | | |
| École polyvalente Arvida | | | Commission scolaire de la Jonquière | |
| École secondaire Kénogami | | | Commission scolaire de la Jonquière | |
| École polyvalente Jonquière | | | Commission scolaire de la Jonquière | |
| École secondaire Charles-Gravel | | | Commission scolaire des Rives-du-Saguenay | |
| École secondaire de L'Odyssée Lafontaine | | | Commission scolaire des Rives-du-Saguenay | |
| École secondaire De L'Odyssée/Dominique-Racine | | | Commission scolaire des Rives-du-Saguenay | |
| École secondaire des Grandes-Marées | | | Commission scolaire des Rives-du-Saguenay | |
| Maison Familiale Rurale | | | Commission scolaire des Rives-du-Saguenay | |
| École Jean-Gauthier | | | Commission scolaire du Lac-Saint-Jean | |
| Pavillon Wilbrod-Dufour | | | Commission scolaire du Lac-Saint-Jean | |
| École secondaire Camille-Lavoie | | | Commission scolaire du Lac-Saint-Jean | |
| École secondaire Curé-Hébert | | | Commission scolaire du Lac-Saint-Jean | |
| Cité étudiante Roberval | | | Commission scolaire du Lac-Saint-Jean | |
| Polyvalente de Normandin | | | Commission scolaire du Lac-Saint-Jean | |
| Polyvalente des Quatre-Vents | | | Commission scolaire du Lac-Saint-Jean | |
| Polyvalente Jean-Dolbeau | | | Commission scolaire du Lac-Saint-Jean | |
| École secondaire Des Chutes | | | Commission scolaire du Lac-Saint-Jean | |
| École Antoine-Bernard | Carleton-sur-Mer | Gaspésie–Îles-de-la-Madeleine | Commission scolaire René-Lévesque | |
| École aux Quatre-Vents | Bonaventure | Gaspésie–Îles-de-la-Madeleine | Commission scolaire René-Lévesque | |
| École polyvalente Mgr Sévigny | Chandler | Gaspésie–Îles-de-la-Madeleine | Commission scolaire René-Lévesque | |
| École secondaire du Littoral | Grande-Rivière | Gaspésie–Îles-de-la-Madeleine | Commission scolaire René-Lévesque | |
| Polyvalente de Paspébiac | Paspébiac | Gaspésie–Îles-de-la-Madeleine | Commission scolaire René-Lévesque | |
| École Polyvalente des Îles | L'Étang-du-Nord | Gaspésie–Îles-de-la-Madeleine | Commission scolaire des Îles | |
| Antoine-Roy | Rivière-au-Renard | Gaspésie–Îles-de-la-Madeleine | Commission scolaire des Chic-Chocs | |
| C.-E.-Pouliot | Gaspé | Gaspésie–Îles-de-la-Madeleine | Commission scolaire des Chic-Chocs | |
| De l'Escabelle | Cap-Chat | Gaspésie–Îles-de-la-Madeleine | Commission scolaire des Chic-Chocs | |
| Esdras-Minville | Grande-Vallée | Gaspésie–Îles-de-la-Madeleine | Commission scolaire des Chic-Chocs | |
| Evergreen High School | Chandler | Gaspésie–Îles-de-la-Madeleine | Eastern Shores School Board | |
| Gaspe Polyvalente (C.E. Pouliot) | Gaspe | Gaspésie–Îles-de-la-Madeleine | Eastern Shores School Board | |
| Queen Elizabeth High | Sept-Iles | Gaspésie–Îles-de-la-Madeleine | Eastern Shores School Board | |
| Nouvelle-Ère | Aylmer | Gatineau | Centre de services scolaire des Portages-de-l'Outaouais | |
| Grande-Rivières | Aylmer | Gatineau | Centre de services scolaire des Portages-de-l'Outaouais | |
| La Cité | Aylmer | Gatineau | Centre de services scolaire des Portages-de-l'Outaouais | |
