= Commission des écoles catholiques de Québec =

Roman Catholic school district in Quebec, Canada

Commission des écoles catholiques de Québec (C.É.C.Q. "Quebec Catholic School Commission") was a Roman Catholic school district which operated schools in Quebec City and Vanier, Quebec.

It was first established in 1846. Despite being annexed into Quebec City, Charlesbourg Ouest, Duberger les Saules, and Neufchâtel did not join CECQ. It was abolished in 1998. Now Commission scolaire de la Capitale operates secular francophone schools and Central Quebec School Board operates secular anglophone ones.

== Schools ==
Secondary:

- St. Patrick's High School - the Anglophone secondary
- École Joseph-François-Perrault
- École Cardinal-Roy
- École Jean-de-Brébeuf (Sec. 3–5)
- École Boudreau
- École Vanier
- École Notre-Dame-de-Roc-Amadour (Sec. 1–2)
- École Marie-de-l'Incarnation (sec. 1–2)
- Centre de formation en entreprise et récupération (CFER)
- Centre Jeunesse-Atout
- Hôtel-Dieu-du-Sacré-Coeur (hospital setting)

Primary:

- École Anne-Hébert
- École Chanoine-Côté
- École Dominique-Savio
- École Marguerite Bourgeoys
- École Notre-Dame-du-Canada
- École Sacré-Coeur
- École Stadacona
- École St-Albert-le-Grand
- École St-Fidèle
- École St-François d'Assise
- École St-Jean-Baptiste
- École St-Malo
- École St-Maurice
- École St-Paul-Apôtre
- École St-Pie X (1st cycle)
- École St-Pie X (2nd cycle)
- École St-Roch
- École St-Sacrement
- École Ste-Odile
- Hôtel-Dieu-du-Sacré-Coeur
