= Couchepaganiche East River =

River in Quebec, Canada

- Location within Quebec

Location
- Country: Canada
- Province: Quebec
- Region: Saguenay-Lac-Saint-Jean
- Regional County Municipality: Lac-Saint-Jean-Est Regional County Municipality
- Municipalities: Métabetchouan–Lac-à-la-Croix

Physical characteristics
- Source: Little unidentified lake
  - location: Métabetchouan–Lac-à-la-Croix
  - coordinates: 48.30126°N 71.84038°W
  - elevation: 400
- Mouth: Couchepaganiche River
  - location: Métabetchouan–Lac-à-la-Croix
  - coordinates: 48.39472°N 71.84°W
  - elevation: 133 m (436 ft)
- Length: 14.3 km (8.9 mi)
- Discharge
  - location: Métabetchouan–Lac-à-la-Croix

The Couchepaganiche East River is a tributary of the Couchepaganiche River, flowing in the municipality of Métabetchouan–Lac-à-la-Croix, in the Lac-Saint-Jean-Est Regional County Municipality, in the administrative region of Saguenay–Lac-Saint-Jean, in the province of Quebec, in Canada.

The lower part of the Couchepaganiche East River valley is served indirectly by the route 169 which runs along the southeast shore of lac Saint-Jean. This valley is also served by some secondary forest roads, especially for forestry and recreational tourism activities.

Forestry and agriculture are the main economic activities in this valley; recreational tourism, second.

The surface of the Couchepaganiche East River is usually frozen from the beginning of December to the end of March, however the safe circulation on the ice is generally made from mid-December to mid-March.

== Geography ==
The main watersheds adjacent to the Couchepaganiche East River are:

- north side: Couchepaganiche River, Lac Saint-Jean;
- east side: la Belle Rivière, Bédard River, Petite rivière Bédard, Saguenay River;
- south side: lac de la Belle Rivière, Belle Rivière, Aulnaies river, Métabetchouane River;
- west side: Couchepaganiche river, Métabetchouane River, Lac Saint-Jean.

The Couchepaganiche East river originates from an unidentified lake (length: 0.2 km (0.12 mi); altitude: 400 m (1,300 ft)) in a forest area, located south of the Montagne des Trois Round peaks. This source is located at:

- 5.8 km (3.6 mi) north-west of lac de la Belle Rivière;
- 10.2 km (6.3 mi) north-east of the Métabetchouane River;
- 10.5 km (6.5 mi) south-east of the confluence of the Couchepaganiche East and Couchepaganiche rivers;
- 14.8 km (9.2 mi) south-east of the confluence of the Couchepaganiche River and Lac Saint-Jean;
- 30.5 km (19.0 mi) south of downtown Alma.

From its source, the Couchepaganiche East river flows over 14.3 km (8.9 mi) with a drop of 267 m (876 ft) entirely in forest and agricultural zone, according to the following segments:

- 1.2 km (0.75 mi) north across a swamp area to a bend in the south of the Three Peaks Mountain;
- 4.6 km (2.9 mi) to the north, forming a large curve towards the west to bypass the Raven Mountain, up to the outlet (coming from the south) of Lake Estaire;
- 6.0 km (3.7 mi) to the north in a deep valley at the start of the segment, collecting the discharge (coming from the east) from Lac des Passes, then entering agricultural land where the course winds, until 'at the chemin du 4e rang;
- 2.5 km (1.6 mi) north in an agricultural valley, meandering and cutting the path of the 3rd range West, to its mouth.

The Couchepaganiche East river flows into a bend on the south bank of the Couchepaganiche River, just north of the 3rd range West road. This confluence is located at:

- 4.6 km (2.9 mi) south-east of the confluence of the Couchepaganiche River and Lac Saint-Jean;
- 8.4 km (5.2 mi) east of the village center of Desbiens;
- 14.8 km (9.2 mi) north-west of lac de la Belle Rivière;
- 21.8 km (13.5 mi) south-west of Alma city center.

From the mouth of the Couchepaganiche River East, the current follows the course of the Couchepaganiche River on 6.8 km (4.2 mi) to the northwest, crosses Lake Saint-Jean north on 17.6 km (10.9 mi), then take the course of the Saguenay River via La Petite Décharge on 172.3 km (107.1 mi) until Tadoussac where it merges with the Saint Lawrence estuary.

== Toponymy ==
This river was formerly designated "Baillargeon river", "Petit Bras" and "Couchepaganiche stream". This toponym is linked to the main river “Rivière Couchepaganiche”.

The toponym “Rivière Couchepaganiche Est” was formalized on December 5, 1968, at the Place Names Bank of the Commission de toponymie du Québec.

== Appendices ==
=== Related articles ===
- Lac-Saint-Jean-Est Regional County Municipality
- Métabetchouan–Lac-à-la-Croix, a municipality
- Couchepaganiche River
- Lac Saint-Jean, a body of water
- Saguenay River, a stream
- List of rivers of Quebec
