= Centre de services scolaire de la Capitale =

Francophone school service centre in Quebec City, Canada

The Centre de services scolaire de la Capitale is Francophone school service centre of Quebec City.

It opened in 1998. Previously Commission des écoles catholiques de Québec operated public Catholic schools of all languages; francophone ones were transferred to de la Capitale while Central Quebec School Board took the English ones.

== Schools ==
Primary and Secondary:

- École régionale des Quatre-Saisons

Secondary:

- École Boudreau
- École Cardinal-Roy
- École Jean-de-Brébeuf
- École Joseph-François-Perrault
- École L'Odyssée
- École Saint-Denys-Garneau
- École secondaire de la Cité
- École secondaire de Neufchâtel
- École secondaire La Camaradière
- École secondaire Roger-Comtois
- École secondaire Vanier

Primary:

- École à l'Orée-des-Bois
- École Alexander-Wolff
- École Amédée-Boutin
- École Anne-Hébert
- École d'éducation internationale Notre-Dame-des-Neiges
- École de Château-d'Eau
- École de l'Accueil
- École de l'Apprenti-Sage
- École de l'Arc-en-Ciel
- École de l'Aventure
- École de l'Escabelle
  - Pavillons A-B-C
- École de La Chanterelle
- École de La Chaumière
- École de la Grande-Hermine
- École de la Mosaïque
- École de la Myriade
- École de la Source
- École des Berges
- École des Écrivains
- École des Explorateurs
- École des Jeunes-du-Monde
  - pavillon Bardy
  - pavillon Champfleury
- École Dominique-Savio
- École du Beau-Séjour
- École du Buisson
- École du Domaine
- École du Joli-Bois
- École du Val-Joli
- École du Vignoble
- École internationale de Saint-Sacrement
- École Jacques-Cartier
- École Jean-XXIII
- École Jules-Émond
- École L'Odyssée
- École Les Prés-Verts
  - Main campus
  - Pavillon Saint-Bernard
- École Marguerite-Bourgeoys
- École Notre-Dame-du-Canada
- École Sacré-Coeur
- École Saint-Albert-le-Grand
- École Saint-Claude
- École Saint-Denys-Garneau
- École Saint-Fidèle
- École Saint-Jean-Baptiste
- École Saint-Malo
- École Saint-Paul-Apôtre
- École Sainte-Monique
- École Sainte-Odile
- École Sans-Frontière
