= Couchepaganiche River =

River in Quebec, Canada

- Location within Quebec

Location
- Country: Canada
- Province: Quebec
- Region: Saguenay-Lac-Saint-Jean
- Regional County Municipality: Lac-Saint-Jean-Est Regional County Municipality
- Municipalities: Métabetchouan–Lac-à-la-Croix

Physical characteristics
- Source: Les Trois Lacs
  - location: Métabetchouan–Lac-à-la-Croix
  - coordinates: 48.30020°N 71.87355°W
  - elevation: 352
- Mouth: Lac Saint-Jean
  - location: Métabetchouan–Lac-à-la-Croix
  - coordinates: 48.4325°N 71.86806°W
  - elevation: 101 m (331 ft)
- Length: 23.8 km (14.8 mi)
- Discharge
  - location: Métabetchouan–Lac-à-la-Croix

Basin features
- Tributaries
  - left: Discharge of lac Skein.
  - right: (from the mouth) Couchepaganiche East River, discharge of lac Basile

The Rivière Couchepaganiche is a tributary of Lac Saint-Jean, flowing in the municipality of Métabetchouan–Lac-à-la-Croix, in the Lac-Saint-Jean-Est Regional County Municipality, in the administrative region of Saguenay–Lac-Saint-Jean, in the province of Quebec, in Canada. The course of the Couchepaganiche river crosses the township of Caron.

The lower part of the Couchepaganiche river valley is served by the route 169 which runs along the southeast shore of lac Saint-Jean. This valley is also served by some secondary forest roads, especially for forestry and recreational tourism activities.

Forestry and agriculture are the main economic activities in this valley; recreational tourism, second.

The surface of the Couchepaganiche River is usually frozen from the beginning of December to the end of March, however the safe circulation on the ice is generally made from mid-December to mid-March.

== Geography ==
The main watersheds neighboring the Couchepaganiche River are:

- north side: lac Saint-Jean;
- east side: La Belle Rivière, Bédard River, Petite rivière Bédard, Saguenay River;
- south side: lac de la Belle Rivière, La Belle Rivière, rivière des Aulnaies, Métabetchouane River, Couchepaganiche East River;
- west side: Métabetchouane River, Lac Saint-Jean.

The Couchepaganiche river rises from the water body in the south of Les Trois Lacs (length: 0.4 km (0.25 mi); altitude: 352 m (1,155 ft)) in the forest zone, located south- is from the Three Round Peaks Mountain. This source is located at:

- 12.8 km (8.0 mi) south-east of route 169;
- 7.8 km (4.8 mi) west of lac de la Belle Rivière;
- 14.8 km (9.2 mi) south-east of the center of the village of Métabetchouan;
- 14.9 km (9.3 mi) south-east of the confluence of the Couchepaganiche river and Lac Saint-Jean;
- 31.9 km (19.8 mi) south-west of downtown Alma.

From its source, the Couchepaganiche river flows over 23.8 km (14.8 mi) with a drop of 251 m (823 ft) entirely in forest and agricultural zone, according to the following segments:

- 7.8 km (4.8 mi) north-west, up to a bend in the river near the crossing of chemin du Petit rang and route Saint-André;
- 3.6 km (2.2 mi) northerly, curving northwest at the end of the segment, up to the outlet (coming from the northwest) of Skein Lake;
- 5.6 km (3.5 mi) towards the north-east, winding its way into agricultural territory and passing north of a mountain, to the confluence of the Couchepaganiche East River (coming from the south);
- 6.8 km (4.2 mi) towards the northwest by winding through an agricultural plain, cutting the path of 2e rang Ouest, the route 169 and the Canadian National railway at the end of the segment, to its mouth.

The Couchepaganiche river flows on the southeast shore of Lac Saint-Jean in the village of Métabetchouan. This confluence is located at:

- 7.3 km (4.5 mi) north-east of the confluence of the Métabetchouane River and Lac Saint-Jean;
- 14.8 km (9.2 mi) west of the village center of Hébertville;
- 17.0 km (10.6 mi) south of the mouth of Lac Saint-Jean (via La Petite Décharge);
- 20.6 km (12.8 mi) south-west of Alma city center;
- 59.3 km (36.8 mi) south-west of downtown Chicoutimi (sector of Saguenay (city)).

From the mouth of the Couchepaganiche river, located on the southeast shore of Lake Saint-Jean, the current crosses this lake north on 17.6 km (10.9 mi), then follows the course of the river Saguenay via the Petite Décharge on 172.3 km (107.1 mi) to Tadoussac where it merges with the Saint Lawrence estuary. f

== Toponymy ==
Joseph-Laurent Normandin notes in his "Travel Journal"... from 1732 the name "Guspajganichiche" to designate this river. In his deposition of 1823, the explorer François Verreault affirms that this small river is called "Koushpygish", Innu term meaning "where the water rises a little". However, the “Little Dictionary of Geographical Names of the Saguenay”, published in 1944, notes that “Koushpaiganish” is an Innu word meaning “small river of embarkation”, a meaning also attributed to him by the explorer Normandin.

The toponym “Rivière Couchepaganiche” was formalized on December 5, 1968, at the Place Names Bank of the Commission de toponymie du Québec.

== Appendices ==
=== Related articles ===
- Lac-Saint-Jean-Est Regional County Municipality
- Métabetchouan–Lac-à-la-Croix, a municipality
- Couchepaganiche East River
- Lac Saint-Jean, a body of water
- Saguenay River, a stream
- List of rivers of Quebec
