= Métabetchouan–Lac-à-la-Croix =

- City
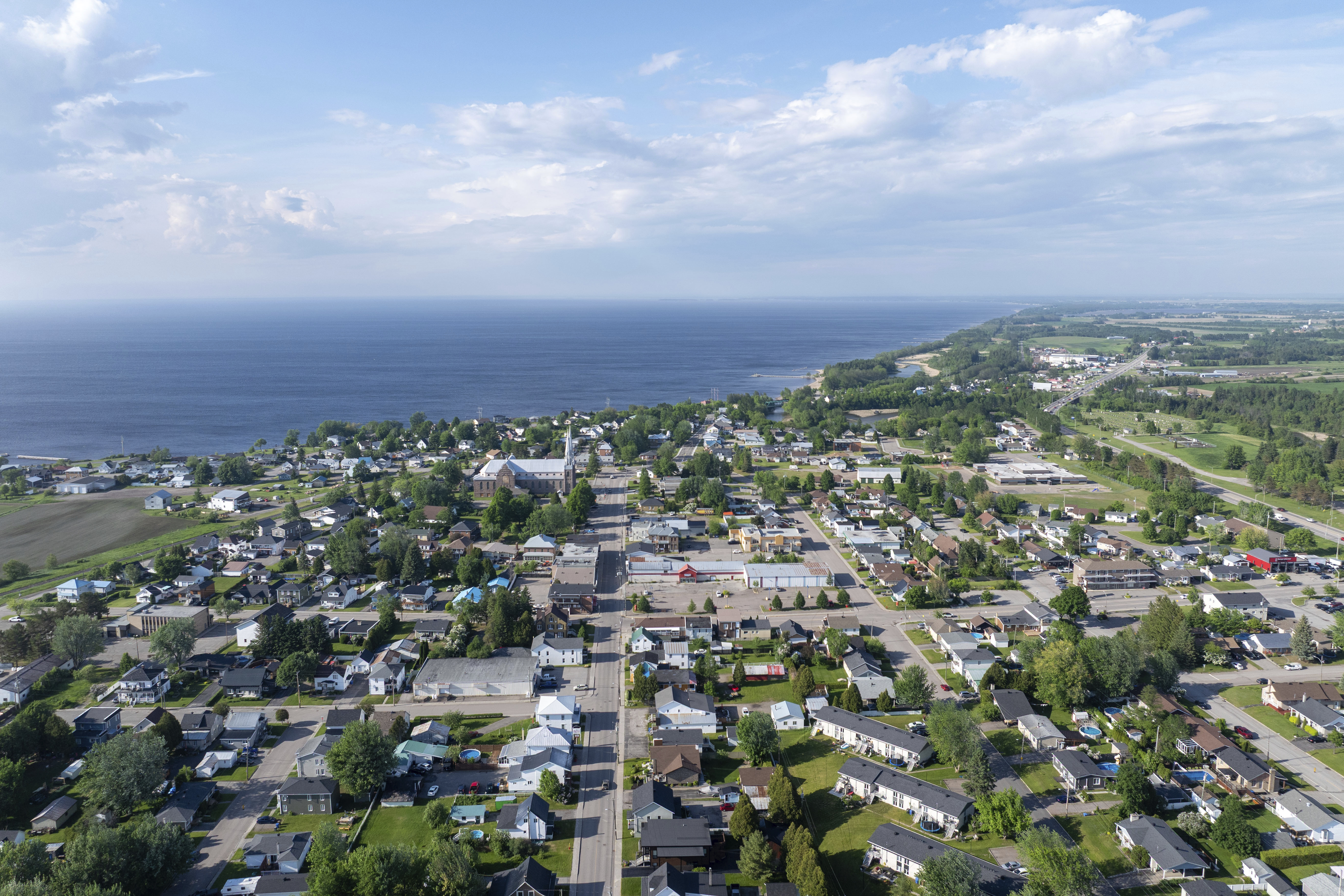
- Métabetchouan–Lac-à-la-Croix in 2026

- Location in Lac-Saint-Jean Quebec
- Coordinates: 48°26′N 71°52′W
- Country: Canada
- Province: Quebec
- Region: Saguenay–Lac-Saint-Jean
- RCM: Lac-Saint-Jean-Est
- Settled: 1861
- Constituted: January 6, 1999

Government
  - Mayor: André Fortin
  - Federal riding: Lac-Saint-Jean
  - Prov. riding: Lac-Saint-Jean

Area
  - City: 193.80 km^{2} (74.83 sq mi)
  - Land: 187.49 km^{2} (72.39 sq mi)
  - Urban: 2.52 km^{2} (0.97 sq mi)

Population (2021)
  - City: 4,121
  - Density: 22/km^{2} (57/sq mi)
  - Urban: 2,222
  - Urban density: 882.5/km^{2} (2,286/sq mi)
  - Pop 2016-2021: ▲3.4%
  - Dwellings: 2,075
- Time zone: UTC−5 (EST)
  - Summer (DST): UTC−4 (EDT)
- Postal code(s): G8G
- Area codes: 418 and 581
- Highways: R-169; R-170
- Website: www.ville. metabetchouan.qc.ca

Métabetchouan–Lac-à-la-Croix is a city in Quebec, Canada, in the Saguenay–Lac-Saint-Jean region.

The city consists of the population centres of Métabetchouan, on the shores of Lac Saint-Jean at the mouth of the small Couchepaganiche River, and Lac-à-la-Croix, a few kilometres to the east on Cross Lake.

== History ==
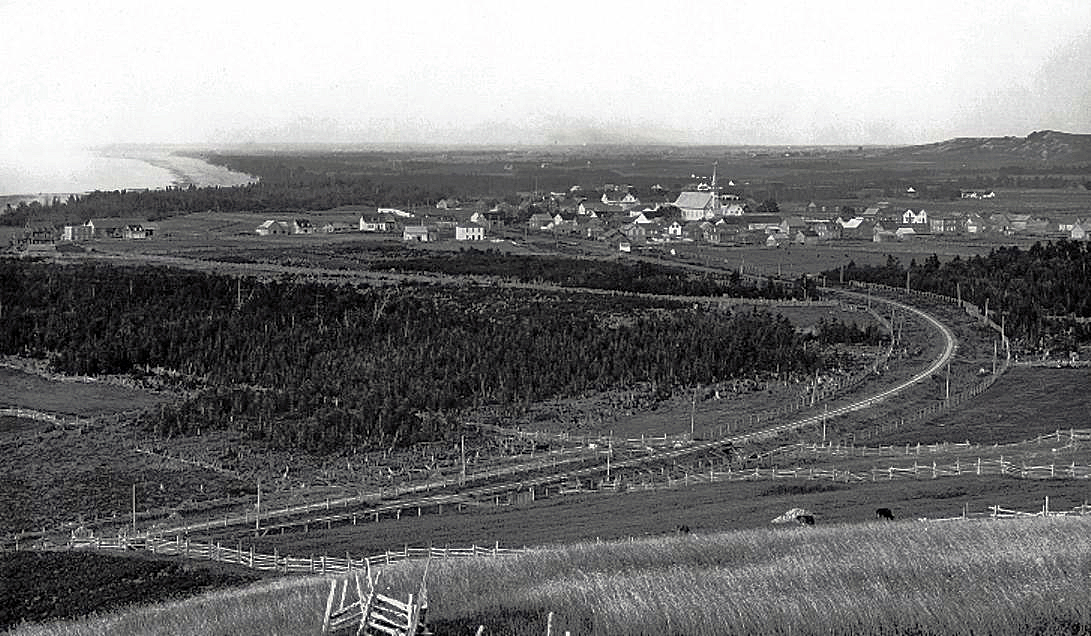
St-Jerome circa 1903

Historically the territory of the indigenous Innu, the first European, Jesuit Jean de Quen, visited the place in 1647, followed by Charles Albanel in 1671, during the meeting of twenty Indian nations. Five years later in 1676, a trading post and mission were established there. However, real colonization only began after the proclamation of Métabetchouan Township in 1857, and the first settlers arrived from the South Shore and Bagotville in 1861. That same year, Stanislas Drapeau reported the presence of 154 people including 36 "savages" in Métabetchouan Township.

The place was first called Saint-Jérôme, in honour of Jérôme Demers (1774-1853), vicar general of the Bishop of Quebec (1825-1853). In 1870, it was nearly destroyed by a great fire, that only spared some twenty houses. In 1872, the Parish Municipality of Saint-Jérôme was formed, and in 1898, the village itself separated and was incorporated as the Village Municipality of Saint-Jérôme.

As for Lac-à-la-Croix, the first settlers came in 1864, and by 1910, it had some 800 inhabitants. Its parish was established in March 1911 and in December that same year, it was incorporated as the Parish Municipality of Sainte-Croix. In 1953, the village itself separated and formed the Village Municipality of Sainte-Croix, later renamed to Lac-à-la-Croix (French for "Lake at the Cross"). It was named after the adjacent lake where, according to popular thought, a cross was planted on its shores by François de Crespieul in the 17th century. However, this has been proven untrue since missionaries never went through this place. The lake was probably named for having a resemblance to a cross.

In 1975, the Parish and Village Municipalities of Saint-Jérôme merged to form the new City of Métabetchouan, named after the township and the nearby Métabetchouane River. The following year, the Parish Municipality of Sainte-Croix and the Village Municipality of Lac-à-la-Croix also merged to form the Municipality of Lac-à-la-Croix. On January 6, 1999, the City of Métabetchouan and the Municipality of Lac-à-la-Croix amalgamated to form the new city of Métabetchouan–Lac-à-la-Croix.

== Demographics ==
In the 2021 Census of Population conducted by Statistics Canada, Métabetchouan—Lac-à-la-Croix had a population of 4,121 living in 1,806 of its 2,075 total private dwellings, a change of 3.4% from its 2016 population of 3,985. With a land area of 187.49 km^{2} (72.39 sq mi), it had a population density of 22.0/km^{2} (56.9/sq mi) in 2021.

Historical census populations – Métabetchouan-Lac-à-la-Croix, Quebec

Year	Pop.	±%
2001	4,198	—
2006	4,084	−2.7%

Year	Pop.	±%
2011	4,097	+0.3%
2016	3,985	−2.7%

Year	Pop.	±%
2021	4,121	+3.4%

Population counts are not adjusted for boundary changes.
Source: Statistics Canada

Mother tongue:

- English as first language: 0.5%
- French as first language: 98.9%
- English and French as first language: 0.2%
- Other as first language: 0.3%

== Education ==
Centre de services scolaire du Lac-Saint-Jean operates francophone public schools:

- École Mgr-Victor
- École secondaire Curé-Hébert (Hébertville)

The Central Quebec School Board operates anglophone public schools, including:

- Riverside Regional Elementary School in Saguenay
- Riverside Regional High School in Saguenay

== See also ==
- List of cities in Quebec
