= Quebec High School =

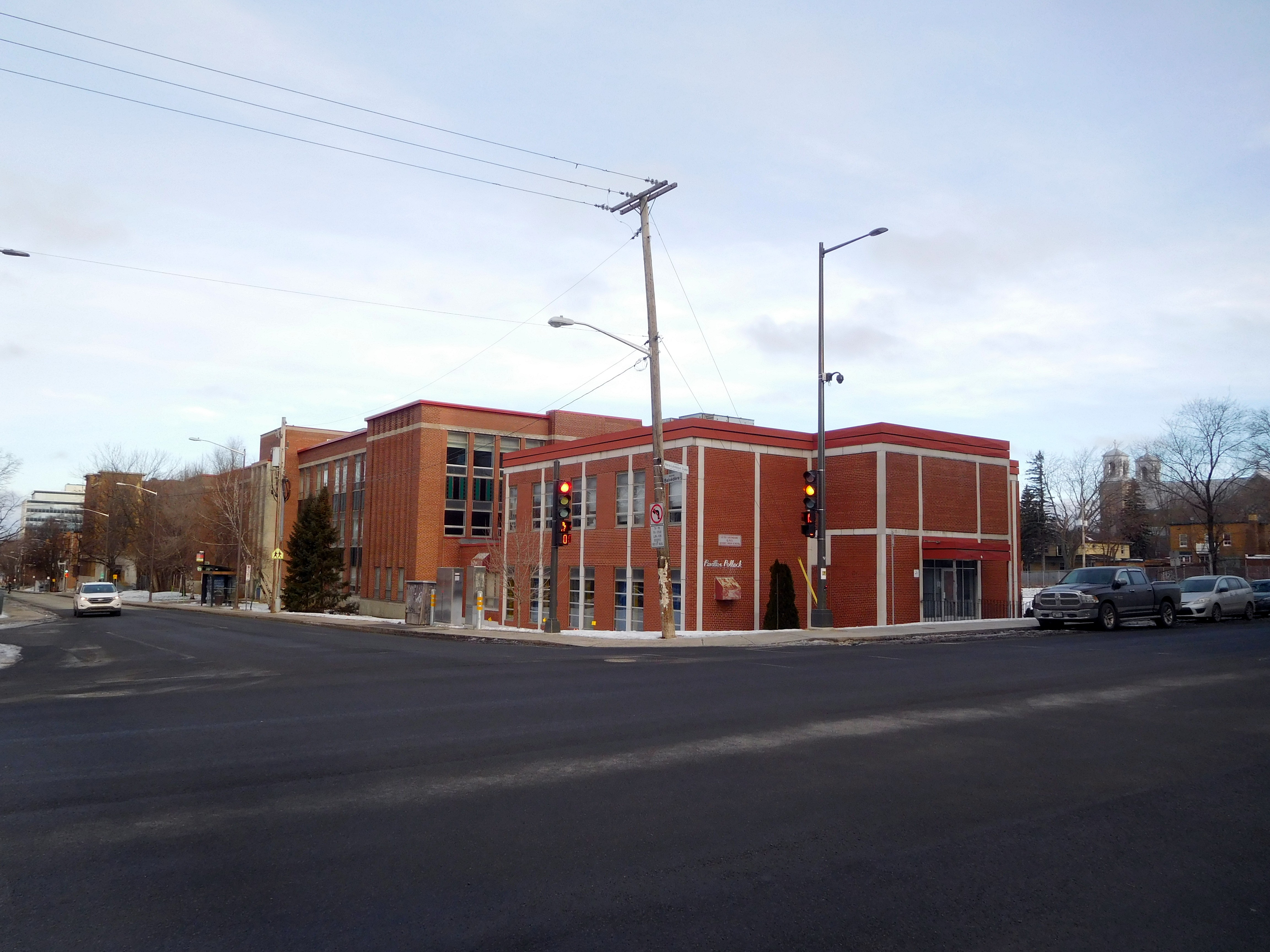

Location
- 945, avenue Belvédère; Quebec City, Quebec, G1S 3G2; Canada; 46°47′52″N 71°14′23″W

Information
- School type: Public school
- Motto: Animo et Fide (Prosper and Integrity)
- School board: Central Quebec School Board
- Principal: Paula Breton
- Staff: 73
- Grades: Secondary I-V (12-17)
- Enrollment: 350
- Language: English
- Website: www.quebechighschool.com

Quebec High School (QHS) is a high school belonging to the Central Quebec School Board. The School is located in Quebec City, Quebec, Canada, and is one of three English-language high schools that serve the Quebec City region (the others being Saint Patrick's High School and Dollard-des-Ormeaux located on CFB Valcartier). The school is composed of three main floors. The school was established in 1804, with an addition of a Girls Only wing in 1875, but in 1941 the school became a mixed school integrating both sexes.

In 2006, QHS began a three-year process to implement an initiative called the Community Learning Centre Project. This initiative was made possible through the Canada Entente agreement with the federal government and the Quebec Ministry of Education.

The school's sports program offers coaching for soccer, basketball, street hockey, ultimate frisbee, flag football, volleyball, and cross-country. It offers both soccer and basketball "concentrations" where students sometimes spend the first part of their morning developing their sport-specific athletic skills.
