= Shawinigan High School =

- Shawinigan Turpis

Location
- 1125, avenue des Cèdres; Shawinigan, Quebec, G9N 1P7; Canada; 46.5452°N 72.7464°W

Information
- Motto: Mens Sana in Corpore Sano (A sound mind in a sound body)
- Status: Open
- School board: Central Quebec School Board
- Language: English language
- Song: Canadian anthem
- Sports: Basketball
- Mascot: David the Demon
- Website: admin-cqsb.telusportal.com/en/web/shs/ www.cqsb.qc.ca/en/shawinigan-high-school

Shawinigan High School is an English-language combined elementary and secondary school in Shawinigan, Quebec, Canada.

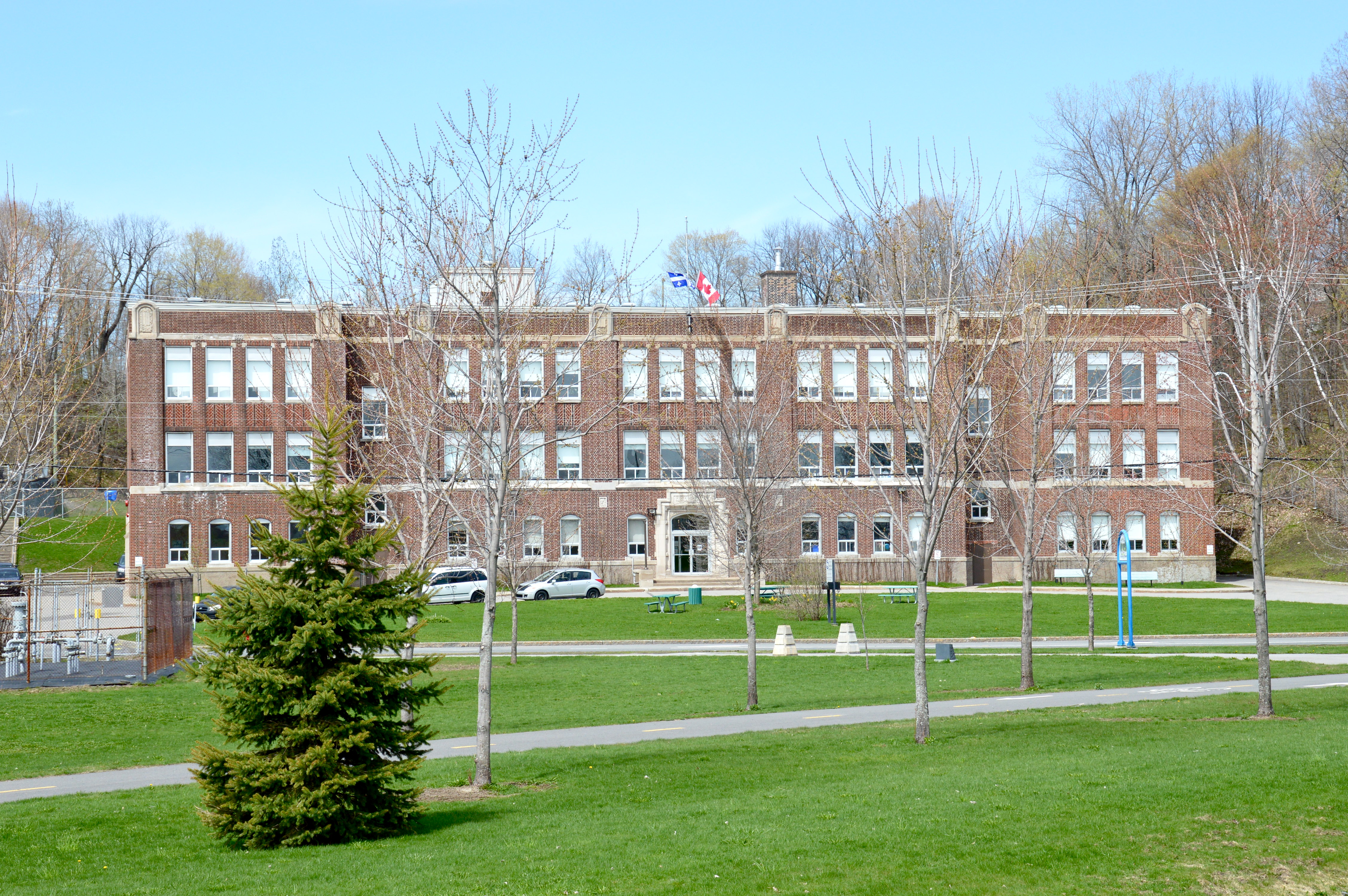
Shawinigan High School

The school is operated by the Central Quebec School Board. Parents can participate on the school's governing board and in its Home and School Association.

== History ==
Shawinigan High School was built in 1926 at a cost of about $150,000. At the time, the school building was ahead of its time, with electric clocks and bells, a gymnasium, separate bathrooms for men and women, and temperature controlled heating and cooling systems.
