= St. Patrick's Church (Quebec City) =

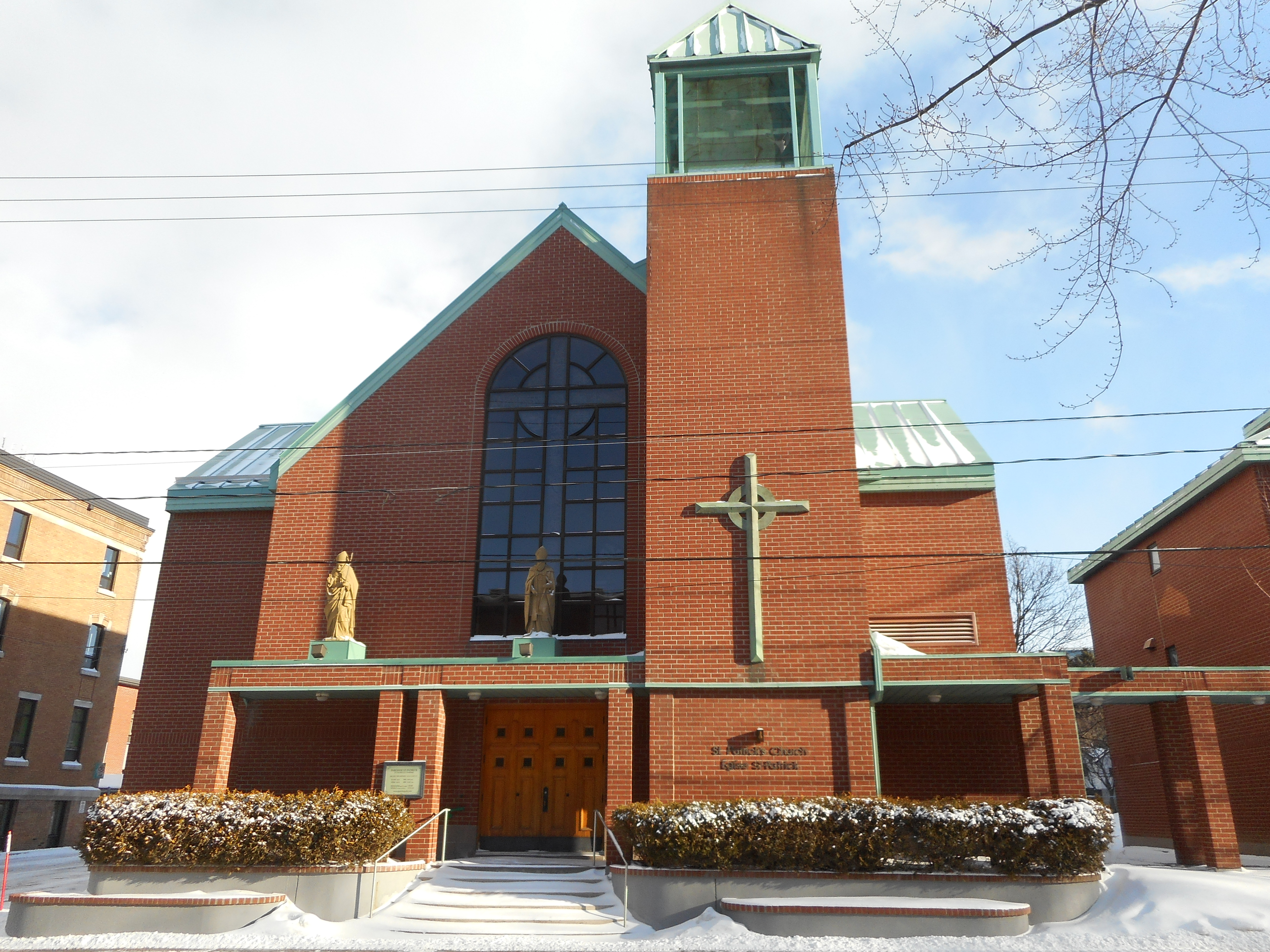
- St. Patrick's Church, Quebec City

- Location of St. Patrick's Church in Quebec City
- 46.8042°N 71.2241°W
- Location: 1145, avenue de Salaberry; Quebec City, Quebec; G1R 2V7
- Denomination: Roman Catholic
- Website: stpatricksquebec.com

History
- Status: Catholic church
- Founded: 1832
- Dedication: Saint Patrick

Architecture
- Functional status: Functional
- Designated: 1988
- Architect: Thomas Baillargé
- Architectural type: Parish
- Completed: 1843

Administration
- Archdiocese: Quebec

St. Patrick's Church is the only English-speaking parish in the Archdiocese of Quebec, located in Quebec City, Quebec, Canada. Founded in 1832, the parish has occupied several different buildings as the population of English-speaking Catholics, primarily Irish, in Quebec City grew or declined.

== History ==
The first Mass for Irish immigrants in Quebec City was celebrated in 1819; before St. Patrick's was established as a parish the Irish were allowed use of Notre Dame Basilica and Notre-Dame-des-Victoires Church in Place Royale for their services. English-speaking Catholics in the city were organized into a separate congregation with a dedicated priest in 1822. Father Patrick McMahon was the priest of congregation from 1822 to 1825 and again after 1828. McMahon arrived in Quebec in 1818, along with about twenty relatives. After completing his studies at the Seminaire de Saint-Hyacinthe he was ordained in 1822. He became a curate at Notre-Dame de Québec assigned to attend to the needs of the Irish.

McMahon raised the money for a separate church and lobbied the French-speaking Church Wardens. The first St. Patrick's was built on Rue Ste. Helene, on what is now McMahon Street (named after Father Patrick) inside the walls of the Old Quebec. A cholera epidemic in 1832 delayed the laying of the cornerstone. Designed by Thomas Baillarge it opened for worship on July 7, 1833, It was at first a chapel of Notre-Dame with sacramental registers kept at the cathedral. The church was enlarged in 1876.

This church was replaced by a larger church on the Grand Allée in 1914, but the old church continued to be used occasionally until 1967. It burned in 1970 and its outside facade was reused as part of an annex of the Hôtel-Dieu de Québec hospital. From 1874 to 1962, the parish was served by priests from the Redemptorists.

The 1914 church was used until it was demolished in 1988. This was replaced by the current and smaller church on De Salaberry Avenue.

== Gallery ==
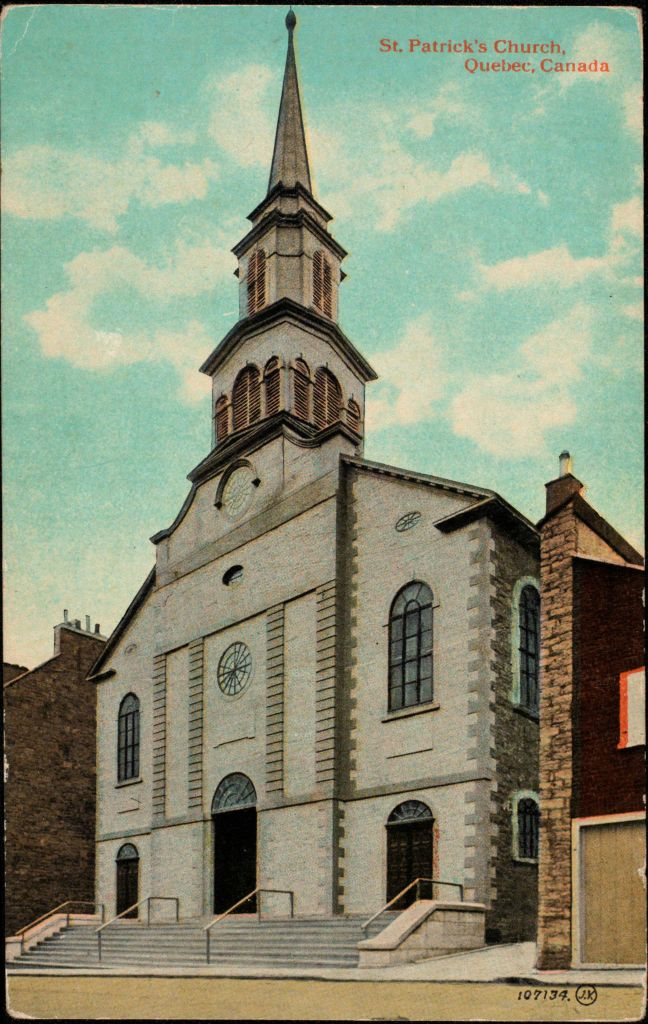
McMahon Street

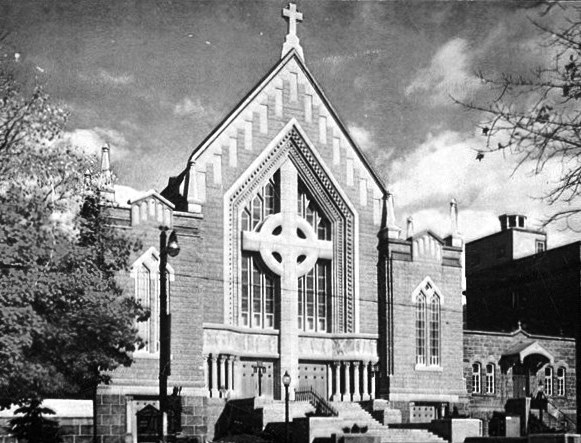
Grande Allée

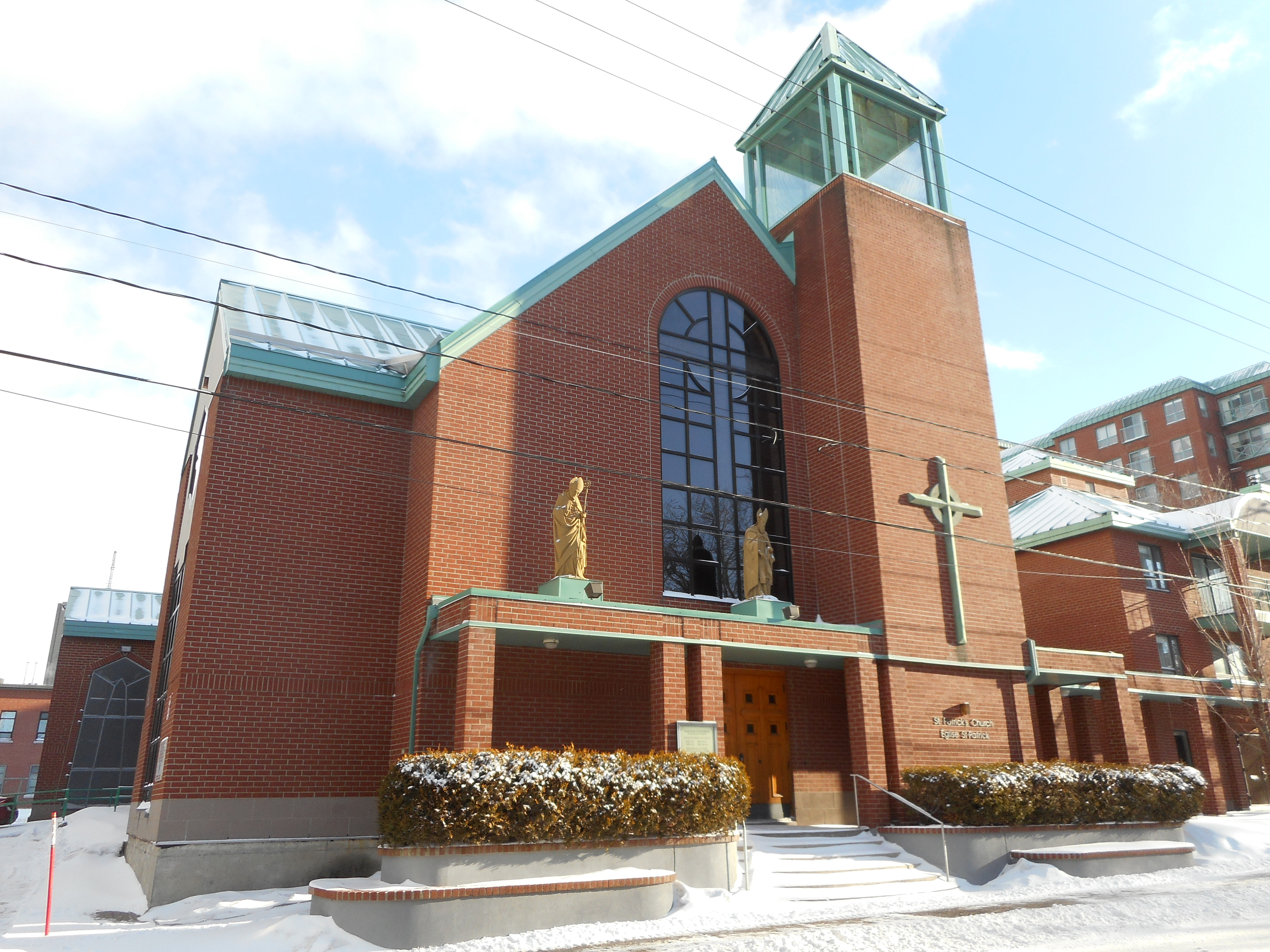
1145 De Salaberry Avenue

In 1843 the Christian Brothers established St. Patrick's School across the street from the church. The brothers taught boys grades one through six. The girls of the parish attended schools run by the Ursulines, the Good Shepherd Nuns and the Grey Nuns.
