= St. Patrick's High School (Quebec City) =

School in Quebec, Canada

Coordinates: 46.8048°N 71.2240°W

Location
- Quebec City; Canada

Information
- Established: 1843
- School board: CQSB

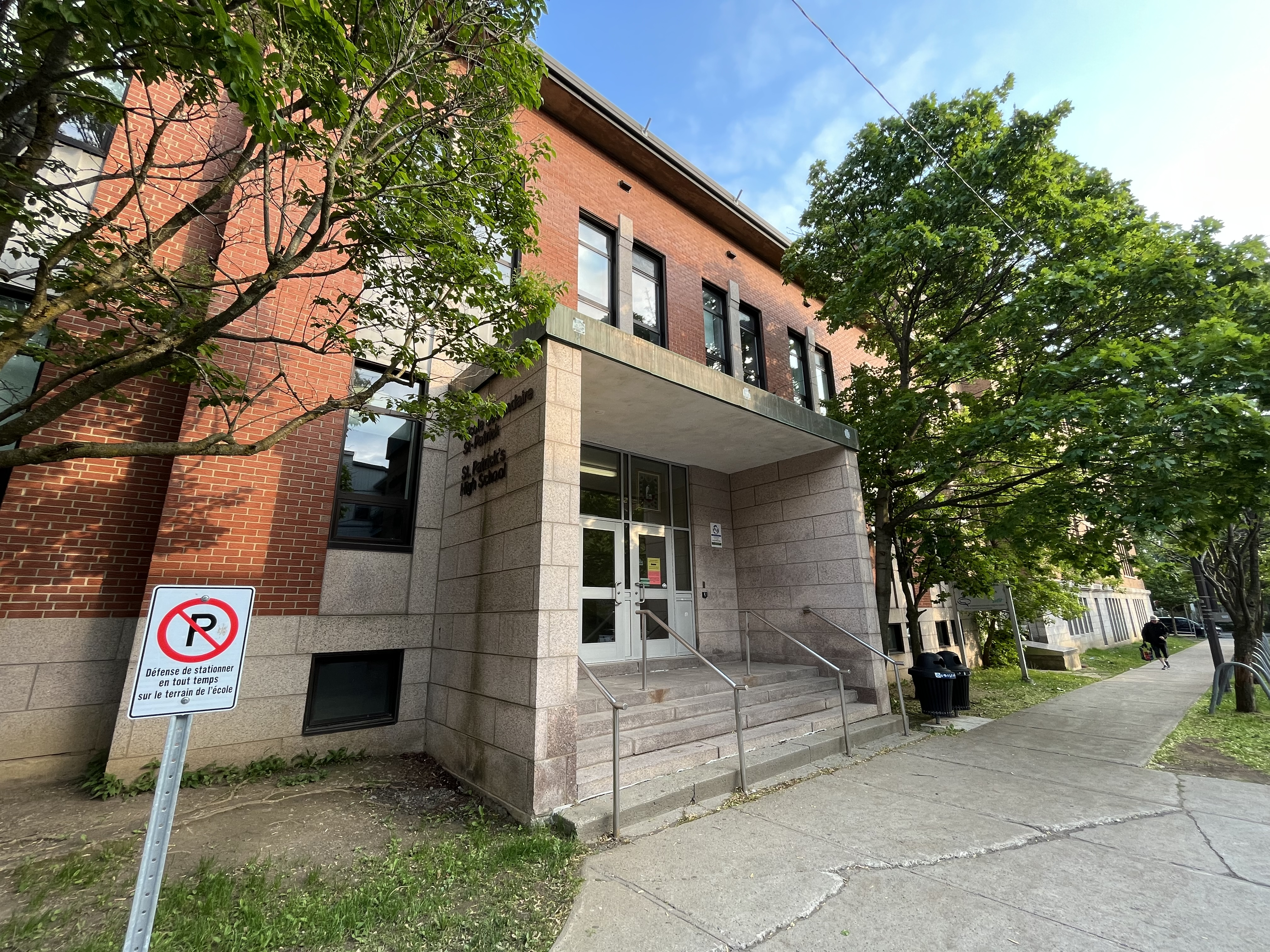
Exterior view, June 2023

St. Patrick's High School ("St. Pat's") is an English language high school in Quebec City and a part of the Central Quebec School Board (CQSB).

== History ==
St. Patrick's was established in 1843 on Rue Ste. Helene, on what is now McMahon Street opposite St. Patrick's Church. It was run by the Christian Brothers for boys grades one through six. In 1846 it joined Commission des écoles catholiques de Québec, a Roman Catholic school district. St. Patrick served as one of its Anglophone high schools, and by 1997 was its only one. It served the Irish Canadian population of Quebec City. In 1998 the religious school boards were dissolved and replaced with secular ones, so St. Patrick's became a part of the CQSB.
