= Riverside Regional High School =

Location
- 1770, rue Joule; Saguenay, Quebec; G7S 3B1; Canada
- Coordinates: 48°25′59″N 71°11′2″W

Information
- School district: Central Quebec School Board
- Website: www.cqsb.qc.ca/en/web/riverside-regional-high-school

Riverside Regional High School is an English-language secondary school in the Arvida area of Saguenay, Quebec, Canada. It occupies the building of the former Saguenay Valley High School, constructed in 1962. It is operated by the Central Quebec School Board. The school was created by the merger of Saguenay Valley High School and the high school grades of St. Patrick's School in 1997 at the time that the Quebec government replaced confessional school boards (Catholic or Protestant) with linguistic boards (French or English). In 2016, Riverside High School merged with Riverside Elementary School, creating one school for English students.
