= Central Quebec School Board =

English-language school board of Quebec, Canada

Central Québec School Board Commission scolaire Central Québec
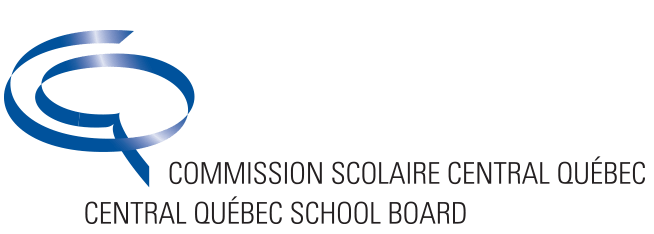

Address
- 2046, chemin Saint-Louis Québec, Québec, G1T 1P4; Canada
- Coordinates: 46°46′42″N 71°15′07″W

District information
- Type: Public
- Established: 1998
- Director General: Stephen Pigeon
- School board: 1. Québec City Region (East); 2. Québec City Region (Upper Town); 3. Québec City Region (Centre & L'Ancienne-Lorette); 4. Shannon, Valcartier, Stoneham, Fossambault & Lac-Beauport; 5. St. Augustin, Portneuf County & Trois-Rivières (East); 6. South Shore of Québec (East); 7. South Shore of Québec (Nicolet, Thetford Mines & Lotbinière); 8. Trois-Rivières West & Shawinigan Region; 9. La Tuque Region; 10. Chibougamau Region; 11. Saguenay / Lac-St-Jean Region
- Chair of the board: Stephen Burke
- Governing agency: Ministère de l’Éducation et de l’Enseignement supérieur (MEES)
- Schools: 18

Other information
- Region: Capitale-Nationale — 03
- Organization code: 881000
- Linguistic status: English-speaker
- Website: CQSB.qc.ca

The Central Québec School Board (CQSB; French: Commission scolaire Central Québec) is an English-language school board in the province of Quebec, Canada, with its headquarters at 2046 chemin Saint-Louis, Quebec City. It is one of nine English-language school boards in the province, having served the English-speaking community, under various names, since 1867.

As a school board, CQSB's jurisdiction covers the largest territory in the province of Quebec, at 493,495 kilometres (306,644 miles). The Central Québec School Board administers 18 schools and one adult and vocational education centre. In 2012, eight of its nine secondary schools had a student population of less than 500. CQSB's largest elementary school served almost 500 students, and its smallest one served less than 60 students in 2012.

== History ==
In 1997, the Quebec government abolished denominational school boards, adopting linguistic school boards instead. Born out of the Eastern Quebec Regional School Board, Greater Quebec School Board, Mauricie School Board and the Saguenay "P" School Board, it has sprouted from their denominational origins, also incorporating English-language schools from other school boards.

== Schools ==
Central Québec School Board comprises the following schools:

- A.S. Johnson Memorial School and St. Patrick Elementary School — in Thetford Mines
- Dollard-Des-Ormeaux School — in Shannon
- Jimmy Sandy Memorial School — in Kawawachikamach
- La Tuque High School — in La Tuque
- MacLean Memorial School (formerly Chibougamau Protestant School) — in Chibougamau
- Mauricie English Elementary School and Three Rivers Academy — in Trois-Rivières
- Shawinigan High School — in Shawinigan
- Portneuf Elementary School — in Cap-Santé
- Riverside Regional Elementary School and Riverside Regional High School (formerly St. Patrick's and Saguenay Valley Schools) in Saguenay
- Valcartier Elementary School in Saint-Gabriel-de-Valcartier
- Everest, Holland, and Ste-Foy elementary schools; St. Patrick's High School, Quebec High School, and Saint-Vincent School — in the Sainte-Foy–Sillery–Cap-Rouge borough of Quebec City

The school board also provides services through its Eastern Québec Learning Centre, which dispenses both adult general education and vocational education at its location in the Sainte-Foy district of Quebec City.

== School board profile ==
Enrollment is small comparatively to French-language school boards in the administrative regions where the schools are located; some remote schools have student populations of under 100; the largest schools have nearly 600 students.

Because of the small number of English-speaking students in the area served by the school board, its schools are spread hundreds of kilometres apart. Some schools, as in Jonquière or Valcartier, serve Canadian Forces bases; the school board also has students of the Naskapi Nation in northern Quebec under its care.

The school board holds an annual basketball tournament, which is held at a member school, generally in Quebec City, but at times elsewhere.
