= MacDonald River (Côte-Nord) =

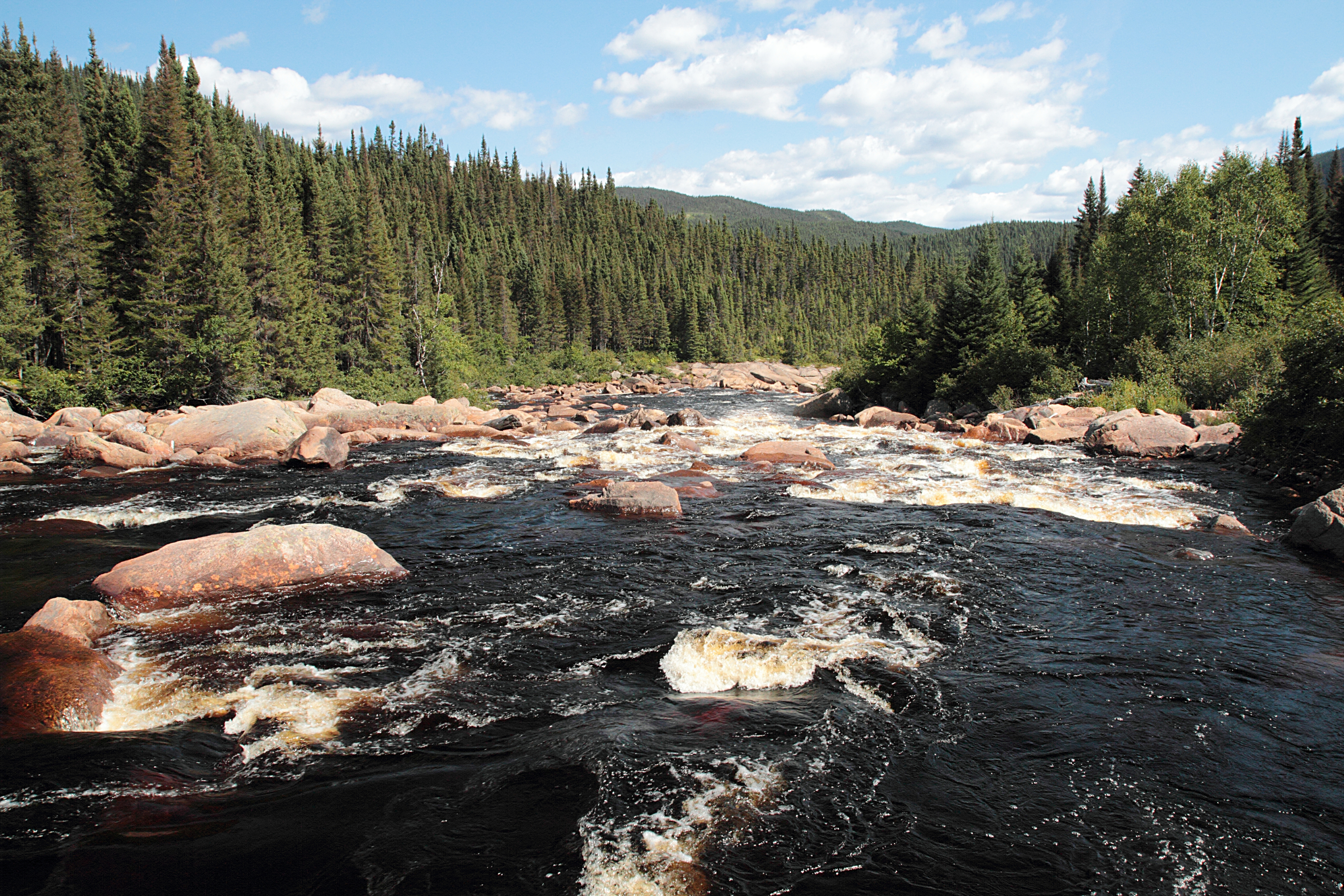
- MacDonald River

- Location within Quebec
- Native name: Rivière MacDonald (French)

Location
- Country: Canada
- Province: Quebec
- Administrative region: Côte-Nord

Physical characteristics
- Mouth
  - coordinates: 50.131707°N 67.13602°W
- Length: 42 kilometres (26 mi)

Basin features
- River system: Aux Rochers River
- Tributaries
  - left: Ronald River
- NRC id: EHCDZ

The MacDonald River (French: Rivière MacDonald) is a river in Quebec, Canada, to the north of the lower Saint Lawrence River. It is known for its dramatic cascade, the Chute MacDonald. (Note: The term Chute MacDonald means "MacDonald Waterfall", but "cascade" is a more accurate description of this fast-moving section.)

== Location ==
The MacDonald River is in the unorganized territory of Lac-Walker in the Sept-Rivières Regional County Municipality of the Côte-Nord administrative region of Quebec. The river is 42 kilometres (26 mi) long. The MacDonald is one of the main tributaries of the Aux Rochers River, the others being the Pasteur, Gravel and Schmon.

The river forms to the north of Lake Valilée from streams draining Lake des Deux Crétes, Lake Chemin de Fer and smaller water bodies. The lower portion of the river flows through the proposed Lake Walker National Park from the point where it converges with the Ronald River. From there it flows south and then east for 5 kilometres (3.1 mi) to the northern end of Lake Quatre Lieues, and continues east to join the Aux Rochers River to the south of Lake Walker.

The Cartier Railway runs along the MacDonald River valley for much of its length. The railway links the Mont Wright iron mine near Fermont to Port-Cartier. The railway engineers ran the line along the well-drained rocky shoreline of the river, staying safely above the level of spring floods. The engineers kept the northbound grade to a maximum of 1.35% and the southbound grade to a maximum of 0.4%. The rail bed is generally notched into the sides of the river valleys to avoid problems with frost heaves in the valley floor. There is an old site near the river contaminated with light hydrocarbons (petroleum products). The file on this site was closed in 2000.

== Environment ==
The region is in the boreal climate zone. A map of the Ecological regions of Quebec shows the river rising and flowing south through the eastern spruce/moss domain of the boreal zone. The average annual temperature in the region is 0 °C (32 °F). The warmest month is July, when the average temperature is 16 °C (61 °F), and the coldest is January, with −17 °C (1 °F).

== Name ==
The Commission de toponymie du Québec, the public body responsible for managing Québec place names, says that the MacDonald River and its tributary, the Ronald River, may have been named in honor of Ian and Ronald MacDonald. The MacDonald River was officially named on 8 April 1975. Ian MacDonald was superintendent of the Ontario Paper Company at Shelter Bay until 1935, and Ronald was his son.

== Geology ==
The floor of the MacDonald River valley is filled with terraced deltaic deposits formed by sedimentation in front of a decaying glacier. One section of the lower river valley has many ridges and old meander arms, with crescent shaped sandbars covered with alders. The MacDonald River cascade is associated with a glacial lock, or riegel, an area where the rock was more resistant to the movement of the glaciers. The cascade descends along a slope about 30 metres (98 ft) high. Traces of the glaciers are visible near the waterfall and further upstream, including polished surfaces, striations and grooves.

== Tourist attraction ==
The Chute MacDonald can be reached from Baie-Comeau by taking 138 east to Port-Cartier, then turning north on Shelter Bay road. About 33 kilometres (21 mi) along this dirt road there is a parking spot near a series of rapids along the road. From there the falls are reached by a well marked and low difficult footpath. At the falls there are picnic tables, dry toilets and a bridge.

The MacDonald and the Aux Rochers are recognized as Atlantic salmon (Salmo salar) rivers. During the 2006 season fly fishing was allowed from May to September for species other than salmon in the section from Lake Valilée down to MacDonald falls, and in the section below the footbridge down to the river mouth. Fly fishing for 1-2 salmon was allowed from July to September in the section from the footbridge down to Lake Quatre Lieues.

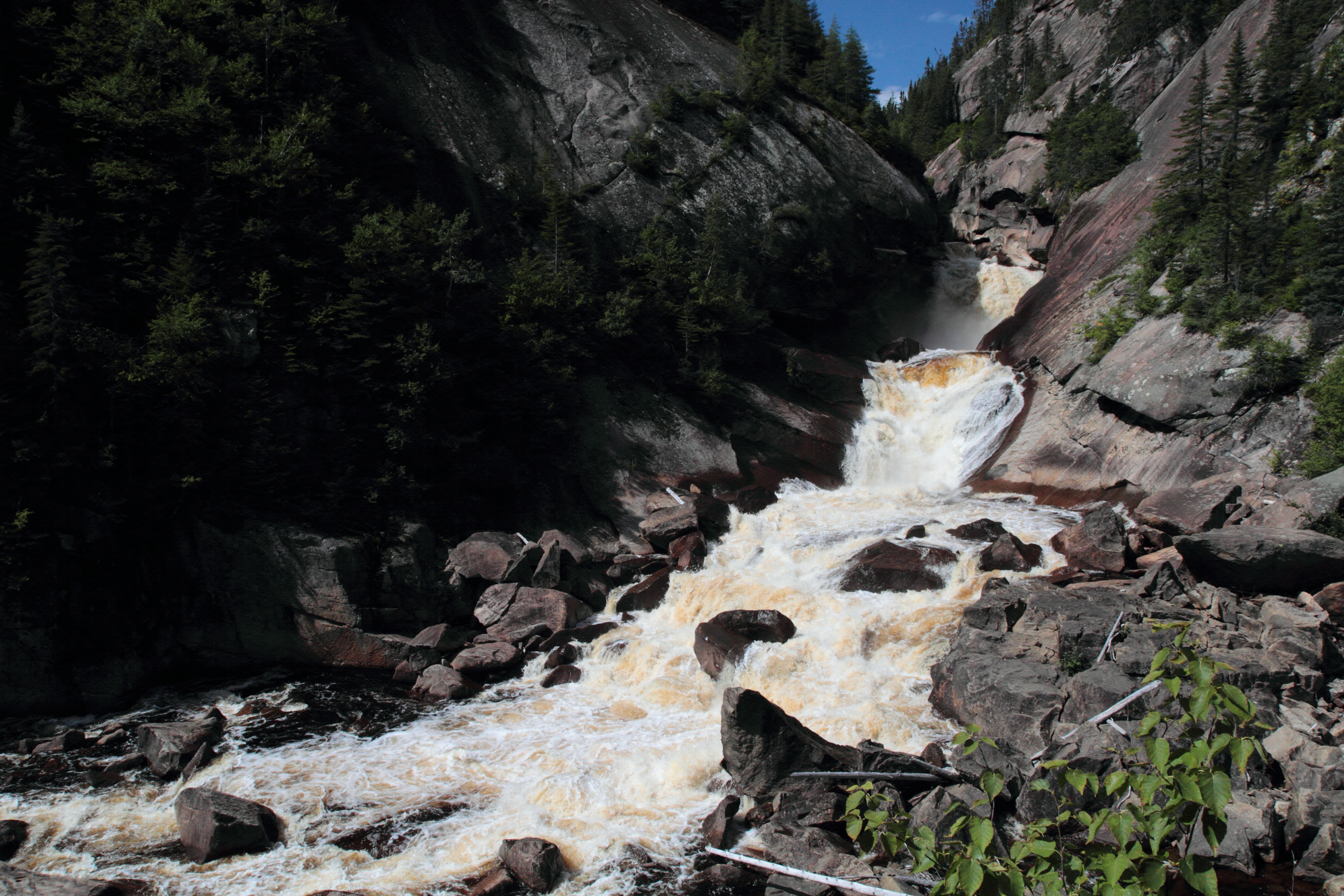
Chute MacDonald

The river is popular for canoeing, since during high water periods there are few portages. When combined with the Aux Rochers River it gives a 52 kilometres (32 mi) descent. The Port-Cartier-Sept-Îles Wildlife Sanctuary has developed trails along the river that lead from cottages to the Chute MacDonald. A walkway and gazebo allow accessibility and observation of the natural environment and the geomorphology of the area. MacDonald Falls and footbridge on the MacDonald River is one of the attractions of the Port-Cartier–Sept-Îles Wildlife Reserve, as are the Carlos Falls and the De la Montagne and MacDonald hiking trails.

The falls are among the major natural attractions that would be included in the proposed Lake Walker National Park, the others being Lake Walker, Lake Quatre Lieux, the Forêt ancienne du Lac-Larry and the Aux Rochers River. The study of the park area by the Forest, Wildlife and Parks department was filed in 2018, but as of May 2009 the park proposal was waiting for funding.

== Lakes ==
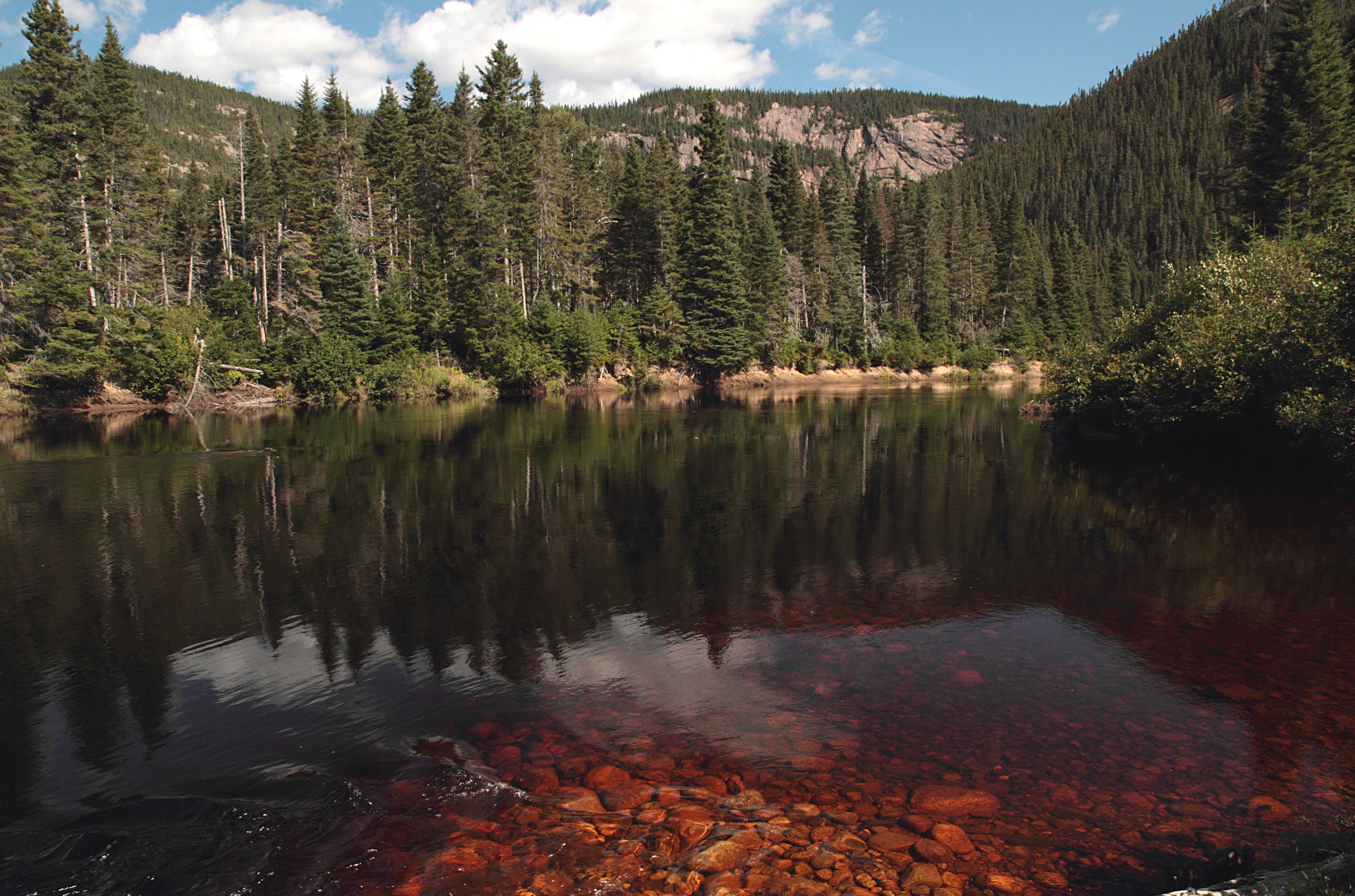
Quiet section

The official map of the proposed Lake Walker National Park shows a number of lakes that drain into the MacDonald River, mostly from the east:

Lake	Coordinates	Map
Lake Valilée	50.5333°N 67.4125°W	EIKAG
Lake Rouge	50.5305°N 67.3611°W	EHXQV
Lake Chisholm	50.3955°N 67.3188°W	EFXFS
Lake Cody	50.3102°N 67.3405°W	EJBIN
Lake Larry	50.2683°N 67.3277°W	EGXYT
Lake Jumbo	50.2555°N 67.3305°W	EGUPF
Lake Quatre Lieues	50.0566°N 67.1500°W	EHTVV

=== Lake Jumbo ===
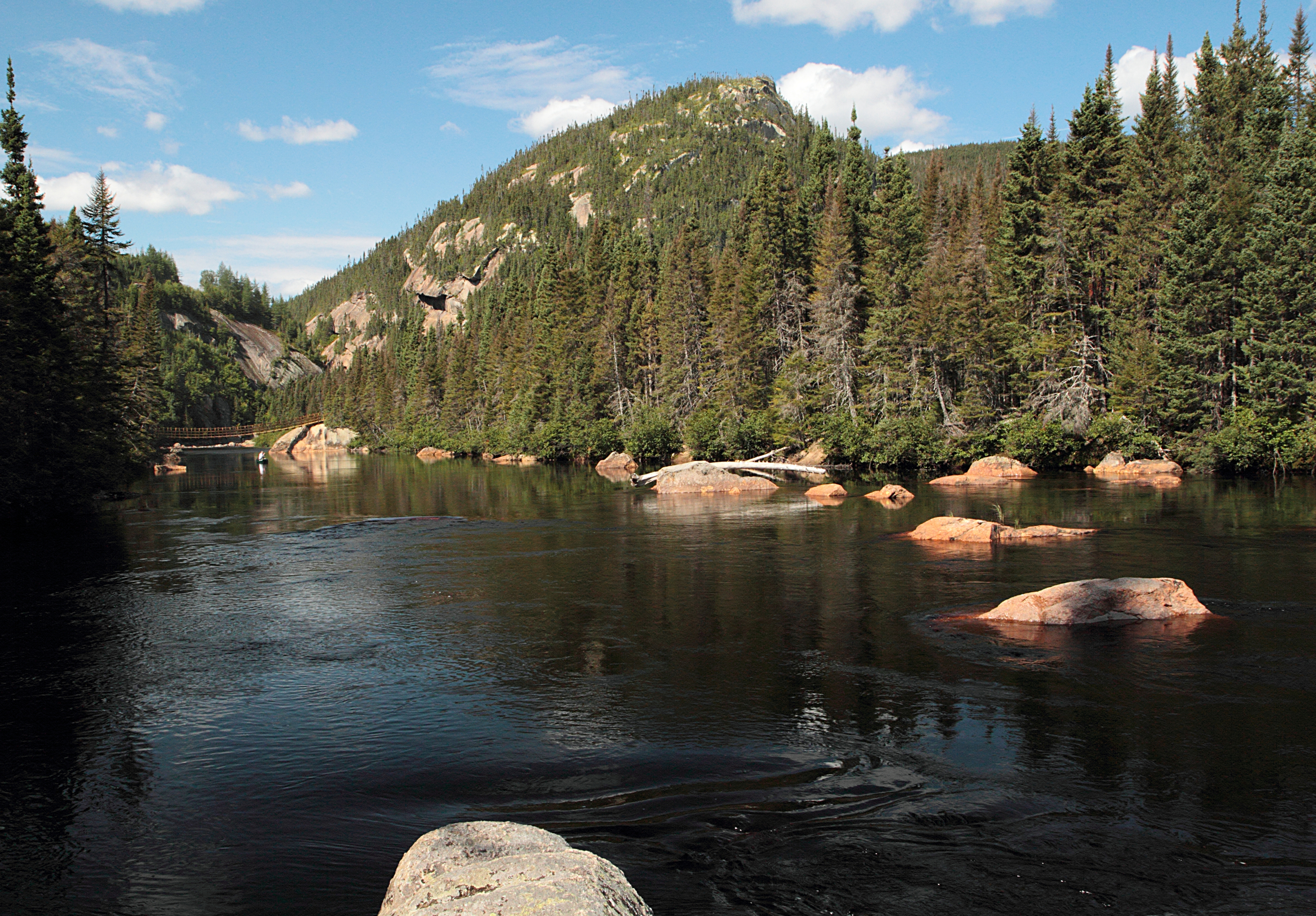
Section of the river

Lac Jumbo was officially named on 3 October 1972. The lake is 427 meters above sea level. It is just south of Lake Larry, in the southeast of the proposed Lake Walker National Park. It is between the Ronald River and the MacDonald River, into which it drains. The region has high hills with flattened tops, and is crossed by numerous streams. The eastern shore of the lake borders the Forêt ancienne du Lac-Larry (Lake Larry Old Growth Forest). This consists mostly of black spruce and balsam fir trees that are over 200 years old and have not been seriously affected by fire, insects, windstorms or logging.

=== Lake Quatre Lieues ===
Lake Quatre Lieues is in the extreme south of the proposed Lake Walker National Park. The MacDonald River flows through the northern end of the lake from west to east. The lake is about 116 metres (381 ft) above sea level. The Port-Cartier–Sept-Îles Wildlife Reserve offers chalet rentals for hunting and fishing in the Quatre-lieues area. The hunting area is about 150 square kilometres (58 sq mi) with hardwood forests about 50 years old and mature spruce.

== Sources ==
- Bellavance, Denis (2018). "Projet de parc national du Lac-Walker, Descriptions géologiques, géomorphologiques et sites d'intérêt" (PDF). Équipe écologie et territoire, Direction de l’expertise en biodiversité, Ministère du Développement durable, de l’Environnement et de la Lutte contre les changements climatiques (FTP) (in French). (To view documents see Help:FTP)
- Depeyre, Michèle; Gauthier, Michel (2005), "Chute MacDonald" (PDF), Guide des Chutes du Québec (in French), Les Éditions Tricycle, ISBN 2-922072-30-4
- Forêt ancienne du Lac-Larry (PDF) (in French), Ministere des Ressources naturelles et de la Faune, Quebec, archived from the original (PDF) on 2022-01-21
- Lac Jumbo, Commission de toponymie de Quebec
- "Lac Jumbo", Mapcarta
- "Lac Quatre Lieues", Geonames
- Lac Valilée (carte) (PDF) (in French), Ressources naturelles et Faune Quebec
- Leclerc, Richard (September–October 1988), "L'infrastructure ferroviaire du Québec-Labrador", Annales de Géographie, 97e Année (543), Armand Colin: 578–592, JSTOR 23452368
- NASA Earth Observations Data Set Index, NASA, archived from the original on 2020-04-16
- Peel, MC; Finlayson, BL; McMahon, TA (2007), "Updated world map of the Köppen-Geiger climate classification", Hydrology and Earth System Sciences, 11 (5): 1633–1644, doi:10.5194/hess-11-1633-2007
- Portrait du bassin versant aux Rochers (PDF) (in French), OBV Duplessis
- Projet de parc national du Lac-Walker (carte) (PDF) (in French), Ministère des Forêts, de la Faune et des Parcs, 2015, archived from the original (PDF) on 2018-12-28
- Projet de parc national (in French), MRC de Sept-Rivières
- Réserve faunique de Port‑Cartier–Sept‑Îles, Portrait, Sépaq
- Rivière MacDonald, Ressources naturelles Canada
- Rivière MacDonald (in French), Commission de toponymie de Quebec
- Rivière MacDonald, Natural Resources Canada
- Rivière Ronald (in French), Commission de toponymie de Quebec
- Salmon sportfishing in Québec (in French), Ministère des Ressources naturelles et de la Faune, 2006
- Saucier, J.-P.; Robitaille, A.; Grondin, P.; Bergeron, J.-F.; Gosselin, J. (2011), Les régions écologiques du Québec méridional (PDF) (map), 4 (in French), Ministère des Ressources naturelles et de la Faune, archived from the original (PDF) on 2020-06-19
- St-Pierre, Jean (7 May 2019), "De "petits pas" vers un parc national au lac Walker", Ma Côte-Nord (in French)
- Tucker, Helen G. (April 1992), "The Cartier Railway Company" (PDF), Branchline, 31 (4), ISSN 0824-233X
- Zone de Chasse : 1 (Chalet 15 jours au lac Walker) (PDF), Port-Cartier–Sept-Îles Wildlife Reserve
