= Gravel River (Quebec) =

- Location within Quebec
- Native name: Rivière Gravel (French)

Location
- Country: Canada
- Province: Quebec
- Administrative region: Côte-Nord
- RCM: Sept-Rivières
- Unorg. Territory: Lac-Walker

Physical characteristics
- Mouth
  - location: Aux Rochers River
  - coordinates: 50°25′51″N 67°10′42″W
- Basin size: 939.3 km^{2} (362.7 sq mi)

Basin features
- River system: Aux Rochers River
- Tributaries
  - left: Petite rivière Gravel
- NRC id: EIQAA

The Gravel River (French: Rivière Gravel) is a river in Quebec, Canada, to the north of the lower St. Lawrence River. It is a tributary of the Aux Rochers River in the Lac-Walker territory of Côte-Nord.

== Location ==
The Gravel River is in Lac-Walker, Sept-Rivières in the Côte-Nord region of Quebec. The name of the river, Rivière Gravel, was made official by the Commission de toponymie du Québec on 25 February 1976. For most of its length the river flows south through the Port-Cartier–Sept-Îles Wildlife Reserve.

A map of the proposed Lake Walker National Park shows the river entering the park near Lake Goéland and flowing south with a meandering course to the north end of Lake Walker, roughly parallel with the Schmon River.

== Course ==
The Gravel is one of the main tributaries of the Aux Rochers River, the others being the MacDonald, Pasteur and Schmon. It drains a basin of 939.3 km^{2} (362.7 sq mi). During deglaciation the ice in the Schmon and Gravel river valleys was probably slow to melt, then poured their water into Lake Walker. The high waters of this period were the source of much of the material in the meanders of the river, although other material comes from erosion of the valley slopes, banks and bed.

Within the proposed park, the river's valley flows north northeast-south southwest for about 12 km (7.5 mi) before entering Lake Walker. It has a trough-shaped cross-section. The valley has an irregular profile along its length, with some glacial locks, or riegels. Upstream of the locks are glacial umbilicals filled with glaciofluvial sediments. In the Lake Ulysse-Morin sector the river is fed by a series of parallel tributaries down to the point where it meets the Petite Gravel River, after which the valley broadens out and the river flows quietly, with many meanders. This is an area of great natural beauty.

== Environment ==
A map of the Ecological regions of Quebec shows the river rising and flowing south through the eastern spruce/moss domain of the boreal zone.

== Lakes ==
Some of the lakes in the Gravel River basin are:

Lake	Coordinates	Reference
Lac Trouvé	51°05′06″N 67°17′22″W	
Lac aux Chiens	50°59′21″N 67°15′57″W	
Grand lac du Nord	50°54′12″N 67°05′18″W	
Petit lac du Nord	50°49′41″N 67°08′42″W	
Lac Harbour	50°50′48″N 67°12′44″W	
Lac Hervieux	50°45′32″N 67°07′56″W	
Lac du Rat Musqué	50°40′02″N 67°10′14″W	
Petit lac des Noyés	50°38′21″N 67°09′28″W	
Lac Ulyesse-Morin	50°33′57″N 67°10′31″W	
Petite rivière Gravel (50°31′29″N 67°09′27″W)
Lake	Coordinates	Reference
Lac Adams	50°47′46″N 67°01′23″W	
Lac Large	50°43′07″N 66°56′45″W	
Lac Travers	50°42′33″N 67°03′28″W	
Lac Bouchard	50°39′12″N 67°04′20″W	
Lac Goéland	50°34′53″N 67°08′18″W	

== Sources ==
- Bellavance, Denis (2018). "Projet de parc national du Lac-Walker, Descriptions géologiques, géomorphologiques et sites d'intérêt" (PDF). Équipe écologie et territoire, Direction de l’expertise en biodiversité, Ministère du Développement durable, de l’Environnement et de la Lutte contre les changements climatiques (FTP) (in French). (To view documents see Help:FTP)
- Portrait du bassin versant aux Rochers (PDF) (in French), OBV Duplessis
- Projet de parc national du Lac-Walker (carte) (PDF) (in French), Ministère des Forêts, de la Faune et des Parcs, 2015, archived from the original (PDF) on 2018-12-28
- Rivière Gravel (in French), Commission de toponymie du Québec
- Rivière Gravel (in French), Ressources naturelles Canada
- Saucier, J.-P.; Robitaille, A.; Grondin, P.; Bergeron, J.-F.; Gosselin, J. (2011), Les régions écologiques du Québec méridional (PDF) (map), 4 (in French), Ministère des Ressources naturelles et de la Faune, archived from the original (PDF) on 2020-06-19
