= Lake Pasteur =

Lake in Quebec, Canada

- Lac Pasteur (French)
- Location within Quebec
- Coordinates: 50.2428°N 66.9647°W
- Max. length: 21 kilometres (13 mi)
- Max. width: < 1 kilometre (0.62 mi)
- Surface area: 18.8 square kilometres (7.3 sq mi)
- Surface elevation: 83 metres (272 ft)

Lake Pasteur (French: Lac Pasteur) is a long and narrow fjord-like lake in the Côte-Nord region of Quebec, Canada.

== Location ==
Lake Pasteur is 21 kilometres (13 mi) long and less than 1,000 metres (3,300 ft) wide, with an area of 18.8 square kilometres (7.3 sq mi). Its surface elevation is 83 metres (272 ft) above sea level. The lake is extremely elongated, as are Lake Walker and Lake Quatre Lieues in the same watershed. The Pasteur River enters the north end of the lake, and leaves the south end to join the Aux Rochers River.

Lake Pasteur is in the unorganized territory of Lac-Walker, in the Sept-Rivières Regional County Municipality. The lake is about 10 kilometres (6.2 mi) north of Shelter Bay, now Port-Cartier, on the shore of the Gulf of Saint Lawrence. Its name is mentioned in the Dictionnaire des rivières et des lacs de la province de Québec (Dictionary of Rivers and Lakes of the Province of Quebec) in 1925. It was named after the French chemist and biologist Louis Pasteur (1822–1895), who discovered microbial life and invented pasteurization.

== Environment ==
The lake is in the proposed Lake Pasteur Biodiversity Reserve, in the Sainte Marguerite Plateau, a natural region in the Central Laurentian natural province. The terrain is hilly, covered with glacial till. A map of the Ecological regions of Quebec shows the area of the reserve belongs to the eastern spruce/moss domain of the boreal zone. The average annual temperature in the region is 0 °C (32 °F). The warmest month is July, when the average temperature is 16 °C (61 °F), and the coldest is January, with −16 °C (3 °F).

== Sediment ==
A study of short gravity core samples along transects in the nearby fjord-lakes Pasteur, Walker and Pentecôte, published in 2018, evaluated the distribution of laminated post-glacial segments and the potential for formation of annual sedimentary layers, or varves. Four main types of sedimentary facies were identified: laminated, partially laminated, bioturbated and massive sediments. Lake Pentecôte mainly holds massive, partially laminated sediments. Lake Pasteur holds partially laminated sediments and non-annual sediments similar to varves. Lake Walker holds laminated sediments that probably are varves. The difference is probably due to the greater depth of Lake Walker, among other factors.

== History ==
In November 1922 there was a deadly boating accident on the lake when the schooner Amoria was holed by early ice formed on the lake and sank. Ten people died, including Father Auguste Tortellier and Doctor Roméo Vézina.

== Sources ==
- Lac Pasteur (in French), Commission de toponymie du Québec
- "Lac Pasteur", Mapcarta
- Lac Pasteur, Natural Resources Canada
- NASA Earth Observations Data Set Index, NASA, archived from the original on 2015-03-06
- Nzekwe, Obinna P.; Francus, Pierre; St-Onge, Guillaume; Lajeunesse, Patrick; Fortin, David; Gagnon-Poire, Antoine (1 February 2018), "Recent sedimentation in three adjacent fjord-lakes on the Quebec North Shore (eastern Canada): facies analysis, laminae preservation, and potential for varve formation", Canadian Journal of Earth Sciences, 55 (2), NRC Research Press
- Plan de conservation, Réserve de biodiversité projetée du lac Pasteur (PDF) (in French), Quebec, September 2008
- "Port-Cartier (municipalité de ville) Éphémérides", Mémoire du Québec (in French)
- Portrait du bassin versant aux Rochers (PDF) (in French), OBV Duplessis
- Saucier, J.-P.; Robitaille, A.; Grondin, P.; Bergeron, J.-F.; Gosselin, J. (2011), Les régions écologiques du Québec méridional (PDF) (map), 4 (in French), Ministère des Ressources naturelles et de la Faune, archived from the original (PDF) on 2020-06-19
