= Forêt ancienne du Lac-Larry =

- IUCN category III (natural monument or feature)
- Location within Quebec
- Location: Lac-Walker, Côte-Nord, Quebec, Canada
- Coordinates: 50.269°N 67.318°W
- Established: 2005
- Administrator: Ministry of Energy and Natural Resources

The Forêt ancienne du Lac-Larry is a protected area of old growth coniferous forest in the unorganized territory of Lac-Waker, in the Sept-Rivières Regional County Municipality, in administrative region of Côte-Nord, in the province of Quebec, Canada.

== Location ==
The Forêt ancienne du lac Larry is one of two protected areas in the watershed of the Aux Rochers River, the other being the proposed Pasteur Lake Biodiversity Reserve. The watershed is almost all contained in the Port-Cartier–Sept-Îles Wildlife Preserve. The Larry Lake Old Forest is located between the Ronald and MacDonald Rivers. It covers an area of 8.33 square kilometres (3.22 sq mi).

The region has rugged terrain, including high hills with flat summits. The old forest grows on medium or steep slopes in shallow soil. The map shows that the forest borders Larry Lake and Jumbo Lake, and extends to the north and east of these lakes. It contains parts of other, unnamed water bodies.

== Conservation status ==
The protected area was established in 2005, and is an IUCN protected area category III exceptional forest ecosystem. It is managed by the Ministry of Energy and Natural Resources. The forest received a national designation as an old-growth forest in 2005. It is in the Duplessis integrated watershed management area (GIEBV).

The forest is among the major natural attractions that would be included in the proposed Lake Walker National Park, the others being Lake Walker, Lake Quatre Lieues, MacDonald Falls and Aux Rochers River. The study of the park area by the Forest, Wildlife and Parks department was filed in 2018, but as of May 2009 the park proposal was waiting for funding.

== Vegetation ==
The Lac-Larry old growth forest consists mainly of Picea mariana (black spruce) and fir trees. Most of the dominant trees are more than 200 years old, and the oldest are around 250 years old. The forest has not suffered seriously from fires, insect infestations or windstorms, and has never been disturbed by human activities. It has evolved naturally and has characteristics typical of old growth forest including abundant Abies balsamea (balsam fir), with trees of varying ages and sizes, including very old trees. The forest is renewed naturally by gaps created in the canopy by small windfalls, a process that has probably been continuing for many years before the oldest trees took root. Due to the natural environment, even the oldest trees are relatively small, at no more than 20 metres (66 ft) high and 30 centimetres (12 in) in trunk diameter. However, some Picea glauca (white spruce) are 30 metres (98 ft) high with diameters of 40 centimetres (16 in).

The forest also contains spruce and sphagnum in the wetlands, and white spruce and Abies concolor (white fir) on the richest soil, often found at the foot of slopes and along the many streams that run through the area. The undergrowth is not rich in species. It includes hypnaceae mosses and common taiga broadleaf plants such as Cornus canadensis (bunchberry) and Linnaea borealis (twinflower). There are small patches of Amelanchier alnifolia (Saskatoon berries).

== Sources ==
- "5. Portrait du bassin versant aux Rochers" (PDF), Bassins versants (in French), Organisme de bassins versants Duplessis
- "Analyse des bassins versants", Plan Directeur de l'Eau de Duplessis (PDF) (in French), Organisme de bassins versants Duplessis, archived from the original (PDF) on 2019-09-02
- "Forêt ancienne du Lac-Larry" (PDF), Écosystèmes forestiers exceptioneis (in French), Ministère des Ressources naturelles et de la Faune, March 2005, archived from the original (PDF) on 2022-01-21
- Forêt ancienne du Lac-Larry in Canada, Protected Planet
- Projet de parc national (in French), MRC de Sept-Rivières
- St-Pierre, Jean (7 May 2019), "De "petits pas" vers un parc national au lac Walker", Ma Côte-Nord (in French)
