= Lake Quatre Lieues =

Lake in the province of Quebec, Canada

- Lac Quatre Lieues (French)
- Location within Quebec
- Location: Lac-Walker, Côte-Nord, Quebec
- Coordinates: 50.107395°N 67.141997°W
- Surface elevation: 116 metres (381 ft)
- References: EHTVV

Lake Quatre Lieues (French: Lac Quatre Lieues, pronounced [lak katʁ ljø], Four-League Lake) is a lake in the province of Quebec, Canada. It is set in a wilderness area and may be used for relaxation, fishing or hunting.

== Name ==
The name Quatre Lieues refers to the location of the lake, which is four leagues, or 8 kilometres (5.0 mi) to the west of Shelter Bay, Quebec.

== Location ==
Lake Quatre Lieues is in the unorganized territory of Lac-Walker in the Sept-Rivières Regional County Municipality of the Côte-Nord administrative region of Quebec. It is in the extreme south of the proposed Lake Walker National Park. The MacDonald River flows through the northern end of Lake Quatre Lieues and continues east to join the Aux Rochers River to the south of Lake Walker. The lake is about 116 metres (381 ft) above sea level.

The northern part of the lake is 4.8 kilometres (3.0 mi) long and 390 metres (1,280 ft) wide. It lies in a slender lacustrine basin 5.2 kilometres (3.2 mi) long by 2 kilometres (1.2 mi) wide with bays and sandbanks, an extension of the Lake Walker basin. The surrounding terraces are formed of sandy materials of deltaic origin. These deposits were laid down during glacial decay in the Holocene. The southern extension forms a narrow and winding basin 16 kilometres (9.9 mi) long cut into the plateau.

The Cartier Railway owned by ArcelorMittal runs along the northeast shore of the lake before turning west along the MacDonald River valley. The railway links the Mont Wright iron mine near Fermont to Port-Cartier.

== Environment ==
NASA images indicate that the lake is in a region mostly covered in coniferous forests. The district is in the boreal climate zone under the Köppen climate classification. A map of the Ecological regions of Quebec places the lake in the 6J-T ecological subregion, part of the eastern spruce/moss domain of the boreal zone. The average annual temperature in the region is 0 °C (32 °F). The warmest month is July, when the average temperature is 16 °C (61 °F) and the coldest is January with an average of −17 °C (1 °F). Average annual rainfall is 1,014 millimetres (39.9 in), of which 361.5 millimetres (14.23 in) falls as snow.

== Visiting ==
The lake is a magnificent place for relaxation, fishing, hunting and boating. The Port-Cartier–Sept-Îles Wildlife Reserve offers chalet rentals for hunting and fishing in the Quatre-lieues area. The hunting area is about 150 square kilometres (58 sq mi) with hardwood forests about 50 years old and mature spruce. In 2013 fishing for atlantic salmon was prohibited. Angling or fly fishing for other species was allowed from 11 May 2012 to 3 September 2012.

== Sources ==
- Bellavance, Denis (2018). "Projet de parc national du Lac-Walker, Descriptions géologiques, géomorphologiques et sites d'intérêt" (PDF). Équipe écologie et territoire, Direction de l’expertise en biodiversité, Ministère du Développement durable, de l’Environnement et de la Lutte contre les changements climatiques (FTP) (in French). (To view documents see Help:FTP)
- Fishing period Zone 19 North, MRNF
- Lac Quatre Lieues (in French), Commission de toponymie du Québec
- "Lac Quatre Lieues", Geonames
- Lac Quatre Lieues, Natural Resources Canada
- NASA Earth Observations Data Set Index, NASA, archived from the original on 7 April 2019
- NASA Earth Observations: Land Cover Classification, NASA/MODIS, archived from the original on 28 February 2016
- Peel, M. C.; Finlayson, B. L.; McMahon, T. A. (2007). "Updated world map of the Köppen-Geiger climate classification" (PDF). Hydrology and Earth System Sciences. 11 (5): 1633–1644. Bibcode:2007HESS...11.1633P. doi:10.5194/hess-11-1633-2007. Archived (PDF) from the original on 2019-12-02.
- Saucier, J.-P.; Robitaille, A.; Grondin, P.; Bergeron, J.-F.; Gosselin, J. (2011), Les régions écologiques du Québec méridional (PDF) (map), 4 (in French), Ministère des Ressources naturelles et de la Faune, archived from the original (PDF) on 2020-06-19
- Zone de Chasse : 1 (Chalet 15 jours au lac Walker) (PDF), Port-Cartier–Sept-Îles Wildlife Reserve, archived from the original (PDF) on 2018-12-26
