= Dominique River =

Dominique River Rivière Dominique
- Location within Quebec

Location
- Country: Canada
- Province: Quebec
- Region: Côte-Nord
- RCM: Sept-Rivières

Physical characteristics
- Source
  - elevation: 201 metres (659 ft)
- Mouth: Gulf of Saint Lawrence
  - coordinates: 50.0263889°N 66.8680556°W
  - elevation: 0 metres (0 ft)
- Length: 50 kilometres (31 mi)
- Basin size: 263 square kilometres (102 sq mi)

The Dominique River (French: Rivière Dominique) is a river in the Côte-Nord region of Quebec, Canada. It empties into the Gulf of Saint Lawrence.

== Location ==
The Dominique river runs from north to south for 50 kilometres (31 mi) with a vertical drop of 201 metres (659 ft). It has one important tributary, the Foins River (Hay River), which drains the southeast of the basin. The mouth of the river is in the municipality of Port-Cartier in the Sept-Rivières Regional County Municipality. At its mouth in the city of Port-Cartier the river converges with an arm of the Aux Rochers River in the Rivière-aux-Rochers Park. A trail in the park leads to the Rivière Dominique waterfall.

The origin of the name, which was made official on 5 December 1968, is not known.

== Basin ==
The Dominique River basin is oriented from north to south, about 42 kilometres (26 mi) long and no more than 12 kilometres (7.5 mi) wide. It covers 263 square kilometres (102 sq mi). It lies between the basins of the Aux Rochers River to the west and the Sainte-Marguerite River to the east. The river basin is in the Sept-Rivières Regional County Municipality, divided between the unorganized territory of Lac-Walker (65.8%) and the town of Port-Cartier (34.2%). Part of the river basin is in the Port-Cartier–Sept-Îles Wildlife Reserve (Réserve faunique Port-Cartier–Sept-Îles). Part is in the proposed Lake Pasteur Biodiversity Reserve.

== Terrain ==
The northern part of the Dominique River basin is on a deeply dissected rocky plateau in which slopes can rise by 300 metres (980 ft). The highest point is 533 metres (1,749 ft) in the north of the basin. The piedmont region extends for 15 kilometres (9.3 mi) between the plateau and the coastal plain. It is formed of rounded rocky hills up to 300 metres (980 ft) high. The coastal plain is a strip of fairly flat land about 9 kilometres (5.6 mi) wide that gradually slopes down to sea level from 100 metres (330 ft) in the north.

The bedrock is dominated by magmatic rocks, deformed to some extent, of migmatite, granitoid rocks and granitic gneiss. The plateau and piedmont area include vast areas where the bedrock is exposed. In other places there is glacial till of up to 2 metres (6 ft 7 in) in depth, and in the main valleys there are large glaciofluvial sediments. In the coastal plain the Goldthwait Sea deposited large amounts of clay and silt sediment as it followed the retreat of the glaciers after the last ice age. As the land rebounded from the weight of the ice, the sea retreated and the marine sediments were covered by coarser sandy estuarine and deltaic sediments.

== Hydrology ==
Waterbodies cover 5.72% of the Dominique River basin. The main lakes are Lake Morin at 6.37 square kilometres (2.46 sq mi) and Little Lake Anguille at 2.58 square kilometres (1.00 sq mi). Ombrotrophic peatlands cover 6.15% of the basin, mostly on the coastal plain where the flat relief and fine sediments retain the water. The rivers and streams follow angular courses dictated by fractures in the hard bedrock. Upstream the rivers follow rather rectilinear courses through narrow valleys, but downstream they meander slightly through the loose deposits of the coastal plain. The annual average flow at the Dominique River mouth is estimated at 9.3 cubic metres per second (330 cu ft/s), varying during the year from 1.97 to 22.1 cubic metres per second (70 to 780 cu ft/s).

== Environment ==
The Pentecôte weather station, 35 kilometres (22 mi) to the southwest of the river mouth, records an average annual temperature of 1.9 °C (35.4 °F) and annual average rainfall of 1,154 millimetres (45.4 in). A map of the ecological regions of Quebec shows the upper and central Dominique River in sub-regions 6j-T and 6m-T of the east spruce/moss subdomain, and the lower part in sub-region 5g-T of the eastern fir/white birch subdomain.. On the coastal plain the forest cover is dominated by stands of balsam fir (Abies balsamea), white spruce (Picea glauca) and paper birch (Betula papyrifera), with lesser numbers of jack pine (Pinus banksiana), larch and trembling aspen (Populus tremuloides). Further inland in the spruce-moss region the forest cover is dominated by black spruce (Picea mariana), with balsam fir and, to a lesser extent, hardwoods such as paper birch, trembling aspen and balsam poplar (Populus balsamifera). Fish species are American eel (Anguilla rostrata) and brook trout (Salvelinus fontinalis). There are rainbow smelt (Osmerus mordax) at the mouth of the river. The Dominique River is not recognized as an Atlantic salmon river.

== Conservation ==
The watershed is almost entirely contained in the Port-Cartier–Sept-Îles Wildlife Reserve. This reserve, with a total area of 6,423 square kilometres (2,480 sq mi), covers 224 square kilometres (86 sq mi) of the Dominique River basin, or about 87.5%. The proposed Lake Pasteur Biodiversity Reserve extends into the west of the watershed. It is a protected area under IUCN category III, established in 2003. The proposed reserve covers a total area of 634.4 square kilometres (244.9 sq mi) of which 45.9 square kilometres (17.7 sq mi) are in the Dominique watershed, covering 18.0% of its area including Lake Morin and Little Lake Anguille. On the Gulf of St. Lawrence the river basin adjoins the Port-Cartier West Waterfowl Concentration Area (IUCN category VI).

== Sources ==
- Portrait du bassin versant Dominique (PDF) (in French), OBV Duplessis
- Portrait préliminaire de la zone de gestion intégrée de l'eau par bassin versant Duplessis (PDF) (in French), OBV Duplessis, April 2015
- "Rivière-aux-Rochers Park and Salmon Ladder", QuébecOriginal
- Rivière Dominique (in French), Commission de toponymie du Québec
- Rivière Dominique (in French), Ressources naturelles Canada
- Saucier, J.-P.; Robitaille, A.; Grondin, P.; Bergeron, J.-F.; Gosselin, J. (2011), Les régions écologiques du Québec méridional (PDF) (map), 4 (in French), Ministère des Ressources naturelles et de la Faune, archived from the original (PDF) on 2020-06-19
