= Lake Walker National Park =

National park in Canada

- Parc national du Lac Walker
- IUCN category II (national park)
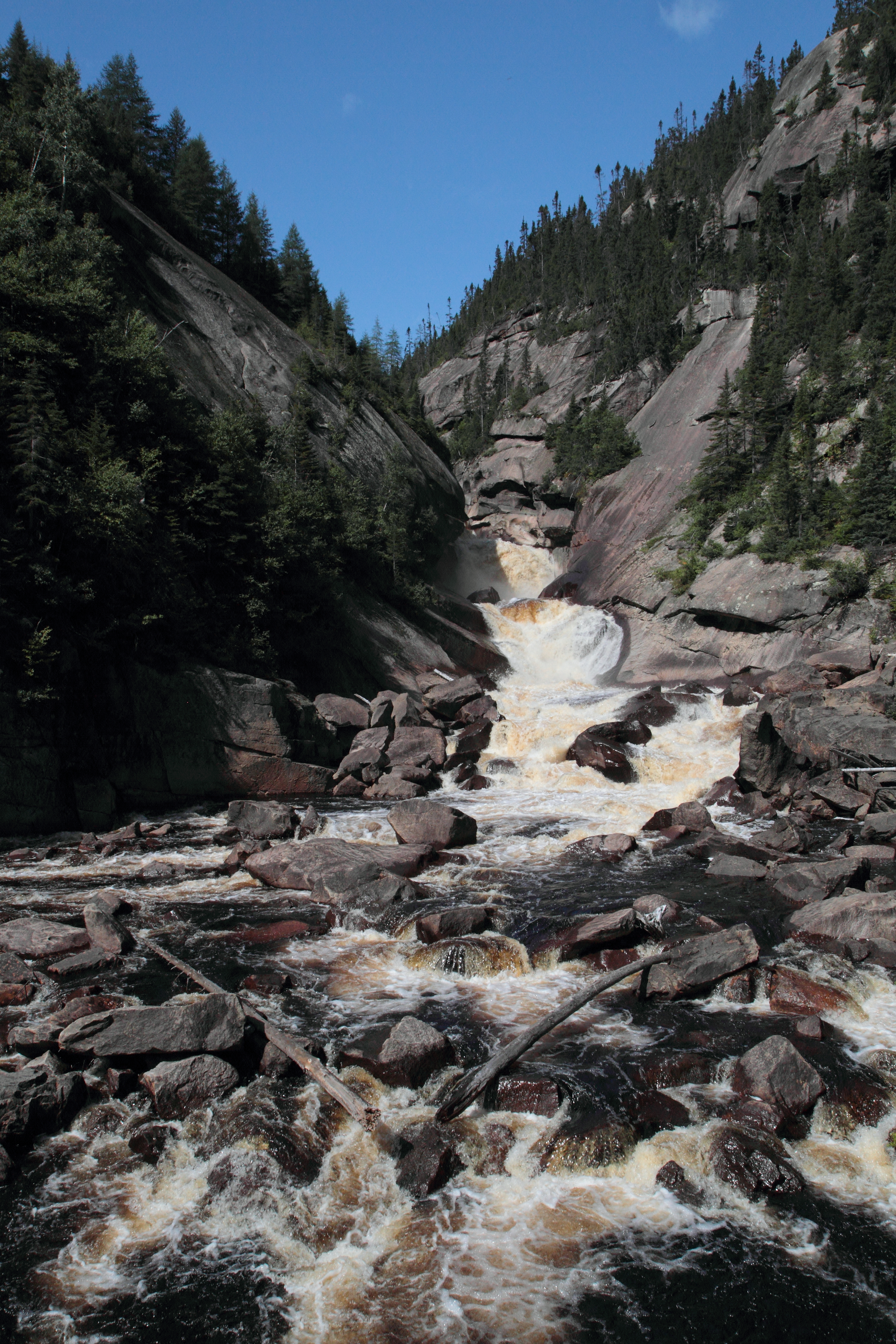
- Chute MacDonald

- Location within Quebec
- Interactive map of Lake Walker National Park
- Location: Quebec, Canada
- Nearest city: Sept-Rivières Regional County Municipality
- Coordinates: 50.289659°N 67.160911°W

Lake Walker National Park (French: Parc national du Lac Walker) is a proposed national park in the province of Quebec, Canada, centered on the 33 kilometres (21 mi) long Lake Walker.

== Location ==
The proposed park is in a region of taiga in the center of the Port-Cartier–Sept-Îles Wildlife Reserve. It is about 30 kilometres (19 mi) from the town of Port-Cartier. It would cover an area of 1,479 square kilometres (571 sq mi) in the Côte-Nord administrative region.

== Environment ==
The region has high hills cut by deep glacial valleys running between rocky escarpments. There are many streams and lakes of all sizes in the territory, including the Schmon, Gravel, Pasteur and MacDonald rivers, which meander through wide glacial valleys. Lake Walker is 33 kilometres (21 mi) long and resembles a fjord. In places the cliffs along the lakeside are over 200 metres (660 ft) high, and in places it is 280 metres (920 ft) deep, making it the deepest lake in Quebec. Other attractions of the park would be the Lake Larry Old Growth Forest and the MacDonald and Cody Falls.

== Process ==
The Sept-Rivières Regional County Municipality and the economic corporation of that city began working on the concept of creating a national park within Sépaq's Réserve faunique Port-Cartier/Sept-Îles in 2006. The project would involve addition of campsites, cottages and other tourist facilities.

The Department of Biodiversity Expertise of Quebec's Ministry of Sustainable Development, Environment, and Fight Against Climate Change (MDDELCC) produced a report in July 2018 to support the National Parks Directorate (NDP) of the Ministry of Forests, Wildlife and Parks (MFFP) in preparing their report on the park. The MDDELCC report describes the main geological and geomorphological features of the territory, areas of geomorphological interest for study and education, and the typical natural characteristics of the region. In 2018 the Ministry of Forests, Wildlife and Parks submitted a descriptive study.

As of May 2019 the project had not been funded, and was waiting on a decision by Pierre Dufour, the Minister of Forests, Wildlife and Parks.

== Waterbodies ==
A map of the proposed park shows the MacDonald River and Aux Rochers River along its western and southern border, the Ronald River in the southwest, the Schmon River, Gravel River and Little Gravel River flowing through the park from the north, and the Pasteur and Aux Foins rivers leaving the park from the south to join the Aux Rochers River.

Apart from Lake Walker, lakes include Lake Quatre Lieues in the extreme south, Lake Jumbo, Lake Larry and Lake Cody in the southwest, Lake David, Lake Chisholm, Lake Ovide, Lake Saint Joseph and Lake Provencher in the northwest, Lake Goéland, Lake Gagné, Lake Chassé and Lake Lelièvre in the north east, and Lake Atanache, Lake Pineault, Lake Chevarie, Lake Truite, Lake Arsenault, Lake Carter, Lake Carré, Lake Pasteur, Little Anguille Lake and Lake Morin in the southeast.

== Sources ==
- Bellavance, Denis (2018). "Projet de parc national du Lac-Walker, Descriptions géologiques, géomorphologiques et sites d'intérêt" (PDF). Équipe écologie et territoire, Direction de l’expertise en biodiversité, Ministère du Développement durable, de l’Environnement et de la Lutte contre les changements climatiques (FTP) (in French). (To view documents see Help:FTP)
- Projet de parc national du Lac Walker (in French), Gouvernement du Québec, 2018
- Projet de parc national du Lac-Walker (PDF) (Map) (in French), Gouvernement du Québec, 2015, archived from the original (PDF) on 2018-12-28
- St-Pierre, Jean (7 May 2019), "De "petits pas" vers un parc national au lac Walker", Ma Côte Nord (in French), Arsenal Media
