= Aux Rochers River =

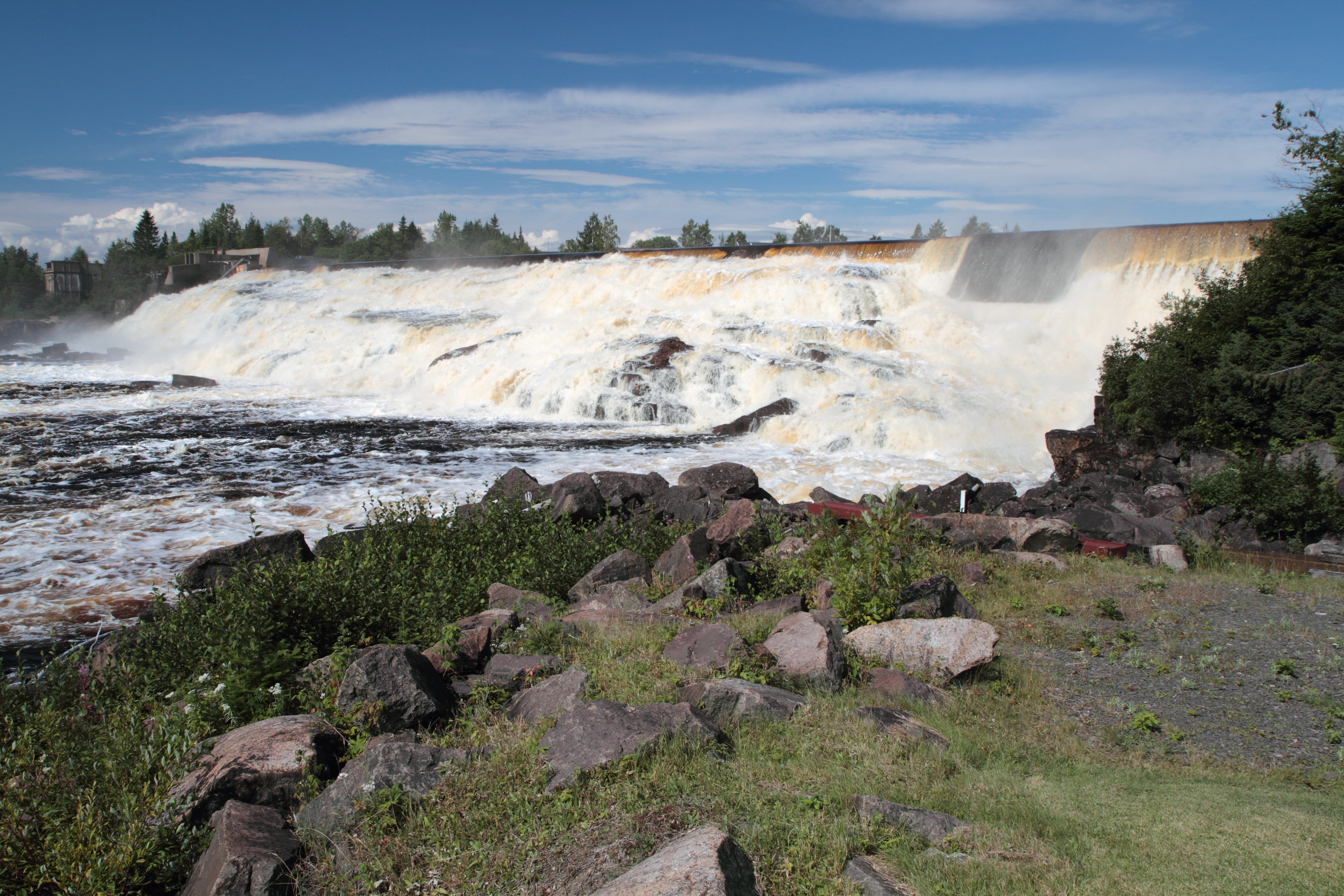
- The river in August 2012

- Location within Quebec
- Native name: Rivière aux Rochers (French)

Location
- Country: Canada
- Location: Sept-Rivières Regional County Municipality; Côte-Nord; Quebec

Physical characteristics
- Source
  - elevation: 585 m (1,919 ft)
- Mouth
  - location: Saint Lawrence River at Port-Cartier
  - elevation: 0 m (0 ft)
- Length: 30 km (19 mi)
- Basin size: 4,180 square kilometres (1,610 sq mi)

Basin features
- MNR Id: EHWSX

Aux Rochers River (French: Rivière aux Rochers, pronounced [ʁivjɛʁ o ʁɔʃe], Rocky River), is a river in Sept-Rivières Regional County Municipality, Côte-Nord, Quebec, Canada. It drains an area of 4,180 square kilometres (1,610 sq mi). It is a tributary of the Gulf of Saint Lawrence

== Description ==
The Aux Rochers River is in Port-Cartier, Sept-Rivières. It empties into the Gulf of Saint Lawrence in the town of Port-Cartier. One of its tributaries, the Gravel River, is sometimes also called the Aux Rochers River. The Gravel flows south to the long Lake Walker. The Aux Rochers River proper leaves the south end of Lake Walker and flows southeast for a further 30 kilometres (19 mi). The river is hard to navigate due to a strong current. It also contains many rocks, hence its name. Some of the smaller rocks move to different places in the river each year.

The lower river valley is used by southern section of the Cartier Railway, which then runs along the east shore of Lake Quatre Lieues before following the valley of the MacDonald River, a tributary of the Aux Rochers.

== Environment ==
A map of the Ecological regions of Quebec shows the river rising and flowing south through the eastern spruce/moss domain of the boreal zone. The last section of the river flows through the fir/white birch domain of the boreal zone.

== River basin ==
The Aux Rochers River basin is 135 kilometres (84 mi) long from north to south, and 53 kilometres (33 mi) wide from east to west. The basin covers 4,180 square kilometres (1,610 sq mi). It is bordered by the Sainte-Marguerite River basin to the east, the Pentecôte River basin to the west, and to the north by the Manicouagan integrated management region. The lower part of the river basin is bordered by the basin of the Dominique River to the east.

The coastal plain is up to 15 kilometres (9.3 mi) wide. Inland is an area with rounded rocky hills up to 400 metres (1,300 ft) high, extending north for 8 to 18 kilometres (5.0 to 11.2 mi). A highly dissected rocky plateau covers the remainder of the watershed. It has steep slopes that may rise for several hundred meters from the valley floors. The highest point in the watershed is in the north at 930 metres (3,050 ft).

The bedrock of the southern half of the watershed is relatively undeformed migmatite, a magmatic rock. The northern half has metamorphic rocks of magmatic and sedimentary origin, such as gneisses and paragneisses. The plateau and hills generally have thin soil with large areas of rocky outcroppings. There are areas of till less than 2 metres (6 ft 7 in) thick in the northern part, and the major valleys hold large deposits of glaciofluvial sediments. The coastal plain has large quantities of clay and silt sediments deposited when the Goldthwait Sea invaded after the retreat of the Laurentide Ice Sheet. When that sea in turn retreated it left a covering of coarse sandy estuarine and deltaic sediments.

== Rivers ==
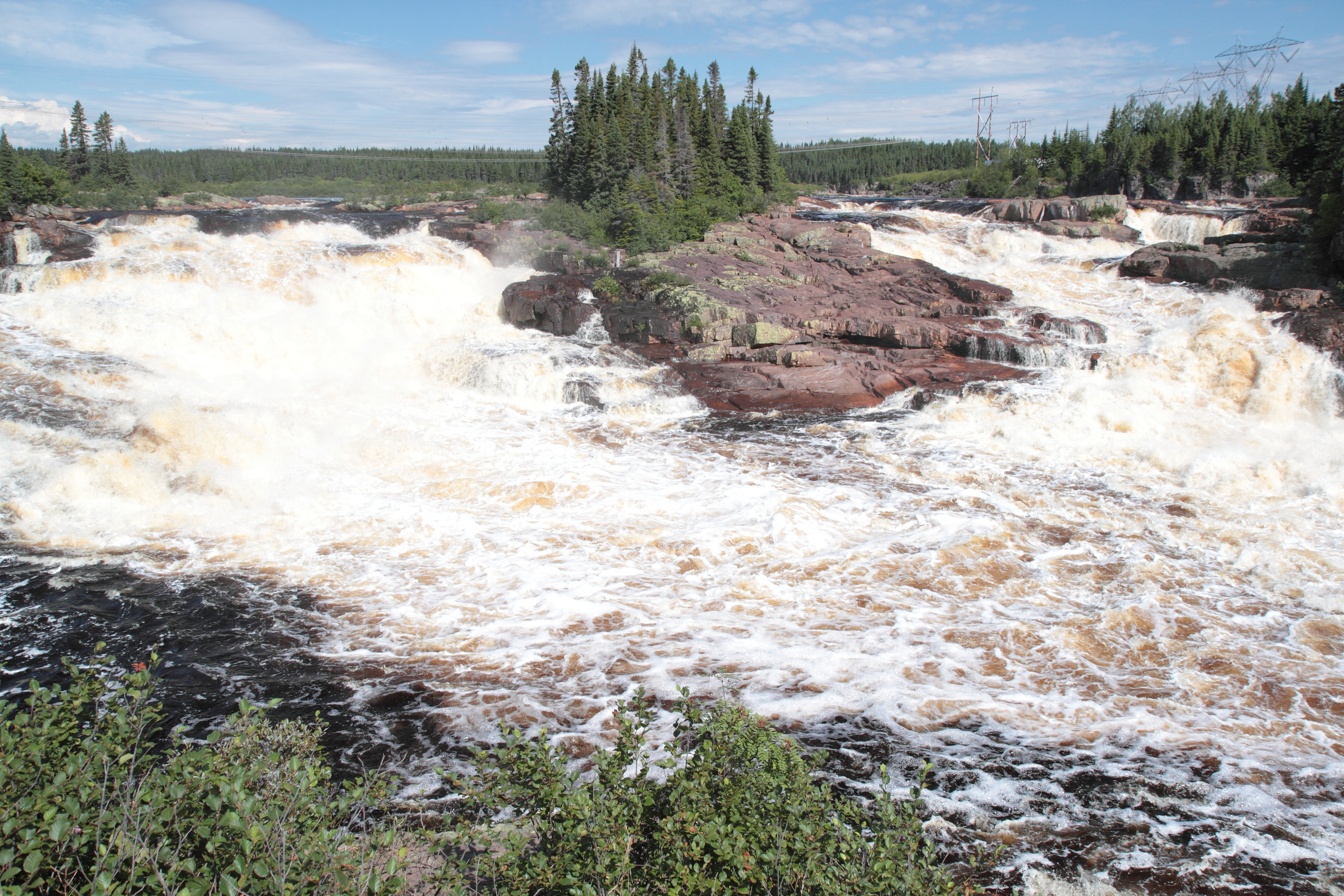

The Aux Rochers River and its longest tributary runs from north to south for a distance of 161 kilometres (100 mi), with a drop over this length of 585 metres (1,919 ft). The average annual flow at its mouth is about at 111 cubic metres per second (3,900 cu ft/s), ranging from a peak of 248 cubic metres per second (8,800 cu ft/s) to a minimum of 27.7 cubic metres per second (980 cu ft/s). On the coastal plain the Aux Rochers River meanders slightly, then follows a rectilinear course where it has cut into the layer of glaciomarine sediments.

The main tributaries are the Gravel, Schmon, Pasteur and MacDonald. Generally the rivers have angular courses, since their valleys follow the network of fractures of the bedrock. However, some rivers meander through their alluvial sediments in wide valleys in the center of the watershed. Falls include the Noyés Falls at 1.5 kilometres (0.93 mi) from the mouth of the Aux Rochers, the MacDonald Falls on the MacDonald River and the Tibasse Falls on a tributary of the Pasteur.

== Lakes ==
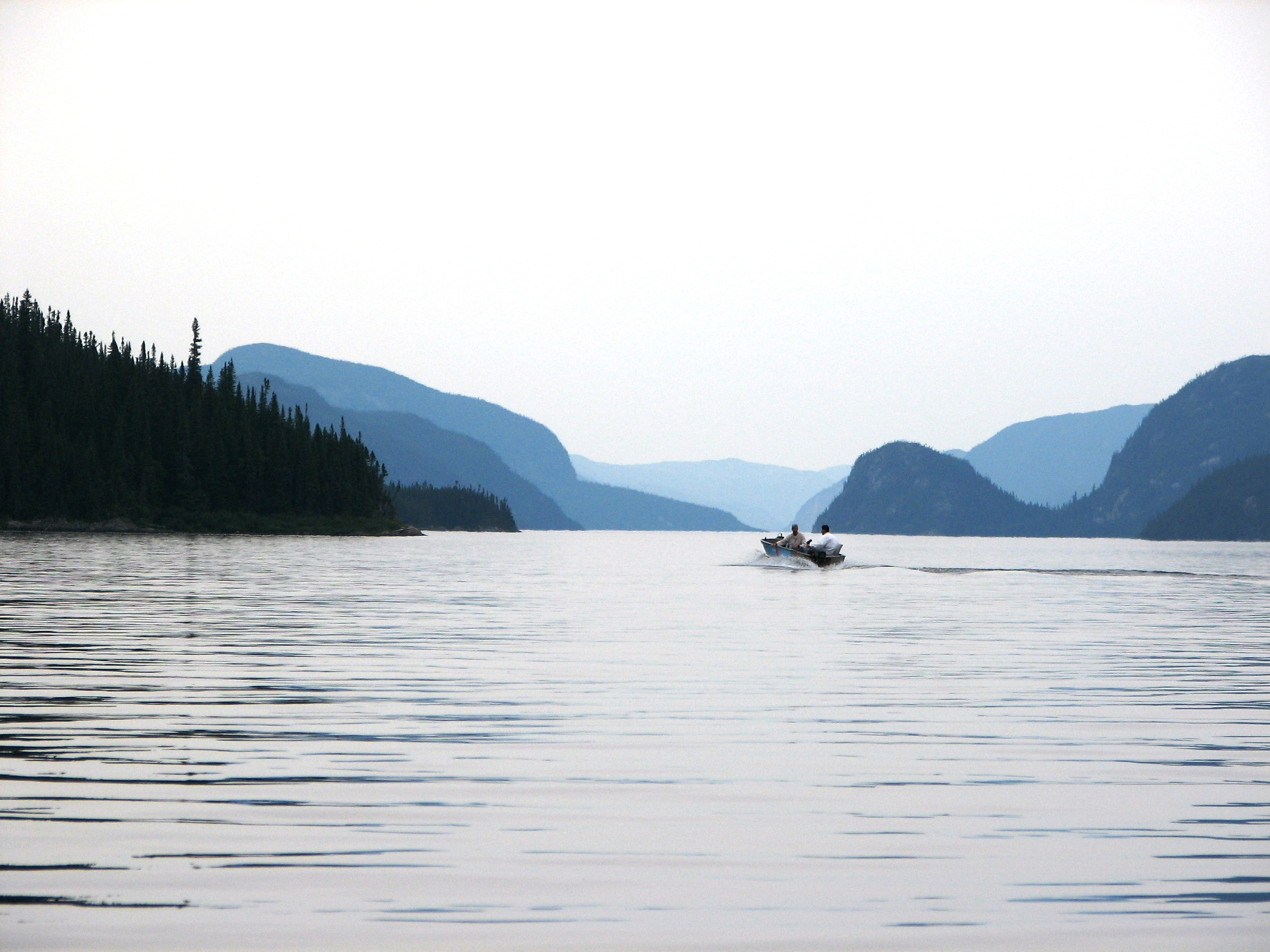
Lake Walker

There are many large lakes on the plateau and in the foothills. In the southern half of the watershed the highly elongated Lake Walker is almost 32 kilometres (20 mi) long. There are two other elongated lakes in the southern part of the basin. Lake Pasteur is 21 by 1 kilometre (13.05 by 0.62 mi) and Lake Quatre Lieues is 15 by 0.5 kilometres (9.32 by 0.31 mi). In total, lakes cover 8.46% of the watershed. Wetlands cover 0.71% of watershed, mainly on the coastal plain with its flat relief and fine sediments.

Large lakes include:

Lake	Area		Coords	Map
Lake	km^{2}	sqmi	Coords	Map
Grand lac du Nord	14.8	5.7	50.9033°N 67.0883°W	EHKXC
Petit lac du Nord	13.6	5.3	50.8280°N 67.1450°W	EHKXE
Lac du Nord-Est	11.1	4.3	50.7325°N 67.4552°W	EHKYC
Lake Pasteur	18.8	7.3	50.2427°N 66.9647°W	EHODC
Lake Quatre Lieues	4.8	1.9	50.0566°N 67.1500°W	EHTVV
Lake Walker	42.5	16.4	50.3033°N 67.1566°W	EIMFM

=== Lake Walker ===
In the southern half of the watershed Lake Walker covers 42.5 square kilometres (16.4 sq mi). It is almost 32 kilometres (20 mi) long and under 2 kilometres (1.2 mi) wide. It was formed by the flooding of an old trough-shaped glacial valley with very steep slopes that rise by over 400 metres (1,300 ft) in places. It is 280 metres (920 ft) deep, making it the deepest lake in Quebec. Since 2006 it has been proposed to establish the Lake Walker National Park within the wildlife sanctuary, surrounding Lake Walker. As of May 2019 the project was stalled for lack of funding.

== As a visitor attraction ==
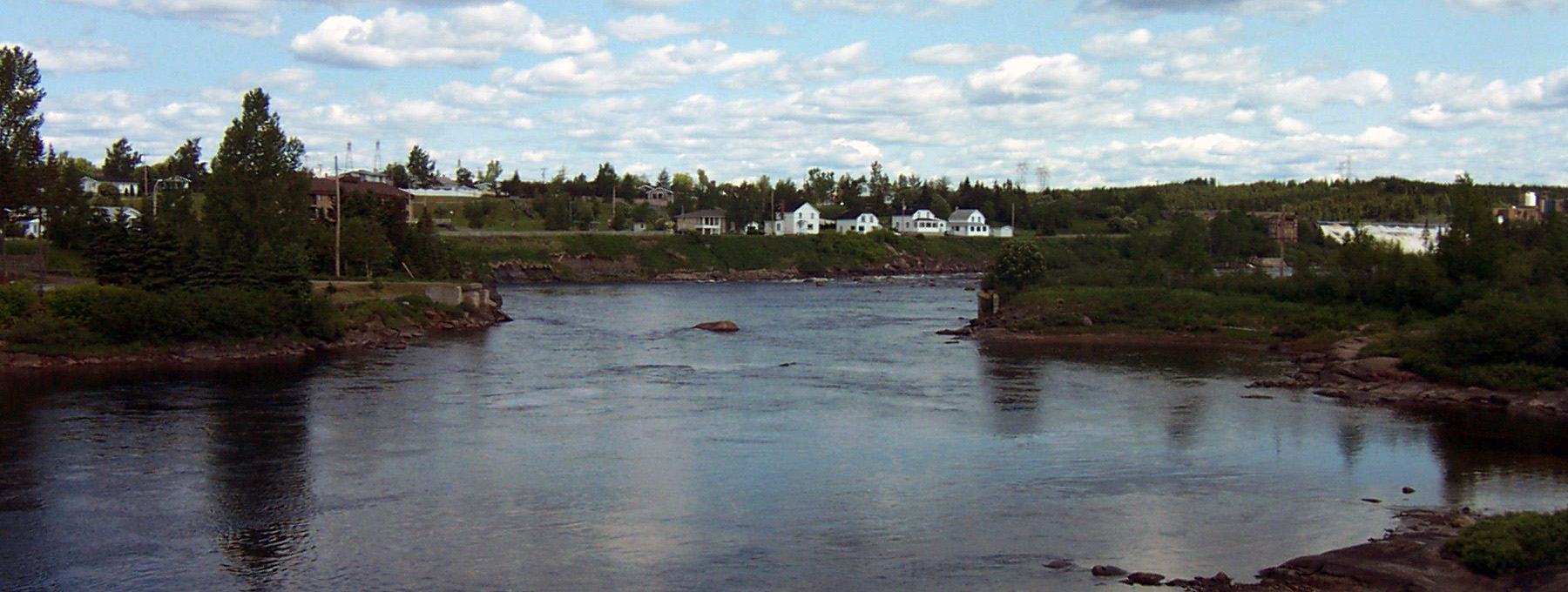
Aux Rochers River at Port-Cartier

The river is popular for fishing, containing various species including salmon. Large salmon are known to migrate through the river. On June 24, 2013, the Association de protection de la rivière Aux Rochers reported that, during counting of migrating fish through the counting facility, of the 20 fish counted, many were MSW (multi sea winter) salmon weighing over 25 pounds.

Aux Rochers River is also considered to be a scenic place and tourist destination as it has various areas of rapids and small falls.

== Conservation ==
There are two protected areas that cover 14.3% of the watershed combined. The Larry Lake Old Forest, between the Ronald and MacDonald Rivers, covers an area of 8.33 square kilometres (3.22 sq mi). It was created in 2005, and is an exceptional forest ecosystem of IUCN category III. The proposed Lake Pasteur Biodiversity Reserve was defined in 2003 and covers a total area of 635 square kilometres (245 sq mi), of which 590 square kilometres (230 sq mi) are in the catchment area. This is an IUCN III category area, and encompasses Pasteur Lake and almost all of Walker Lake. 90.3% of the watershed is contained in the Port-Cartier–Sept-Îles Wildlife Reserve.

In May 2015 the Ministry of Forests, Wildlife and Parks of Quebec announced a sport fishing catch-and-release program for large salmon on sixteen of Quebec's 118 salmon rivers. These were the Mitis, Laval, Pigou, Bouleau, Aux Rochers, Jupitagon, Magpie, Saint-Jean, Corneille, Piashti, Watshishou, Little Watshishou, Nabisipi, Aguanish and Natashquan rivers. The Quebec Atlantic Salmon Federation said that the measures did not go nearly far enough in protecting salmon for future generations. In view of the rapidly declining Atlantic salmon population catch-and-release should have been implemented on all rivers apart from northern Quebec.

== Citations ==
- Portrait du bassin versant aux Rochers (PDF) (in French), OBV Duplessis
- Portrait préliminaire de la zone de gestion intégrée de l'eau par bassin versant Duplessis (PDF) (in French), OBV Duplessis, April 2015
- Projet de parc national du Lac-Walker (PDF) (Map) (in French), Gouvernement du Québec, 2015
- Quebec salmon need stronger preservation rules, association says, Montreal: CBC News, 10 May 2015
- Rivière aux Rochers, Ressources naturelles Canada
- Saucier, J.-P.; Robitaille, A.; Grondin, P.; Bergeron, J.-F.; Gosselin, J. (2011), Les régions écologiques du Québec méridional (PDF) (map), 4 (in French), Ministère des Ressources naturelles et de la Faune, archived from the original (PDF) on 2020-06-19
- St-Pierre, Jean (7 May 2019), "De "petits pas" vers un parc national au lac Walker", Ma Côte Nord (in French), Arsenal Media
