= Lake Pasteur Biodiversity Reserve =

- Réserve de biodiversité du lac Pasteur
- IUCN category II (national park)
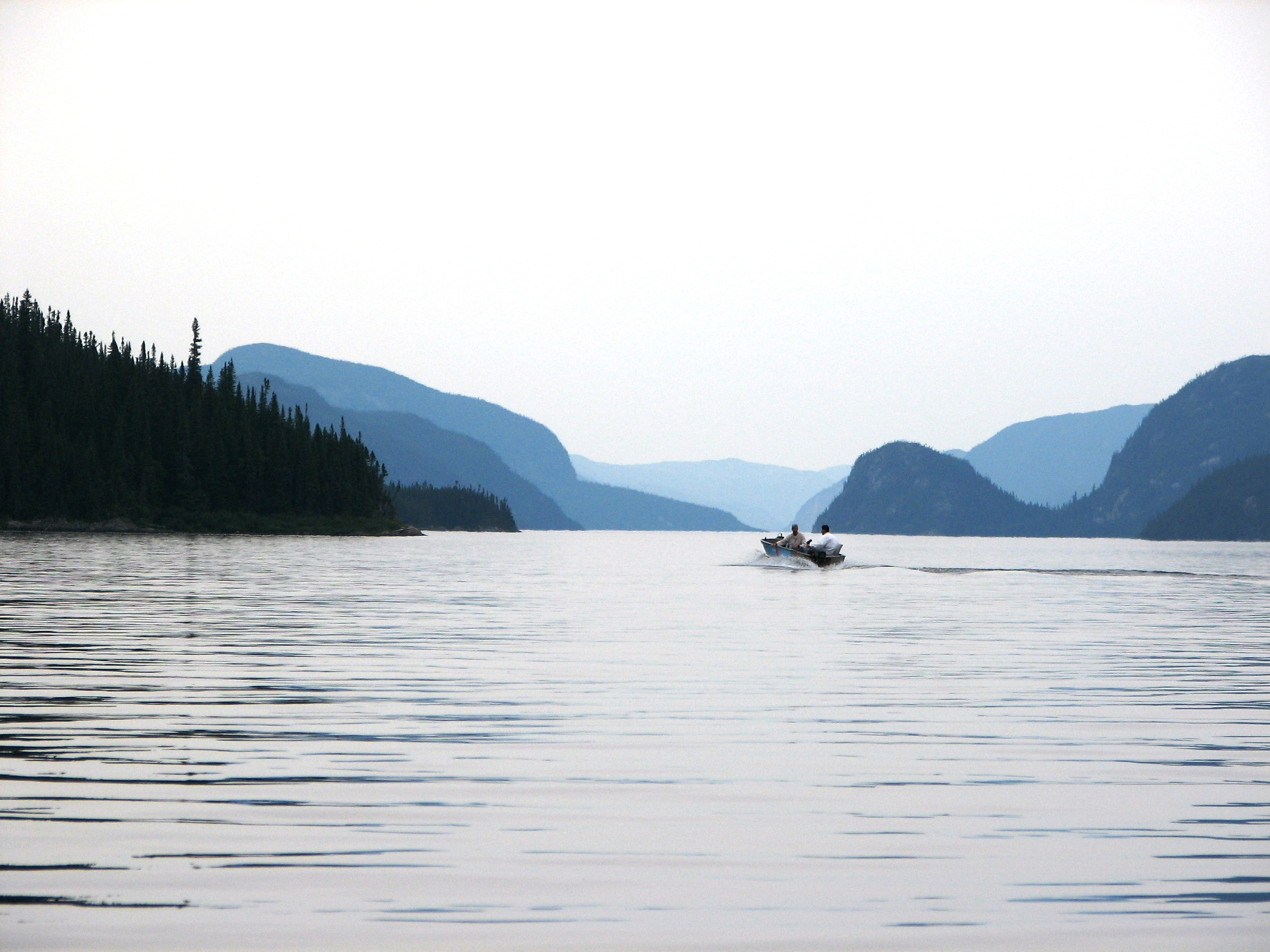
- Lake Walker

- Location within Quebec
- Location: Lac-Walker, Quebec, Canada
- Coordinates: 50.2°N 67°W
- Designation: biodiversity reserve (proposed)
- Administrator: Ministry of Sustainable Development, Environment, and Fight Against Climate Change

The Lake Pasteur Biodiversity Reserve (French: Réserve de biodiversité du lac Pasteur) is a proposed biodiversity reserve in the Côte-Nord region of Quebec, Canada.

== Background ==
The Lake Pasteur Biodiversity Reserve was designated a proposed reserve in 2003. The reserve would have IUCN management category II. The responsible authority is the Quebec Ministère du Développement durable, de l'Environnement et de la Lutte contre les changements climatiques.

The boundaries of proposed reserve were given in 2005, including Lake Pasteur but excluding Lake Walker. After public hearings, the September 2006 conservation plan showed the boundaries of the proposed biodiversity reserve expanded by 98.8 square kilometres (38.1 sq mi) to include Lake Walker and part of that lake's western shore. An area of Lake Walker and its western shore of 31.7 square kilometres (12.2 sq mi) was excluded due to mining titles.

== Location ==
The proposed Lake Pasteur biodiversity reserve is located in the Côte-Nord administrative region between latitude 50°08' and 50°27' north and longitude 66°50' and 67°15' west. It is about 15 kilometres (9.3 mi) north of the city of Port-Cartier. Including the expansion, it covers an area of 635.1 square kilometres (245.2 sq mi) in the unorganized territory of Lac-Walker within the Sept-Rivières Regional County Municipality. The reserve would contain Lac Morin in the southeast, Lake Pasteur, Lake Chevarie, and most of Lake Walker in the west. It would include part of the Pasteur River to the north of Lake Pasteur, but the northern boundary would exclude Lake Mouscoutchou and Lake Asquiche.

== Environment ==
The proposed biodiversity reserve is in the Sainte Marguerite Plateau, a natural region in the Central Laurentian natural province. The terrain is hilly, covered with glacial till. A map of the Ecological regions of Quebec shows the area of the reserve belonging to the eastern spruce/moss domain of the boreal zone. Vegetation includes moors, black spruce (Picea mariana) forests, some stands of balsam fir (Abies balsamea), and stands of paper birch (Betula papyrifera) and poplar (Populus tremuloides) in the northern part. There are scattered peat bogs. The proposed reserve has 9,316 hectares (23,020 acres) of peatland. The region is used by boreal woodland caribou, and the proposed reserve is in a caribou area of interest.

== Human land use ==
The proposed biodiversity reserve is within the Port-Cartier–Sept-Îles Wildlife Reserve. It is also in the Saguenay Beaver Reserve, where the Innu communities have special rights to hunt and trap fur animals. The privately owned Cartier Railway crosses the territory. Under the Natural Heritage Conservation Act prohibited activities would include mining and extraction of oil and gas, forestry and production of hydroelectricity and other forms of energy. Other prohibitions would include introducing native or exotic wildlife. Introduction of fish for commercial purposes, or of non-native flora would require a permit. Any changes affecting the natural drainage and flow of water, and water quality would also be prohibited. Various other restrictions would apply, all aimed at preserving the natural environment.

== Sources ==
- Plan de conservation, Réserve de biodiversité projetée du lac Pasteur (PDF) (in French), Quebec, September 2008
- Poulin, Monique; Rochefort, Line; Pellerin, Stéphanie; Thibault, Jacques (April 2004), "Threats and protection for peatlands in Eastern Canada" (PDF), Géocarrefour, 79
- Réserve de biodiversité projetée du lac Pasteur in Canada, Protected Planet
- Saucier, J.-P.; Robitaille, A.; Grondin, P.; Bergeron, J.-F.; Gosselin, J. (2011), Les régions écologiques du Québec méridional (PDF) (map), 4 (in French), Ministère des Ressources naturelles et de la Faune, archived from the original (PDF) on 2020-06-19
