= Sept Îles Archipelago Regional Park =

Proposed protected area in Quebec, Canada

- Parc régional de l'archipel des Sept Îles
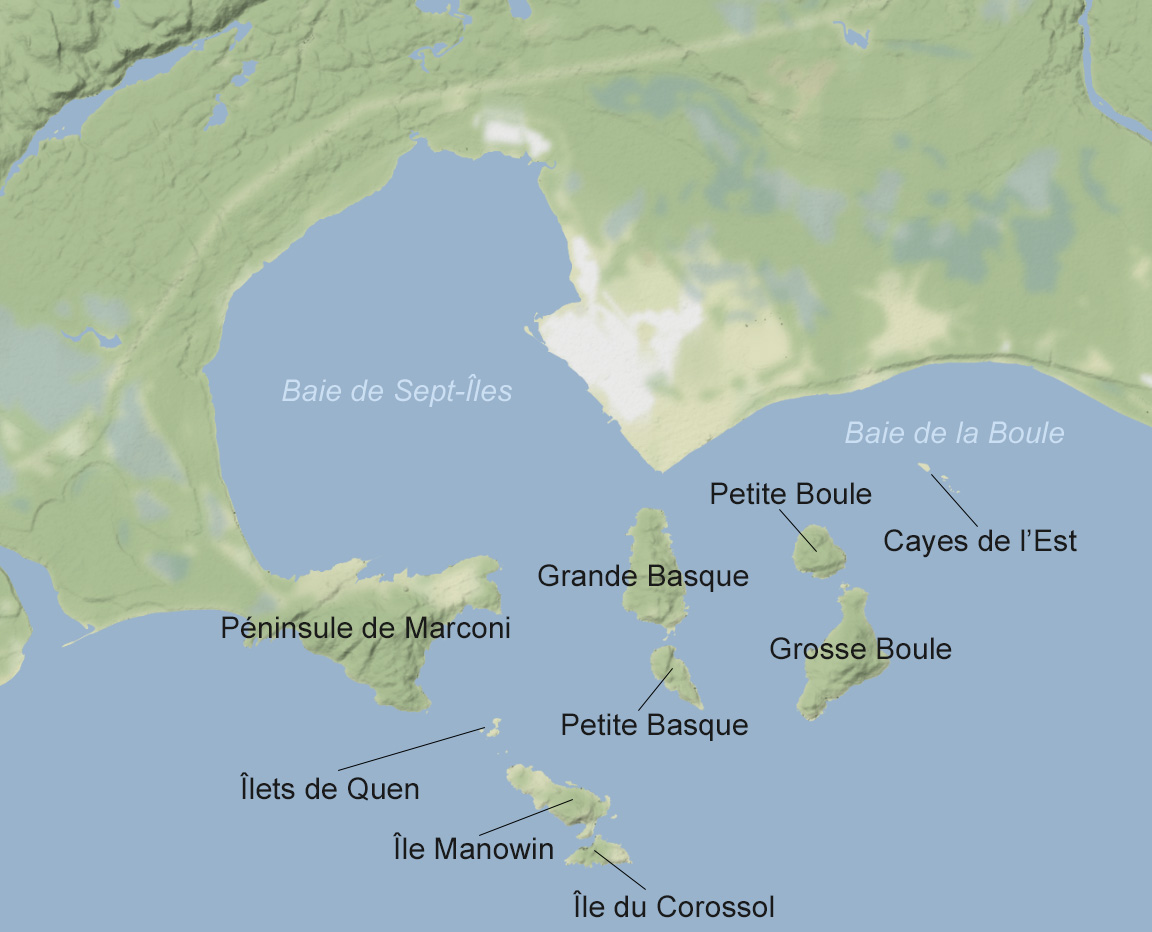
- Map of the archipelago

- Location within Quebec
- Location: Sept-Îles, Quebec, Canada
- Nearest city: Sept-Îles, Quebec
- Coordinates: 50.14°N 66.35°W
- Area: 13,000 ha (50 sq mi)
- Designation: Proposed

The Sept Îles Archipelago Regional Park (French: Parc régional de l'archipel des Sept Îles) is a proposed protected area in the Côte-Nord region of Quebec, Canada. The islands are important to migratory sea birds, and are also of interest to tourists. The management plan was prepared in 2008.

== Location ==
The Sept Îles Archipelago protects the mouth of the Sept Îles Bay on the north shore of the Gulf of Saint Lawrence about 250 kilometres (160 mi) east of Baie-Comeau and 250 kilometres (160 mi) west of Havre-Saint-Pierre. It is just north of the 50th parallel in Sept-Îles, in the Sept-Rivières Regional County Municipality of Quebec. The bay lies between the Marconi peninsula to the west and Pointe aux Basques to the east. The islands are Petite Boule, Grosse Boule, Grande Basque, Petite Basque, île du Corossol, île Manowin and the îlets De Quen.

The city of Sept-Îles, just north of the islands, has 73% of the population of Sept-Rivières, with 26,000 inhabitants in 2008. 10% of the people work directly in the mining, fishing and logging industries, and many of the other jobs are created by the role of the city as a supply and service center for the northern mining towns and the villages of the lower north shore. The Sept-Îles Tourism Corporation manages the recreational and tourist activities in the archipelago. The corporation manages the ferry to the Grande Basque island, and cruises around the islands.

== Environment ==
A map of the ecological regions of Quebec shows the archipelago as lying in ecological sub-region 5g-T Hautes collines de Baie-Comeau−Sept-Îles, within the eastern fir/white birch domain of the boreal zone.

The Sept Îles archipelago is part of the Sept-Îles IBA, an Important Bird Area. The IBA covers an area of 242 square kilometres (93 sq mi) including part of the City of Sept-Îles, the bay and its coastline, the archipelago and the Checkley plain. Corossol Island is designated a Migratory Bird Sanctuary and has a conservation plan. During the nesting season large numbers of seabirds invade the Île du Corossol, including the common eider. The main reason for making the island a refuge was to protect this species. Other common species include double-crested cormorant, great black-backed gull, herring gull, little penguin, black guillemot, Leach's storm petrel, black guillemot and black-legged kittiwake.

Species such as great black-backed gulls and herring gulls are in decline. An increase in recreational boating has disrupted the bird fauna in the archipelago, including causing the common eider to temporarily abandon their nestlings, which are then vulnerable to gulls. Starting in the fall of 2013 a project led the L'Institut nordique de recherche en environnement et en santé au travail (Inrest) began to gather data on the physicochemical quality of water and sediments of the bay and islands, and to analyze the results to identify potential impacts on ecosystem health. The Saint Lawrence Global Observatory (OGSL) and the Institute of Ocean Sciences (ISMER) of the Université du Québec à Rimouski participated.

== History ==
The Sept-Rivières Regional County Municipality (MRC) declared in October 2005 that it intended to create a regional park in the Sept-Îles archipelago. The project was the result of over 25 years of recreational and tourist development, creating pressure to establish a legal framework to protect this valuable natural asset. Factors were conservation of sensitive ecosystems and retaining visitors to the area.

A multidisciplinary working committee was set up in 2006 to work with the Regional County Municipality in creating guidelines for developing and managing the proposed regional park. The committee had eight members, consisting of a council member and technical representative of Port-Cartier and of Sept-Îles, and representatives of the Canadian Department of Fisheries and Oceans, the Quebec Department of Natural Resources and Wildlife, Tourisme Sept-Îles and the Côte-Nord Regional Environmental Council. The overall objective was to ensure sustainable development of the archipelago.

In February 2008 it was reported that the MRC had decided on the boundaries of the proposed park, which would cover 130 square kilometres (50 sq mi) of the archipelago, including a 1 kilometre (0.62 mi) boundary around the islands. Almost all the land was public property, so no expropriation would be involved. The Innu of Uashat-Maliotenam were to be consulted. The Grande-Basque Island, holding facilities of the IOC mining company, would be excluded from the park. The MRC recommended that the city of Sept-Îles should not accept any new commercial projects on the islands. The committee was to present its development and management plan to the Ministry of Municipal and Regional Affairs later that year.

== Sources ==
- Bourque, M.; Malouin, J. (January 2009), "Fiche #8. Baie des Sept Îles", Guide d'intervention en matière de conservation et de mise en valeur des habitats littoraux d'intérêt de la MRC de Sept-Rivières (PDF) (in French), Comité ZIP Côte-Nord du Golfe
- Comité du parc régional de l’archipel des Sept Îles (in French), MRC de Sept-Rivières
- Les limites du futur parc sont adoptées (in French), Société Radio-Canada, 28 February 2008
- MRC de Sept-Rivières (PDF) (map) (in French), Gouvernement du Québec, 23 August 2006
- Observatoire de veille environnementale de la baie de Sept-Iles - Phase I (PDF) (in French), Inrest, 2013
- Projet de parc régional de l'archipel des Sept Îles (in French), MRC de Sept-Rivières
- Saucier, J.-P.; Robitaille, A.; Grondin, P.; Bergeron, J.-F.; Gosselin, J. (2011), Les régions écologiques du Québec méridional (PDF) (map), 4 (in French), Ministère des Ressources naturelles et de la Faune, archived from the original (PDF) on 2020-06-19
