= Ronald River =

- Location within Quebec
- Native name: Rivière Ronald (French)

Location
- Country: Canada
- Province: Quebec
- Admin region: Côte-Nord
- Municipality: Sept-Rivières

Physical characteristics
- Source
  - location: Lac Fraser
  - coordinates: 50.272993°N 67.226270°W
- Mouth
  - location: MacDonald River
  - coordinates: 50.17288°N 67.26093°W
- Length: 21 kilometres (13 mi)
- Basin size: 128 square kilometres (49 sq mi)

Basin features
- River system: Aux Rochers River

The Ronald River (French: Rivière Ronald) is a river in the Côte-Nord region of Quebec, Canada. It is a left tributary of the MacDonald River.

== Location ==
The Ronald River is the Sept-Rivières Regional County Municipality, Côte-Nord, Québec, Canada. It is in a region with Köppen climate classification Dfc (Subarctic climate). It is a tributary of the Rivière MacDonald, which in turn is a tributary of the Rivière aux Rochers. The river is used by salmon. It will be completely contained within the proposed Lake Walker National Park.

The river basin covers 128 square kilometres (49 sq mi). The valley is 21 kilometres (13 mi) long and is fed from lakes such as Desrosiers, Gaudreault, Rosaire and Fraser. Lac Fraser is oriented with the axis of the river valley at its head. The average elevation of the upper section is 256 metres (840 ft). It may be accessed by a 2.5 kilometres (1.6 mi) trail for off-road vehicles.

As of 2013 fishing for atlantic salmon was prohibited year round. Fishing for other species was restricted to fly fishing, and was allowed from mid-May to early September.

== Course ==
The upper part of the river has a series of short flat stretches alternating with sloping sections. The upper section of the river runs through a narrow valley in a NNE-SSW direction, cutting through a hilly plateau. The river follows many fractures in the bedrock and structural depressions, and also has winding or rectilinear thalwegs. Lower down after crossing a rocky threshold the valley broadens into a trough-shaped glacial valley, still oriented NNE-SSW due to the structure of this part of the Laurentian shield. The river becomes more regular, and meanders through glacial materials that it has modified and redistributed over the valley floor. The flanks of the valley are steep, particularly on the east side.

== Geology ==
The Ronald River Valley and the hills to the east have a few gneiss enclaves, which differ from gneisses found elsewhere in the park in having pyroxenes associated with amphibole and biotite, forming minute rust spots. Thick deposits identified as sections of moraine have been identified along the Ronald River. There fluvio-glacial deposits would have been torn off and transported by the glacier, then deposited in separate layers by meltwater. There are scattered accumulations of glacial deposits from dead-ice moraines along hanging valleys such as North Manikis Creek, east of the Ronald River Valley.

== Sources ==
- Bellavance, Denis (2018). "Projet de parc national du Lac-Walker, Descriptions géologiques, géomorphologiques et sites d'intérêt" (PDF). Équipe écologie et territoire, Direction de l’expertise en biodiversité, Ministère du Développement durable, de l’Environnement et de la Lutte contre les changements climatiques (FTP) (in French). (To view documents see Help:FTP)
- Fishing period Zone 19 South, MRNF
- "List of Salmon Rivers" (PDF), Canada Gazette, 142 (26), 24 December 2008
- "Rivière Ronald, Québec, Canada", Mindat.org
