= Riegel (glacial) =

Ridge of bedrock exposed by glacial erosion

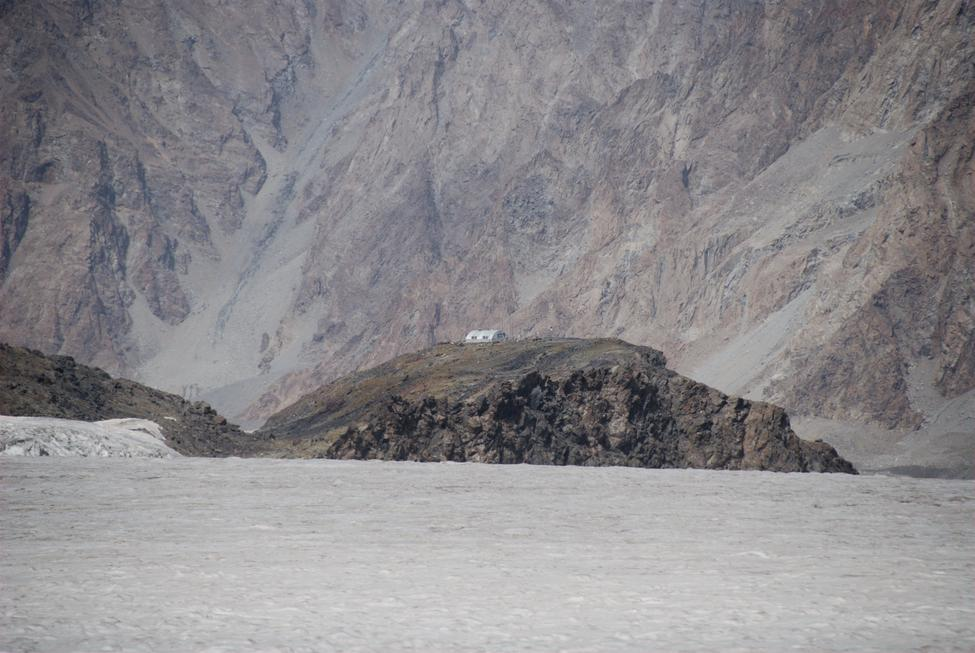
Riegel of the Fedchenko Glacier

A riegel (from German, literally crossbar) is a transverse ridge of bedrock that has been exposed by glacial erosion. Riegels are also known as rock bars, thresholds, and verrous. They are found in glaciated valleys, and are often associated with waterfalls and zones of rapids when streams are present. When multiple riegels are stacked in a series they are referred to as a glacial stairway.

Most riegels can be identified by having smooth faces on the up-valley sides, while the down-valley sides show signs of having been plucked (eroded by the removal of rocks and blocks from the bedrock).
