= Shelter Bay, Quebec =

Bay in Quebec, Canada

Coordinates: 50.017°N 66.867°W

Shelter Bay (French: Baie de l'abri) was named by Col. Robert R. McCormick in 1919 as the name of the Quebec North Shore Paper Company's port, since the name previously used for that location was Rivière-aux-Rochers (Rocky River), and vessels would be reluctant to call. It is located on the north shore of the Gulf of Saint Lawrence in Sept-Rivières Regional County Municipality in Quebec's Côte-Nord region. The area, the people, and the founding of the paper-making enterprise are described in the book Shelter Bay by Harvey Hassall Smith, a close friend and former classmate of Arthur A. Schmon.
