= Lake Walker =

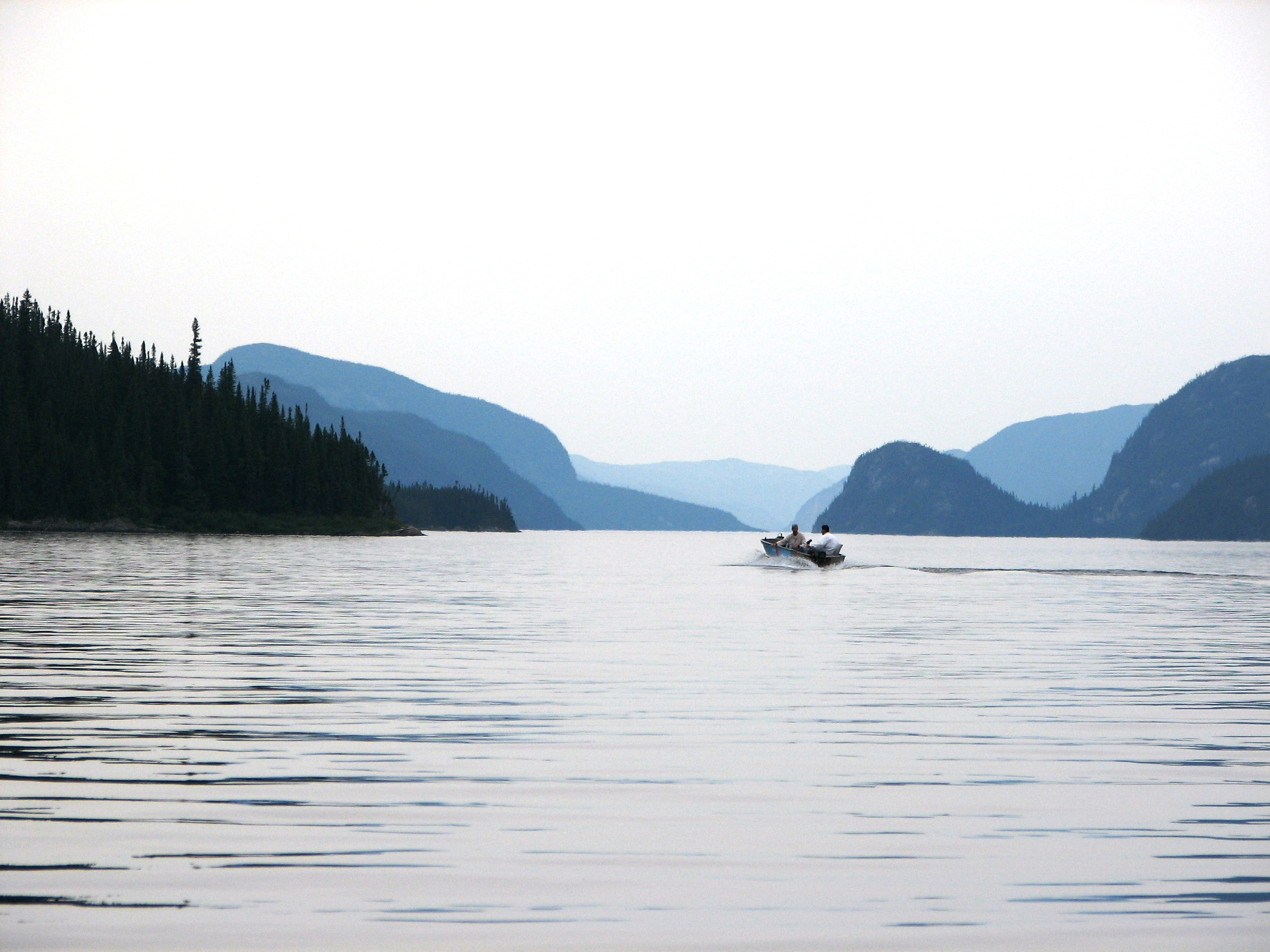

- Location within Quebec
- Location: Quebec
- Coordinates: 50°18′N 67°09′W
- Type: fjord lake
- Catchment area: 2,187 km^{2} (844 sq mi)
- Max. length: 33 km (21 mi)
- Surface area: 41 km^{2} (16 sq mi)
- Max. depth: 271 m (889 ft)
- Surface elevation: 115 m (377 ft)
- Settlements: Lac-Walker

Lake Walker is a lake in Quebec, Canada. It is located in the Sept-Rivières Regional County Municipality in the region of Côte-Nord, about 30 km northwest of Port-Cartier.

== Location ==
Lake Walker is within the Port-Cartier–Sept-Îles Wildlife Reserve. Since 2006 it has been proposed to establish the Lake Walker National Park within the wildlife sanctuary, surrounding Lake Walker. As of May 2019 the project was stalled for lack of funding. It is named for Hovenden Walker, and gives its name to the Lac-Walker unorganized territory.

== Environment ==
A map of the Ecological regions of Quebec places the lake in the 6J-T ecological subregion, part of the eastern spruce/moss domain of the boreal zone.

== Hydrology ==
The main tributary of Lake Walker is the Schmon River, which enters at the northern end. Like many of the lakes in the region, Lake Walker is highly elongated, being 33 km long and no more than 4 km wide, and has steep rocky sides. A 2019 survey established its depth at 271 metres, making it the deepest lake in Quebec, ahead of the Pingualuit crater in Nunavik (252 m).

The southern tip of the lake flows into the Aux Rochers River which carries its water to the Saint-Lawrence River about 30 km to the southeast.

== Sources ==
- Bellavance, Denis (2018). "Projet de parc national du Lac-Walker, Descriptions géologiques, géomorphologiques et sites d'intérêt" (PDF). Équipe écologie et territoire, Direction de l’expertise en biodiversité, Ministère du Développement durable, de l’Environnement et de la Lutte contre les changements climatiques (FTP) (in French). (To view documents see Help:FTP)
- Saucier, J.-P.; Robitaille, A.; Grondin, P.; Bergeron, J.-F.; Gosselin, J. (2011), Les régions écologiques du Québec méridional (PDF) (map), 4 (in French), Ministère des Ressources naturelles et de la Faune, archived from the original (PDF) on 2020-06-19
- St-Pierre, Jean (7 May 2019), "De "petits pas" vers un parc national au lac Walker", Ma Côte Nord (in French), Arsenal Media
