= Schmon River =

- Location within Quebec
- Native name: Rivière Schmon (French)

Location
- Country: Canada
- Province: Quebec
- Region: Côte-Nord

Physical characteristics
- Mouth
  - location: Lake Walker
  - coordinates: 50.42222°N 67.19222°W
  - elevation: 117 metres (384 ft)
- Length: 90 kilometres (56 mi)
- Basin size: 928.2 square kilometres (358.4 sq mi)

The Schmon River (French: Rivière Schmon) is a river in the Côte-Nord region of the province of Quebec, Canada. It flows south into Lake Walker.

== Location ==
The Schmon River has its source in Lac au Vent and Lac aux Mouches. It flows south for almost 90 kilometres (56 mi) to Lake Walker. Its mouth is at an elevation of 117 metres (384 ft). For most of its length it flows through the Port-Cartier–Sept-Îles Wildlife Reserve. The lower section meanders through the proposed Lake Walker National Park. The Schmon river flows through land that is mostly covered in coniferous forests.

== Name ==
The river was called Rivière aux Rochers Nord-Ouest until 1975, when it was renamed in honor of Arthur A. Schmon (1895–1964) of Newark, New Jersey, a leading figure in the paper industry. The river flows through Lake Schmon close to its source.

== Route ==
The Schmon River is one of the main tributaries of Lake Walker. Its watershed covers 928.2 square kilometres (358.4 sq mi), and rises over 79 kilometres (49 mi) upstream from the lake. Originally the valley was V-shaped, but the glacial tongues that occupied it several times during the Quaternary transformed it into a well-defined trough. Along its length the Schmon river valley shows a series of glacial barriers and accumulation basins. For example, the valley broadens out to the south of the Saint-Joseph Creek to more than double its width lower down.

In the last 20 kilometres (12 mi) of its length the river has several areas of past of present meanders. The glacial meltwater transported and deposited glaciofluvial sediments in this valley. These sediments were taken up, eroded and then transported downstream by deltaic and fluvial processes. The land on either side of the river has high terraces above the river, below which are progressively lower alluvial terraces.

== Environment ==
The region is in the Köppen climate classification's boreal climate zone. A map of the Ecological regions of Quebec shows the river rising and flowing south through the eastern spruce/moss domain of the boreal zone. The average annual temperature is −1 °C (30 °F). The warmest month is July, with the average temperature of 14 °C (57 °F), and the coldest is February with an average of −16 °C (3 °F).

== Sources ==
- Bellavance, Denis (2018). "Projet de parc national du Lac-Walker, Descriptions géologiques, géomorphologiques et sites d'intérêt" (PDF). Équipe écologie et territoire, Direction de l’expertise en biodiversité, Ministère du Développement durable, de l’Environnement et de la Lutte contre les changements climatiques (FTP) (in French). (To view documents see Help:FTP)
- Lac Schmon (map) (in French), Commission de toponymie du Québec
- NASA Earth Observations Data Set Index, NASA, archived from the original on 11 May 2020
- NASA Earth Observations: Land Cover Classification, NASA/MODIS, archived from the original on 28 February 2016
- Peel, M.C.; Finlayson, B.L.; McMahon, T.A. (2007), Updated world map of the Köppen-Geiger climate classification, Hydrology and Earth System Sciences, vol. 11, doi:10.5194/hess-11-1633-2007
- Projet de parc national du Lac-Walker (PDF) (Map) (in French), Gouvernement du Québec, 2015, archived from the original (PDF) on 2018-12-28
- Rivière Schmon (in French), Commission de toponymie du Québec
- "Rivière Schmon", Mapcarta
- Saucier, J.-P.; Robitaille, A.; Grondin, P.; Bergeron, J.-F.; Gosselin, J. (2011), Les régions écologiques du Québec méridional (PDF) (map), 4 (in French), Ministère des Ressources naturelles et de la Faune, archived from the original (PDF) on 2020-06-19
