= Port-Cartier–Sept-Îles Wildlife Reserve =

Wildlife reserve in Quebec, Canada

Port-Cartier-Sept-Îles Wildlife Reserve
- Réserve faunique de Port-Cartier - Sept-Îles
- IUCN category VI (protected area with sustainable use of natural resources)
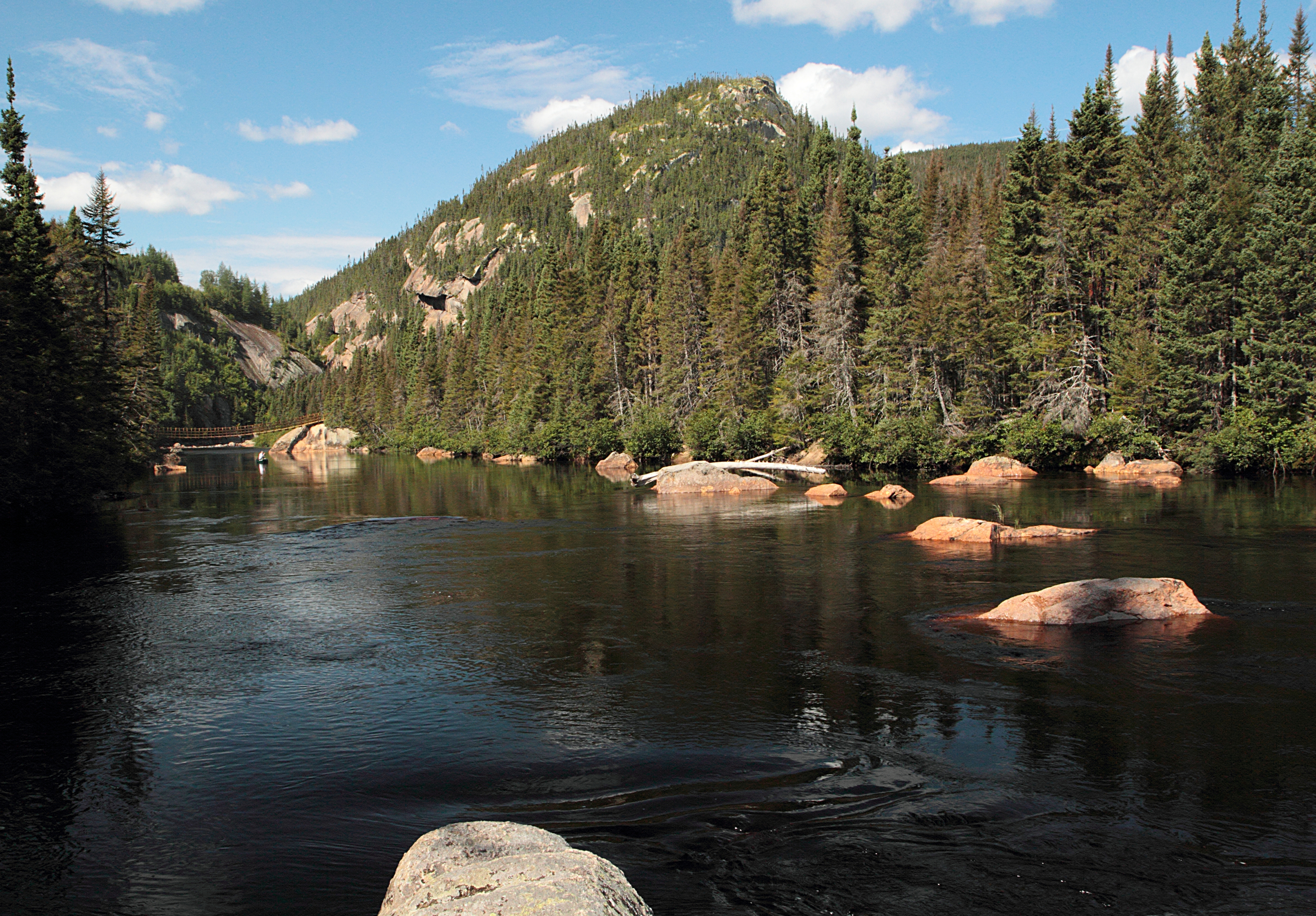
- MacDonald River

- Location within Quebec
- Location: Quebec, Canada
- Nearest city: Sept-Rivières Regional County Municipality
- Coordinates: 50.289659°N 67.160911°W
- Area: 1,479 km^{2} (571 sq mi)
- Created: 1965

The Port-Cartier-Sept-Îles Wildlife Reserve (French: Réserve faunique de Port-Cartier - Sept-Îles, pronounced [ʁezɛʁv fonik də pɔʁ kaʁtje sɛt il]) is a wildlife reserve in the province of Quebec, Canada.

== Conservation ==
The reserve was created in 1965, covering 6,423 square kilometres (2,480 sq mi) of boreal forest near the towns of Port-Cartier and Sept-Îles. The wildlife reserve was approved by an order of the Minister for Wildlife and Parks dated 16 July 1999, to take effect on 26 August 1999. The Lake Walker National Park, a proposed national park, is in the center of the wildlife reserve. It would cover an area of 1,479 square kilometres (571 sq mi) in the Côte-Nord administrative region.

== Environment ==
There are about 1,000 lakes, of which 100 can be accessed, 15 rivers and many streams. Fish include Speckled trout, Arctic char, Lake smelt, Whitefish and Atlantic salmon. The forest contains conifers such as Picea mariana (black spruce), Picea glauca (white spruce), Abies balsamea (balsam fir) and Larix laricina (tamarack), and deciduous trees such as birch and Populus tremuloides (trembling aspen). The reserve contains the Larry Lake Old Growth Forest, located between the Ronald and MacDonald Rivers. It covers an area of 8.33 square kilometres (3.22 sq mi).

Wildlife includes moose, black bear, boreal woodland caribou, wolf, lynx, fox, snowshoe hare, porcupine, beaver, mink, otter and marten. Birdlife includes resident ruffed grouse and spruce grouse, and migratory birds in the spring and autumn.

== Visitors ==
The reserve is open to visitors, who may fish, hunt, pick berries, or explore the area on foot or by boat. Campsites and cabins are available for overnight visitors. There are more than 100 lakes, most of which have never been fished, and 15 rivers. There are native speckled trout (Salvelinus fontinalis) in most lakes.

== Attractions ==
MacDonald Falls on the MacDonald River and footbridge is one of the attractions, as are the Carlos Falls and the De la Montagne and MacDonald hiking trails. Lake Walker, 33 kilometres (21 mi) long, is about 20 kilometres (12 mi) from Port-Cartier. It has steep cliffs that may be climbed and is a good place for boating. It is named after Admiral Hovenden Walker (1656–1725 or 1728), who tried but failed to seize New France for Britain in 1711. Lake Arthur is about 100 kilometres (62 mi) northwest of Port-Cartier, and is named after Arthur A. Schmon (1895–1964) of Newark, New Jersey, a leading figure in the paper industry.

== Sources ==
- "M.O., 99022" (PDF), Gazette Officielle du Québec, 131 (32), 11 August 1999
- "5. Portrait du bassin versant aux Rochers" (PDF), Bassins versants (in French), Organisme de bassins versants Duplessis
- Projet de parc national du Lac Walker (in French), Gouvernement du Québec, 2018
- Réserve faunique de Port‑Cartier–Sept‑Îles, Home (in French), Sépaq
- Réserve faunique de Port‑Cartier–Sept‑Îles, Portrait, Sépaq
