= Port-Cartier =

- City
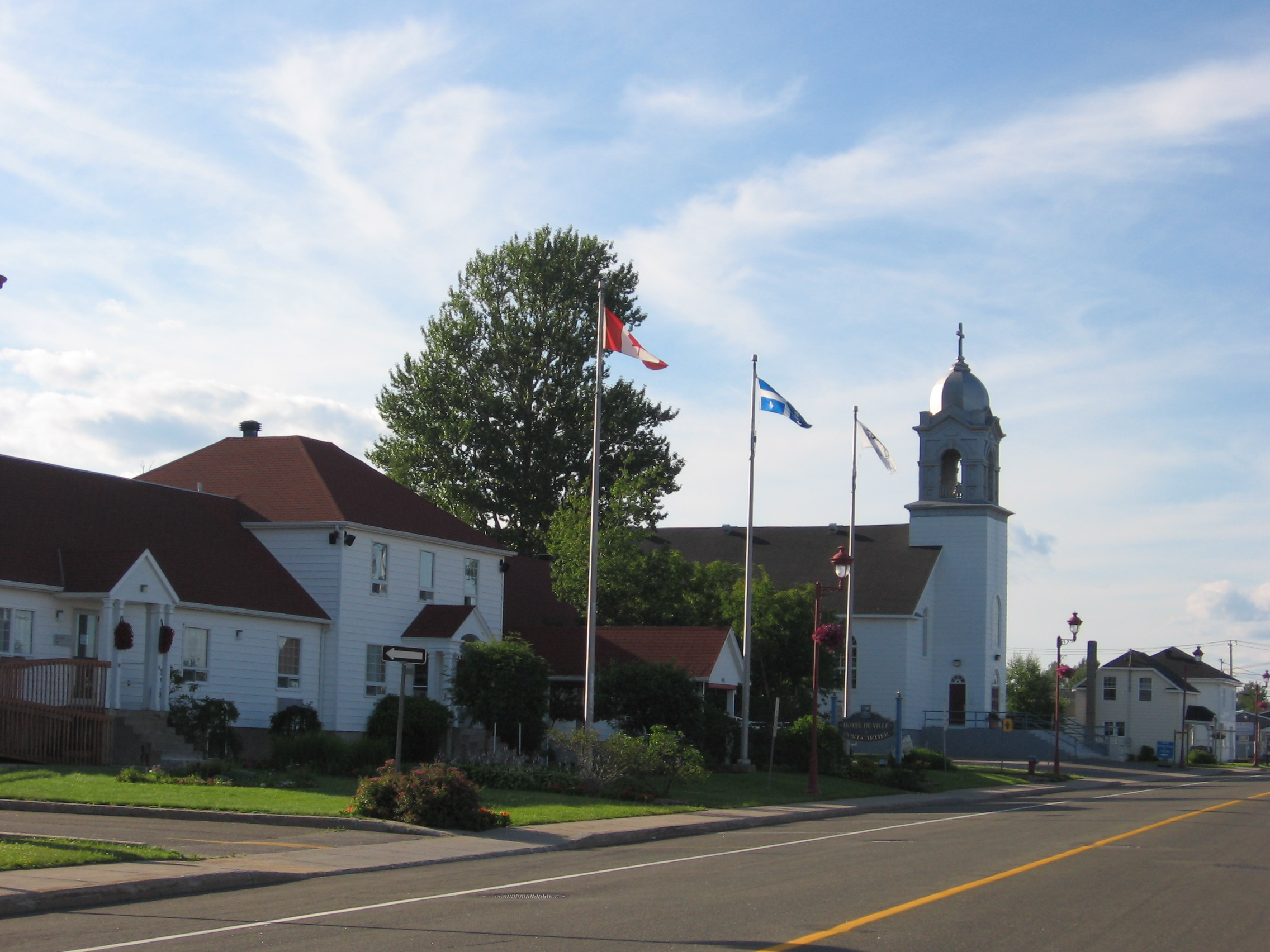

- Coat of arms

- Location within Quebec
- Coordinates: 50°02′N 66°52′W
- Country: Canada
- Province: Quebec
- Region: Côte-Nord
- RCM: Sept-Rivières
- Settled: 1916
- Constituted: February 19, 2003

Government
  - Mayor: Danielle Beaupré
  - Federal riding: Côte-Nord—Kawawachikamach—Nitassinan
  - Prov. riding: Duplessis

Area
  - Total: 1,371.79 km^{2} (529.65 sq mi)
  - Land: 1,092.75 km^{2} (421.91 sq mi)

Population (2021)
  - Total: 6,516
  - Density: 6/km^{2} (16/sq mi)
  - Pop (2016-21): ▼4.2%
  - Dwellings: 3,307
- Time zone: UTC−05:00 (EST)
  - Summer (DST): UTC−04:00 (EDT)
- Postal code(s): G5B
- Area codes: 418 and 581
- Highways: R-138
- Website: www.villeport-cartier.com

Port-Cartier (French pronunciation: [pɔʁ kaʁtje]) is a city in the Côte-Nord region of Quebec, Canada. It is located on the north shore of the St. Lawrence River at the mouth of the Aux-Rochers River, 63 kilometres (39 mi) southwest of Sept-Îles, Quebec.

Port-Cartier had a population of 6,516 at the 2021 Canadian census. It has a land area of 1,092 square kilometres (422 sq mi), ranking 27th in area among all Canadian cities and towns. Besides Port-Cartier itself, the communities of Rivière-Pentecôte (49°47′N 67°10′W), Pointe-aux-Anglais (49°40′38″N 67°10′05″W), Baie-des-Homards (49°49′58″N 67°06′41″W), and Grand-Ruisseau (49°44′03″N 67°10′26″W) are also within its municipal boundaries, all located along Quebec Route 138.

== History ==
In 1915, Colonel Robert R. McCormick, owner of the Chicago Tribune, visited the Rochers River area to evaluate its forest potential. Soon after, a settlement was established on the west side of the mouth of this river, originally called Shelter Bay. The post office opened in 1916, followed by a sawmill in 1918 and a debarking factory of the Ontario Paper Company in 1920. Yet the exhaustion of timber led to the closure of the factory in 1955.

In 1958, the Québec Cartier Mining Company constructed an iron ore processing plant and an artificial sea port near Shelter Bay, for shipping the iron ore mined from deposits at Lake Jeannine near Gagnon. Port-Cartier, named after the mining company, was incorporated as a town in 1959 and the next year, Shelter Bay was added to it. The original town of Shelter Bay is now the suburb known as Port-Cartier West. Today, the port handles approximately 18,000,000 tonnes (19,800,000 short tons; 17,700,000 long tons) of cargo per year and ranks third in Quebec in terms of handled tonnage.

=== Rivière-Pentecôte ===
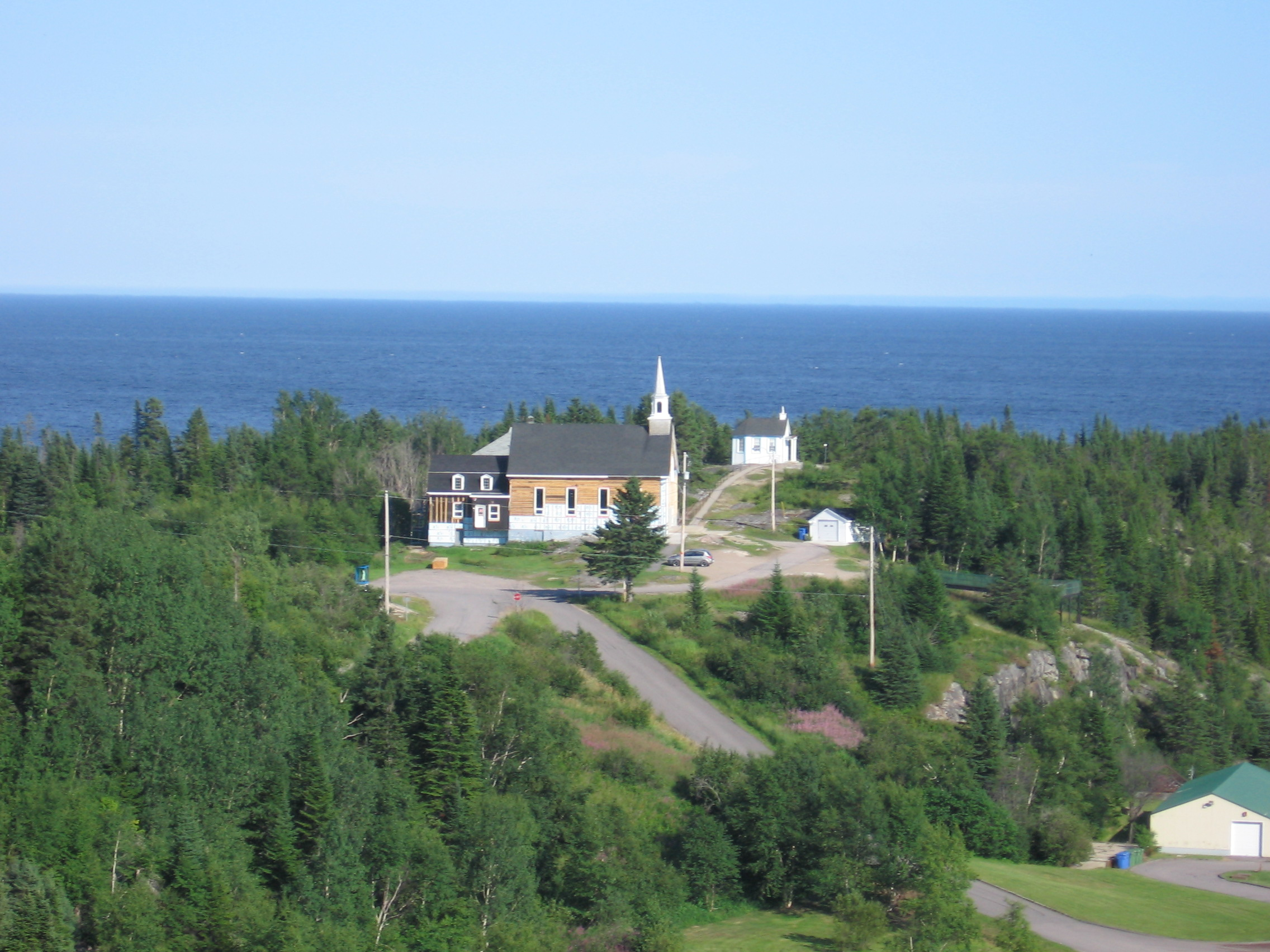
Rivière-Pentecôte

In 1875, a mission called Saint-Patrice-de-la-Rivière-Pentecôte was established some 100 km south-west of Sept-Îles at the mouth of the Pentecôte River. This name is attributed to Jacques Cartier who arrived at the place on the day of Pentecost in 1535. In 1884, the "Penticost River" Post Office opened, frenchized to Rivière-Pentecôte in 1933. At the end of the 19th century, it was among the most important industrial centres along the North Shore. In 1972, the Municipality of Rivière-Pentecôte was formed out of unorganized territory.

On February 19, 2003, the Municipality of Rivière-Pentecôte was amalgamated into the city of Port-Cartier.

== Demographics ==
In the 2021 Census of Population conducted by Statistics Canada, Port-Cartier had a population of 6,516 living in 2,918 of its 3,307 total private dwellings, a change of −4.2% from its 2016 population of 6,799. With a land area of 1,092.75 km^{2} (421.91 sq mi), it had a population density of 6.0/km^{2} (15.4/sq mi) in 2021.

Canada census – Port-Cartier community profile

	2021	2016	2011
Population	6,516 (-4.2% from 2016)	6,799 (+2.2% from 2011)	6,651 (-1.6% from 2006)
Land area	1,092.75 km^{2} (421.91 sq mi)	1,102.09 km^{2} (425.52 sq mi)	1,101.31 km^{2} (425.22 sq mi)
Population density	6.0/km^{2} (16/sq mi)	6.2/km^{2} (16/sq mi)	6.0/km^{2} (16/sq mi)
Median age	45.2 (M: 44.4, F: 46.4)	43.7 (M: 43.0, F: 44.6)	43.1 (M: 42.6, F: 43.5)
Private dwellings	3,307 (total) 2,918 (occupied)	3,336 (total) 2,930 (occupied)	3,093 (total)
Median household income	$82,000	$74,816	$70,897

Notes: Municipality of Rivière-Pentecôte amalgamated into the Town of Port-Cartier on February 19, 2003.
References: 2021 2016 2011

Historical Census Data - Port-Cartier, Quebec

Year	Pop.	±%
1961	3,458	—
1966	3,537	+2.3%
1971	3,730	+5.5%
1976	8,139	+118.2%
1981	8,191	+0.6%
1986	6,858	−16.3%
1991	7,383	+7.7%

Year	Pop.	±%
1996	7,070	−4.2%
2001	6,412	−9.3%
2006	6,758	+5.4%
2011	6,651	−1.6%
2016	6,799	+2.2%
2021	6,516	−4.2%

Population counts are not adjusted for boundary changes and mergers.
Source: Statistics Canada

Historical census populations – Rivière-Pentecôte
Year	Pop.	±%
1976	953	—
1981	924	−3.0%
1986	786	−14.9%
1991	736	−6.4%
1996	622	−15.5%
2001	640	+2.9%
The Municipality of Rivière-Pentecôte existed from 1972 to 2003. Source: Statistics Canada

Mother tongue (2021):

- English as first language: 1.3%
- French as first language: 97.1%
- English and French as first language: 0.6%
- Other as first language: 1.0%

== Jail ==
The Correctional Service of Canada operates the Port-Cartier Institution, a maximum security prison, about two kilometres to the north. The institution houses male offenders and offers various programs and services to promote rehabilitation and reintegration into society. Port-Cartier Institution is known for its focus on education and vocational training, with a wide range of courses available to help inmates develop new skills and prepare for successful reentry into the workforce upon release. Notable inmates have included convicted murderers Paul Bernardo, Russell Williams, Michael Rafferty, Mohammed Shafia, Robert Pickton, Luka Magnotta, and Guy Turcotte.

== Local government ==
List of former mayors:

- Roger Labrie (1959–1964)
- Hector Maloney (1964–1966)
- Louis Dufresne (1966–1973)
- Gervais Lechasseur (1973–1975)
- Bernard Dionne (1975–1982)
- Ghislain Gagnon (1982–1983)
- Anthony Detroio (1983–2009)
- Laurence Méthot (2009–2013)
- Violaine Doyle (2013–2017)
- Alain Thibault (2017–2025)
- Danielle Beaupré (2025–present)

== See also ==
- List of cities in Quebec
- Cartier Railway
- Île aux Oeufs
- Port-Cartier–Sept-Îles Wildlife Reserve
