= Lac-Walker =

- Unorganized territory
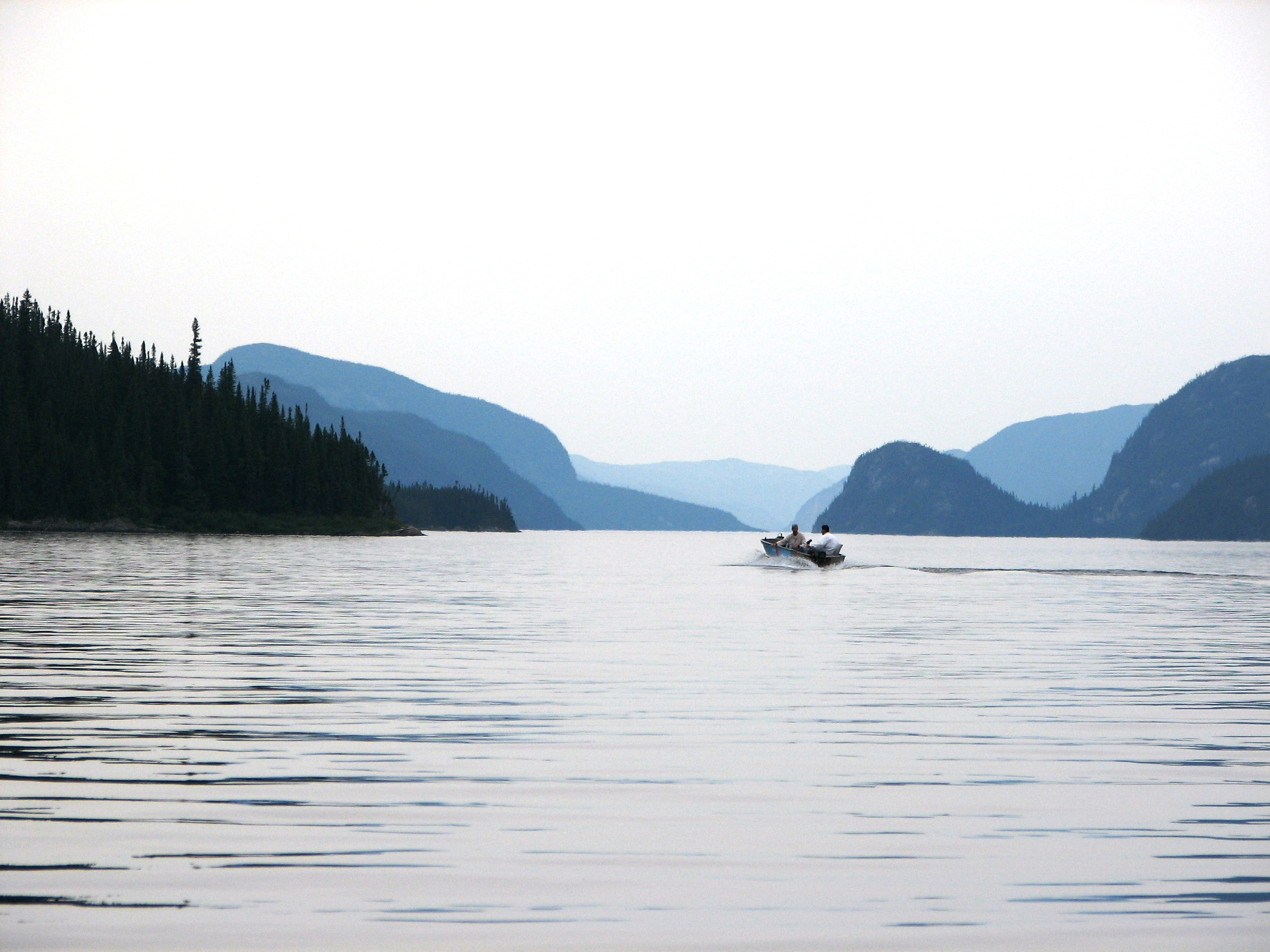
- Lake Walker

- Location in Côte-Nord region of Quebec
- Coordinates: 50°16′N 67°09′W
- Country: Canada
- Province: Quebec
- Region: Côte-Nord
- RCM: Sept-Rivières
- Constituted: January 1, 1986

Government
  - Federal riding: Côte-Nord—Kawawachikamach—Nitassinan
  - Prov. riding: Duplessis

Area
  - Total: 18,881.62 km^{2} (7,290.23 sq mi)
  - Land: 17,162.43 km^{2} (6,626.45 sq mi)

Population (2021)
  - Total: 113
  - Density: 0/km^{2} (0/sq mi)
  - Pop (2016-21): ▲4.6%
  - Dwellings: 59
- Time zone: UTC−5 (EST)
  - Summer (DST): UTC−4 (EDT)
- Area codes: 418 and 581
- Highways: No major routes

Lac-Walker is an unorganized territory in the Côte-Nord region of Quebec, Canada. It makes up more than half of the Sept-Rivières Regional County Municipality.

The eponymous Lake Walker, named after Hovenden Walker, is about 33 kilometres (21 mi) long and has steep rock walls. It is located in the Port-Cartier-Sept-Îles Wildlife Reserve, that offers many outdoor recreation activities.

== Demographics ==
Historical census populations – Lac-Walker, Quebec

Year	Pop.	±%
1986	86	—
1991	88	+2.3%
1996	128	+45.5%
2001	104	−18.8%

Year	Pop.	±%
2006	128	+23.1%
2011	102	−20.3%
2016	108	+5.9%
2021	113	+4.6%

Source: Statistics Canada

Private dwellings occupied by usual residents (2021): 50 (total dwellings: 59)

== See also ==
- List of unorganized territories in Quebec
