= Sept-Rivières Regional County Municipality =

Sept-Rivières
- Regional county municipality
- Coordinates: 50°08′N 66°37′W
- Country: Canada
- Province: Quebec
- Region: Côte-Nord
- Effective: March 18, 1981
- County seat: Sept-Îles

Government
  - Type: Prefecture
  - Prefect: Denis Miousse

Area
  - Total: 33,007.88 km^{2} (12,744.41 sq mi)
  - Land: 29,527.90 km^{2} (11,400.79 sq mi)
- Includes native reserves

Population (2021)
  - Total: 34,358
  - Density: 1.2/km^{2} (3.1/sq mi)
  - Pop (2016-21): ▲3.1%
  - Dwellings: 17,244
- Includes native reserves
- Time zone: UTC−5 (EST)
  - Summer (DST): UTC−4 (EDT)
- Area codes: 418 and 581
- Website: www.mrc.septrivieres.qc.ca

Sept-Rivières (French pronunciation: [sɛt ʁivjɛʁ], "Seven-Rivers") is a regional county municipality of Quebec, Canada, in the Côte-Nord region. Its county seat is Sept-Îles.

The census groups Sept-Rivières RCM with neighbouring Caniapiscau Regional County Municipality into the single census division of Sept-Rivières—Caniapiscau. In the 2021 Canadian census, the combined population was 38,240. The population of Sept-Rivières RCM itself was 34,358, of whom the vast majority live in the city of Sept-Îles.

== Geography ==
Sept-Rivières is located in the central part of Côte-Nord. It is bordered by the regional county municipalities of Manicouagan, Caniapiscau, and Minganie, as well as by the southwest corner of Labrador and by the Gulf of Saint Lawrence. It is mostly covered by the Laurentian Mountains. It is a very sparsely populated and undeveloped region with its population highly concentrated along the coast, mostly at Sept-Îles (about three-fourths of the population).

It allegedly takes its name from seven major rivers that join the Saint Lawrence within the territory: Moisie, Sainte-Marguerite, Trinité, Pentecôte, aux Rochers, Pigou and Manitou. But neither the Trinité River nor the Manitou River reaches the Saint Lawrence within the limits of the regional county municipality, and many other rivers could be amongst those "seven rivers".

== Subdivisions ==
There are four subdivisions and two native reserves within the RCM:

Cities & Towns (2)

- Port-Cartier
- Sept-Îles

Unorganized territories (2)

- Lac-Walker
- Rivière-Nipissis

Native Reserves (2)
(not associated with RCM)

- Maliotenam
- Uashat

== Demographics ==
Canada census – Sept-Rivières RCM community profile

	2021
Population	34,358 (-3.1% from 2016)
Land area	29,527.90 km^{2} (11,400.79 sq mi)
Population density	1.2/km^{2} (3.1/sq mi)
Median age
Private dwellings	17,244 (total) 15,261 (occupied)
Median household income

References: 2021

Historical census populations – Sept-Rivières Regional County Municipality
Year	Pop.	±%
2011	35,240	—
2016	35,441	+0.6%
2021	34,358	−3.1%
Population amounts include native reserves. Source: Statistics Canada

== Transportation ==
=== Access Routes ===
Highways and numbered routes that run through the municipality, including external routes that start or finish at the county border:

- Autoroutes
  - None
- Principal Highways
  - R-138
- Secondary Highways
  - None
- External Routes
  - None

== River basins ==
There are a number of large rivers that flow in a generally north-south direction through Sept-Rivières to enter the Gulf. Near the coast the river basins tend to narrow in towards the river mouth, and between their mouths are areas that drain into the Gulf through smaller streams. From west to east, the larger river basins, which may cover parts of neighboring regions, are:

River	Basin size		Mouth coordinates	Map link
River	km^{2}	sq. mile	Mouth coordinates	Map link
Pentecôte	1,986	767	49.7800000°N 67.1644444°W	EHOZH
Riverin	221	85	49.7855556°N 67.1563889°W	EHWEN
Aux Rochers	4,161	1,607	50.0194444°N 66.8686111°W	EHWSX
Dominique	263	102	50.0263889°N 66.8680556°W	EGEDF
Sainte-Marguerite	6,213	2,399	50.1427778°N 66.5966667°W	EJGWT
Rapides	573	221	50.2686111°N 66.4572222°W	EHURW
Moisie	19,273	7,441	50.2000000°N 66.067500°W	EHHGN
Matamec	679	262	50.2836111°N 65.9666667°W	EHEPE
Loups Marins	186	72	50.259167°N 65.744444°W	EHBME
Pigou	169	65	50.2702778°N 65.6272222°W	EHQOC

== See also ==
- List of regional county municipalities and equivalent territories in Quebec
