= Hart-Jaune Dam =

Dam in Quebec, Canada

- Location within Quebec
- Official name: Barrage de la Hart-Jaune
- Coordinates: 51.824092°N 67.804019°W

Upper dam and spillways
- Type of dam: Earthfill
- Impounds: Beaupré River
- Height (foundation): 22.9 metres (75 ft)
- Spillways: 1

Upper reservoir
- Creates: Petit lac Manicouagan
- Total capacity: 1,430,000,000 cubic metres (5.0×10^{10} cu ft)
- Catchment area: 4,553 square kilometres (1,758 sq mi)
- Surface area: 25,160 hectares (62,200 acres).

Lower dam and spillways
- Type of dam: Earth fill
- Impounds: Hart Jaune River
- Height (foundation): 24.7 metres (81 ft)
- Dam volume: 7,500,000 cubic metres (260,000,000 cu ft)

Power Station
- Coordinates: 51.785415°N 67.912261°W
- Operator: Hydro Quebec
- Commission date: 1960
- Turbines: 3
- Installed capacity: 51 MW

The Hart-Jaune Dam (French: Barrage de la Hart-Jaune) is a dam in Quebec, Canada. It crosses the Hart Jaune River where it leaves the Petit lac Manicouagan. It regulates the flow of water to the 45.5 MW Hart-Jaune generating station.

== Location ==
The Hart-Jaune Dam is in the unorganized territory of Rivière-Mouchalagane in Caniapiscau Regional County Municipality. Below the dam the Hart Jaune River flows through Lac Uishaukaniss and through a secondary dam into the power plant's reservoir. It enters the Hart-Jaune generating station at the southwest end of the reservoir. The dam is crossed by the Cartier Railway, which runs along the south shore of Petit lac Manicouagan. An access road leads from Quebec Route 389 up the river to the lower dam, and continues to the upper dam on the lake. The road is kept open year-round.

== History ==
The dam and power plant have their origin on 26 January 1957 when the Québec Cartier Mining Company was created by U.S. Steel to supply iron ore concentrate. On 21 February 1957 the Queen, with the advice and consent to the Legislative Council and the Legislative Assembly of Quebec, authorized leasing the water powers of the Hart-Jaune River and the Petit Lac Manicouagan, including the right to regulate the flow of the river and to store water in the lake. The new company spent $325 million to build the Lake Jeannine mining site, with the nearby town of Gagnon and Hart-Jaune power station, as well as the Cartier Railway leading to a port at Port-Cartier from which the first load of iron ore concentrate was shipped in June 1961.

The company made further investments in the 1970s at Mont-Wright, Fermont and Fire Lake, but during a steel market crisis in 1979−1985 was forced to shut down Lac-Jeannine, Gagnon and Fire Lake. (Note: In 1989 US Steel sold Quebec Cartier to a group consisting of Dofasco, Mitsui and Caemi. Dofasco acquired all the shares in 2005. In 2009 Quebec Cartier Dofasco became part of the steel giant ArcelorMittal.) Hart Jaune was listed among Hydro Quebec's generating stations in 1987.

In September 1998, following an environmental impact review, Hydro Quebec was given permission to undertake a back-filling project over a distance of 2,385 metres (7,825 ft) in Petit lac Manicouagan and the Hart Jaune river to rehabilitate the riprap protection of part of the upstream facing of the retaining structures for the Hart-Jaune complex. In 2012 Hydro Quebec commissioned a digital microwave link between Hart-Jaune and Manic-5. In July 2013 Hydro Quebec evacuated its personnel from the power station as a precautionary measure due to a major forest fire in the area.

== Main dam ==
The upper dam was built in 1960. It is operated by Hydro-Québec. It is in the basin of the Beaupré River, a tributary of the Manicouagan Reservoir. The earthfill dam is 22.9 metres (75 ft) high and holds 1,430,000,000 cubic metres (5.0×10^{10} cu ft). The reservoir covers 251.60 square kilometres (97.14 sq mi). The watershed covers 4,553 square kilometres (1,758 sq mi).

== Other structures ==
There is an intermediate dam between Lac Uishaukaniss and the reservoir of the power plant. This dam carries the railway leading to Lake Jeannine, once the main line of the Cartier Railway. There are several earthen structures on the reservoir about 8 kilometres (5.0 mi) below the main dam. These include four dykes, a secondary dam that provides a high-water outlet for the river, and the water intake dam that feeds the power station.

Structure	Coords	Height	Type	Capacity	
Structure	Coords	Height	Type	m^{3}	cu ft
Dyke HJ-6	51.791944°N 67.889167°W	0.8 metres (2 ft 7 in)	dyke	0	0
Secondary dam	51.790833°N 67.889167°W	4.8 metres (16 ft)	dam	3,500,000	120,000,000
Dyke HJ-3	51.788056°N 67.891667°W	4.8 metres (16 ft)	dyke	3,200,000	110,000,000
Dyke HJ-2	51.785278°N 67.9°W	4.8 metres (16 ft)	dyke	2,500,000	88,000,000
Dyke HJ-1	51.784167°N 67.901667°W	1.7 metres (5 ft 7 in)	dyke	0	0
Water intake dam	51.783056°N 67.910556°W	24.7 metres (81 ft)	dam	7,500,000	260,000,000

== Generating station ==
The Hart-Jaune generating station has an installed capacity of 51 MW from 3 turbines. It has a hydraulic head of 39.6 metres (130 ft). It came into service in 1960. In January the plant has a dependable maximum net capacity of 48 MW. In an emergency the Hart Jaune Power plant, which is connected to the Hydro-Quebec grid, can supply enough power for the essential processing facilities in ArcelorMittal's Mont-Wright facility.

== Sources ==
- 22O13-200-0101 Barrage Hart-Jaune (PDF) (in French), Ressources naturelles et Faune Quebec
- Annual Report 2011, ArcelorMittal
- Annual Report 2012 (PDF), Hydro Quebec
- Barrage de la Hart-Jaune (in French), Ressources naturelles Canada
- Centrales hydroélectriques (au 1er janvier 2019) (in French), Hydro Quebec
- "Décret 1133-98" (PDF), Gazette Officielle du Québec (in French), Gouvernement du Québec, 2 September 1998
- Elizabeth II (21 February 1957), Chapter 45 Forces hydrauliques sur la rivière Hart-Jaune
- Hart-Jaune, Barrage de la (in French), Ministère du Développement durable, de l’Environnement et de la Lutte contre les changements climatiques (MDDELCC)
- Hart Jaune Réservoir Inférieur, Liste des barrages (in French), Hydro Quebec
- Hydro-Québec Triennial Review of Resource Adequacy (PDF), Hydro-Québec, May 1999
- Malouin, Denise; Dubé, Éric (August 2014), Appel de Propositions 14698333 Aménagement de Hart-jaune Entretien Annuel des Routes & Aires de Service (PDF) (in French), Hydro Quebec
- Our History, ArcelorMittal
- Paradis, Steeve (17 September 2009), "La minière Québec Cartier fête ses 50 ans", La Presse (in French)
- Paradis, Steeve (12 July 2013), "Incendies de forêt: la Manicouagan sur un pied d'alerte", Le Soliel (in French)
- The Hydro-Quebec System in 1987 (PDF), archived from the original (PDF) on 2021-12-27
- "Unité d'aménagement 093-52" (PDF), Plan d'aménagement forestier intégré opérationnel 2013 - 2018 (in French), Ministère des Ressources naturelles, archived from the original (PDF) on 2021-12-27
