= Uapishka Biodiversity Reserve =

Protected area in Quebec, Canada

- Réserve de biodiversité Uapishka
- IUCN category II (national park) 555569775
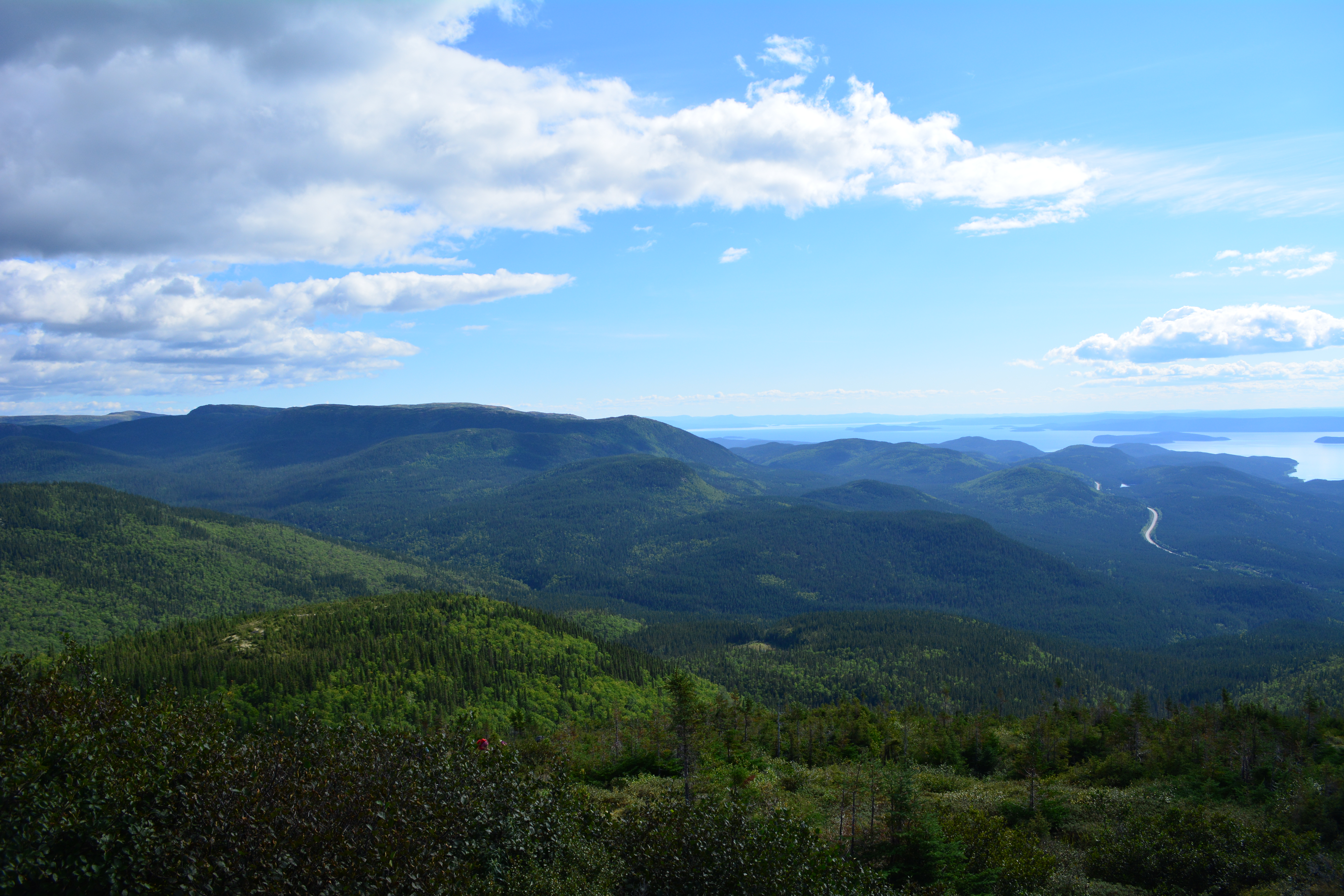
- View from Mount Harfang in Monts Groulx

- Location within Quebec
- Location: Lac-Walker, Quebec, Canada
- Coordinates: 51.547°N 67.956°W
- Area: 138,191 ha (533.56 sq mi)
- Designation: biodiversity reserve
- Created: 15 April 2009
- Administrator: Ministry of Sustainable Development, Environment, and Fight Against Climate Change

The Uapishka Biodiversity Reserve (French: Réserve de biodiversité Uapishka) is a protected area in the Côte-Nord region of Quebec. It is one of five biodiversity reserves in the province. It is to the east of the Manicouagan Reservoir and includes a large part of the Monts Groulx. It is also part of the central area of the Manicouagan Uapishka Biosphere Reserve.

== Name ==
The name Uapishka comes from the Innu name for the Groulx Mountains and means "always snowy rocky peaks" or "several white mountains".

== Geography ==
The Uapishka Biodiversity Reserve is located 325 kilometres (202 mi) north of Baie-Comeau. It is accessible by Quebec Route 389 from Baie-Comeau and Fermont. The reserve covers the western part of the Monts Groulx massif. It shares a boundary with the proposed Monts-Groulx biodiversity reserve, which has been excluded from the creation of the reserve in order to give it the status of ecological reserve, a superior protection status.

The reserve is located in the unorganized territories of Rivière-Mouchalagane, Rivière-aux-Outardes and Lac-Walker, which are respectively in the Caniapiscau, Manicouagan and Sept-Rivières regional county municipalities.

The Groulx Mountains form a tabular massif consisting of a long high plateau with several slightly convex peaks exceeding 1,000 metres (3,300 ft) elevation. The elevation varies from 360 metres (1,180 ft) on the shores of the Manicouagan Reservoir to 1,104 metres (3,622 ft) at the top of Mount Veyrier. The Monts Groulx massif is the third largest massif in Quebec by size and the sixth highest.

The Groulx Mountains are part of the Grenville Province, a geological division of the Canadian Shield. They are composed of Precambrian rocks that have been deformed during the Labrador and Grenville orogenies. The massif is composed mostly of gabbro-norite, a mafic rock rich in magnesium and iron. The northern part of the massif is mostly composed of anorthosite and the east of gneiss and paragneiss. The rock is visible in outcrops at the top, while the slopes are covered with glacial till deposits up to a few meters thick. The valley bottoms are composed of alluvial deposits laid down by rivers and sandy deposits from glaciers that are often covered with peat.

The reserve is located entirely in the basin of the Manicouagan River. It serves as a source for the Toulnustouc, Hart Jaune and Manicouagan rivers. The internal hydrographic network of the reserve is composed of about twenty small lakes and head streams.

== Environment ==
The flora of the reserve varies according to elevation. Lower down the vegetation is mostly black spruce (Picea mariana) and balsam fir (Abies balsamea), mixed with white spruce (Picea glauca) at about 700 metres (2,300 ft), white birch (Betula papyrifera) and trembling aspen (Populus tremuloides). Above 700 metres (2,300 ft) the white spruce becomes more common and deciduous trees disappear. Above 800 metres (2,600 ft) the forest becomes more sparse with krummholz stands of spruce and fir in the most exposed areas. The tree line is around 900 metres (3,000 ft), above which is alpine heath.

Four species at risk are located in the reserve: alpine lady-fern (Athyrium distentifolium var.americum), orange agoseris (Agoseris aurantiaca), highland cudweed (Gnaphalium norvegicum), and clustered lady's mantle (Alchemilla glomerulans). There are twelve exceptional forest ecosystems on the reserve, mostly old white montane spruce forests that have never been logged or impacted by major natural disturbances.

Wildlife includes several species of interest. There are six animal species on the reserve that benefit from protection status: wolverine (Gulo gulo), boreal woodland caribou (Rangifer tarandus caribou), golden eagle (Aquila chrysaetos), bald eagle (Haliaeetus leucocephalus), rock vole (Microtus chrotorrhinus) and least weasel (Mustela nivalis). Three other species are also considered of "heritage interest", the willow ptarmigan (Lagopus lagopus), osprey (Pandion haliaetus) and rough-legged buzzard (Buteo lagopus).

== People ==
The reserve is crossed by six traplines for the use of the Innu of Pessamit and Uashat-Maliotenam. Obtaining reserve status has not changed their traditional rights and practices. Three hiking trails provide access to the Monts Groulx from km 335, 365 and 350 (winter only) of Route 389. The Monts Groulx are visited annually by about 500 people who come to practice hiking, snowshoeing, telemark skiing and dog sledding. Snowmobiling is limited to elevations below 800 metres (2,600 ft).

== Sources ==
- Gouvernement du Québec (2009), Plan de conservation, réserve de biodiversité Uapishka (PDF) (in French), Québec, Ministère du Développement durable, de l’Environnement et des Parcs, Direction du patrimoine écologique et des parcs., p. 27
- Réserve de biodiversité Uapishka (in French), Commission de toponymie du Québec
