= List of company towns in Canada =

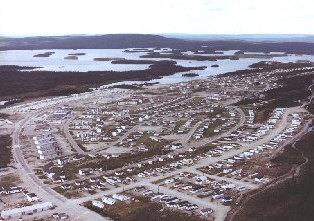
Gagnon, Quebec, an iron mining company town of Québec Cartier Mining Company, abandoned in 1985

This is a list of current and former company towns in Canada. True company towns are those "closed communities owned and administered by the industrial employer". Other rural communities which did not function strictly in this way but were still dominated by a single industry may also be called company towns and are featured in this list.

Their formation were common in the early and mid 20th century, with the mining and pulp and paper industries making up the bulk of the towns. Many of these towns were planned communities, with their developers choosing for them unique design plans, such as the Garden city movement in the case of Kapuskasing, Ontario and Kitimat, British Columbia.

Few company towns remain in Canada, as most have been abandoned or since incorporated into a municipality. The only remaining example of a company town today may be Churchill Falls, Newfoundland and Labrador, an unincorporated community home to Nalcor Energy's Churchill Falls Generating Station.

== British Columbia ==
Community	Founded	Company	Industry	Status	Refs
Allenby			Copper mining	Abandoned	
Anyox	1914	Granby Consolidated	Copper smelting	Abandoned in 1935	
Bamberton	1912	Associated Cement Company	Cement plant	Abandoned in 1980	
Barkley Valley			Gold mining	Abandoned	
Blakeburn			Coal mining	Abandoned	
Blubber Bay		Domtar Chemical Company	Limestone quarrying	Mostly depopulated	
Bralorne			Gold mining	Mostly depopulated	
Brexton	1931	Bridge River Exploration Company	Gold mining	Abandoned	
Bridge River		Bridge River Power Project	Hydropower	Mostly depopulated	
Britannia Beach	1900	Britannia Mining and Smelting Co.	Copper and gold mining		
Camp McKinney	1896		Gold mining	Abandoned in 1903	
Cassiar	1952	Cassiar Asbestos Company	Asbestos mining	Abandoned in 1990s	
Cassidy		Granby Company	Coal mining		
Clayburn	1905	Vancouver Fireclay Company	Brickmaking	Now part of Abbotsford	
Coalmont	1911	Columbia Coal and Coke	Coal mining		
Copper Mountain		Granby Company	Copper mining	Abandoned 1958	
Fraser Mills	1889	Crown Zellerbach	Sawmilling, pulp and paper	Now part of Coquitlam	
Gold River	1967		Logging, pulp and paper	Now incorporated	
Harmac			Pulp and paper	Abandoned	
Hendrix Lake			Mining	Abandoned	
IOCO		Imperial Oil Company	Oil	Abandoned.	
Jedway		Granby Company	Iron mining	Abandoned in 1969	
Juskatla	1940s		Logging	Abandoned	
Kemano	1950s	Alcan	Hydropower	Abandoned in 2000	
Kimberley	1909	Cominco Ltd.	Lead and zinc mining	Now incorporated	
Kitimat	1951	Alcan	Aluminium smelting	Now incorporated	
Kitsault	1979	Phelps Dodge	Molybdenum mining	Now private	
Maillardville	1889	Crown Zellerbach	Sawmilling, pulp and paper	Now part of Coquitlam	
Minto City	1934		Gold mining		
Mount Sheer	1900	Britannia Mining and Smelting Co.	Copper and gold mining		
Nitinat		Crown Zellerbach	Sawmilling, pulp and paper		
Ocean Falls	1906	Bella Coola Pulp and Paper Co. Crown Zellerbach Oceanfalls Corporation BC Government Crown Corporation	Pulp paper and Power	Mostly depopulated	
Pioneer Mine			Gold mining	Abandoned	
Port Belmont	1918		Gold mining	Abandoned in 1926	
Port Hammond	1910s		Pulp and paper	Now part of Maple Ridge	
Port Mellon		Howe Sound Pulp and Paper Corp.	Pulp and paper		
Powell River	1910	The Powell River Company	Pulp and paper	Now part of City of Powell River	
Premier	1918		Gold mining	Abandoned in 1953	
Red Gap	1912	Straits Lumber Co.	Sawmilling	Abandoned	
Stewart	1930		Gold mining	Now incorporated	
Tasu	1918		Copper and gold mining	Abandoned in 1980s	
Tumbler Ridge	1981	BC Resources Investment Co.	Coal mining	Now incorporated	
Van Anda		Van Anda Copper & Gold Mining Co.	Copper and gold mining	Mostly depopulated	
Woodfibre		Whalen Pulp and Paper Company	Pulp and paper	Mostly depopulated	

== Manitoba ==
Community	Founded	Company	Industry	Status	Refs
Flin Flon	1927	Hudbay	Copper and zinc mining	Now incorporated	
Sherridon		Sherritt Gordon	Nickel mining	Mostly depopulated	
Thompson	1956	Inco Ltd.	Nickel mining	Now incorporated	
Pine Falls	1926	Manitoba Pulp & Paper Co.	Pulp & Paper	Now Incorporated	

== New Brunswick ==
Community	Founded	Company	Industry	Status	Refs
Marysville	1862	Marysville Cotton Mill	Cotton and lumber	Now part of Fredericton	

== Newfoundland and Labrador ==
Community	Founded	Company	Industry	Status	Refs
Buchans	1927	ASARCO	Mining	Incorporated in 1979.	
Churchill Falls	1961	Newfoundland & Labrador Hydro	Hydropower	Still a company town	
Grand Falls	1905	Anglo-Newfoundland Development Co.	Pulp and paper	Now incorporated	
Labrador City	1960s	Iron Ore Company of Canada	Iron mining	Now incorporated	
Wabush	1962	Wabush Mines	Iron mining	Now incorporated	

== Nova Scotia ==
Community	Founded	Company	Industry	Status	Refs
Broughton	1905	Breton Coal, Iron & Railway Co.	Coal mining	Mostly depopulated	
New Waterford			Coal mining	Now part of Cape Breton RM	

== Nunavut ==
Community	Founded	Company	Industry	Status	Refs
Nanisivik	1975	Breakwater Resources	Lead and zinc mining	Abandoned in 2002	

== Ontario ==
Community	Founded	Company	Industry	Status	Refs
Batawa	1939	Bata Shoe Company	Shoemaking	Now part of Quinte West	
Burchell Lake	1959	North Coldsteam Mines Limited	Copper mining	Abandoned in 1967	
Creighton	1900	Inco Ltd.	Mining	Abandoned in 1988	
Dubreuilville	1961	Dubreuil Brothers lumber company	Sawmilling	Now incorporated	
Espanola	1900s	{{ Espanola Power & Paper Co. Ltd.E.B Eddy Forest Products Co. Ltd. 1996 to 2025 Domtar	Pulp and paper	Now incorporated	
Iroquois Falls	1912	Abitibi Power and Paper Company	Pulp and paper	Now incorporated	
Jerome Mine	1937	Mining Corporation of Canada	Gold mining	Abandoned	
Kapuskasing		Kimberly-Clark Forest Products	Pulp and paper	Now incorporated	
Killarney				Mostly depopulated	
Manitouwadge	1953	General Engineering Co Limited	Copper extraction	Now incorporated	
Ramsey Also site for E.B Eddy Forest Product Co. Lumber camp and forestry operations base camp till being ultimately deemed money losing and deemed not cost efficient and economically viable and shut down by Domtar Corp 1997	1937	Mining Corporation of Canada	Gold mining	Abandoned raised and burned	
Smooth Rock Falls	approx. 1930's	Abitibi / Tembec / Malette	Pulp and Power	Closed in 2006 Incorporated as municipality long before mill closure. Current status is that the town is in transition	
Terrace Bay	1947	Kimberly-Clark Forest Products/ Buchanan Forest James River/ AV Terrace Bay current owners but mill is in care and control.	Pulp and paper	Now incorporated	
Timmins	1912	Hollinger Mines	Gold mining	Now incorporated	
Walkerville	1890	Hiram Walker and Sons Ltd.	Distilling	Now part of Windsor	

== Quebec ==
Community	Founded	Company	Industry	Status	Refs
Arvida	1927	Alcoa	Aluminium smelting	Now part of Saguenay	
Fermont	1971	Québec Cartier Mining Company	Iron mining	Now incorporated	
Gagnon	1957	Québec Cartier Mining Company	Iron mining	Abandoned in 1985	
Schefferville	1954	Iron Ore Company of Canada	Iron mining	Now incorporated	

== Saskatchewan ==
Community	Founded	Company	Industry	Status	Refs
Eldorado	1946	Eldorado Mining and Refining	Uranium mining	Abandoned	
Goldfields	1936	Cominco Ltd.	Gold mining	Abandoned	
Uranium City	1956	Eldorado Mining and Refining	Uranium mining	Incorporated and since dissolved	

== Yukon ==
Community	Founded	Company	Industry	Status	Refs
Clinton Creek	1967	Cassiar Asbestos Corporation	Asbestos mining	Abandoned in 1978	
Elsa	1935	Treadwell/United Keno Hill	Lead, silver, and zinc mining	Abandoned in 1989	
Keno City		Hecla Mining	Lead and zinc mining	Mostly depopulated	

== See also ==
- Category:Company towns in Canada
- List of canning towns in British Columbia
- List of historic mining communities
- List of Hudson's Bay Company trading posts
- List of planned cities in Canada
