= Petit lac Manicouagan =

Reservoir in Quebec, Canada

- Location in Quebec
- Coordinates: 51.89278°N 67.72556°W
- Catchment area: 4,553 square kilometres (1,758 sq mi)
- Designation: Lake/reservoir
- Surface area: 25,160 hectares (62,200 acres)
- Water volume: 1,430,000,000 cubic metres (5.0×10^{10} cu ft)

The Petit lac Manicouagan (Little Manicouagan Lake) is a lake in the Côte-Nord region of Quebec, Canada. It is impounded by the Hart-Jaune Dam at its outlet to the Hart Jaune River.

== Location ==
The Petit lac Manicouagan is in the unorganized territory of Rivière-Mouchalagane, Caniapiscau. It is to the east of Quebec Route 389. The Cartier Railway runs along the southeast shore of the lake. The railway enters the southern tip of the lakeshore through a narrow gorge that leads to the headwaters of the Northeast Toulnustouc River. The lake is divided between the cantons of Hesry (NW), Fagundez (SW), Le Courtois (SE) and Leventoux (NE). The northern tip is in the canton of Tilly. The southern arm extends into the canton of Forgues.

The Petit lac Manicouagan is in the watershed of the Beaupré River, a tributary of the Manicouagan Reservoir. The lake contains 1,430,000,000 cubic metres (5.0×10^{10} cu ft) of water and covers 251.60 square kilometres (97.14 sq mi). The watershed covers 4,553 square kilometres (1,758 sq mi).

== Name ==
The Innu word Manicouagan has been taken to mean "where bark is taken" or "drinking vessel". The related term Mrnikuanistuku Shipu means "river by the cup". Père Lemoine mentions two meanings: "place where we remove birch bark" and "Where we give a drink". Possibly the terms are connected, since birch bark was used to make a bowl to drink water. The Commission de toponymie du Québec has speculated that the Petit lac Manicouagan was named because of its spoon shape.

== Natural resource use and conservation ==
The Uapishka Biodiversity Reserve protects the Monts Groulx massif to the south of the lake and the Hart Jaune River. A population of Caribou has made use of the region around the lake in the past. This group was near the southern limit for caribou in 1972, although in the past caribou had ranged much further south. The Petit Lac Manicouagan population was hunted in fall in the 1970s and 1980s, and in winter in the 1990s. The fall harvest decreased during the 1970s and 1980s. The harvest was much higher in the winter. Some caribou herds have been in sharp decline, and as of 2017 it was not known whether the Petit lac Manicouagan herd still existed. Parts of the southwest shore of the lake are in the Bersimis (Pessamit) Reserve, a recognized beaver reserve. The Betsiamites (Pessamit) heritage site includes 652 square kilometres (252 sq mi) around the Hart Jaune River and the Petit lac Manicouagan.

== Dam ==
The Hart-Jaune dam and power plant have their origin on 26 January 1957 when the Québec Cartier Mining Company was created by U.S. Steel to supply iron ore concentrate. On 21 February 1957 the Queen, with the advice and consent to the Legislative Council and the Legislative Assembly of Quebec, authorized leasing the water powers of the Hart-Jaune River and the Petit Lac Manicouagan, including the right to regulate the flow of the river and to store water in the lake. The dam was built in 1960. In September 1998, following an environmental impact review, Hydro Quebec was given permission to undertake a back-filling project over a distance of 2,385 metres (7,825 ft) in Petit lac Manicouagan and the Hart Jaune river to rehabilitate the riprap protection of part of the upstream facing of the retaining structures for the Hart-Jaune complex. The dam has affected the free movement of fish.

== Forecasting ==
The Petit Lac Manicouagan basin is one of five catchment basins in the Manicouagan watershed, the others being Manic-5, Toulnoustouc, Manic-3 and Manic-2. Daily meteorological forecasts for each basin are used to derive streamflow predictions. Studies of data for these watersheds has shown that accuracy can be improved significantly by combining data from several sources, followed by statistical post-processing. This can in turn lead to improvements in dam operation management..

== Sources ==
- "Annexe 4.6 Sites patrimoniaux sur territoire public" (PDF), Demande de révision de l'Assemblée des Premières Nations du Québec et du Labrador, de la décision (in French), 2006
- Courbariaux, Marie; Barbillon, Pierre; Perreault, Luc; Parent, Éric (7 March 2019), Post-processing multi-ensemble temperature and precipitation forecasts through an Exchangeable Gamma Normal model and its Tobit extension, arXiv:1804.09233, doi:10.1007/s13253-019-00358-2, S2CID 88516365
- Courtois, Rehaume; Ouellet, Jean-pierre; Gingras, André; Dussault, Claude; Breton, Laurier; Maltais, Jean (2003), "Historical Changes and Current Distribution of Caribou, Rangifer tarandus, in Quebec", The Canadian Field-Naturalist, 117 (3): 399, doi:10.22621/cfn.v117i3.742
- "Décret 1133-98" (PDF), Gazette Officielle du Québec (in French), Gouvernement du Québec, 2 September 1998
- Dulude, Pierre; Beaulieu, Jason (2009), Côte-Nord Plan régional de conservation des milieux humides et de leurs terres hautes adjacentes (PDF) (in French), Canards Illimités Canada
- Elizabeth II (21 February 1957), Chapter 45 Forces hydrauliques sur la rivière Hart-Jaune
- Environnement Canada (2008), "Annexe 6.3", Examen scientifique aux fins de la désignation de l'habitat essentiel de la population boréale du caribou des bois (Rangifer tarandus caribou) au Canada., Ottawa
- Hart-Jaune, Barrage de la (in French), Ministère du Développement durable, de l’Environnement et de la Lutte contre les changements climatiques (MDDELCC)
- Jean, Paul-Émile; Frenette, Pierre (2011), Répertoire historique et explicatif des noms de rues et avenues de Baie-Comeau (PDF), Ville de Baie-Comeau
- Our History, ArcelorMittal
- Petit lac Manicouagan, Natural Resources Canada
- Regulation respecting beaver reserves, CQLR c C-61.1, r 28
- Réserve de biodiversité Uapishka (PDF) (map), Ministère du Développement durable, de l’Environnement et de la Lutte contre les changements climatiques (MDDELCC)
- RMBMU (August 2017), Examen périodique 2007 à 2017 de la Réserve de la biosphère de Manicouagan-Uapishka – Rapport final (PDF) (in French), Baie-Comeau
- Santerre, R. (March 2002), "Des arpenteurs-géomètres honorés dans la toponymie du Québec", Géomatique, Revue de l'Ordre des arpenteurs-géomètres du Québec (in French)
