= Grand lac Caotibi =

Lake in Quebec, Canada

- Northeast Toulnustouc south basin

- Location within Quebec Location within Canada
- Coordinates: 50.7317°N 67.5528°W
- Basin countries: Canada

The Grand lac Caotibi is a lake in Quebec, Canada.

== Location ==
The Grand lac Caotibi is on the northern slope of the Gulf of St. Lawrence basin about 90 kilometres (56 mi) northwest of Sept-Îles. It is in the Duplessis tourist region of Côte-Nord. The lake is in the unorganized territory of Lac-Walker, Sept-Rivières Regional County Municipality, Quebec. As of November 2021 the Commission de toponymie of Quebec had not determined the origin or meaning of the name.

== Hydrology ==
The Grand lac Caotibi is elongated, in a north-south direction, with a western portion connected to the main lake by a channel. Lac Arthur empties into Grand lac Caotibi, which in turn drains north through Petit lac Caotibi into the Northeast Toulnustouc River.

== Land use ==
The Cartier Railway runs along the east of the lake, between it and Lac Arthur further to the east. The line runs from Port-Cartier on the Gulf of St. Lawrence north past Petit lac Manicouagan to the Mont Wright mine, southwest of Labrador City. On 22 August 1957 the Quebec government reserved an area of land 1 mile (1.6 km) on each side of the railway and on each side of Grand Lac Caotibi and Petit Lac Caotibi, and including the lakes, on which mining claims could no longer be staked.

During public consultations on land use in the area held in 2016-2019, concerns were raised about maintaining the quality and productivity of the aquatic ecosystems of several strategic lakes in the wildlife reserve. These were Grand lac Coatibi, Lake Arthur and Lac du Nord-Est. Access to the south of Petit lac Caotibi for conservation purposes was requested. Harvesting of timber should be restricted to 50% of the basins of the strategic lakes and their main tributaries, and no cuts should be allowed between the lakes and the railway where the railway ran less than 200 metres (660 ft) from the lakes. No watercourse crossings should be allowed within the first 100 metres (330 ft) of the tributaries of Grand lac Caotibi or Lac Bourgeois.

== Sources ==
- "Grand lac Caotibi", CGNDB: Canadian Geographical Names Database, Government of Canada
- Grand lac Caotibi, Commission de toponymie
- "Grand-Lac-Caotibi (lac)", Mémoire du Québec
- "Order in Council 845", Quebec Official Gazaette, 89 (37), 22 August 1957
- Rapport de Suivi des Consultations Publiques PAFIO (2016 - 2019), Ministère des Forêts, de la Faune et des Parcs, 2019
- "Relation: Grand lac Caotibi (11683562)", OpenStreetMap
- Réserve Faunique de Port‑Cartier–Sept‑Îles, Sépaq
