= Petit lac Caotibi =

Lake in Quebec, Canada

- Northeast Toulnustouc south basin

- Location within Quebec Location within Canada
- Coordinates: 50.8658°N 67.5417°W
- Basin countries: Canada
- Surface elevation: 474 metres (1,555 ft)

The Petit lac Caotibi is a lake in Quebec, Canada.

== Location ==
The Petit lac Caotibi is on the northern slope of the Gulf of St. Lawrence basin about 90 kilometres (56 mi) northwest of Sept-Îles. It is in the unorganized territory of Lac-Walker, Sept-Rivières Regional County Municipality, Quebec. As of November 2021 the Commission de toponymie of Quebec had not determined the origin or meaning of the name.

== Hydrology ==
The Petit lac Caotibi has an irregular shape, with a smaller western portion joining a larger eastern portion through a channel. It is fed from the Grand lac Caotibi to the south, which in turn is fed from Lake Arthur. It drains north into the Northeast Toulnustouc River.

== Land use ==
The Cartier Railway runs along the east of the lake. The line runs from Port-Cartier on the Gulf of St. Lawrence north past Petit lac Manicouagan to the Mont Wright mine, southwest of Labrador City. On 22 August 1957 the Quebec government reserved an area of land 1 mile (1.6 km) on each side of the railway and on each side of Grand Lac Caotibi and Petit Lac Caotibi, and including the lakes, on which mining claims could no longer be staked.

During public consultations on land use in the area held in 2016-2019, concerns were raised about maintaining the quality and productivity of the aquatic ecosystems of several strategic lakes in the wildlife reserve. These were Grand lac Coatibi, Lake Arthur and Lac du Nord-Est. Access to the south of Petit lac Caotibi for conservation purposes was requested. Harvesting of timber should be restricted to 50% of the basins of the strategic lakes and their main tributaries, and no cuts should be allowed between the lakes and the railway where the railway ran less than 200 metres (660 ft) from the lakes.

== Sources ==
- "Order in Council 845", Quebec Official Gazaette, 89 (37), 22 August 1957
- "Petit lac Caotibi", CGNDB: Canadian Geographical Names Database, Government of Canada
- Petit lac Caotibi, Commission de toponymie
- Rapport de Suivi des Consultations Publiques PAFIO (2016 - 2019), Ministère des Forêts, de la Faune et des Parcs, 2019
- "Relation: Grand lac Caotibi (11683562)", OpenStreetMap
- Réserve Faunique de Port‑Cartier–Sept‑Îles, Sépaq
