= Lake Jeannine =

Lake in Rivière-Mouchalagane, Quebec, Canada

- Lac Jeannine (French)
- Location within Quebec
- Location: Rivière-Mouchalagane, Caniapiscau, Quebec
- Coordinates: 51.8705556°N 68.0672222°W
- Max. length: 1.7 kilometres (1.1 mi)
- Max. width: 800 metres (2,600 ft)

Lake Jeannine (French: Lac Jeannine) is a small lake in the Côte-Nord region of Quebec, Canada. It was the site of a major iron ore mining operation in the 1960s and 1970s.

== Location ==
Lac Jeannine is in the unorganized territory of Rivière-Mouchalagane, Caniapiscau, Quebec. It is just east of Quebec Route 389. Lac Jeannine is 8 kilometres (5.0 mi) from Gagnon, which was closed in 1985 and is now a ghost town. The lake is 1.7 kilometres (1.1 mi) long and 800 metres (2,600 ft) wide. A watercourse drains the lake through the mine dumps and a series of small lakes before running into the Manicouagan Reservoir. The lake's name seems to have been given by a prospector for the Québec Cartier Mining Company who was part of the team that discovered the rich deposit of iron ore in 1957.

== Mining operation ==
The mining operation has its origin on 26 January 1957 when the Québec Cartier Mining Company was created by U.S. Steel to supply iron ore concentrate. The mine, the town to support 4,000 people, the Hart-Jaune power station and the railway linking the mine to Port-Cartier were built between 1958 and 1961. The cost was $325 million. The first load of iron ore concentrate was shipped in June 1961. From then until 1976 the mine employed more than 1,000 workers.The ore processing plant at Lac Jeannine had 12 identical processing lines. The first stage was autogenous grinding, and then the ore was separated using a gravimetric circuit with spiral classifiers. The ore from the circuit was filtered, and then shipped by rail to Port-Cartier.

The deposit was 701 metres (2,300 ft) long, 243 metres (797 ft) wide and 304 metres (997 ft) deep. It yielded over 266 million tons with an average concentration of 33%. The iron mine was in production from 1961 to 1976. The company made further investments in the 1970s at Mont-Wright, Fermont and Fire Lake, but during a steel market crisis was forced to shut down Lac-Jeannine. The mill at Lac Jeannine continued to treat iron ore from Fire Lake until 1985. That year the mill and the town of Gagnon were closed.

The accessible part of the tailings, about 127 million tons in a sub-aerial pile, cover about 2.7 square kilometres (1.0 sq mi). They are just under 10% iron. Another 26 million tons were deposited in the open pit mine, which has since flooded. In February 2007 it was announced that Quinto Mining of British Columbia had acquired an option of the iron tailings at the former mine.

== Sources ==
- "Iron Ore Tailings – Quinto acquires Lac Jeannine material", Canadian Mining Journal, The Northern Miner Group, 14 February 2007
- Lac Jeannine (in French), Commission de toponymie du Québec
- Lac Jeannine, Natural Resources Canada
- "Lac Jeannine Rivière Mouchalagane", Mindat
- Lavoie, François (18 July 2015), Characterization of the Lac Jeannine Tailings Material (PDF), Cartier Iron Corporation
- Our History, ArcelorMittal
