= Cartier Railway =

Canadian privately owned railway

Overview
- Headquarters: Port Cartier
- Reporting mark: AMMC
- Dates of operation: 1960–Present

Technical
- Track gauge: 1,435 mm (4 ft 8 1/2 in) standard gauge
- Length: 260 miles (418 km)

The Cartier Railway (reporting marks AMMC, AMIC, AMC) (formerly CFC and QCM) is a privately owned railway that operates 260 miles (418 km) of track in the Canadian province of Québec.

It is operated by the Cartier Railway Company, a wholly owned subsidiary of Arcelor Mittal, formerly Québec Cartier Mining Company.

The railway connects the company's huge iron ore mine at Mont-Wright in Northeastern Québec with the company's processing plant and port at Port-Cartier, formerly Shelter Bay, which is located on the northern banks of the St. Lawrence River.

The Cartier Railway has 26 locomotives, over 950 ore cars, 300 utility cars, and various other pieces of maintenance equipment.

The railway, along with other Northeastern Québec railways, including the Tshiuetin Rail Transportation line, the Quebec North Shore and Labrador Railway and the Arnaud Railway is completely isolated from any other railway network in North America. Although the other railways connect to each other, they do not have any direct connections to this railway, making this one completely isolated from any other railway, aside from rail ferry service via COGEMA to the CN Rail port at Matane, Quebec.

== Beginnings ==
In 1958, United States Steel formed the Québec Cartier Mining Company to construct an iron-ore mine in the iron-rich Quebec-Labrador Trough, a 40-by-600-mile (64 by 966 km) long band which cuts through the vast Canadian Shield. Earlier exploration by mine geologists discovered a large deposit in the Trough near Lac Jeannine, about 186 miles (299 km) north of the small town of Shelter Bay, which was located on the northern banks of the St. Lawrence River.

In 1959, Shelter Bay, now renamed Port Cartier, was ready for use allowing easier delivery of equipment for the mine and railway, which were still under construction. Construction was completed on the 190-mile (306 km) railway line between Port Cartier and Lac Jeannine on December 19, 1960.

The first trainload of iron concentrate left Lac Jeannine on December 16, 1960. Concentrate was stockpiled at Port Cartier while the mine and concentrator were gearing up for full production and the first shipload of concentrate departed the port on July 5, 1961.

== Railway ==
The Cartier Railway is an engineering marvel, and was constructed using all the modern, state-of-the art techniques available at the time, including making extensive use of aerial mapping to select the best route through the very mountainous terrain.

The initial 190-mile (306 km) rail line used natural drainage extensively by following the Rochers and Toulnustouc River valleys to keep the grades at a minimum. The ruling grade for southbound loaded trains was kept to a very easy 0.4% while the northbound ruling grade was only 1.35%.

Numerous rock cuts had to be blasted and five tunnels, ranging from 350 to 1,440 feet (110 to 440 m), were built where rock cuts were not possible. The heavy-haul nature of this railway required all sections of its mainline, including sidings and yard tracks, to be constructed using very sturdy 132-pound-per-yard (65 kg/m) rail in 78-foot (24 m) lengths. Since curves account for 54.3% of the main line, extensive use of flange oilers was needed. The oilers were located every 8 miles (13 km) or 250 degrees of curvature, whichever was less.

Granite, blasted and removed during construction of the harbour at Port Cartier was crushed and used as ballast on the first 54 miles (87 km) of the line, while local pit-run gravel was used for the remainder. Twenty-two bridges were needed for the railway, with the bridge at Milepost 68.5 being the longest (880 feet or 270 metres) and highest (120 feet or 37 metres) on the line. The railway also required the construction of 1,524 culverts for drainage.

The entire line was equipped with Centralized Traffic Control from the very beginning and the railway has twelve sidings between Port-Cartier and Lac Jeannine, named in alphabetical order from south to north. The siding names are Able, Baker, Charles, Dog, Eva, Fox, Georges, Howe, Item, Jig, Kay, and Love.

All sidings are 6,600 ft (2,012 m) in length except for Fox which is 12,090 ft (3,685 m) and Love at 14,200 ft (4,328 m). Since southbound loaded ore trains never enter the sidings, the south ends of each siding have power switches while the north ends have spring switches. However, both Fox and Love sidings have power switches at both ends.

== Route ==
From Port-Cartier the railway runs northwest along the Aux Rochers River valley and north along the east shore of Lake Quatre Lieues before running west and then north along the MacDonald River valley beside the proposed Lake Walker National Park as far as Lac Valilée. The railway continues northwest to Lake Bourgeois, and runs northward up the east shore of this lake and then of Grand lac Caotibi, running between this lake and Lake Arthur. It then follows the east shore of Petit lac Caotibi to the Rivière Toulnustouc Nord-Est, and follows this river valley northeast and then north past Lac Cartier. Through almost all of this southern section the railway runs through the Port-Cartier–Sept-Îles Wildlife Reserve. The railway continues to follow the Rivière Toulnustouc Nord-Est north and then northwest, then runs northwest to Petit lac Manicouagan. It follows the south and west shores of this lake, crossing the Hart-Jaune Dam over the Hart Jaune River. From here it runs north of northwest across marshy terrain to Mont-Wright. In its last section the railway runs beside Quebec Route 389.

== Initial operations and expansion ==
Initial operations consisted of 150-car, 19,000 ton ore trains pulled by five diesel locomotives.

The startup fleet of locomotives consisted of nine General Motors Diesel Division GP9 locomotives and eight Montreal Locomotive Works RS-18 locomotives. A fleet of 500 ore cars was constructed by Canadian Car and Foundry.

The first full year saw 8,130,000 tons of concentrate shipped with three trainsets cycling between Lac Jeannine and Port-Cartier. Winter operations would see trains' length dropped down to as few as 90 cars with more trainsets added to keep up with production.

The railway would move an average of eight to nine million tons for the next ten years.

One of the biggest problems faced by the Cartier Railway during the winter months was keeping the concentrate from freezing to the sides of the ore cars, which could make dumping the concentrate a very slow process. The solution to this problem was to line the insides of the ore cars with styrofoam sheets which were then covered with plywood. Steam was injected into the plywood/styrofoam liner at the mine and it would keep the ore insulated until it reached the unloader at Port-Cartier.

In 1972, as the original Lac Jeannine deposit was starting to run out, the railway was extended an additional 86 miles (138 km) to a new ore deposit located near Mont Wright. Morrison-Knudsen was the construction company that built the extension. The new line departed the original line at Milepost 174, just north of Love Siding. This location was named South Junction by the railway. The terrain was much milder on the new extension and only five bridges needed to be constructed.

Six additional 6,600 ft (2,012 m) sidings were constructed and continued the alphabetical naming. These sidings are named Mike, Nan, Oboe, Pat, Queen, and Rob. Production at the Mont Wright mine was planned at 19 million tons per year, requiring additional railway equipment to handle the additional volume.

Six M636 locomotives were purchased from Montreal Locomotive Works, while Marine Industries of Sorel, Québec built 130 additional ore cars.

One of the new M636 locomotives would have an extremely short career. On May 31, 1972, M636 #72, along with GP9's 52 and 58 and RS-18 61, ran away and derailed along with 134 ore cars on the grade, Milepost 62.4 between the sidings of Dog and Eva. Both crew members and an unauthorized passenger were killed and all units, including #72, just on its second trip, were written off and scrapped on the spot. The accident was believed to be caused by crew fatigue.

The railway suddenly found itself short of equipment again and fellow U.S. Steel railway Bessemer & Lake Erie sent four of its ALCO RSD-15 locomotives to the Cartier Railway in June 1972. Two more RSD-15's headed north in 1973. The Cartier Railway also acquired from Morrison-Knudsen three ALCO C636 demonstrators, which were used during construction of the Mont Wright extension.

Finally in 1973, the Duluth, Missabe & Iron Range sent three ALCO C630 locomotives to the Cartier Railway, with 7 more arriving in 1976. These units were oddballs on the DM&IR because the rest of their fleet was all Electro-Motive Division units, but they fit in very well on the Cartier Railway. Several more M636s were purchased new from MLW during 1976, as well as several acquired used from the Canadian National.

By 2002, the old ALCO and MLW locomotives were being replaced by newer General Electric AC4400CWs.

== Roster ==
The Cartier Railway's fleet, as of March 2020, consists of:

Number	Type	Manufacturer and dates	Notes
11-12, 13-17, 18-29	GE AC4400CW	GE Rail (2001-2007)	Introduced as a replacement to the M636, and by far the newest locomotives.
30-39	ALCO C630	ALCO (1966)	
51, 53-57, 59	EMD GP9	GM Diesel (1960)	Small switching locomotives.
62-68	MLW RS18	MLW (1959-1960)	
91-96	ALCO RSD15	ALCO (1959)	

== See also ==
- COGEMA

Preceded by South Kansas and Oklahoma Railroad	Regional Railroad of the Year; 2023	Succeeded by Wheeling & Lake Erie Railway
