= Fire Lake, Quebec =

Lake in Quebec, Canada

Fire Lake
- Lac Fire (French)
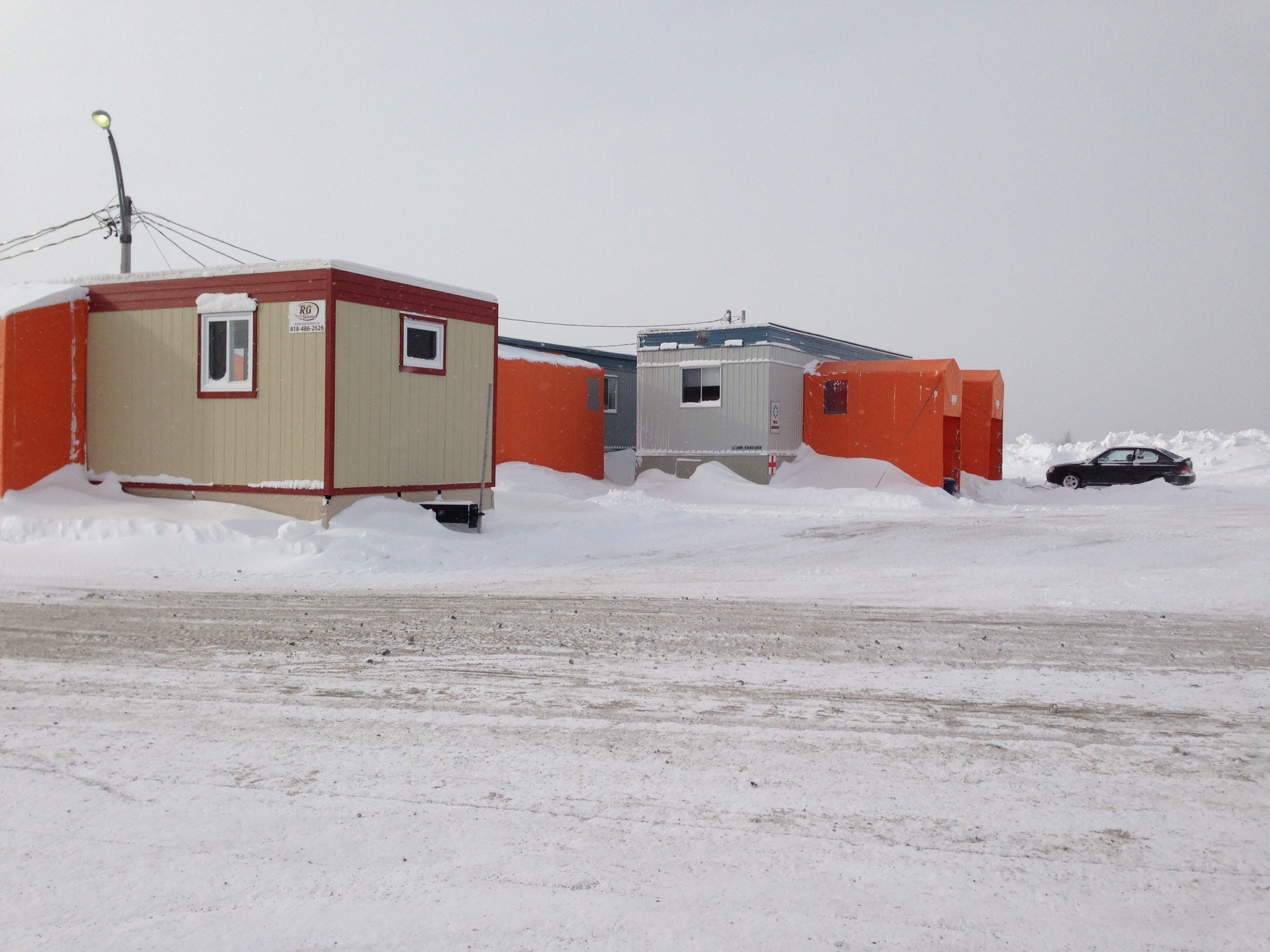
- Mining camp at Fire Lake

- Location within Quebec
- Location: Rivière-Mouchalagane, Quebec, Canada
- Coordinates: 52.336913°N 67.361417°W
- Basin countries: Canada
- Max. length: 2.6 kilometres (1.6 mi)
- Max. width: 800 metres (2,600 ft)

Fire Lake (French: Lac Fire) is a lake in the Côte-Nord region of Quebec, Canada. It was the location of a major open pit mining operation in the 1970s and 1980s. Operations were then suspended for twenty years, but ArcelorMittal resumed extraction in 2006.

== Location ==
Fire Lake is 2.6 kilometres (1.6 mi) long and 800 metres (2,600 ft) wide. It is about 400 kilometres (250 mi) north of Port-Cartier, Quebec, a port on the Gulf of Saint Lawrence. It is 85 kilometres (53 mi) southwest of Fermont. It is in the unorganized territory of Rivière-Mouchalagane in the Caniapiscau Regional County Municipality. The lake is just west of Quebec Route 389 and the Cartier Railway. Fire Lake was named by the Québec Cartier Mining Company in the 1950s, when the company was prospecting the lake shore.

The surrounding land is generally boggy. Lac Bergeron is to the north of Fire Lake, Lac Hope to the east, and Lac Hobdad to the west. The region is drained by the Petite rivière Manicouagan.

== Mining operation ==
The Québec Cartier Mining Company opened the Lake Jeannine iron mine to the southwest of Fire Lake in 1961, near the company-built town of Gagnon. The company made investments in the 1970s at Mont-Wright, Fermont and Fire Lake. The open pit mine near Fire Lake was exploited by Sidbec-Normines, a private-public consortium, between 1977 and 1984. Before the work began, in 1971–1977 facilities were built around the hamlet of Fire Lake, and a road was built that connected it to the town of Gagnon, 84 kilometres (52 mi) to the southwest.

In all 54 million tonnes of iron was extracted from Fire Lake, transported in the form of iron and silica pellets to the Port Cartier plant, then mostly shipped to Europe. The Lake Jeannine iron mine closed in 1976. The Fire Lake mine was closed in 1984. The mill at Lake Jeannine continued to treat iron ore from Fire Lake until 1985. The hamlet of Fire Lake and town of Gagnon were abandoned in 1985.

ArcelorMittal resumed mining at Fire Lake in 2006, with operations at first shutting down each winter. In 2012 year-round operations began. The ore is higher-quality than that of the Mont-Wright mine 55 kilometres (34 mi) to the north. The site at Fire Lake does not have a crusher or concentrator. Instead, the raw ore in shipped by train to Mont-Wright for processing, typically four times a day in convoys of about 60 wagons. After being crushed and concentrated, the ore is taken by train to Port-Cartier.

Fire Lake North, which adjoins the ArcelorMittal property to the north, is operated by Champion Iron. It is estimated to have a total of 3.4 billion tonnes of high quality ore. Fire Lake is one of four operational mines in the Fermont Iron Ore District, which between them account for all of Canada's iron ore production. In 2013 it was estimated that the district produced 47 million tonnes of iron ore concentrate. As of 2017 ArcelorMittal Mining Canada G.P. owned 85% of the Fire Lake mine, while the South Korean POSCO consortium and China Steel owned the remainder. The mine had 66 employees.

== Sources ==
- Consolidated Fire Lake North, Champion Iron
- Fire Lake, Commission de toponymie du Québec
- "Fire Lake Mine (ArcelorMittal)", MinesQG
- "Iron Ore Tailings – Quinto acquires Lac Jeannine material", Canadian Mining Journal, The Northern Miner Group, 14 February 2007
- Lac Fire, Natural Resources Canada
- Lac Jeannine (in French), Commission de toponymie du Québec
- "Lac Jeannine Rivière Mouchalagane", Mindat
- Mining sites (Mont-Wright and Fire Lake), ArcelorMittal
- Our History, ArcelorMittal
