= René Coicou =

Haitian-Canadian politician (1935–2020)

Mayor of Gagnon, Quebec
- In office 1973–1985

Personal details
- Born: May 30, 1935 Haiti
- Died: March 2, 2020 (aged 84) Ottawa, Ontario, Canada
- Occupation: Politician

René Coicou (30 May 1935 – 2 March 2020) was a Haitian-Canadian politician, who served as the last mayor of Gagnon, Quebec from 1973 to 1985, making him the first black mayor in Quebec.

== Biography ==
In 1957, Coicou fled Haiti during the regime of François Duvalier. He moved to Canada and settled in Montreal, Quebec, at the age of 22. He studied mechanics, and was hired by Québec Cartier Mining Company, leading him to Gagnon, a mining town in the Côte-Nord region. He soon became a highly respected member of the mining community, and, after advice from his friends, Coicou ran for mayor in 1973. He was elected, and reelected in the following two elections. However, after an economic collapse due to poor output from the mines, Coicou had to announce to the town's 2000 residents that Gagnon would officially be closed on 30 June 1985.
