= Jeannine Lake =

Jeannine Lake may refer to:

- Lake Jeannine, a small lake in Quebec, Canada that was the site of a major mining operation in the 1960s and 1970s
- Jeannine Lee Lake, candidate for the 2018 and 2020 United States House of Representatives elections in Indiana, District 6
