= Lake Arthur (Quebec) =

Lake in Lac-Walker, Quebec, Canada

- Lac Arthur (French)
- South of the Northeast Toulnustouc River basin. Lake Arthur to the east of the Cartier railway

- Location within Quebec
- Location: Sept-Rivières Regional County Municipality, Quebec
- Coordinates: 50.758341°N 67.531271°W
- References: EFJFB

Lake Arthur (French: Lac Arthur) is a lake in Quebec, in Port-Cartier–Sept-Îles Wildlife Reserve in the Côte-Nord region.

== Location ==
Lake Arthur is about 100 kilometres (62 mi) northwest of Port-Cartier, Quebec. It is in the unorganized territory of Lac-Walker, in the Sept-Rivières Regional County Municipality of the Côte-Nord administrative region, Quebec. It is just east of Grand lac Caotibi, into which it drains. This lake in turns drains to the north into Petit lac Caotibi, which feeds the Rivière Toulnustouc Nord-Est (North-East Toulnustouc River), a tributary of Lake Caron in the Toulnustouc River basin. The Cartier Railway runs between Lake Arthur and Grand lac Caotibi.

Lake Arthur has an area of about 11 square kilometres (4.2 sq mi). It is one of the attractions of Port-Cartier–Sept-Îles Wildlife Reserve. The lake is known for having many large brook trout.

== Name ==
Lake Arthur is named after Arthur A. Schmon (1895–1964) of Newark, New Jersey, a leading figure in the paper industry. It was given this name on 5 December 1968.

== Ecology ==
A map of the Ecological regions of Quebec places the lake in the 6J-S ecological subregion, part of the eastern spruce/moss domain of the boreal zone.

== Visiting ==
A campsite operated by the reserve is accessible from the road that runs along the south of the lake. There is no drinking water, but there are showers, cottage accommodation and boat rental. There are 29 camping sites. The reserve charges a daily fee for use of the site. On 19 December 2017 the Quebec government announced that a fifth Modik cottage was being built at Lake Arthur at a cost of $247,000. The wooden cottage would have capacity for four adults, and was designed for fishing enthusiasts. Most of the energy would be solar.

== Sources ==
- "Camping Lac-Arthur Réserve Faunique de Port-Cartier-Sept-îles", QuébecOriginal (in French)
- Lac Arthur (in French), Commission de toponymie du Québec
- Lac Arthur (in French), Ressources naturelles Canada
- Réserve faunique de Port‑Cartier–Sept‑Îles, Portrait, Sépaq
- Réserve faunique de Port-Cartier-Sept-Îles - Un nouveau chalet autour du Lac Arthur (in French), Services Québec
- Saucier, J.-P.; Robitaille, A.; Grondin, P.; Bergeron, J.-F.; Gosselin, J. (2011), Les régions écologiques du Québec méridional (PDF) (map), 4 (in French), Ministère des Ressources naturelles et de la Faune, archived from the original (PDF) on 2020-06-19
