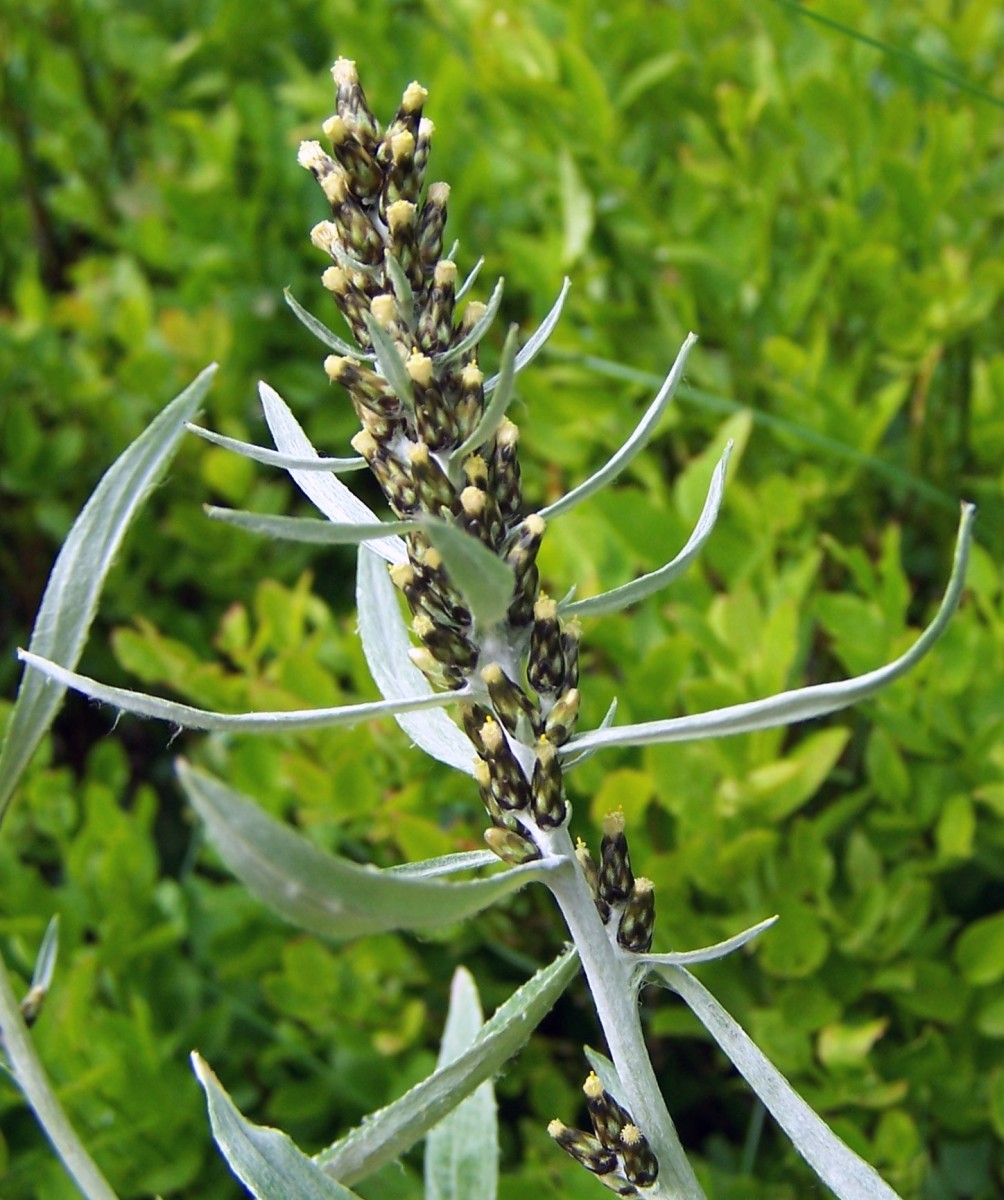

Scientific classification
- Kingdom: Plantae
- Clade: Tracheophytes
- Clade: Angiosperms
- Clade: Eudicots
- Clade: Asterids
- Order: Asterales
- Family: Asteraceae
- Genus: Omalotheca
- Species: O. norvegica

Binomial name
- Omalotheca norvegica (Gunnerus) F.W.Schultz & Sch.Bip.

Synonyms
- Gamochaeta norvegica (Gunnerus) Y.S.Chen & R.J.Bayer; Gnaphalium fuscatum Pers.; Gnaphalium fuscum Lam., nom. illeg.; Gnaphalium medium Vill.; Gnaphalium norvegicum Gunnerus; Gnaphalium sylvaticum subsp. fuscatum (Pers.) Čelak.; Gnaphalium sylvaticum subsp. norvegicum (Gunnerus) Bonnier & Layens; Synchaeta norvegica (Gunnerus) Kirp.

= Omalotheca norvegica =

Species of flowering plant

Omalotheca norvegica, synonym Gnaphalium norvegicum, is a European species of plants in the family Asteraceae. It is known as the highland cudweed or Norwegian arctic cudweed. It is native to eastern Canada and Greenland, and widespread across much of Eurasia from the Mediterranean north to Finland and Iceland and east to Siberia.

Omalotheca norvegica is similar to Omalotheca sylvatica, heath cudweed. However, it is 8 to 30 cm tall, the leaves are 3 veined, and all roughly equal in length. The leaves are also wooly/hairy on both sides.

In Great Britain, it is a rare plant found in central Scotland and in the northern highlands, found on acidic mountain rocks. It flowers July to August.
