= Jedway =

Coordinates: 52°18′00″N 131°13′00″W

Jedway is a landing and former settlement and mining camp on Harriet Harbour, part of Skincuttle Inlet, on the east coast of Moresby Island in Haida Gwaii, British Columbia, Canada. Jedway was once a hub for mines in the area during a mining boom on South Moresby, including mines at Ikeda and Lockeport, though a mine at the Jedway iron-magnetite deposit, known as the Jessie showings, did not open until 1961. In the earlier period, Jedway was the de facto capital of the archipelago, as it was the headquarters of the provincial Gold Commissioner, E. M. Sandilands, whose position carried with it all the functions of and powers of government. It lost this status when he relocated to Queen Charlotte City in 1910. A 1908 in The Ledge, a mining newspaper based in Greenwood, said "there is room for another hotel in Jedway". Jedway remained a local service centre after that, but the relocation of two Chinese men sentenced to months-long imprisonment to Jedway from Daajing Giids in 1912 suggests the presence of jail facilities there.

== Jedway Iron Mine ==
An open-pit mine, the Jedway mine operated until 1969, with the location being described as "more of a camp than a town" with a peak population of 258 in those years. The mine was operated by 'Jedway Iron Ore Company, a subsidiary of the Granby Mining Company Limited, with both companies holding a range of claims in the area. 3,938,702 tonnes of ore was milled, producing about 2.1 megatonnes of iron concentrate; export contracts for the ore were with Sumitumo Shoji Kaisha of Japan.

== Local geography ==
Jedway Bay, Jedway Point and Jedway Creek are all named for the settlement.
