= Hart Jaune River =

River in Quebec, Canada

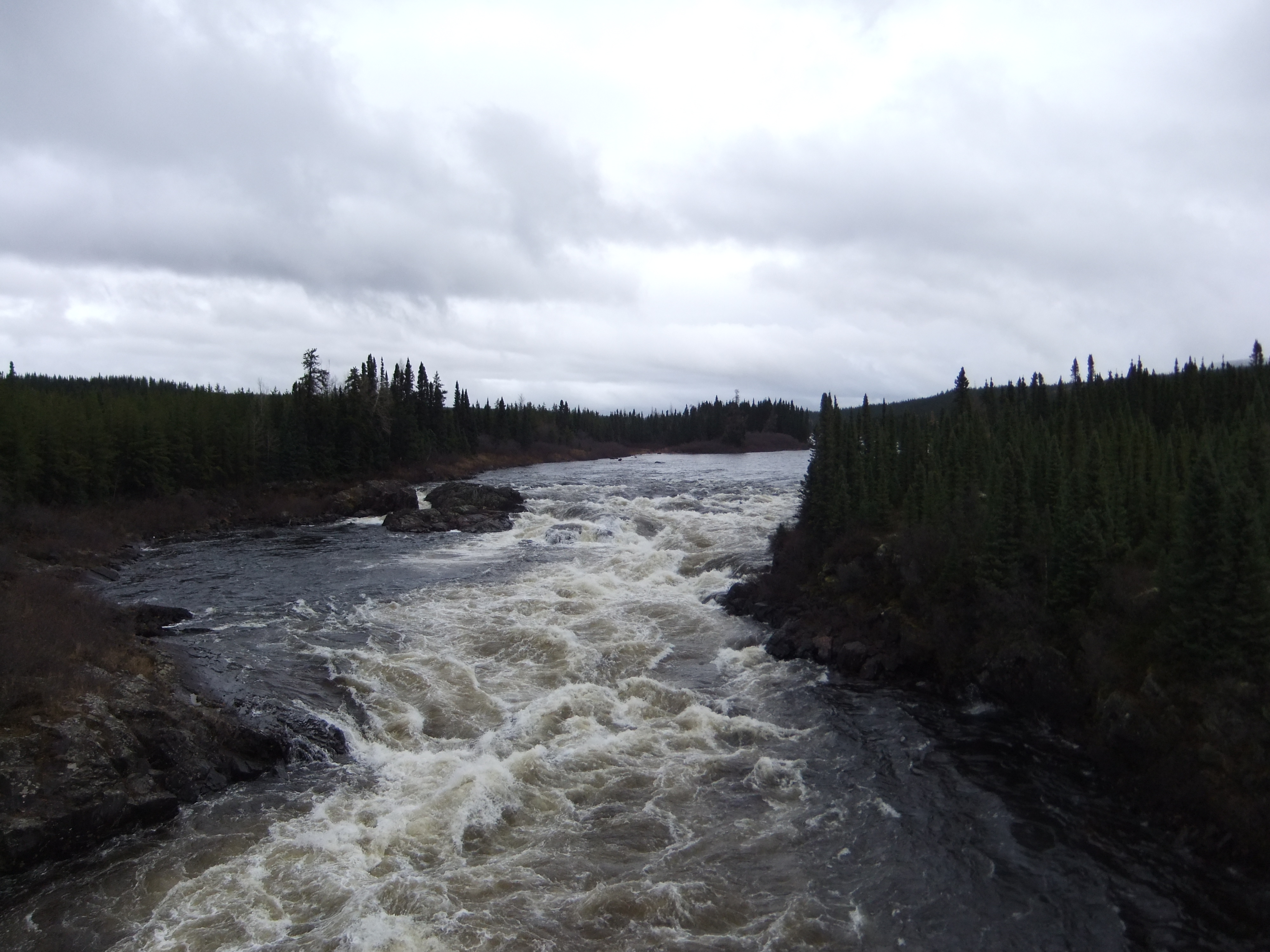
- Hart Jaune viewed from Quebec Route 389

- Location within Quebec
- Native name: Rivière Hart Jaune (French)

Location
- Country: Canada
- Province: Quebec

Physical characteristics
- Source
  - location: Petit lac Manicouagan
  - coordinates: 51.824092°N 67.804019°W
- Mouth
  - location: Manicouagan Reservoir
  - coordinates: 51.69115°N 68.178578°W

Basin features
- NRC Id: EGPXJ

The Hart Jaune River (French: Rivière Hart Jaune) is a river in Quebec, Canada. It flows from the Petit lac Manicouagan to the Manicouagan Reservoir.

== Location ==
The Hart Jaune River is in the unorganized territory of Rivière-Mouchalagane in the Caniapiscau Regional County Municipality. It forms the outlet of the Petit lac Manicouagan at the Hart-Jaune Dam, which feeds the 45.5 MW Hart-Jaune generating station. The river flows southwest to the Manicouagan Reservoir. It is about 45 kilometres (28 mi) long, and has a vertical drop of 234 metres (768 ft).

The sources of the water are in the Uapishka Biodiversity Reserve, which also feeds the Toulnustouc and Manicouagan rivers. The Hart Jaune is one of the major inlets to the Manicouagan Reservoir, along with the Mouchalagane, Seignelay, Themines and Petite Riviere Manicouagan. The reservoir is drained by the Manicouagan River.

Quebec Route 389 from Baie-Comeau to Labrador City crosses the river at Km 375 over a small wooden one-way bridge. In February 2017 the Quebec government asked for bids to replace the bridge, estimated to cost CDN$1−5 million. The new bridge was to be a concrete slab type bridge over steel girders.

== Name ==
The Innu name for the river is Uishauneu Shipu, meaning river where there are alders. The name "Hart" refers to a strip of a flexible wood such as alder, hazel or dogwood used for binding. "Hart jaune" may refer to the grey alder (Alnus incana), which provides a yellow dye. The name was approved in 1945 and appears on a 1962 map of Quebec. The river has also been called the Rivière La Ferté.

== Geology ==
The course of the river roughly corresponds to the Hart Jaune Shear Zone (HJSZ) as proposed by Hynes et al. (2000). Southeast extension occurred along the shear zone during the Rigolet Pulse 1010–980 Ma) of the Grenville orogeny. Hart Jaune granite and anorthosite have thrust from the northwest under the shear zone and the allochthonous Hart Jaune terrane of Pinwarian crust to the southeast.

== Sources ==
- Chelys (28 January 2013), "Frozen, Wintry View of Circular Manicouagan Reservoir, Canada", Earth Snapshot, archived from the original on 2020-10-30
- Consulter un avis : 6705-16-HE13 (in French), Quebec
- Consulter un avis : 6705-16-1103-AN1, Quebec
- Gagnon, Mathieu; Muma, Walter, "Quebec Hwy 389 - Baie Comeau to Labrador City", Trans-Labrador Highway
- Gouvernement du Québec (2009), Plan de conservation, réserve de biodiversité Uapishka (PDF) (in French), Québec, Ministère du Développement durable, de l’Environnement et des Parcs, Direction du patrimoine écologique et des parcs., p. 27
- Rivière Hart Jaune, Commission de toponymie du Québec
- Rivière Hart Jaune (in French), Ressources naturelles Canada
- Thomson, Stephanie (September 2009), Mapping crustal terrane boundaries in Manicouagan Quebec, of the Grenville Province (thesis), McMaster University
