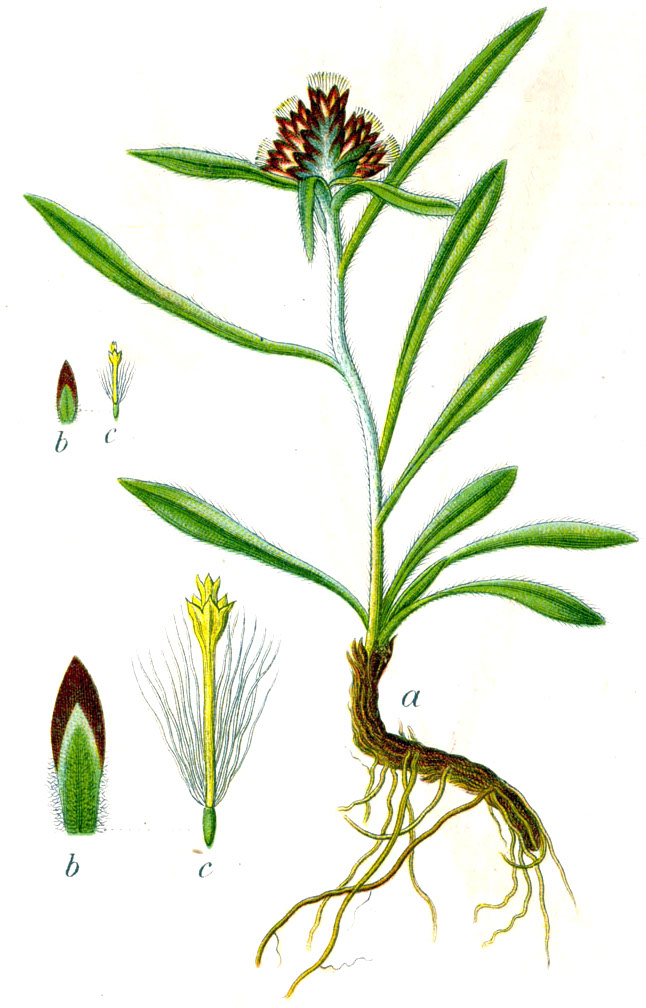
- Omalotheca supina

Scientific classification
- Kingdom: Plantae
- Clade: Tracheophytes
- Clade: Angiosperms
- Clade: Eudicots
- Clade: Asterids
- Order: Asterales
- Family: Asteraceae
- Subfamily: Asteroideae
- Tribe: Gnaphalieae
- Genus: Omalotheca; Cass.

Type species
- Omalotheca supina (L.) DC.

Synonyms
- Gnaphalium sect. Omalotheca (Cass.) Nutt.

= Omalotheca =

Genus of flowering plants

Omalotheca is a genus of flowering plants in the family Asteraceae. It is commonly known as arctic cudweed.

There is some disagreement about which species should be included in Omalotheca. Some or all of the species are sometimes included in Gnaphalium.

== Species ==
As of April 2023, Plants of the World Online accepted the following species:

- Omalotheca caucasica (Sommier & Levier) Czerep.
- Omalotheca diminuta (Braun-Blanq.) Bartolucci & Galasso
- Omalotheca hoppeana (W.D.J.Koch) F.W.Schultz & Sch.Bip.
- Omalotheca leucopilina (Schott & Kotschy ex Boiss.) Holub
- Omalotheca nanchuanensis (Y.Ling & Y.Q.Tseng) Holub
- Omalotheca norvegica (Gunnerus) F.W.Schultz & Sch.Bip.
- Omalotheca roeseri (Boiss. & Heldr.) Holub
- Omalotheca supina (L.) DC.
- Omalotheca sylvatica (L.) F.W.Schultz & Sch.Bip.
- Omalotheca × traunsteineri (Murr) Dostál
