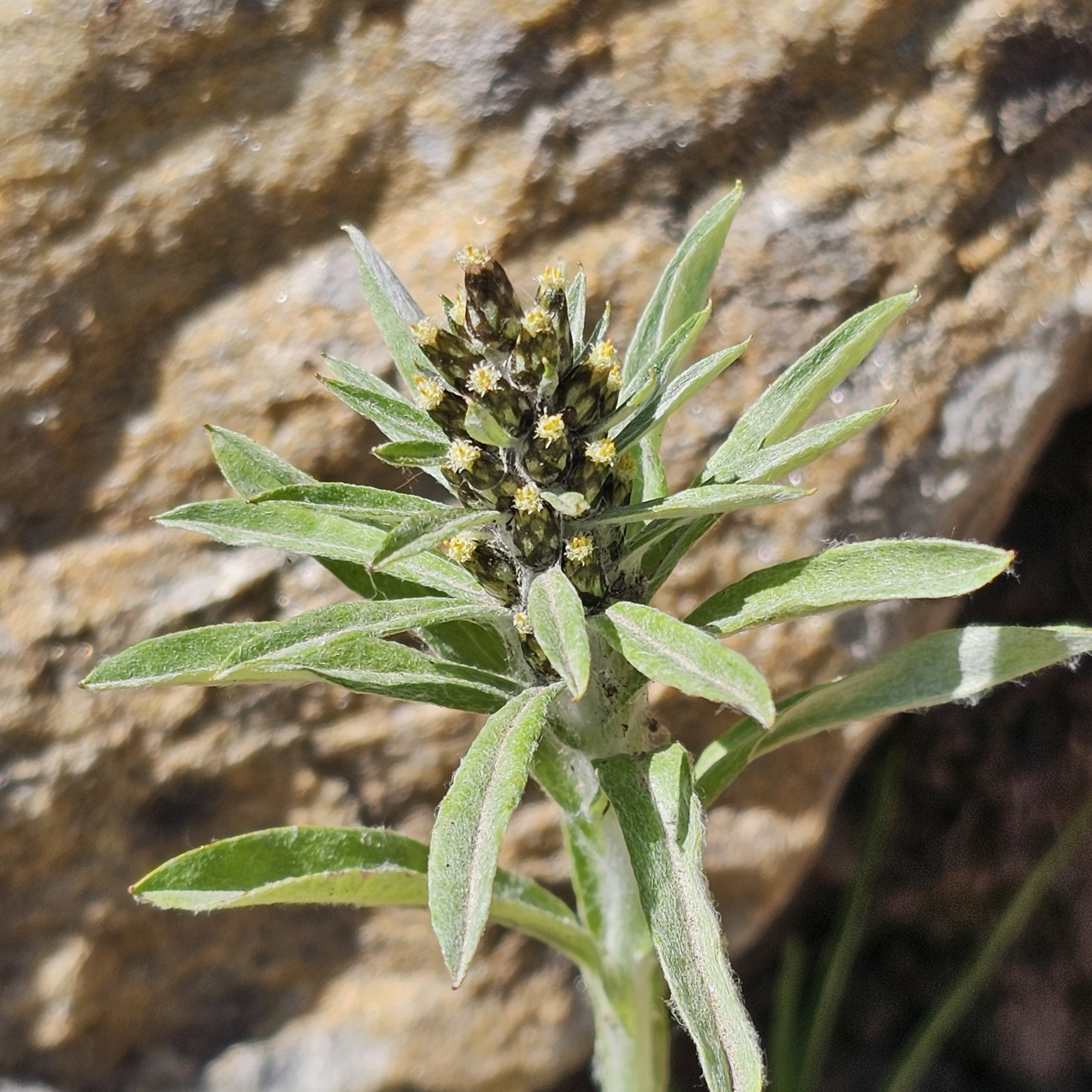

Scientific classification
- Kingdom: Plantae
- Clade: Tracheophytes
- Clade: Angiosperms
- Clade: Eudicots
- Clade: Asterids
- Order: Asterales
- Family: Asteraceae
- Genus: Omalotheca
- Species: O. caucasica

Binomial name
- Omalotheca caucasica (Sommier & Levier) Czerep.

Synonyms
- Gnaphalium caucasicum Sommier & Levier; Synchaeta caucasica (Sommier & Levier) Kirp.

= Omalotheca caucasica =

Species of plant

Omalotheca caucasica is a species of flowering plant in the family Asteraceae, native to Turkey and the Caucasus. It was first described in 1895 as Gnaphalium caucasicum.
