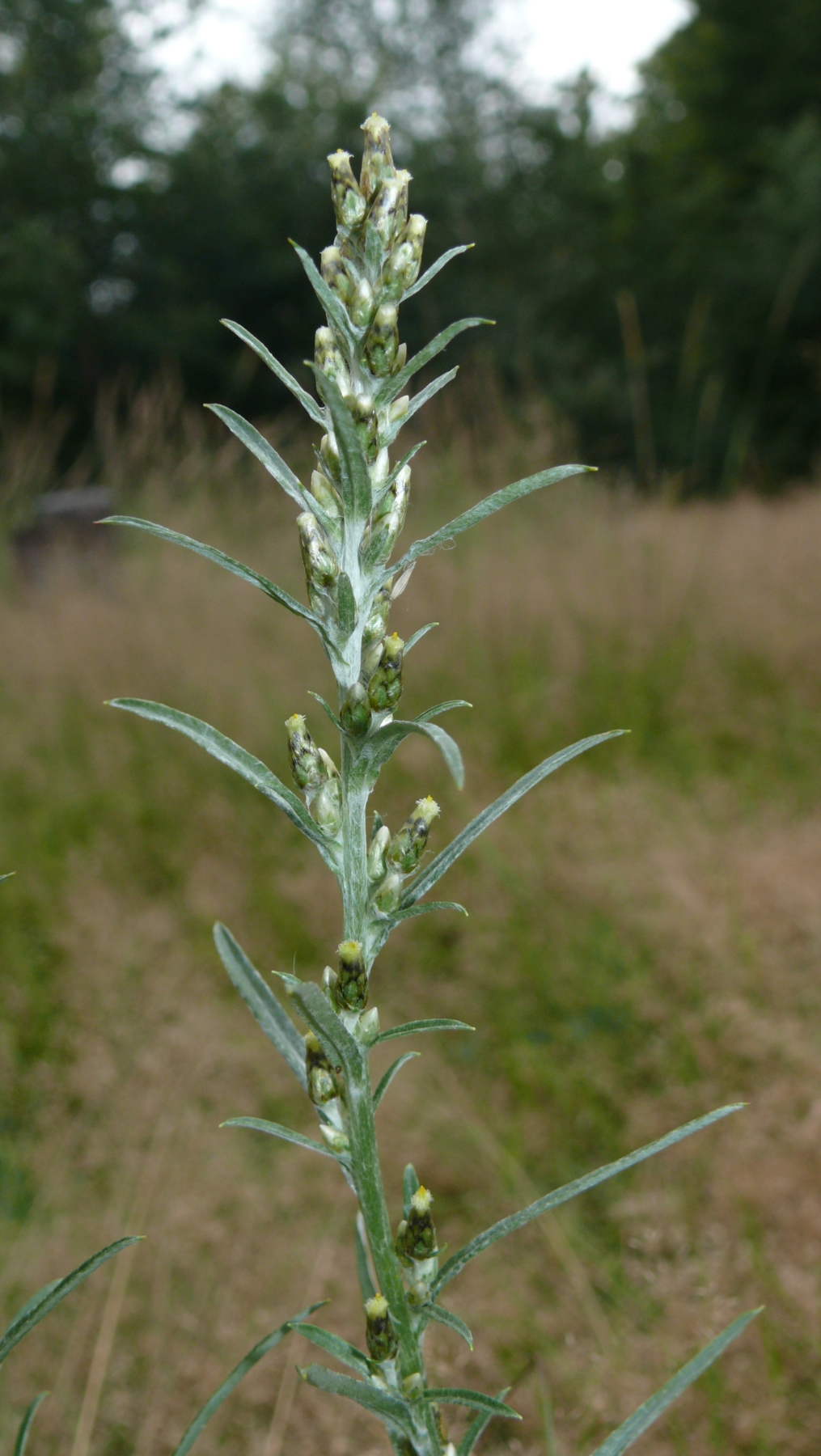

Scientific classification
- Kingdom: Plantae
- Clade: Embryophytes
- Clade: Tracheophytes
- Clade: Angiosperms
- Clade: Eudicots
- Clade: Asterids
- Order: Asterales
- Family: Asteraceae
- Genus: Omalotheca
- Species: O. sylvatica

Binomial name
- Omalotheca sylvatica (L.) F.W.Schultz & Sch.Bip.

Synonyms
- Synonymy: Dasyanthus fuscus Bubani, nom. superfl.; Dasyanthus sylvaticus (L.) Bubani; Filago recta (Sm.) Link; Filago sylvatica (L.) Link; Gamochaeta sylvatica (L.) Fourr.; Gnaphalium alpigenum K.Koch; Gnaphalium carpetanum Boiss. & Reut. ex Willk. & Lange; Gnaphalium einseleanum F.W.Schultz; Gnaphalium fuscatum Schur, nom. illeg.; Gnaphalium mutabile Rochel; Gnaphalium rectum Sm.; Gnaphalium sophiae Heldr. ex Boiss.; Gnaphalium spadiceum Gilib., opus utique oppr.; Gnaphalium sylvaticum L.; Gnaphalium sylvaticum subsp. rectum (Sm.) Čelak.; Gnaphalium sylvaticum subvar. pumilum Gaudin; Gnaphalium sylvaticum var. acaule Behm; Gnaphalium sylvaticum var. alpestre Brügger; Gnaphalium sylvaticum var. angustifolium Gaudin; Gnaphalium sylvaticum var. atriceps Briq. & Cavill.; Gnaphalium sylvaticum var. carpetanum Boiss. & Reut. ex Willk.; Gnaphalium sylvaticum var. citrinum Gaudin; Gnaphalium sylvaticum var. latifolium Gaudin; Gnaphalium sylvaticum var. minus Godet; Gnaphalium sylvaticum var. montanum Neilr.; Gnaphalium sylvaticum var. nanum Duby ex St.-Lag.; Gnaphalium sylvaticum var. nigrescens Gren.; Gnaphalium sylvaticum var. pallidum Schur; Gnaphalium sylvaticum var. pediophilum Wimm. & Grab.; Gnaphalium sylvaticum var. praecox F.W.Schultz; Gnaphalium sylvaticum var. rectum (Sm.) Gaudin; Gnaphalium sylvaticum var. sericeum Spenn.; Gnaphalium sylvaticum var. subarcticum Schur; Helichrysum strictum Moench; Omalotheca einseleana (F.W.Schultz) F.W.Schultz; Omalotheca sylvatica subsp. carpetana (Boiss. & Reut. ex Willk.) Rivas Mart.; Omalotheca sylvatica var. carpetana (Boiss. & Reut. ex Willk.) T.Romero Martín & E.Rico; Synchaeta silvatica (L.) Kirp.

= Omalotheca sylvatica =

Species of flowering plant

Omalotheca sylvatica, synonyms including Gnaphalium sylvaticum, is a species of plant in the family Asteraceae. It is commonly known as heath cudweed, wood cudweed, golden motherwort, chafeweed, owl's crown, and woodland arctic cudweed. It is widespread across the temperate Northern Hemisphere, throughout North America and Eurasia. The species was first formally described by Carl Linnaeus in 1753 as Gnaphalium sylvaticum.

== Description ==
It is a perennial herb with short runners, growing to 8 to 60 cm tall. Its leaves are lanceolate in shape, pointed, 2 to 8 cm long, with a single vein. They have no hair on top, but are woolly hairy below. The upper leaves become progressively shorter and narrower. The flower heads are 6 mm long. The bracts of the flower heads have a green centre, and chaffy brown edges. The florets are pale brown. The achenes are hairy with reddish pappus hairs. It flowers from July until September.
