= Lockeport, British Columbia =

Locality in British Columbia, Canada

Coordinates: 52°43′00″N 131°50′00″W

Lockeport is a locality on Moresby Island in the Haida Gwaii archipelago of the North Coast of British Columbia, Canada, located on Klunkwoi Bay.

== See also ==
- Lockeport, Nova Scotia
