= Fermont =

- City
- Ville de Fermont
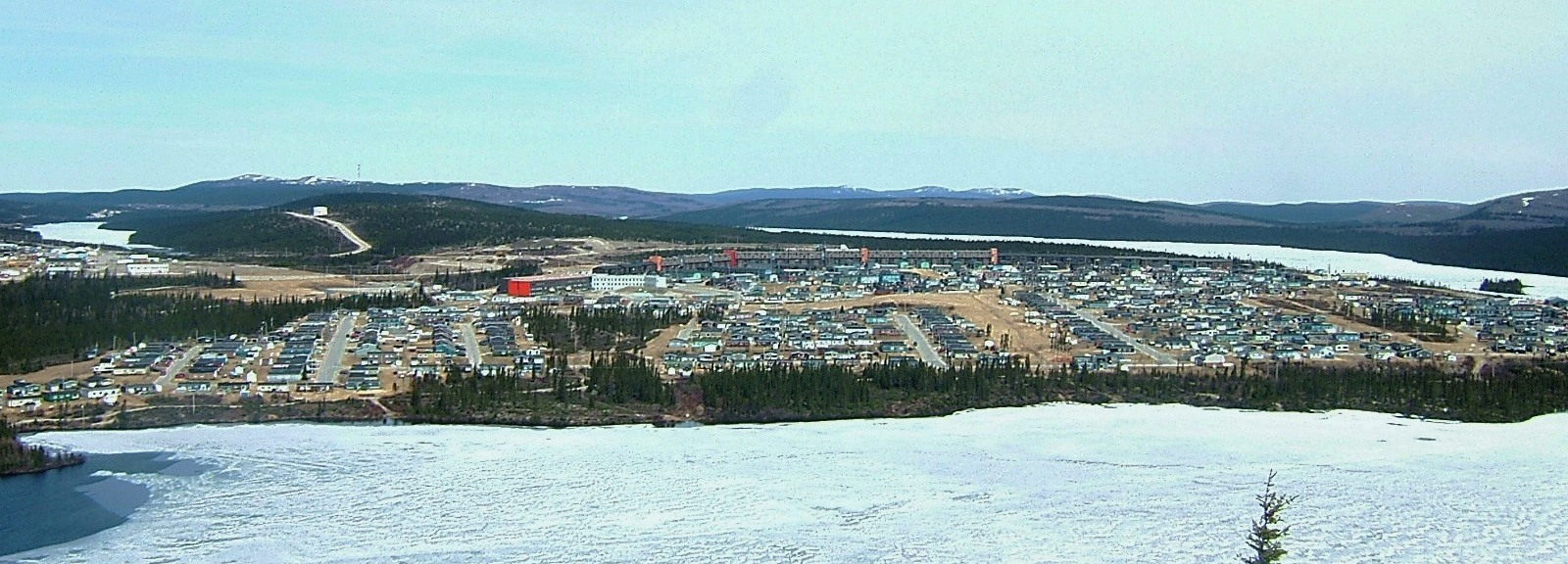

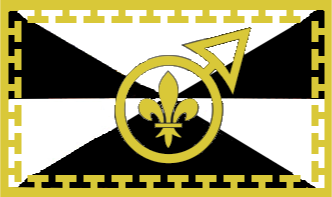
- Flag Coat of arms
- Motto(s): Faire front, faire face
- Location in Côte-Nord Region of Quebec
- Coordinates: 52°47′N 67°05′W
- Country: Canada
- Province: Quebec
- Region: Côte-Nord
- RCM: Caniapiscau
- Settled: 1971
- Constituted: October 15, 1974

Government
  - Mayor: Martin St-Laurent
  - Federal riding: Côte-Nord—Kawawachikamach—Nitassinan
  - Prov. riding: Duplessis

Area
  - Total: 503.06 km^{2} (194.23 sq mi)
  - Land: 451.12 km^{2} (174.18 sq mi)
  - Urban: 1.45 km^{2} (0.56 sq mi)
- Elevation: 610 m (2,000 ft)

Population (2021)
  - Total: 2,256
  - Density: 5/km^{2} (13/sq mi)
  - Urban: 2,151
  - Urban density: 1,484/km^{2} (3,840/sq mi)
  - Pop (2016-21): ▼8.8%
  - Dwellings: 1,538
- Time zone: UTC−5 (EST)
  - Summer (DST): UTC−4 (EDT)
- Postal code(s): G0G 1J0
- Area codes: 418 and 581
- Highways: R-389
- Website: www.villedefermont.qc.ca

Fermont (/ˈfɛərmɒnt/; French pronunciation: [fɛʁmɔ̃]) is a mining city in Côte-Nord region, Quebec, Canada, near the Quebec-Labrador border about 23 kilometres (14 mi) from Labrador City on Route 389, which connects to the Trans-Labrador Highway (Newfoundland and Labrador Route 500). It is the seat of the Regional County Municipality of Caniapiscau.

The city is located about 565 km (351 mi) from Baie-Comeau, about 867 km (539 mi) from Saguenay, and about 1,000 km (621 mi) from Quebec City.

Fermont (French contraction of "Fer Mont", meaning "Iron Mountain") was founded as a company town in the early 1970s to exploit rich iron ore deposits from Mont Wright, which is about 25 kilometres (16 mi) to the west.

The town is notable for the huge self-contained structure containing apartments, stores, schools, bars, a hotel, restaurants, a supermarket and swimming pool; the large building shelters a community of smaller apartment buildings and homes on its leeward side. Popularly known as The Wall (Le Mur), the structure was designed to be a windscreen to the rest of the town. It permits residents (other than mine workers) to never leave the building during the long winter, which usually lasts about seven months. The town, designed by Maurice Desnoyers and Norbert Schoenauer, was inspired by similar projects in Sweden designed by Ralph Erskine, notably that of Svappavaara, an iron mining town in Sweden. The building measures 1.3 kilometres (4,300 ft) long and stands 15 metres (49 ft) high.

== History ==
Following the depletion of the Jeannine Lake Mine at Gagnon in the late 1960s, the Québec Cartier Mining Company began to develop the Mont Wright Mine. This was a large-scale project that involved mining, processing, and transporting iron ore. Some 1,600 employees would be needed, and the town of Fermont was constructed to house them and their families. By the end of 1972, the first people settled there. The same year, the Fermont post office opened, and in 1974, the place was incorporated as Ville de Fermont. The town, mine and wall were featured in the television crime drama series La Faille (2019).

== Geography ==
Fermont is settled about 30 km (18 mi) from Labrador City, about 565 km (351 mi) from Baie-Comeau, and about 550 km (341 mi) from Happy Valley-Goose Bay. Fermont is in an area of rounded hills and flat areas with peat bogs, wetlands and many lakes and small streams. The valleys show the influence of glacial action and contain undifferentiated glacial till and fluvioglacial deposits of sand and gravel. Lake Perchard, to the north of Fermont, supplies the town with drinking water. The Fermont waste water treatment plant discharges through lakes Daviault and Sans-Nom into Carheil Lake, in the Moisie River watershed. In April 2011 it was reported that water management experts in Sept-Îles were concerned about cyanobacteria, or blue-green algae, that had been found in Carheil Lake and had potential to further affect the Moisie River. The bloom was due to phosphorus discharge from the treatment plant, which has since been reduced.

=== Climate ===
Fermont has a harsh subarctic climate (Köppen Dfc) with long, severe winters and short, mild summers. Although overall not as heavy as in most other parts of the Labrador Peninsula, snowfall is still heavy at around 2.9 metres (114.2 in) and average maximum depth of 85 centimetres (33.46 in) which is actually deeper than some other North Shore locations with heavier snowfall like Sept-Îles.

Climate data for Fermont, Quebec (1981-2010): altitude 595 metres or 1,952 feet
Month	Jan	Feb	Mar	Apr	May	Jun	Jul	Aug	Sep	Oct	Nov	Dec	Year
Record high °C (°F)	6.5 (43.7)	6.5 (43.7)	12.5 (54.5)	17.5 (63.5)	26.0 (78.8)	36.5 (97.7)	31.0 (87.8)	34.0 (93.2)	26.0 (78.8)	16.0 (60.8)	12.0 (53.6)	3.0 (37.4)	36.5 (97.7)
Mean daily maximum °C (°F)	−16.0 (3.2)	−13.0 (8.6)	−6.7 (19.9)	2.5 (36.5)	9.7 (49.5)	16.6 (61.9)	19.6 (67.3)	18.2 (64.8)	12.0 (53.6)	3.8 (38.8)	−3.6 (25.5)	−11.6 (11.1)	2.6 (36.7)
Daily mean °C (°F)	−22.1 (−7.8)	−19.8 (−3.6)	−13.3 (8.1)	−3.5 (25.7)	3.6 (38.5)	10.1 (50.2)	13.5 (56.3)	12.6 (54.7)	7.2 (45.0)	0.1 (32.2)	−7.8 (18.0)	−16.9 (1.6)	−3.0 (26.6)
Mean daily minimum °C (°F)	−28.1 (−18.6)	−26.6 (−15.9)	−19.5 (−3.1)	−9.7 (14.5)	−2.3 (27.9)	3.8 (38.8)	7.4 (45.3)	7.0 (44.6)	2.4 (36.3)	−3.7 (25.3)	−12.2 (10.0)	−22.3 (−8.1)	−8.6 (16.4)
Record low °C (°F)	−49.0 (−56.2)	−49.5 (−57.1)	−46.0 (−50.8)	−31.0 (−23.8)	−17.5 (0.5)	−8.0 (17.6)	−5.0 (23.0)	−5.0 (23.0)	−15.0 (5.0)	−18.0 (−0.4)	−35.0 (−31.0)	−45.0 (−49.0)	−49.5 (−57.1)
Average precipitation mm (inches)	51.2 (2.02)	31.4 (1.24)	42.8 (1.69)	40.5 (1.59)	46.6 (1.83)	87.7 (3.45)	118.7 (4.67)	103.7 (4.08)	106.0 (4.17)	67.2 (2.65)	58.6 (2.31)	52.2 (2.06)	806.5 (31.75)
Average rainfall mm (inches)	1.1 (0.04)	0.5 (0.02)	0.9 (0.04)	13.8 (0.54)	35.3 (1.39)	86.6 (3.41)	118.7 (4.67)	103.7 (4.08)	102.9 (4.05)	43.3 (1.70)	6.8 (0.27)	1.5 (0.06)	515.1 (20.27)
Average snowfall cm (inches)	50.1 (19.7)	30.9 (12.2)	42.0 (16.5)	26.7 (10.5)	11.3 (4.4)	1.2 (0.5)	0.0 (0.0)	0.0 (0.0)	3.0 (1.2)	23.9 (9.4)	51.8 (20.4)	50.7 (20.0)	291.6 (114.8)
Average precipitation days (≥ 0.2 mm)	12.0	9.9	10.5	9.8	11.7	16.4	18.2	17.0	20.0	15.5	14.1	12.8	167.9
Average rainy days (≥ 0.2 mm)	0.1	0.1	0.4	2.7	8.7	15.9	18.2	17.0	19.0	8.8	1.5	0.1	92.4
Average snowy days (≥ 0.2 cm)	11.9	9.9	10.3	7.5	4.3	0.8	0.0	0.0	1.6	8.0	13.3	12.8	80.4
Source 1: Ministère de l’Environnement
Source 2: Environment Canada (1971-2000 extremes & precip/snow)

== Demographics ==
In the 2021 Census of Population conducted by Statistics Canada, Fermont had a population of 2,256 living in 976 of its 1,538 total private dwellings, a change of −8.8% from its 2016 population of 2,474. With a land area of 451.12 km^{2} (174.18 sq mi), it had a population density of 5.0/km^{2} (13.0/sq mi) in 2021.

Canada census – Fermont community profile

	2021	2016	2011
Population	2,256 (-8.8% from 2016)	2,474 (-13.9% from 2011)	2,874 (+9.2% from 2006)
Land area	451.12 km^{2} (174.18 sq mi)	476.89 km^{2} (184.13 sq mi)	470.67 km^{2} (181.73 sq mi)
Population density	5.0/km^{2} (13/sq mi)	5.2/km^{2} (13/sq mi)	6.1/km^{2} (16/sq mi)
Median age	34.0 (M: 34.8, F: 32.8)	35.0 (M: 35.6, F: 34.3)	34.7 (M: 35.5, F: 33.2)
Private dwellings	1,538 (total) 976 (occupied)	1,638 (total)	1,221 (total)
Median household income	$172,000	$146,560	$113,774

References: 2021 2016 2011

Historical Census Data - Fermont, Quebec

Year	Pop.	±%
1976	3,479	—
1981	4,216	+21.2%
1986	3,592	−14.8%
1991	3,735	+4.0%
1996	3,234	−13.4%

Year	Pop.	±%
2001	2,918	−9.8%
2006	2,633	−9.8%
2011	2,874	+9.2%
2016	2,474	−13.9%
2021	2,256	−8.8%

Source: Statistics Canada

=== Languages ===
Canada Census Mother Tongue - Fermont, Quebec
Census	Total	French			English			French & English			Other		
Year	Responses	Count	Trend	Pop %	Count	Trend	Pop %	Count	Trend	Pop %	Count	Trend	Pop %
2016	2,475	2,410	▼13.9%	97.37%	30	▼25.0%	1.21%	15	▲50.0%	0.61%	20	0.0%	0.81%
2011	2,870	2,800	▲9.8%	97.56%	40	▼33.3%	1.39%	10	0.0%	0.35%	20	0.0%	0.70%
2006	2,640	2,550	▼10.1%	96.59%	60	▲20.0%	2.27%	10	0.0%	0.38%	20	0.0%	0.76%
2001	2,915	2,835	▼7.8%	97.26%	50	▼28.6%	1.72%	10	▼33.3%	0.34%	20	▼50.0%	0.69%
1996	3,200	3,075	n/a	98.75%	70	n/a	0.69%	15	n/a	0.33%	40	n/a	0.23%

== Economy ==
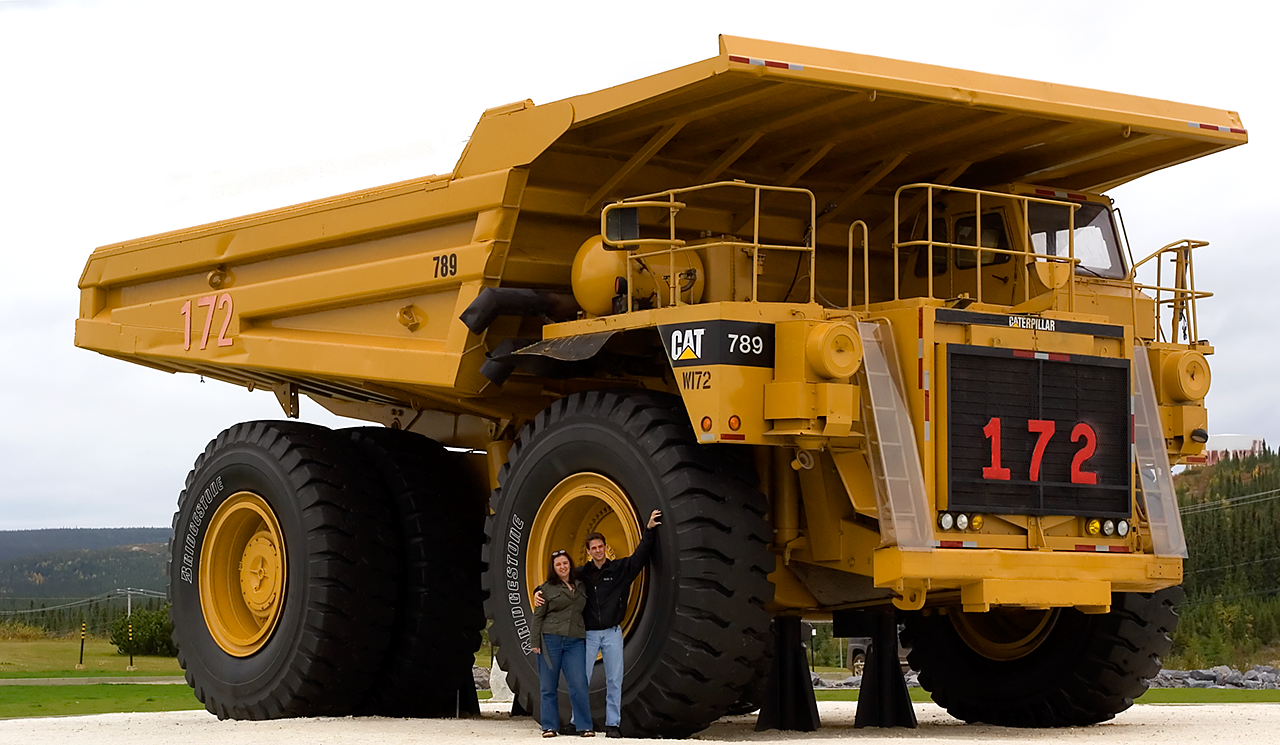
Truck 172 from the Mont-Wright Mine, on display in Fermont

The local economy is entirely dependent on the Mont Wright and Fire Lake mines owned by ArcelorMittal. Over 80% of municipal revenues come from mining operations.

Average earnings for full-time workers was $63,982 in 2001, compared to $39,217 in Quebec as a whole. This went up to $70,102 in 2006, whereas the provincial average dropped to $37,722.

The mine product is shipped to Port-Cartier on the Cartier Railway where it is converted to pellets. In 2006, the mine was affected by a labour dispute which lasted from early April to early June. It was amicably resolved with a six-year contract renewal.

Because of the town's disproportionately high number of (relatively prosperous) men compared to women and the few entertainment options in Fermont's climate, the adult entertainment industry is extremely lucrative in Fermont; as such, strippers can make a substantial amount of money for their profession.

== Local government ==
The city council is composed of a mayor and six city councillors. As of October 2020, the mayor is Martin St-Laurent. The councillors are Bernard Dupont, Danny Bouchard, Cindy Vignola, Marco Ouellet, Daniel Bergeron, and Shannon Power.

List of former mayors:

- Robin Bélanger (...–2003)
- Lise Pelletier (2003–2013)
- Martin St-Laurent (2014–present)

== Transportation ==
The Trans-Quebec–Labrador Route (route 389 on the Quebec side and route 500 on the Labrador side) is the only road access to Fermont. Route 389 begins in Baie-Comeau and goes north along the Manicouagan Reservoir.

The town is accessible by scheduled passenger airline service via the Wabush Airport; it is located in Labrador West.

The Cartier Railway connects Port-Cartier to the Mont-Wright min. However, it is only used for transporting iron ore concentrate and bulk equipment. The train no longer carries passengers.

== See also ==
- List of towns in Quebec

== Sources ==
- La santé du lac Carheil inquiète les spécialistes (in French), Radio-Canada, 29 April 2011, archived from the original on 2019-09-22
- Luce, Myriam; Ibrahim, Ghassen; Bourdon, Philippe (November 2011), Cyanobactéries aux lacs Davioult, Sans Nom et Carheil (PDF) (Étude partielle) (in French), OBV Duplessis, archived (PDF) from the original on 2021-10-10
- Portrait diagnostique de la problématique des cyanobactéries - bassin versant du lac Carheil (PDF) (in French), OBV Duplessis, April 2015, archived (PDF) from the original on 2021-10-10
