= Monts Groulx =

- Location within Quebec Location within Canada

Highest point
- Peak: Mount Veyrier
- Elevation: 1,104 m (3,622 ft)
- Coordinates: 51°37′15″N 67°37′03″W

Geography
- Country: Canada
- Province: Quebec

The Monts Groulx (Groulx Mountains) are a range of tall hills in the geographic centre of Quebec, Canada, just east of the Manicouagan Reservoir. Their tallest peak is Mount Veyrier, at 1,104 metres (3,622 ft).
