= Québec Cartier Mining Company =

- Company type: Incentive
- Industry: Mining
- Founded: 1958; 68 years ago
- Defunct: 2007
- Fate: Acquired by ArcelorMittal
- Headquarters: Quebec, Canada
- Products: Iron Ore

Québec Cartier Mining Company (French: La Compagnie minière Québec Cartier) was one of the leading producers of iron ore products in North America, now part of ArcelorMittal.

== History ==
The company was founded in the late 1950s by multiple Canadian and American investors, based in Quebec, Canada, led by president, Lloyd John Severson. The first open pit mine was located in Lac-Jeanine, Quebec. The Hart-Jaune Dam over the nearby Hart Jaune River supplied power. The company then built the town of Gagnon, in 1963 to accommodate workers and families. Eighteen years later, the company extended its operations seventy miles north to Fire Lake. In 1973, they started operating in Mont Wright, Quebec, where they created the town of Fermont.

At their Mont Wright plant, the company operates an open pit mine and a crusher/concentrator facility capable of producing eighteen million metric tonnes of iron ore concentrates annually. The company also operates a pellet plant with an annual production capacity of some nine million metric tonnes of iron ore pellets at Port-Cartier.

The falling market forced Québec Cartier to shut down its Fire Lake and Lac Jeannine plants in the mid 80's. The town of Gagnon was closed and its population moved to Fermont and Port-Cartier.

Nearly insolvent in 2002 due to falling price of iron ore and increasing price of production, Québec Cartier's financial situation has since improved.

Québec Cartier also owned Cartier Railway, one of the biggest private railways in Canada. Iron ore is sent from Fermont to Port-Cartier by train on a 400 kilometres (250 mi) railway. The company owns about fifteen locomotives and about 500 open-deck cars.

== New ownership ==
In 2007, Dofasco, the major shareholder of Québec Cartier, was bought by ArcelorMittal. This made Québec Cartier one of the leading mining facilities of the world biggest steel producer.

On May 29, 2008, Francois Pelletier, president of Québec Cartier had a speech in front of his employees and press in Port-Cartier and Fermont to announce the renaming of Québec Cartier to Arcelor Mittal Mines of Canada. Pelletier said in his speech: "After 51 years of existence, Québec Cartier, proud of its heritage, now look at the future under its new name, with its new family with optimism."
