= Quebec Route 389 =

Highway in Quebec

Coordinates: 49.7594°N 68.7095°W

Route 389

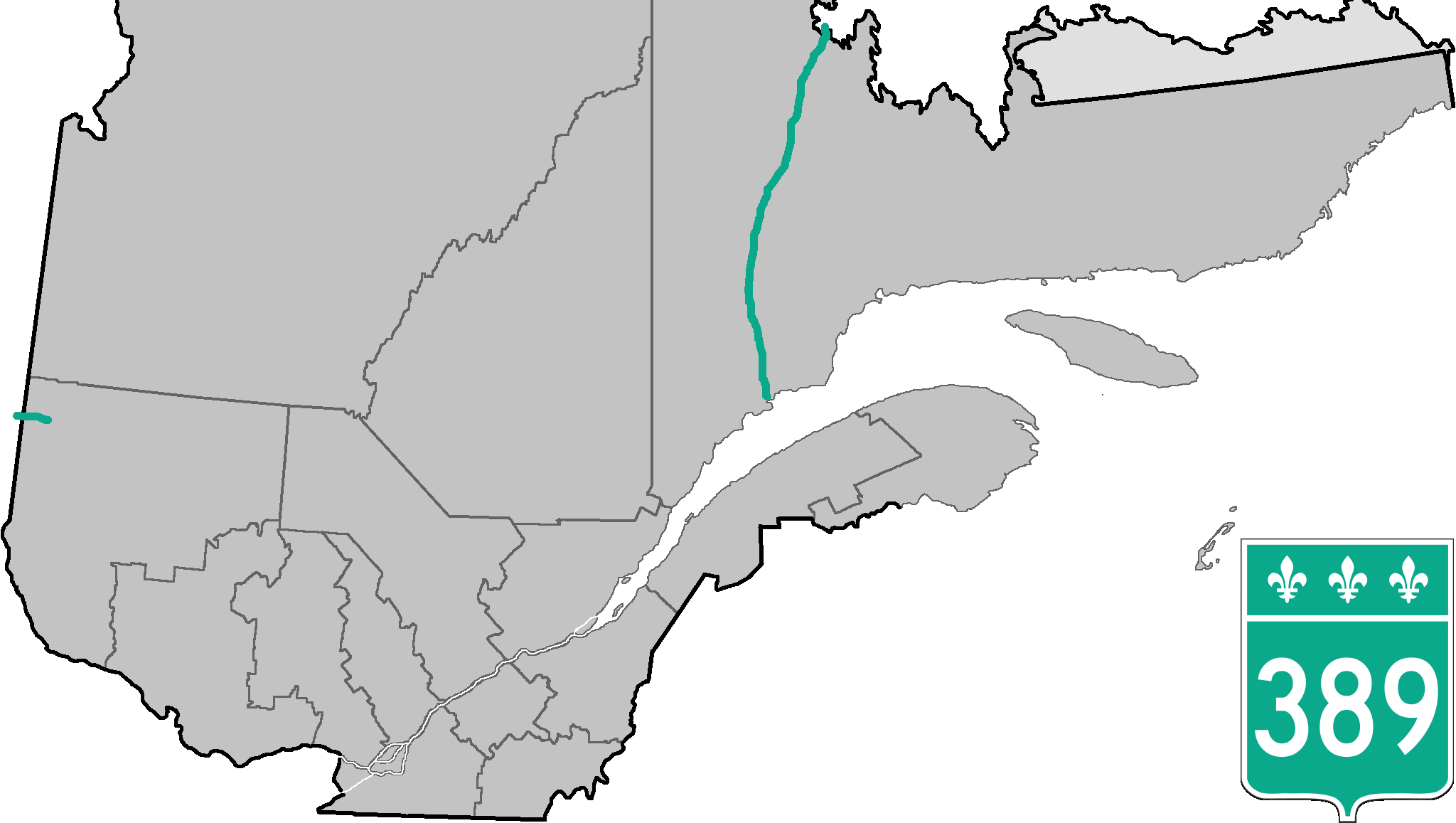

Route information
- Maintained by Transports Québec
- Length: 567 km (352 mi)

Major junctions
- South end: R-138 in Baie-Comeau
- North end: Route 500 north of Fermont

Location
- Country: Canada
- Province: Quebec
- Major cities: Baie-Comeau, Fermont

Highway system
- Quebec provincial highways; Autoroutes; List; Former
← R-388	→ R-390

Quebec's Route 389 connects Route 138 adjacent to Baie-Comeau with the Newfoundland and Labrador border, connecting with the Trans-Labrador Highway (Newfoundland and Labrador provincial route 500) to Wabush and Labrador City, and beyond to Goose Bay. On its way it skirts the eastern shore of Manicouagan Reservoir. The road is the only land connection from Labrador to the rest of North America. It is part of Canada's National Highway System.

== Route description ==
The Québec North Shore Company and Hydro-Québec completed portions from Route 389 to the Manic 5 hydroelectric project site (km 213), now known as the Daniel-Johnson Dam.

From km 213, the highway follows a path traditionally used by aboriginal people and explorers, with access to the Hart Jaune Hydroelectric Complex at km 390. The town of Gagnon, now torn down, was at km 394.

From km 317 (gas station and restaurant), the highway is now paved all the way to km 495.

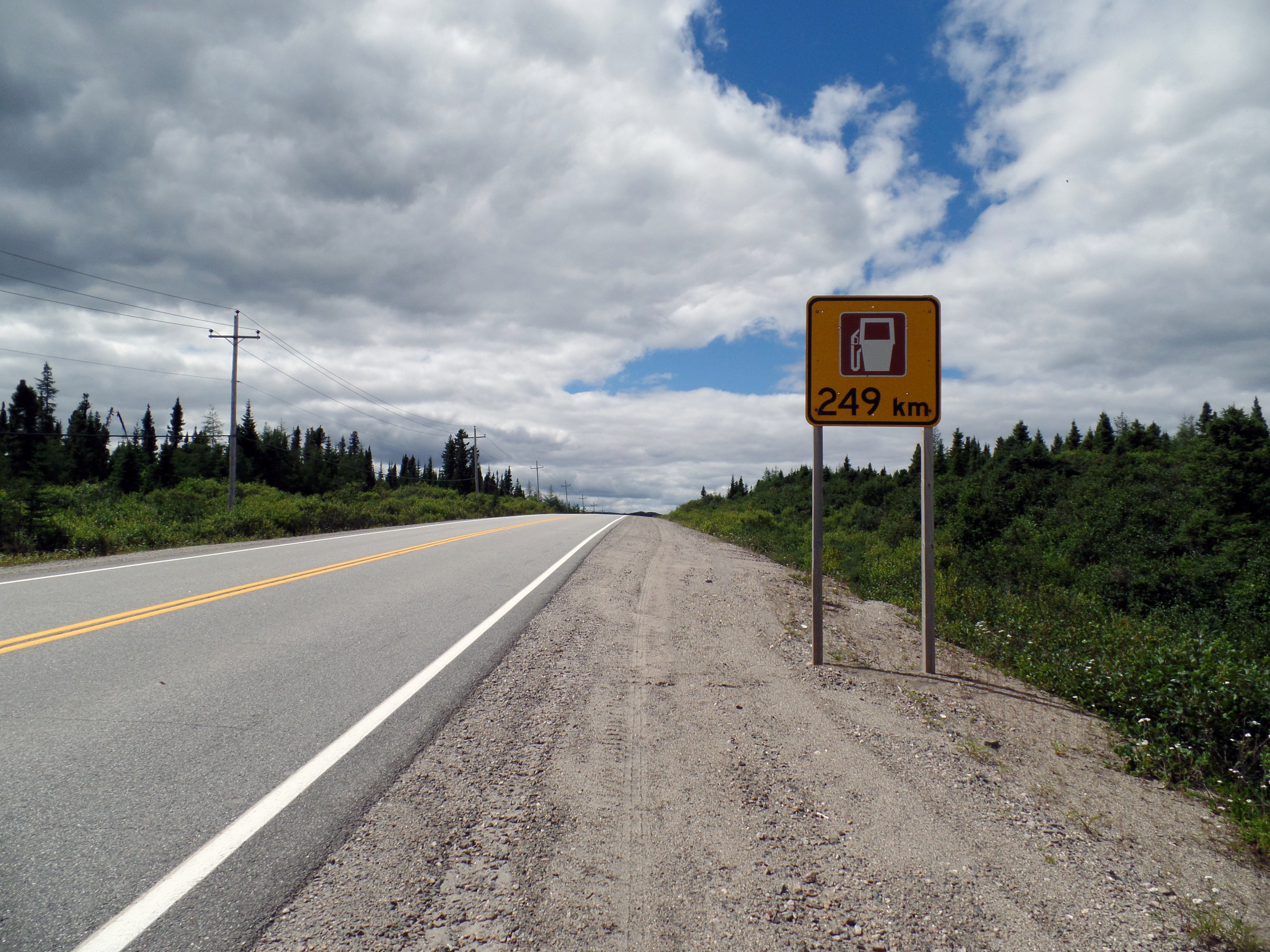
Route 389 southbound between Mont Wright and Fermont.

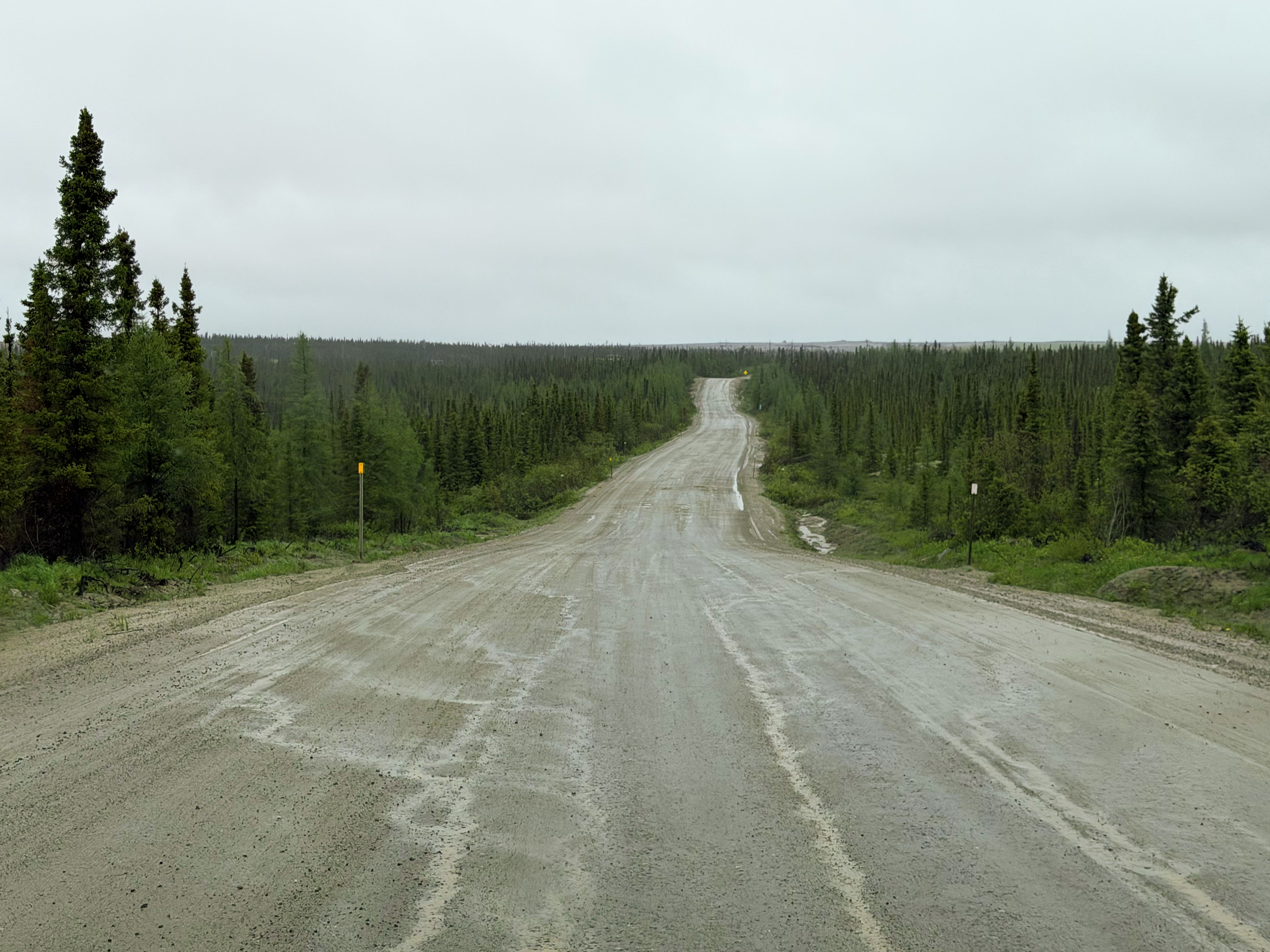
Gravel section of Route 389 northbound near Mont Wright.

Starting at km 495, the "Fire Lake Mine Road" section was built by unemployed workers during a labour dispute, influenced by the presence of the railway owned by the Québec Cartier Mining Company. This section of unpaved road is notoriously known as "the trail."

From km 495 to the provincial border at km 567 (352 miles from Baie-Comeau), the road is an accident-prone section notorious for its poor surface and sharp curves.

On April 9, 2009, the Quebec government announced that $438 million would be spent for work to improve the highway from the south end as far as Fermont, with major upgrading and repair work. This will include a significant reroute in the Fire Lake-Mont-Wright section far to the southeast between approximately km 508 and km 564, rejoining the existing route by way of the Fermont access road and no longer routing through Mont-Wright. Work started in 2023 and is expected to finish in 2028. MAP

The bridge over the Pékans River (around km 550) is a popular starting point for canoe trips down the Moisie River.

At km 564 is the town of Fermont, a mining town with a population of 2,918, and last Quebec port-of-call before entering Newfoundland and Labrador. Labrador City is 21 km further along what is now Highway 500, Wabush is 6 km south east of that on Highway 503 (which ends in Wabush). The Happy Valley-Goose Bay ferry terminal is located 526 km east of Wabush, along the shores of Lake Melville, with access to the Atlantic Ocean. The Labrador City/Fermont area border crossing is roughly the half-way point of the approximately 16-hour drive between the junction of Routes 138 and 389 in Baie-Comeau and the end of Route 500 (and adjunct Route 520) in Happy Valley – Goose Bay, Newfoundland and Labrador.

== Major intersections ==
RCM	Location	km	mi	Destinations	Notes
Manicouagan	Baie-Comeau	0	0.0	R-138 – Québec, Saguenay, Sept-Îles, Matane	Access to Matane and R-132 / R-195 via ferry (9 km away)
Manicouagan	Rivière-aux-Outardes	21	13	Jean-Lesage generating station (Manic-2)	
Manicouagan	Rivière-aux-Outardes	82	51	Access to Outardes-4 and the hamlet of Micoua	
Manicouagan	Rivière-aux-Outardes	86	53	Access to René-Lévesque generating station (Manic-3)	
Manicouagan	Rivière-aux-Outardes	211	131	Daniel-Johnson dam (Manic-5)	Road transitions from paved to gravel
Manicouagan	Rivière-aux-Outardes	308	191	Relais-Gabriel	Passes by René-Levasseur Island (no land connection); road transitions from gravel to paved; only services between Manic-5 and Fermont
Caniapiscau	Rivière-Mouchalagane	386	240	Gagnon	Ghost town, no services
Caniapiscau	Rivière-Mouchalagane	471	293	Fire Lake mine	Road transitions from paved to gravel
Caniapiscau	Fermont	537	334	Mont Wright mine	Road transitions from gravel to paved
Caniapiscau	Fermont	564	350	Boul. J.C. Ménard to Fermont	Fermont proper is 3 km to the east
Caniapiscau	Fermont	570	350	Route 500 east – Labrador City, Wabush	Continues into Labrador
Labrador City, Newfoundland and Labrador		587– 589	365– 366	Downtown Labrador City	
Labrador City, Newfoundland and Labrador		593	368	Route 503 south – Wabush, Wabush Airport	
1.000 mi = 1.609 km; 1.000 km = 0.621 mi: Route transition

== Municipalities along Route 389 ==
The road passes through the following municipalities and unorganized territories from south to north:

- Baie-Comeau
- Rivière-aux-Outardes
- Rivière-Mouchalagane
- Fermont

== See also ==
- List of Quebec provincial highways
