= Rivière-Mouchalagane =

- Unorganized territory
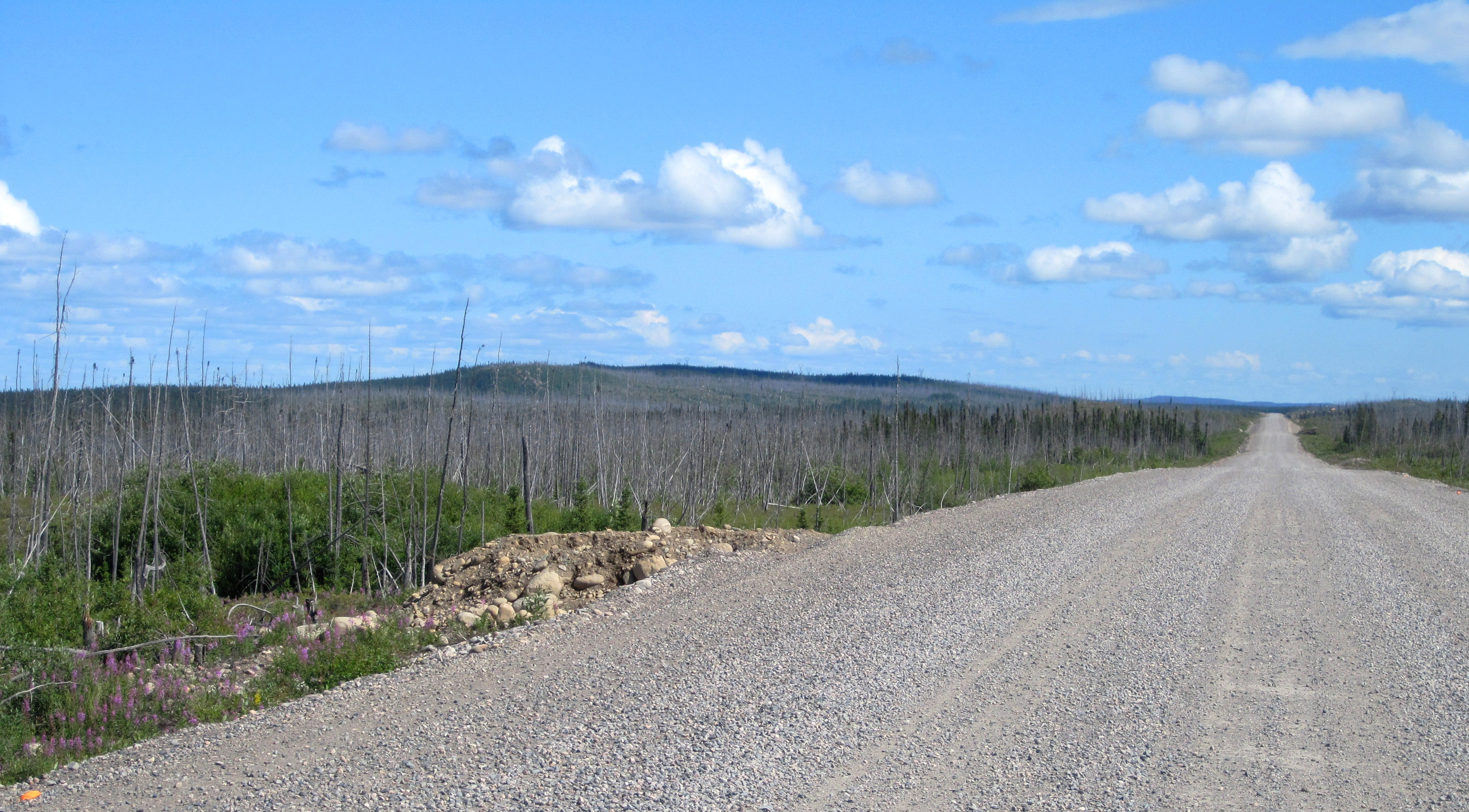

- Location in Côte-Nord Region of Quebec
- Coordinates: 52°20′N 68°30′W
- Country: Canada
- Province: Quebec
- Region: Côte-Nord
- RCM: Caniapiscau
- Constituted: January 1, 1986

Government
  - Federal riding: Côte-Nord—Kawawachikamach—Nitassinan
  - Prov. riding: Duplessis

Area
  - Total: 35,161.71 km^{2} (13,576.01 sq mi)
  - Land: 30,999.10 km^{2} (11,968.82 sq mi)

Population (2021)
  - Total: 15
  - Density: 0/km^{2} (0/sq mi)
  - Pop (2016-21): ▲200%
  - Dwellings: 40
- Time zone: UTC−05:00 (EST)
  - Summer (DST): UTC−04:00 (EDT)
- Highways: R-389

Rivière-Mouchalagane is an unorganized territory in the Côte-Nord region of Quebec, Canada, part of Caniapiscau Regional County Municipality.

The ghost town of Gagnon is located in the territory along Quebec Route 389 which also provides access to Fermont and Labrador City.

The eponymous Mouchalagane River has its source in Sommet and Itomamis Lakes, and flows for 132 kilometres (82 mi) to the south, after which it drains into the Manicouagan Reservoir. Before the formation of this reservoir, the river would flow into Lake Mouchalagane.

== Geography ==
This unorganized territory has 261 lakes, 27 rivers, 23 townships, 11 mountains with toponymic designation, 10 official river portages, three localities, a main road (route 389 linking Baie-Comeau and the Labrador border), four dams on the Hard-Jaune River, two reservoirs, one railroad (linking Port-Cartier to Mont-Wright) and the Uapishka Biodiversity Reserve.

The main mountains in this Unorganized territory, with a toponym registered in the Bank of place names of the Commission de toponymie du Québec are mostly located in the Monts Groulx: Montagne Blanche, Mont Harfang, Mont Jauffret, Mont Lamêlée Nord, Mont Langy, Mont Manic, Mount Megné, Mount Merry, Mount Reed, Mount de la Tour and Mount Tshenukufish.

The main rivers of this unorganized territory are: Atticoupi, Beaupin, Beaupré, Blough, Carheil, Félix, Grasse, Hart Jaune (or Uishauneu Shipu), Labadie, La ROnde, Le Gentilhomme, Lillishen, Petite rivière Manicouagan, Petite rivière Manicouagan Ouest, Marsac.

The following named localities are in this unorganized territory:

- Fire Lake (former iron mining site operated by Québec-Cartier Mining) located in the township of Bergeron;
- Gagnon (former northern municipality located northeast of the Manicouagan Reservoir, in the township of Chiasson) dedicated to the families of Fire Lake workers; the village of Gagnon was located on the southeast side of Barbel Lake, on the east bank of the Beaupré River;
- Tour-Boissinot (tower located northeast of the Manicouagan Reservoir, at the top of Mont Boissinot, in the township of Jauffret, near Mont Boissinot).

The cantons of the TNO are: Ashini, Audubon, Basset, Belle-Roche, Bernard, Bouat, Brien, Chaumont, Des Groseilliers, Faber, Fagundez, Falaise, Francheville, Gomez, Hachin, Hind, Noël, Roz, Sénécal, Sevestre, Stagni, Thury and Villeray.

== Demographics ==
Canada census – Rivière-Mouchalagane community profile

	2021	2016
Population	15 (+200.0% from 2016)	5 (% from 2011)
Land area	30,999.10 km^{2} (11,968.82 sq mi)	32,296.53 km^{2} (12,469.76 sq mi)
Population density	0.0/km^{2} (0/sq mi)	0.0/km^{2} (0/sq mi)
Median age	.n/a (M: .n/a, F: .n/a)	.n/a (M: .n/a, F: .n/a)
Private dwellings	40 (total) 6 (occupied)	2 (total) 2 (occupied)
Median household income	$.n/a	$.n/a

Notes: Age and incomed data suppressed for confidentiality.
References: 2021 2016

Historical census populations – Rivière-Mouchalagane, Quebec

Year	Pop.	±%
1991	0	—
1996	0	0.00%
2001	0	0.00%
2006	0	0.00%

Year	Pop.	±%
2011	0	0.00%
2016	5	—
2021	15	+200.0%

Source: Statistics Canada

== See also ==
- List of unorganized territories in Quebec
