= Gagnon, Quebec =

Ghost town in Canada

Gagnon
- Former city
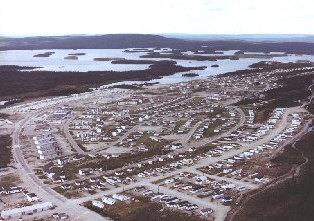

- Location within Quebec
- Coordinates: 51°53′30″N 68°09′45″W
- Country: Canada
- Province: Quebec
- Region: Côte-Nord
- RCM: Caniapiscau
- Settled: 1957
- Constituted: August 1, 1960

Government
  - Federal riding: Manicouagan
  - Prov. riding: Duplessis

Area
  - Total: 39.00 km^{2} (15.06 sq mi)
  - Land: 25.11 km^{2} (9.70 sq mi)
- Time zone: UTC−5 (EST)
  - Summer (DST): UTC−4 (EDT)
- Postal code(s): G0G 1K0
- Area codes: 418 and 581

Gagnon (French pronunciation: [ɡaɲɔ̃]) is a ghost town on Barbel Lake, formerly a mining town, in the Côte-Nord region of Quebec, Canada.

== History ==
Gagnon was founded by the Québec Cartier Mining Company for the purposes of mining iron ore at Jeannine Lake. In the winter of 1957, the first plane arrived, bringing materials to build a pilot plant. By August of that year, the plant had processed a thousand tons of ore. On January 28, 1960, it was incorporated as Ville de Gagnon and named after Onésime Gagnon, the first Minister of Mining in Quebec. In the summer of 1960, a large forest fire came within 400 metres (1,312 ft) of the town, prompting the evacuation of women and children. Thereafter it rapidly grew to 1300 inhabitants by the end of that year, and at its peak, Gagnon had more than 4000 residents. It had an airport, churches, schools, a town hall, an arena, a hospital, and a large commercial centre, despite being isolated and only accessible by plane. Some of its retailers included Provigo and The Bay.

In 1974, mining began at Fire Lake, some 80 kilometres (50 mi) north-east of Gagnon, while the Jeannine Lake Mine closed in 1977. By the mid-1980s however, following the iron crisis of 1982, it was no longer turning a profit. It lost half of its population in two years, from a high of 4000 residents in 1982 to 2000 in 1984. In October 1984, residents were informed in the basement of a local church that Sidbec-Normines would close its mine by December 31 of that year. As a town whose existence depended on the presence of Sidbec-Normines, the company's withdrawal basically met the end for Gagnon itself. It was announced that the town would officially be shut down by the end of June 1985.

The mines were closed and the town fully dismantled in 1985. During the summer of 1985, the schools, the health clinic and the provincial police protection all ceased operations, and basic services such as telephone and water were cut off, with electricity following suit in the fall of 1985. Demolition of the buildings started in late July 1985 and continued in 1986. All buildings and nearly all of the streets were dismantled.

The town's main street, the cemetery and the airport's runway are all that remains. The main street became part of Route 389 two years after the town's closure. That section of highway retains a boulevard configuration, complete with a median, sidewalks, and sewers, despite being deep in the wilderness, hundreds of kilometres from the nearest active community.
