= Mont Wright =

Mountain and mine in Quebec, Canada

Coordinates: 52°44′27″N 67°20′50″W

The Mont Wright mine in 2023

Mont Wright was a mountain in Fermont, Quebec, a site of major iron ore mining operations since the 1970s by Québec Cartier Mining Company. It is located in Caniapiscau Regional County Municipality.

Mont Wright itself does not exist anymore; it is now a 200 m (656 ft) deep pit. Today's production of Québec Cartier ore comes from nearby Mont Survie and Paul's Peek mountain.
