= Rapides River =

Rapides River Rivière des Rapides
- Location within Quebec

Location
- Country: Canada
- Province: Quebec
- Region: Côte-Nord
- RCM: Sept-Rivières

Physical characteristics
- Source
  - elevation: 640 metres (2,100 ft)
- Mouth: Gulf of Saint Lawrence
  - coordinates: 50.2686111°N 66.4572222°W
  - elevation: 0 metres (0 ft)
- Length: 48 kilometres (30 mi)
- Basin size: 573 square kilometres (221 sq mi)

The Rapides River (French: Rivière des Rapides) is a river in the Côte-Nord region of Quebec, Canada. It empties into the Gulf of Saint Lawrence.

== Location ==
The Rapides River flows from north to south for 48 kilometres (30 mi), falling from an altitude of 640 metres (2,100 ft) to sea level. The river mouth forms a small bay 200 metres (660 ft) wide and 400 metres (1,300 ft) long that opens into the Sept Îles Bay past Père-Conan island. The mouth of the Rapides River is in the municipality of Sept-Îles in the Sept-Rivières Regional County Municipality. It enters Sept-Îles bay to the west of the community of Sept-Îles. The origin of the name is not known. It was made official on 5 December 1968.

The Aylmer-Whittom Park at the mouth of the river, also known as Squirrel Park, is an area of natural mixed woodland, dominated by spruce and lichen. There are several trails through the park, and two observation towers to observe the bay and the birds that nest there. One tower has observation binoculars. There is a miniature village for children.

== Description ==
According to the Dictionnaire des rivières et lacs de la province de Québec (1914),

This watercourse on the north coast of the Saint Lawrence, Saguenay County, discharges into the Sept-Iles bay 300 miles below Quebec. This river has two waterfalls, of which the first is one mile and the second 31 miles from its mouth. A few hundred yards from its mouth there is a great mass of iron ore encased in the norite and labradorite rock of the region.

== Basin ==
The Rapides River basin cover 573 square kilometres (221 sq mi). It is elongated along a north–south axis, 40 kilometres (25 mi) long and 10–20 kilometres (6.2–12.4 mi) wide. It lies between the basins of the Sainte-Marguerite River to the west and the Moisie River to the east. The basin is partly in the unorganized territory of Lac-Walker (80.7%) and partly in the municipality of Sept-Îles (19.3%). Part of the basin is in the Zec Matimek, which covers 144 square kilometres (56 sq mi) of the western side.

Most of the watershed is on a high plateau with deep valleys in which steep slopes can rise for more than 300 metres (980 ft). The highest point is at an altitude of 716 metres (2,349 ft) in the north of the watershed. The piedmont area between the coastal plan and the plateau is about 4 kilometres (2.5 mi) wide. It contains rounded rocky hills up to 250 metres (820 ft) high. The coastal plain in the south is less than 2 kilometres (1.2 mi) wide, and is fairly flat, rising to about 60 metres (200 ft) of elevation.

The bedrock is mainly magmatic, deformed to some extent, including migmatite, anorthosite, gabbronorite and granodioritic or granitoid gneiss. On the plateau the bedrock is usually exposed, although in some areas there is undifferentiated glacial till no more than 2 metres (6 ft 7 in) deep. Some of the valleys hold glaciofluvial sediments. In the piedmont and the coastal plain large amounts of silt and clay were deposited by the Goldthwait Sea after the glaciers retreated. As the land rebounded from the weight of the ice and the sea retreated, these fine sediments were covered by coarse sandy estuarine and deltaic sediments.

== Hydrology ==
The rivers and streams in the northern plateau follow angular courses dictated by fractures in the bedrock, which are fairly rectilinear and constrained by narrow valleys. Downstream the watercourses meander in the soft deposits of the piedmont and coastal plain. The main tributaries of the Rapides River are the Desmeules, Deschênes and Champion rivers, which drain the northeast, southeast and southwest parts of the watershed. The Bouleau waterfall on the Rapides River is above its confluence with the Desmeules River. There are three waterfalls in the lower section of the river between the outlet of Lake Rapides and the river mouth, the Outarde at 6.1 kilometres (3.8 mi), the Grosse Chute at 3.1 kilometres (1.9 mi) and the Cran de Fer at 1.7 kilometres (1.1 mi) from the mouth.

The river basin includes several large and irregular-shaped lakes, Lake Grand Rapides at 9.3 square kilometres (3.6 sq mi), Lake Rapides at 7.8 square kilometres (3.0 sq mi), Lake Curot at 6.2 square kilometres (2.4 sq mi), Lake Tortellier at 3.3 square kilometres (1.3 sq mi) and Lake Hingan at 2.8 square kilometres (1.1 sq mi). Waterbodies cover 8.31% of the basin. Ombrotrophic peat bogs cover 0.95% of the area, mostly on the coastal plain with its flat relief and fine sediments.

A gauging station 3.1 kilometres (1.9 mi) from the Rapides River's mouth made continuous measurements from 1947 to 1983. It showed an annual average flow of 16.4 cubic metres per second (580 cu ft/s), varying during the year from 3.25 to 38.3 cubic metres per second (115 to 1,353 cu ft/s).

== Environment ==
A map of the ecological regions of Quebec shows the river in sub-regions 6j-T and 6m-T of the east spruce/moss subdomain. The forest cover is dominated by black spruce (Picea mariana), balsam fir (Abies balsamea) and to a lesser extent hardwoods such as paper birch (Betula papyrifera), trembling aspen (Populus tremuloides) and balsam poplar (Populus balsamifera). The Rapides River is not recognized as a salmon river. Fish species are rainbow smelt (Osmerus mordax), American eel (Anguilla rostrata), brook trout (Salvelinus fontinalis), ninespine stickleback (Pungitius pungitius) and lake whitefish (Coregonus clupeaformis).

== Sources ==
- "Parc Aylmer-Whittom – Rivière des Rapides", Plein air À la carte (in French)
- Portrait du bassin versant des Rapides (PDF) (in French), OBV Duplessis
- Portrait préliminaire de la zone de gestion intégrée de l'eau par bassin versant Duplessis (PDF) (in French), OBV Duplessis, April 2015, archived from the original (PDF) on 2019-09-02
- Rivière des Rapides (in French), Commission de toponymie du Québec
- Rivière des Rapides (in French), Ressources naturelles Canada
- Rouillard, Eugène (1914), "Rapides, (Rivière "des")", Dictionnaire des rivières et lacs de la province de Québec (in French), Québec. Département des terres et forêts
- Saucier, J.-P.; Robitaille, A.; Grondin, P.; Bergeron, J.-F.; Gosselin, J. (2011), Les régions écologiques du Québec méridional (PDF) (map), 4 (in French), Ministère des Ressources naturelles et de la Faune, archived from the original (PDF) on 2020-06-19
