= Clarke City =

Clarke City may refer to:

- Clarke City, California, former name of Greenfield, California
- Clarke City, Quebec
