= Chrono Aviation =

Canadian charter airline

Chrono Aviation Inc.
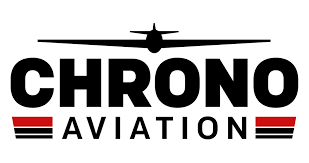

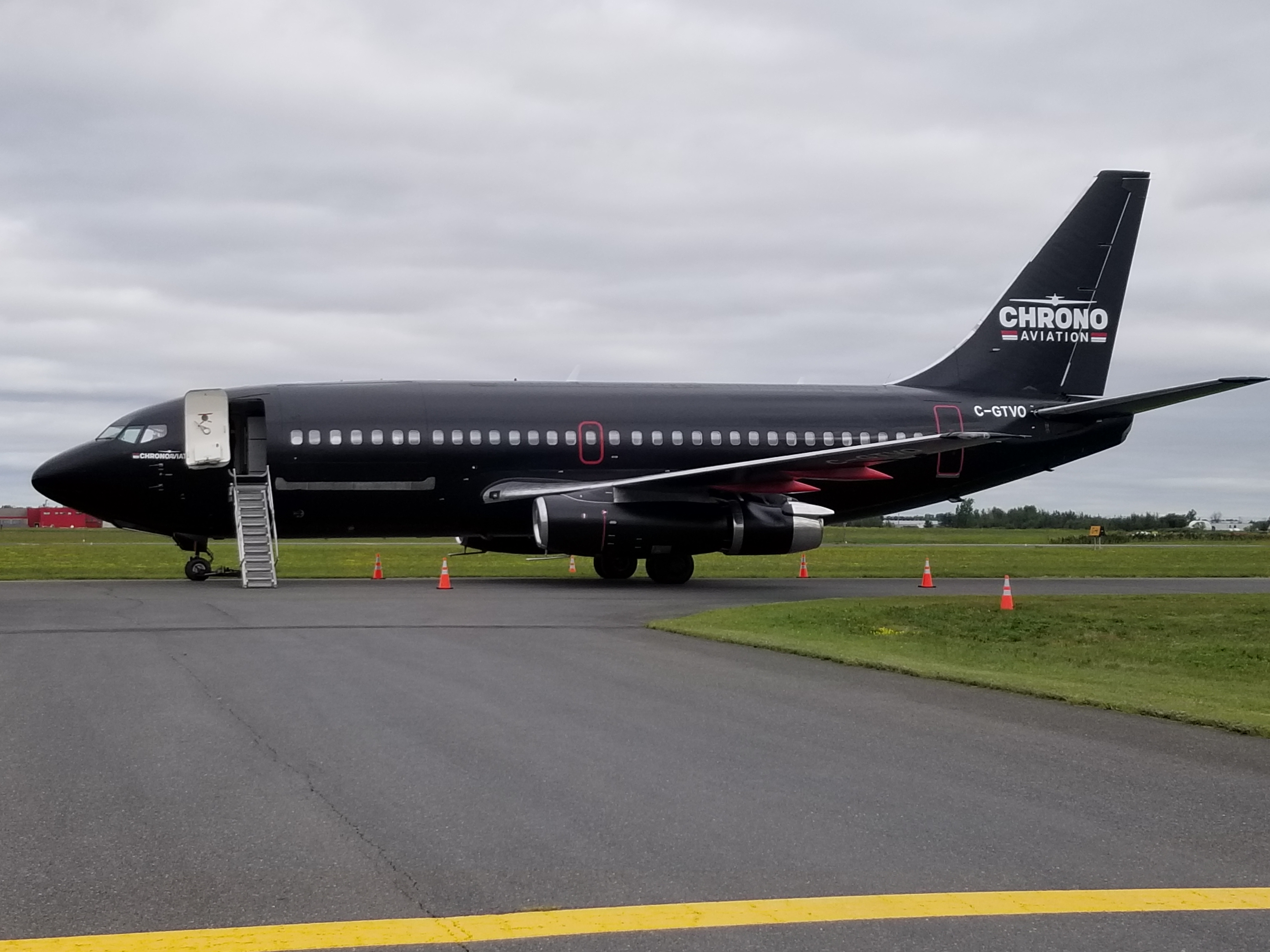
- C-GTVO, Boeing 737-200
IATA	ICAO	Call sign
MB* (Note: Chrono Jet) (Note: Controlled duplicate of MNG Airlines.)	NDL (Note: Chrono Aviation); MBK	NEEDLE; MATBLACK
- Founded: 2012
- AOC #: Canada: 17931 (Chrono Aviation); Canada: 18498 (Chrono Jet); United States: 2C0F389F (Chrono Aviation); United States: 2OJF535F (Chrono Jet)
- Operating bases: Montreal Metropolitan; Québec City; Rimouski
- Subsidiaries: Chrono Jet Inc.
- Fleet size: 15
- Headquarters: Jean Lesage International Airport, Quebec City, Quebec, Canada
- Key people: Vincent Gagnon (President); Dany Gagnon (Vice-President)
- Employees: 300
- Website: https://www.chronoaviation.com/en/home/

Chrono Aviation Inc., and its wholly owned subsidiary Chrono Jet Inc., is a charter airline headquartered at Québec City Jean Lesage International Airport. It operates aircraft in passenger (9 to 120), cargo and combi roles. It has bases at MET – Montreal Metropolitan Airport (formerly Montréal Saint-Hubert Longueuil Airport), Québec City Jean Lesage International Airport and Rimouski Aerodrome. It has over 265 employees. As of 18 October 2024, it was announced that Chrono Group, the owners of Chrono Aviation, had been placed in receivership. This was ordered by the Superior Court of Quebec under the Companies' Creditors Arrangement Act as Chrono was unable to pay their creditors.

== History ==
Chrono Aviation was founded in 2012 by Vincent Gagnon and Dany Gagnon with a single Pilatus PC-12 and two pilots. Later in that same year, the company purchased its second aircraft.

In 2014, the company acquired their first Beechcraft 1900D.

In 2016 they obtained the authority to conduct Canadian Aviation Regulations Part 705 operations with more than 37 passengers allowing for the operation of their first Dash 8-100 in 2017. The airline immediately upgraded the Dash 8 with brand new avionics worth $1.5 million and the cockpit was also upgraded with 3-D terrain vision.

In 2018, the company unveiled its first Boeing 737-200 airliner with a second following shortly thereafter. These aircraft can carry passengers or various combinations of passengers and cargo, and are able to operate to and from unpaved runway gravel strips.

The company briefly operated a Dassault Falcon 50EX from 2017 to 2020 and a Citation CJ4 from 2019 to 2020.

In 2019, Chrono Aviation and Arctic Co-operatives Limited (ACL) Announced the awarding of a contract from Baffinland Iron Mines Corp for the provision of air transport services to the Mary River Mine. Chrono Aviation was to fly three to five flights a week from their base at MET – Montreal Metropolitan Airport.

In October 2019, the company announced the groundbreaking of their 6,100 m^{2} (66,000 ft^{2}) hangar project being constructed at the MET – Montreal Metropolitan Airport which the ACL contract supported. that same year, the airline also outfitted their aircraft with SKYTRAC's ISAT-200A SATCOM terminals for real-time flight following, voice communications, and weather tracking capabilities. Operating on the Iridium Communications network, this system allows the airline to track every flight, send weather data, and remain in direct communication with the flight crew.

In 2020, Chrono Aviation was ranked 213 out of 400 of the fastest growing companies in Canada based on a report published by The Globe and Mail. In 2021, Chrono Aviation was again recognized and ranked 167 out of 400 of the fastest growing companies in Canada.

Chrono Aviation had previously announced that it had added a Boeing 737-800, formerly belonging to Air Transat to its fleet. However, on July 6, 2021, the aircraft was deregistered by Chrono Jet. On December 7, 2021, Chrono Aviation announced that it would commence exclusive dedicated cargo operations utilizing a Boeing 737-800SF starting January 2022. Chrono will be first operator of the type in Canada. In the fall of 2021, the airline also began to use its new state of the art 6,100 m^{2} (66,000 ft^{2}) hangar.

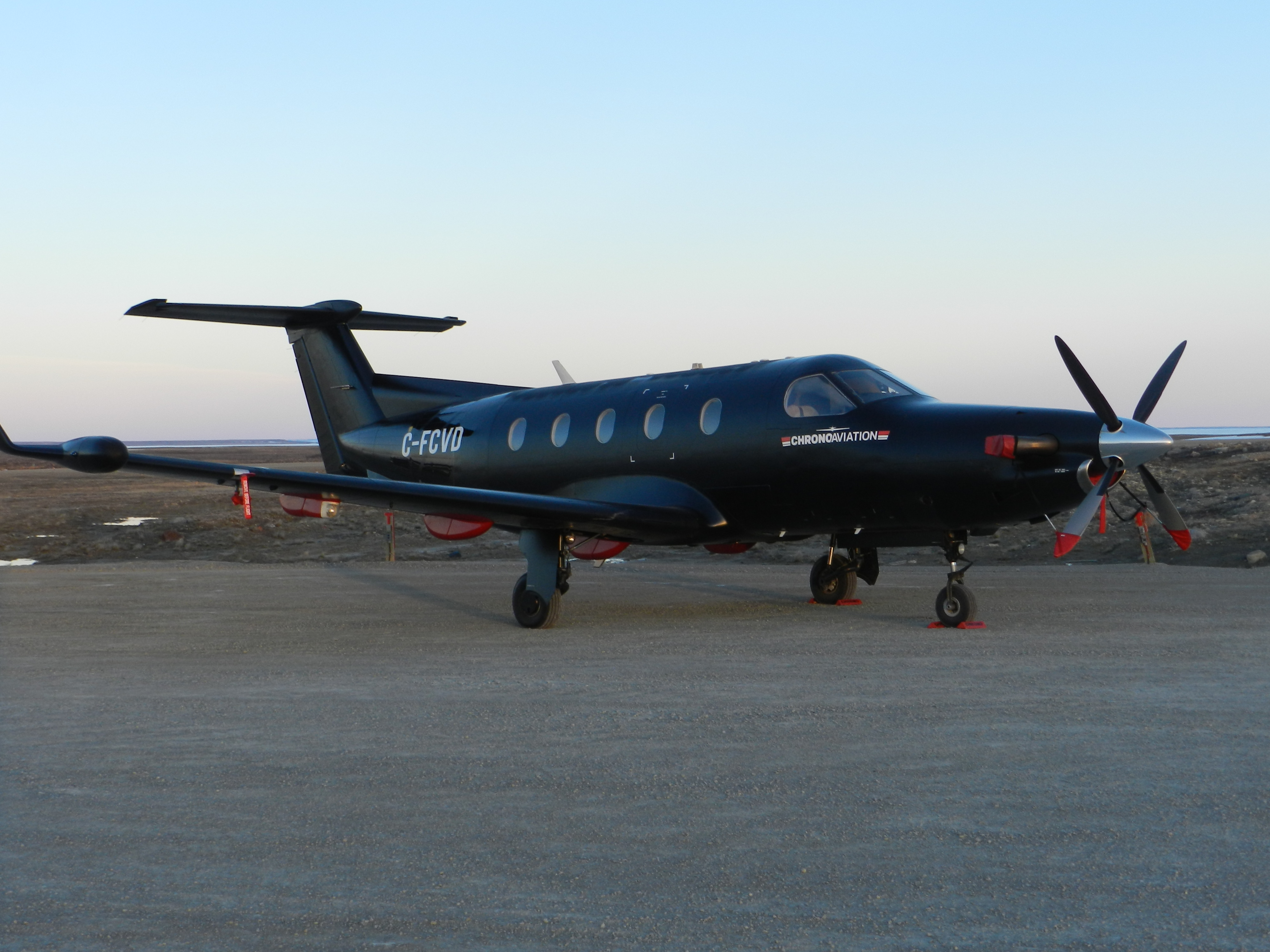
Chrono Aviation Pilatus PC12 at Cambridge Bay Airport

== Operations ==
Chrono Aviation's primary bases are:

- MET – Montreal Metropolitan Airport
- Québec City Jean Lesage International Airport
- Rimouski Aerodrome

Chrono Aviation is focused on the non-scheduled charter business in Quebec (primarily in Northern Quebec and Nunavik), Nunavut, the rest of Canada, the United States and the Caribbean.

== Livery ==
Chrono Aviation's livery is very distinct. Almost all their aircraft are painted matte black. Their accent colour is red.

Chrono has also done wraps for special occasions such as Canada's 150th birthday and Star Wars.

== Ownership ==
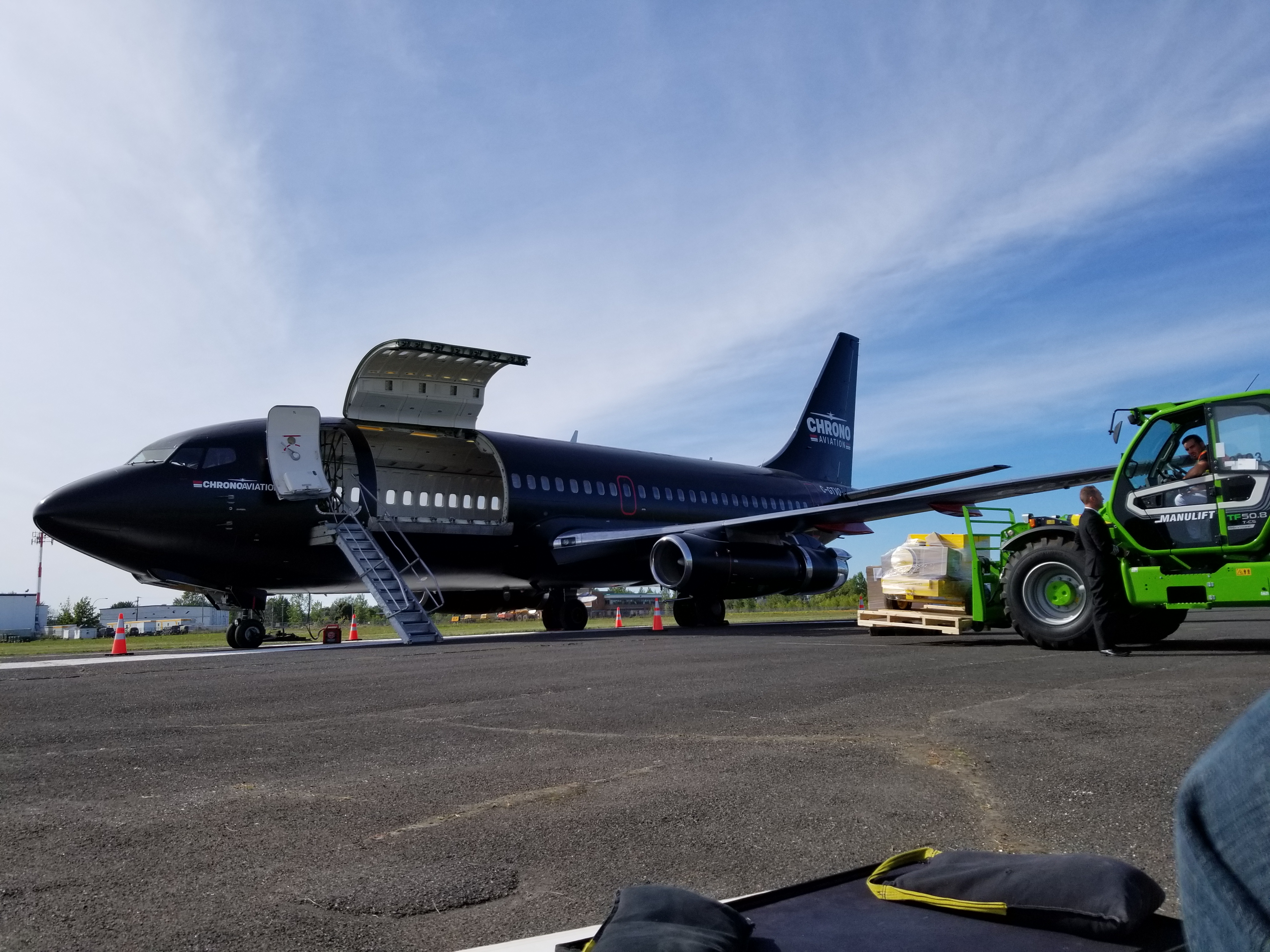
Chrono Aviation Boeing 737-200

Chrono Aviation Inc. is owned by Dany Gagnon, Vincent Gagnon and Larga Capital Inc.

Chrono Jet Inc., the operator of Chrono's Dash-8 100 and 737-200 fleets, is a wholly owned subsidiary of Chrono Aviation Inc.

In addition, the company owns the following partnership companies with northern Quebec First Nations.

- Chrono Aviation Nemaska Inc.
- Chrono Aviation Wemindji Inc.
- Chrono Aviation Waswanipi Inc.
- Waasheshkun Chrono Aviation Inc.

WAAS Aerospace and Lux FBO are sister companies of Chrono Aviation Inc.

iFlyCollege, a flight training school based at Québec City Jean Lesage International Airport, is a sister company and the primary feeder school for Chrono Aviation.

== Fleet ==
As of 5 August 2025, Chrono Aviation and Chrono Jet had the following aircraft:

Chrono Aviation fleet
Aircraft	No. of aircraft	Variants	Notes
Beechcraft 1900	2	1900D	Seats up to 19 passengers. Can be freight only.
Boeing 737	2	200 series	Combi aircraft, can carry up to 120 passengers, equipped with gravel kits. Operated by Chrono Jet.
Boeing 737 Next Generation	2	800 series	One freighter, stored.
Cessna Citation X	1		Business jet, carries up to 8 passengers.
De Havilland Canada Dash 8	1	100 series	Carries up to 37 passengers. Operated by Chrono Jet.
Pilatus PC-12	7	PC-12/45, PC-12/47	Carries up to 9 passengers.
Total	15		
