= Lake Cacaoui =

Lake in Quebec, Canada

- Lac Cacaoui (French)
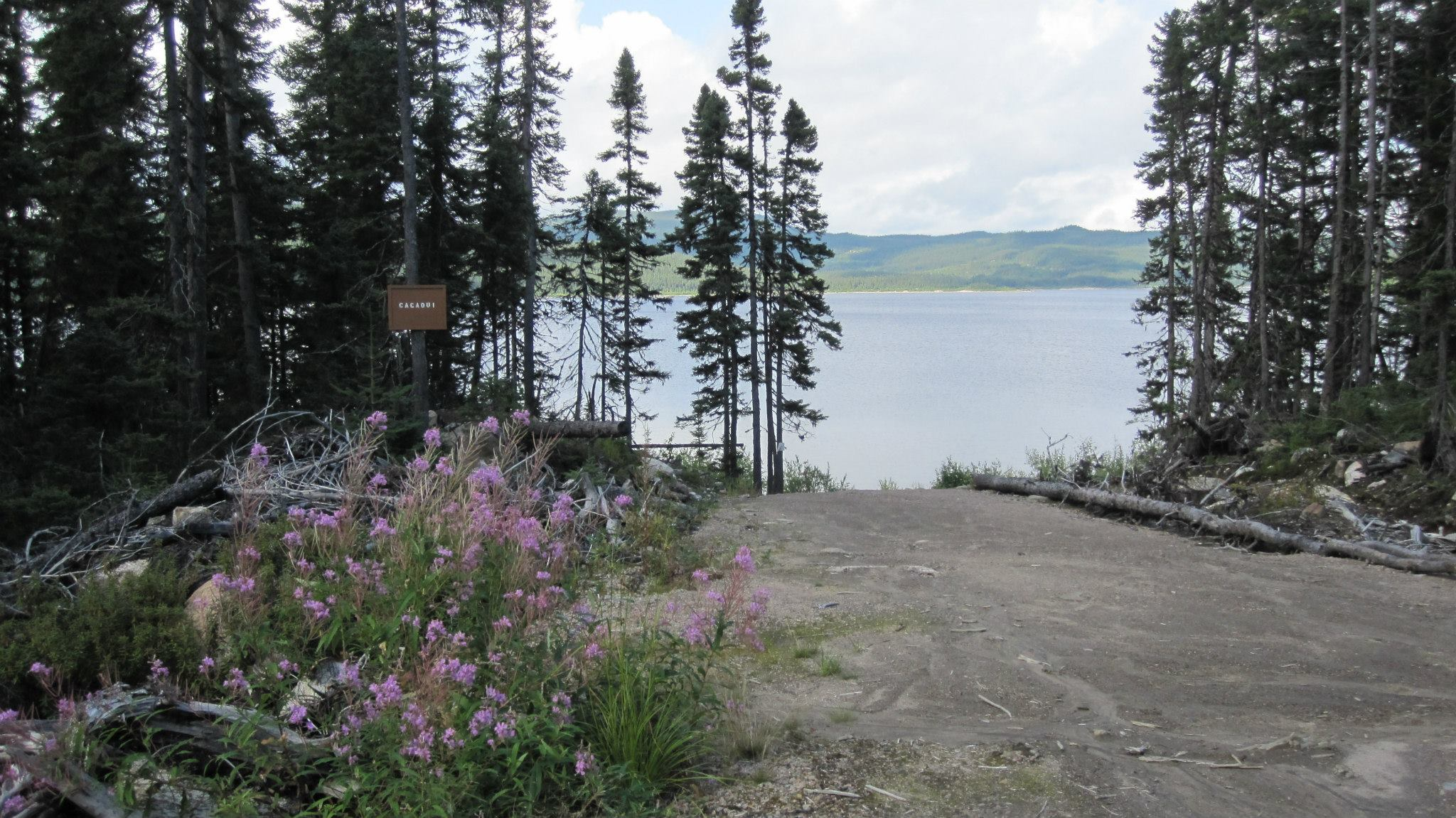
- View of the lake

- Location within Quebec
- Coordinates: 50.899167°N 66.968056°W
- Catchment area: 134 square kilometres (52 sq mi)
- Surface area: 1,750.3 hectares (4,325 acres)
- Water volume: 26,254,350 cubic metres (927,164,000 cu ft)
- Surface elevation: 432 metres (1,417 ft)

Lake Cacaoui (French: Lac Cacaoui) is a lake in the Côte-Nord region of Quebec, Canada. It drains into the Sainte-Marguerite River.

== Location ==
Lake Cacaoui is in the unorganized territory of Lac-Walker, part of the Sept-Rivières Regional County Municipality. The Cacaoui River leaves the west of the lake and runs north through a stretch of rapids into the Sainte-Marguerite River. Little Lake Cacaoui (Petit lac Cacaoui) connects to the main lake at its south end. The lake is at an elevation of 432 metres (1,417 ft). It is about 80 kilometres (50 mi) northwest of Sept-Îles.

== Name ==
The name "Cacaoui" is a variant of kakawi, the local name of the long-tailed duck (Clangula hyemalis). According to Placide Vigneau (1842−1926), who wrote about the Mingan Archipelago and Havre-Saint-Pierre, the duck's name should be written as kakawit, and the local people of the Havre-Saint-Pierre region pronounce it as cacaoite. The duck is loquacious, with a musical call that sounds like "ah-ah-wè", which may be the basis for the name. The name was approved by the Geography Commission in 1945.

== Dam ==
IOC (Iron Ore Company), a Rio Tinto subsidiary, owns the SM-2 hydroelectric plant on the Sainte-Marguerite River. IOC also owned the wooden dam on the Cacaoui Lake reservoir. This dam was built in 1950. It had fallen into decay and was dismantled in 2010 and replaced with a structure of local rocks to naturally control the water flowing into the western part of the lake. The work was done by the Groupe Nordique, and involved dismantling several buildings and dams, and recovering iron. The rockfill weir is 1.5 metres (4 ft 11 in) high and 15 metres (49 ft) long. The reservoir has an area of 1,750.3 hectares (4,325 acres). The watershed covers 134 square kilometres (52 sq mi).

== Environment ==
The lake is in the boreal climate zone. A map of the Ecological regions of Quebec places the lake in the 6J-S ecological subregion, part of the eastern spruce/moss domain of the boreal zone. The average annual temperature in the neighborhood is −3 °C (27 °F). The warmest month is July, when the average temperature is 13 °C (55 °F), and the coldest is January, with −20 °C (−4 °F). The region is one of mountains that rise high above their surroundings, with rocky escarpments. The network of lakes and rivers is enclosed in narrow valleys.

The Forêt ancienne du Lac-Cacaoui (Lake Cacaoui Old Growth Forest), an exceptional forest ecosystem occupies part of the southern shore of the lake. The forest contains small islands of a few hectares of Picea glauca (white spruce) up to 33 metres (108 ft) high within stands of Picea mariana (black spruce). The spruce is dominated by Abies balsamea (balsam fir), which is well adapted to the cold and damp climate. The 0.45 square kilometres (0.17 sq mi) area of old-growth forest was designated IUCN Management Category III at a national level in 2008. It is managed by the Ministère des Forêts, de la Faune et des Parcs.

== Visiting ==
The lake is within the Matimek zone d'exploitation contrôlée (controlled use zone). The Zec rents a cabin to visitors that can sleep four people. The cabin has a wood stove, propane fridge and cooker, and solar electricity supplying the lighting system. In September 2018 two brothers died in a boating accident on the lake. This part of the lake is over 300 feet (91 m) deep in places, and divers were unable to find the bodies.

== Sources ==
- Forêt ancienne du Lac-Cacaoui (PDF) (in French), Ressources naturelles et la Faune, Québec
- "Forêt ancienne du Lac-Cacaoui in Canada", Protected Plant
- Groupe Nordique Réalisations (in French), Groupe Nordique
- Hébergement & camping (in French), Zec Matimek
- Lac Cacaoui (in French), Commission de toponymie du Québec
- "Lac Cacaoui", Mapcarta
- Lac Cacaoui, Ressources naturelles Canada
- Morasse, Mathieu (20 September 2018), "Noyades au lac Cacaoui : elles ont nagé des heures pour survivre", Le Nord-Côtier (in French)
- NASA Earth Observations Data Set Index, NASA, archived from the original on 2015-03-06
- Peel, M. C.; Finlayson, B. L.; McMahon, T. A. (2007). "Updated world map of the Köppen-Geiger climate classification" (PDF). Hydrology and Earth System Sciences. 11 (5): 1633–1644. Bibcode:2007HESS...11.1633P. doi:10.5194/hess-11-1633-2007. Archived (PDF) from the original on 2019-12-02.
- Rapport sur le développement durable 2010 (PDF) (in French), Rio Tinto IOC
- Saucier, J.-P.; Robitaille, A.; Grondin, P.; Bergeron, J.-F.; Gosselin, J. (2011), Les régions écologiques du Québec méridional (PDF) (map), 4 (in French), Ministère des Ressources naturelles et de la Faune, archived from the original (PDF) on 2020-06-19
- "X2091009", Répertoire des barrages (in French), Ministère du Développement durable, de l’Environnement et de la Lutte contre les changements climatiques (MDDELCC)
