= Eugene Belliveau =

Canadian football player (born 1958)

Profile
- Position: Defensive tackle

Personal information
- Born: May 30, 1958 (age 68); Clarke City, Quebec, Canada

Career information
- University: St. Francis Xavier University

Career history
- 1980–1981: Montreal Alouettes
- 1982–1984: Montreal Concordes
- 1985–1989: Calgary Stampeders

Eugene Belliveau (born May 30, 1958) is a Canadian former professional football defensive lineman.

Belliveau was born in Clarke City, Quebec. He played college football at St. Francis Xavier University and played ten seasons in the Canadian Football League for the Montreal Alouettes and the Calgary Stampeders.
