= Air Gaspé =

Canadian airline

IATA	ICAO	Call sign
QJ	-	-
- Commenced operations: 1951
- Ceased operations: 1986
- Headquarters: Sept-Îles, Quebec
- Key people: Michel Pouliot

Air Gaspé was a Canadian airline headquartered in Sept-Îles, Quebec.

The airline began charter flights in 1951 as Trans-Gaspesian Air Lines ans renamed to the current in 1966. In 1973 became a subsidiary of Quebecair but continued with own name until 1986. The airline operated scheduled passenger and cargo flights from Gaspé to other Canadian cities.

== Destinations ==
- Bonaventure
- Charlo
- Gaspé
- Havre Saint-Pierre
- Îles-de-la-Madeleine
- Matane/Russell-Burnett
- MontJoli
- Port-Menier
- Québec City Jean Lesage
- Sainte-Anne-des-Monts
- Sept-Îles

== Fleet ==
- Beech 18
- Cessna 180
- DHC-2 Beaver
- Douglas DC-3
- Grumman Widgeon
- Hawker Siddeley HS 748
- Lockheed 10 Electra
- Piper Apache
- Piper Navajo

== Accidents and incidents ==
- On 29 May 1973, Douglas C-47A CF-QBB crashed on approach to Rimouski Airport, killing all four people on board.

== See also ==
- List of defunct airlines of Canada
