= Sainte-Marguerite River (Sept-Îles) =

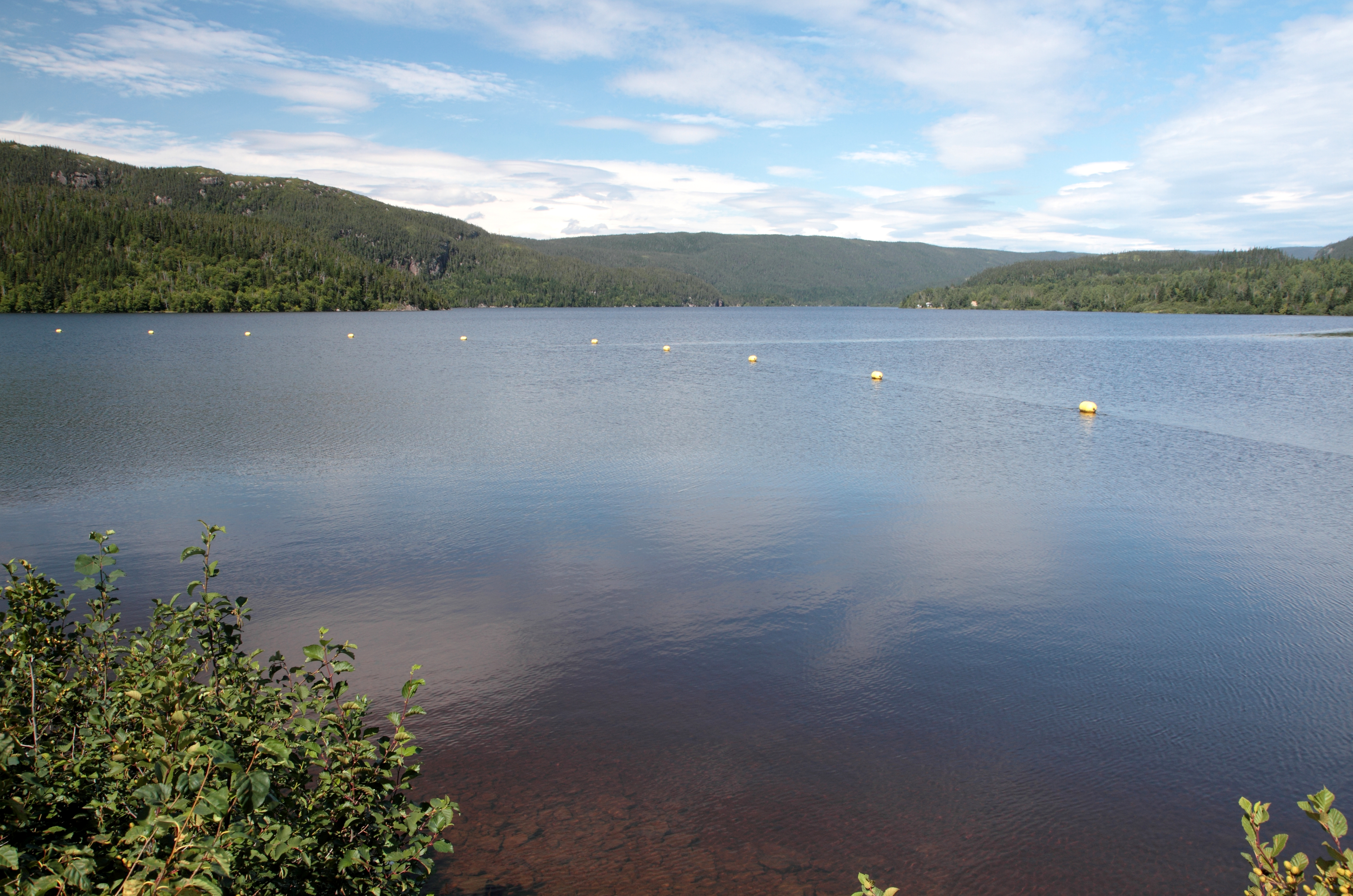
- Sainte-Marguerite river, upstream of Sainte-Marguerite 2 Dam

- Location within Quebec
- Native name: Rivière Sainte-Marguerite (French)

Location
- Country: Canada
- Province: Quebec
- Region: Côte-Nord

Physical characteristics
- Mouth
  - coordinates: 50.14278°N 66.59666°W
- Length: 316 kilometres (196 mi)
- Basin size: 6,190 square kilometres (2,390 sq mi)

Basin features
- Tributaries
  - left: Jean-Pierre EGTQL; Kausseshkau EJWHK; Dumais EJBKD
  - right: Montagne Blanche EHHOR; Tabac EIFQZ; Cacaouii EFSGL; Coulée EIPAN; Petite Coulée EFZXR; Charles EFWCY; Ferrée EGITD; Valin EIKAP; Valin Ouest EIKAR
- Bridges
- MNR Id: EJGWT

The Sainte-Marguerite River (French: Rivière Sainte-Marguerite, pronounced [ʁivjɛʁ sɛ̃t maʁɡəʁit]; Saint Margaret River) is a 316 kilometres (196 mi) long river in the Côte-Nord region of Quebec, Canada. It flows into the Gulf of Saint Lawrence to the west of Sept-Îles. There are traces of human activity along the river from 4,000 years ago. Pulp and paper exploitation in the river basin began in the early 20th century, followed by mining. The river has a large hydroelectric power dam, the Denis-Perron dam, that contains a reservoir that is 140 kilometres (87 mi) long.

== Course ==
The Sainte-Marguerite River is in the middle Côte-Nord, between Baie-Comeau and Havre-Saint-Pierre. The catchment area is 6,190 square kilometres (2,390 sq mi). It lies between the basins of the Dominique River to the west and the Rapides River to the east. The river originates in the northeast of the canton of Hind. It rises to the northeast of the Petit lac Manicouagan. From near the border with Labrador, the river flows first through a mountainous region, and then for more than 200 kilometres (120 mi) through a coastal plain. It is 316 kilometres (196 mi) long. Much of the southern part of the river basin, up to the Réservoir Sainte-Marguerite 3, is part of the Zec Matimek.

The hamlet of Barrage-Sainte-Marguerite is about 10 kilometres (6.2 mi) north of the river mouth. It grew up around the hydroelectric plant built in 1908 by the Clarke brothers on the site of the Amont Falls. Highway 138 crosses the dam.

The Sainte-Marguerite River enters the Gulf of Saint Lawrence about 30 kilometres (19 mi) by road west of Sept-Îles. Its mouth is to the southwest of the Baie des Sept-Îles. During the Holocene the Sainte-Marguerite created a delta of thick paraglacial and post-glacial sediments that completely cover the glacial landforms and glaciomarine deposits near the river mouth.

The river mouth today is a haven for small boats during bad weather in the Gulf, because the basin that it forms is protected by the Pointe Sainte-Marguerite. However, the channel of the river through the basin varies from year to year. The village of Rivière-Sainte-Marguerite-en-Bas is on the west bank of the mouth.

== Name ==
The name was used as early as 1603, when Samuel de Champlain wrote, "we came to anchor near a river called Saincte Marguerite". There is another large river with this name in Quebec, the Sainte-Marguerite River (Saguenay), an 80 kilometres (50 mi) tributary of the Saguenay River. Other names include Tshimanipishtuk River and Tshishe-Manipishtuk.

== Environment ==
A map of the Ecological regions of Quebec shows the river rising and flowing south through the eastern spruce/moss domain of the boreal zone. The last section of the river flows through the fir/white birch domain of the boreal zone.

== Archaeology ==
A project to build a third Hydro-Québec dam on the river about 80 kilometres (50 mi) from its mouth led to a project to make an inventory of archaeological sites and to excavate several sites. The project was managed in 1991–1998 by Cérane (Centre d’étude et de recherche en archéologie du Nord-Est). 67 sites were found, of which 12 were explored and one was studied intensively.

The Grand Portage section is less than 100 kilometres (62 mi) from the river's mouth. Over a stretch of 11 kilometres (6.8 mi) this section has a series of waterfalls and impassible rapids. The portage to bypass these obstacles could take a week. There are indications that people have used the portage for 4,000 years. There seem to have been different groups of people in the Sainte-Marguerite valley, separated by the Grand Portage. The people to the south were associated with the world of the Saint Lawrence coast, while those to the north were more associated with the large interior lakes. The oldest known site on the Sainte-Marguerite is found on the portage, a temporary halt where hunters took the time to cut or sharpen spear points about 4,000 years ago. Another site along the Grand Portage is on the north shore of Lac Jourdain (map), containing 11 structures with 61 stone tools and over 7,000 shards.

A site on the upper river dating to between 600 and 1000 years ago indicates that the occupants caught fish and smoked their catch there. The site seems to have been occupied only occasionally, and only by men rather than by families. A prehistoric site of about 350 square metres (3,800 sq ft) has been identified on the flat right shore of the Rivière Jean-Pierre, at the extreme northeast of the SM-3 reservoir. Excavation of a small part of the site has found 35 stone tools, 383 splinters and six or seven fireplaces. There were 21 types of stone in the assembly, indicating that the occupants were in contact with groups to their west, northwest and north.

== Hydroelectricity ==
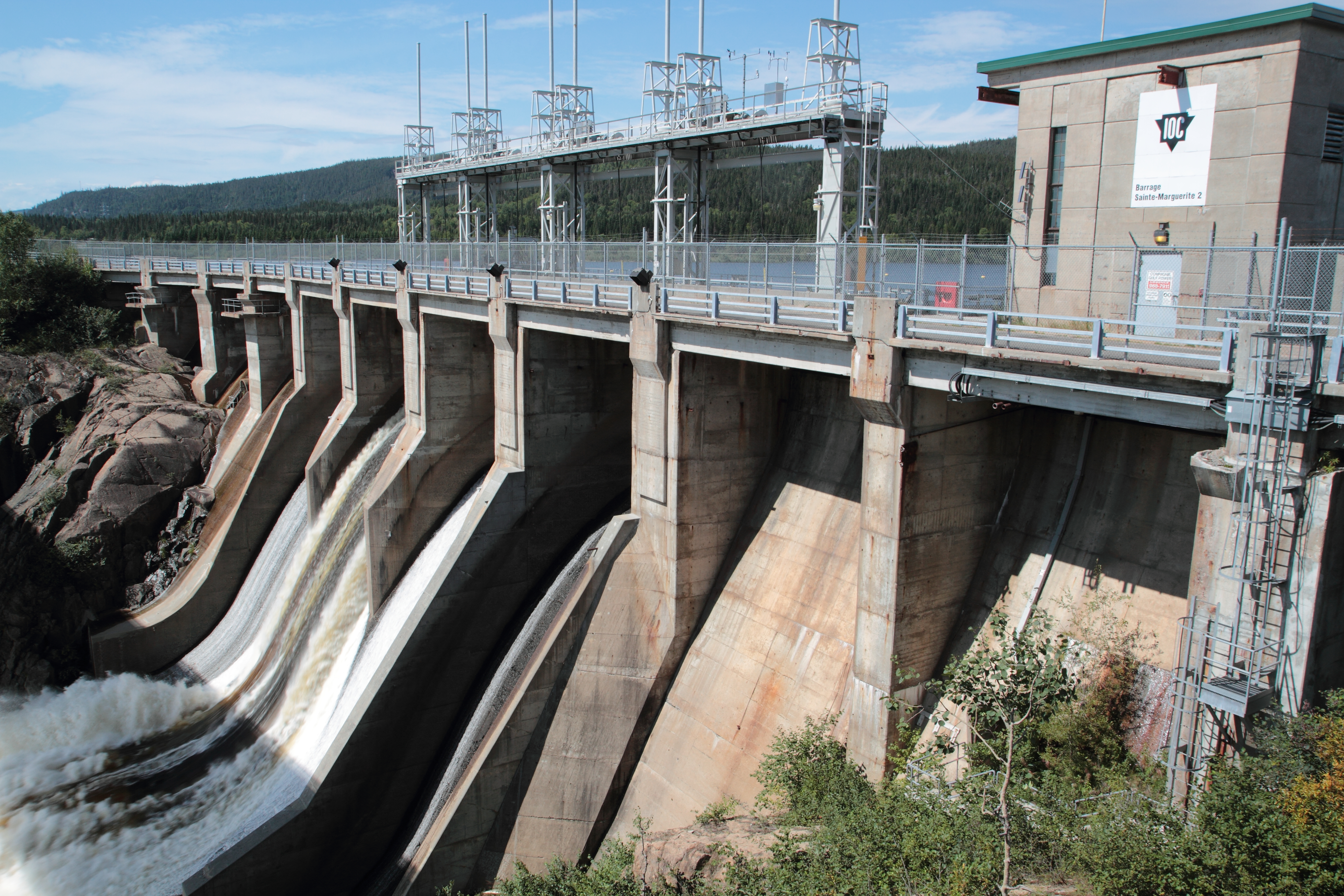
Barrage Sainte-Marguerite 2

There are three hydroelectric dams on the river, the first two near its mouth and the third and largest about 90 kilometres (56 mi) inland.

Dam	Coordinates	Area	Capacity MW	Commissioned
Sainte-Marguerite-1	50.1975°N 66.6365°W		30.5	1993
Sainte-Marguerite-2	50.2132°N 66.6614°W	1,040 hectares (2,600 acres)	17.6	1954
Sainte-Marguerite-3	50.7908°N 66.7913°W	31,500 hectares (78,000 acres)	882	2003

=== Clarke City ===
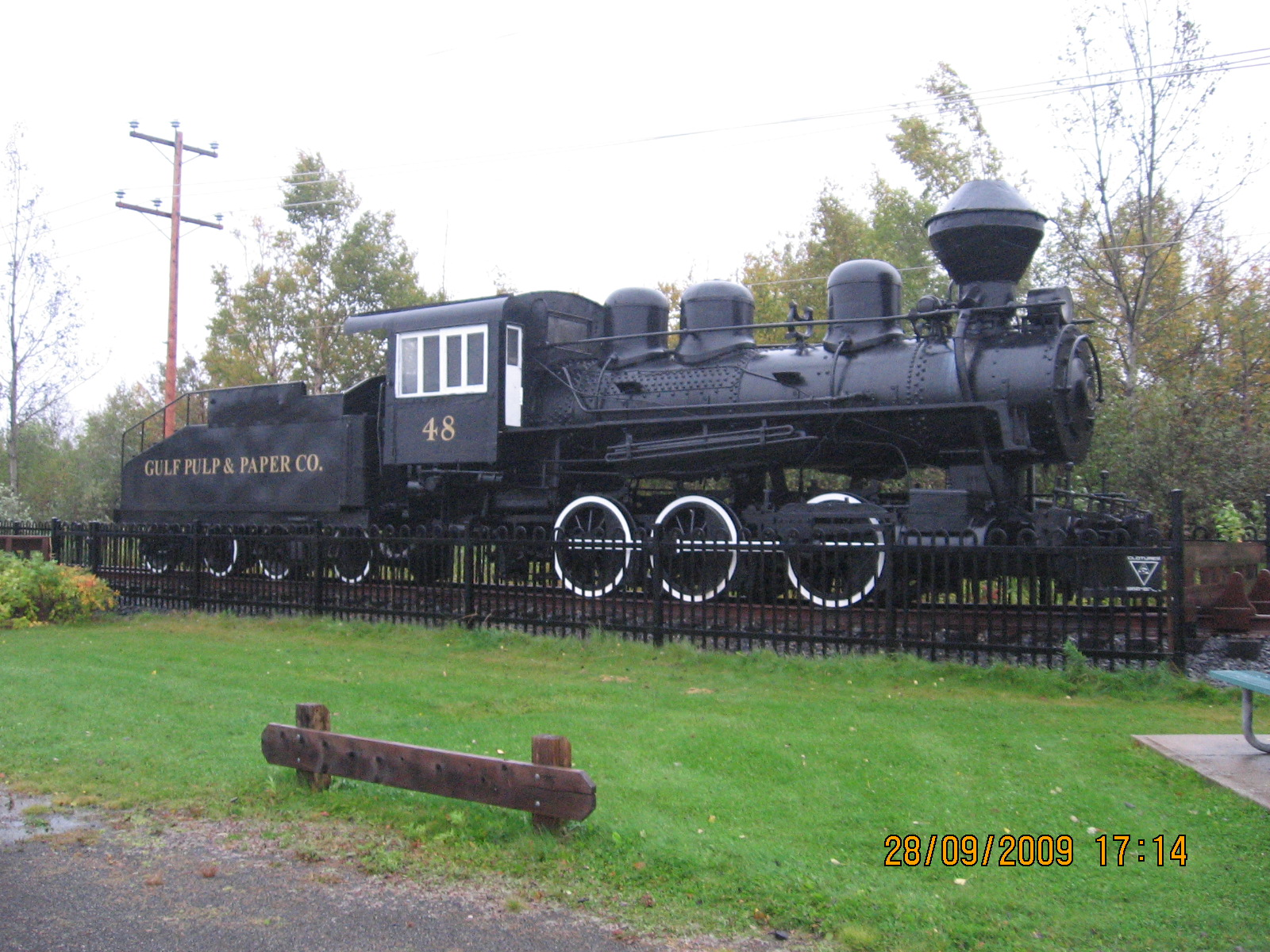
Gulf Pulp and Paper locomotive preserved at Clarke City

The brothers George, James, John and William Clarke, of New York and Toronto, were editors of the Century Dictionary and the Encyclopædia Britannica They visited the region at the end of the 19th century on a fishing expedition, at a time when only a few hunters and fishermen lived in the area. They returned early in the 20th century to investigate the potential for wood to supply paper for their publications. They found plentiful trees and a powerful river to supply power. The Chute d'Aval (Downstream Falls) was 7 kilometres (4.3 mi) from the Sainte-Marguerite River mouth, and the Chute d'Amont (Upstream Falls) was 10 kilometres (6.2 mi) from its mouth.

The Clarke brothers built a paper mill 7 kilometres (4.3 mi) from the mouth of the river between 1903 and 1908, and in 1908 inaugurated the first hydroelectric plant to supply electricity to the mill and to the nearby Clarke City. They also built a 12 kilometres (7.5 mi) railway to link the paper mill to Pointe-Noire, where they built a wharf. The train was owned by the North Shore Power Railway & Navigation Company, founded by the Clarke Brothers in 1902. The company was renamed the Gulf Pulp and Paper Co in 1914. It was bought out by British investors in 1920. The mill continued in operation until 1967. In 1968 Gulf Pulp and Paper sold the present dam to the Iron Ore Company (IOC).

=== Sainte-Marguerite-1 ===
Sainte-Marguerite-1 (SM-1) is located beside Clarke City. The present structure is a 30.5 MW hydroelectric facility owned by Innergex. It was commissioned in 1993 with one turbine, which supplied 8.5 MW. In 2002 two more turbines were added, bringing the plant up to its present capacity. The SM-IA expansion was commissioned in June 2002, adding two fully regulated 11 MW vertical Kaplan turbines to the existing Francis turbine. The river flow is regulated by the SM-3 generating station and reservoir 70 kilometres (43 mi) upstream, which came into service in Spring 2003. The plant was acquired by Innergex (50.1%) and Desjardins Group Pension Plan (49.99%) in 2014, and delivers power under contract to Hydro Quebec. Average annual output is 166,500 MWh.

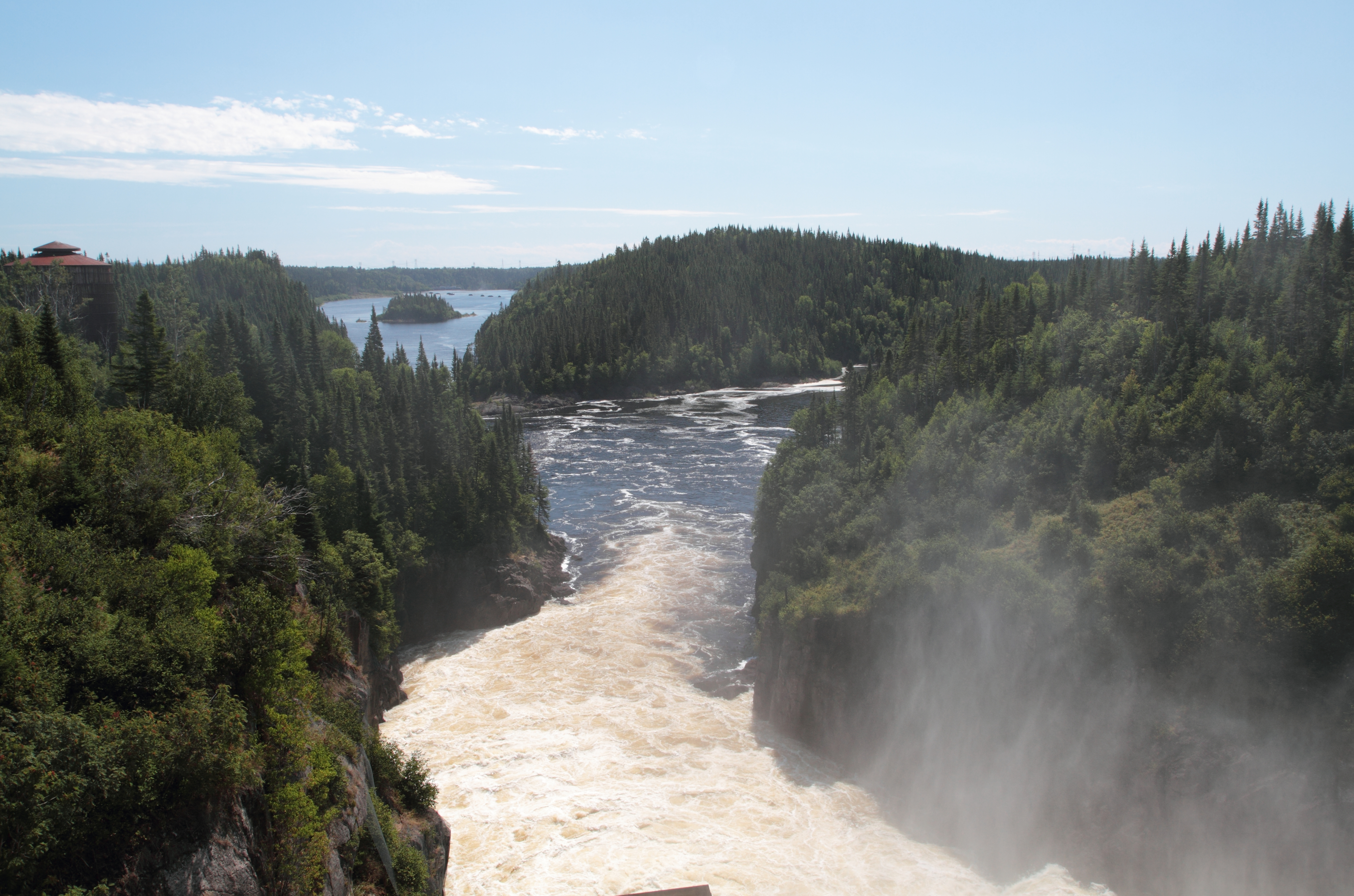
View downstream from Sainte-Marguerite-2 dam

=== Sainte-Marguerite-2 ===
The earth fill Sainte-Marguerite-2 dam is 9.3 metres (31 ft) high and impounds 230,800,000 cubic metres (8.15×10^{9} cu ft) of water. It was built in 1951. The reservoir is 10.40 square kilometres (4.02 sq mi), and the drainage basin is 6,130 square kilometres (2,370 sq mi). SM-2 is owned by Gulf Power, a subsidiary of IOC (now Rio Tinto). It was built for Gulf Pulp and Paper, and was commissioned in 1954. It produces 17.6 MW. Electricity was sent to Sept-Iles for IOC to process iron ore from Schefferville, and some was sold to the Sept-Îles Electricity Cooperative.

=== Sainte-Marguerite-3 ===
The Sainte-Marguerite-3 hydroelectric power station has a capacity of 882 MW. The 315 square kilometres (122 sq mi) canyon-type reservoir about 90 kilometres (56 mi) from the city of Sept-Iles was filled between 1998 and 2002. The Denis-Perron dam is 171 metres (561 ft) high, and the reservoir is 140 kilometres (87 mi) long. The depth near the toe of the dam is around 120 metres (390 ft). The reservoir induced some minor earthquakes. Another side effect, which had been anticipated, was a rise in mercury levels by factors of 6 to 8 in lake whitefish (Coregonus clupeaformis) and northern pike (Esox lucius), the main species of fish in the reservoir. Brook trout (Salvelinus fontinalis), the preferred fish for the local people, tend to avoid large reservoirs and were not affected. Mercury exposure to consumers stayed well below accepted levels.

== Lakes ==
Lakes to the west of the Sainte-Marguerite River include:

Lake	Coordinates	Map
Lac du Portage	50.2616°N 66.8311°W	EHSNH
Lac des Îles	50.2467°N 66.7642°W	EGSBM
Lac Brûlé	50.3497°N 66.7953°W	EFRLU
Lac à Charles	50.3989°N 66.6539°W	EFWCU
Lac Éden	50.4319°N 66.7475°W	EKMHR
Lac Denté	50.4508°N 66.6239°W	EKMIJ
Lac de la Coulée	50.4936°N 66.6241°W	EKMIK
Lac Picard	50.5983°N 66.7100°W	EHQEZ
Lac Doré	50.7350°N 66.8578°W	EKMJM
Lac à Moi	50.7569°N 66.9314°W	EIUFO
Lac à Toi	50.8103°N 66.9156°W	EITAU
Lac Hélène	50.7714°N 66.9736°W	EKMLW
Lac Cacaoui	50.8992°N 66.9681°W	EFSJR
Petit lac Cacaoui	50.8630°N 67.0442°W	EFSGK
Lac Sans Bout	50.8214°N 67.0031°W	EKMKP
Lac Gamache	51.0297°N 67.1161°W	EGLKY
Lac Garemand	51.1031°N 67.1997°W	EGLOM
Lac Houdan	51.2317°N 67.0772°W	EGREY
Lac Alexandre	51.3367°N 67.0456°W	EFHJO
Lac Muak	51.8675°N 67.1314°W	EJWGR
Lac de l'Oiseau	52.2444°N 67.2377°W	EHLSI

Lakes to the east of the Sainte-Marguerite River include:

Lake	Coordinates	Map
Lac Fox	50.3916°N 66.5675°W	EIPSW
Lac Curieux	50.4686°N 66.5116°W	EKMIH
Lac Interdit	50.6980°N 66.5477°W	EKMKO
Lac Lapointe	50.6792°N 66.6663°W	EKMKJ
Lac du Coin	50.7008°N 66.6306°W	EKMKG
Lac de l'Attrape	50.7447°N 66.6578°W	EKMKE
Lac au Poêlon	50.7311°N 66.7589°W	EHRSA
Lac Jourdain	50.7542°N 66.7353°W	EKMLC
Lac Daubigeon	51.1200°N 66.8475°W	EGCAK
Lac Boulé	51.2275°N 66.8436°W	EFPTE
Lac Demers	51.3175°N 66.8186°W	EGCQH
Lac Fouquet	51.4947°N 66.8775°W	EGJRV
Lac Boeste	51.9778°N 66.9658°W	EFOOX

== Sources ==
- Clarke City (in French), Commission de toponymie du Québec
- "Clarke City", GrandeQuebec (in French)
- "Foundateurs et Bâtisseurs de Clarke City", Waymarking
- Lamontagne, Maurice; Hammamji, Yousef; Tournier, Jean-Pierre; Woodgold, Catherine (2011), "Reservoir-induced earthquakes at Sainte-Marguerite-3, Quebec, Canada", Canadian Journal of Earth Sciences, 43: 135–146, doi:10.1139/e05-108
- "Le bassin versant de la rivière Sainte-Marguerite" (PDF), Archéologie de la Côte-Nord, Centre Archéo Topo
- Lykousis, Vasilios; Sakellariou, Dimitris; Locat, Jacques (14 September 2007), Submarine Mass Movements and Their Consequences: 3rd International Symposium, Springer Science & Business Media, ISBN 978-1-4020-6512-5
- madoray, Barrage Sainte-Marguerite 2
- Portrait préliminaire de la zone de gestion intégrée de l'eau par bassin versant Duplessis (PDF) (in French), OBV Duplessis, April 2015, archived from the original (PDF) on 2019-09-02
- Portrait régional de l’eau, Côte-Nord (Région administrative 09) (in French), Ministère de l'Environnement et de la Lutte contre les changements climatiques
- Répertoire des barrages X2083192 (in French), Ministère de l'Environnement et de la Lutte contre les changements climatiques
- Rivière Sainte-Marguerite (in French), Commission de toponymie du Québec
- Rivière Sainte-Marguerite (in French), Ressources naturelles Canada
- Sainte-Marguerite 1 A, Hydromega
- Saucier, J.-P.; Robitaille, A.; Grondin, P.; Bergeron, J.-F.; Gosselin, J. (2011), Les régions écologiques du Québec méridional (PDF) (map), 4 (in French), Ministère des Ressources naturelles et de la Faune, archived from the original (PDF) on 2020-06-19
- Schetagne, Roger; Plante, Michel; Castonguay, Daniel, Impact of the Sainte-Marguerite 3 Hydroelectric Reservoir on the Mercury Exposure of Local Fish Consumers (PDF), Hydro-Québec
- SM-1, Innergex
- "Zec Matimek", Avenza Maps (in French)
