= Zec Matimek =

- Location within Quebec
- Location: Canada, Quebec, Sept-Rivières Regional County Municipality
- Nearest city: Sept-Îles
- Coordinates: 50°36′00″N 66°44′00″W
- Area: 1,854 square kilometres (716 sq mi)
- Established: 1979
- Governing body: L'Association chasse et pêche Sept-Îlienne inc.

The ZEC Matimek is a "zone d'exploitation contrôlée" (controlled harvesting zone) (ZEC) in the unorganized territory of Lac-Walker, in the Sept-Rivières Regional County Municipality (MRC), in the administrative region of Côte-Nord, in Quebec, in Canada. Zec Matimek was created in 1979.

The "Association chasse et pêche Sept-Îlienne inc" is a non-profit organization that administers the land of Zec which are in the public domain. ZEC has a mission to develop the land and make it available to the public for outdoor activities including: hiking, quad/snowmobile, camping, hunting, fishing, watching scenery, flora and fauna.

== Geography ==
The territory of the ZEC Matimek covers an area of 1854 square kilometers on the Lower North Shore of the Gulf of St. Lawrence. Formed in length, ZEC extends around the Sainte-Marguerite River, north Port-Cartier and Sept-Îles. ZEC has more than 350 lakes within its territory, of which 25 are used for recreational fishing. Area lakes varies from 1-450 hectares.

Since 2001, an asphalt road network of 77 km allows users to access the northern part of the ZEC. This sector comprises three accommodation units located along new water bodies to accommodate vacationers, hunters and fishermen. ZEC also offers rental services for boats and camping.

The "Fédération québécoise de la montagne" (Quebec Federation of Mountain) recognized the Simon Proulx and "L'Escalier" peaks as icy peaks of world renown. These peaks are located at 10 km from the waterway to the St. Margaret River. On the territory of the ZEC, the outdoor enthusiasts can observe a variety of wildlife including: bald eagles, black bears, moose, porcupines, Canada geese, ducks, beavers and martens.

Major lakes of Zec are: Adrian, Andrew, Angel, Anne, Attacaupé, de l'Attrape (de Catcher), Brûlé, Cacaoui, Caribou, du Castor (Beaver), Catista, à Charles, Chétif (Puny), Claudette, du Coin (Corner), Contact, de la Coulée (of Coulee), Curieux (Curious), Curot, Denté (toothed), Doré (Golden), Dumais, Eden, Endormi (Asleep), des Feuilles (Leaves), Fox, Fretin (Minnow), Futura, Gagnon, Gamache, Hall, Hingan, Hélène (Helen), Interdit (Forbidden), des Îles (Islands), Jourdain (Jordan), Kim, Lachipu, Ladougas, Landry, Lapointe, de la Limite (the limit), à louer (Rentals), à Luc (Luke), à Moi (to me), Manitowik, Médallon, Ninnipuka, Nitro, Obscur, Ovide, Paquet, à la Pêche (Fisheries), Paul, Piace, Picard, au Poêlon (the skillet), du Portage, de la Rencontre, Rioux, Sans Bout, Secoué (Shaken), Sept-Milles (Seven Miles), Serpent (Snake), du Siffleux, Soulard, à Toi, Tommy, Tortillier Valin and Virgo.

The entrance station is located in the Hall sector. The journey to get there is to take the route 138. The entrance station is located 19 km west of Sept-Îles.

== Toponymy ==
The specific "Matimek" is associated with two names: ZEC Matimek and Mount Matimek (geographical coordinates: 50° 15' 29 "; 67° 01' 51"). The name "Zec Matimek" derives from the mountain of the same name. This mountain is located 10 km west of Zec, in the Réserve faunique de Port-Cartier–Sept-Îles (Wildlife Sanctuary Port-Cartier-Sept-Îles), 28.5 miles north of Port-Cartier between Chevarie Lake and Arsenault Lake.

The name "Zec Matimek" was formalized on August 5, 1982 at the Bank of place names in the Commission de toponymie du Québec (Geographical Names Board of Quebec).

== Hunting and Fishing ==
ZEC is home to a wide variety of wildlife that can be hunted. The hunting quotas are applicables for the black bear, the moose, the duck, the ruffed grouse, the grouse of Canada and the hare of America. The outdoor enthusiasts can observe the grouse and a variety of migratory birds.

As for recreational fishing, ZEC has 25 operated lakes allowing fishermen to catch the pike and brook trout.

The outdoor enthusiasts can practice in several ZEC favorite sports:

- Canoe Camping: including Hall Lake and the Sainte-Marguerite River. Soon, the ZEC plans to offer this activity in the North.
- Climbing: Climbing is practicable on the pillar Simon Proulx, which is located 10 km from the route 138 in the southern part of the ZEC Matimek.
- Dinghy: The boat is a practical activity including lakes Hall, Gamache, Helen, à Vous (to you), à Moi (to me) and Madonna.
- Kayak: The St. Margaret River is a favorable kayaking segment of about 60 km. * Trails for snowmobile and VTT.

== See also ==
- Lac-Walker, an unorganized territory
- Sept-Rivières Regional County Municipality (MRC)
- Côte-Nord, administrative region of Quebec
- Wildlife Sanctuary Port-Cartier-Sept-Îles
- Port-Cartier
- Sept-Îles
- zone d'exploitation contrôlée (Controlled Harvesting Zone) (ZEC)
