= Rimouski Aerodrome =

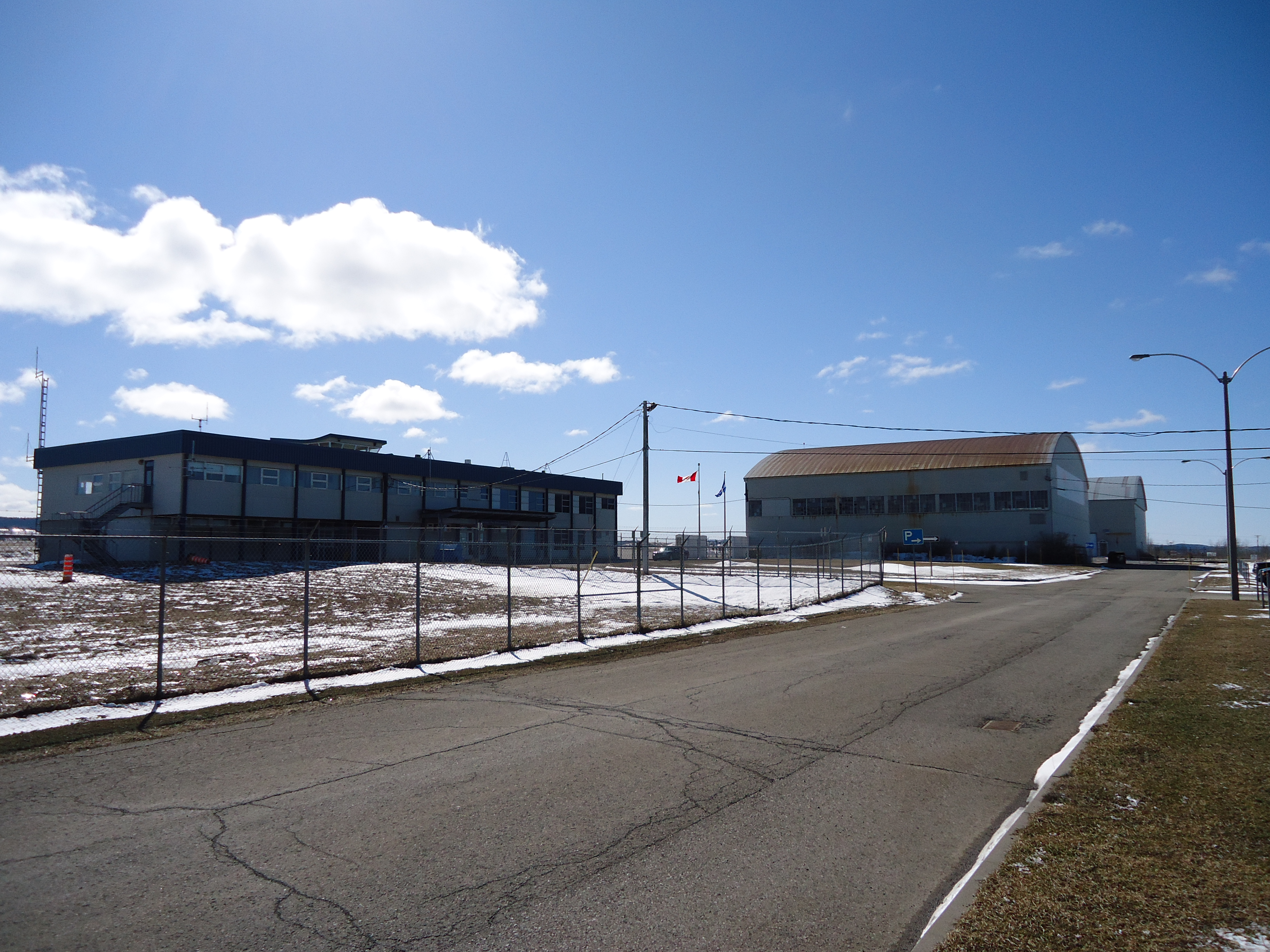
- IATA: YXK; ICAO: CYXK

Summary
- Airport type: Public
- Owner: City of Rimouski
- Operator: Municipality of Rimouski
- Serves: Rimouski, Bas-Saint-Laurent, Quebec
- Location: Rimouski, Quebec
- Time zone: EST (UTC−05:00)
  - Summer (DST): EDT (UTC−04:00)
- Elevation AMSL: 82 ft / 25 m
- Coordinates: 48°28′40″N 068°29′47″W
- Website: https://rimouski.ca/services/transports/aerodrome

Map
- Location in Quebec CYXK (Canada)

Runways
Direction	Length		Surface
Direction	ft	m	Surface
07/25	4,600	1,402	Asphalt

Statistics (2014-2018)
- Aircraft movements (annual avg.): 5,170
- Source: Canada Flight Supplement; Movements from Statistics Canada

Rimouski Aerodrome (IATA: YXK, ICAO: CYXK) is a registered aerodrome located 1.8 nautical miles (3.3 km; 2.1 mi) northeast of Rimouski, Quebec, Canada. It only handles general aviation and cargo flights.

== History ==
The aerodrome was constructed in 1927, when the Department of Defence constructed a terminal for the first aerial postal route in Canada. During the 1930s and 1940s, programs to combat unemployment during the Great Depression as well as defence requirements during the Second World War led to the expansion of the aerodrome. In 1946, the City of Rimouski started renting the aerodrome from the federal government. The civilian use of the field would contribute to the rise of Quebecair until 1969.

On 20 April 1999, Transport Canada awarded the airport certificate number 5151-1-Q208.

On 19 April 2002, the city acquired the airport from the federal government. Since then, the city has owned and operated the airport.

In 2017, the airport reverted to the status of registered aerodrome.

== Facilities ==
=== Operator ===
The aerodrome is owned and operated by the City / Municipality of Rimouski and is considered a registered aerodrome under Canadian Aviation Regulations.

Landing fees are charged. All single engine piston aircraft of less than 4,000 kg (8,800 lb) registered gross weight and privately registered aircraft (except air ambulance and aircraft over 15,000 kg [33,000 lb]) according to the Transport Canada civil register are exempt from these fees.

Outside parking fees are charged after 24 hours except for those who have a hangar storage lease. Hangar parking is available by monthly lease or without lease with different rates for resident and non-residents of the city. Flight schools are exempt from hangar fees. Plug-ins are available and billed based on amount of time used.

=== Services ===
==== Fuel ====
The aerodrome sells 100LL and Jet-A1 fuels.

==== Oils ====
All seasonal oils are available.

==== Servicing ====
Storage, parking and plug-ins are available, as well as a pilot lounge on request.

==== Ramp ====
The ramp is approximately 4,498 m^{2} (48,420 ft^{2}) in area.

=== Terminal ===
The Aérogare Paul-Emile-Lapointe is a 1,200 m^{2} (13,000 ft^{2}), two story terminal building which contains a common area, passenger waiting areas and administrative offices.

=== Hangars ===
Two hangars are located at the aerodrome, containing 3,200 m^{2} (34,000 ft^{2}) of storage space. These two hangars are linked by a 1,100 m^{2} (12,000 ft^{2}), two story building.

=== Runways ===
The aerodrome has an asphalt runway 4,600 by 150 ft (1,402 by 46 m), allowing it to accommodate turboprops as well as turbofan / turbojet aircraft with over 50 passengers and maximum takeoff weight (MTOW) over 23,000 kg (50,000 lb).

Runway 07 has right hand circuit traffic.

City staff provide a runway condition report. Pavement load ratings and pavement classification numbers are available.

=== Lighting ===
The runway is served by threshold lighting as well as low intensity runway lights activated by a Type J ARCAL system.

Both runways are also served by PAPIs.

=== Communication facilities ===
The aerodrome is surrounded by a 5 NM (9.3 km; 5.8 mi) mandatory frequency area served by the Mont-Joli Flight Service Station. This area is joined to the Mont-Joli mandatory frequency area by a corridor equal to the width of their diameter up to 3,200 ft (980 m) above sea level (ASL).

=== Navigation facilities ===
The aerodrome is served by the Rimouski non-directional beacon (NDB: identification: YXK, frequency: 373 kHz), and is in range of the Mont-Joli VOR/DME VHF omnidirectional range (VOR) with a distance measuring equipment (DME), (identification: YYY, frequency: 115.9 MHz).

==== Instrument approaches ====
- RNAV (GNSS) RWY 07
- RNAV (GNSS) RWY 25
- VOR/DME B

== Accidents and incidents ==
- On 29 May 1973, Douglas C-47A, CF-QB,B of Air Gaspé crashed on approach, killing all four people on board.
