= Clarke City, Quebec =

Clarke City (Paushtik^{u})
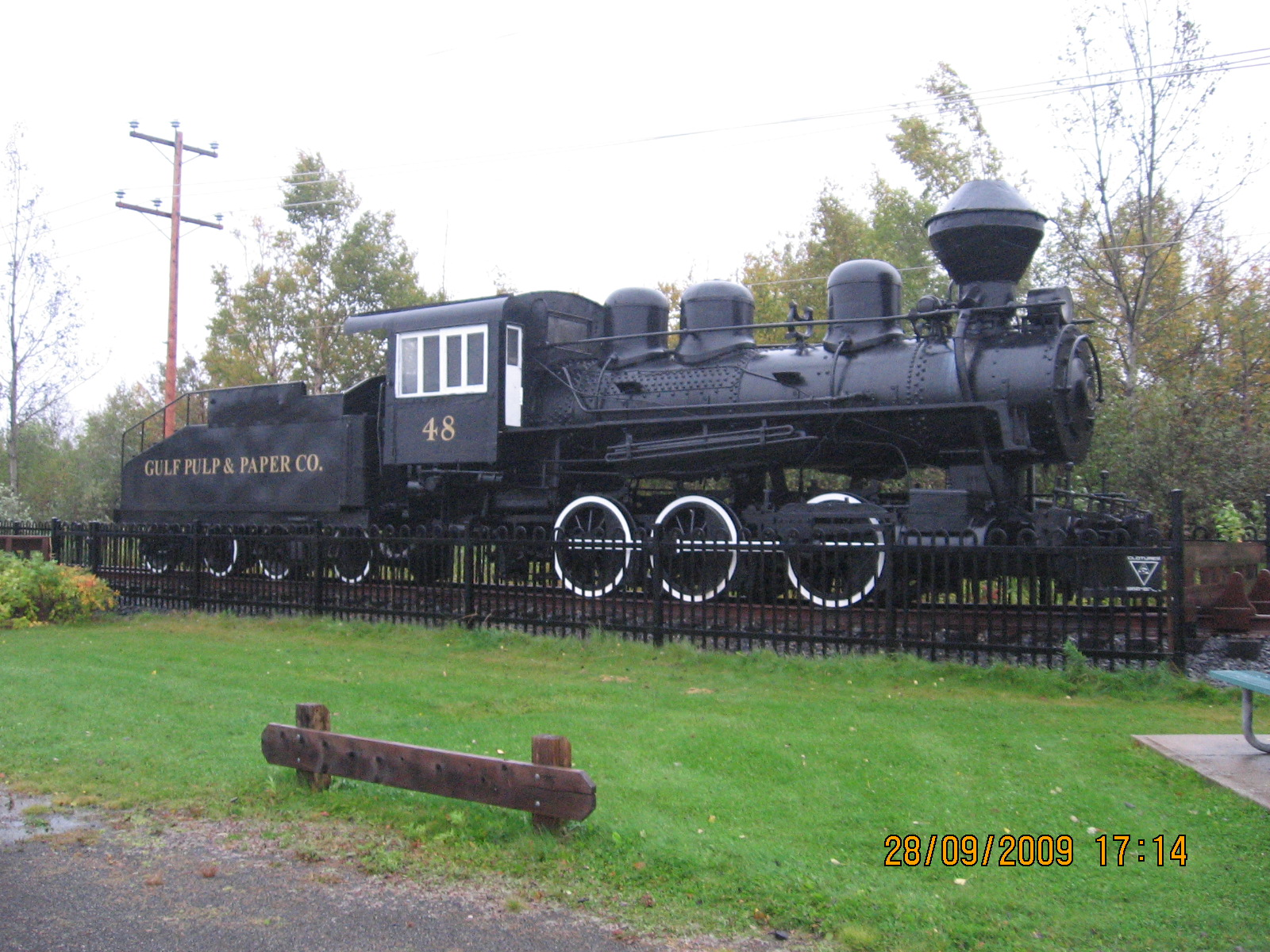
- Interactive map of Clarke City
- Coordinates: 50°11.5′N 66°38′W
- Country: Canada
- Province: Quebec
- Region: Côte-Nord
- Regional county: Sept-Rivières
- Municipality: Sept-Îles
- Time zone: UTC-5 (EST)

Clarke City, called Paushtik^{u} in the Innu language, is a community in the City of Sept-Îles, in the Quebec region of Côte-Nord. It is located roughly 20 kilometers west of the Sept-Îles city centre, on the Sainte-Marguerite River near Route 138. The name of the town originated from the Clarke brothers who established a paper mill there in 1903 to feed their publication house in Toronto. They also built a hydroelectric factory in 1908 and that year, the village was officially founded as the region's first closed city. The registers of the Saint-Cœur-de-Marie Parish also began that year, counting 400 persons in Clarke City.

The city was amalgamated into the city of Sept-Îles in 1970. It is now a sector in the western part of Sept-Îles.
