= Sept-Îles =

City in Quebec, Canada

- City
- City of Sept-Îles; Ville de Sept-Îles
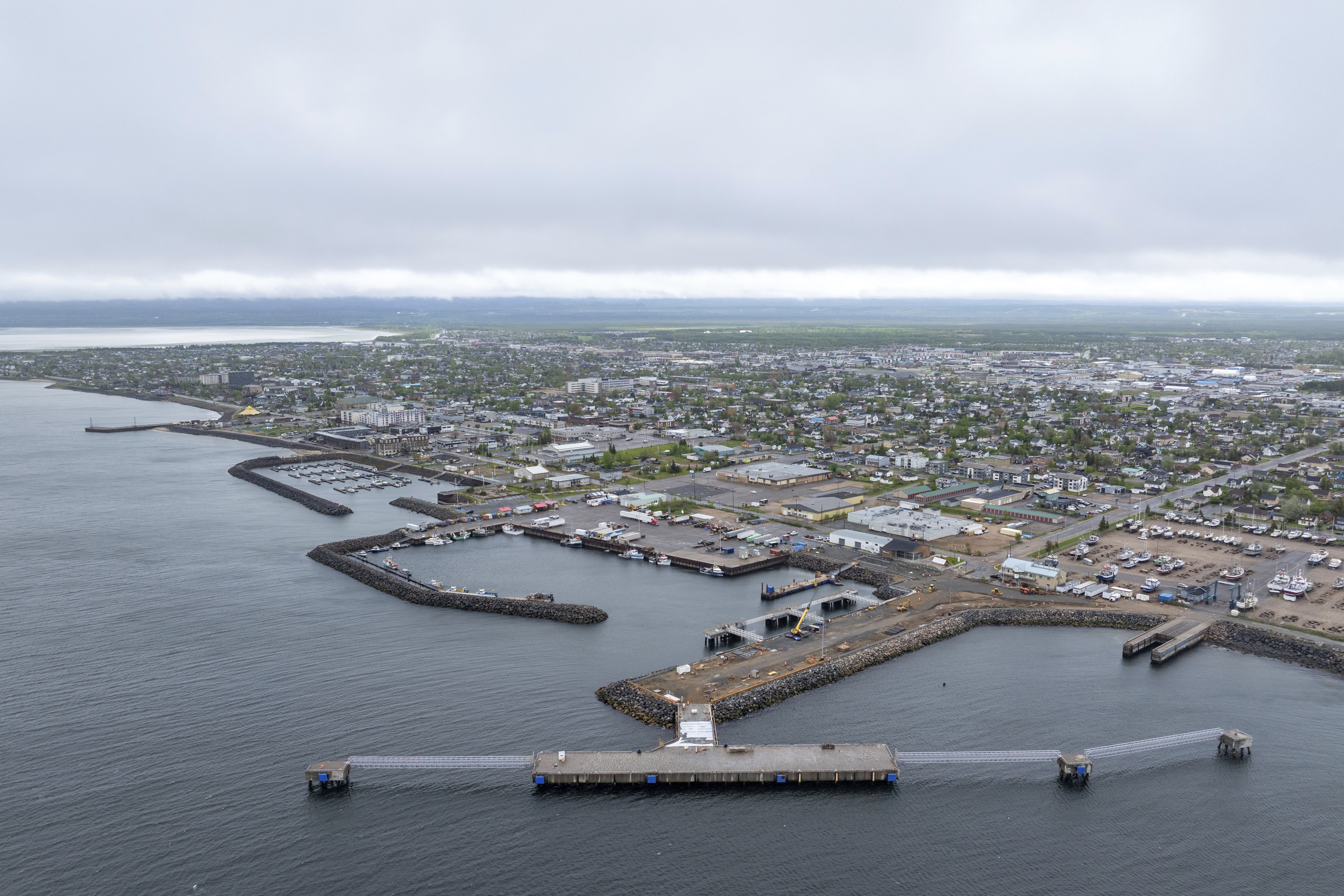
- Sept-Îles in 2026

- Coat of arms

- Location in Côte-Nord region of Quebec
- Coordinates: 50°13′N 66°23′W
- Country: Canada
- Province: Quebec
- Region: Côte-Nord
- RCM: Sept-Rivières
- Constituted: February 12, 2003

Government
  - Mayor: Benoit Méthot
  - Federal riding: Côte-Nord—Kawawachikamach—Nitassinan
  - Prov. riding: Duplessis

Area
  - Total: 2,172.22 km^{2} (838.70 sq mi)
  - Land: 1,742.88 km^{2} (672.93 sq mi)
  - Urban: 13.25 km^{2} (5.12 sq mi)
  - Metro: 1,750.44 km^{2} (675.85 sq mi)

Population (2021)
  - Total: 24,569
  - Density: 14.1/km^{2} (37/sq mi)
  - Urban: 21,352
  - Urban density: 1,612/km^{2} (4,180/sq mi)
  - Metro: 27,729
  - Metro density: 15.8/km^{2} (41/sq mi)
  - Pop (2016–21): ▼3.3%
  - Dwellings: 12,814
- Time zone: UTC−05:00 (EST)
  - Summer (DST): UTC−04:00 (EDT)
- Postal code(s): G4R, G4S
- Area codes: 418 and 581
- Highways: R-138
- Website: septiles.ca

Sept-Îles (French pronunciation: [sɛt il], locally [sɛˈt͡s‿ɪl], lit. 'Seven Islands') is a city in the Côte-Nord region of eastern Quebec. Along with Brador and Blanc-Sablon, Sept-Îles is one of the oldest places in the province. The population was 24,569 as of the 2021 Canadian census. The reserve is called Uashat, meaning "bay" in Innu-aimun.

The city is well known for having major iron companies like Iron Ore Company of Canada and SFP Pointe-Noire iron ore transport service company. The city relies heavily on the iron industry. Sept-Îles has among the highest average wages and the highest average wage increases.

It is among the northernmost places with a paved connection to the rest of Quebec's road network. The only settlements on the paved road network that are farther north are Fermont, Radisson and Chisasibi, the latter two of which are in the extreme western part of the province at the north end of the James Bay Road. The only other settlements at higher latitudes in the province are mostly isolated Cree, Innu, or Inuit villages, with access limited to seasonal gravel roads.

Sept-Îles is the seat of the judicial district of Mingan. The city is also home to the most highly attended recreational volleyball tournament in the province: the Tournoi Orange, which consists of 405 teams and close to 800 volleyball games.

== History ==
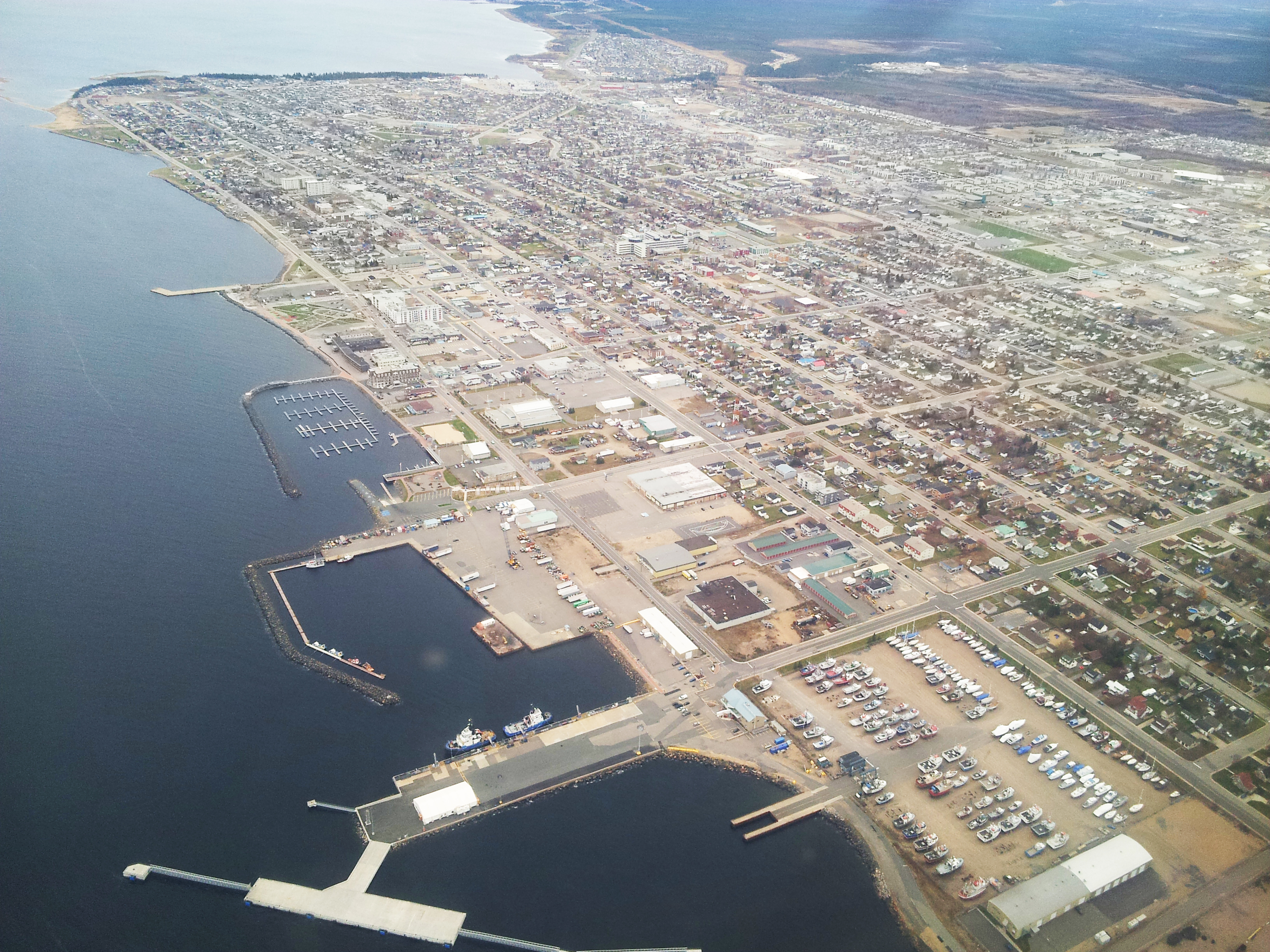
Sept-Îles in 2014

The first inhabitants of the area were varying cultures of aboriginal peoples. The Montagnais or Innu people, who call it Uashat ("Great Bay"), have lived there since before the time of European encounter. Jacques Cartier sailed by the islands in 1535 and made the first written record of them, calling them the Ysles Rondes ("Round Islands"). He was not the first European in the area, as he encountered Basque fishermen who came annually from Europe for whaling and cod fishing.

Early European economic activity in Sept-Îles was based on fishing and the fur trade. In 1650, Jean de Quen founded a mission there, called L'Ange- Gardien. By 1658, a fur trade post existed there, established by La Compagnie des Habitants, and Louis Jolliet established another trading post in 1679. Great Britain took over Canada from France in 1763 after its victory in the Seven Years' War, and in 1802, the North West Company (NWC) took over the post. When the North West Company and Hudson's Bay Company (HBC) merged in 1821, Sept Iles (also known as Seven Islands) became a HBC post. When its lease expired in 1822, it was closed. The post operated again from 1831 to 1859. The HBC opened a store in a new location in 1870.

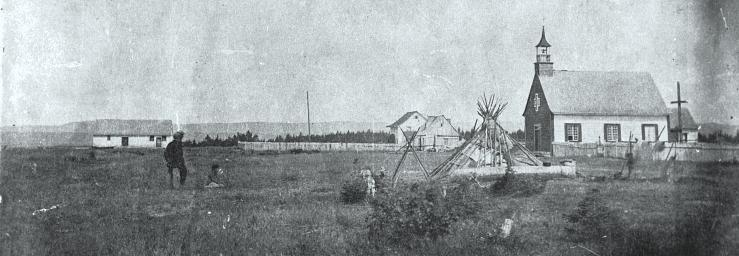
Sept-Iles in 1880

In 1875, the parish of Saint-Joseph-des-Sept-Îles was created, and in 1886, its post office opened under the English name "Seven Islands" (which was francized to "Sept-Îles" in 1933).

Lacking road access at the time, the town got its first pier in 1908. The City of Sept-Îles was incorporated in 1951, on the 300th anniversary of the first Catholic Mass held in the village.

The modern Sept-Îles was built rapidly during the construction of the Quebec North Shore and Labrador Railway, the 575 km (357 mi) railway link to the northern town of Schefferville. The railway was built between 1950 and 1954 by the Iron Ore Company of Canada. Iron ore mined near Schefferville and Wabush, Labrador, was transported on this railway and shipped from the Port of Sept-Îles. Shipment of the important new commodity resulted in investments that turned this into a major port. In 1952, the HBC built a new store, which was extended in 1954, and expanded with a groceteria in 1956 and a distribution warehouse in 1959.

With the iron ore business, the Sept-Îles deep-water seaport was second in Canada only to Vancouver in terms of yearly tonnage. The huge engineering project led to a major increase in population, and housing was quickly built to accommodate them. The town grew from 2,000 inhabitants in 1951 to 14,000 in 1961, and 31,000 in 1981. The decline in worldwide iron ore prices in recent decades has since caused employment and population to decrease. On January 11, 1986, the HBC store closed.

During the early 1990s, some new jobs accompanied the construction and operation of the new Aluminerie Alouette inc. aluminum processing plant. Construction for Phase 1 began in September 1989, and operation started in 1992. Construction of Phase 2 began in 2003.

In February 2003, the city amalgamated with the municipalities of Gallix and Moisie. The city includes the neighbourhoods of Arnaud, Clarke-City, De Grasse, de la Pointe, de la Rivière, Ferland, La Boule, Lac Labrie, Matamec, Plages, Pointe-Noire and Val-Marguerite.

== Geography ==
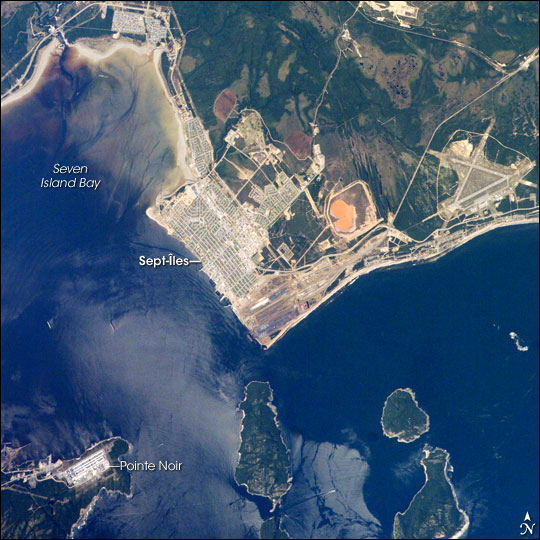
Satellite view of Sept-Îles

Located on the north shore of the Saint Lawrence River, between the Sainte-Marguerite and Moisie rivers, Sept-Îles lies on the shore of a deep-water bay fronted by a seven-island archipelago, about 230 kilometres (140 mi) east of Baie-Comeau. The bay constitutes a 45 square kilometres (17 sq mi) natural harbour.

The seven islands referred to in its name are named:

- La Grosse Boule ("the big ball")
- La Petite Boule ("the small ball")
- La Grande Basque ("the large Basque", named after the visiting Basque fishermen)
- La Petite Basque ("the small Basque")
- Île Manowin (from the Montagnais manouane meaning "where eggs are picked")
- Île du Corossol (named after the French ship Corossol wrecked on the island in 1693; site of a lighthouse and a bird sanctuary)
- Îlets Dequen (a group of tiny islands named after Jean de Quen who founded the local Catholic mission in 1650)

The archipelago is under provincial jurisdiction, with some parts administered by the federal government or by individuals.

There are two First Nations reserves in the area: Uashat in the western city proper, and Maliotenam in the east near the Moisie River.

=== Climate ===
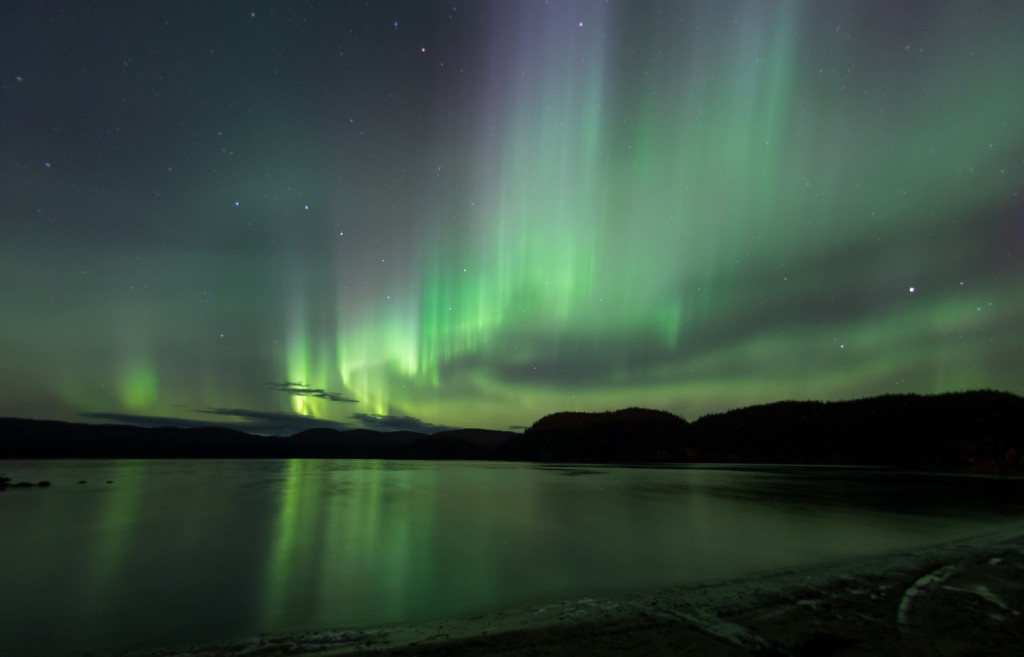
Northern lights at the Lac des Rapides.

Sept-Îles has a subarctic climate (Köppen climate classification Dfc) bordering on a humid continental climate (Dfb) despite being located at around only 50 degrees latitude. The two main seasons are summer and winter, as spring and autumn are very short transition seasons lasting only a few weeks. Winters are long, very cold, and snowy, lasting from late October to late April, but milder than more inland locations, with a January high of −9.8 °C (14.4 °F) and a January low of −20.9 °C (−5.6 °F). Overall precipitation is unusually high for a subarctic climate, and snow totals correspondingly heavy, averaging 384.6 cm (151.4 in) per season, with an average depth of 16 cm (6.3 in) annually or 37.6 cm (14.8 in) from December to April inclusive. Summers are mildly warm, with a July high of 19.6 °C (67.3 °F); summers thus display stronger maritime influence than do winters. Precipitation is significant year-round, but it is lowest from January to March.

The highest temperature ever recorded in Sept-Îles was 37.4 °C (99.3 °F) on 18 June 2020. The coldest temperature ever recorded was −45.6 °C (−50.1 °F) on 29 January 1913. The coldest temperature was recorded at Clarke City, which was the primary weather station for the area until records began at Sept-Îles Airport in September 1944.

Climate data for Sept-Îles (Sept-Îles Airport) Climate ID: 7047910; coordinates 50°13′N 66°16′W; elevation: 54.9 m (180 ft); 1991−2020 normals, extremes 1903−present (Note: Extreme high and low temperatures were recorded in Clarke City from May 1903 to August 1944, and at Sept-Îles Airport from September 1944 to present.)
Month	Jan	Feb	Mar	Apr	May	Jun	Jul	Aug	Sep	Oct	Nov	Dec	Year
Record high humidex	9.4	8.9	14.9	19.6	29.6	39.2	35.4	33.4	32.0	25.0	17.5	7.9	39.2
Record high °C (°F)	10.0 (50.0)	10.6 (51.1)	16.4 (61.5)	20.1 (68.2)	28.3 (82.9)	36.6 (97.9)	32.2 (90.0)	31.1 (88.0)	29.4 (84.9)	22.7 (72.9)	16.9 (62.4)	9.4 (48.9)	36.6 (97.9)
Mean maximum °C (°F)	1.8 (35.2)	1.5 (34.7)	6.6 (43.9)	11.9 (53.4)	20.4 (68.7)	25.3 (77.5)	26.1 (79.0)	25.6 (78.1)	22.6 (72.7)	16.2 (61.2)	9.6 (49.3)	4.4 (39.9)	27.4 (81.3)
Mean daily maximum °C (°F)	−8.9 (16.0)	−7.4 (18.7)	−1.9 (28.6)	4.1 (39.4)	10.9 (51.6)	16.7 (62.1)	19.7 (67.5)	19.5 (67.1)	14.8 (58.6)	8.4 (47.1)	1.7 (35.1)	−4.9 (23.2)	6.1 (43.0)
Daily mean °C (°F)	−14.5 (5.9)	−13.4 (7.9)	−7.3 (18.9)	−0.1 (31.8)	6.0 (42.8)	11.6 (52.9)	15.1 (59.2)	14.6 (58.3)	9.8 (49.6)	4.3 (39.7)	−2.3 (27.9)	−9.6 (14.7)	1.2 (34.2)
Mean daily minimum °C (°F)	−20.1 (−4.2)	−19.4 (−2.9)	−12.7 (9.1)	−4.4 (24.1)	1.1 (34.0)	6.5 (43.7)	10.3 (50.5)	9.6 (49.3)	4.8 (40.6)	0.1 (32.2)	−6.3 (20.7)	−14.3 (6.3)	−3.7 (25.3)
Mean minimum °C (°F)	−32.7 (−26.9)	−32.0 (−25.6)	−27.0 (−16.6)	−13.8 (7.2)	−4.3 (24.3)	−0.4 (31.3)	5.2 (41.4)	3.7 (38.7)	−2.0 (28.4)	−7.5 (18.5)	−17.6 (0.3)	−27.3 (−17.1)	−34.1 (−29.4)
Record low °C (°F)	−43.3 (−45.9)	−38.3 (−36.9)	−32.8 (−27.0)	−26.4 (−15.5)	−11.7 (10.9)	−3.3 (26.1)	1.7 (35.1)	−1.0 (30.2)	−6.5 (20.3)	−13.3 (8.1)	−28.9 (−20.0)	−36.5 (−33.7)	−43.3 (−45.9)
Record low wind chill	−53.7	−49.6	−43.9	−32.1	−18.6	−6.0	0.0	0.0	−8.0	−18.0	−32.9	−47.7	−53.7
Average precipitation mm (inches)	77.3 (3.04)	59.7 (2.35)	74.1 (2.92)	75.7 (2.98)	85.6 (3.37)	86.9 (3.42)	103.2 (4.06)	85.6 (3.37)	106.9 (4.21)	118.3 (4.66)	112.2 (4.42)	92.0 (3.62)	1,077.4 (42.42)
Average rainfall mm (inches)	13.4 (0.53)	10.0 (0.39)	18.1 (0.71)	42.3 (1.67)	—	—	—	—	—	—	67.6 (2.66)	27.8 (1.09)	—
Average snowfall cm (inches)	82.2 (32.4)	57.2 (22.5)	61.8 (24.3)	36.5 (14.4)	—	—	—	—	—	—	42.7 (16.8)	78.1 (30.7)	—
Average precipitation days (≥ 0.2 mm)	16.4	13.8	13.9	12.3	13.7	13.2	15.7	14.2	14.3	15.8	15.2	15.5	174.0
Average rainy days (≥ 0.2 mm)	2.3	1.4	3.4	6.9	—	—	—	—	—	—	8.6	3.6	—
Average snowy days (≥ 0.2 cm)	15.0	12.0	11.7	7.3	—	—	—	—	—	—	8.0	13.6	—
Average relative humidity (%) (at 1500 LST)	64.4	61.2	63.2	64.7	65.3	67.5	71.8	71.5	70.9	71.0	72.4	71.3	67.9
Average dew point °C (°F)	−18.5 (−1.3)	−17.6 (0.3)	−11.8 (10.8)	−5.4 (22.3)	0.8 (33.4)	6.7 (44.1)	11.4 (52.5)	11.1 (52.0)	6.6 (43.9)	0.7 (33.3)	−5.4 (22.3)	−12.7 (9.1)	−2.8 (27.0)
Mean monthly sunshine hours	104.0	134.4	150.8	170.1	223.4	221.2	240.9	220.4	154.0	131.2	93.5	93.7	1,937.6
Source 1: Environment and Climate Change Canada (sun)
Source 2: weatherstats.ca (for dewpoint and monthly/yearly average absolute maximum/minimum temperature)

== Demographics ==
Historical Census Data - Sept-Îles, Quebec

Year	Pop.	±%
1951	1,866	—
1956	5,592	+199.7%
1961	14,196	+153.9%
1966	18,950	+33.5%
1971	24,320	+28.3%
1976	30,617	+25.9%
1981	29,262	−4.4%
1986	25,637	−12.4%

Year	Pop.	±%
1991	24,848	−3.1%
1996	25,224	+1.5%
2001	23,791	−5.7%
2006	25,514	+7.2%
2011	25,686	+0.7%
2016	25,400	−1.1%
2021	24,569	−3.3%

Population counts are not adjusted for boundary changes and mergers.
Source: Statistics Canada

In the 2021 Census of Population conducted by Statistics Canada, Sept-Îles had a population of 24,569, living in 11,272 of its 12,814 total private dwellings, a change of -3.3% from its 2016 population of 25,400. With a land area of 1,742.88 km^{2} (672.93 sq mi), it had a population density of 14.1/km^{2} (36.5/sq mi) in 2021.

At the Census Agglomeration level in the 2021 census, the agglomeration of Sept-Îles (consisting of Sept-Îles, Maliotenam, and Uashat) had a population of 27,729, living in 12,293 of its 13,878 total private dwellings, a change of -2.8% from its 2016 population of 28,534. With a land area of 1,750.44 km^{2} (675.85 sq mi), it had a population density of 15.8 people/km^{2} (41 people/mi^{2}) in 2021.

In 2021, the median age was 44.4, and French was the mother tongue of 92.5% of residents. The next most common mother tongues were English at 2.8%, followed by Innu at 1.4%. 1.1% reported both English and French as their first language. Additionally there were 0.4% who reported both French and a non-official language as their mother tongue.

As of 2021, Indigenous peoples comprised 4.2% of the population, mostly First Nations, and visible minorities accounted for 2.4%. The largest visible minority groups in Sept-Îles were Black (0.9%), Filipino (0.4%), and Latin American (0.3%). The area was home to 170 recent immigrants (i.e. those arriving between 2016 and 2021), who comprised about 0.7% of the total population. 105 of them were from various African countries.

In 2021, 70.4% of the population identified as Catholic, while 22.5% said they had no religious affiliation. Muslims were the largest religious minority, making up 0.8% of the population.

Canada Census Mother Tongue - Sept-Îles, Quebec
Census	Total	French			English			French & English			Other		
Year	Responses	Count	Trend	Pop %	Count	Trend	Pop %	Count	Trend	Pop %	Count	Trend	Pop %
2011	25,295	23,875	▲1.7%	94.39%	745	▼2.0%	2.94%	160	▲3.1%	0.63%	515	▼36.8%	2.04%
2006	25,190	23,460	▲5.1%	93.13%	760	▼3.2%	3.02%	155	▼34.0%	0.62%	815	▲57.7%	3.23%
2001	23,630	22,265	▼5.9%	94.22%	785	▼11.3%	3.32%	235	▲40.4%	0.99%	345	▼4.2%	1.46%
1996	25,040	23,655	n/a	94.47%	885	n/a	3.53%	140	n/a	0.56%	360	n/a	1.44%

== Economy ==
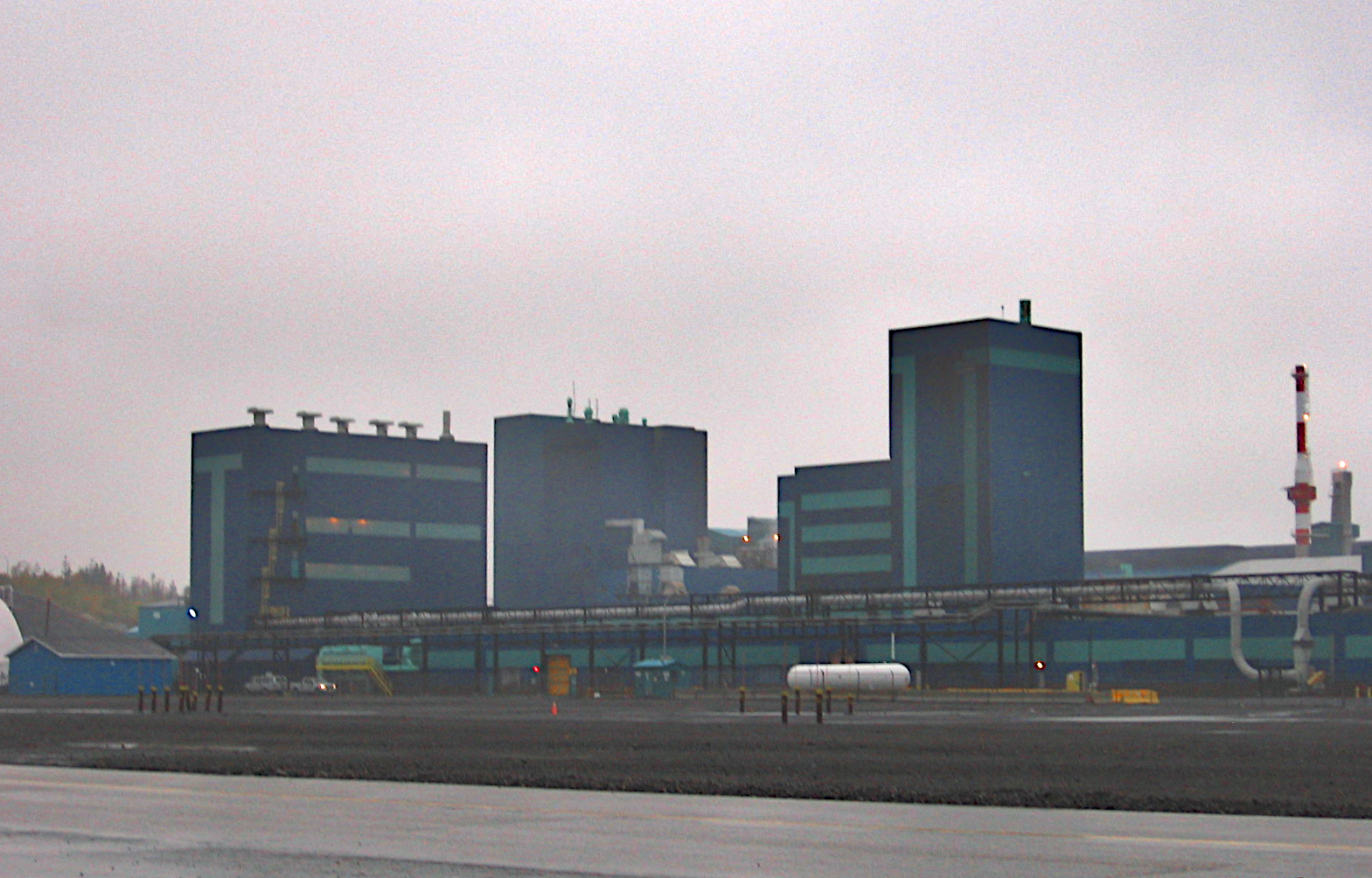
Aluminerie Alouette inc.

Iron ore concentrate from IOC activities in Labrador City are transported by the Quebec North Shore and Labrador Railway and are shipped to many markets around the world from Sept-Îles port facilities. Iron ore from Wabush and Bloom Lake is also shipped at Point Noire port facilities. The Aluminerie Alouette, in activity since 1992, has a large part in the local employment since construction started in 1989. Since its major expansion that started in 2005, it is now the largest primary aluminum smelter in the Americas. As a service centre for northeastern Québec, Sept-Îles economy is also powered by many jobs in the services sector.

Prior to its disestablishment, Air Gaspé was headquartered in Sept-Îles.

== Tourism ==
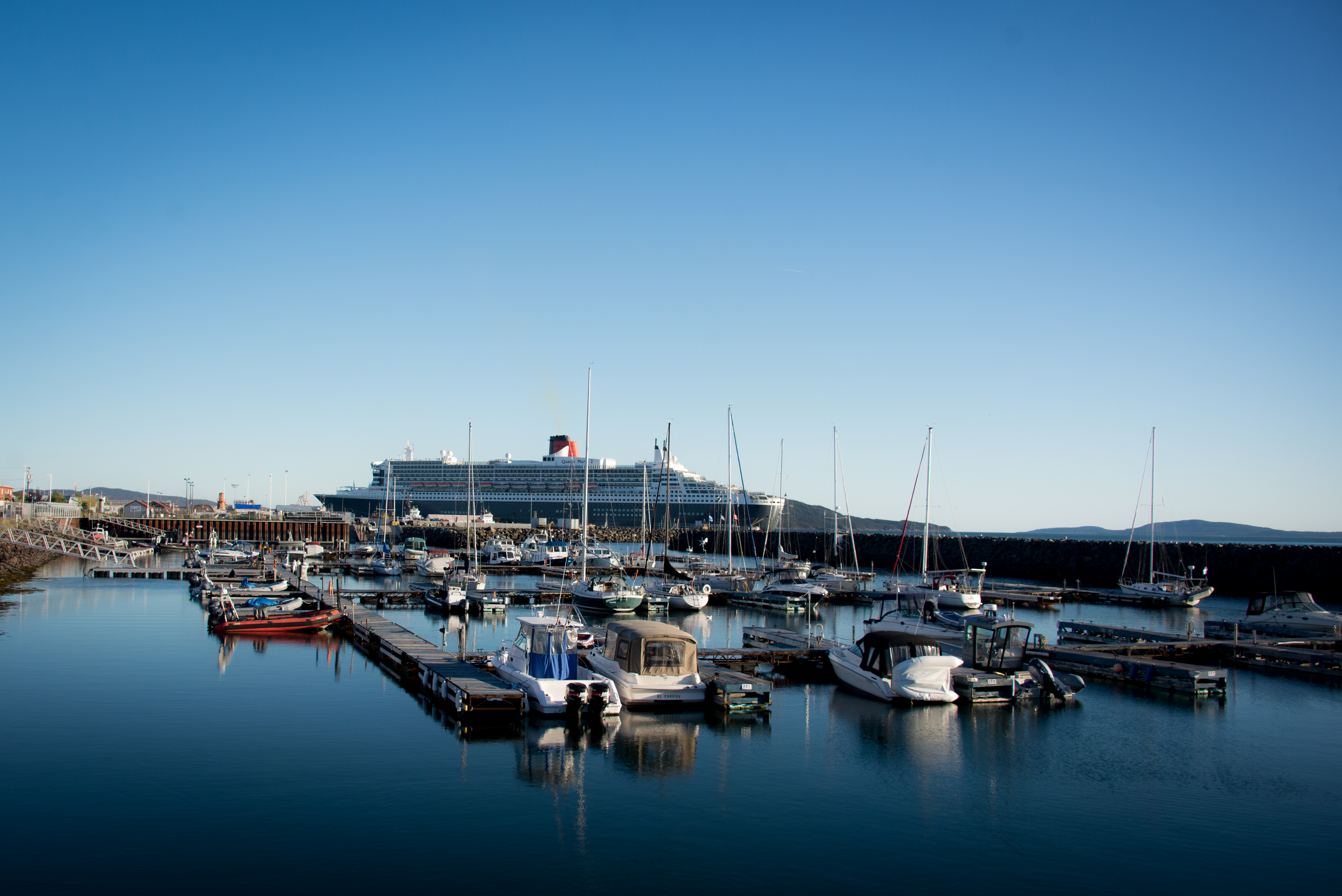
RMS Queen Mary 2 during her maiden call on October 2nd 2017

Since 2009, Sept-Îles has been part of the Saint-Laurent destination circuit, which has nine international cruise ports. On a larger scale, an alliance is being created with other ports in northeastern America and Canada under the auspices of Canada New England. The international cruises in Sept-Îles are led by the non-profit organization Destination Sept-Îles Nakauinanu.M The organization's mission is to enable the various public and private bodies to enjoy a permanent structure, in the form of a one-stop shop, enabling them to work jointly on the development and promotion of the City of Sept-Îles and from its surroundings to international cruise lines. The main partners involved in the development of international cruises are the city of Sept-Îles, the Port of Sept-Îles, the and Innu Takuaikan Uashat Mak Mani-Utenam.

As of 2018, more than 55,000 international visitors have visited the port of call. Cunard, P & O Cruises, Cruise and Maritime Voyages, Phoenix Reisen, Holland America Line, Oceania Cruises, Regent Seven Seas, Silversea, Saga Cruises, Crystal Cruises, Norwegian Cruise Line, Pearl Seas Cruises and Transocean Tours are among the clients of the port. On September 7, 2019, when Royal Caribbean Line made its maiden call overnight, this was a safe haven for avoiding Hurricane Dorian.

== Transportation ==
The Sept-Îles Airport has connections all over Quebec and Labrador. General aviation seaplanes are served by Sept-Îles/Lac Rapides Water Aerodrome. Air Gaspé was based in Sept-Îles, but acquired by Quebecair in 1973. In the 1980s, continued airline restructuring led to Quebecair's being acquired by CP Air in 1986, which in turn was taken over by Canadian Airlines in 1987 and then Air Canada in 2001. PAL Airlines, Air Inuit, Central Mountain Air and Air Liaison offer daily routes between Montréal, Québec and Sept-Îles.

Tshiuetin Rail Transportation also operates a passenger rail service north to Emeril, Labrador (near Labrador City) which continues northward towards its terminus in Schefferville, Quebec.

Groupe Desgagnés operates the Bella Desgagnés passenger and cargo ship along the lower St. Lawrence from Rimouski to Blanc-Sablon from mid-April to mid-January.

== Media ==
=== Radio ===
- FM 90.1 - CKAU-FM-1, First Nations community radio (rebroadcasts CKAU-FM Maliotenam)
- FM 94.1 - CKCN-FM, contemporary hit radio
- FM 96.1 - CBRX-FM-2, Ici Musique (rebroadcasts CBRX-FM Rimouski)
- FM 96.9 - CBSE-FM, CBC Radio One (rebroadcasts CBVE-FM Quebec City)
- FM 98.1 - CBSI-FM, Ici Radio-Canada Première
- FM 99.1 - CIPC-FM, soft rock

=== Television ===
All terrestrial television stations in the Sept-Îles area are repeaters of stations and networks that originate elsewhere. These stations are available on the Cogeco cable system, which also offer a local cable channel, TVCogeco. The local Cogeco system also carries CBMT-DT (CBC) Montreal and CJBR-DT (Ici Radio-Canada Télé) Rimouski.

Sept-Îles is not designated as a mandatory market for digital television conversion; only CFTF-TV and Télé-Québec announced their intentions to convert all their transmitters to digital, regardless of location.

- Channel 5 / DT 20 - CFER-TV-2, TVA (rebroadcasts CFER-TV Rimouski)
- Channel 7 / PSIP 7 - CFTF-DT-7, V (rebroadcasts CFTF-DT Rivière-du-Loup)
- Channel 9 / PSIP 9 - CIVG-DT, Télé-Québec (rebroadcasts CIVM-DT Montreal)

== Notable people ==
- Robert Michael Ballantyne, former-explorer who traded furs
- Pierre Bourgault, Political activist and pioneer of the Quebec separatist movement tried to be elected in the Sept-Îles provincial district (Duplessis)
- Guy Carbonneau, Hall of Fame, former NHL defensive forward, former coach with the Montreal Canadiens
- Karen Cliche, actress
- Louis-Jean Cormier, vocalist and guitarist of the band Karkwa
- Henry de Puyjalon, (1841–1905) scientist, pioneer in ecology
- Pierre Duchesne, ex-Lieutenant Governor of Quebec did his notary career in Sept-Îles
- Steve Duchesne, former NHL defenceman
- Karl Dykhuis, former NHL defenceman
- Louis Jolliet, explorer
- Guillaume LeBlanc, Olympic silver medalist in walking
- Claude McKenzie, singer-songwriter and member of the group Kashtin
- Bruno Pauletto, physiologist, athlete, businessman, coach, author
- Myriam Sirois, actress
- Denis Thériault, author, playwright and screenwriter
- Florent Vollant, singer-songwriter and member of the group Kashtin
- Rob Zettler, former NHL defenceman

== See also ==
- COGEMA

== Notes and references ==
- Dredge, L. A. Surficial Geology of the Sept-Îles Area, Quebec North Shore. Ottawa, Canada: Geological Survey of Canada, 1983.
- Faessler, Carl. Sept-Îles Area, North Shore of St. Lawrence, Saguenay County. Québec: Dept. of Mines, Division of Geological Surveys, 1942.
