= Île aux Oeufs =

Island in Canada

Île aux Œufs
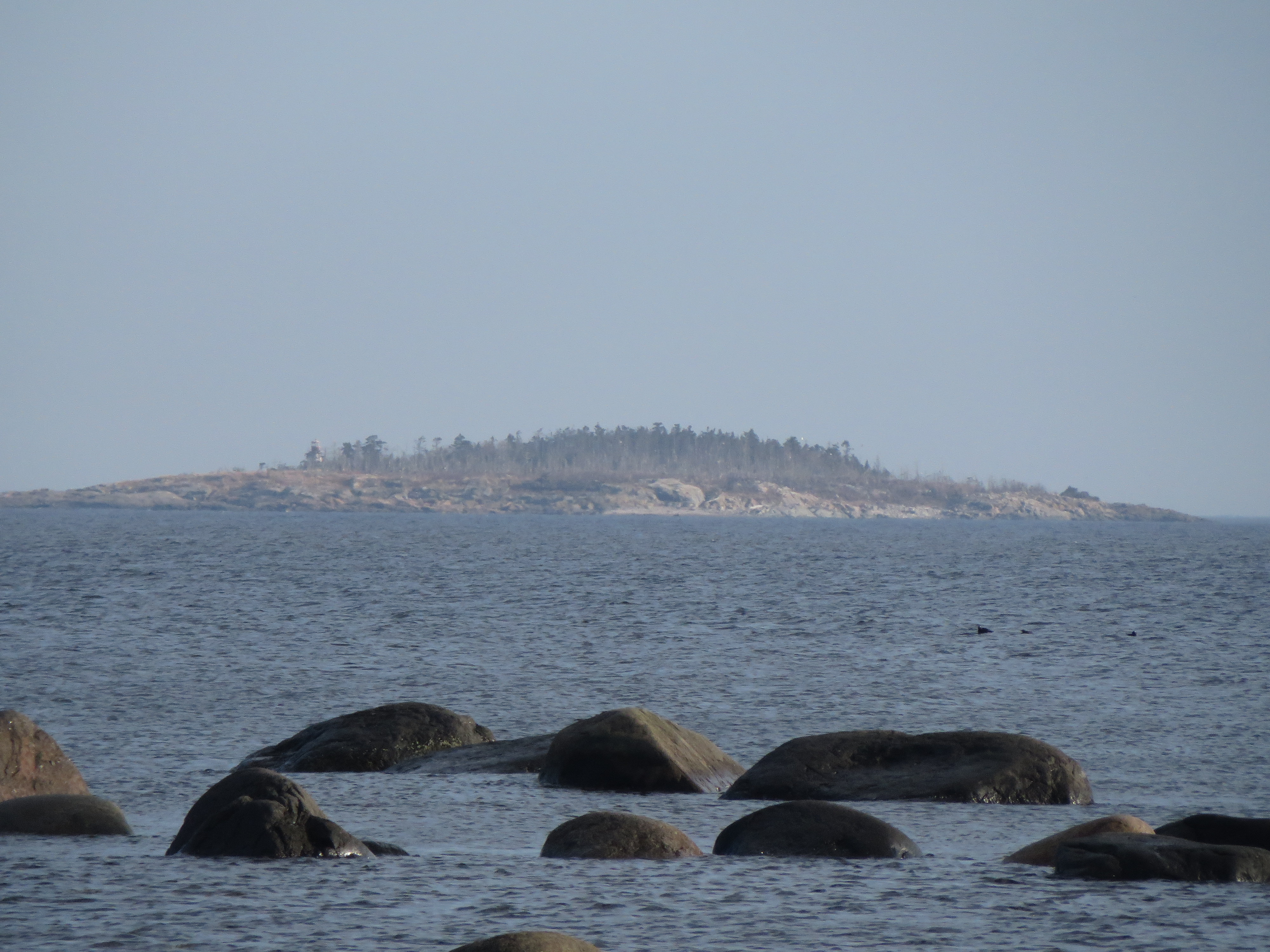
- Île aux Œufs as seen from Pointe-aux-Anglais

- Islands of Canada

Geography
- Location: St. Lawrence River
- Coordinates: 49.626281°N 67.175543°W
- Type: Île continentale
- Area: 0.19 km^{2} (0.073 sq mi)
- Highest point: 10 m

Administration
- Canada
- Sept-Rivières
- Largest settlement: Port-Cartier

Demographics
- Population: No residents

Additional information
- Time zone: UTC-5

Île aux Œufs (lit. 'Egg Island') is an island on the north shore of St. Lawrence River located in Port-Cartier, Quebec, Canada. It is a 19-hectare rocky island resting on a Precambrian bedrock, located two kilometers east of the mainland shore, about five kilometers from the hamlet of Pointe-aux-Anglais and forty kilometers from Pointe-des-Monts. It is mainly covered in balsam fir and includes the fourth-largest colony of common eiders in the St. Lawrence Estuary, as well as a colony of Double-crested Cormorants.

In 1711, the island's reefs witnessed the sinking of the Walker expedition, in which 900 of Admiral Hovenden Walker's 12,000 men perished, putting an end to the British attempt to invade New France. In 1871, the Ministère de la Marine et des Pêches built a lighthouse and was replaced in 1955, automated in 1970 and finally closed in 2003.

== Geography ==
=== Location ===
Île aux Œufs is a Canadian islet in the southern part of the province of Quebec, about 433 kilometers as the crow flies northeast of Quebec City. Approximately 2.4 kilometers east. of the north shore of the St. Lawrence River, it belongs administratively to the city of Port-Cartier, 5 kilometers south of Pointe-aux-Anglais. With a surface area of around 18.7 hectares, it stretches 1.4 kilometers from north to south and 400 meters from west to east

=== Geology and relief ===
Île aux Œufs is a permanent island with a flat topography and rocky coastline, no point of an altitude higher than 10 metres. It is surrounded by shoals and reefs, including Caye à Gagné and Recifs aux Cormorans, both located to the north of the island

At high tide, the two small beaches on either side of the island are submerged, leaving the island as a string of rocky islets, only two of which are vegetated.

The island's substratum is composed of Precambrian granite.

=== Climate ===
Île aux Œufs has a subhumid subpolar climate, characterized by an average growing season. The average temperature is 12.5 °C in summer and −12.5 °C in winter. Annual precipitation is around 1,000 millimeters.

== Toponymy ==
Attested as far back as the early 17th century, the island's name derives from the numerous species of birds that nest here in summer. Its first mention appears on a map by Jean Guérard in 1631 as "l. aux Ceufr". The toponym took its present form on a map by Jean-Baptiste-Louis Franquelin in 1678.

== Natural environment ==
=== Aquatic environment ===
Surveys conducted by the Ministère des Pêches et des Océans du Canada report several species of invertebrates in the waters surrounding the islands. Molluscs noted include the Iceland scallop, Stimpson's surf clam, rock crab and American lobster.

As for fish, the island's waters are frequented by herring, which feed and reproduce close to shore; their eggs serve as food for American plaice. Offshore, minke whales and blue whales probably feed on herring.

=== Terrestrial environment ===
According to an inventory by the Duvetnor company, forest covers 80% of the island's surface and shrubs 10%. The dominant tree is the balsam fir, and there are no rare or endangered plants on the island. The forest is in fairly poor condition due to the colony of Double-crested Cormorants that nest in the trees to the north of the island and dump their droppings there.

As the name implies, Île aux Œufs has long provided the ideal conditions for the establishment of avian colonies. The most abundant bird species is the Common Eider, whose 2,200 pairs make it the fourth largest in the St. Lawrence Estuary. This population is divided into two colonies, the larger of which populates the south of the island. Similarly, Double-crested Cormorants form two colonies, with 385 nests to the north and 250 to the south.

Small colonies of Great Blue Heron and Black-crowned Night-Heron are also found on the island.

Two species of gull – the American herring gull and the Great black-backed gull – nest on the island. The Black Guillemot and Razorbill, a few individuals of which frequent the island's surroundings, may also nest there, although no nests have been discovered.

According to an inventory carried out in 2004 by the Canadian Wildlife Service, Canada goose stop over on Ile aux Œufs. The island is also a feeding ground for Surf Scoter, Black Scoter, Common goldeneye, Common merganser, Red-breasted Merganser and Ring-necked Duck. Species characteristic of the marine and coastal environments of the St. Lawrence, such as the American black duck, Black-crowned night-heron and Common loon, are also found here.

Apart from disturbances caused by humans, the colony population is relatively stable. Although the Red Fox has access to the island in winter, it is too small to maintain a population of Snowshoe Hares sufficient to allow this predator to feed during the summer season and thus threaten the colonies.

== History ==
Before the arrival of European explorers and settlers in the 16th century, Île aux Œufs was an island in the Magtogoek River in the territory of the Innu, an indigenous peoples in Quebec. Probably spotted by French navigators exploring the river, it was first mentioned on a map in 1631. In the early 17th century, the island became part of New France, a colony of the French kingdom in North America. On February 25, 1661, it became part of the Seigneury of Mingan, a colonial concession granted to a merchant (François Bissot) and reserved for hunting and fishing.

In July 1711, Admiral Hovenden Walker led an army of over 12,000 men on nearly 90 ships from Boston Harbor, then a British colony in the Province of Massachusetts Bay. The Walker expedition's mission was to capture Quebec City, capital of the French colony in North America. At the end of August 1711, the British fleet arrived at the mouth of the St. Lawrence River. On the night of August 22 to 23, 1711, under the pressure of a violent storm, part of the British armada crashed into the reefs off Île aux Œufs. The shipwreck claimed 900 lives and put an end to the military expedition.

Damase Potvin wrote on the subject: "The storm had once, in the same area, shattered the pride of another English admiral (in 1690), Sir William Phips, taking from him a thousand men and thirty-eight ships".

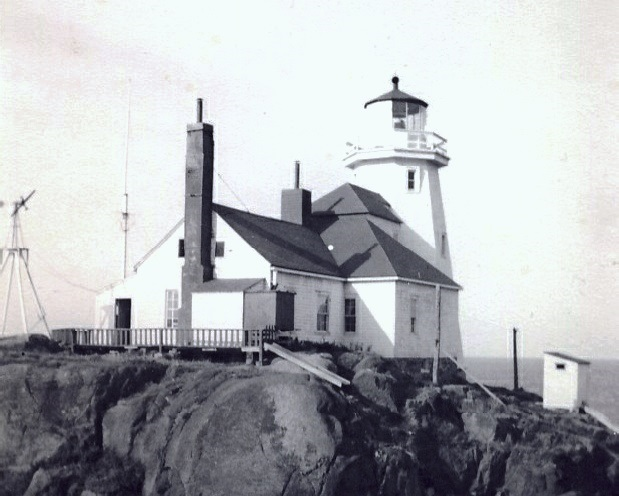
Lighthouse in 1940.

The island has seen several other shipwrecks, including that of the Aquilon in 1880, a schooner belonging to Captain Alexandre Fraser.

The Île aux Œufs lighthouse was built in 1871. This wooden lighthouse house stands 25 m. high. The lighthouse appears to have been an initiative of Maison Trinité de Québec, but the work was completed by the Ministère de la Marine et des Pêcheries. The first keeper was Paul Côté. Starting in 1887, some 15 Acadian families from Anticosti Island settled in Pointe-aux-Anglais, the village near the island, to fish for herring and cod

The lighthouse's wooden tower was replaced by a reinforced concrete octagonal tower in 1955 as part of a program to modernize navigation aids. The new 14 m tower was built to a standardized design requiring minimal maintenance. Until 1969, the lighthouse was successively staffed by six keepers and their families. It seems that they were the first and only inhabitants of the island.

The lighthouse was fully automated in the 1970s and finally closed in 2003.

== Protecting the territory ==
Île aux Œufs comprises four wildlife habitats: the Île aux Œufs heronry (24 ha), the Île aux Œufs waterfowl concentration area (6.3 km^{2}), the Île aux Œufs Nord island or peninsula bird colony (5 ha) and the Île aux Œufs island or peninsula bird colony (14 ha).

On July 5, 1889, the Quebec crown transferred the island, which thus became federal property, to the Department of Marine and Fisheries. The 1996 Bédard Report recommends that the land be returned to its original owner if the Canadian Coast Guard closes the lighthouse. The report also recommended transferring surplus land to the Canadian Wildlife Service, with the aim of transforming the island into a National Wildlife Area.
