= Pentecôte River =

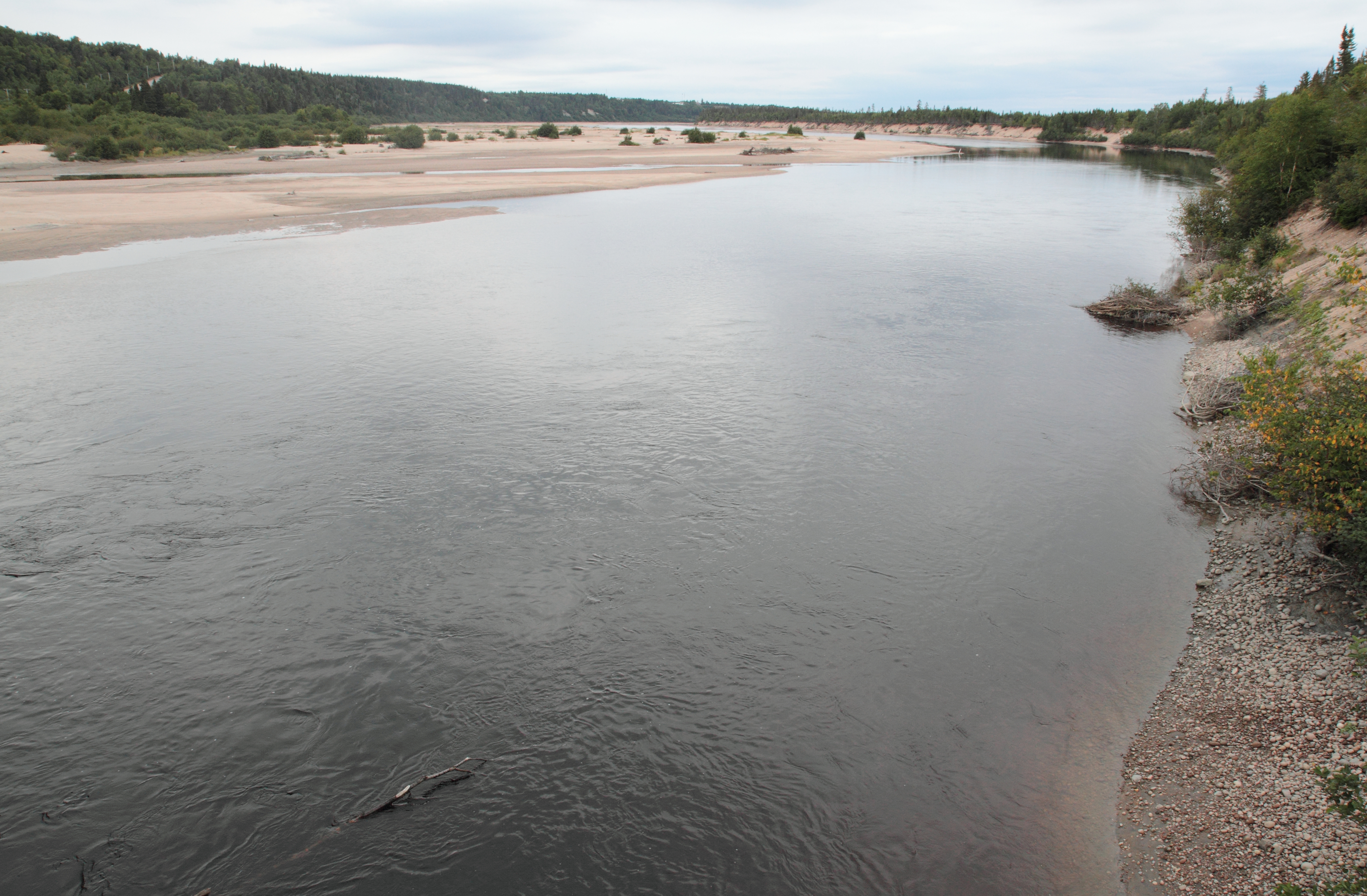
- The river near the point where it joins the Saint Lawrence

- Location within Quebec
- Native name: Rivière Pentecôte (French)

Location
- Country: Canada
- Province: Quebec
- Region: Côte-Nord
- RCM: Sept-Rivières
- Municipality: Port-Cartier

Physical characteristics
- Source
  - location: Lake Bourgeois
  - coordinates: 50.503023°N 67.568373°W
- Mouth
  - location: Gulf of Saint Lawrence
  - coordinates: 49.78°N 67.1644444°W
- Length: 124 kilometres (77 mi)
- Basin size: 1,971 square kilometres (761 sq mi)
- Discharge
  - location: Mouth
  - average: 48 cubic metres per second (1,700 cu ft/s)

Basin features
- NRC id: EHOZH

The Pentecôte River (French: Rivière Pentecôte, pronounced [ʁivjɛʁ pɑ̃tkot]) is a river in the Côte-Nord region or the province of Quebec, Canada. It is a tributary of the Gulf of Saint Lawrence, which it enters beside the community of Rivière-Pentecôte.

== Location and name ==
The Pentecôte River is an important river in the Port-Cartier–Sept-Îles Wildlife Reserve. It is in the municipality of Port-Cartier in the Sept-Rivières Regional County Municipality, Côte-Nord, Quebec.

In the Innu language the river was called Mistecapiu, meaning "Steep Rock". The present name may be attributed to the fact that Jacques Cartier arrived in the area on the Christian holy day of Pentecost (Pentecôte is French for Pentecost). There is a reference to the river in a document by Louis Jolliet from 1685 in which he refers to a river named "Pannecoste". A 1695 map by Deshayes shows the "Rivière de la Pentecoste". In 1744 the cartographer Bellin wrote "R. Michigabiou or R. de la Pentecôte; it is also called R. Sainte Marguerite."

== Environment ==
At the mouth of the Pentecôte River the average annual temperature is 1.9 °C (35.4 °F) and the average annual rainfall is 1,154 millimetres (45.4 in). Climate models indicate that further inland the average annual temperature would be 1 °C (34 °F) and the average annual rainfall would be 1,300 millimetres (51 in).

A map of the Ecological regions of Quebec shows the river rising and flowing south through the eastern spruce/moss domain of the boreal zone. The last section of the river flows through the fir/white birch domain of the boreal zone. Most of the watershed is covered in forest dominated by black spruce (Picea mariana), with balsam fir (Abies balsamea) and to a lesser extent hardwoods such as white birch (Betula papyrifera), trembling aspen (Populus tremuloides) and balsam poplar (Populus balsamifera). On the coastal plain the dominant trees are fir and white spruce (Picea glauca), with white birch and to a lesser extent jack pine (Pinus banksiana), larch (Larix laricina) and trembling aspen.

Fish include Atlantic salmon (Salmo salar) downstream from the Quatorze Arpents Falls. The Atlantic salmon use the river for breeding. The young stay in the river for 2 to 4 years, mostly feeding on insect larvae, then run down to the estuary and migrate towards Greenland. Salmon fishing is allowed, subject to regulations. An average of 40 catches are reported annually, although the true figure would be higher.

Anadromous brook trout, also known as sea trout, also uses the mouth of the river to feed and sometimes migrates several kilometers from the river mouth to spawn in shallow water. Other types of fish include rainbow smelt (Osmerus mordax), American eel (Anguilla rostrata), brook trout (Salvelinus fontinalis) and sucker (Catostomidae species). Rainbow trout (Oncorhynchus mykiss) is rare but has been reported.

== Course ==
The Pentecôte River is 124 kilometres (77 mi) long. It originates in Lake Bourgeois, one of the lakes along the route of the Cartier Railway, and flows southeast to enter the Gulf of Saint Lawrence beside the community of Rivière-Pentecôte. In the locality named "La Porte-de-Caotibi" the Pentecôte River runs for over 25 kilometres (16 mi) through a V-shaped valley with very steep slopes more than 400 metres (1,300 ft) high in places. It bypasses Mont J'Y-Vois-le-Nord, then continues south through the 17 kilometres (11 mi) Lake Pentecôte to the Saint-Laurent. It is navigable by small boats for 4 kilometres (2.5 mi) from its mouth, where it flows between steep banks of sand and clay. It can be navigated by canoe for 13 kilometres (8.1 mi) up to the Quatorze Arpents Fall.

The river descends by 701 metres (2,300 ft) from its source to its mouth. The estimated annual flow at its mouth is 57.3 cubic metres per second (2,020 cu ft/s). (Note: Another source gives an average flow at its mouth of 48 cubic metres per second (1,700 cu ft/s).) It peaks at an average flow of 130 cubic metres per second (4,600 cu ft/s), and its lowest flow averages 13.6 cubic metres per second (480 cu ft/s). Tributaries, from upstream to downstream are Coude, Caotibi, De l’Est, Aux Couleuvres, Profonde, Aux Crapauds, Dubé and Du Pont rivers. The Quatorze Arpents Fall is 14 kilometres (8.7 mi) from the mouth of the Pentecôte River. At the end of its course the river makes two wide meanders before entering the Gulf of Saint Lawrence through a mouth that is just 75 metres (246 ft) wide.

A 2019 report by Radio Canada noted that there was a risk that the river would soon break through the spit separating the last reach from the sea, causing the mouth of the river to move south by more than 2 kilometres (1.2 mi), as had happened at Portneuf-sur-Mer in 1930. The sand spit was being eroded both by the river and by waves from the Gulf, and in one place was no more than 12 metres (39 ft) wide. A large storm, or the next spring flood, could cause the river to break through. The remainder of the reach could then turn into a salt marsh.

== Basin ==
The Pentecôte watershed covers an area of 1,980 square kilometres (760 sq mi). It is in the west of Sept-Rivières. To the east it is bordered by the watersheds of the Aux Rochers and Riverin rivers, and to the south by the Calumet zone of coastal streams. To the west it is bordered by the Manicouagan water management zone. The watershed is elongated, about 100 kilometres (62 mi) from north to south and 20 kilometres (12 mi) wide.

The coastal plain along the Gulf of Saint Lawrence is up to 9 kilometres (5.6 mi) wide. It has a few escarpments by the coast and then a fairly flat plateau with an elevation of about 100 metres (330 ft) above sea level. Inland from the plain a zone of rounded rocky hills up to 500 metres (1,600 ft) high extends north for 12–20 kilometres (7.5–12.4 mi). Further inland again, the remainder of the watershed is a highly dissected rocky plateau with steep slopes, whose highest point is in the northwest at 792 metres (2,598 ft). The stream courses are angular, following fractures in the bedrock. Higher up the streams tend to follow straight courses along narrow valleys, while lower down they meander in the deposits of the coastal plain.

The watershed lies in a region of more or less deformed magmatic rocks, including migmatite, anorthosite, granite, syenite and gneiss complexes. The higher areas generally have thin soil with many large areas of rocky outcrops. Several of the valleys hold extensive fluvioglacial sediments. The coastal plain has large amounts of clay and silt sediments deposited by the Goldthwait Sea after the glaciers withdrew, which were then covered by coarser sandy estuarine and deltaic sediments.

== Lakes ==
Waterbodies including streams and lakes cover 7% of the watershed, while wetlands cover 0.95%, and are mostly found on the coastal plain in flat areas with fine sediments. The main lakes all have elongated shapes along a north south axis. They are, from north to south:

Lake	Area	Coordinates	Ref.	Map
Lac Bourgeois	11.3 square kilometres (4.4 sq mi)	50.5925°N 67.5300°W		EFQBT
Lac Simard / Petit lac Simard	5.65 square kilometres (2.18 sq mi)	50.3047°N 67.4647°W		EIDOY
Lac Paul-Côté	4.82 square kilometres (1.86 sq mi)	49.9105°N 67.4611°W		EHOKF
Lac Pentecôte	21.2 square kilometres (8.2 sq mi)	49.8719°N 67.3355°W		EHOZG

=== Lake Pentecôte ===
Lake Pentecôte, on the River Pentecôte, is the largest lake, with an area of 21.2 square kilometres (8.2 sq mi). It is very elongated, stretching almost 16 kilometres (9.9 mi) from north to south, with a width of less than 2 kilometres (1.2 mi). It was formed by the flooding of a glacial valley and is in a trough with steeps sides that in some places rise almost 300 metres (980 ft). The lake's outlet is 17 kilometres (11 mi) from the mouth of the river. Lake Pentecôte is a prime fishing location, but a boat is needed.

=== Lake Bourgeois ===
The origin of the name of Lac Bourgeois is not known. It is just south of the Grand lac Caotibi, to which it is almost connected by a channel. The south end of Grand lac Caotibi lies along the same line with the north end of Lac Bourgeois, and the Pentecôte River continues south along the same line. The Cartier Railway, which runs along the MacDonald River valley from the southeast, crosses to Lac Bourgeois and runs along its northeast shore and then along the east shore of the Grand lac Caotibi as it continues north towards Mont Wright.

Lac Bourgeois is on the eastern margin of Sector 17B of the Port-Cartier–Sept-Îles Wildlife Reserve. The land around the north end of the lake and to the east of the lake is mostly forested with timber over 30 years old, although there are small patches of forest 10-30-year-old trees. The forest east of the south part of the lake is fully protected.

== Sources ==
- Bordeleau, Jean-Louis (15 June 2019), La rivière Pentecôte menace de changer de trajectoire (in French), Radio Canada
- Fleury, Éric (2013), Plan d'aménagement forestier intégré opérationnel 2014-2017 Unité d'aménagement 094-51 (PDF) (Map: see NW corner), Ministère des Ressources naturelles, Gouvernement du Québec
- Lac Bourgeois, Commission de toponymie du Québec
- Lac Bourgeois, Natural Resources Canada
- Lac Paul-Côté, Commission de toponymie du Québec
- Lac Pentecôte, Commission de toponymie du Québec
- Lac Simard, Commission de toponymie du Québec
- "Portrait du bassin versant Pentecôte", Secteur d'étude Sept-Rivières (PDF), OBV Duplessis
- Réserve faunique de Port-Cartier–Sept-Îles Secteur de chasse no. 17B (PDF) (in French), Sépac
- Rivière Pentecôte, Commission de toponymie du Québec
- "Rivière Pentecôte", GrandQuebec
- "Rivière-Pentecôte", GrandQuebec (in French)
- Rivière-Pentecôte (municipalité) (in French), Commission de toponymie du Québec
- Rivière Pentecôte, Natural Resources Canada
- Saucier, J.-P.; Robitaille, A.; Grondin, P.; Bergeron, J.-F.; Gosselin, J. (2011), Les régions écologiques du Québec méridional (PDF) (map), 4 (in French), Ministère des Ressources naturelles et de la Faune, archived from the original (PDF) on 2020-06-19
