= Riverin River =

- Location within Quebec
- Native name: Rivière Riverin (French)

Location
- Country: Canada
- Province: Quebec
- Region: Côte-Nord
- RCM: Sept-Rivières
- Municipality: Port-Cartier

Physical characteristics
- Mouth
  - location: Gulf of Saint Lawrence
  - coordinates: 49.7855556°N 67.1563889°W
- Length: 34 kilometres (21 mi)
- Basin size: 218 square kilometres (84 sq mi)
- Discharge
  - location: Mouth

Basin features
- Tributaries
  - left: Crique Paul EJMLE
- NRC id: EHWEN

The Riverin River (French: Rivière Riverin) is a river in the Côte-Nord region of the province of Quebec, Canada. It is a tributary of the Gulf of Saint Lawrence. There is a small hydroelectric power plant near the mouth of the river.

== Location ==
The Riverin River is in Port-Cartier, Sept-Rivières, Quebec. The river is fed by a few relatively small lakes, including Lac Riverin in the canton of Grenier. It flows southward, with many rapids. At its mouth, it flows under Quebec Route 138 and into the Saint Lawrence just north of the community of Rivière-Pentecôte. 57.8 square kilometres (22.3 sq mi) of the river basin, or 26.5%, is in the Port-Cartier–Sept-Îles Wildlife Reserve.

At the mouth of the river the average annual temperature is 1.9 °C (35.4 °F) and the average annual rainfall is 1,154 millimetres (45.4 in). Climate models indicate that further inland the average annual temperature would be 1 °C (34 °F) and the average annual rainfall would be 1,300 millimetres (51 in).

== Name ==
The Pessamit Innu, called Riverin by the Europeans, hunted and fished by the river until around 1900. The name of the river, which dates back to at least 1913, reflects the presence of these people in the area.

== River ==
The Riverin River has a length of 34 kilometres (21 mi) and a vertical drop of 366 metres (1,201 ft). The mean flow varies from 1.69 to 19.2 cubic metres per second (60 to 678 cu ft/s), with an annual average of 8.07 cubic metres per second (285 cu ft/s). The Simard Fall is 9 kilometres (5.6 mi) from the river mouth and the Fred Fall is 5.5 kilometres (3.4 mi) from the mouth. There is a dam at a distance of 1 kilometre (0.62 mi) from the mouth. Below the dam there is a 9 metres (30 ft) high cascade. An unnamed fall 300 metres (980 ft) from the mouth prevents saltwater tides from flowing further upstream.

The Riverin River is not recognized as a salmon river. There are rainbow smelt (Osmerus mordax) at the mouth of the river, and other fish include American eel (Anguilla rostrata), brook trout (Salvelinus fontinalis) and three-spined stickleback (Gasterosteus aculeatus).

== Dam ==
The 6 metres (20 ft) high Barrage de la Rivière-Riverin retains a head of 3.4 metres (11 ft) and holds 180,999 cubic metres (6,391,900 cu ft) in a 10.6 hectares (26 acres) reservoir. The dam was built in 1946. It is a concrete structure 90.5 metres (297 ft) long on a rock foundation. The present 2.01 MW power plant is owned by Pouvoir Riverin and Algonquin Power Fund (Canada) and came into operation in 1999.

== Watershed ==
The Riverin watershed covers 218 square kilometres (84 sq mi), equally divided between the unorganized territory of Lac-Walker (50.2%) and the town of Port-Cartier (49.8%). To the east the watershed is bordered by the watershed of the Pentecôte River, and to the north and west by the watershed of the Aux Rochers. The watershed is about 35 kilometres (22 mi) long from north to south, and about 10 kilometres (6.2 mi) wide inland, shrinking to less than 1 kilometre (0.62 mi) wide in the coastal plain. The coastal plain extends inland for about 10 kilometres (6.2 mi), gradually rising to an elevation of 100 metres (330 ft). Beyond this the river basin is in a rocky plateau with rounded hills, sometimes with steep slopes. The highest point is 437 metres (1,434 ft) in the northeast of the watershed.

The land is based on magmatic rocks, including assemblages of anorthosite and gabbro-norite, syenite, monzonite, granodiorite and diorite, migmatite, granite and pegmatite. In the plateau the bedrock is often exposed in outcroppings, or is covered with a thin layer of soil. The coastal plain has large amounts of clay and silt sediments deposited by the Goldthwait Sea after the glaciers withdrew, which were then covered by coarser sandy estuarine and deltaic sediments. Wetlands account for 5.63% of the basin, and are found on the coastal plain in flat areas with fine sediments. Upstream, the rivers follow angular courses dictated by fractures in the bedrock. In the coastal plain the rivers develop meanders in the loose sediments.

== Lakes ==
Lakes in the watershed include:

Lake	Area	Coordinates	Map
Lac du Canot	78.8 hectares (195 acres)	49.9916°N 67.2675°W	EFTGG
Lac Lapointe	33.2 hectares (82 acres)	50.0013°N 67.2647°W	EGXQY
Lac Riverin	163 hectares (400 acres)	50.0055°N 67.2886°W	EHWEI

== Sources ==
- Aménagements hydroélectriques selon les régions administratives et les bassins versants (in French), Énergie et des Ressources naturelles Québec, archived from the original on 2019-08-23
- "Portrait du bassin versant Pentecôte", Secteur d’étude Sept-Rivières (PDF), OBV Duplessis
- Portrait du bassin versant Riverin (PDF) (in French), OBV Duplessis
- Rivière-Riverin, Barrage de la, Ministère de l'Environnement et de la Lutte contre les changements climatiques
- Rivière Riverin (in French), Commission de toponymie du Québec
- Rivière Riverin, Natural Resources Canada
