= John Hill (British Army officer, died 1735) =

17/18th-century British army officer

Major-General John Hill
- Died: 19/22 June 1735; Jermyn Street, London
- Alma mater: St Albans School, Hertfordshire
- Relatives: Abigail Masham, Baroness Masham (sister); Sarah Churchill, Duchess of Marlborough (cousin)
- Military career
- Allegiance: Great Britain
- Branch: British Army
- Service years: 1702–1715
- Rank: Major-General
- Nickname: Jack
- Commands: Hill's Regiment of Foot
- Conflicts: War of the Spanish Succession; Battle of Almansa (POW); Siege of Mons (WIA); Quebec expedition

Member of Parliament for Lostwithiel
- In office 1710–1713 Serving with Hugh Fortescue

Personal details
- Party: Tory

Major-General John Hill (died 19/22 June 1735) was a British Army officer and courtier during the reign of Queen Anne. While of no particular military ability, his family connections brought him promotion and office until the end of Anne's reign.

== Early life ==
Jack, as he was known, was the youngest son of the merchant Francis Hill and his wife Elizabeth Jenyns, and hence the brother of Abigail Hill, later Baroness Masham. The failure of his father's business left the family dependent upon the largesse of their cousin Sarah Churchill, later Duchess of Marlborough. Sarah paid for Hill's education at the St Albans Grammar School from 1690 to 1691, and obtained for him an appointment as a page to Prince George of Denmark in 1692 and then in 1698 as a Groom of the Bedchamber to the Duke of Gloucester. After Gloucester's death, he briefly returned to Prince George's household in 1700.

== Military career ==
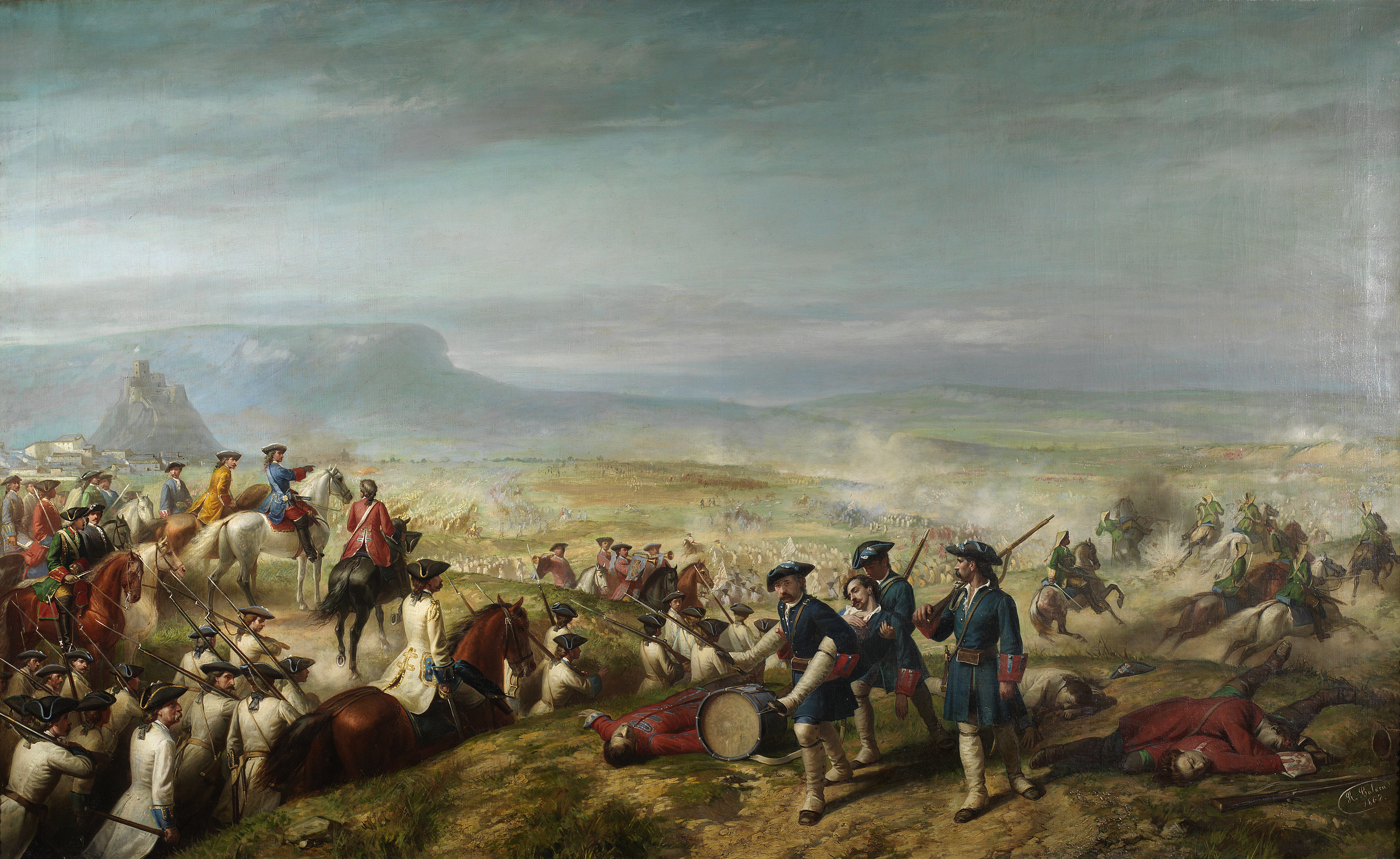
The Battle of Almansa in 1707. Hill commanded a regiment in the Allied Army. After heavy fighting he was taken prisoner.

The Duke of Marlborough obtained for Hill a captaincy in the Grenadier Guards in November 1702, and he was made adjutant general to the forces sent into Portugal in 1703. In May 1705, he was made colonel of the former Lord Stanhope's Regiment of Foot. This rapid rise owed little to military talent; while partly brought about through the patronage of Marlborough, it was increasingly due to the ascent of his sister Abigail, who was now displacing her cousin the Duchess in Anne's favour. However, according to the duchess, Marlborough "always said that jack Hill was good for nothing," She then confessed "yet to oblige me he made him his aide-de-camp and afterwards gave him a regiment." She goes on to confirm that Abigail was behind his promotion to general.

In 1706, he and his regiment took part in the expedition under Earl Rivers, originally directed against the coast of France but subsequently diverted to Lisbon. In 1707, Hill and the regiment were shipped to Valencia, to take part in the campaign which ended with the Battle of Almansa. Hill commanded a brigade during the battle, comprising his own regiment with William Steuart's and Thomas Alnutt's regiments. Hill's brigade attacked the French during the latter stages of the battle and allowed the remaining British forces to retreat in good order, but he and his regiment were captured by the French.

Hill was paroled and returned to England to reform his regiment, which was sent to the Netherlands in summer 1708 and took part in the siege of Mons in 1709. On 26 September 1709, Hill's regiment was sent to advance the siege lines against the town and had to fight off a sally in which it suffered 150 casualties, including Hill, who was wounded.

== Rise under the Tories ==
By 1710, Hill's sister, Lady Masham, had supplanted her cousin in the Queen's affections and now joined Robert Harley to weaken Marlborough and advance her brother. The Queen, prompted by Harley, solicited for Hill the colonelcy of the late Earl of Essex's Regiment of Dragoons. Marlborough refused to promote Hill over officers more experienced and deserving, placing additional strain on his relationship with the Queen. In April, he was forced to accede to the Queen's demand that Hill be promoted brigadier general. In May, Hill also received a pension of £1000 p.a. during the lifetime of the Queen. Marlborough and the Whigs in Parliament attempted to have Lady Masham removed from Court, an unsuccessful move which ultimately precipitated Marlborough's own political demise.

Hill, in the meantime, was returned as a Member of Parliament for Lostwithiel in 1710. He showed little activity in the House of Commons, although, as his one-time patroness, the Duchess of Marlborough sourly noted, he did trouble himself to vote once, when ill, to support Harley's attacks on Marlborough.She bitterly continued " this once ragged boy whom I clothed, happening to be sick in bed, was nevertheless persuaded by his sister to get up,wrap himself in warmer clothes than those I had given him, and go to the House to vote against the Duke.

According to Sarah's descendant Winston Churchill, The Duchess was annoyed that her generosity had prepared her own undoing and her husband's fall at the moment when the consummation of all his victories and toils seemed so near. "'One of the traceble causes of her catastrophe."

Moreover, this author, who understood the nature of armies and politics, considered that the promotion of Hill was an insult "of the most carefully studied character" which effectively undermined Marlborough's authority over the British forces. He quotes Sarah again; "The dispute was not between the queen and my lord Duke, as some will have it, but whether Mrs Masham and her party should have a disposal of all the vacancies in the army, and by degrees, of everything else." Thus the tories obtained, through the demise of Marlborough, a fatal blow to the integrity and potency of the alliance against Louis XIV.

== Expedition against Quebec ==
Well-connected with the Harley Ministry, Hill's star continued to rise. When Henry St John in 1711 revived a plan for the capture of Quebec, Hill was proposed as commander-in-chief to gain the Queen's favor. 5 000 troops under Hill's command, in thirty transports escorted by ten ships of the line under Sir Hovenden Walker, embarked for Quebec, but eight transports with 800 men were wrecked in the Saint Lawrence River on 11 August 1711 owing to fogs and gales. Hill and Walker, after a Council of War, abandoned the enterprise without firing a shot and returned to England. Jonathan Swift, a confidant of Hill, noted that Hill's friends privately blamed him for his irresolution and lack of leadership. Hill's Tory connections, however, allowed him to escape any check in his career arising from this disaster.

== Further promotion ==
In June 1712, Hill became Lieutenant-General of the Ordnance, the Whig Thomas Erle having been turned out, and received the office of Governor of Dunkirk after the signing of the Treaty of Utrecht. In July he was promoted major general, and sworn of the Privy Council in November. Perhaps impelled by hopes of a never-offered peerage, he did not stand for election in 1713. In London, Hill was elected to the society of wits headed by Swift and St John, and was known for his great conviviality. He returned to Dunkirk in February 1714 as a commissioner to inspect the fortifications, but came back to England in August for the accession of George I.

== Later life ==
With the death of Anne and the accession of George I, Hill lost his offices, but retained his commission as major-general. He sold his colonelcy to Edward Montagu in July 1715 and retired. Both he and Lady Masham retained Tory sympathies in their later years, which Hill spent at his seat in Egham and his London house in Jermyn Street, where he died. He left his estate to his nephew Samuel Masham, 2nd Baron Masham.

Parliament of Great Britain
Preceded by Francis Robartes; Horatio Walpole	Member of Parliament for Lostwithiel; 1710–1713; With: Hugh Fortescue	Succeeded by Sir Thomas Clarges; Erasmus Lewis
Military offices
Preceded by James Stanhope	Colonel of John Hill's Regiment of Foot; 1705–1715	Succeeded by Edward Montagu
Preceded by Thomas Erle	Lieutenant-General of the Ordnance; 1712–1714	Succeeded by Thomas Erle
