= Quebec expedition (1711) =

1711 failed British attempt to attack Quebec during Queen Anne's War

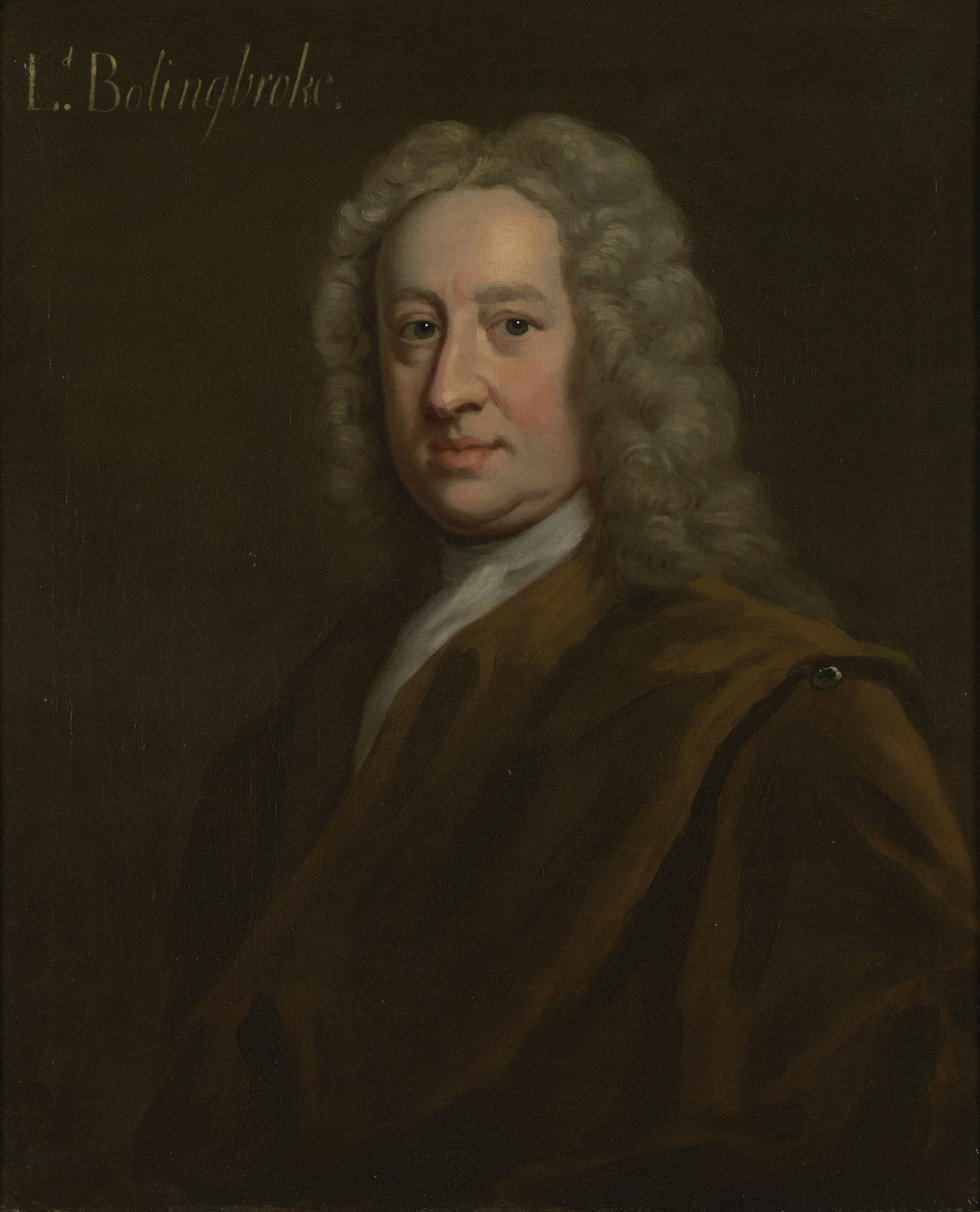
- Henry St. John (later Lord Bolingbroke) organised the expedition portrait by Charles Jervas

Shipwreck
- Date: 22 August 1711
- Summary: navigation accident
- Site: St. Lawrence River; 49°38′15″N 67°10′30″W
- Operator: Royal Navy
- Destination: Quebec, New France
- Fatalities: about 890 (705 soldiers, 150 sailors, 35 women)

The Quebec expedition (also known as the Walker expedition to Quebec) was a British attempt to attack French-held Quebec City in mid-1711 during Queen Anne's War, the North American theatre of the War of the Spanish Succession. It failed when seven troopships and one storeship were wrecked and 890 soldiers, sailors and women drowned in one of the worst naval disasters in British history.

Planned by the Harley ministry, the expedition was based on plans originally proposed in 1708. Lord Harley decided to mount the expedition as part of a major shift in British military policy, emphasizing strength at sea. The expedition's leaders, Rear-Admiral of the White Sir Hovenden Walker and Brigadier-general John Hill, were chosen for their politics and connections to the Crown, and its plans were kept secret even from the British Admiralty. French agents were able to discover British intentions and warn authorities in Quebec.

The expedition expected to be fully provisioned in Boston, the capital of the British Province of Massachusetts Bay, but the city was unprepared when it arrived, and Massachusetts authorities had to scramble to provide even three months' supplies. Walker also had difficulty acquiring experienced maritime pilots and accurate nautical charts for navigating the waters of the lower Saint Lawrence River. Departing on 30 July, the expedition reached the Gulf of Saint Lawrence without incident, but foggy conditions, tricky currents, and strong winds combined to drive the fleet towards the north shore of the river near a place now called Pointe-aux-Anglais, where eight ships were wrecked on 22 August. Following the disaster, Walker abandoned the expedition's objectives and returned to England. Although the expedition was a failure, Harley continued to implement his "blue water" policy.

== Background ==
In 1710, late in the War of the Spanish Succession, a mixed force of British regulars and American colonists captured the French fort at Port Royal on the northwestern coast of Acadia (present-day Annapolis Royal, Nova Scotia). Francis Nicholson, the leader of the expedition, brought news of the victory to London, where he and Jeremiah Dummer, who represented the Province of Massachusetts Bay in London, lobbied for an expedition against Quebec, the capital of New France.

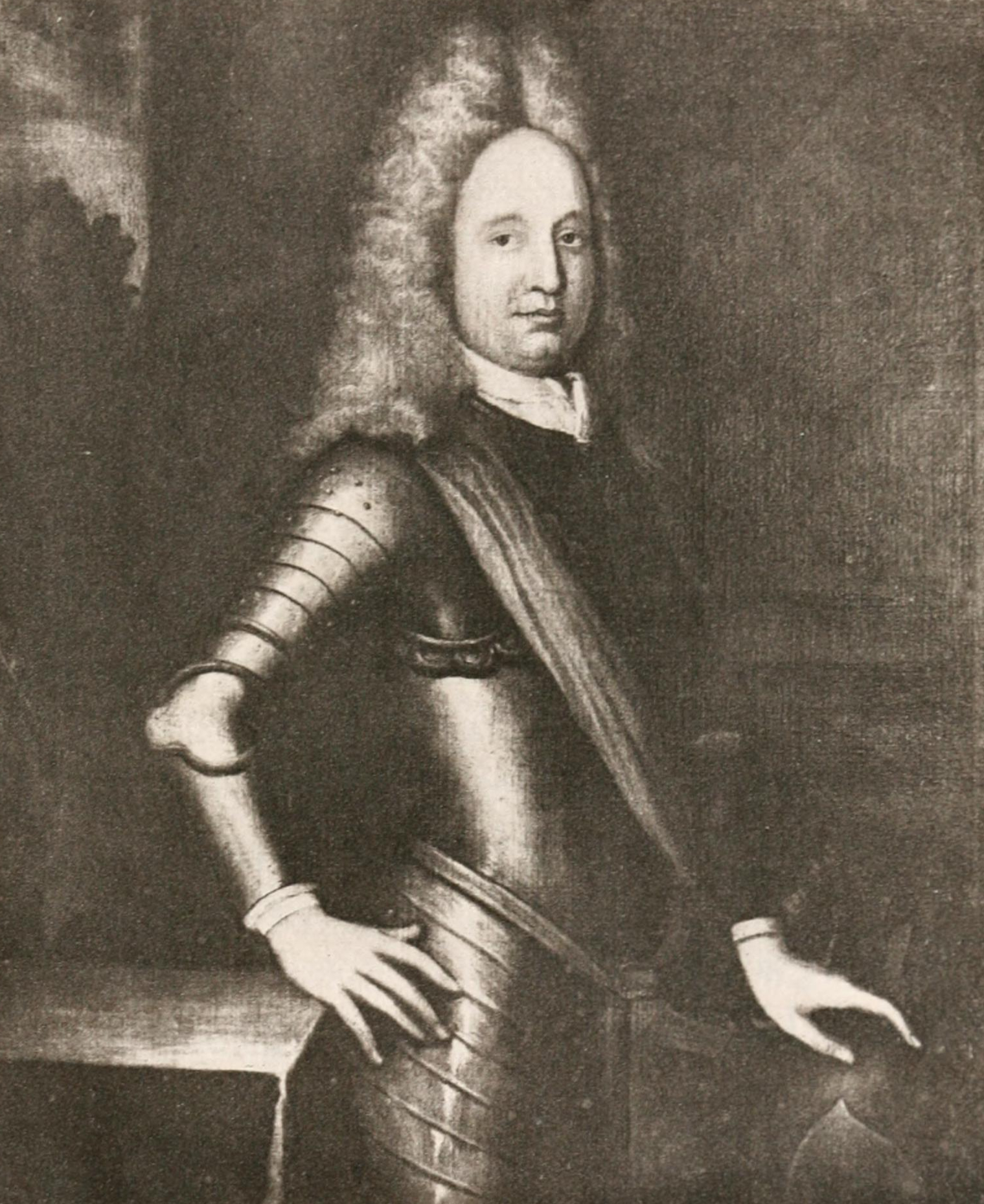
Samuel Vetch, who first proposed a similar expedition in 1708

The British government was in some turmoil, and in August 1710, the ministry of Lord Godolphin fell. Queen Anne replaced him with Robert Harley, a political opponent of the Duke of Marlborough, who had also fallen out of favour. Harley wanted to change Britain's military strategy, implementing a "blue water" policy that emphasized strength at sea, at the cost of a reduced army. He also sought to blunt Marlborough's continuing influence with a victory of his own devising. Harley therefore authorised expeditions by land and sea to capture Quebec, but fell ill, so most of the work of organisation was done by his Secretary of State, Henry St. John (the future Lord Bolingbroke).

The basic plan followed one first proposed by Samuel Vetch in 1708 for the 1709 campaign season, with the main thrust to be a naval expedition carrying a combined force of regular army forces and provincial troops. Rear-Admiral of the White Sir Hovenden Walker was given overall command of the expedition, with Brigadier-general John Hill in command of the expedition's army contigent. Walker, who was promoted to admiral in March, had led a squadron on an expedition to the West Indies earlier in the war that had failed to produce significant results, and may have been chosen due to his friendship with St. John and his Tory sympathies. St. John probably chose Hill to curry favour at court: he was the brother of Queen Anne's confidante Abigail Masham. The duchess of Marlborough, presumably echoing the opinions of her husband, wrote of Hill that "he was no good as a soldier". Five regiments from Marlborough's force in Flanders were added to two from Britain to build a force of some 5,000 land troops. This force sailed from ports in southern England in April and May 1711. Its destination was a tightly guarded secret: Walker was not immediately informed of its destination, nor were the Lords of the Admiralty informed, and it was provisioned only with sufficient supplies for a typical voyage in European waters in an attempt to mislead spies.

== Boston ==
Francis Nicholson arrived in Boston in early June 1711 with news and details of the expedition plans, and a meeting of provincial governors was quickly arranged in New London, Connecticut. The naval expedition was to include provincial militia raised in the New England colonies, while Nicholson led a provincial force raised in provinces from Connecticut to Pennsylvania up the Hudson River and down Lake Champlain to Montreal. The provincial forces that were to go with Walker's expedition were led by Samuel Vetch, who became the governor of Nova Scotia in 1710. They consisted of 1,500 men, most from Massachusetts, with smaller contingents from New Hampshire and Rhode Island.

The fleet arrived in Boston on 24 June, and the troops were disembarked onto Noddle's Island (the present-day location of Logan International Airport). The size of the force was, according to historian Samuel Adams Drake, "the most formidable that had ever crossed the Atlantic under the English flag." Since the fleet had left with insufficient supplies, its organizers expected it to be fully provisioned in Boston. But as the number of soldiers and sailors outnumbered the population of Boston, this proved a daunting task. Laws were passed to prevent merchants from price-gouging, and sufficient provisions were eventually acquired. Additional laws were passed penalising residents found harbouring deserters from the fleet; apparently the attraction of colonial life was sufficient that this was a significant problem during the five weeks the expedition was in Boston.

During the expedition's sojourn in Boston, Walker attempted to enlist pilots experienced in navigating the Saint Lawrence River. To his dismay, none were forthcoming; even Captain Cyprian Southack, reputed to be one of the colony's best navigators, stated he had never been beyond the river's mouth. Walker intended to rely principally on a Frenchman he had picked up in Plymouth prior to the fleet's departure. Samuel Vetch, however, deeply distrusted the Frenchman, writing that he was "not only an ignorant, pretending, idle, drunken Fellow", but that he "is come upon no good Design". Following this report, Walker also forced a Captain Jean Paradis, the captain of a captured French sloop, to serve as navigator. The charts Walker accumulated were notably short in details on the area around the mouth of the Saint Lawrence, as was the journal Sir William Phips kept of his 1690 expedition to Quebec, which Walker also acquired. Walker interviewed some participants in the Phips expedition, whose vague tales did nothing to relieve his concerns about what he could expect on the river. These concerns prompted him to detach his largest and heaviest ships for cruising duty, and he transferred his flag to the 70-gun Edgar.

== Disaster ==
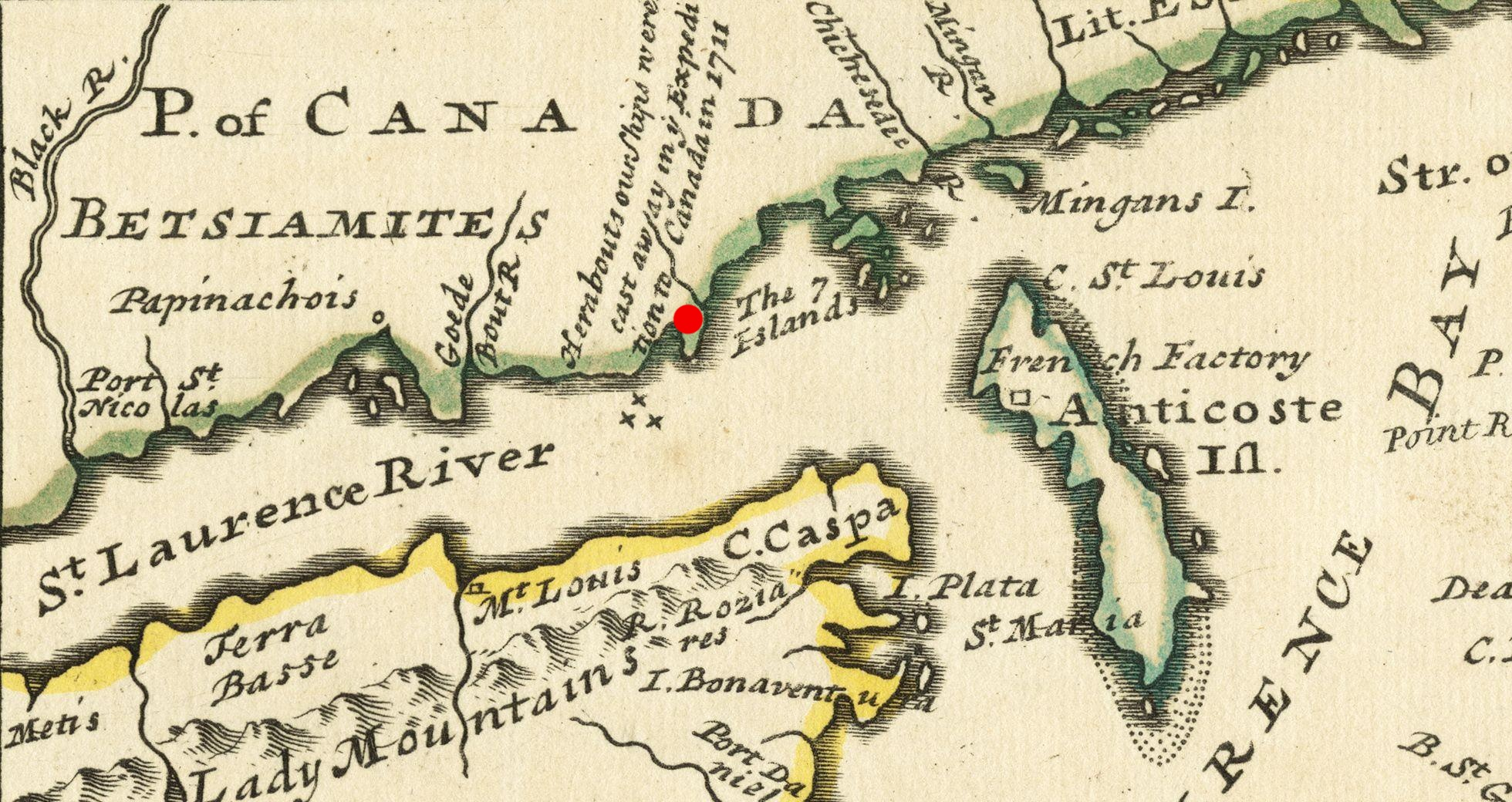
The approximate site of the disaster is marked in red on this 1733 map detail.

On 30 July, the fleet set sail from Boston. It consisted of a number of British and colonial ships, including nine ships of war, two bomb vessels, and 60 transports and tenders. It carried 7,500 troops and about 6,000 sailors. By 3 August the fleet reached the coast of Nova Scotia, and Samuel Vetch piloted the fleet around Cape Breton and Cape North on Cape Breton Island, and into the Gulf of Saint Lawrence.

On the morning of 18 August, just as the expedition was about to enter the Saint Lawrence River, the wind began to blow hard from the northwest, and Walker was forced to seek shelter in Gaspé Bay. On the morning of the 20th, the wind veered to the southeast, and he was able to advance slowly past the western extremity of Anticosti Island before it died down and thick fog blanketed both shore and fleet. By the 22nd, the wind had freshened from the southeast, and there were intermittent breaks in the fog, but not sufficient to give sight of land. At this point the fleet was west of Anticosti at a point where the Saint Lawrence was about 70 miles (110 km) wide, but it narrowed noticeably at a point where the river's North Shore made a sharp turn, running nearly north–south. This area, near what is now called Pointe-aux-Anglais, includes a number of small islands, including Île-aux-Oeufs (Egg Island), and numerous rocky shallows. After consulting his pilots, Walker gave the signal to steer the fleet roughly southwest at about 8:00 pm.

Walker had thought he was in mid-stream when he issued the order. In fact, he was about seven leagues (about 20 miles (32 km)) north of his proper course, and in the grasp of strong currents which steered his ships towards the northwest. Propelled by an easterly wind, the fleet was gradually closing on the north–south shore near Île-aux-Oeufs. When Captain Paddon reported to Walker that land had been sighted around 10:30 pm, presumably dead ahead, Walker assumed that the fleet was approaching the south shore, and ordered the fleet to wear, and bring-to on the other tack, before he went to bed. This manoeuvre put the fleet onto a more northerly heading. Some minutes later, an army captain named Goddard roused Walker, claiming to see breakers ahead. Walker dismissed the advice and the man, but Goddard returned, insisting that the admiral "come upon deck myself, or we should certainly be lost".

Walker came on deck in his dressing gown, and saw that the ship was being driven toward the western lee shore by the east wind. When the French navigator came on deck, he explained to Walker where he was; Walker immediately ordered the anchor cables cut, and beat against the wind to escape the danger. Two of the warships, Montague and Windsor, had more difficulty, and ended up anchored for the night in a precarious situation, surrounded by breakers. Throughout the night, Walker heard sounds of distress, and at times when the fog lifted, ships could be seen in the distance being ground against the rocks. One New Englander wrote that he could "hear the shrieks of the sinking, drowning, departing souls." Around 2:00 am the wind subsided, and then shifted to the northwest, and most of the fleet managed to stand away from the shore.

It took three days to discover the full extent of the disaster, during which the fleet searched for survivors. Seven transports and one supply ship were lost. Walker's initial report was that 884 soldiers perished; later reports revised this number down to 740, including women attached to some of the units. Historian Gerald Graham estimates that about 150 sailors also perished in the disaster. After rescuing all he could, Walker and Hill held a war council on 25 August. After interviewing a number of the pilots, including Samuel Vetch, the council decided "that by reason of the Ignorance of the Pilots abord the Men of War", the expedition should be aborted. Vetch openly blamed Walker for the disaster: "The late disaster cannot, in my humble opinion, be anyways imputed to the difficulty of navigation, but to the wrong course we steered, which most unavoidably carried us upon the north shore."

The fleet sailed down the Gulf of Saint Lawrence and came to anchor at Spanish River (now the harbour of Sydney, Nova Scotia) on 4 September, where a council was held to discuss whether or not to attack the French at Plaisance. Given the lateness of the season, insufficient supplies to overwinter in the area, and rumours of strong defences at Plaisance, the council decided against making the attack, and sailed for Britain.

== Return ==
Nicholson's land expedition learnt of the naval disaster when it was encamped near Lake George; Nicholson aborted the expedition. He was reported to be so angry that he tore off his wig and threw it to the ground. The expedition's fortunes did not improve on the return voyage. Walker had written to New York requesting HMS Feversham and any available supply ships to join him; unbeknownst to him, the Feversham and three transports (Joseph, Mary, and Neptune) were wrecked on the coast of Cape Breton on 7 October with more than 100 men lost. The fleet returned to Portsmouth on 10 October; Walker's flagship, the Edgar, blew up several days later, possibly due to improper handling of gunpowder. Walker lost a number of papers as a result, and claimed that the journal of William Phips was lost in the blast.

Despite the magnitude of the expedition's failure, the political consequences were relatively mild. The failure was an early setback in Robert Harley's "blue water" policy, which called for the aggressive use of the navy to keep Britain's enemies at bay. Harley nevertheless continued to implement the policy, withdrawing further resources from European military campaigns. Since the project had been organised by the current government, it was also not interested in delving deeply into the reasons for its failure. Walker was sympathetically received by the queen, and both he and Hill were given new commands. Walker eventually wrote a detailed and frank account of the expedition, based on his memory as well as surviving journals and papers; it is reprinted in Graham. Walker was stripped of his rank in 1715 (amid a larger change of power including the accession of King George I), and died in 1728.

Popular sentiment in Britain tended to fault the colonies for failing to properly support the expedition, citing their supposed parsimony and stubbornness. These arguments were rejected in the colonies, where Nicholson and Dudley instead blamed Walker. The relations between military officials and colonists was not always cordial during the army's stay outside Boston, and foreshadowed difficult relations between American colonists and the British military which ultimately came to a head in the American Revolutionary War. One of Hill's officers wrote that the "ill Nature and Sowerness of these People, whose Government, Doctrine, and Manners, whose Hypocracy and canting, are unsupportable" and further commented that unless they were brought under firmer control, the colonists would "grow more stiff and disobedient every Day." Colonists noted with some disgust the fact that both Walker and Hill escaped censure for the expedition's failure.

== French actions ==
Authorities in France were alerted as early as March 1711 that Nicholson was organising an expedition against Quebec. They also knew the composition of Hill's force, but were apparently unaware of his destination until July. The Governor-general of New France, the marquis de Vaudreuil, sent Louis Denys de La Ronde to Boston ostensibly to oversee a prisoner exchange in early June. La Ronde also had secret instructions that he was to try to convince the colonial authorities to withhold support from expeditions sent from Great Britain. La Ronde, who coincidentally arrived in Boston on 8 June, the same day as Nicholson, was apparently unsuccessful in his attempts to influence colonial opinion. Nicholson became suspicious of his behaviour and eventually had him arrested. When copies of his secret instructions were found aboard a captured French vessel and brought to Boston, La Ronde was held in Boston until November.

Governor Vaudreuil was warned again in August that expeditions against Quebec and Montreal were being organised. He called out his militia, rallied local Indians, and prepared his defences as best he could, putting the whole colony on a war footing. In mid-October word reached Quebec that large ships were approaching, heightening tensions further. It turned out they were French, and on board was a scout Vaudreuil had sent downriver on 19 September to watch for the British fleet. The scout reported finding the wreckage of seven ships and an estimated 1,500 bodies. Although locals were already plundering through the wreckage, the colony organised a formal salvage operation that recovered items like anchors, chains, tents, and cannons; the items recovered were auctioned.

The citizens of Quebec changed the name of their oldest church from Notre-Dame de la Victoire (Our Lady of Victory) to Notre-Dame-des-Victoires (Our Lady of Victories).

== Land forces ==
- Queen's Royal Sea Service Foot (4th)
- Stanhope's Sea Service Foot (11th)
- Livesays' Sea Service Foot (12th)
- Handasyde's Sea Service Foot (22nd)
- Wetham's Sea Service Foot (27th) (Irish Establishment)
- Saunderson's 1st Marines (30th)
- Donegal's Marines (35th) (Irish Establishment)
- Charlemont's Sea Service Foot (36th) (Irish Establishment)
- Meredeth's Sea Service Foot (37th) (Irish Establishment)
- One company each from:
  - Villier's 2nd Marines (31st) (Irish Establishment)
  - Borr's 3rd Marines (32nd)
  - Mordaunts' Marines
  - Holt's Marines
  - Shannon's Marines
- Vetch's Regiment, Colonel Samuel Vetch (Massachusetts)
- Walton's Regiment, Colonel Shadrach Walton (New Hampshire-Rhode Island)

== Fleet ==
=== Warships ===
Ship	Guns	Commander	Notes	Ref.
HMS Edgar	70	Rear-Admiral of the White Sir Hovenden Walker; Captain George Paddon	Paddon was given command at Boston; exploded at Spithead 15 October	
HMS Swiftsure	70	Captain Joseph Soanes	Soanes, who had been captain of Edgar, took command of Swiftsure at Boston	
HMS Monmouth	70	Captain John Mitchell		
HMS Sunderland	60	Captain John Cockburn		
HMS Kingston	60	Captain Joseph Winder		
HMS Montague	60	Captain George Walton		
HMS Windsor	60	Captain Robert Arris	Arris was given command of Windsor at Boston. She carried General Hill's flag	
HMS Dunkirk	60	Captain Henry Gore	Previous commander, Captain Thomas Butler, dismissed 27 June	
HMS Leopard	50	Captain Isaac Cook		
HMS Enterprise	40	Captain Nicholas Smith		
HMS Sapphire	40	Captain Augustine Rouse		
HMS Lowestoffe	32	Captain George Gordon		
HMS Tryton Prize	30	Commander Richard Burlington		
HMS Basilisk	–	Commander Robert Harward	Bomb vessel	
HMS Granado	–	Commander James Grainger	Bomb vessel	
HMS Feversham	36	Captain Robert Paston	Detached convoying storeships from Virginia, lost in storm 7 October	
HMS Torbay	80	Captain James Moody	On detached service	
HMS Devonshire	80	Captain John Cooper	On detached service; Cooper was given command of Devonshire at Boston	
HMS Humber	80	Captain Richard Culliford	On detached service	
HMS Chester	50	Captain Thomas Mathews	On detached service	
HMS Diamond	40	Captain Tobias Lisle	On detached service	
HMS Bedford Galley	34	Captain Andrew Lay	On detached service	
HMS Experiment	40	Captain Matthew Elford	On detached service	

=== Other ships ===
The fleet is listed in the order of sail drawn up by Admiral Walker. Ships generally sailed two abreast.

Ship	Captain	Purpose	Notes
Recovery	John Lewis	Transport for General Hill's Regiment	
Reward	Matthew Lowth	Hospital ship	
Delight	Stephen Thomas	Transport for General Hill's Regiment	
Success Pink	Matthew Pink	Tender	
Fortune	John Jones	Transport for General Hill's Regiment	
Willing Mind	John Macmath	Transport for Kirk's Regiment	
Happy Union	Christopher Redshaw	Transport for Kirk's Regiment	
Rose	Henry Foster	Transport for Kirk's Regiment	
Queen Anne	George Tucker	Transport for Kirk's Regiment	
Lisle	Gregory Shipton	Transport for Kirk's Regiment	
Resolution	Matthew Gilieu	Transports for Clayton's Regiment	
Samuel	J. Whibbean	Transports for Clayton's Regiment	
Marlborough	James Taylour	Transports for Clayton's Regiment	Foundered on the rocks; 130 lost
Pheasant	J. Mason	Transports for Clayton's Regiment	
Three Martins	Robert Thompson	Transport for Kain's Regiment	
Globe	Michael King	Transport for Kain's Regiment	
Smyrna Merchant	Henry Vernon	Transport for Kain's Regiment	Foundered on the rocks; 200, including Master Vernon, were lost.
Samuel	Samuel Ferrier	Transport for Kain's Regiment	
Colchester	Jos. Hinning	Transports for Seymour's Regiment	Foundered on the rocks; 150 lost.
Samuel and Anne	Thomas Walkup	Transports for Seymour's Regiment	Foundered on the rocks; 142 lost.
Nathanael and Elizabeth	Magnus Howson	Transports for Seymour's Regiment	Foundered on the rocks; 10 lost.
George	Isaac Dove	Transports for Windresse's Regiment	
Blenheim	Thomas Simmons	Transports for Windresse's Regiment	
Isabella Anne Katharine	Richard Bayley	Transports for Windresse's Regiment	Foundered on the rocks; 192, including Master Bayley, were lost.
Chatham	J. Alexander	Transports for Windresse's Regiment	Foundered on the rocks; 192, including Master Bayley, were lost.
Blessing	Thomas Clark	Transport for Disney's Regiment	
Two Sheriffs	Luke Rogers	Transport for Disney's Regiment	
Rebecca	Samuel Adams	Transport for Disney's Regiment	
Sarah	George Story	Transport for Disney's Regiment	
Rebecca Anne Blessing	Richard Harman	Equipment transports	
Herbin (galley)	J. Weston	Equipment transports	
Prince Eugene	Charles Davis	Equipment transports	
Friends Increase	Cornelius Martin	Equipment transports	
Dolphin	Nenyon Masters	Equipment transports	
Marlborough	Edward Friend	Equipment transports	
Mary	Cheeseman Pearcy	Equipment transports	
Anna	Edward Smith	Provincial troop transports	
Anchor and Hope	J. Brewer	Provincial troop transports	
Jeremiah and Thomas	John Jenkins	Provincial troop transports	
Adventure	George Philips	Provincial troop transports	
Barbadoes	J. Rawlins	Provincial troop transports	
Content	William Hunt	Provincial troop transports	Foundered on the rocks; entire crew of 15 saved.
John and Mary	John Stephens	Tenders for General Hill	
Speedwell	Henry Davis	Tenders for General Hill	
Dolphin	Samuel Ems	Tenders for Admiral Walker	
Samuel	William Webber	Tenders for Admiral Walker	
Elizabeth	John Welsh Jr	Tenders for Admiral Walker	
Mary	William English	Tender for Admiral Walker	
Goodwill (sloop)	not listed	Tender for Colonel Vetch	
Anna	Edward Rotherford	Transports for provincial recruits	
John and Sarah	John Lawrence	Transports for provincial recruits	She was incorrectly listed as lost in early reports by Walker and Hill.
Margaret	John Dunn	Transports for provincial recruits	
Dispatch	Beamsly Perkins	Provincial troop transports	
Hannah and Elizabeth	John Venteman	Provincial troop transports	
Four Friends	Matthew Vybert	Provincial troop transports	
Friends Adventure	Henry Few	Provincial troop transports	
Francis	Walter Goodridge	Provincial troop transports	
Rebecca	Henry Richards	Provincial troop transports	
John and Hannah	Nathanael Marston	Provincial troop transports	
Martha and Hannah	Francis Norris	Provincial troop transports	
Henrietta	Richard Barrington	Provincial troop transports	
Johannah	John Vincale	Provincial troop transports	
Blessing	Samuel Long	Provincial troop transports	
Unity	John Richards	Hospital ship	
Antelope	John Anderson	Provincial troop transports	
Newcastle	Clement Deering	Provincial troop transports	
Sources, unless otherwise cited: Graham, pp. 229–231,237; Hervey, p. 318
