= Pointe-aux-Anglais =

Community in the city of Port-Cartier, Quebec, Canada

Coordinates: 49°40′38″N 67°10′05″W

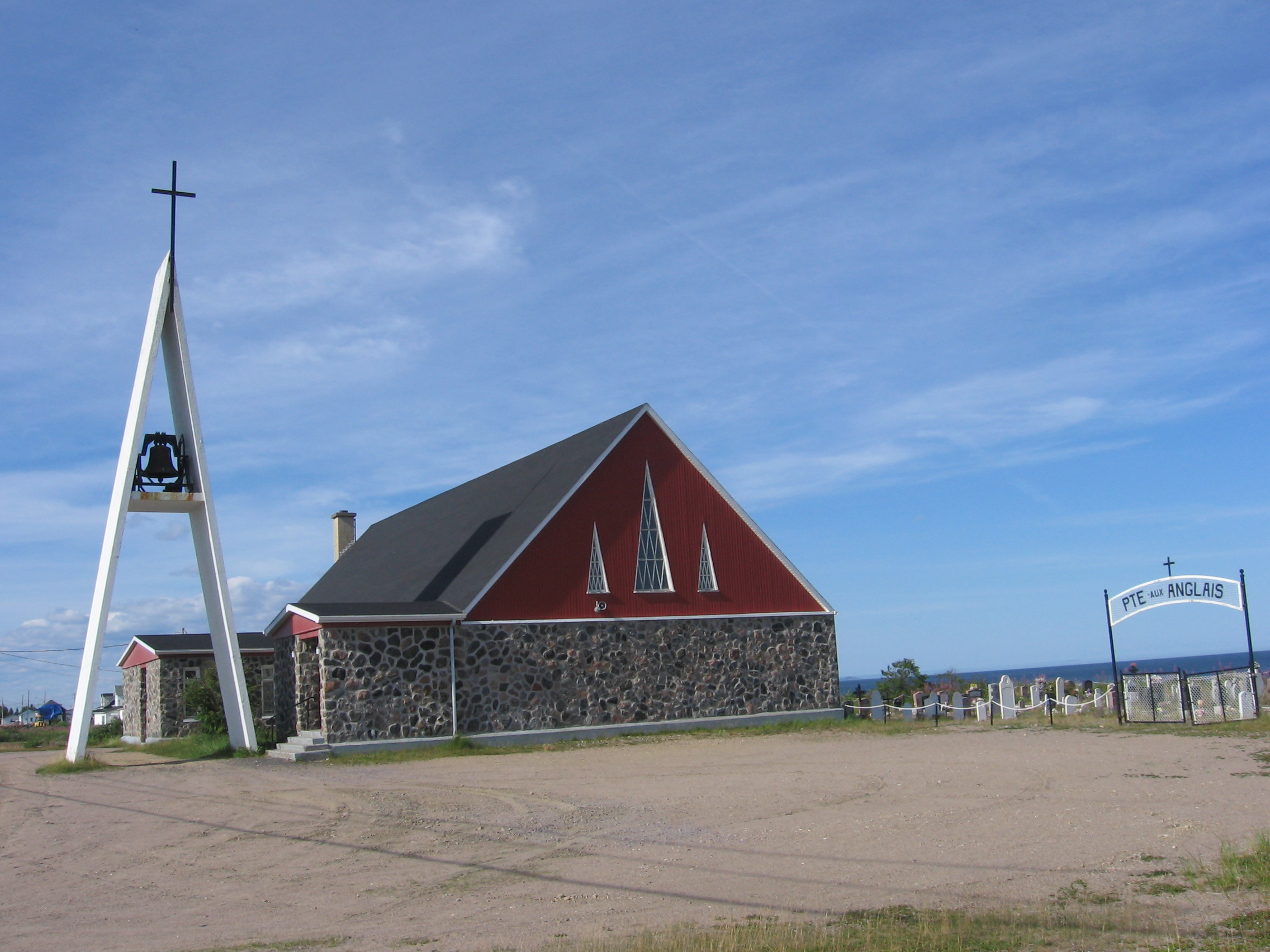
Saint-Paul-de-la-Pointe-aux-Anglais church, Pointe-aux-Anglais hamlet

Pointe-aux-Anglais (French pronunciation: [pwɛ̃t oz‿ɑ̃ɡlɛ]) is a hamlet located on the territory of the city of Port-Cartier, on the North shore of the Gulf of St. Lawrence, in Côte-Nord region, Sept-Rivières RCM, Quebec, Canada.

== History ==
Inside the Roman Catholic Church of the parish of Saint-Paul-de-la-Pointe-aux-Anglais, the Stations of the Cross, is a work of art of famous sculptor Médard Bourgault (1897-1967) of Saint-Jean-Port-Joli.

In 1711, a large fleet commanded by Admiral Walker was sent from England to take Quebec. Due to fog on the St. Lawrence, eight ships grounded on the lle-aux-Oeuf reefs and went down with more than 900 men in one of the worst naval disasters in British history. The point of land just across from the reefs was named Pointe-aux-Anglais to commemorate the ill-fated expedition. It comprises the sectors of Pointe-aux-Anglais and Rivière-Pentecôte. An ecomuseum in Pointe-aux-Anglais explains how the English failed in their attempt to attack Quebec.
