= Goldthwait Sea =

Prehistoric sea on the coast of eastern Canada

- Location within Quebec

- Gulf of Saint Lawrence today
- Location: Gulf of Saint Lawrence and surroundings
- Coordinates: 48°N 62°W
- Basin countries: Canada

The Goldthwait Sea was a sea that emerged during the last deglaciation, starting around 13,000 years ago, covering what is now the Gulf of Saint Lawrence and surrounding areas. At that time, the land had been depressed under the weight of the Laurentide Ice Sheet, which was up to 2 kilometres (1.2 mi) thick. Areas on the Anticosti Island and low-lying regions of Quebec and the Maritimes bordering the Saint Lawrence were below sea level. As the land rebounded over the next 3,000 years, despite rising sea levels the sea retreated to roughly the present boundaries of the Gulf.

== Name ==
The term "Goldthwait Sea" was proposed by Elson in 1969 to distinguish the area from the Champlain Sea and the Laflamme Sea. The sea is named after the geologist James Walter Goldthwait (1880–1947). He did impressive work for the Geological Survey of Canada in the east of the country, and in Quebec in particular, despite handicaps such as lack of aerial photographs or detailed topographical maps. The quality of his observations and his insights were remarkable.

== Overall process ==
Formation of the Goldthwait Sea was part of a broader process in what is now eastern Canada towards the end of the Last Glacial Period. The atmosphere was warmer near the oceans and towards the south, so melting of the Laurentide Ice Sheet progressed from east to west and from south to north. Around 12,000 years ago the Saint Lawrence Valley was opened to sea waters, The western arm of the Goldthwait Sea quickly extended up the Saint Lawrence, and this was followed by the Champlain Sea invasion. Three factors affected the area of the sea: the retreat of the ice sheet, isostatic rebound by the land and the rising sea level.

The final retreat of the Laurentide Ice Sheet from eastern North America occurred between 12,000 and 10,000 years age. Freed from the pressure of the ice sheet, the land began to rise, and the shores of the seas retreated. This post-glacial rebound (or isostatic rebound) continues today. Isostatic rebound was rapid at first, and 85% of the coastal area had emerged by 9,000 years ago. 13,000 years ago the rate of rebound was 3 centimetres (1.2 in) per year. Today it continues, but has slowed to 1 millimetre (0.039 in) per year.

Large amounts of fresh water, including melted ice and precipitation, flowed into the North Atlantic Ocean during the deglaciation. Water was released from the glacial Lake St Lawrence around 11,000 years ago, and from the glacial Lake Agassiz between 10,900 and 9,900 years ago. Renewed warming caused run-off from the glacial Lake Agassiz and Lake Barlow-Ojibway between 9,500 and 8,000 years ago. The water seems to have flowed out into the ocean without mixing with the salt water in the depths of the Goldthwait Sea.

== Chronology ==
The Goldthwait Sea, defined as the late-Glacial and post-Glacial invasion of the sea into Saint Lawrence estuary east of Quebec City and the Gulf of Saint Lawrence, began around 14,000 years ago. This was when the ice sheet was first withdrawn from the Gulf of Saint Lawrence. At that time the global sea level was about 55 metres (180 ft) lower than it is today. The sea was able to cover the coastal areas of the Saint Lawrence because the land had subsided under the burden of the ice sheet. After this, sea levels gradually rose as water from the ice sheet was returned to the ocean, but at the same time the land rebounded, causing a complex sequence of submersion. There were two main phases, a short phase of sea invasion as soon as the ice sheet moved back from the coast, and a much longer phase of retreat as the continent rose isostatically, a process that is not yet fully complete.

Dionne (1977) proposes three major episodes: Lower Goldthwaitian 13,500 to 12,000 years ago, Middle Goldthwaitian 12,000 to 9,000 years ago, and Upper Goldthwaitian, 9,000 years ago until the present. Complicating the picture is that deglaciation did not occur at the same time throughout the region, so the sea reached the south and east of the area before it reached the west and north. To allow for regional variations in the timing of events, Dionne therefore proposes calling the phases Goldthwaitian I, II and III.

In the first phase, lasting 500 to 1,500 years, the sea followed the retreating glacier front. The waters were cold and salinity low, and the sea was often ice-covered. The sea may have been prevented from entering some of the valleys by lingering ice. Isostatic recovery began in this phase. In the second phase, lasting for 2,000 to 3,000 years, the sea first advanced and then retreated. During this phase isostatic uplift was rapid, but sea levels were also rising. There was much sedimentation along the shoreline, with deltas formed at the mouths of the main rivers on the north shore fed by meltwater from the ice sheet on the Laurentian Shield. The waters were still cold, but warmer and more saline than before. The third phase, lasting from 9,000 or 8,000 years ago until the present, was one of the sea slowly retreating. Isostatic recovery slowed to a few millimeters per year, but sea level rises were also small. Around 5,500 years ago the last of the ice sheet vanished from the center of Quebec. During this phase streams cut channels through the sediments laid down in the previous phase.

== Changes in extent ==
The Goldthwait Sea began to form in the Saint Lawrence Estuary and Gulf around 13,500 years ago. By 9,300 years age the ice front had retreated about 8 kilometres (5.0 mi) from the present shoreline in the north coast region between Rivière-Pentecôte and Sept-Îles, as shown by a belt of end moraines. The present coastal plain was covered by the Goldthwait Sea. Over the next 400 years the ice completely withdrew from the area, and the sea grew to its maximum size, with a coast parallel to the present coast but about 15 kilometres (9.3 mi) inland. Some fjords reached 70 kilometres (43 mi) further inland.

The sea covered about 25,000 square kilometres (9,700 sq mi) of what is now Quebec, including Anticosti Island, the south of the Saint Lawrence between Lévis and Baie-Saint-Paul, and the north shore between Les Escoumins and Blanc-Sablon. Many shorelines can be seen at different elevations in the area that was once submerged. The limit of land once covered by the Goldthwait Sea varies from 100 metres (330 ft) above the present sea level at Godbout, Quebec to 130 metres (430 ft) at Sept-Îles further to the northeast. The difference can be partly accounted for by the ice cap having retreated earlier in the southern area, which would have rebounded further before the sea levels rose. There must have also been a thicker ice sheet further north, depressing the land further.

== Sedimentary evidence ==
The bed of the Goldthwait sea had inter-layered coarse sands and silty clays around its margins, and massive light gray fine clays further down. Rebound has exposed these sediments along the Saint Lawrence river and estuary. The bed of the Upper Saint Lawrence Estuary has glacial tills and bedrock covered by upwards of 200 metres (660 ft) of bluish-gray marine clays dating to the Goldthwait age. Three type of sediment can be seen along the Quebec coast. Silt and clay were deposited in deep water where river currents had no influence, deltaic sands were deposited where currents carried sediment into the sea, and as the sea receded a blanket of coastal sand was deposited over both these types of sediment. Tidal flat clays are also found in some backwater areas of the sea.

== Sources ==
- Desaulniers, Francis (14 October 2012), "Québec's Postglacial Seas", The Canadian Encyclopedia
- Dionne, Jean-Claude (1977), "La mer de Goldthwait au Québec / The Goldthwait Sea in Québec" (PDF), Géographie Physique et Quaternaire (Troisième Colloque sur le Quaternaire du Québec : 1re partie) (in French), 31 (1–2), doi:10.7202/1000055ar
- Dredge, L.A. (1976), "The Goldthwait Sea and its Sediments: Godbout – Sept-Iles Region, Quebec North Shore" (PDF), Report of Activities Part C, Geological Survey Commission of Canada
- Ramesh, R.; d'Anglejan, B. (Autumn 1995), "Mineralogy, Chemistry and Particle Size Interrelationships in some Post- Glacial Marine Deposits of the St. Lawrence Lowlands", Journal of Coastal Research, 11 (4), Coastal Education & Research Foundation, Inc.: 1167–1179, JSTOR 4298420
- Rodrigues, Cyril G.; Vilks, Gustavs (1994), "The impact of glacial lake runoff on the goldthwait and champlain seas: The relationship between glacial lake agassiz runoff and the younger dryas", Quaternary Science Reviews, 13 (9–10): 923–944, Bibcode:1994QSRv...13..923R, doi:10.1016/0277-3791(94)90009-4
- Weddle, Thomas K.; Retelle, Michael J. (2000), Deglacial History and Relative Sea-level Changes, Northern New England and Adjacent Canada, Geological Society of America, ISBN 978-0-8137-2351-8
