= Rivière-Pentecôte =

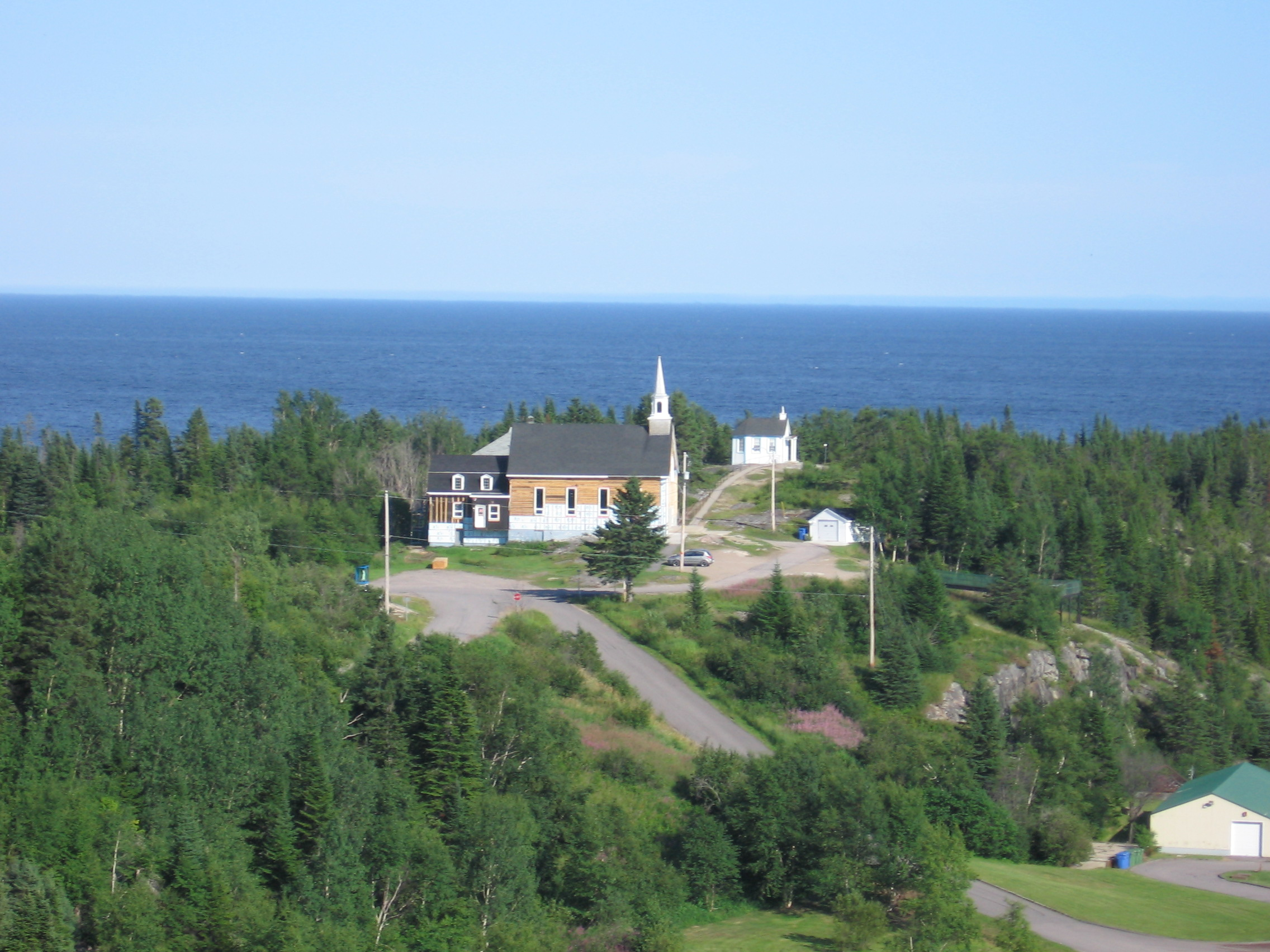
- Rivière-Pentecôte

- Location within Quebec
- Coordinates: 49.785125°N 67.160979°W
- Country: Canada
- Province: Quebec
- RCM: Sept-Rivières
- Town: Port-Cartier

Rivière-Pentecôte (French pronunciation: [ʁivjɛʁ pɑ̃tkot]) is a village on the north shore of the Gulf of Saint Lawrence, part of the township of Port-Cartier.

== Location ==
Rivière-Pentecôte is an administrative sector of the town of Port-Cartier, Sept-Rivières, Quebec. It is on the north shore of the Gulf of Saint Lawrence between Quebec Route 138 and the Pointe de la Rivière. The Riverin River flows through the town. The larger Pentecôte River enters the Saint Lawrence just south of the village. This name is attributed to Jacques Cartier, who arrived in the area on the Christian holy day of Pentecost in 1535. Pentecôte is French for Pentecost. There is a reference to the river in a document by Louis Jolliet from 1685 in which he refers to a river named "Pannecoste".

The Pentecôte weather station is operated by the Ministry of Sustainable Development, Environment, and Fight Against Climate Change (MDDELCC). It reports that the average annual temperature is 1.9 °C (35.4 °F) and the average annual rainfall is 1,154 millimetres (45.4 in).

== History ==
In 1875 a mission called Saint-Patrice-de-la-Rivière-Pentecôte was established some 100 km south-west of Sept-Îles at the mouth of the Pentecôte River. In 1884, the Penticost River Post Office opened, renamed to the French form Rivière-Pentecôte in 1933. At the end of the 19th century, it was among the most important industrial centres along the North Shore. The first newspaper in the region, L'Écho du Labrador, was published in 1903 in Rivière-Pentecôte by Eudist father Joseph Laizé.

In 1972 the Municipality of Rivière-Pentecôte was formed out of unorganized territory. On 19 February 2003 the Municipality of Rivière-Pentecôte was amalgamated into the Town of Port-Cartier.

== Rivers ==
The Pentecôte River is an important river in the Port-Cartier–Sept-Îles Wildlife Reserve. It originates in Lake Bourgeois, one of the lakes along the route of the Cartier Railway, and flows southeast to enter the Gulf of Saint Lawrence just west of the community of Rivière-Pentecôte. The Riverin River flows under Quebec Route 138 and into the Saint Lawrence through the community of Rivière-Pentecôte.

Just east of Route 138 the 6 metres (20 ft) high Barrage de la Rivière-Riverin retains a head of 3.4 metres (11 ft) and holds 180,999 cubic metres (6,391,900 cu ft) in a 10.6 hectares (26 acres) reservoir. It is a concrete structure 90.5 metres (297 ft) long on a rock foundation that was built in 1946. The present 2.01 MW power plant is owned by Pouvoir Riverin and Algonquin Power Fund (Canada) and came into operation in 1999.

== Sources ==
- Aménagements hydroélectriques selon les régions administratives et les bassins versants (in French), Énergie et des Ressources naturelles Québec, archived from the original on 2019-08-23
- "Portrait du bassin versant Pentecôte", Secteur d’étude Sept-Rivières (PDF), OBV Duplessis
- Rivière-Pentecôte (municipalité) (in French), Commission de toponymie du Québec
- Rivière-Pentecôte, Natural Resources Canada
- Rivière Pentecôte, Commission de toponymie du Québec
- Rivière Pentecôte, Natural Resources Canada
- Rivière-Riverin, Barrage de la, Ministère de l'Environnement et de la Lutte contre les changements climatiques
- Rivière Riverin, Natural Resources Canada
