= Hovenden Walker =

17/18th-century British naval officer

Rear-Admiral Sir Hovenden Walker
- Born: 1656 or 1666
- Died: 1725 or 1728
- Military career
- Allegiance: Kingdom of Great Britain
- Branch: Royal Navy
- Rank: Rear-Admiral
- Commands: HMS Foresight; Jamaica Station
- Conflicts: Queen Anne's War

Rear-Admiral Sir Hovenden Walker (1656 or 1666 – 1725 or 1728) was a British naval officer noted for, during Queen Anne's War, having led an abortive 1711 expedition against Quebec City, then the capital of New France.

== Early career ==
Walker entered Trinity College Dublin in 1678 but did not take a degree and subsequently joined the Royal Navy. He probably visited North America in 1686, reaching Boston aboard the frigate HMS Dartmouth.

Walker was promoted to captain about 1692 and saw action near the Lizard while in command of the fourth-rate HMS Foresight in around 1696. In 1701 he joined the fleet under Sir George Rooke at Cádiz, and shortly afterwards, as commodore, took command of a detachment charged with cooperating in an attack on Guadeloupe and Martinique, which was unsuccessful. This failure did not damage his career, though; in 1706 he assisted in the relief of Barcelona, and two years later was appointed to command the squadron before Dunkirk. In March 1711 he was promoted to rear-admiral and was also given a knighthood.

== Expedition to Canada ==
On 3 April 1711, the new rear-admiral of the white squadron was made commander-in-chief of a secret naval expedition aimed at the conquest of New France. His expedition was to attack Quebec in combination with a land expedition led by Colonel Francis Nicholson.

On 30 July, the expedition consisting of nine ships of war, two bomb vessels and 60 transports and tenders, British and colonial, with some 7,500 troops and marines aboard set sail from Boston. On the morning of 18 August, just as the expedition was about to enter the Saint Lawrence River, the wind began to blow hard from the northwest, and Walker was forced to seek shelter in Gaspé Bay. On the morning of the 20th, the wind veered to the southeast, and he was able to advance slowly past the western extremity of Anticosti Island before it died down and thick fog blanketed both shore and fleet. By the 22nd, the wind had freshened from the southeast, and there were intermittent breaks in the fog, but not sufficient to give sight of land. After consulting his pilots, Walker gave the signal to head the fleet southward.

Walker had thought he was in mid-stream when he issued the order. In fact, he was about seven leagues north of his proper course, and in the grasp of strong currents which steered his ships towards the northwest. Aided by an easterly wind, the fleet was gradually closing on the "North Shore," which in the vicinity of Île-aux-Oeufs (Egg Island) runs almost north and south. When a captain reported that land had been sighted, presumably dead ahead, Walker assumed that he was approaching the south shore, and ordered the fleet to wear, and bring-to on the other tack. Not many minutes later he was again summoned from his bed, and hurrying upon deck in dressing gown and slippers saw breakers "all round us." By that time the whole fleet was heading for the "North Shore," or more accurately, the coast to the westward; ships in the van were already plunging on the edge of the breakers.

Once recovered from the shock, Walker made all available sail, and stood from the shore towards mid-channel. Up to this time a gale had been blowing almost directly on shore, and had it continued it is doubtful if many of the fleet could have survived. However, in the early morning of the next day, the wind dropped, and this lull was followed by a shift of wind which enabled most of the ships to slip their anchors and escape the shoals on either quarter. Altogether, seven transports and one storeship were lost. Out of a total of 1,390 on the 8 lost ships, 740 soldiers (including 35 women attached to the regiments) and probably 150 sailors were either drowned or died from exposure on shore. Walker cruised in the neighbourhood of Île-aux-Oeufs for two days in an effort to save what men and stores he could. Then, following a council of war, he decided to abandon the assault on Quebec.

== Later life ==
Walker returned to London in October 1711, where he was not censured for his conduct in the expedition. In 1712 he was appointed commodore of the Jamaica Station. He returned a year later to England. Walker's journal, recounting the events of 1711, was published in 1720 and was edited by Gerald S. Graham and re-published jointly by the Champlain Society and the Navy Records Society in 1953.

== See also ==
- List of Trinity College Dublin people

== Sources ==
- Cundall, Frank (1915). Historic Jamaica. West India Committee.

Military offices
Preceded by James Littleton	Commander-in-Chief, Jamaica Station; 1712	Succeeded by Vacant (Next held by Edward Vernon)
