= Le Petit Bras (Amédée River tributary) =

Location
- Country: Canada
- Province: Quebec
- Region: Côte-Nord
- MRC: Manicouagan Regional County Municipality
- City: Baie-Comeau

Physical characteristics
- Source: Little Lake
  - location: Baie-Comeau
  - coordinates: 49°15′55″N 68°14′47″W
  - elevation: 187 m (614 ft)
- Mouth: Amédée River
  - location: Baie-Comeau
  - coordinates: 49°12′05″N 68°15′03″W
  - elevation: 50 m (160 ft)
- Length: 11.8 km (7.3 mi)

Basin features
- Tributaries
  - right: Stream (coming from North-West)

Le Petit Bras (English: The Little Arm) is a tributary of the Amédée River, crossing the town of Baie-Comeau, in the Manicouagan Regional County Municipality, in the administrative region of the Côte-Nord, in the province of Quebec, in Canada.

The upper part of this valley is mainly served by the route 389; the lower part, by route 138.

Besides the industrial area and the urban area at the end of the segment, forestry is the main economic activity in this valley.

The surface of the Amédée River is usually frozen from the beginning of December to the end of March, except the rapids areas; however, traffic on the ice is generally safe from mid-December to mid-March.

== Geography ==
The Petit Bras rises from a small lake (length: 0.3 km (0.19 mi); altitude: 187 m (614 ft)). This lake is located at:

- 2.7 km (1.7 mi) west of Castelnau Lake;
- 4.5 km (2.8 mi) west of lac à la Chasse (Baie-Comeau);
- 7.1 km (4.4 mi) north-west of the mouth of Le Petit Bras.

Le Petit Bras flows on 11.8 km (7.3 mi) with a drop of 137 m (449 ft), according to the following segments:

- 0.7 km (0.43 mi) first towards the south, then towards the northwest where it intersects the route 389, up to a bend of the river corresponding to a stream (coming from the northwest);
- 4.8 km (3.0 mi) first forming a hook towards the south, then towards the south-east by collecting a stream (coming from the south) and three streams (coming from the north) to a bend in the river where the current turns east, crossing a marsh area before flowing south into Petit Bras Lake;
- 2.1 km (1.3 mi) towards the south by crossing on 1.6 km (0.99 mi) the lake Petit Bras (altitude: 69 m (226 ft)) over its full length; then crossing a small lake on 0.4 km (0.25 mi) where the current turns south, to its mouth;
- 1.4 km (0.87 mi) south-west passing from the west side of the Jean-Noël-Tessier industrial park, to a stream (coming from the north-west);
- 2.8 km (1.7 mi) to the southeast by crossing route 138 to a bend in the river where the current turns southwest, until its mouthpiece.

The Petit Bras flows on the northeast bank of the Amédée River, that is to say:

- 5.4 km (3.4 mi) north-east of the mouth of the Manicouagan River;
- 1.9 km (1.2 mi) north-west of the mouth of the Amédée River.

== Toponymy ==
The toponym "Le Petit Bras" was formalized on August 2, 1974, at the Place Names Bank of the Commission de toponymie du Québec.

== See also ==
- Gulf of St. Lawrence, a stream
- List of rivers of Quebec
