= Arthur A. Schmon =

Canadian industrialist

Arthur Albert Schmon
- Born: 10 May 1895; Newark, New Jersey
- Died: 18 March 1964 (aged 68); Chicago, Illinois
- Resting place: Victoria Lawn Cemetery, St Catharines
- Occupation: Executive
- Known for: Development of Baie-Comeau, Quebec

Arthur Albert Schmon (10 May 1895 – 18 March 1964) was an American-born executive who became a leading figure in the paper industry of Ontario and Quebec. He oversaw construction of the first power plant and paper mill in Baie-Comeau, Quebec. He also played a central role in founding Brock University in St. Catharines, Ontario, where he made his home.

== Early years ==
Arthur Albert Schmon was born on 10 May 1895 in Newark, New Jersey. He was the son of German immigrants, Peter Schmon, a baker, and Wilhelmina (Minnie) Schaefer. He studied at Barringer High School in Newark, where he became class president, and where he met Eleanore Celeste Reynolds, whom he would marry in August 1919. He went on to Princeton University, New Jersey, where he studied English Literature. He graduated from Princeton in 1917 with a B.A. degree.

Upon graduation, Schmon moved to artillery-training in France in July 1917, where, as a second lieutenant in the US Army First Infantry Division, he met Major (later Colonel) Robert R. McCormick (1880–1955), owner of the Chicago Tribune. McCormick was struck by his initiative and promoted him to regimental adjutant.

Schmon came to McCormick's attention in January 1918, when McCormick needed a person to lead a patrol along the road ahead: "Some fellows were making bread pills, some were looking at their plates and some were just looking around. I just saw one pair of dark eyes looking at me and said ‘What is your name?’ ‘Second Lieutenant Schmon, sir.’ ‘You take the patrol.’ That marked him out for me.” The young second lieutenant must have impressed McCormick with his coolness under stress. This cool, almost laconic attitude is illustrated in Schmon's war-time diary, and is quoted in Wiegman's book. “The major and I made a reconnaissance of the front lines. The Germans saw us walking along the road and landed a few shells near us. .....[O]n the way back the Germans shelled Rocquencourt. A fragment of shell landed about a foot away from us.”

McCormick was promoted to lieutenant colonel and moved on to other assignments, but wrote a recommendation that Schmon be promoted to first lieutenant. In his recommendation, McCormick noted that Schmon “has given great satisfaction ..... He is courageous, intelligent, and a tireless worker, and has good command over men and maintains good discipline.” At the end of World War I, Arthur Schmon was promoted to captain, and he continued to carry that title into the 1930s.

While he was still in France, Schmon received a letter from Colonel McCormick, dated Chicago, December 31, 1918. The letter begins, “My dear Schmon” and continues to describe the position of manager of the Chicago Tribune property on the north shore of the Gulf of St. Lawrence. The manager would be expected to live at the site “from about May1 to December” and to visit once in the winter. “The work will be entirely new to you but I have no reason to doubt you can learn that as well as you learned artillery. The opportunities are very great. The difficulties also far from inconsiderable. ... If you should happen to want this, please write me at once.” Schmon spoke about this event in an address to the Newcomen Society in 1962: “Colonel McCormick offered me the job of managing the Shelter Bay plant and I accepted, pleading my inadequacies. I told him I didn't know the difference between a spruce and a balsam. McCormick agreed that this was a fundamental deficiency but allowed that I had some qualities that might offset this. .... So, after being married, I brought my bride – at her insistence – to the lonely outpost of Shelter Bay in the fall of 1919.”

== Career with Tribune Company ==
Schmon's job was manager of forestry operations at Shelter Bay, Quebec (Port-Cartier). The Shelter Bay pulpwood operation was in a remote outpost near the mouth of the Saint Lawrence River. Shelter Bay was originally named Rocky River, was renamed by McCormick on his first trip there on October 16, 1925. “If we call this place Rocky River no ship captain will come in here to get our wood. Let's call it Shelter Bay.” Schmon had no engineering expertise, but had the drive to overcome any obstacles. Shelter Bay could only be reached by dogsled for six months of the year, and when Schmon and his wife arrived in August 1919 they moved into a log cabin. In 1923 Schmon was appointed director of Woodlands for Quebec and Ontario Paper. In 1933 he became president of this company.

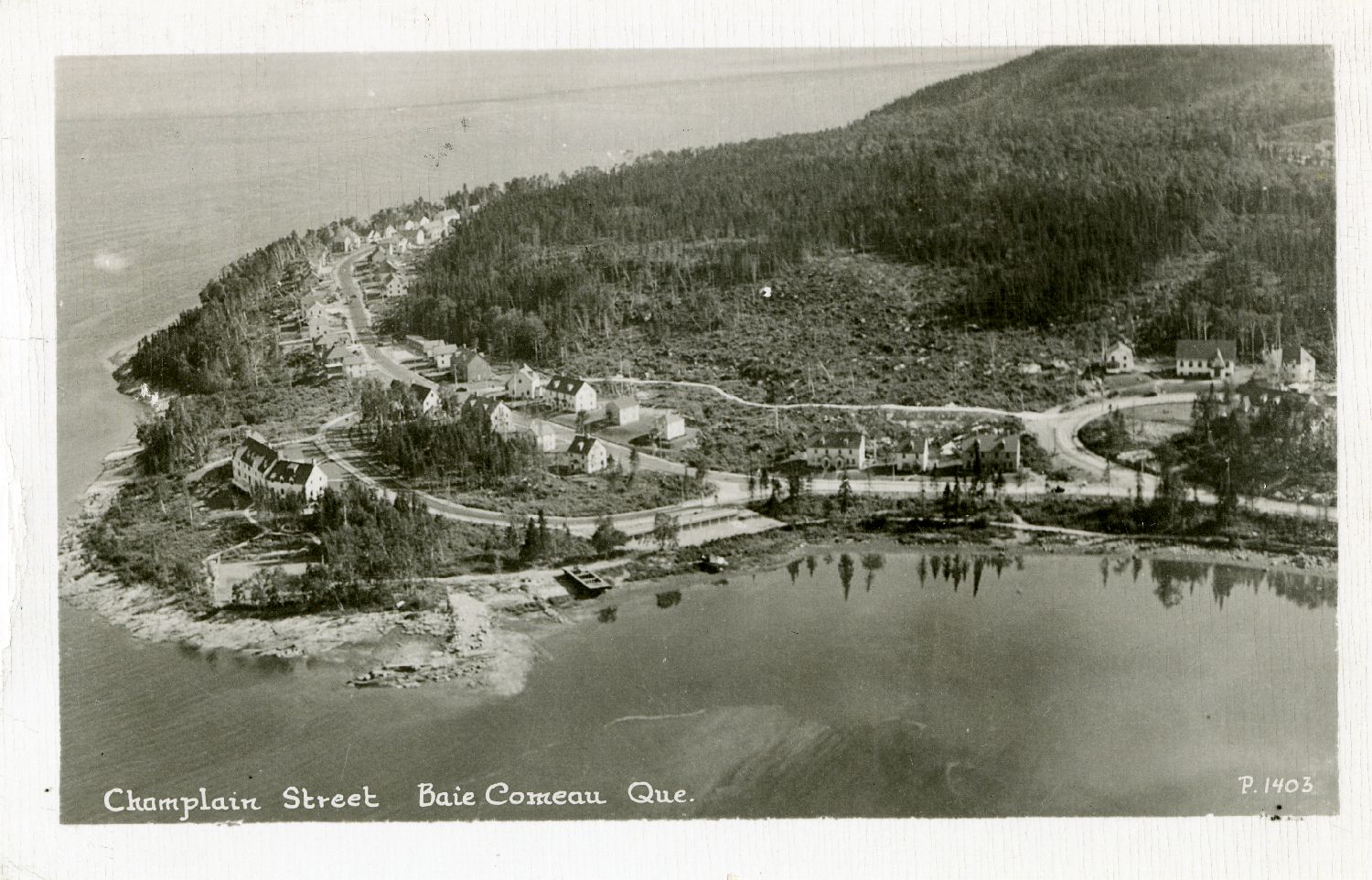
Rue Champlain, Baie-Comeau, 1930

In 1936 Schmon oversaw construction of McCormick's Baie-Comeau hydroelectric plant and factory. Construction of the power station, mill and town allowed year-round operation. Schmon became president and general manager of the Quebec North Shore Paper Company when it was incorporated in 1938 as the Tribune's newsprint subsidiary in Quebec. He became chief executive officer and board chairman of the Quebec and Ontario Transportation Company, and sat on the board of several related companies.

Colonel McCormick died in 1955 and made Schmon a trustee of the McCormickPatterson Trust in his will. The trust controlled the Tribune Company, publisher of five newspapers. In 1963 Schmon became chairman of the board of directors of Quebec and Ontario Paper. At the time of his death Schmon was chairman and chief executive officer of the Ontario Paper Company of Thorold, Ontario, and a director of the Tribune Company.

== Other activities ==
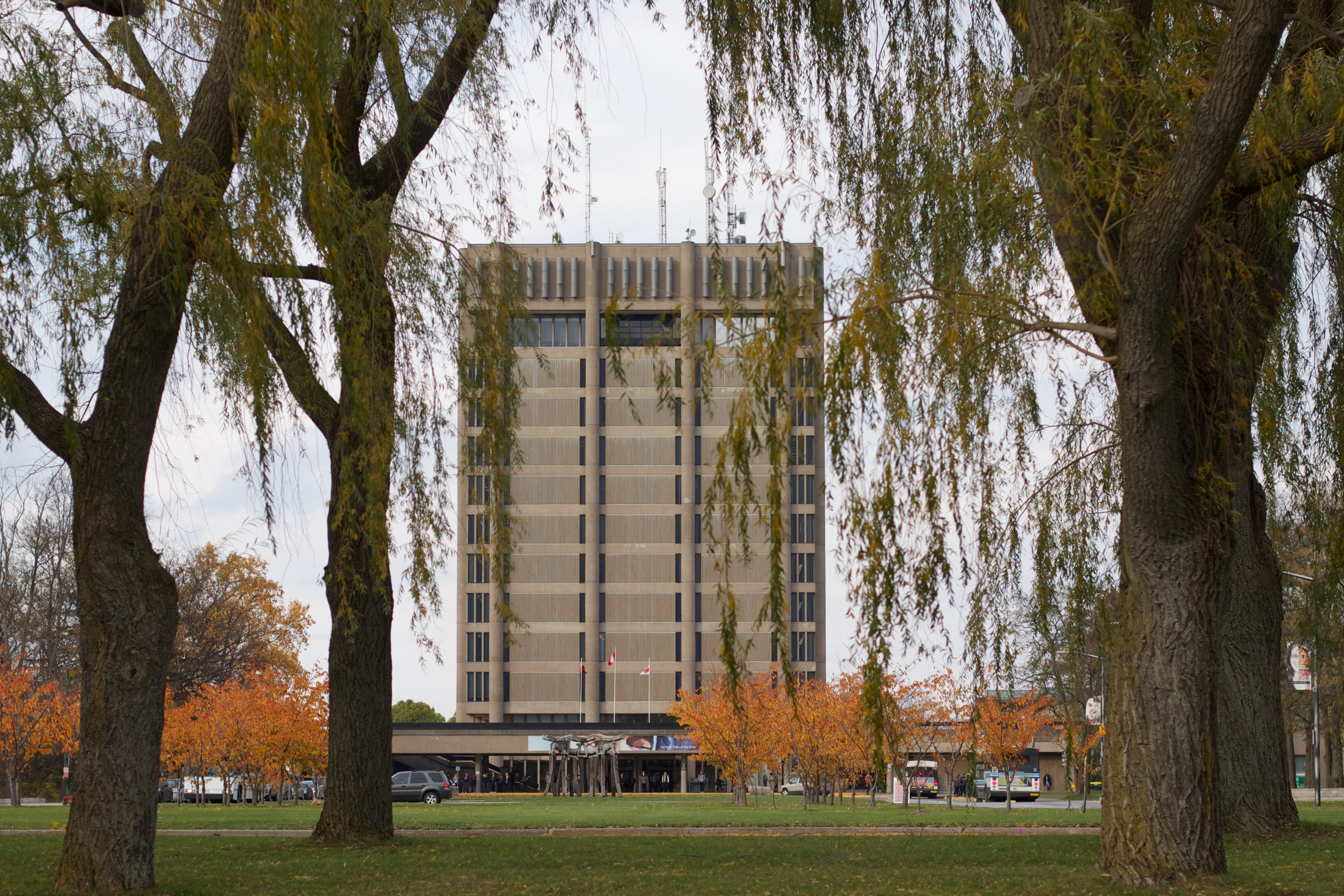
Arthur Schmon Tower, Brock University, St. Catharines

Schmon settled in St. Catharines, Ontario. He was a member of the Brock University Founders' Committee, and was the driving force behind establishing this university in the Niagara region. He was chairman of the St. Catharines Hospital board of governors for over 15 years, and in this role oversaw a $3 million expansion of the hospital. Schmon was also involved with Ridley College and McMaster University, Hamilton. He was founder and past president of the Princeton Alumni Association of Canada and a member of Princeton's executive committee.

== Death and legacy ==
Schmon died of lung cancer on 18 March 1964, in the Drake Hotel, Chicago. Arthur was succeeded by his son, Robert McCormick (Bob) Schmon, as president of Ontario Paper and Quebec North Shore Paper.

The Arthur Schmon Tower, built in 1968, is the main building of Brock University. Lake Arthur, about 100 kilometres (62 mi) northwest of Post-Cartier in the Port-Cartier–Sept-Îles Wildlife Reserve, is named after Arthur A. Schmon. There is a Schmon River with its source in Lac au Vent and Lake Aux Mouches which flows south for almost 90 kilometres (56 mi) to Lake Walker. It was called Rivière aux Rochers Nord-Ouest until 1975, when it was renamed in honor of Schmon. The river flows through Lake Schmon close to its source. Baie-Comeau has an Avenue Arthur-A.-Schmon and a Belvédère Arthur-A.-Schmon.

== Sources ==
- Arthur A. Schmon fonds RG 524, Brock University
- "Arthur A, Schmon of Ontario Paper; Newsprint Executive Dies—Chicago Tribune Director", New York Times, 19 March 1964
- Arthur Schmon Tower, Brock University
- Avenue Arthur-A.-Schmon (in French), Commission de toponymie du Québec
- Belvédère Arthur-A.-Schmon (in French), Commission de toponymie du Québec
- Lac Schmon (in French), Commission de toponymie du Québec
- "Papermill Unions to Hold Dance and Dinner on October 28", Niagara Falls Gazette, 16 October 1934
- Réserve faunique de Port‑Cartier–Sept‑Îles, Portrait, Sépaq
- Rivière Schmon (in French), Commission de toponymie du Québec
- Schmon, Arthur Albert (1963), Papermakers and Pioneers: the Ontario Paper Company Limited and Quebec North Shore Paper Company, New York: The Newcomen Society in North America
- Smith, Richard Norton (19 February 2003), The Colonel: The Life and Legend of Robert R. McCormick, 1880-1955, Northwestern University Press, ISBN 978-0-8101-2039-6
- Wiegman, Carl (1953), Trees to News: a Chronicle of the Ontario Paper Company's Origin and Development, Toronto: McClelland & Stewart
