= Lac à la Chasse (Baie-Comeau) =

Lake in Quebec, Canada

Coordinates: 49°15′04″N 68°10′57″W

- Location within Quebec
- Location: Baie-Comeau, Manicouagan Regional County Municipality, Côte-Nord, Quebec, Canada
- Primary inflows: (clockwise from the mouth) Lac Long outlet (coming from the northwest), rivière à la Chasse, outlet of two small lakes (coming from the west), stream (coming from the north), stream (from the north), stream (from the east).
- Primary outflows: Rivière à la Chasse
- Basin countries: Canada
- Max. length: 4.0 kilometres (2.5 mi)
- Max. width: 1.9 kilometres (1.2 mi)
- Surface elevation: 52 metres (171 ft)
- Islands: 5
- Settlements: Baie-Comeau

The lac à la Chasse is a freshwater body of the watershed of the rivière à la Chasse, located in the territory of the city of Baie-Comeau, in the Manicouagan Regional County Municipality, in the administrative region of Côte-Nord, in the province of Quebec, Canada.

The east side of Lac à la Chasse is served by Comeau Boulevard (route 138) and the southwest side by the Trans-Quebec-Labrador route (route 389).

Forestry is the main economic activity around the lake.

== Geography ==
Lac à la Chasse is located in the eastern part of the territory of the town of Baie-Comeau. This deformed lake is crossed to the south by the rivière à la Chasse. This lake has a length of 4.0 km (2.5 mi), a maximum width of 1.9 km (1.2 mi) and an altitude of 52 m (171 ft). This lake has a dam erected at its mouth. This lake is divided into two parts separated by a strait of a hundred meters in its center, because of a peninsula attached to the eastern shore and stretching for about 0.76 km (0.47 mi) towards the west and another peninsula attached to the west bank.

The northern part has three main bays, two of which stretch north. The southern part has seven main bays.

From the mouth of Lac à la Chasse, the current descends on 5.2 km (3.2 mi) to the south, then to the east, following the course of the rivière à la Chasse, to flow onto the north shore of Manicouagan Bay, on the north shore of the estuary of Saint Lawrence.

== Toponymy ==
The toponym "lac à la Chasse" was formalized on December 5, 1968 at the Place Names Bank of the Commission de toponymie du Québec.

== See also ==
- Manicouagan Regional County Municipality
- Baie-Comeau, a city
- Rivière à la Chasse, a stream
- Gulf of St. Lawrence, a stream
- List of rivers of Quebec
