= Lake Aux Mouches =

Lake in Quebec, Canada

- Lac Aux Mouches (French)
- Location within Quebec Location within Canada
- Coordinates: 51.0075°N 67.32806°W -->
- Primary outflows: Schmon River
- Basin countries: Canada
- Surface elevation: 563 metres (1,847 ft)

Lake Aux Mouches (French: Lac aux Mouches: Fly Lake) is a lake in the Côte-Nord region of the province of Quebec, Canada.

== Location ==
Lake Aux Mouches is in the unorganized territory of Lac-Walker in Sept-Rivières Regional County Municipality, Quebec. The lake is elongated, about 3.2 kilometres (2.0 mi) from north to south and 0.9 kilometres (0.56 mi) from east to west at its widest point. The surface elevation is 563 metres (1,847 ft). As of November 2021 the Commission de toponymie du Québec had not determined the origin or meaning of the name.

== Hydrology ==
The Schmon River has its source in Lac au Vent and Lac aux Mouches. It flows south for almost 90 kilometres (56 mi) to Lake Walker. Lac au Vent has outlets to Lac a la Pluie and Lac aux Mouches. From Lac aux Mouches the river flows south through Lac Flambeau and Lac Schmon, then onwards to the Gulf of St. Lawrence. There are rapids in the river immediately below its exit from the lake.

== Sources ==
- Fleury, Éric (2013), Plan d'aménagement forestier intégré opérationnel 2014-2017 Unité d'aménagement 094-51 (PDF) (in French), Ministère des Ressources naturelles Québec
- "Lac aux Mouches", CGNDB: Canadian Geographical Names Database
- Lac aux Mouches (in French), Commission de toponymie du Québec
- "Maps showing Lac aux Mouches, Lac-Walker; Sept-Rivières, Quebec", canmaps
- Rivière Schmon (in French), Commission de toponymie du Québec
