= Rivière à la Chasse (Baie-Comeau) =

Location
- Country: Canada
- Province: Quebec
- Region: Côte-Nord
- MRC: Manicouagan Regional County Municipality
- City: Baie-Comeau

Physical characteristics
- Source: Castelnau Lake
  - location: Baie-Comeau
  - coordinates: 49°15′36″N 68°11′48″W
  - elevation: 128 m (420 ft)
- Mouth: Golfe du Saint-Laurent
  - location: Baie-Comeau
  - coordinates: 49°12′02″N 68°11′35″W
  - elevation: 2 m (6.6 ft)
- Length: 9.9 km (6.2 mi)

Basin features
- Tributaries
  - left: (upstream) discharge from a small lake (via Lac à la Chasse), discharge from two lakes (via Lac à la Chasse).
  - right: (upstream) 2 streams, outlet of Lac Singelais, outlet of Long Lake (via Lac à la Chasse), 2 streams (via Lac à la Chasse).

The rivière à la Chasse (French pronunciation: [ʁivjɛʁ a la ʃas], lit. 'Hunting river') is a tributary of the Gulf of St. Lawrence, flowing in the town of Baie-Comeau, in the Manicouagan Regional County Municipality, in the administrative region of Côte-Nord, in the province of Quebec, in Canada.

The western part of the Chasse River valley is served by the Trans-Quebec-Labrador road and forest roads; the lower part, by route 138. In addition to the urban area (Haute-Rive sector) at the end of the segment, forestry is the main economic activity in this valley.

The surface of the Chasse River is usually frozen from the beginning of December to the end of March, except the rapids; however, traffic on the ice is generally safe from mid-December to mid-March.

== Geography ==
The Chasse River draws its source from Lake Castelnau (length: 4.5 km (2.8 mi); altitude: 128 m (420 ft)) in Baie-Comeau. This source is located at:

- 1.0 km (0.62 mi) west of lac à la Chasse;
- 8.5 km (5.3 mi) north-east of Baie-Comeau town center;
- 6.6 km (4.1 mi) north-west of the mouth of the Chasse river.

The Chasse river flows between the Amédée River (located on the west side) and the Rivière aux Anglais (east side). From the dam at the mouth of Lake Castelnau, the Chasse River flows over 9.9 km (6.2 mi) with a drop of 126 m (413 ft), according to the following segments:

- 1.4 km (0.87 mi) north-east, relatively in a straight line, to a bay on the north shore of Lac à la Chasse;
- 3.3 km (2.1 mi) south across Lac à la Chasse (length: 4.0 km (2.5 mi); altitude: 52 m (171 ft)) to the dam located at its mouth;
- 5.2 km (3.2 mi) first south on 3.7 km (2.3 mi) crossing the route 138 to a stream (coming from the south-west); then east on 1.5 km (0.93 mi), to its mouth.

The Chasse River flows into the bottom of a small bay on the north shore of the Gulf of Saint Lawrence, between the Haute-Rive sector (east side) and the Baie-Comeau sector (west side), or at:

- 9.6 km (6.0 mi) north-east of the mouth of the Manicouagan River;
- 4.3 km (2.7 mi) north of Pointe-Lebel where the regional airport is located;
- 5.0 km (3.1 mi) north-east of downtown Baie-Comeau.

== Toponymy ==
The toponym "Rivière à la Chasse" was formalized on December 5, 1968, at the Place Names Bank of the Commission de toponymie du Québec.

=== See also ===
- List of rivers of North Shore
