= Amédée Lake (Baie-Comeau) =

Lake in Baie-Comeau, Quebec, Canada

Coordinates: 49°16′10″N 68°19′10″W

- Location within Quebec
- Location: Baie-Comeau, Quebec, Canada
- Primary outflows: Amédée River
- Basin countries: Canada
- Max. length: 2.6 kilometres (1.6 mi)
- Max. width: 1.1 kilometres (0.68 mi)
- Surface elevation: 81 metres (266 ft)
- Settlements: Baie-Comeau

The lake Amédée is a freshwater body of the watershed of the Amédée River, in the territory of the town of Baie-Comeau, in the Manicouagan Regional County Municipality, on the Côte-Nord, in the province of Quebec, in Canada.

The area around Lake Amédée is served by a few forest roads. The eastern part of the Amédée river valley is indirectly served by the Trans-Quebec-Labrador highway (route 389).

Forestry is the main economic activity around the lake.

The surface of Lake Amédée is usually frozen from the beginning of December to the end of March; traffic on the ice is generally safe from mid-December to mid-March.

== Geography ==
Lac Amédée is located in the northwestern part of the territory of the town of Baie-Comeau. This lake in the western part of thae township of Laflèche is the main body of water on the slope of the river of the same name. Lac Amédée has a length of 2.6 km (1.6 mi), a maximum width of 1.1 km (0.68 mi) and an altitude of 81 m (266 ft).

From the mouth of Lake Amédée, the current descends on 10.1 km (6.3 mi) generally towards the south-east following the course of the Amédée River, in particular by crossing the urban territory of Baie-Comeau, to flow onto the north shore of the Manicouagan estuary.

== Toponym ==
Formerly, the hydromyne "Lac Amédée" was designated "Lac aux Perchaudes" and "Lac à l'Aigle". The acronym "lac Amédée" has appeared since at least 1933 on cartographic documents.

This acronym evokes the memory of foreman Amédée Couillard-Després, first manager of the Manicouagan sawmill. This company was founded in 1898 in Baie-Comeau by the Damase brothers and Henri Jalbert. This company specialized in cutting logs to make lumber (especially planks); these products were intended for export to Europe.

The toponym "lac Amédée" was formalized on December 5, 1968, at the Place Names Bank of the "Commission de toponymie du Québec".

== See also ==
- Gulf of St. Lawrence, a stream
- List of rivers of Quebec
