= Andrea Jourdan =

Canadian chef, ghost writer, and culinary author

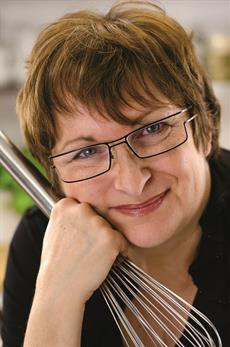
- Andrea Jourdan in 2019
- Born: 1956 (age 68–69); Baie-Comeau, Quebec, Canada
- Occupation(s): Chef, author

Andrea Jourdan (born 1956) is a Canadian chef, ghost writer and a culinary author with over 100 published cookbooks.

== Early life ==
Andrea Jourdan was born in Baie-Comeau, Quebec, Canada. She studied political science and French literature.

== Career ==
After several years in France during which she encountered chefs Joël Robuchon and Bernard Loiseau, Andrea and her husband, American film director Philip Jourdan, opened their first restaurant Chez toi chez moi in Los Angeles. A second restaurant was opened in Montreal. Her love for European cuisine sees her return to Europe, more specifically in Italy, where she hosted the TV series Mangia! Mangia! created for the American market and which aired from 1996 to 1998. She then wrote and self-published her first cookbook in English, The Extra Virgin Olive Oil of Lucca which provides several recipes with the product and details numerous olive oil producers of Lucca in Tuscany.

In 2001, Andrea Jourdan opened a gourmet grocery store in Montreal called Les Petits Plaisirs d'Andrea and closed it due to unfortunate circumstances. Along with TV host and actress Francine Ruel, she participated for 2 seasons (2002-2004) on the summer TV series "L'été c'est péché" (summer is a sin), where several local celebrities collaborated daily discussing aspects of each deadly sin. For author Chrystine Brouillet, chef Ian Perreault and Andrea Jourdan, the theme was gluttony.

In 2011, Andrea Jourdan published her first cookbook in French, Spoom, Desserts envoûtants which won in 2012 the prestigious Gourmand World Cookbook Awards for Best Photography of cookbooks published in French Canada. Followed two best-selling titles on tartares, carpaccios and pies: Tartares et Carpaccios and Tartes en folie.

Since 2013, her Complètement cookbook series has been published by Éditions de l'Homme and titles are e-published in English under the name Absolutely. The concept of each title is to propose 30 original recipes around a single subject. Two of her cookbooks have won the coveted Gourmand World Cookbook Awards in 2015: Recevoir toute l'année avec Andrea (Best Entertaining cookbook - French Canada) and Le garde-manger d'Andrea (Best Easy Recipes cookbook - French Canada). Andrea Jourdan is also a weekly columnist to the "Food" section (Saveurs) in the newspaper Journal de Montréal After closing the first gourmet shop Les Petits Plaisirs d'Andrea on Laurier Street, Andrea opened on March 9, 2016, a new gourmet location, Andrea Jourdan La Boutique in Jean-Talon Market, where she shares a variety of original food products imported from all over the world as well as her own unique culinary creations, amongst which her infamous FBV (fraise-basilic-vodka or strawberry basil vodka jam).

== Publications ==
As of 2018, Jourdan has written over 100 cookbooks. She has ghostwritten many cookbooks for several Canadian chefs. See list of publications below.

- The Extra Virgin Olive Oil of Lucca, Andrea's Kitchen Books, 1998. ISBN 978-0-96710-000-5
- Spoom, Desserts envoûtants, Éditions Transcontinental, 2011. ISBN 978-2-89472-589-4
- Tartares & Carpaccios, Éditions Transcontinental, 2012. ISBN 978-2-89472-617-4
- Tartes en folie, Éditions Transcontinental, 2012. ISBN 978-2-89472-619-8
- Burgers & Pizzas, Marshall Cavendish, 2012. ISBN 978-9-81436-146-0
- Cupcakes & Muffins, Marshall Cavendish, 2012. ISBN 978-9-81436-149-1
- Pies & Quiches, Marshall Cavendish, 2012. ISBN 978-9-81436-147-7
- Soups & Sandwiches, Marshall Cavendish, 2012. ISBN 978-9-81436-148-4
- Sweets & Desserts, Marshall Cavendish, 2012. ISBN 978-9-81436-150-7
- Complètement Cheesecakes, Les Éditions de l'Homme, 2012. ISBN 978-2-76193-463-3
- Complètement Crevettes, Les Éditions de l'Homme, 2012. ISBN 978-2-76193-465-7
- Complètement Cru, Les Éditions de l'Homme, 2012. ISBN 978-2-76193-460-2
- Complètement Desserts en pots, Les Éditions de l'Homme, 2012. ISBN 978-2-76193-732-0
- Complètement Limonades, Les Éditions de l'Homme, 2012. ISBN 978-2-76193-461-9
- Complètement Quinoa, Les Éditions de l'Homme, 2012. ISBN 978-2-76193-459-6
- Complètement Salades, Les Éditions de l'Homme, 2012. ISBN 978-2-76193-457-2
- Complètement Smoothies, Les Éditions de l'Homme, 2012. ISBN 978-2-76193-462-6
- Complètement Soupes d'automne, Les Éditions de l'Homme, 2012. ISBN 978-2-76193-668-2
- Complètement Soupes froides, Les Éditions de l'Homme, 2012. ISBN 978-2-76193-456-5
- Complètement Tartares, Les Éditions de l'Homme, 2012. ISBN 978-2-76193-458-9
- Complètement Tomates, Les Éditions de l'Homme, 2012. ISBN 978-2-76193-465-7
- Absolutely Autumn Soups, AF Gourmet, 2012
- Absolutely Cheesecake, AF Gourmet, 2012
- Absolutely Chicken, AF Gourmet, 2012
- Absolutely Cold Soups, AF Gourmet, 2012
- Absolutely Cookies, AF Gourmet, 2012
- Absolutely Crepes, AF Gourmet, 2012
- Absolutely Desserts in a Jar, AF Gourmet, 2012
- Absolutely Ice Cream, AF Gourmet, 2012
- Absolutely Lasagna, AF Gourmet, 2012
- Absolutely Lemonade, AF Gourmet, 2012
- Absolutely Quinoa, AF Gourmet, 2012
- Absolutely Raw, AF Gourmet, 2012
- Absolutely Risottos, AF Gourmet, 2012
- Absolutely Salads, AF Gourmet, 2012
- Absolutely Salmon, AF Gourmet, 2012
- Absolutely Shrimp, AF Gourmet, 2012
- Absolutely Smoothies, AF Gourmet, 2012
- Absolutely Tajine, AF Gourmet, 2012
- Absolutely Tartare, AF Gourmet, 2012
- Absolutely Tomatoes, AF Gourmet, 2012
- Chicken Meals, Marshall Cavendish, 2013. ISBN 978-9-81440-846-2
- Ice Creams & Sorbets, Marshall Cavendish, 2013. ISBN 978-9-81440-844-8
- Lasagne & Risottos, Marshall Cavendish, 2013. ISBN 978-9-81440-845-5
- Pancakes & Waffles, Marshall Cavendish, 2013. ISBN 978-9-81440-843-1
- Ultimate Cookies, Marshall Cavendish, 2013. ISBN 978-9-81440-847-9
- 150 Best Desserts in a Jar, Robert Rose, 2013. ISBN 978-0-77880-435-2
- Desserts en pots. 150 recettes irrésistibles, Les Éditions de l'Homme, 2013. ISBN 978-2-76193-497-8
- Complètement Courges, Les Éditions de l'Homme, 2013. ISBN 978-2-76193-863-1
- Complètement Gâteaux au chocolat, Les Éditions de l'Homme, 2013. ISBN 978-2-76193-866-2
- Complètement Gratins, Les Éditions de l'Homme, 2013. ISBN 978-2-76193-867-9
- Complètement Noël, Les Éditions de l'Homme, 2013. ISBN 978-2-76193-864-8
- Complètement Osso buco, Les Éditions de l'Homme, 2013. ISBN 978-2-76193-865-5
- Complètement Burgers, Les Éditions de l'Homme, 2014. ISBN 978-2-76193-979-9
- Complètement Érable, Les Éditions de l'Homme, 2014. ISBN 978-2-76193-980-5
- Complètement Fraises, Les Éditions de l'Homme, 2014. ISBN 978-2-76193-978-2
- Complètement Pétoncles, Les Éditions de l'Homme, 2014. ISBN 978-2-76193-977-5
- Les desserts faciles d'Andrea, Éditions Coup d'œil, 2014. ISBN 978-2-89731-481-1
- Complètement Biscuits, Les Éditions de l'Homme, 2014. ISBN 978-2-76193-672-9
- Complètement Lasagnes, Les Éditions de l'Homme, 2014. ISBN 978-2-76193-671-2
- Complètement Poulet, Les Éditions de l'Homme, 2014. ISBN 978-2-76193-669-9
- Complètement Risottos, Les Éditions de l'Homme, 2014. ISBN 978-2-76193-670-5
- La mijoteuse facile d'Andrea, Éditions Coup d'œil, 2014. ISBN 978-2-89731-480-4
- Le garde-manger d'Andrea, Éditions Goélette, 2014. ISBN 978-2-89690-627-7
- Recevoir toute l'année avec Andrea, Éditions Coup d'œil, 2014. ISBN 978-2-89731-484-2
- Grillades chez soi, Éditions Coup d'œil, 2014. ISBN 978-2-89731-482-8
- Homard et crabe chez soi, Éditions Coup d'œil, 2014. ISBN 978-2-89731-483-5
  - Complètement Crème glacée, Les Éditions de l'Homme, 2014. ISBN 978-2-76193-854-9
- Complètement Noix de coco, Les Éditions de l'Homme, 2014. ISBN 978-2-76194-263-8
- Complètement Pommes, Les Éditions de l'Homme, 2014. ISBN 978-2-76194-264-5
- Complètement Saumon, Les Éditions de l'Homme, 2014. ISBN 978-2-76193-856-3
- Le poêlon à toutes les sauces, Éditions Coup d'œil, 2015. ISBN 978-2-89731-479-8
- La saison des conserves avec Claudette Dion, Éditions Édito, 2015. ISBN 978-2-92440-252-8
- Sortez vos mijoteuses avec Claudette Dion, Éditions Édito, 2015. ISBN 978-2-92440-253-5
- Complètement Asperges, Les Éditions de l'Homme, 2015. ISBN 978-2-76194-218-8
- Complètement Brochettes, Les Éditions de l'Homme, 2015. ISBN 978-2-76194-219-5
- Complètement Crêpes, Les Éditions de l'Homme, 2015. ISBN 978-2-76193-673-6
- Complètement Tajines, Les Éditions de l'Homme, 2015. ISBN 978-2-76193-857-0
- Les super aliments à toutes les sauces, Éditions Coup d'œil, 2016. ISBN 978-2-89731-386-9
- Irrésistible érable, une histoire d'amour en 100 recettes, Éditions Édito, 2016. ISBN 978-2-92440-272-6
- Chasse et pêche : 100 recettes de gibier et de poissons du Québec, Éditions Coup d'œil, 2016. ISBN 978-2-89731-754-6
- Simplement BBQ : 110 recettes du Journal de Montréal, Éditions du Journal de Montréal, 2018. ISBN 978-2-89761-071-5
- Caviar (par Andrea), Andrea Jourdan Éditions, September 2018. ISBN 978-2-92493-806-5
- Caviar (by Andrea), Andrea Jourdan Éditions, September 2018. ISBN 978-2-92493-801-0
- Érable (par Andrea), Andrea Jourdan Éditions, September 2018. ISBN 978-2-92493-804-1
- Maple (by Andrea), Andrea Jourdan Éditions, September 2018. ISBN 978-2-92493-805-8
- Foie gras (par Andrea), Andrea Jourdan Éditions, September 2018. ISBN 978-2-92493-802-7
- Foie Gras (by Andrea), Andrea Jourdan Éditions, September 2018. ISBN 978-2-92493-803-4
- Truffe (par Andrea), Andrea Jourdan Éditions, September 2018. ISBN 978-2-92493-806-5
- Truffle (by Andrea), Andrea Jourdan Éditions, September 2018. ISBN 978-2-92493-807-2
- Coffret 4 livres gourmands (tome 1), Andrea Jourdan Éditions, September 2018. ISBN 978-2-92493-813-3. Contains cookbooks in French: Caviar, Érable, Foie Gras and Truffe, part of the series Par Andrea.
- 4-Volume Cookbook Set (Vol 1), Andrea Jourdan Éditions, September 2018. ISBN 978-2-92493-814-0. Contains cookbooks in English: Caviar, Foie Gras, Maple & Truffle part of the series By Andrea.
- Cuisiner au vin blanc, Andrea Jourdan Éditions, September 2018. ISBN 978-2-92493-809-6
- Cuisiner au vin rouge, Andrea Jourdan Éditions, September 2018. ISBN 978-2-92493-808-9
- Cooking with Red Wine, Andrea Jourdan Éditions, September 2018. ISBN 978-2-92493-811-9
- Cooking with White Wine, Andrea Jourdan Éditions, September 2018. ISBN 978-2-92493-812-6

== Translations ==
- The Great Book of Fish, Book Sales, 1998. ISBN 978-1-57145-248-1.
- The Great Book of Mediterranean Cuisine, Book Sales, 1998. ISBN 978-0-78581-368-2.
- The Great Book of Pasta, Book Sales, 1998. ISBN 978-1-57145-247-4.

== Collaborations ==
- 100 Personnalités 100 Recettes, Fondation les Ailes de la Mode, 2002. ISBN 978-2-98077-060-9.
- Introduction of cookbook BBQ au Max (author: Max Lavoie), Guy Saint-Jean Éditeur, 2015. ISBN 978-2-89455-939-0.
- Recettes du Québec (various authors), Éditions Transcontinental, 2012. ISBN 978-2-89472-491-0, 978-2-89472-492-7. In this cookbook, Andrea Jourdan is credited as Food Stylist.
