= Cégep de Baie-Comeau =

Public college in Baie-Comeau, Quebec

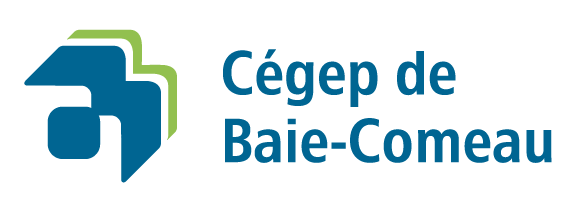
- Motto: Mon milieu de vie! (French)
- Motto in English: Where I live!
- Type: Public CEGEP
- Established: 1967
- Academic affiliations: ACCC
- Location: Baie-Comeau, Quebec, Canada; 49°11′15″N 68°15′33″W
- Campus: Urban
- Colours: Blue and green
- Sporting affiliations: CCAA, QSSF, AUCC
- Website: www.cegep-baie-comeau.qc.ca

Cégep de Baie-Comeau (French pronunciation: [seʒɛp də bɛ kɔmo]) is a CEGEP in Baie-Comeau, Quebec, Canada. Cégep de Baie-Comeau, a pre-university and technical college, is affiliated with ACCC, and CCAA.

== History ==
The college traces its origins to the merger of several institutions which became public ones in 1967, when the Québec system of CÉGEPs was created.

== Programs ==
The Province of Quebec awards a Diploma of Collegial Studies for two types of programs: two years of pre-university studies or three years of vocational (technical) studies. The pre-university programs, which take two years to complete, cover the subject matters which roughly correspond to the additional year of high school given elsewhere in Canada in preparation for a chosen field in university. The technical programs, which take three-years to complete, applies to students who wish to pursue a skill trade. In addition Continuing education and services to business are provided.

== See also ==
- Higher education in Quebec
