= Amédée River =

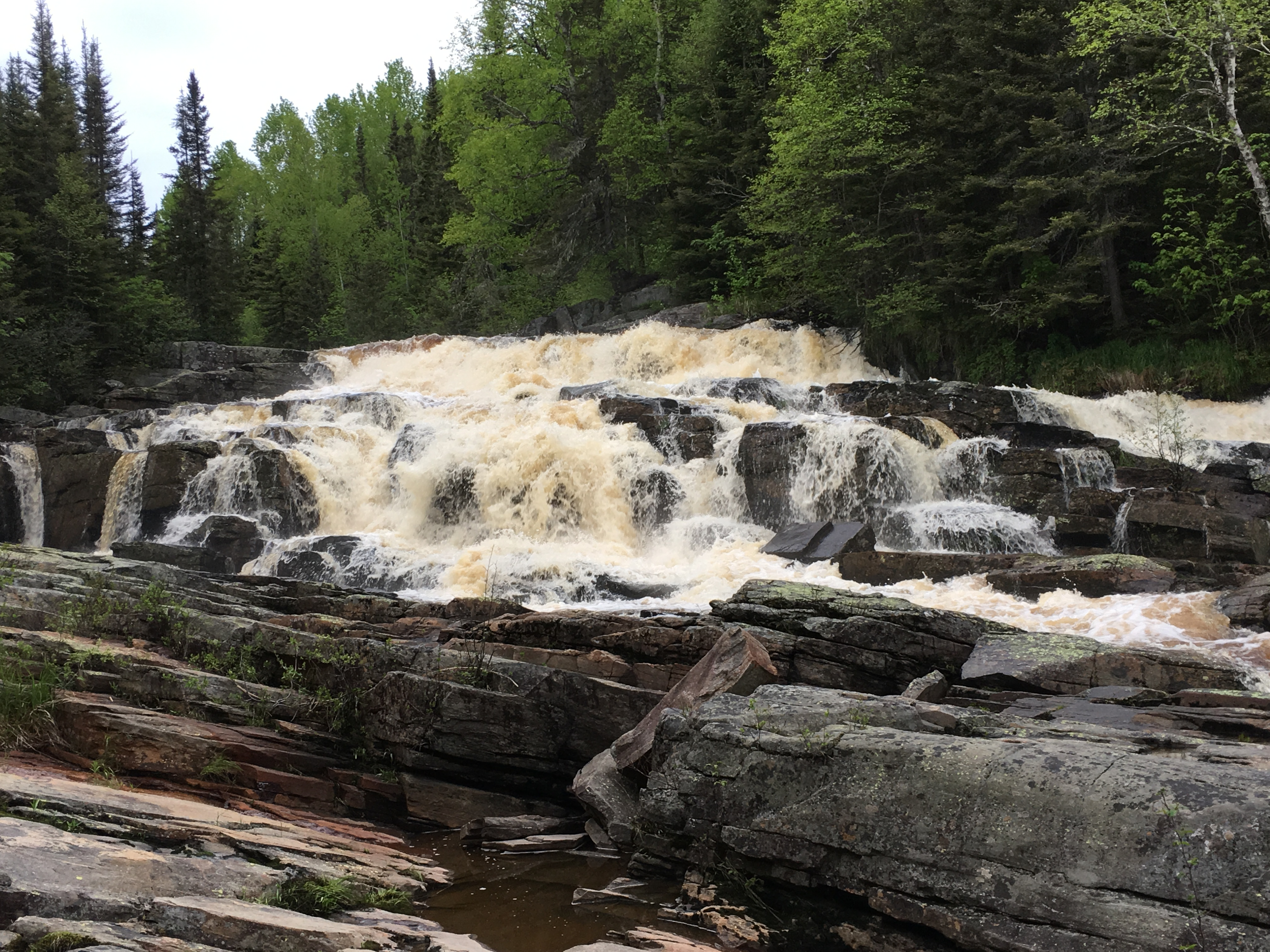
- Chute de la rivière Amédée

Location
- Country: Canada
- Province: Quebec
- Region: Côte-Nord
- MRC: Manicouagan Regional County Municipality
- City: Baie-Comeau

Physical characteristics
- Source: Brassard Lake
  - location: Baie-Comeau
  - coordinates: 49°15′02″N 68°18′31″W
  - elevation: 81 m (266 ft)
- Mouth: Gulf of Saint Lawrence
  - location: Baie-Comeau
  - coordinates: 49°11′11″N 68°14′21″W
  - elevation: 2 m (6.6 ft)
- Length: 10.1 km (6.3 mi)

Basin features
- Tributaries
  - left: (upstream)
  - right: (upstream) Le Petit Bras, Couillard stream, unidentified stream, stream (via Lac Amédée), outlet (via Lac Amédée) from Lac Marcel, outlet (via Lac Amédée) from Lac du Hibou, outlet of three small lakes.

The Amédée River (French: rivière Amédée, pronounced [ʁivjɛʁ amede]) is a tributary of the St. Lawrence River, crossing the town of Baie-Comeau, in the Manicouagan Regional County Municipality on the Côte-Nord, in the province of Quebec, in Canada.

The eastern part of the Amédée river valley is served by forest roads and indirectly by the Trans-Québec-Labrador road; the lower part, by the route 138.

Besides the urban area (Baie-Comeau sector) at the end of the segment, forestry is the main economic activity in this valley.

The surface of the Amédée River is usually frozen from the beginning of December to the end of March, except the rapids areas; however, safe circulation on the ice is generally from mid-December to mid-March.

== Toponymy ==
The Amédée river is named in honor of Amédée Couillard-Després, first manager of the sawmill built at the mouth of the river by Damase and Henri Jalbert in 1898.^{,}

The toponym “Amédée river” was formalized on December 5, 1968, at the Place Names Bank of the Commission de toponymie du Québec.

== Geography ==
The Amédée River is part of the Manicouagan River watershed. It is supplied by Lake Amédée (length: 2.6 km (1.6 mi); altitude: 81 m (266 ft)) located at 7.9 km (4.9 mi) northwest of downtown town of Baie-Comeau. Lake Amédée is supplied by:

- north-west bank: two streams,
- north shore: the outlet of 5 lakes, the outlet of Lake Hibou, the outlet of Lake Marcel;
- east bank: the outlet of a stream, the outlet of two lakes, the outlet of two lakes.

The Amédée river has a free weir-type dam to regulate the water flow. The river ends with falls located near the site named Vieux Poste before emptying into the St. Lawrence River.

The Amédée river flows for 10.1 km (6.3 mi) with a drop of 79 m (259 ft), according to the following segments:

- 5.9 km (3.7 mi) generally towards the south-east, forming some coils, until the beginning of a widening of the river;
- 2.7 km (1.7 mi) towards the south-east forming a widening of the river, first on 1.4 km (0.87 mi) by collecting the Couillard stream (coming from the north) to route 138; then on 1.3 km (0.81 mi) towards the south-east passing in an industrial zone (located on the west side of the river) and collecting Le Petit Bras (coming northeast) to the dam;
- 1.5 km (0.93 mi) towards the south-east crossing two zones of rapids and forming a loop towards the east at the end of the segment, until its mouth.

The Amédée river flows at the bottom of a small bay on the north shore of the Gulf of St. Lawrence, either:

- 6.2 km (3.9 mi) north-east of the mouth of the Manicouagan River;
- 3.8 km (2.4 mi) north-west of Pointe-Lebel where the regional airport is located;
- 3.7 km (2.3 mi) south-west of the mouth of the rivière à la Chasse (Baie-Comeau).

== See also ==
- List of rivers of Quebec
