= Lake Schmon =

Lake in Quebec, Canada

- Lac Schmon (French)
- Location within Quebec Location within Canada
- Coordinates: 50°57′29″N 67°19′34″W
- Basin countries: Canada
- Surface elevation: 474 metres (1,555 ft)

Lake Schmon (French: Lac Schmon) is a lake in Quebec, Canada.

== Location ==
Lake Schmon is in the unorganized territory of Lac-Walker, Sept-Rivières Regional County Municipality, Quebec. As of November 2021 the Commission de toponymie of Quebec had not determined the origin or meaning of the name. The Schmon River, which flows through the lake, is named after Arthur A. Schmon (1895-1964), president and general manager of the Quebec North Shore Paper Company. Lake Arthur is also named after Schmon.

== Hydrology ==
The lake is southeast of the Lac aux Chiens. It has two roughly equal sections joined by a channel. The Schmon River enters the northern section from the northwest, and leaves the southern section from the southeast.

== Sources ==
- "Lac Schmon", CGNDB: Canadian Geographical Names Database, Government of Canada
- Lac Schmon, Commission de toponymie
- Réserve faunique de Port-Cartier-Sept-Îles Carte générale (PDF) (in French), Sépaq
- Rivière Schmon (in French), Commission de toponymie
