= Castelnau Lake =

Lake in Côte-Nord, Quebec, Canada

Coordinates: 49°16′20″N 68°12′53″W

- Location within Quebec
- Location: Baie-Comeau, Manicouagan Regional County Municipality, Côte-Nord, Quebec, Canada
- Primary inflows: (clockwise from the mouth) Discharge from an unidentified lake, discharge from an unidentified lake, 5 unidentified streams, discharge from Cimon lake.
- Primary outflows: Rivière à la Chasse
- Basin countries: Canada
- Max. length: 4.5 kilometres (2.8 mi)
- Max. width: 2.4 kilometres (1.5 mi)
- Surface elevation: 128 metres (420 ft)
- Islands: 5
- Settlements: Baie-Comeau

The lac Castelnau is a freshwater body of the watershed of the rivière à la Chasse, in the territory of the town of Baie-Comeau, in the Manicouagan Regional County Municipality on the administrative region of Côte-Nord, in the province of Quebec, to Canada.

The area around Castelnau Lake is served by a few forest roads. The western part of the Castelnau lake slope is indirectly served by the Trans-Quebec-Labrador road (route 389); the eastern part is served indirectly by Comeau Boulevard route 138.

Forestry is the main economic activity around the lake.

The surface of Lake Castelnau is usually frozen from the beginning of December to the end of March; however, traffic on the ice is generally safe from mid-December to mid-March.

== Geography ==
Lake Castelnau is located in the northern part of the territory of the town of Baie-Comeau. This lake is the main body of water on the slope of the Chasse river. Lake Castelnau has a length of 4.5 km (2.8 mi), a maximum width of 2.4 km (1.5 mi) and an altitude of 128 m (420 ft).

From the mouth of Lake Castelnau, the current descends on 9.9 km (6.2 mi) generally north-east, then south, following the course of the rivière à la Chasse, in particular by crossing an urban sector in the eastern part of Baie-Comeau at the end of the segment, to flow onto the north shore of the Manicouagan estuary.

== Toponym ==
The acronym "lac Castelnau" evokes the memory of Louise Grigon, baroness of Castelnau. This lady worked as an associate in the exploitation of the islands and islets of Mingan. The other partners in this major project were in 1781 the heirs of Louis Jolliet and Jacques de Lalande de Gayon.

The toponym "lac Castelnau" was formalized on December 5, 1968, at the Place Names Bank of the Commission de toponymie du Québec.

== Appendices ==
=== Related articles ===
- Manicouagan Regional County Municipality
- Baie-Comeau, a city
- Rivière à la Chasse, a stream
- Gulf of St. Lawrence, a stream
- List of rivers of Quebec
