= Baie-Comeau =

- City
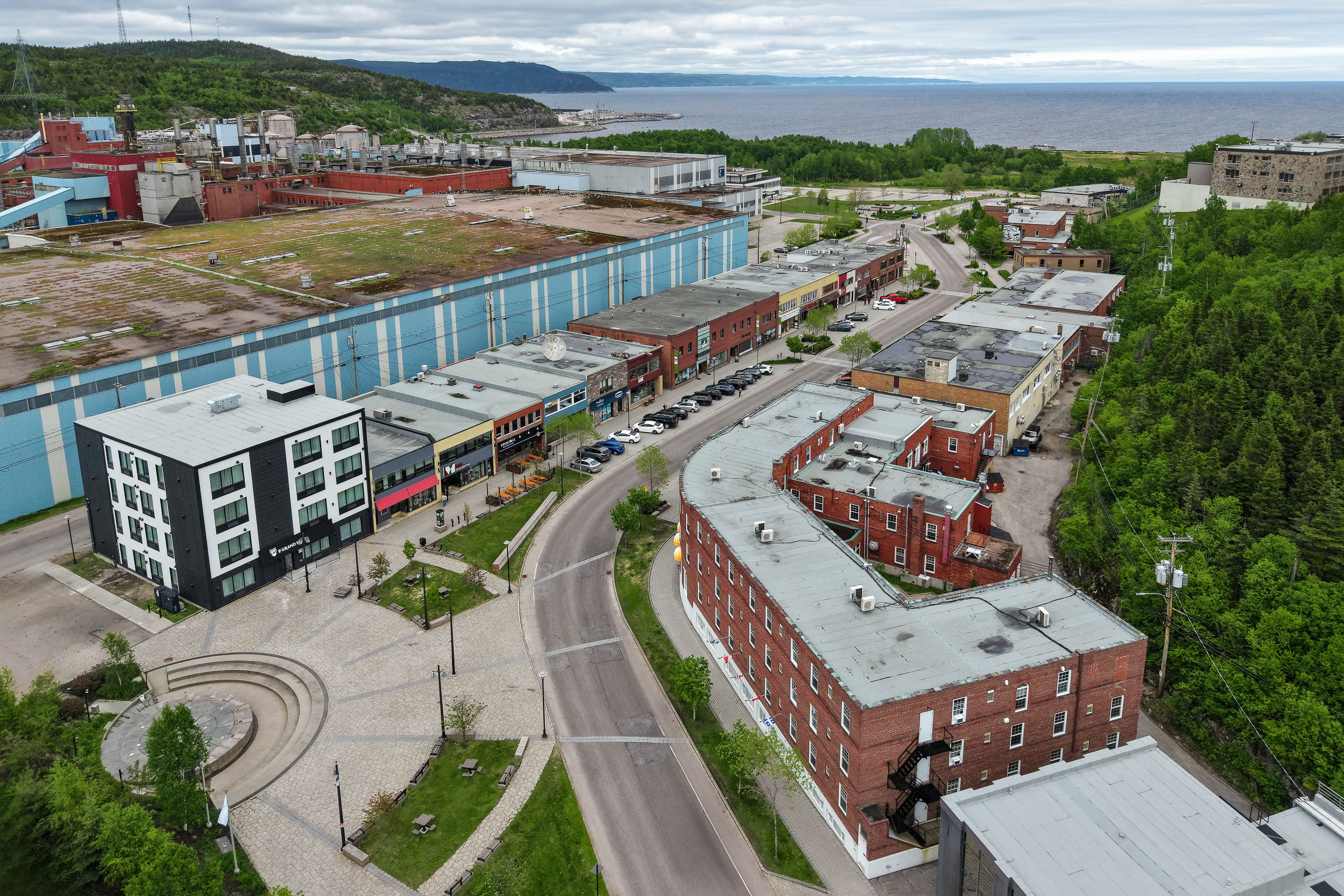
- Downtown Baie-Comeau

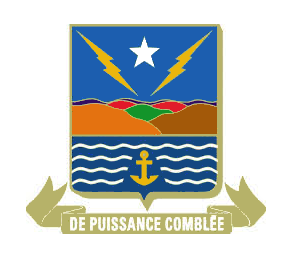
- Coat of arms

- Map of RCM with Baie-Comeau highlighted

- Location in Côte-Nord region of Quebec
- Coordinates: 49°13′N 68°09′W
- Country: Canada
- Province: Quebec
- Region: Côte-Nord
- RCM: Manicouagan
- Founded: 1936
- Constituted: June 23, 1982

Government
  - Mayor: Michel Desbiens
  - Federal riding: Côte-Nord—Kawawachikamach—Nitassinan
  - Prov. riding: René-Lévesque

Area
  - Total: 434.54 km^{2} (167.78 sq mi)
  - Land: 334.83 km^{2} (129.28 sq mi)
  - Urban: 19.95 km^{2} (7.70 sq mi)
  - Metro: 682.89 km^{2} (263.67 sq mi)
- Elevation: 21.60 m (70.9 ft)

Population (2021)
  - Total: 20,687
  - Density: 61.8/km^{2} (160/sq mi)
  - Urban: 20,247
  - Urban density: 1,014.9/km^{2} (2,629/sq mi)
  - Metro: 26,643
  - Metro density: 39/km^{2} (100/sq mi)
  - Change (2016-21): ▼3.9%
  - Dwellings: 10,163
- Time zone: UTC−05:00 (EST)
  - Summer (DST): UTC−04:00 (EDT)
- Postal code(s): G4Z, G5C
- Area codes: 418 and 581
- Highways: R-138 R-389
- Website: www.ville.baie-comeau.qc.ca

Baie-Comeau (French pronunciation: [bɛ kɔmo]) is a city in the Côte-Nord region of the province of Quebec, Canada. It is located on the shores of the St. Lawrence River, and is the seat of Manicouagan Regional County Municipality. It is near the mouth of the Manicouagan River, named after the adjacent Comeau Bay. It has a population of 20,687 in the 2021 Canadian census, and the census agglomeration population is 26,643.

Baie-Comeau is the birthplace of Brian Mulroney, former prime minister of Canada.

Although the city is officially named in honour of Napoléon-Alexandre Comeau, the origin of the name actually comes from his father Antoine-Alexandre Comeau, who was an employee of the Hudson's Bay Company and had a camp there. Travellers would spontaneously think of “the bay of the Comeau camp”, perpetuated by word of mouth until the employees of the Geography Commission wrote Anse à Comeau (Comeau Cove) on plans. When Baie-Comeau was founded however, the authorities were unaware of the origin of this name, and specified that it honoured Napoléon-Alexandre Comeau (1848-1923).

== History ==
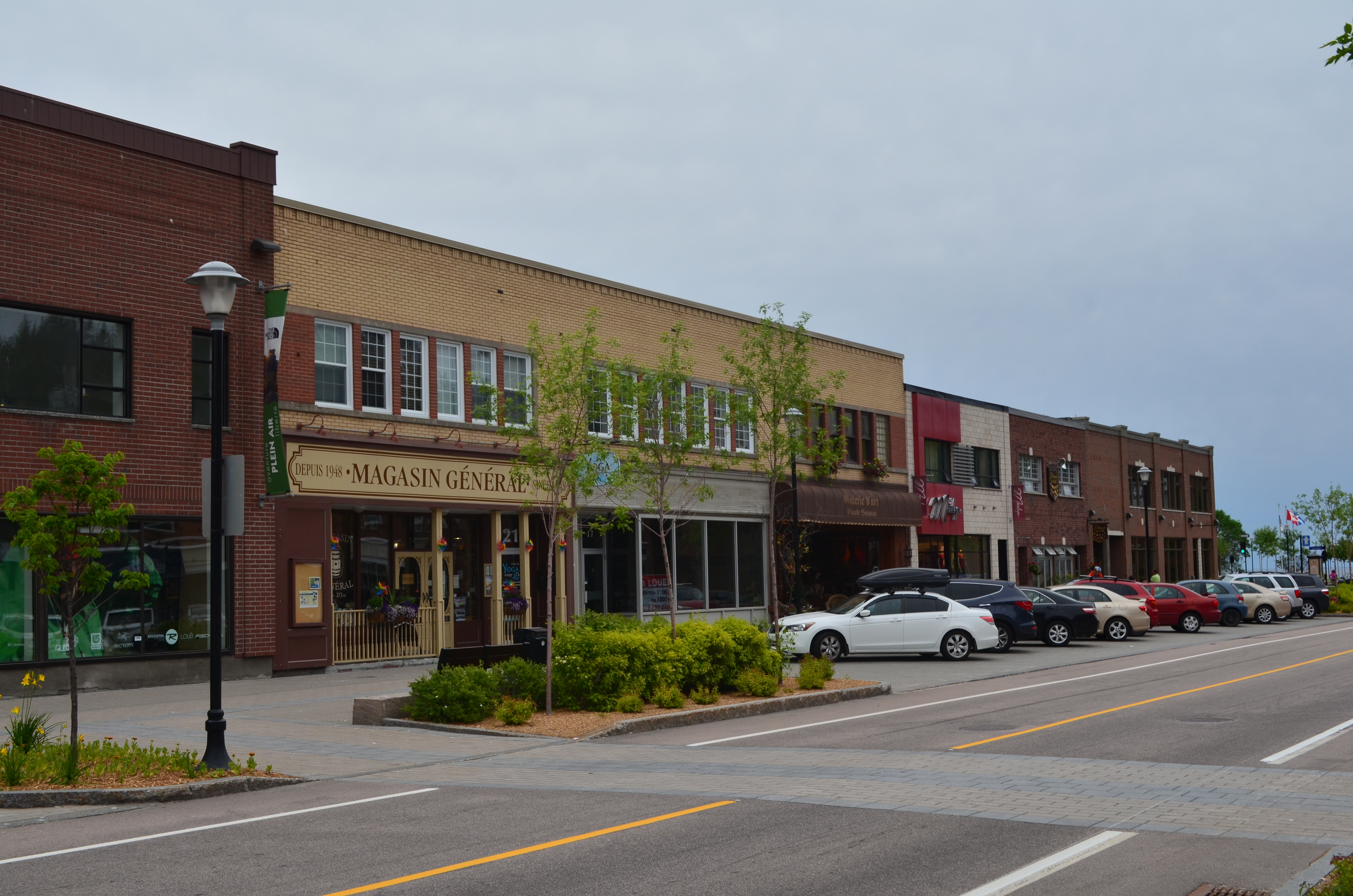
Place la Salle, the city's main street

The oldest part of Baie-Comeau is the area known as Vieux-Poste (Old Post) near the mouth of the Amédée River where in 1889, the Saint-Eugène-de-Manicouagan Mission was founded by Eudists. In 1898, the first sawmill in the Côte-Nord region was built there by the brothers Damase and Henri Jalbert, but it closed in 1907 after their timber stock was swept into the St. Lawrence. In 1916, Route 138 was extended to Saint-Eugène-de-Manicouagan and in 1929, its post office opened with the English name of Comeau Bay (francized in 1936).

Baie-Comeau itself (the eastern part of the current town) was founded in 1936 when a paper mill was constructed by Colonel Robert R. McCormick, publisher of the Chicago Tribune. Arthur A. Schmon oversaw the project, which included a power station and housing. Experiencing remarkable growth, the Town of Baie-Comeau was incorporated on May 20, 1937. Coinciding with the completion of the mill, the Hudson's Bay Company opened a store on September 15 of that same year. It was the first HBC small department store in Quebec. The area continued to see economic development with the establishment of the hydro-electric power stations on the Manicouagan and Outardes Rivers beginning with the Chutes-aux-Outardes Station in 1952, an aluminum smelter in 1958, and grain warehouses (the largest in Canada) in 1959.

In 1950, the village of Saint-Eugène-de-Manicouagan was incorporated as the Municipality of Hauterive. In June 1982, Hauterive was merged into Baie-Comeau, taking effect on January 1, 1983. The HBC closed its Baie-Comeau store in 1986.

Baie-Comeau is the seat of the judicial district of Baie-Comeau.

== Geography ==
Baie-Comeau is located on the north shore of the St. Lawrence River, about 400 kilometres (250 mi) northeast of Quebec City and 230 kilometres (140 mi) southwest of Sept-Îles.

There are two urban area population centres within the city limits: Baie-Comeau proper, with a population of 9,100, and Hauterive, with a population of 11,147, in an area of 8.67 km^{2} (3.35 sq mi) and a density of 1,285.5/km^{2} (3,329/sq mi), as of the 2021 Canadian census.

Baie-Comeau is crossed by five rivers: the Manicouagan River, the Amédée River, the Petit-Bras River, the Chasse River, and the English River. These rivers are fed by around thirty lakes.

=== Climate ===
Although at the same latitude as Vancouver or Paris, Baie-Comeau has a borderline humid continental climate (Köppen Dfb), just above the subarctic climate. The cold Labrador Current makes the Gulf of St. Lawrence very cold and tends to cool the weather during summer much more than the marginal warming of the winters resulting from its maritime location. With the moist northeasterly winds coming in from the Icelandic Low, snowfall is very heavy, averaging around 342.9 cm (135.00 in) per year with a greatest average depth of around 56 cm (22 in) in March. The extreme snow depth was 226 cm (89 in) on January 10, 1969.

Climate data for Baie-Comeau (Baie-Comeau Airport) Climate ID: 7040440; coordinates 49°08′N 68°12′W; elevation: 21.6 m (71 ft); WMO ID: 71890; 1991–2020 normals, extremes 1947–present
Month	Jan	Feb	Mar	Apr	May	Jun	Jul	Aug	Sep	Oct	Nov	Dec	Year
Record high humidex	8.8	8.4	15.3	21.7	30.4	39.1	39.2	46.3	33.2	31.8	20.2	11.6	46.3
Record high °C (°F)	11.4 (52.5)	8.2 (46.8)	11.4 (52.5)	21.8 (71.2)	30.0 (86.0)	31.8 (89.2)	32.8 (91.0)	31.1 (88.0)	28.6 (83.5)	22.6 (72.7)	18.1 (64.6)	11.1 (52.0)	32.8 (91.0)
Mean daily maximum °C (°F)	−8.0 (17.6)	−6.7 (19.9)	−1.6 (29.1)	4.6 (40.3)	12.3 (54.1)	18.3 (64.9)	21.3 (70.3)	20.7 (69.3)	15.8 (60.4)	9.0 (48.2)	2.5 (36.5)	−4.0 (24.8)	7.0 (44.6)
Daily mean °C (°F)	−13.4 (7.9)	−12.4 (9.7)	−6.7 (19.9)	0.6 (33.1)	7.2 (45.0)	12.8 (55.0)	16.0 (60.8)	15.3 (59.5)	10.6 (51.1)	4.8 (40.6)	−1.2 (29.8)	−8.6 (16.5)	2.1 (35.8)
Mean daily minimum °C (°F)	−18.8 (−1.8)	−18.1 (−0.6)	−11.7 (10.9)	−3.4 (25.9)	2.0 (35.6)	7.3 (45.1)	10.7 (51.3)	9.9 (49.8)	5.4 (41.7)	0.6 (33.1)	−4.9 (23.2)	−13.0 (8.6)	−2.8 (27.0)
Record low °C (°F)	−47.2 (−53.0)	−44.4 (−47.9)	−35.6 (−32.1)	−21.0 (−5.8)	−8.3 (17.1)	−3.2 (26.2)	0.6 (33.1)	−0.7 (30.7)	−6.1 (21.0)	−11.0 (12.2)	−22.8 (−9.0)	−37.8 (−36.0)	−47.2 (−53.0)
Record low wind chill	−53.0	−56.9	−48.3	−29.5	−19.0	−4.8	0.0	−2.7	−8.4	−15.1	−31.1	−51.5	−56.9
Average precipitation mm (inches)	64.9 (2.56)	60.5 (2.38)	64.2 (2.53)	71.8 (2.83)	76.2 (3.00)	82.7 (3.26)	110.8 (4.36)	81.9 (3.22)	92.6 (3.65)	96.3 (3.79)	86.6 (3.41)	77.7 (3.06)	966.1 (38.04)
Average rainfall mm (inches)	12.3 (0.48)	14.4 (0.57)	23.7 (0.93)	50.7 (2.00)	88.3 (3.48)	88.7 (3.49)	93.1 (3.67)	75.4 (2.97)	86.3 (3.40)	90.0 (3.54)	57.7 (2.27)	17.0 (0.67)	697.6 (27.46)
Average snowfall cm (inches)	83.8 (33.0)	59.1 (23.3)	48.2 (19.0)	30.3 (11.9)	2.7 (1.1)	0.0 (0.0)	0.0 (0.0)	0.0 (0.0)	0.01 (0.00)	5.4 (2.1)	40.2 (15.8)	73.2 (28.8)	342.9 (135.0)
Average precipitation days (≥ 0.2 mm)	16.4	13.6	14.4	12.7	14.2	13.5	15.7	13.1	13.4	14.6	14.6	16.1	172.2
Average rainy days (≥ 0.2 mm)	1.6	1.8	3.7	8.3	14.1	13.5	14.6	13.5	13.5	14.8	8.7	2.6	110.9
Average snowy days (≥ 0.2 cm)	16.8	11.8	10.7	6.2	0.89	0.0	0.0	0.0	0.05	1.7	8.6	14.3	71.1
Average relative humidity (%) (at 1500 LST)	64.9	63.5	64.4	66.4	62.4	63.6	68.1	67.2	68.9	70.9	72.6	71.0	67.0
Mean monthly sunshine hours	112.5	134.4	163.5	181.7	217.3	237.1	244.0	238.4	163.8	123.4	90.7	94.7	2,001.5
Percentage possible sunshine	41.6	47.0	44.4	44.2	45.8	49.0	49.9	53.5	43.2	36.8	32.9	36.8	43.8
Source: Environment and Climate Change Canada (rain/rain days, snow/snow days and sun 1981–2010)

== Demographics ==
In the 2021 Census of Population conducted by Statistics Canada, Baie-Comeau had a population of 20,687 living in 9,554 of its 10,163 total private dwellings, a change of −3.9% from its 2016 population of 21,536. With a land area of 334.83 km^{2} (129.28 sq mi), it had a population density of 61.8/km^{2} (160.0/sq mi) in 2021.

Canada census – Baie-Comeau community profile

	2021	2016	2011
Population	20,687 (-3.9% from 2016)	21,536 (-2.6% from 2011)	22,113 (-2.0% from 2006)
Land area	334.83 km^{2} (129.28 sq mi)	336.59 km^{2} (129.96 sq mi)	338.99 km^{2} (130.88 sq mi)
Population density	61.8/km^{2} (160/sq mi)	64.0/km^{2} (166/sq mi)	65.2/km^{2} (169/sq mi)
Median age	48.4 (M: 48.0, F: 49.2)	46.5 (M: 46.0, F: 46.9)	45.2 (M: 44.9, F: 45.6)
Private dwellings	10,163 (total) 9,554 (occupied)	10,190 (total)	10,222 (total)
Median household income	$75,500	$68,393	$62,180

Notes: Population in 1996: 25,554 (-1.8% from 1991) - Population in 1991: 26,012
References: 2021 2016 2011

Historical census populations – Baie-Comeau

Year	Pop.	±%
1941	1,548	—
1951	3,972	+156.6%
1956	4,332	+9.1%
1961	7,956	+83.7%
1981	12,866	+61.7%
1986	26,244	+104.0%
1991	26,012	−0.9%

Year	Pop.	±%
1996	25,554	−1.8%
2001	23,079	−9.7%
2006	22,554	−2.3%
2011	22,113	−2.0%
2016	21,536	−2.6%
2021	20,687	−3.9%

Population amounts are not adjusted for boundary changes or merger.
Source: Statistics Canada

Knowledge of official languages from 2021 (multiple answers were possible):

- French only: 16,045
- English only: 15
- French and English: 4,385
- Neither English nor French: 5

Visible minority and Aboriginal population (Canada 2021 Census)
Population group		Population	% of total population
White		18,660	94.3%
Visible minority group Source:	South Asian	15	0.1%
Visible minority group Source:	Chinese	30	0.2%
Visible minority group Source:	Black	205	1%
Visible minority group Source:	Filipino	10	0.1%
Visible minority group Source:	Arab	0	0%
Visible minority group Source:	Latin American	35	0.2%
Visible minority group Source:	Southeast Asian	20	0.1%
Visible minority group Source:	West Asian	0	0%
Visible minority group Source:	Korean	10	0.1%
Visible minority group Source:	Japanese	0	0%
Visible minority group Source:	Visible minority, n.i.e.	0	0%
Visible minority group Source:	Multiple visible minority	0	0%
Total visible minority population		345	1.7%
Aboriginal group Source:	First Nations	385	1.9%
Aboriginal group Source:	Métis	355	1.8%
Aboriginal group Source:	Inuit	10	0.1%
Aboriginal group Source:	Aboriginal, n.i.e.	30	0.2%
Aboriginal group Source:	Multiple Aboriginal identity	0	0%
Total Aboriginal population		790	4%
Total population		19,795	100%

== Economy ==
The region is a major forestry centre for the pulp and paper industry, owned by Abitibi Consolidated as of October 2006. Alongside hydro-electricity and the paper industry, an aluminum plant has fed employment for decades. Cargill has a large elevator there that is used to transfer grain from Great Lakes boats to ocean-going ships.

== Sports ==
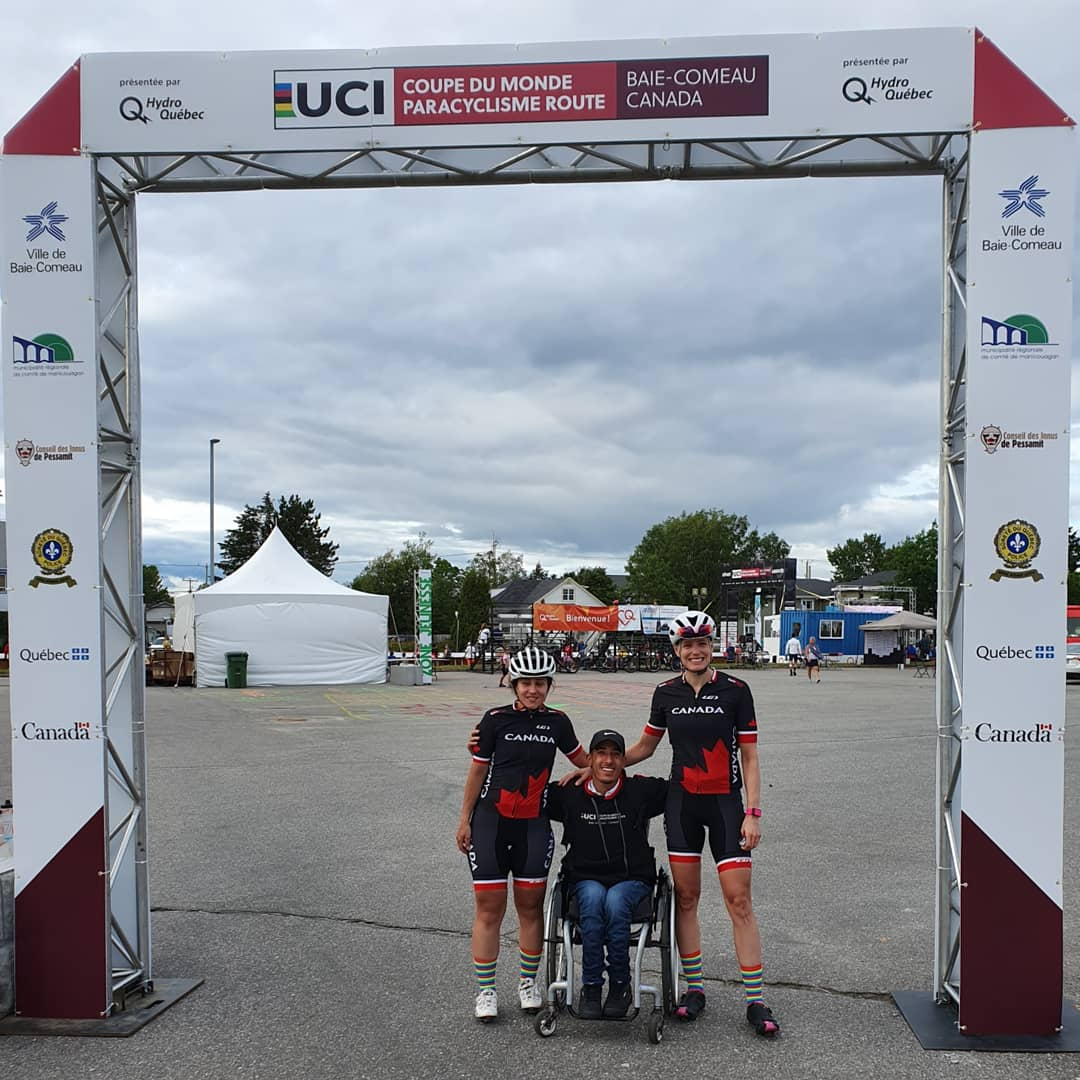
Para-Cyclists at the 2019 UCI Para-Cycling Road World Cup in Baie-Comeau, Canada. Left to right: Carla Shibley, Hassan Dia, Meghan Brown.

The 1993 Quebec Winter Games were played in Baie-Comeau.

Many different sports are played in Baie-Comeau:

=== Hockey ===
Baie-Comeau is home to the Baie-Comeau Drakkar, an ice hockey team playing in the Quebec Maritimes Junior Hockey League since 1997. The team plays in the Centre Henry-Leonard located in the eastern sector of the town.

=== Skiing ===
The Centre de ski du Mont-Tibasse is an alpine ski centre located a few kilometers north of the town where it offers twelve slopes. Cross-country skiing is also popular. Students often frequent Mont-Tibasse as part of their school programs.

=== Golf ===
An 18-hole golf course is available in the western sector of the town. It is a semi-private golf club and is open for most of the summer.

=== Swimming ===
The two major high schools of the city each offer an indoor swimming pool and are open to the public year-round. Two outdoor swimming pools are also available to the public. These are open from the end of June until the middle of August each summer.

Some beaches are also available in the summer. There are other beaches are along the shore of the St. Lawrence river such as the Plage Champlain and the Plage Pointe-Lebel, among others.

=== Tennis ===
Several outdoor tennis courts are available to the public in the different parks across town. They are open for most of the summer.

=== Football ===
The Baie-Comeau Vikings represent the Polyvalente des Baies in the Saguenay-Lac-Saint-Jean League. The team won championships in the eastern Quebec circuit in 2003, 2004 and 2006, and were finalists in 2005.

== Government ==
The Baie-Comeau city council consists of the mayor of Baie-Comeau and eight elected city councillors, four from each of the two sectors of town. One recent mayor of Baie-Comeau was Yves Montigny, who was elected to the National Assembly of Quebec in the 2022 Quebec general election; Michel Desbiens became mayor in 2023.

List of former mayors:

- Ivo Di Piazza (...–2009)
- Christine Brisson (2009–2013)
- Claude Martel (2013–2017)
- Yves Montigny (2017–2022)
- Serge Deschenes (interim, 2022)
- Carole Deschênes (deputy mayor, 2022)
- Michel Desbiens (2023–present)

== Infrastructure ==
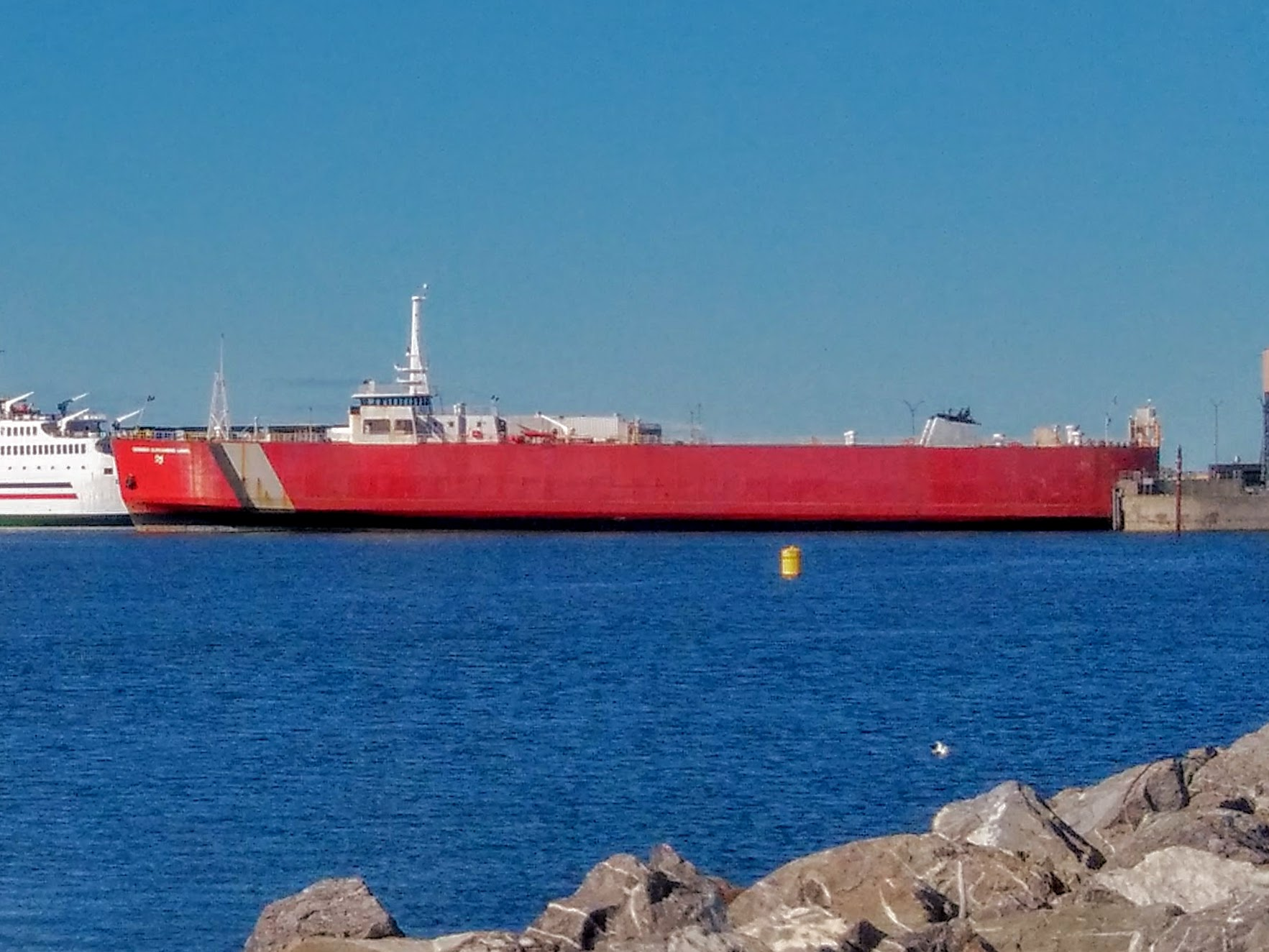
MV Georges-Alexandre-Lebel rail ferry

The town is along Route 138 about 100 km (62 mi) east of Forestville and about 230 km (140 mi) west of Sept-Îles. A ferry service of the Société des traversiers du Québec and rail ferry service of the COGEMA also links the town to Matane on the south shore of the St. Lawrence River. The town is the southern terminus of Route 389, which leads to the Daniel-Johnson Dam, the town of Fermont, and the Labrador region of the province of Newfoundland and Labrador.

The Baie-Comeau Airport, located in neighbouring Pointe-Lebel, has scheduled flights from Air Liaison and Pascan Aviation.

== Education ==
Baie-Comeau is home to several French-language public elementary schools, two French-language public high schools and one English-language public school that includes both the elementary and high school levels of education.

The town is also home to one French-language CEGEP called the Cégep de Baie-Comeau.

List of schools in Baie-Comeau:

School name	Level	Sector
École Bois-Du-Nord	Elementary	Western
École Boisvert	Elementary	Eastern
École Leventoux	Elementary	Eastern
École Mgr-Bélanger	Elementary	Western
École Saint-Cœur-de-Marie	Elementary	Western
École Serge-Bouchard (Note: Formerly known as Polyvalente des Rives)	High School	Western
École Trudel	Elementary	Western
Polyvalente des Baies	High School	Eastern
Baie-Comeau High School (Note: Only English language school in Baie-Comeau)	Elementary and high school	Eastern

== Notable people ==
- Yves Bélanger, ice hockey player
- Jean-Claude Bergeron, ice hockey goaltender
- Sylvie Drapeau, actress
- Andrea Jourdan, author
- Pierre-Cédric Labrie, ice hockey player
- Dave Morissette, ice hockey player
- Brian Mulroney, 18th prime minister of Canada

== See also ==
- List of towns in Quebec
- Amédée Lake
- Castelnau Lake
