= History of Hydro-Québec =

History of the Canadian provincial Crown corporation

Hydro-Québec is a Canadian Crown corporation public utility established in 1944 by the Government of Quebec. The company is in charge of the generation, transmission and distribution of electricity across Quebec. Its head office is located in Montreal.

== Origins ==
In the years after the Great Depression, voices were raised in Quebec asking for a government takeover of the electricity business. Many of the criticisms leveled at the so-called "electricity trust" focused on high rates and excessive profits. Inspired by the example of Adam Beck, who had nationalized much of the electric sector in Ontario in 1906 as the Hydro-Electric Power Commission of Ontario, local politicians, such as Philippe Hamel and Télesphore-Damien Bouchard, strongly advocated moving Quebec towards a similar system. Soon after being elected Premier of Quebec in 1939, Adélard Godbout warmed to the concept of a state-owned utility. Godbout was outraged by the inefficient power system dominated by Anglo-Canadian economic interests and the collusion between the Montreal Light, Heat & Power (MLH&P) and the Shawinigan Water & Power Company, the two main companies involved. At one point, he even called the duopoly an "economic dictatorship, crooked and vicious".

=== 1944: First stage of state control ===
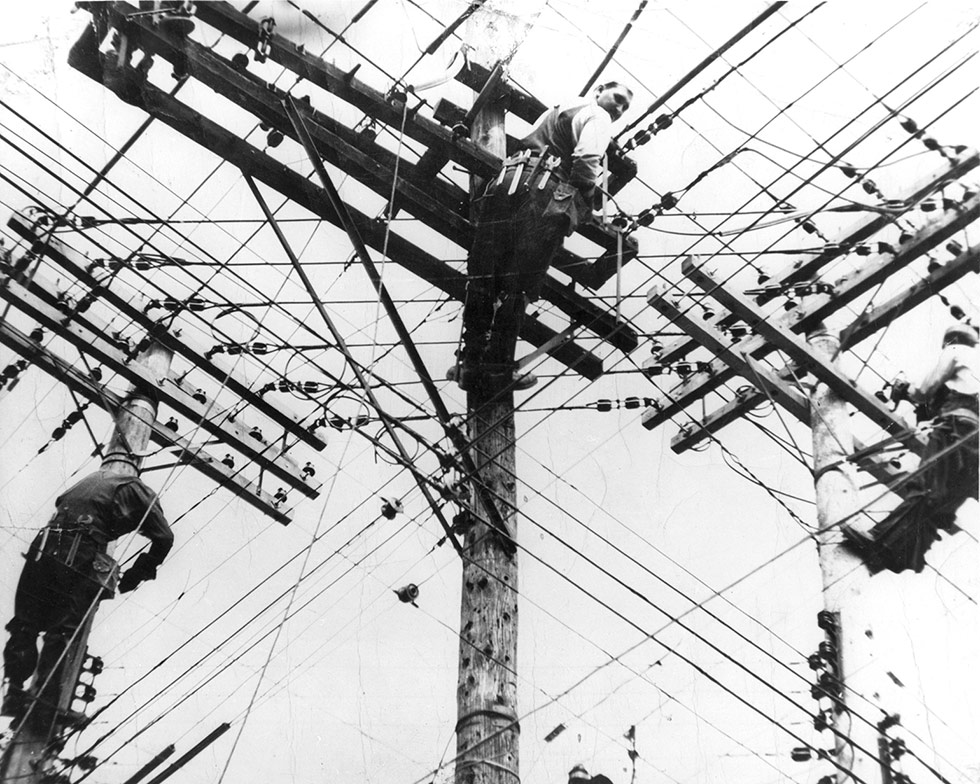
Montreal Light, Heat and Power linesmen.

In the fall of 1943, the Godbout government tabled a bill to take control of MLH&P, the company running the gas and electric distribution in and around Montreal, Quebec's largest city. On April 14, 1944, the Quebec Legislative Assembly passed Bill 17, creating a publicly owned commercial venture, the Quebec Hydroelectric Commission, commonly referred to as Hydro-Québec. The act granted the new Crown corporation an electric and gas distribution monopoly in the Montreal area and mandated Hydro-Québec to serve its customers "at the lowest rates consistent with a sound financial management", to restore the substandard electric grid and to speed up rural electrification in areas with no or limited electric service.

MLH&P was taken over the next day, April 15, 1944. The new management quickly realized that it would need to rapidly increase the company's 600-megawatt generation capacity in the next few years in order to meet growing demand. By 1948, Hydro-Québec had started the expansion of the Beauharnois power station. It then set its eyes on the Bersimis near Forestville, on the North Shore of the Saint Lawrence River, located 700 kilometres (430 mi) east of Montreal. The Bersimis-1 and Bersimis-2 generating stations were built between 1953 and 1959 and were widely considered to be a bench trial for the fledgling company. They also offered a preview of the large developments that occurred over the next three decades in Northern Quebec.

Other construction projects started in the Maurice Duplessis era included a second upgrade of the Beauharnois project and the construction of the Carillon generating station on the Ottawa River. Between 1944 and 1962, Hydro-Québec's installed capacity increased sixfold, from 616 to 3,661 megawatts.

=== 1963: Second stage of state control ===
The onset of the Quiet Revolution in 1960 did not stop the construction of new dams. On the contrary, it brought a new momentum to the company's development under the tutelage of a young and energetic Hydraulic Resources minister. René Lévesque, a 38-year-old former television reporter and a bona fide star of the new Lesage government, was appointed to the Hydro-Québec portfolio as part of the liberal Premier's "équipe du tonnerre" (English: "Dream Team"). Lévesque quickly approved continuation of the ongoing construction work and put together a team to nationalize the 11 remaining private companies that still controlled a substantial share of the electricity generation and distribution business in Quebec.

On February 12, 1962, Lévesque started his public campaign for nationalization. In a speech to the Quebec Electric Industry Association he bluntly called the whole electric business an "unbelievably costly mess". The minister then toured the province in order to reassure the population and refute the arguments of the Shawinigan Water & Power Company, the main opponent of the proposed takeover. On September 4 and 5, 1962, Lévesque finally convinced his liberal cabinet colleagues to go ahead with the plan during a working retreat at a fishing camp north of Quebec City. The issue topped the liberal agenda during a snap election called two years early, and their chosen theme, "Maîtres chez nous" (in English: "Master in our Own Homes"), had a strong nationalist undertone.

The Lesage government was re-elected on November 14, 1962 and Lévesque went ahead with the plan. On Friday, December 28, 1962 at 6 pm, Hydro-Québec launched a hostile takeover, offering to buy all of the stock in 11 companies at a set price, that was slightly above market value: Shawinigan Water & Power, Quebec Power, Southern Canada Power, Saint-Maurice Power, Gatineau Power, la Compagnie de pouvoir du Bas-Saint-Laurent, Saguenay Power, Northern Quebec Power, la Compagnie électrique de Mont-Laurier, la Compagnie électrique de Ferme-Neuve and La Sarre Power. After hedging their bets for a few weeks, management of the firms advised their shareholders to accept the C$604 million government offer. In addition to buying the 11 companies, most electric co-operatives and municipally owned utilities were also taken over and merged with the existing Hydro-Québec operations, which became the largest electric company in Quebec on May 1, 1963.

In 1962, the US government lent Quebec $300 million. The funds were used to acquire independent power companies.

In 1964, the Province of British Columbia provided the Province of Quebec with a $100 million loan. $60 million from that loan went to Hydro-Québec. The loan faced controversy in the Quebec legislature.

== The 1960s and 1970s ==
Following the 1963 nationalization Hydro-Québec had to deal with three problems simultaneously. It first had to reorganize in order to seamlessly merge the new subsidiaries into the existing structure, while standardizing dozens of networks in various state of disrepair and upgrading large parts of the Abitibi system from 25 to 60 Hz.

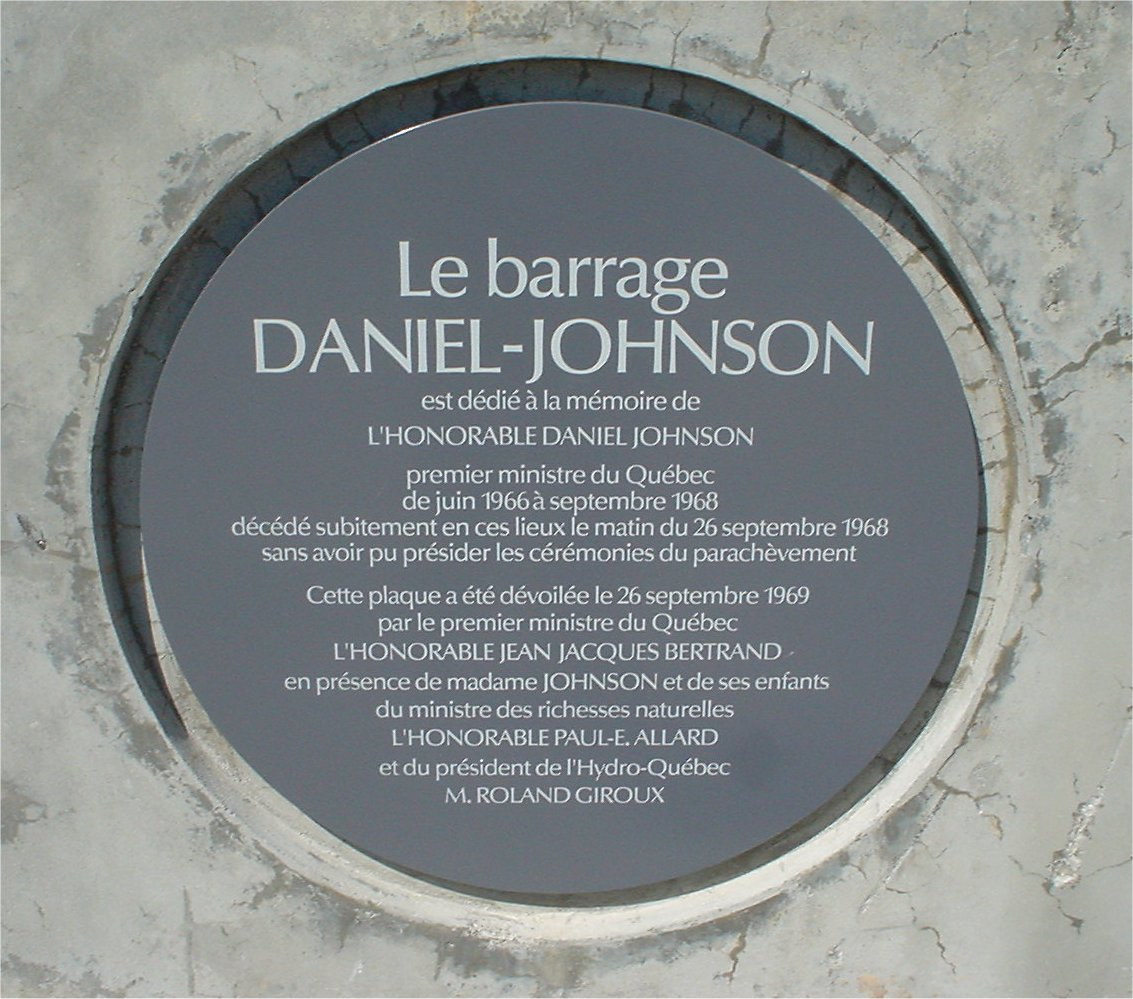
A plaque dedicates the Daniel-Johnson dam, named to honour Quebec Premier Daniel Johnson, Sr., who died at this location, in September 1968.

All of this had to be done while construction of the Manic-Outardes Complex was underway on the North Shore. By 1959, thousands of workers were building 7 new hydroelectric stations, including the 1,314-metre (4,311 ft) wide Daniel-Johnson Dam, the largest of its kind in the world. Construction on the Manicouagan and Outardes rivers was completed in 1978 with the inauguration of the Outardes-2 generating station.

These large projects raised a new problem that occupied company engineers for a few years: the transmission of the large amounts of power produced by generating stations located hundreds of kilometres away from the urban centres in southern Quebec in an economical fashion. A young engineer named Jean-Jacques Archambault drafted a plan to build 735 kV power lines, a much higher voltage than what was used at the time. Archambault persisted and managed to convince his colleagues and major equipment suppliers of the viability of his plan. The first 735 kV power line was put into commercial service on November 29, 1965.

=== Churchill Falls ===
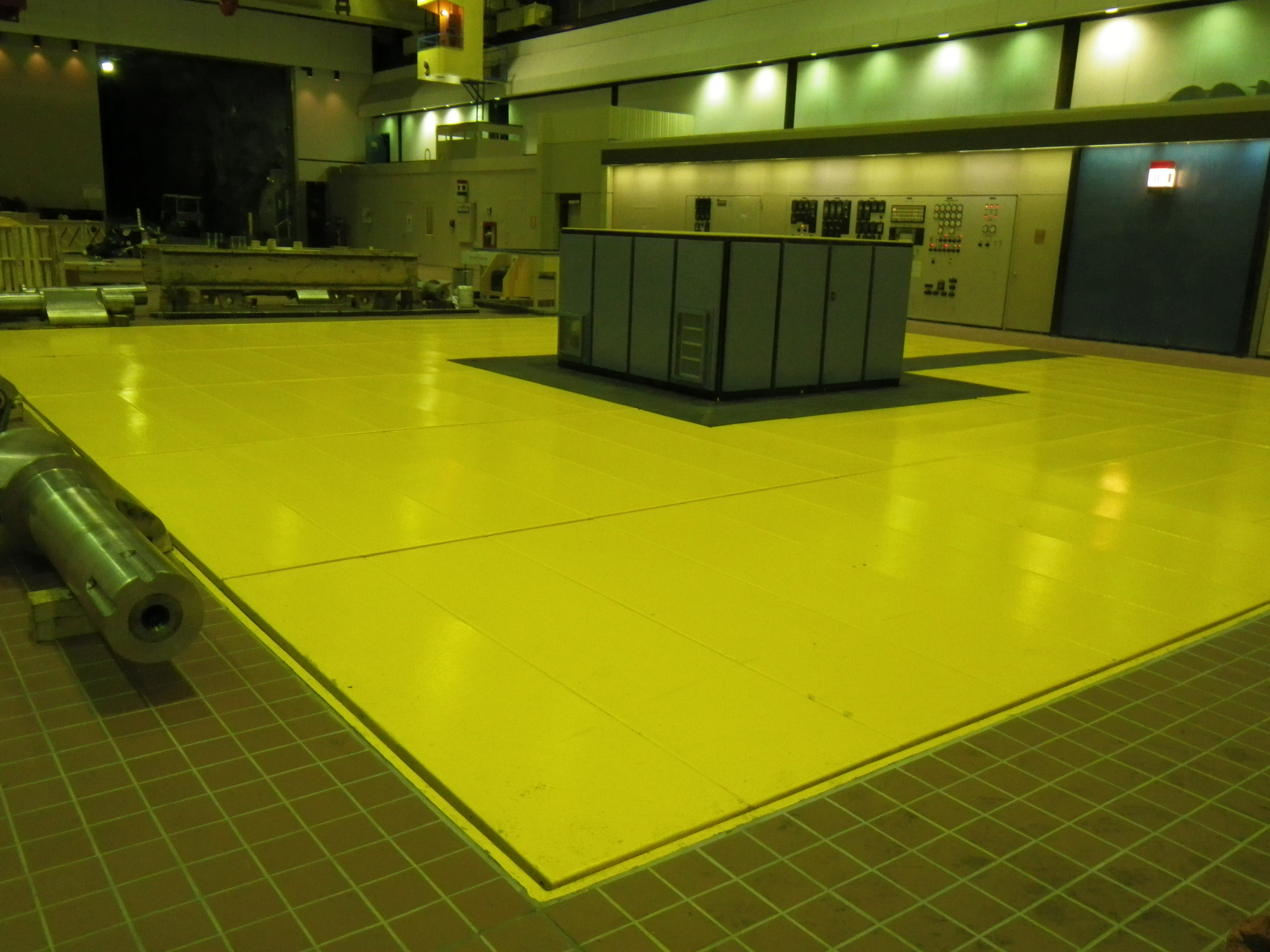
Hydro-Québec provided financial support in the construction of the Churchill Falls Generating Station in Labrador. The company holds a 34.2% interest in the joint venture owning the 5,425-MW plant.

When it bought the Shawinigan Water & Power Company, Hydro-Québec acquired a 20% share of a planned hydroelectric facility at Grand Falls (Note: The falls were renamed to honour the late British Prime Minister, Sir Winston Churchill, soon after his death, in 1965.) in Labrador, a project led by a consortium of banks and industrialists, British Newfoundland Corporation Limited (Brinco). After years of hard bargaining, the parties reached a deal on May 12, 1969 to finance the construction of the power plant. The agreement committed Hydro-Québec to buy most of the plant's output at one-quarter of a cent per kilowatt-hour for 65 years, and to enter into a risk-sharing agreement. Hydro-Québec would cover part of the interest risk and buy some of Brinco's debt, in exchange for a 34.2% share in the company owning the plant, Churchill Falls (Labrador) Corporation Limited. The 5,428-megawatt Churchill Falls generating station delivered its first kilowatts on December 6, 1971. Its 11 turbines were fully operational by June 1974.

In the aftermath of the 1973 oil crisis, the Government of Newfoundland, unhappy with the terms of the agreement, bought all of the shares in CF(L)Co that were not held by Hydro-Québec. The Newfoundland government then asked to reopen the contract, a demand refused by Hydro-Québec. After a protracted legal battle between the two neighbouring provinces, the contract's validity was twice affirmed by the Supreme Court of Canada, in 1984 and 1988.

In December 2024, Newfoundland premier Andrew Furey and Quebec premier François Legault signed a 50-year Memorandum of understanding that terminated the original contract. If ratified by both provinces, the rates Hydro-Quebec pays for Churchill Falls electricity would rise by 2,850% and Quebec would pay Newfoundland and Labrador Hydro $3.5 billion for co-development rights for two anticipated Churchill River energy projects. At the press conference announcing the deal, Furey symbolically tore up a copy of the 1969 agreement.

=== The nuclear option ===
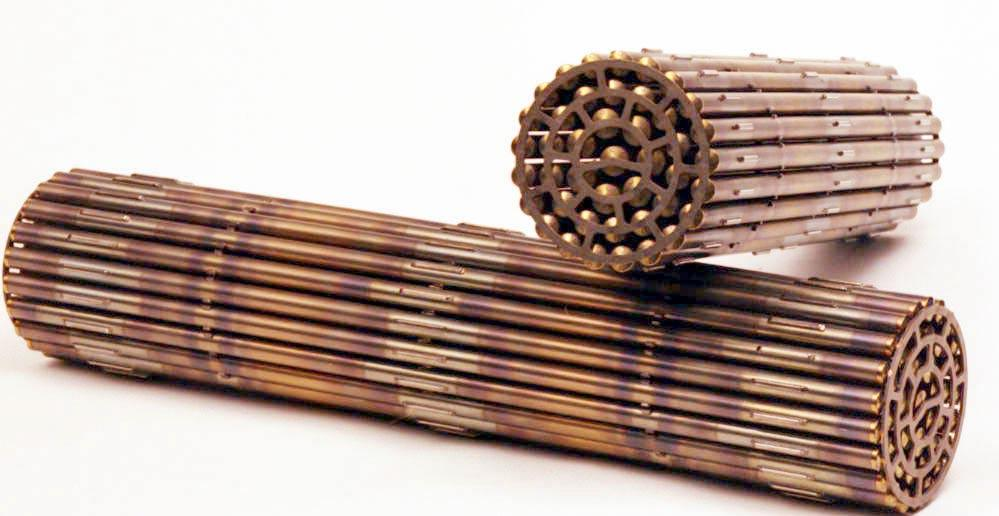
CANDU fuel bundles. Hydro-Québec operated a single nuclear power plant, the Gentilly-2 generating station in Bécancour for 29 years.

In the late 1960s and early 1970s, Hydro-Québec briefly considered building nuclear power plants to meet the energy needs of Quebec. The company partnered with Atomic Energy of Canada Limited (AECL) to build two CANDU nuclear reactors, in Bécancour, on the south shore of the Saint Lawrence River, opposite Trois-Rivières, the Gentilly nuclear generating station.

The first reactor, Gentilly-1, was a 266-megawatt CANDU-BWR unit, built between 1966 and 1970. Except for two brief periods, extending over 183 days in 1972, the plant was never put in commercial operation. In 1980, the plant was mothballed by AECL, which still owns the plant.

The second plant, Gentilly-2, is a 675-megawatt CANDU-PHW unit commissioned in 1983, after a 10-year construction period. On August 19, 2008, after several years of studies, the government of Quebec and Hydro-Québec announced its decision to go ahead with Gentilly-2's refurbishment in 2011 and 2012 at a cost of C$1.9 billion. The project was to extend the plant's useful life until 2035. However, on October 3, 2012, the Québec government announced it would accept Hydro-Québec's recommendation to shut down Gentilly-2. The cost to shut the plant down was estimated at $2 billion, whereas the estimate for the cost of a refurbishment had increased to $4.3 billion. The plant shutdown on December 28, 2012.

=== "The Project of the Century" ===
Almost a year to the day after his April 1970 election, Quebec Premier Robert Bourassa launched a project which he hoped would help him fulfill a campaign promise to create 100,000 new jobs. On April 30, 1971, in front of a gathering of loyal liberal supporters, he announced plans for the construction of a 10,000-megawatt hydroelectric complex in the James Bay area. After assessing three possible options, Hydro-Québec and the government chose to build three new dams on La Grande River, named LG-2, LG-3 and LG-4.

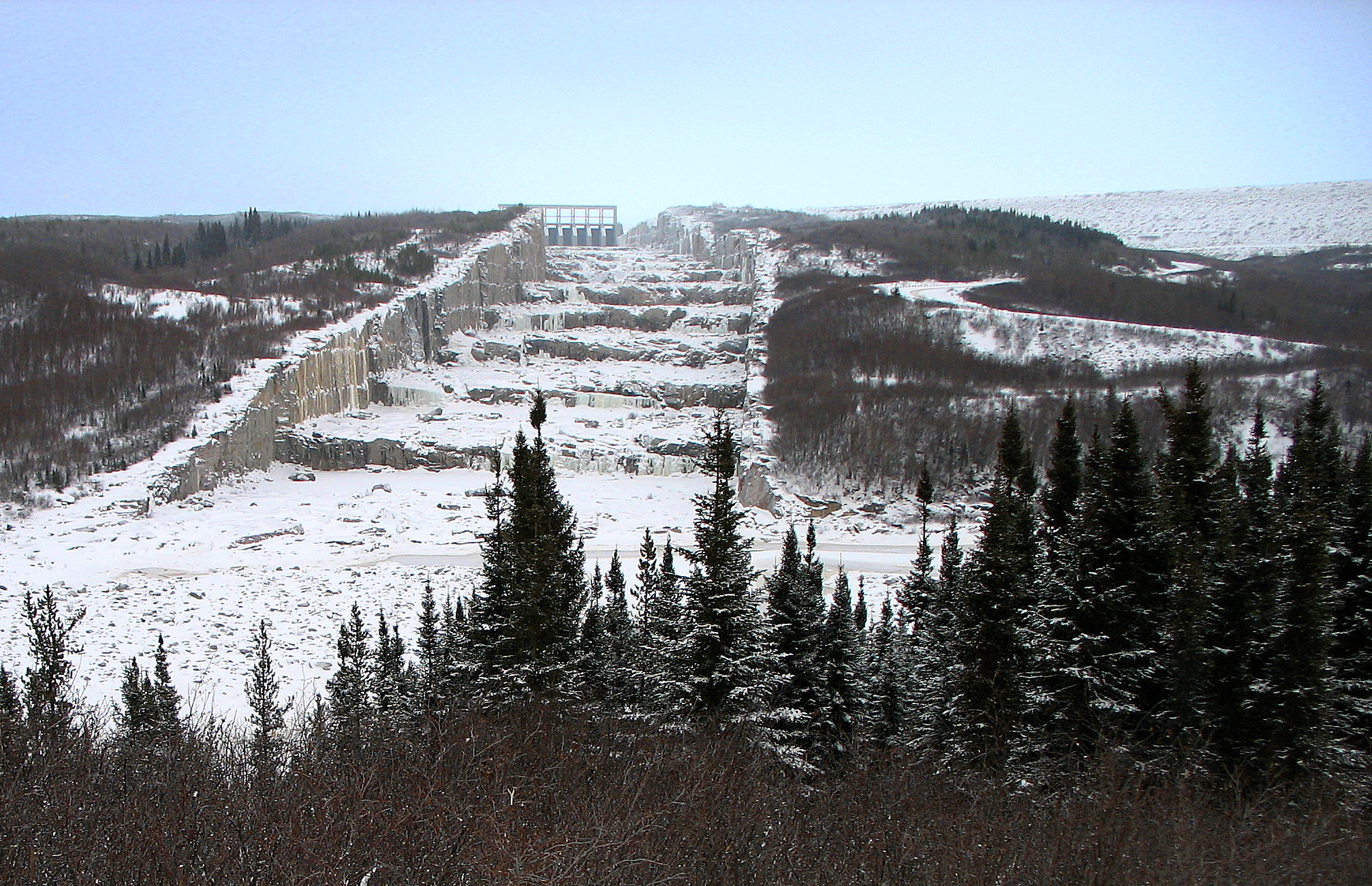
The spillway at the Robert-Bourassa generating station can deal with a water flow twice as large as the Saint Lawrence River. Inaugurated in 1979, the 5,616-megawatt generating station is the centerpiece of the James Bay Project.

On top of the technical and logistical challenges posed by a public works project of this scope in a harsh and remote setting, the man in charge, Société d'énergie de la Baie James president Robert A. Boyd, had to face the opposition of the 5,000 Cree residents of the area, who had grave concerns about the project's impact on their traditional lifestyle. In November 1973, the Crees got a preliminary injunction that temporarily stopped the construction of the basic infrastructure needed to build the dams, forcing the Bourassa government to negotiate with them.

After a year of difficult negotiations, the Quebec and Canadian governments, Hydro-Québec, the Société d'énergie de la Baie James and the Grand Council of the Crees signed the James Bay and Northern Quebec Agreement on November 11, 1975. The agreement granted the Crees financial compensation and the management of health and education services in their communities in exchange for the continuation of the project.

Between 14,000 and 18,000 tradesmen were employed on various James Bay construction sites in the period stretching from 1977 to 1981. Inaugurated on October 27, 1979, the LG-2 generating station, an underground powerhouse with a peak capacity of 5,616 megawatts is the most powerful of its kind in the world. The station, the dam and the associated reservoir were renamed in honour of Premier Bourassa a few weeks after his death in 1996. The construction of the first phase of the project was completed with the commissioning of LG-3 in June 1982 and of LG-4 in 1984. A second phase of the project was built between 1987 and 1996, adding five more power plants to the complex.

== The 1980s and 1990s ==
=== A controversial power line to the US ===
After two consecutive decades of sustained growth, the late 1980s and the 1990s were much more difficult for Hydro-Québec, especially on the environmental front. A new hydroelectric development and the construction of a direct current high voltage line built to export power to New England faced strong opposition from the Crees as well as environmental groups from the US and Canada.

In order to export power from the James Bay Project to New England, Hydro-Québec planned the construction of a 1,200-kilometre (750 mi) long direct current power line, with a capacity of 2,000 megawatts, the so-called "Réseau multiterminal à courant continu" (English: Direct Current Multiterminal Network). Construction work on the line went without a problem except at the location where the power line had to cross the Saint Lawrence River, between Grondines and Lotbinière.

Facing strong opposition from local residents to other options, Hydro-Québec built a 4-kilometre (2.5 mi) tunnel under the river, at a cost of C$144 million, which delayed the project completion by two and a half years. The line was finally commissioned on November 1, 1992.

=== Great Whale Project ===
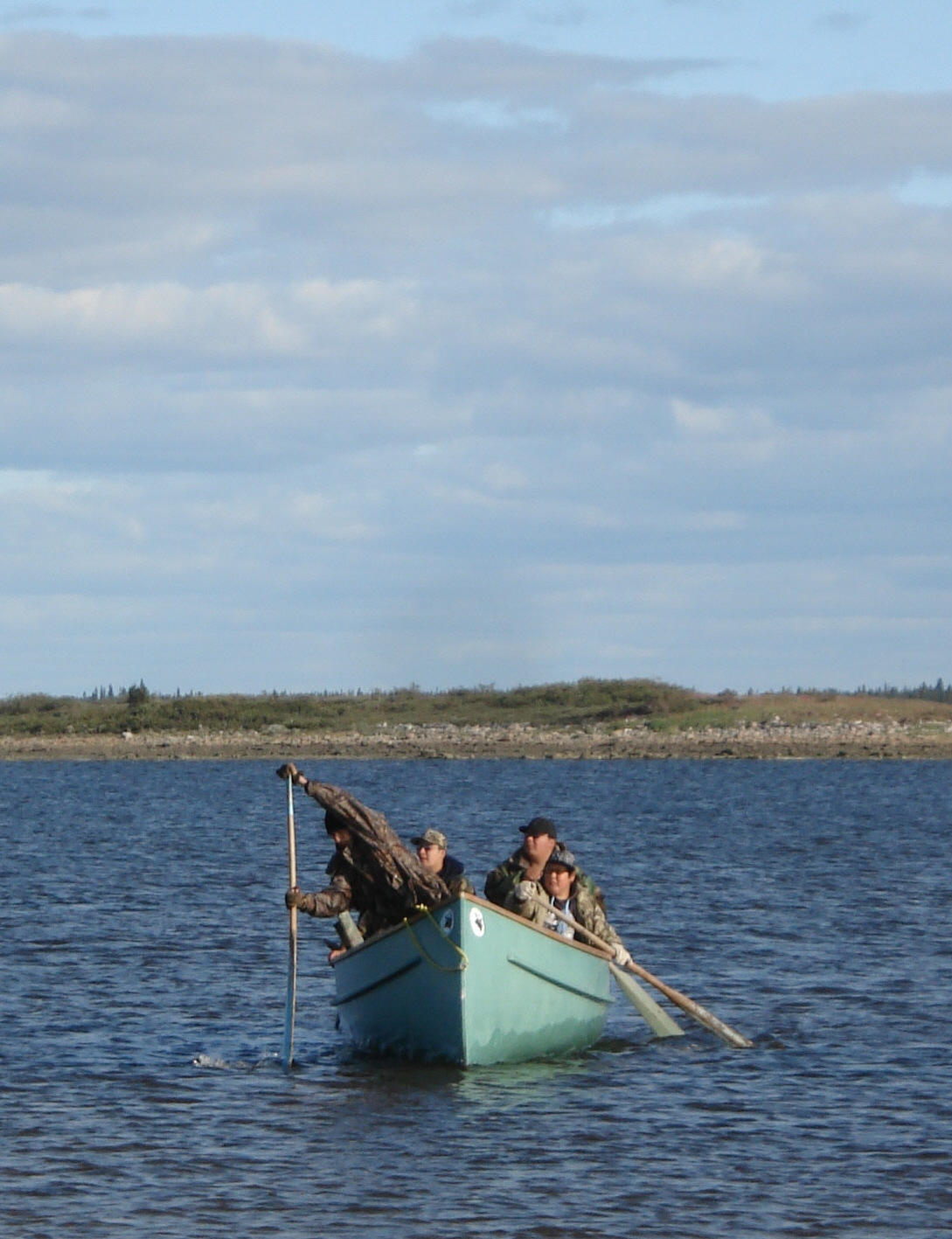
The Crees from Northern Quebec strongly opposed the Great Whale Project in the early 1990s.

Hydro-Québec and the Bourassa government had a much harder time circumventing the next hurdle in northern Quebec. Robert Bourassa was re-elected in late 1985 after a 9-year hiatus. Shortly after taking office he announced yet another hydro development in the James Bay area. The C$12.6 billion Great Whale Project involved the construction of three new generating stations with a combined capacity of 3,160 megawatts. It was to produce 16.3 terawatt-hours of energy each year by the time it was completed in 1998–1999.

The plan immediately proved controversial. As they had in 1973, the Cree people opposed the project and filed lawsuits against Hydro-Québec in Quebec and Canada to prevent its construction, and also took action in many US states to prevent sales of the electricity there.

The Crees succeeded in getting the Canadian federal government to establish a parallel environmental assessment process in order to delay construction. Cree leaders also got support from US-based environmental groups and launched a public relation campaign in the US and in Europe, attacking the Great Whale Project, Hydro-Québec and Quebec in general. Launched in the months following the failure of the Meech Lake Accord and the Oka Crisis, the campaign prompted a coalition of Quebec-based environmental groups to dissociate themselves from the Cree campaign.

However, the Cree campaign was successful in New York State, where the New York Power Authority cancelled a US$5 billion power contract signed with Hydro-Québec in 1990. Two months after the 1994 general election, the new Premier, Jacques Parizeau, announced the suspension of the Great Whale Project, declaring it unnecessary in order to meet Quebec's energy needs.

The moratorium on new hydro projects in northern Quebec after the Great Whale cancellation forced the company's management to develop new sources of electricity to meet increasing demand. In September 2001, Hydro-Québec announced its intention to build a new combined cycle gas turbine plant—the Centrale du Suroît plant—in Beauharnois, southwest of Montreal, stressing the pressing need to secure additional electricity supply to mitigate against any shortfall in the water cycle of its reservoirs. Hydro's rationale also stressed the cost-effectiveness of the plant and the fact that it could be built within a two-year period.

The announcement came at a bad time since attention was drawn to the ratification by Canada of the Kyoto Protocol. With estimated emissions levels of 2.25 Mt of carbon dioxide per year, the Suroît plant would have increased the provincial CO_{2} emissions by nearly 3%. Faced with a public uproar — a poll conducted in January 2004 found that two of every three Quebecers were opposed to it—the Jean Charest government abandoned the project in November 2004.

=== Battling the elements ===
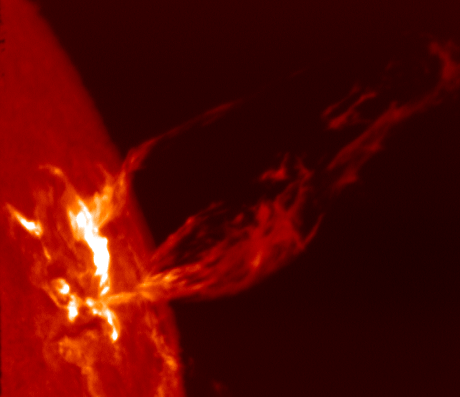
A solar eruption caused a province-wide blackout, on March 13, 1989.

During the same period, Hydro-Québec had to deal with three major disruptions to its electric transmission system that were primarily caused by natural disasters. The incidents highlighted a major weakness of Hydro's system: the great distances between the generation facilities and the main markets of southern Quebec.

==== Two blackouts in a year ====
On April 18, 1988 at 2:05 am, all of Quebec and parts of New England and New Brunswick lost power because of an equipment failure at a critical substation on the North Shore, between Churchill Falls and the Manicouagan area. The blackout, which lasted for up to 8 hours in some areas, was caused by ice deposits on transformer equipment at the Arnaud substation.

Less than a year later, on March 13, 1989 at 2:44 am, a large geomagnetic storm caused variations in the Earth's magnetic field, tripping circuit breakers on the transmission network. The James Bay network went off line in less than 90 seconds, giving Quebec its second blackout in 11 months. The power failure lasted 9 hours, and forced Hydro-Québec to implement a program to reduce the risks associated with geomagnetically induced currents.

==== Ice storm of 1998 ====
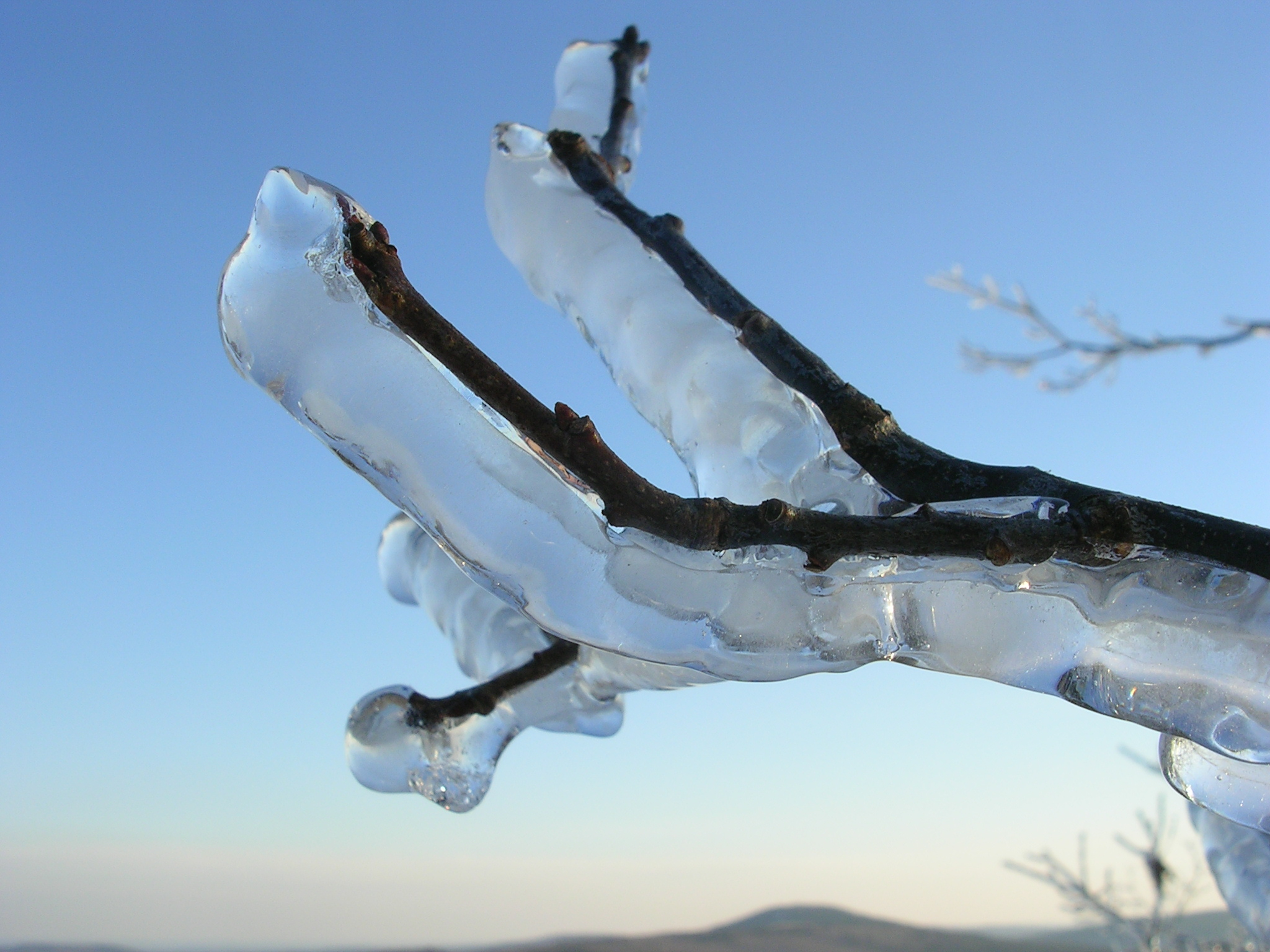
The North American ice storm of January 1998 left 1.4 million Hydro-Québec customers in the dark for up to five weeks.

In January 1998, five consecutive days of heavy freezing rain caused the largest power failure in Hydro-Québec's history. The weight of the ice collapsed 600 kilometres (370 mi) of high voltage power lines and over 3,000 kilometres (1,900 mi) of medium and low voltage distribution lines in southern Quebec. Up to 1.4 million Hydro-Québec customers were forced to live without power for up to five weeks.

Part of the Montérégie region, south of Montreal, was the worst hit area and became known as the Triangle of Darkness (French: Triangle noir) by the media and the population. Ice accumulation exceeded 100 millimetres (4 in) in some locations. Customers on the Island of Montreal and in the Outaouais region were also hit by the power outage, causing significant concerns since many Quebec households use electricity for heating.

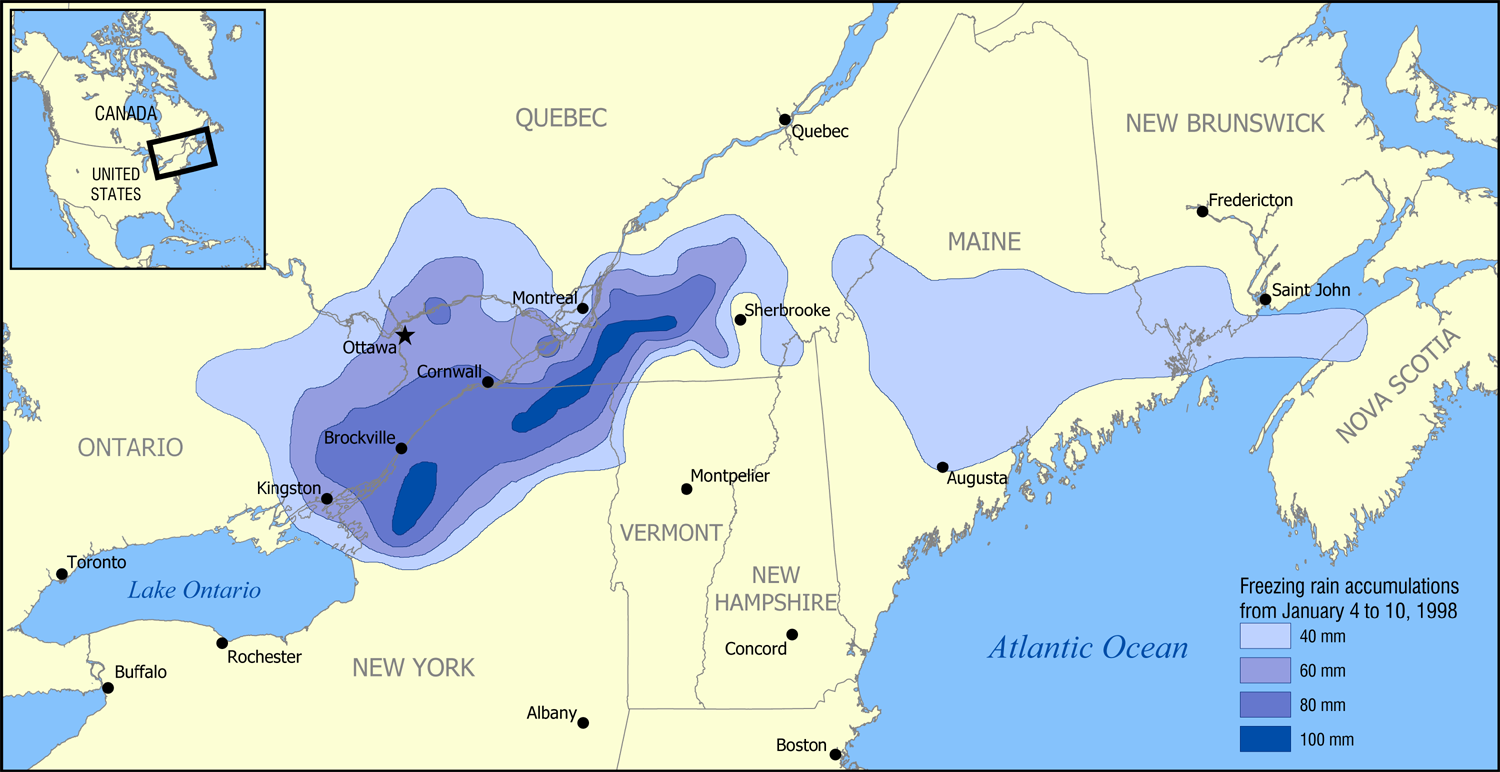
The ice storm affected a large part of eastern Ontario, southwest Quebec, and New York state. This map shows the accumulation of freezing rain in those areas.

Hydro-Québec immediately mobilized all crews, including retirees, and asked for the assistance of utility crews from Eastern Canada and the northeastern US. The Canadian Army was also involved in the restoration of power. More than 10,000 workers had to rebuild a significant portion of the network one pylon at a time. At the height of the crisis, on January 9, 1998, the island of Montreal was fed by a single power line. The situation was so dire the Quebec government temporarily resorted to rolling blackouts in downtown Montreal in order to maintain the city's drinking water supply.

Electric service was fully restored on February 7, 1998, 34 days later. The storm cost Hydro-Québec C$725 million in 1998 and over C$1 billion was invested in the following decade to strengthen the power grid against similar events. However, part of the operation needed to close the 735 kV loop around Montreal was approved at the height of the crisis without prior environmental impact assessment and quickly ran into opposition from residents of the Val Saint-François area in the Eastern Townships. The opponents went to court to quash the Order in Council authorizing the power line.

Construction work resumed after the National Assembly passed a law retroactively approving the work done in the immediate aftermath of the ice storm, but it also required public hearings on the remaining projects. Construction of the Hertel-Des Cantons high voltage line was properly approved in July 2002 and commissioned a year later.

== The 2000s ==
=== New hydroelectric developments ===
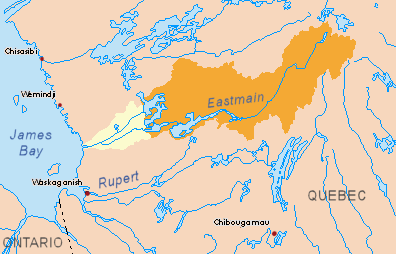
the Rupert River diversion will channel part of the natural flow of the river (orange on the map) to the Robert-Bourassa Reservoir.

After a pause in the 1990s, Hydro-Québec restarted its construction activities in the early years of the 21st century. Recent projects include the Sainte-Marguerite-3 (SM-3) station in 2004 (884 megawatts); Toulnustouc in 2005 (526 megawatts); Eastmain-1 in 2007 (480 megawatts); Peribonka (385 megawatts) and Mercier in 2008 (50.5 megawatts), Rapides-des-Cœurs (76 megawatts) and Chute-Allard (62 megawatts) in 2009.

On February 7, 2002, Premier Bernard Landry and Ted Moses, the head of the Grand Council of the Crees, signed an agreement allowing the construction of new hydroelectric projects in northern Quebec. The Paix des Braves agreement clarified some provisions of the James Bay and Northern Quebec Agreement, granted a C$4.5 billion compensation to the Cree Nation to be paid over a 50-year period, established a special wildlife and forestry regime, and gave assurances that Cree businesses and workers would get a share of the economic spin offs of future construction projects in the area.

In return, the Cree nation agreed not to challenge new construction projects in the area, such as the Eastmain-1 generating station—authorized by the government in March 1993—and the partial diversion of the Rupert River to the Robert-Bourassa Reservoir, subject to a number of provisions regarding the protection of the natural and social environment.

Construction on the first 480-megawatt plant started in the spring of 2002 with a road linking the project site to the Nemiscau substation 80 kilometres (50 mi) away. In addition to the plant, built on the left bank of the Eastmain River, the project required the construction of a 890-metre (2,920 ft) wide and 70-metre (230 ft) tall dam, 33 smaller dams and a spillway. The three generating units of Eastmain-1 entered into service in the spring of 2007. The plant has an annual output of 2.7 terawatt-hours.

These projects are part of Quebec's 2006–2015 energy strategy. The document called for the development of 4,500 megawatts of new hydroelectric generation, including the development of the 1,550 MW Romaine River complex, under construction since May 2009, the integration 4,000 megawatts of wind power, increased electricity exports and the implementation of new energy efficiency programs.

=== Failed expansion in the Maritime provinces ===
On October 29, 2009, the premiers of New Brunswick, Shawn Graham, and Quebec, Jean Charest, signed a controversial memorandum of understanding to transfer most assets of NB Power to Hydro-Québec. The C$4.75 billion agreement would have transferred most generation, transmission and distribution assets of the New Brunswick Crown corporation to a subsidiary of the Quebec utility, including the Point Lepreau Nuclear Generating Station and 7 hydroelectric plants, but would exclude three thermal generating stations in Dalhousie, Belledune and Coleson Cove. The deal also included provisions to reduce industrial power rates at the levels offered by Hydro-Québec to similar customers and a 5-year rate freeze on residential and commercial rates. The controversial scheme was subject to review and approval by the New Brunswick Legislative Assembly.

Hydro-Québec would pay C$750 million from its cash flow and issue C$4 billion in bonds. CEO Thierry Vandal stated the deal would allow Hydro-Québec to double its sales to the United States by 2011, but some, like New England Power Generators Association president, Angela O'Connor, worried that it could be standing in the way of Canadian competitors from exporting energy to New England. However, these worries were unfounded, responded Jean-Thomas Bernard, chair of Electricity economics at Université Laval, in Quebec City, since non-discrimatory policies set by the US Federal Energy Regulatory Commission guaranteed open access to the North American power grid. "Since Hydro-Québec is already a major exporter to the United States, they would do nothing to jeopardize the agreements". Pierre-Marcel Desjardins, an economist at the Université de Moncton, stated that right now the grid is full so Hydro-Québec could slow the development of new transmission lines but it could be more difficult to develop additional transmission for new energy projects. Hydro-Québec's Vandal responds to this criticism by stating his company's intention to invest in extra transmission capacity to New England.

Two weeks after the New Brunswick announcement, Charest announced the start of formal discussions with the government of Prince Edward Island, on November 13, 2009. The talks between the two provinces could lead to a long-term supply contract with Hydro-Québec, the sale of Maritime Electric, the province's main electric distributor owned by Fortis Inc., and the construction of a submarine transmission line linking PEI and the Magdalen Islands.

After two months of controversies, New Brunswick and Quebec representatives signed a second agreement, reducing the scope of the sale. The Globe and Mail and Radio-Canada both reported on January 18, 2010 that the sale would involve the hydroelectric and nuclear power plant, which would be bought by Hydro-Québec for C$3.4 billion. The government of New Brunswick would still own the transmission and distribution divisions and NB Power would enter into a long-term power purchase agreement with Hydro-Québec. The PPA would allow NB Power to deliver the rate freeze for residential and general customers. However, the industrial rates rollback would be smaller than under the original MOU.

On March 24, 2010, Premier Graham announced the deal had fallen through, due to Hydro-Québec's concern over unanticipated risks and costs of some aspects such as dam security and water levels.

== Hydro-Québec's evolution ==
Hydro-Québec evolution, 1944-2008
	Installed capacity (in megawatts)	Sales (in terawatt-hours)	Residential customers (in thousands)	Employees
1944	616	5.3	249	n/a
1949	810	6.2	295	2,014
1954	1,301	8.1	362	2,843
1959	2,906	13.7	475	3,439
1964	6,562	35.3	1,322	10,261
1969	9,809	46.8	1,567	11,890
1974	11,123	78.3	1,842	13,679
1979	14,475	97.0	2,108	17,880
1984	23,480	123.8	2,446	18,560
1989	25,126	137.6	2,802	19,437
1994	30,100	157.0	3,060	20,800
1999	31,505	171.7	3,206	17,277
2004	33,892	180.8	3,400	18,835
2008	36,429	191.7	3,603	19,297
2015	36,912	201.1	n/a	19,794

== See also ==
- Montreal Light, Heat & Power
- Shawinigan Water & Power Company
- Gatineau Power Company
- James Bay Project
- Hydro-Québec's electricity transmission system
- Timeline of Quebec history
- Nationalization of Electricity in Quebec
