= Lake Manouane (Mont-Valin) =

Lake in Mont-Valin, Quebec, Canada

Lake Péribonca
- Location within Quebec
- Location: Mont-Valin, Le Fjord-du-Saguenay Regional County Municipality, Quebec
- Coordinates: 50°42′18″N 70°44′57″W
- Primary inflows: Petite rivière des Perdrix Blanches, rivière des Montagnes Blanches
- Primary outflows: Manouane River (Péribonka River) and Bonnard River
- Basin countries: Canada
- Max. length: 54 kilometres (34 mi)
- Max. width: 33 kilometres (21 mi)
- Surface area: 461 kilometres (286 mi)
- Surface elevation: 490 kilometres (300 mi)

Lake Péribonca is a freshwater body of the unorganized territory of Mont-Valin, Quebec, in Le Fjord-du-Saguenay Regional County Municipality, in the administrative region of Saguenay-Lac-Saint-Jean, in Quebec, Canada.

By the middle of the 19th century, forestry was the predominant economic activity of the sector; recreational tourism activities, second; hydroelectricity, third. This large body of water is generally frozen from mid-November to the end of April; however, the period of safe ice traffic is usually from mid-December to the end of March.

== Geography ==
The main hydrographic slopes near Manouane Lake are:

- North side: Petite rivière des Perdrix Blanche, rivière des Montagnes Blanches, Manouanis Lake, Manouanis River, Falconio River, Perches River, Piacouadie Lake;
- East side: Opitoune Lake, Perdu Lake, Lac des Prairies, Echo River, Canton River, Manouanis River, Betsiamites River, Praslin River, Villéon River;
- South side: Manouane River, Little Manouane River, Duhamel River, Lake Péribonka;
- West side: Péribonka River, Bonnard River, Modeste River, Petite rivière des Perdrix Blanche, Onistagane Lake.

Located in the forest, about 250 kilometres (160 mi) northeast of Lac Saint-Jean, this lake covers an area of 461 square kilometres (178 sq mi). The shape of this lake is very complex, because the banks form many peninsulas, in its periphery of more than 420 kilometres (260 mi). The many bays are wide and deep, including: Bay of Mauves, Portage, Bellevue, Nouvelle, Suprenante, Foxes, Rocks and "Mica". The toponym of this last bay originates from the presence of this ore discovered in the sector. This lake is also distinguished by its many islands.

Several streams feed Lake Manouane, including the rivière des Montagnes Blanches. Manouane Lake empties into the Manouane River, one of the main tributaries of the Péribonka River, which crosses several lakes: Opitouane Lake, Opitounis, Otapoco and Shortcut. The construction of dams at the Manouane Lake outlet in 1940-1941, resulting in the raising of the water level, increased the area of the lake by 25%. Other dams were built upstream. One of these works, all in wood, is the longest of its kind in Quebec with more than 500 metres (1,600 ft). This dam development made it possible to create a reservoir to control the water supply of the hydroelectric plants located downstream on the Péribonka River.The mouth of Lake Manouane is located on the southeast shore, at:

- 16.3 kilometres (10.1 mi) south-west of Manouanis Lake;
- 18.8 kilometres (11.7 mi) south-west of Perdu Lake;
- 16.1 kilometres (10.0 mi) south-east of the mouth of the Montagnes Blanches;
- 27.6 kilometres (17.1 mi) north-east of the second outlet of Manouane Lake, the Bonnard River;
- 80.5 kilometres (50.0 mi) north of the mouth of the Little Manouane River (confluence with the Manouane River;
- 98.4 kilometres (61.1 mi) north of the dam at the mouth of Lake Péribonka;
- 238.4 kilometres (148.1 mi) north of the mouth of the Péribonka River (confluence with lac Saint-Jean).

From the mouth of Manouane Lake, the current flows southward on the Manouane River, on 143.3 kilometres (89.0 mi) southerly the course of the Péribonka River, crosses Lac Saint-Jean East on 29.3 kilometres (18.2 mi), and then on 155 kilometres (96 mi) the course of the Saguenay River east to Tadoussac where it meets with the St. Lawrence River.

== Toponymy ==
Although the name "Lake Manouane" was officially adopted in 1945, this designation appears on a map of 1705 in the form of Manouan. In the course of history, this place name has known several related spellings: Manuan, Manowan, Manouan. The designation is of Montagnais origin, Manauan Shakaika meaning "lake where we collect eggs". This term would be derived from "manneu", meaning "to remove by hand", from uau, egg, and shakaikan. The Montagnais practiced a custom of going to raise the eggs of birds in the islands and on the shores of this lake.

The toponym Lake Manouane was formalized on December 5, 1968 at the Bank of Place Names of the Commission de toponymie du Québec.

== See also ==
- Mont-Valin, an unorganized territory
- Le Fjord-du-Saguenay, a Regional County Municipality of Quebec (MRC)
- Petite rivière des Perdrix Blanches
- Péribonka River
- Rivière Manouane
- Bonnard River
- Rivière des Montagnes Blanches
