= Moncouche Lake (Mont-Valin) =

Lake in Mont-Valin, Quebec, Canada

- Location in Quebec
- Location: Mont-Valin (TNO), Le Fjord-du-Saguenay Regional County Municipality, Saguenay–Lac-Saint-Jean
- Coordinates: 47.95778°N 71.95722°W
- Lake type: Natural
- Primary inflows: (clockwise from the mouth) Lac Dino, Doumic Lake, lac du Diamant, décharge des lacs Clair, des Jumeaux et Bernières, décharge d’un ensemble de lacs dont Dugal et du Détour, décharge du lac Montplaisir, décharge du lac Belette, décharge du lac Jacob.
- Primary outflows: Maingard Lake
- Basin countries: Canada
- Max. length: 8.0 km (5.0 mi)
- Max. width: 7.1 km (4.4 mi)
- Surface area: 15 km^{2} (5.8 sq mi)
- Surface elevation: 700 m (2,300 ft)

The Moncouche Lake is a freshwater body of the watershed of the rivière aux Sables, flowing in the unorganized territory of Mont-Valin, in the Le Fjord-du-Saguenay Regional County Municipality, in the administrative region of the Saguenay–Lac-Saint-Jean, in the province of Quebec, in Canada. Most of the area is included in the northwestern part of the territory of zec Martin-Valin, in the township of Garreau. Forestry is the main economic activity in the sector. Recreational and tourist activities come second.

The forest road R0208 (North–south direction) serves the eastern side of Lac Le Marié and the upper part of Rivière aux Sables. In contrast, on the east side, the forest road R0201 (north–south direction) serves the valley of the Saint-Louis River. A few other secondary forest roads serve the vicinity of Lake Moncouche for the purposes of forestry and recreational tourism activities.

The surface of lake Moncouche is usually frozen from the end of November to the beginning of April, however the safe circulation on the ice is generally made from mid-December to the end of March.

== Geography ==
The main watersheds near Lake Moncouche are:

- North side: Wapishish River, Poulin River, rivière aux Sables, rivière aux Castors (rivière aux Sables);
- East side: Doumic Lake, Betsiamites Lake, lac Le Marié, brook Liégeois;
- South side: Sainte-Marguerite River, rivière à la Cruche, Bras de l'Enfer;
- West side: Saint-Louis River, Nisipi River, Étienne River (Shipshaw River).

Lac Moncouche is located entirely in the forest in the unorganized territory of Mont-Valin. Lac Moncouche has a length of 8.0 kilometres (5.0 mi), a maximum width of 7.1 kilometres (4.4 mi) and an altitude of 700 metres (2,300 ft). This body of water has a complex perimeter, being very indented. It has many islands and peninsulas. Lac Moncouche adjoins in particular lakes Doumic, Maingard and Le Marié; this group of lakes feeds the head area of the rivière aux Sables.

The mouth of Lake Moncouche is located at:

- 5.7 kilometres (3.5 mi) South-East of the forest road R0208;
- 11.6 kilometres (7.2 mi) South-East of the Lac Poulin-De Courval dam;
- 75.0 kilometres (46.6 mi) South-East of the mouth of the rivière aux Sables;
- 36.9 kilometres (22.9 mi) North of the Saguenay River;
- 49.7 kilometres (30.9 mi) Southwest of the village center of Saguenay (city);
- 33.8 kilometres (21.0 mi) East of the course of the Shipshaw River

From the mouth of Lake Moncouche, the current flows over 14.3 kilometres (8.9 mi), successively crossing Maingard Lake, le lac Le Marié, Lac des Trois Chutes and Lac Marc before spilling onto the west bank of the rivière aux Sables. From there, the current goes up north for following the course of this last river to "Baie aux Sables", on the south shore of the Pipmuacan Reservoir. From there, the current flows first towards the North to join the current of the Betsiamites River which generally flows towards the South-East to flow on the North-West bank of the Saint Lawrence estuary.

== Toponymy ==
The toponym "Lac Moncouche" appears in the Dictionary of Rivers and Lakes of the Province of Quebec, editions of 1914 and 1925. Le "Petit lac Moncouche" would have been so named a few decades later. In the Innu language and in Cree, muak designates the loon or loon, and Moncouche would be the transcription of the plural form of the term, -É mw¯akouch in Cree.

The toponym "Lac Moncouche" was formalized on December 5, 1968, by the Commission de toponymie du Québec.

== See also ==
- List of lakes of Canada
