= Betsiamites =

Betsiamites may refer to:

- the Betsiamites River in Quebec,
- the Innu community of Betsiamites (also known as Pessamit) on the river.
