= Lac Terant =

Lake in Côte-Nord, Quebec, Canada

- Location within Quebec
- Location: Lac-Walker, Sept-Rivières, Côte-Nord, Québec
- Coordinates: 50°28′35″N 67°44′55″W
- Basin countries: Canada
- Surface elevation: 640–660 metres (2,100–2,170 ft)

Lac Terant is a small lake in the Côte-Nord region of the province of Quebec, Canada. It drains to the west into Lake Sainte-Anne.

== Location ==
Lac Terant is in the unorganized territory of Lac-Walker in the Sept-Rivières Regional County Municipality and Côte-Nord region of Quebec. The lake's name was made official on 20 June 1989. Its origin is not known. A contour map published by the Canadian Ministry of Natural Resources shows that the lake is between 640 and 660 metres (2,100 and 2,170 ft) in elevation, and drains to the west into a nearby lake below 560 metres (1,840 ft). This lake, Lac Godebeuf, in turn drains to the west into the Toulnustouc River, which at this point forms the northern arm of Lake Sainte-Anne.

== Environment ==
A map of the ecological regions of Quebec shows this part of Lake Sainte-Anne and its surroundings is in ecological subregion 6j-S (Hautes collines des lacs Nipissis et Magpie) of the eastern spruce/moss domain of the boreal zone. A map published in 2018 by Sépac of hunting area 17B of the Port-Cartier–Sept-Îles Wildlife Reserve shows the lake just within the southwest corner of the area. According to the map, the land around the lake is forested with timber over thirty years old. Some of the land just downstream towards Lac Godebeuf is regenerating, with trees aged 10 to 30 years.

NASA Earth Observations show that the average annual temperature in the region is −2 °C (28 °F). The warmest month is July, when the average temperature is 14 °C (57 °F), and the coldest is January, with −18 °C (0 °F).

== Sources ==
- Lac Godebeuf, Natural Resources Canada
- Lac Terant (in French), Commission de toponymie du Québec
- Lac Terant, Natural Resources Canada
- NASA Earth Observations Data Set Index, NASA, archived from the original on 2015-03-06
- Réserve faunique de Port-Cartier–Sept-Îles Secteur de chasse no. 17B (PDF) (in French), Sépac
- Saucier, J.-P.; Robitaille, A.; Grondin, P.; Bergeron, J.-F.; Gosselin, J. (2011), Les régions écologiques du Québec méridional (PDF) (map), 4 (in French), Ministère des Ressources naturelles et de la Faune, archived from the original (PDF) on 2020-06-19
