= Bersimis-2 generating station =

Hydroelectric power station in Quebec

- Location within Quebec
- Interactive map of Bersimis-2 generating station
- Location: Lac-au-Brochet, Quebec, Canada
- Coordinates: 49°10′31″N 69°13′45″W
- Construction began: 1956
- Opening date: 1959
- Owner: Hydro-Québec

Dam and spillways
- Type of dam: Gravity dam
- Impounds: Betsiamites River
- Height: 276 ft (84 m)
- Length: 2,100 ft (640 m)
- Width (base): 310 ft (94 m)
- Spillway capacity: 130,000 cu ft/s (3,700 m^{3}/s)

Reservoir
- Surface area: 4,200 ha

Power Station
- Hydraulic head: 380 ft (115.82 m)
- Turbines: 5
- Installed capacity: 869 MW

The Bersimis-2 generating station is a dam and a run-of-the-river hydroelectric power station built by Hydro-Québec on the Betsiamites River, in Lac-au-Brochet, 66 km (41 mi) north of the town of Forestville, Quebec. Construction started in 1956 and the power station was commissioned in 1959 with an initial nameplate capacity of 655 megawatts.

It is the second of two plants built by Hydro-Québec on the Betsiamites. Bersimis-2 was preceded by Bersimis-1, built 30 km (20 mi) upstream between 1953 and 1956. With upgrades and further river diversions, Bersimis-2's installed capacity has been increased over time to its current capacity of 869 megawatts.

== Geography ==
The Betsiamites River, also known as the Bersimis, is located halfway between the Saguenay and Outardes rivers, on the north shore of the Saint Lawrence River, 300 km (190 mi) downstream from Quebec City. With the exception of an Innu reserve at Betsiamites, at the mouth of the river, the area is scarcely populated.

The word Betsiamites or Pessamit is from the innu language and means "the assembly place of the lampreys". Bersimis was not used by either the Innus, the French or the French Canadians, but was introduced by British admiral Henry Wolsey Bayfield, in his hydrographic surveys of the Saint Lawrence River of 1837. The Hudson's Bay Company used the name when opened a trading post in 1855, as did the post office in 1863. After 2 decades of efforts, residents and the Quebec government convinced the federal government to start using Betsiamites in 1919. But administrative use of Bersimis continued for decades and Hydro-Québec used it in the 1950s to name its facility in the area.

Located in the Central Laurentians ecoregion of the Boreal Shield Ecozone, the hinterland is heavily forested and dominated by softwood species: black spruce (Picea mariana), balsam fir (Abies balsamea) and white spruce (Picea glauca). In 1937, the Quebec government granted a forest concession to the Anglo Canadian Pulp & Paper Co. to supply its Forestville mill, on the coast. The area is described as "a sportsman's paradise, where fish, moose, bear and a host of other game creatures abound".

== Background ==
With a continued surge of demand, electricity supplies remained a concern at Hydro-Québec and other Quebec-based utilities in the mid-1950s, but the commissioning of the first 3 units at Bersimis-1 in the last quarter of 1956 somewhat alleviated the problem. Not wanting to get caught in another potential shortage situation, company managers decided to proceed early with two more shovel ready projects: the first one was third and final phase of the Beauharnois generating station, southwest of Montreal which was made possible by the simultaneous construction of the Saint Lawrence Seaway, and Bersimis-2. The decision to build the second plant on the north shore early had the extra benefit of having both labor and equipment in place.

== See also ==
- Bersimis-1 generating station
- History of Hydro-Québec
- List of power stations in Quebec
- List of conventional hydroelectric power stations
