= Nationalization of electricity in Quebec =

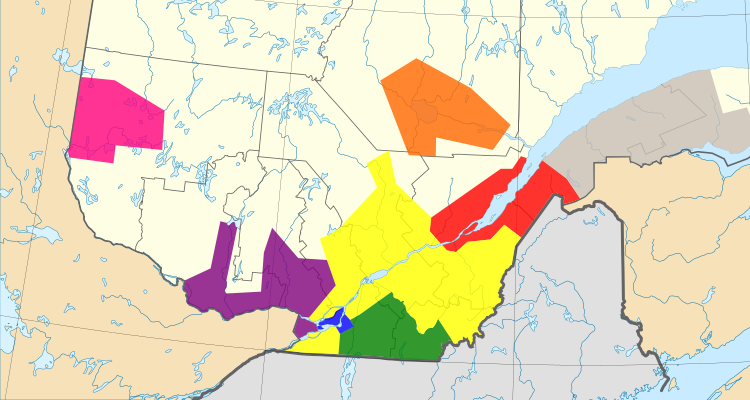
Map of the main electricity companies before nationalization in Quebec.

The nationalization of electricity in Quebec includes two series of events that led to the creation of Hydro-Québec in 1944 and the nationalization of private electricity companies in Quebec in two steps.

In 1944 the first nationalization allowed the province of Quebec to take control of Montreal Light, Heat and Power which had exercised a monopoly on the sale of electricity and gas in the Montreal area. The second phase was initiated by the government of Jean Lesage in 1962 and was linked to the reforms of the Quiet Revolution.

The two nationalizations of electricity allowed Hydro-Quebec to become one of the main producers of electricity in North America, to develop ambitious hydro-electric projects in the North of Quebec and to give Quebec's consumers low and consistent electrical rates.

== See also ==
- History of Hydro-Québec
- Quiet Revolution
- Quebec nationalism
