= Bersimis-1 generating station =

Hydroelectric power station in Quebec

- Location within Quebec
- Interactive map of Bersimis-1 generating station
- Location: Lac-au-Brochet, Quebec, Canada
- Coordinates: 49°17′44.8″N 69°33′2.9″W
- Construction began: 1953
- Opening date: 1956
- Owner: Hydro-Québec

Dam and spillways
- Type of dam: Gravity dam
- Impounds: Betsiamites River
- Height: 61 m (200 ft)
- Length: 670.5 m (2,200 ft)

Reservoir
- Creates: Pipmuacan Reservoir
- Total capacity: 13,900 million m^{3}
- Surface area: 79,800 ha

Power Station
- Turbines: 8
- Installed capacity: 1,178 MW

The Bersimis-1 generating station is a dam and a hydroelectric power station built by Hydro-Québec in conjunction with Perini, Atlas and Cartier construction companies on the Betsiamites River, in Lac-au-Brochet, 85 km (53 mi) north of the town of Forestville, Quebec. Construction started in 1953 and the power station was commissioned in 1956 with an initial nameplate capacity of 912 megawatts.

It is the first plant ever built by Hydro-Québec and it has been described as a turning point in the history of electricity in province, paving the way for the takeover of all private utilities by the government-owned corporation in 1963. Three years later, the first plant was followed by a second one, built 30 km (20 mi) downstream. Bersimis-2 entered service in 1959.

With upgrades, a major overhaul in the 1990s and further river diversions, Bersimis-1 installed capacity has been increased over time to its current 1,178 megawatts.

== Geography ==
The Betsiamites River, also known as the Bersimis, is located halfway between the Saguenay and Outardes rivers, on the north shore of the Saint Lawrence River, 300 km (190 mi) downstream from Quebec City. With the exception of an Innu reserve at Betsiamites, at the mouth of the river, the area is scarcely populated.

The word Betsiamites or Pessamit is from the innu language and means "the assembly place of the lampreys". Bersimis was not used by either the Innus, the French or the French Canadians, but was introduced by British admiral Henry Wolsey Bayfield, in his hydrographic surveys of the Saint Lawrence River of 1837. The Hudson's Bay Company used the name when opened a trading post in 1855, as did the post office in 1863. After 2 decades of efforts, residents and the Quebec government convinced the federal government to start using Betsiamites in 1919. But administrative use of Bersimis perdured for decades and Hydro-Québec used it in the 1950s to name its facility in the area.

Located in the Central Laurentians ecoregion of the Boreal Shield Ecozone, the hinterland is heavily forested and dominated by softwood species: black spruce (Picea mariana), balsam fir (Abies balsamea) and white spruce (Picea glauca). In 1937, the Quebec government granted a forest concession to the Anglo Canadian Pulp & Paper Co. to supply its Forestville mill, on the coast. The area is described as "a sportsman's paradise, where fish, moose, bear and a host of other game creatures abound".

The river is well suited for hydroelectric development. The river falls 373 m (1,224 ft) over 160 km (100 mi), between Lake Pipmuacan, and the delta, including an initial drop of 213 m (700 ft) on the first 30 km (20 mi). The site was also ideal because the river flow could be controlled very easily at the outlet of Lac Cassé. More development was also possible at a second location, approximately 30 km (20 mi) downstream, to capitalize from a further 113 m (370 ft) drop. The second site was developed between 1956 and 1959 and came to be known as Bersimis-2.

== Background ==
The post-war boom in Quebec created an unprecedent increase in electricity demand in Quebec. Planners, at Hydro-Québec and other public utilities serving the province, were kept busy looking for ways to increase supply. In the Montreal area, the addition of 12 more units at the Beauharnois generating station would not be sufficient to meet the steady increase in demand as early as 1956.

Quebec's largest private utility faced the same problem. Although the Shawinigan Water & Power Company (SWP) added units at its Rapide-Blanc and La Tuque facilities while building the brand new 184-MW Shawinigan-3 (1949) and the 300-MW Trenche generating station in 1953, company executives were eager to increase capacity by getting the government to award new hydraulic concessions on undeveloped rivers.

SWP sets its sight on the promising rivers in northeastern Quebec. In 1948, its engineering subsidiary, Shawinigan Engineering, surveyed the North Shore rivers and started planning for the construction of a 1,000,000 horsepower (746 MW) generating station on the Betsiamites River, 300 kilometres (186 mi) downstream of Quebec City. The drainage was easily regulated from its source, Lac Cassé, and according to preliminary calculations, developing the remote site would cost $125 per horsepower, a cost low enough to offset the cost of 650-kilometre (400 mi) power lines to bring the power to Quebec's largest cities.

But the Quebec government decided otherwise. The hydraulic concession was granted instead to government-owned Hydro-Québec in September 1951. According to Claude Bellavance, an economic historian who wrote a comprehensive book on the rise and fall of SWP, this decision by the Maurice Duplessis government had major consequences on the future of the company, which was bought and merged by Hydro-Québec in 1963. In hindsight, writes Bellavance, this move represented a major step towards the re-appropriation of this economic sector by the State, making Hydro-Québec the main if not the sole entity in charge of hydroelectric development in the province.

== Construction ==
Preliminary work began in June 1953. The first step involved building infrastructures to deliver 500,000 tons of equipment, food and supplies to the 5,000 workers on site, including a wharf and a warehouse in Forestville and 230 km (140 mi) of roadwork in the hinterland. Everything, from sundries to cement, was shipped to Forestville, then unloaded at the Hydro-Québec wharf in Forestville and loaded into trucks for the trek to the interior. The 2-lane road from Forestville to Labrieville is now part of the Quebec highway network and is now known as Route 385.

=== Labrieville ===
But even before starting work on the dam and power station, a stable supply of electricity was required. Hydro-Québec built a temporary hydroelectric plant at nearby Lac Cassé between November 1952 and July 1953. The 15,000-horsepower (12 MW) hydroelectric generating station supplied the construction sites and camps. The equipment used for the temporary plant came from the Saint-Timothée generating station, a small hydro plant in the Montreal area dismantled by Hydro-Québec in 1949.

Construction of Labrieville, a village named in honor of Napoléon-Alexandre Labrie, founding bishop of the Gulf of St. Lawrence Roman Catholic Diocese, began in June 1953. Besides temporary quarters for workers, an 8-classroom school, a 400-seat church, inn, an administrative and commercial center and 117 homes were built. The first tenant took possession of a dwelling on November 16, 1953, and the village was completed in 1955.

Described as a "jewel set in the ruggedness of wild country", the village was located in the Betsiamite River valley a short distance from the generating station. Improvements in telecommunications and remote-controlled operations made it redundant, and the company chose to close Labrieville in 1974.

=== Dam ===
The actual construction of the dams and power plant kicked off in October 1953. Two rock-filled structures were built to create the 750 km^{2} (290 sq mi) Pipmuacan Reservoir, increasing the surfaces of lakes Pipmuacan and Cassé: the first, 674 m (2,211 ft) long and 74 m (243 ft) high, is built between two mountains surrounding the Lac Cassé, the second, 315 m (1,033 ft) long, curtailed the release of water into the Desroches River.

Vast quantities of clay was required to make the impervious cores of the rock-filled dams. A sufficient quantity was found nearby by surveyors with the assistance of native guides, who recalled seeing beavers fetching the material for their own dams.

A mountain between the two dams was cut down to build a spillway for the reservoir. Both dams are similar in conception to the Kenney Dam built in 1952 by Alcan as part of their Kemano, British Columbia generating station.

=== Generating station ===
The underground powerhouse is located 12 km (7.5 mi) from the dam. A 31-foot (9.4 m) diameter, concrete-lined water intake was dug in the Laurentian Plateau granite to bring water to a manifold, where individual penstocks feed the plant's 8 units. Work on the tunnel was carried out at an average speed of 732 ft (223 m) per week.

The surge tank has been carved from rock and is located 60 ft (18 m) from the first penstock. A 27 ft (8.2 m) shaft rises vertically 313 ft (95 m), connects to the bottom of the surge tank, 84 ft (26 m) in diameter and 360 ft (110 m) deep, and opens on to a hilltop overlooking the village.

The powerhouse was carved inside the mountain and is accessed through a 270 ft (82 m) tunnel. Inside the 365-foot (111 m) long, 65-foot (20 m) high and 80-foot (24 m) wide cavity were installed eight 150,000-horsepower Francis turbines, connected to 13.8 kilovolt generators. Parallel to the powerhouse, a tailrace tunnel discharges the water to the river channel below.

=== Power lines ===
Construction of the 2 double-circuit high voltage overhead power lines built to carry power to Quebec City and Montreal attracted considerable interest in the engineering trade press and contributed to raise the profile of Hydro-Québec's engineers internationally. From the power station, the 315-kilovolt (kV) power lines, among the first to be built in North America at this voltage, follow a westerly direction to reach the Sault-aux-Cochons River, where they turn south following the valley. Near the mouth of the river, the line takes a south-westerly orientation, parallel to the Saint Lawrence River and crosses the Saguenay River fjord near Petit-Saguenay. Two sets of crossing pylons, separated by a span width of 1.6 km (1 mi) were built on each side of river in order not to interfere with shipping.

A third 315 kV power line to Baie-Comeau was built to bring power to the Gaspé Peninsula, via 4-55 km (34 mi) submarine power cables, linking the Manicouagan peninsula to the Les Boules substation in Métis-sur-Mer. Laying the cables at a depth of 370 m (1,210 ft) proved difficult, due to high winds and heavy waves, damaging two cables. A first attempt to power the cables was made in December 1954, but they became operational in November 1955, almost a year later. Starting in 1959, corrosion and the action of ice caused repeated failures leading to its decommissioning in 1962.

=== Working conditions ===
Allegation of mistreatment of workers on the worksite stirred controversy in early 1954. Reporter Pierre Laporte published a six-part series in Montreal's Le Devoir on the construction of Bersimis-1 in January 1954. In his stories, Laporte reports on the long hours, bad pay and unhealthy working conditions, mismanagement and shady contracting practices. The stories, published a few days after 10 men died in a scaffolding collapse on January 22, 1954, generated heated debates at the Legislature. Inspired by Laporte's reporting, Liberal opposition leader Georges-Émile Lapalme accused the Maurice Duplessis government of mismanagement.

In a history M.A. thesis submitted in 2009, Richard Landry concluded that pay and working conditions onsite were comparable or even better than what was afforded to the average Canadian worker at the time, while stressing the 1954 accident incited Hydro-Québec to implement health and safety measures geared towards prevention.

== Operations and maintenance ==
=== Manouane River diversion ===
In 1994, Hydro-Québec undertook the refit of the power station's 8 units. The project was completed in 2003.

It was followed in 2003 by the partial diversion of the Manouane River in order to increase the flow by 30.8 m^{3}/s and the annual production of the Bersimis power stations by 378 gigawatt-hours. The $50 million project involved building a roller-compacted concrete dam 9 m (30 ft) high and a 90 m (300 ft) long, a spillway, three dikes and a diversion channel.

The project was highly controversial and the Bureau d'audiences publiques sur l'environnement (BAPE), who conducted public hearings in 2001, judged the project "unacceptable" due to the impacts reduced flows would have on the atlantic salmon and on various recreational and economic uses of the river. However, the BAPE report was dismissed by Environment minister André Boisclair, who authorized the project in October 2002.

=== Intake tunnel ===
Inspections of the 12 km (7.5 mi) intake tunnel in 1979, 1981 and 1983 showed that its walls were covered by a 5 mm (0.20 in) layer of a black sticky slime, decreasing the capacity of the generating station by approximately 39 MW. Between 1993 and 1995, various methods were tested to clean the surface and apply different coating products to limit the slime deposit.

In the fall of 2007, Hydro-Québec announced it was studying the possibility of digging a second tunnel between the Pipmuacan Reservoir and the generating station, because the original tunnel is partially obstructed by silt. The $200 million project was indefinitely postponed early in 2009 after the company conducted a cost-benefit analysis.

== See also ==
- List of largest power stations in Canada
- Bersimis-2 generating station
- History of Hydro-Québec
- List of power stations in Quebec
- List of conventional hydroelectric power stations
