= Toulnustouc generating station =

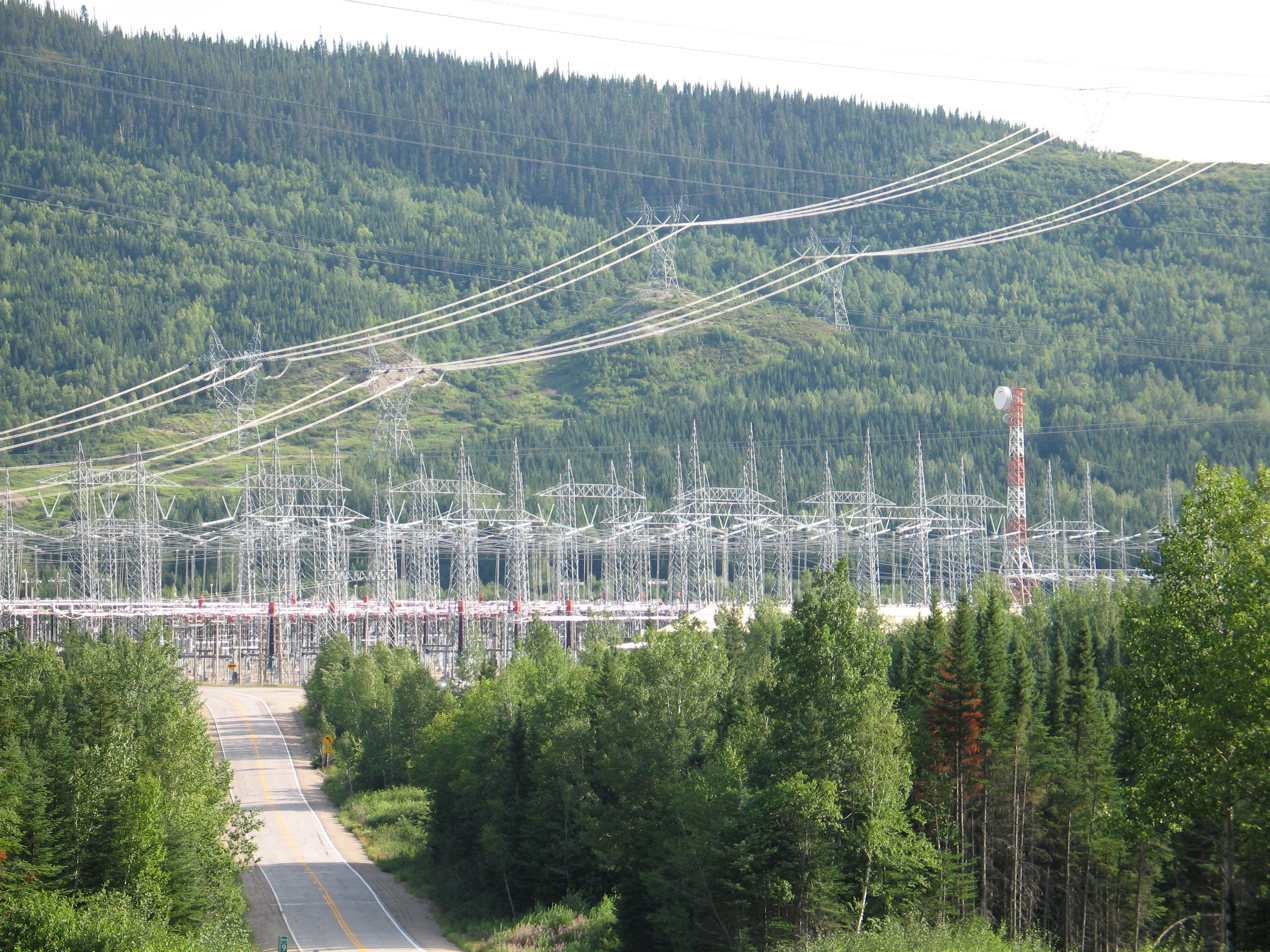

- Location within Quebec
- Official name: Centrale de Toulnustouc
- Location: Rivière-aux-Outardes, Manicouagan RCM; Quebec; Canada
- Coordinates: 49.970493°N 68.158973°W
- Status: Operational
- Opening date: 2005
- Owner: Hydro-Québec

Dam and spillways
- Type of dam: Rock-fill dam
- Impounds: Toulnustouc River
- Height: 70 metres (230 ft)
- Length: 500 metres (1,600 ft)

Power Station
- Commission date: 18 August 2005
- Hydraulic head: 152 metres (499 ft)
- Turbines: 2 Francis vertical
- Installed capacity: 526 MW
- Annual generation: 2,660 GW/h

The Toulnustouc generating station (French: Centrale de Toulnustouc), is a hydroelectric power generating station managed by Hydro-Québec on the Toulnustouc River in the territory of Côte-Nord, Quebec, Canada. It has an installed capacity of 526 MW. The power station is fed by water from a dam and dyke that contain the Lake-Sainte-Anne reservoir.

== Project ==
A dam and dyke were built to enlarge the existing 213 square kilometres (82 sq mi) Lake-Sainte-Anne reservoir for the use by the Toulnustouc hydroelectric project. RSW of Montreal was selected as the prime consulting engineers. VINCI Construction Grands Projets undertook construction. The new dam and dyke are about 14 kilometres (8.7 mi) downstream of the former Lac-Sainte-Anne dam, and added 22 square kilometres (8.5 sq mi) to the reservoir. The development was carried out in partnership with the Pessamit Council and the Manicouagan Regional County Municipality.

Work started in November 2001, and for the next four years the project employed 425 people on average, peaking at 1,200 workers in the summer of 2003. The average worker was aged over 50. Total cost was over CDN$800 million. The reservoir started to fill on 10 February 2005 and reached its maximum operating level on 29 April 2005. The plant entered service four months ahead of schedule on 1 July 2005. The Toulnustouc hydroelectric plant was officially inaugurated on 18 August 2005 by Quebec Premier Jean Charest and Thierry Vandal, CEO of Hydro-Québec.

== Dam ==
The dam is 76 metres (249 ft) high, with an effective height of 72.3 metres (237 ft) and length of 570 metres (1,870 ft). A spillway with a capacity of 2,400 cubic metres per second (85,000 cu ft/s) is used to release excess inflow and to maintain a flow of at least 3 cubic metres per second (110 cu ft/s) in the river downstream from the dam. The dam structure is concrete face rockfill using materials from the spillway excavations, with impermeability provided by the concrete face slab. This was an innovative choice for the Nordic environment with its large temperature variations and ice loads in winter. Submersible tiltmeters were installed along two cross-sectional lines on the dam and the south dike to measure slab deflection so that Hydro-Québec could confirm that any structural movement was within the acceptable range. Leakage is very low, at around 10–15 litres per second (0.35–0.53 cu ft/s).

== Dyke and supply tunnel ==
The south dyke is in a valley about 500 metres (1,600 ft) southwest of the main dam, and holds back the reservoir in that area. The dyke is 45 metres (148 ft) high. A tunnel from the end of the south dyke carries water to the hydroelectric plant, which is just below PK55 on the river. The supply tunnel is 9.8 kilometres (6.1 mi) long.

== Plant ==
The Toulnustouc generating station is on the Toulnustouc River in the Manicouagan watershed. It has an installed capacity of 526 MW from two generating units. The hydraulic head is 152 metres (499 ft). The plant produces 2,660 GW/h annually.

The discharge channel to the river is 1.2 kilometres (0.75 mi) long, and required excavation of 93,000 cubic metres (3,300,000 cu ft) of overburden and 67,000 cubic metres (2,400,000 cu ft) of rock. A geomembrane covered by 35,000 cubic metres (1,200,000 cu ft) of stone stabilizes the slopes and bottom of the discharge channel.

== Sources ==
- Aménagement hydroélectrique de la Toulnustouc, Hydro-Québec, May 2006
- Holzhausen, Gary R; Thivierge, Stéphane-Éric (17 May 2005), "Monitoring movements at Toulnustouc", Water Power
- Hydroelectric Generating Stations as at January 1st, 2019, Hydro-Québec
- La centrale de Toulnustouc inaugurée (in French), Radio-Canada, 18 August 2005
- Rapport d'analyse environnementale, Projet d'aménagement hydroélectrique de la rivière Toulnustouc (PDF) (in French), Gouvernement du Québec, 18 June 2001
- "En bref - La centrale de Toulnustouc voit le jour", Le Devoir (in French), 18 August 2005
- Toulnustouc, Barrage de la, Gouvernement du Québec, 2019
- "Toulnustouc Dam", Canadian Consulting Engineer, 1 October 2006
- Toulnustouc hydroelectric power project, VINCI Construction Grands Projets
