= Manouane River (Péribonka River tributary) =

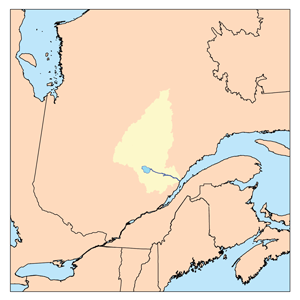

Location
- Country: Canada
- Province: Quebec
- Region: Saguenay–Lac-Saint-Jean
- Regional County Municipality: Le Fjord-du-Saguenay Regional County Municipality
- Unorganized Territory: Mont-Valin, Quebec

Physical characteristics
- Source: Manouane Lake
  - location: Saguenay–Lac-Saint-Jean
  - coordinates: 51°41′53″N 70°44′41″W
  - elevation: 510 m (1,670 ft)
- Mouth: Peribonka River
  - location: Mont-Valin, Quebec Unorganized territory
  - coordinates: 49°30′21″N 71°10′32″W
  - elevation: 180 m (590 ft)
- Length: 209 km (130 mi)

Basin features
- Tributaries
  - left: (upstream from the mouth) Ruisseau des Cascades, creek Bezeau, ruisseau du Lièvre, Manouaniche River, creek Omer, rivière à Georges, outlet of lakes Micheline and Reine, rivière du Castor-Qui-Cale, creek Guy, outlet of lake Potamot, outlet of lake Flamboyant and lake de la Tourterelle Triste, outlet of lac du Ciel, outlet of lac de Jade, Naja River, creek Orvet, outlet of lac du Grand Nénuphar, outlet of a set of lakes such lake à Paul, lake de la Montagne and lake de la Griffe, outlet of lac du Portage and lake Suzanne, creek Rond, rivière du Grand Détour, ruisseau aux Outardes, outlet of lake Rêveur, outlet of lake Cynthia and lake Joël, creek Baby.
  - right: (upstream, from the mouth) Rivière du Portage (Manouane River), Alma River (Manouane River), creek Lalé, outlet of Lake à la Pêche, Houlière River, Petite rivière Manouane, outlet of Lake de la Maison Blanche, creek Milot, outlet of lakes Panache, des Trois Verneux and de la Radio.

The Manouane River, a tributary of the Peribonka River, flows in unorganized territory of Mont-Valin, Quebec, in the administrative region of Saguenay-Lac-Saint-Jean, in Quebec, Canada.

Forestry is the main economic activity of this valley; recreational tourism activities, second; hydroelectricity, third.

Forest Roads R0258 (North-South) and R0251 serve the Manouane River Valley, the Georges River and the Manouaniche River.

The surface of the Péribonka River is usually frozen from late November to early April, however, safe ice movement is generally from mid-December to late March.

== Geography ==
The Manouane Lake (length: 54 kilometres (34 mi); width: 33 kilometres (21 mi); altitude: 510 metres (1,670 ft) area: 461 square kilometres (178 sq mi)) is the headwater body of the Manouane River.

From the dam at the mouth of Manouane Lake, the Manouane River flows on 209.0 kilometres (129.9 mi) entirely in forest areas, according to the following segments :

Upper Manouane River course (segment of 145.3 kilometres (90.3 mi))

- 7.8 kilometres (4.8 mi) easterly forming a hook to the north crossing Lake Opitoune (length: 12.7 kilometres (7.9 mi); altitude: 589 metres (1,932 ft));
- 7.5 kilometres (4.7 mi) southerly crossing Lake Opitounis (length: 4.8 kilometres (3.0 mi); altitude: 521 metres (1,709 ft));
- 13.8 kilometres (8.6 mi) southerly forming a hook to the northeast and crossing Otapoco Lake (length: 4.8 kilometres (3.0 mi); altitude: 486 metres (1,594 ft));
- 17.3 kilometres (10.7 mi) southwesterly through Lake Shortcut (length: 4.0 kilometres (2.5 mi); altitude: 491 metres (1,611 ft));
- 47.7 kilometres (29.6 mi) to the southwest, then to the south, collecting the outlet of Lake Panache and Lake Radio, as well as curving towards the east at the end of the segment, until "Rivière aux Outardes" (coming from the East);
- 20.3 kilometres (12.6 mi) south to the outlet of Lake Grand Détour (coming from the North-East);
- 5.0 kilometres (3.1 mi) southwesterly to a bend in the river corresponding to the outlet of Portage Lake and Suzanne Lake;
- 25.9 kilometres (16.1 mi) to the NW by cutting off the R0251 forest road by collecting the Naja River (coming from the South and draining the Paul Lake) and the landfill (coming from South) of Lake Grand Nénuphar, as well as the creek Milot (coming from the North), until the confluence of the Little Manouane River (coming from the North);

Lower Manouane River course (segment of 63.7 kilometres (39.6 mi))

- 25.0 kilometres (15.5 mi) to the South, crossing in particular Lac Duhamel (length: 5.0 kilometres (3.1 mi); altitude: 254 metres (833 ft)), to the confluence of the Castor-Qui-Cale River (coming from the North-East);
- 2.6 kilometres (1.6 mi) south, to the confluence of the Houlière River (coming from the northwest);
- 4.0 kilometres (2.5 mi) south, to the confluence of the George River (coming from the East);
- 11.6 kilometres (7.2 mi) southerly to the confluence of the Alma River (from the Northwest);
- 2.9 kilometres (1.8 mi) south, to the confluence of the Manouaniche River (coming from the South-East);
- 17.6 kilometres (10.9 mi) southwesterly to the mouth of the river.

The mouth of the Manouane River flows on the east bank of the Péribonka River, that is to say:

- 18.6 kilometres (11.6 mi) west of the Pipmuacan Reservoir;
- 20.1 kilometres (12.5 mi) north-west of the dam at the mouth of Lake Pamouscachiou;
- 55.8 kilometres (34.7 mi) south-east of the dam at the mouth of Lake Péribonka which is crossed by the Péribonka River;
- 108.3 kilometres (67.3 mi) north of the mouth of the Péribonka River (confluence with lac Saint-Jean;
- 108.9 kilometres (67.7 mi) north of the mouth of lac Saint-Jean.

From the mouth of the Manouane River, the current flows down 143.3 kilometres (89.0 mi) south to the Péribonka River, crosses lac Saint-Jean towards the East on 29.3 kilometres (18.2 mi), then take the course of the Saguenay River on the East side to Tadoussac on 155 kilometres (96 mi) where it meets with the St. Lawrence River.

== Toponymy ==
The toponym "Manouan" is indicated on a map of 1705. This toponymic designation was inscribed in 1945 and approved on November 4, 1948. This place name has known several spellings: Manuan, Manowan, Manouan. This name is from Montagnais source, Manauan Shakaikan meaning "lake where we collect eggs". This designation turns out to be a derivative of manneu, meaning "he removes it by hand", from uau, egg, and shakaikan, lake. It would be a custom for the Montagnais to collect the eggs of birds in the islands and on the shores of this lake.

The toponym "Rivière Manouane" was inscribed on December 5, 1968, at the Bank of Place Names of the Commission de toponymie du Québec.

== See also ==
- List of longest rivers of Canada
- List of Quebec rivers
- List of National Parks of Canada
- Le Fjord-du-Saguenay Regional County Municipality (RCM)
- Mont-Valin, Quebec, an unorganized territory
- Péribonka River
