= Lake Péribonka =

Lake in Quebec, Canada

- Location within Quebec
- Location: Mont-Valin, Le Fjord-du-Saguenay Regional County Municipality, Quebec
- Coordinates: 50°06′56″N 71°14′57″W
- Primary inflows: Péribonka River
- Primary outflows: Péribonka River
- Basin countries: Canada
- Max. length: 59 kilometres (37 mi)
- Max. width: 11 kilometres (6.8 mi)
- Surface area: 264 kilometres (164 mi)
- Surface elevation: 435 metres (1,427 ft)

Lake Péribonka is a freshwater body of the unorganized territory of Mont-Valin, Quebec, in Le Fjord-du-Saguenay Regional County Municipality, in the administrative region of Saguenay-Lac-Saint-Jean, in Quebec, Canada.

By the middle of the 19th century, forestry was the predominant economic activity of the sector. This large body of water is generally frozen from mid-November to the end of April; however, the period of safe ice traffic is usually from mid-December to the end of March.

== Geography ==
Lake Péribonka is located about 140 kilometres (87 mi) northeast of Lac Saint-Jean. It constitutes an important outgrowth of the river of the same name. 59 kilometres (37 mi) (north-south) and 11 kilometres (6.8 mi) wide, lake Péribonka covers an area of 264 square kilometres (102 sq mi).

The main hydrographic slopes near Péribonka Lake are:

- west side: Serpent River, Brodeuse River, Épinette Rouge River, Mistassibi River Northeast; the lakes Maupertuis and Piraube;
- east side: Carp River, Cocoumenen River, Blaireau Creek and Cigale Creek, Little Shipshaw River, Manouane River. Note: the Pipmuacan Reservoir is located east of the Manouane River.

The Péribonka River arrives from the north by collecting the waters of Cocoumenen and Saint-Onge. It then crosses the Onistagane Lake Proposed Biodiversity Reserve. Lake Péribonka receives the waters of the Épinette Rouge River (West side) and the rivière à la Carpe (East side). Lake Péribonka has several dozen islands, peninsulas and bays.

During World War II, the Alcan company developed a hydroelectric plant on the Péribonka River to increase its electric power for aluminum production in Saguenay. Between 1941 and 1943, a dam was erected upstream of the "Passes Dangereuses", located about 15 kilometres (9.3 mi) downstream (south) of Péribonka Lake. Thus, the area of Lake Péribonka has increased significantly. This hydroelectric infrastructure is located at the southern end of this reservoir.

== Toponymy ==
Formerly, this body of water was designated "Manouan" in native language, meaning "where we collect eggs". In 1926, because of a toponymic redundancy relative to two "Manouan Lake" (including another lake 40 kilometres (25 mi) northeast), this body of water is renamed "Lake Péribonka" by the Commission de géographie du Québec, thus adopting the name of the river of the same name. In 1987, all similar toponyms are replaced by the officialized place name. The Montagnais have also used the name "Unistakan Shakikan", meaning "lake where we get up with load on the back".

The toponym "Lake Péribonka" was formalized on December 18, 1986 at the Bank of Place Names of the Commission de toponymie du Québec.

== See also ==
- Lac Saint-Jean
- Saguenay River
