= Lake Sainte-Anne (Toulnustouc) =

Body of water in Quebec, Canada

- Lac Sainte-Anne (French)
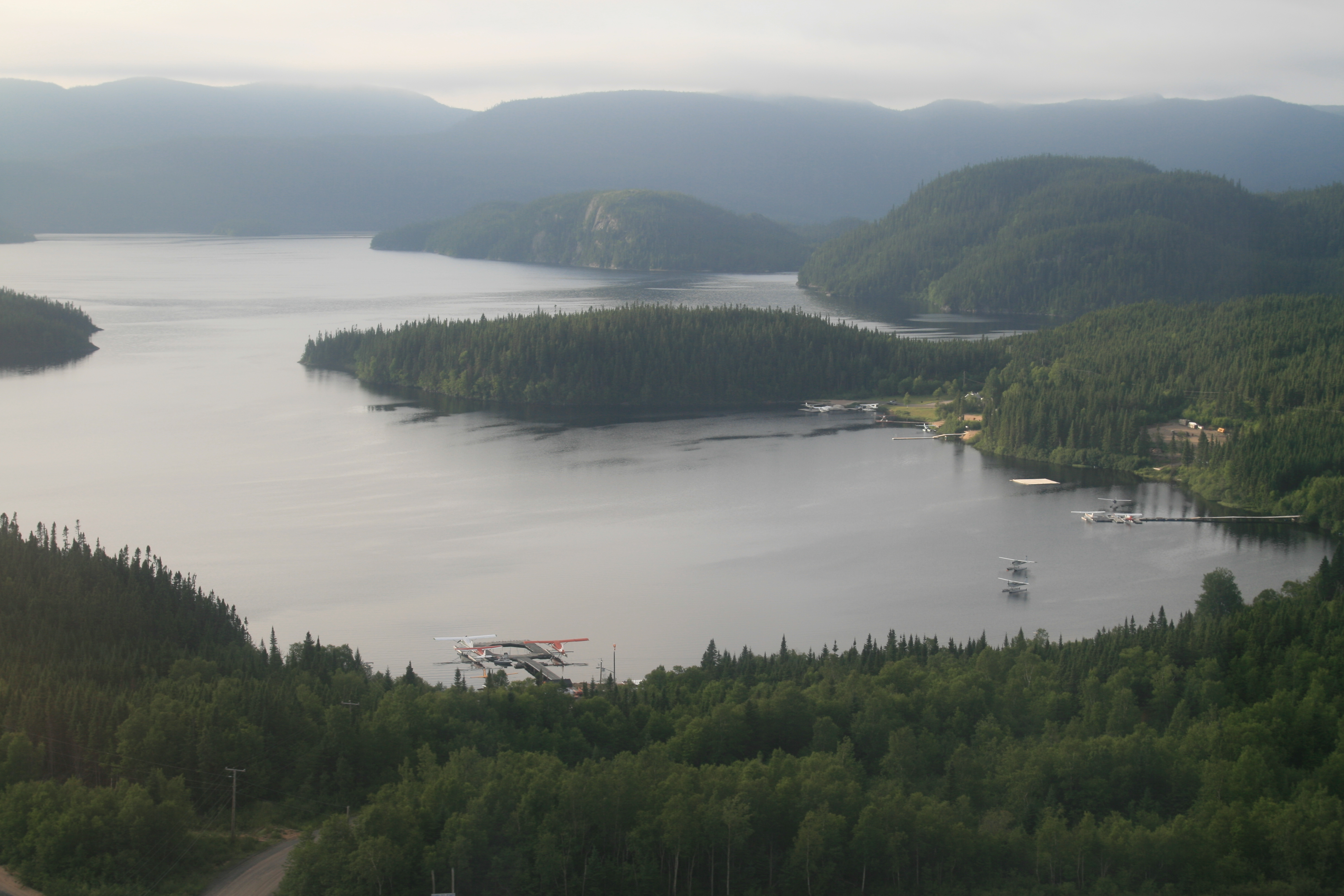
- Kami Property on the lake, with airplanes

- Location within Quebec
- Coordinates: 50.151202°N 67.909072°W
- River sources: Toulnustouc River
- Basin countries: Canada
- First flooded: 1950 / 2005
- Surface area: 23,400 hectares (58,000 acres)
- Surface elevation: 301.74 metres (990.0 ft)
- References: EHZEL

Lake Sainte-Anne (French: Lac Sainte-Anne) is a lake and reservoir on the Toulnustouc River in the territory of Côte-Nord, Quebec, Canada. The original dam was built in 1950 to regulate the river flow as part of the Manicouagan River hydroelectric power complex. A new dam was completed in 2005 that enlarged the reservoir and supported the new Toulnustouc generating station.

== First dam ==
The Lac-Sainte-Anne Reservoir was created when the Sainte-Anne Dam (French: Barrage Sainte-Anne) at 50.102601°N 67.945622°W was filled in 1957. Its purpose was to regulate the flow of water in the Toulnustouc River that powers the downstream Manic-2, Manic-1 and older McCormick hydroelectric plants. It covered an area of 213 square kilometres (82 sq mi). Manic-1 and Manic-2 are owned by Hydro-Québec and McCormick by the Manicouagan Hydroelectric Company. The Manic 2 generating station was built near Baie-Comeau where the Manicouagan River meets the Saint Lawrence River.

Before the new dam was built, Lake Sainte-Anne reached its maximum level of 301.75 metres (990.0 ft) in spring, and remained this size during summer. It then shrank down to a minimum level of 275.84 metres (905.0 ft) by the start of May. There is also a dyke in the southeast of the lake. This was repaired to reduce leakage as part of the new dam project.

== Second dam ==
A new dam and dyke were built for the Toulnustouc hydroelectric project to enlarge the existing Lac-Sainte-Anne reservoir. The old dam was above PK80 on the river, while the new dam was between PK65 and PK70. The new dam is 76 metres (249 ft) high, with an effective height of 72.3 metres (237 ft) and length of 570 metres (1,870 ft). The reservoir now has storage capacity of 2,798,000,000 cubic metres (9.88×10^{10} cu ft). The reservoir area is now 23,400 hectares (58,000 acres), and the watershed area is 7,863 square kilometres (3,036 sq mi).

The new dam and dyke are about 14 kilometres (8.7 mi) downstream of the former Lac-Sainte-Anne dam. The south dyke is in a valley about 500 metres (1,600 ft) south of the main dam, and contains the reservoir in that area. A tunnel was built from the end of the south dyke to carry water to the hydroelectric plant, which is just below PK55 on the river. The old dam was destroyed after the new dam was closed.

== Impact of second dam ==
With the new dam the maximum level remained unchanged at 301.75 metres (990.0 ft) but the minimum was raised to 290 metres (950 ft). The new part of Lake Sainte Anne began to fill on 10 February 2005, and in five days the level had risen by 57 metres (187 ft) and the new section was in equilibrium with the existing lake at a surface elevation of 289 metres (948 ft) above sea level. After that filling continued more slowly, on average by 1–2 centimetres (0.39–0.79 in) per day. By the start of summer 2005 the lake had risen to its maximum operating level of 301.74 metres (990.0 ft) above sea level, the same as the existing lake. The lake has expanded by about 18 square kilometres (6.9 sq mi) to rather more than 230 square kilometres (89 sq mi).

The flooding only affected the wintering area of one moose, which moved to a new location. Smaller mammals such as hare, porcupine, squirrel, marten, otter and beaver moved about normally to avoid the rising water and found refuge in the forest around the edge of the reservoir. Predators such as wolf, fox and lynx patrolled the waterline in search of prey. The overall impact on wildlife seems to have been minor.

Flow between the dam and spillway was cut off for five days, then resumed at a reduced rate of 3 cubic metres per second (110 cu ft/s) in this section. Observations in the summer of 2005 showed there had been no significant impact on fish densities in the reduced flow area. In the new part of the lake there is a deficit of oxygen at deeper levels and there is higher phosphorus content at al levels. These phenomena are due to decomposition of vegetation that had not been cleared before flooding, and were not expected to last more than a few years. Measures in the summer of 2005 showed that fish were quickly populating the new part of the lake. Fish samples were made in 2005, 2007 and 2009, with notes of the length, weight, possible abnormalities and parasites, particularly brook trout. The results showed that the numbers and size of the fish in the river and the reservoir had not been affected, and if anything the fish were larger.

== Sources ==
- Aménagement hydroélectrique de la Toulnustouc, Hydro-Québec, May 2006
- Aménagement hydroélectrique de la Toulnustouc proposé par Hydro-québec (PDF) (Rapport d’étude approfondie) (in French), Ministère des Pêches et des Océans du Canada, Région Laurentienne, September 2001
- De bonnes nouvelles de la Toulnustouc! (PDF) (in French), Hydro-Québec
- Rapport d'analyse environnementale, Projet d'aménagement hydroélectrique de la rivière Toulnustouc (PDF) (in French), Gouvernement du Québec, 18 June 2001
- Simeons, Charles (24 April 2014), Hydro-Power: The Use of Water as an Alternative Source of Energy, Elsevier Science, ISBN 978-1-4831-4561-7
- Toulnustouc, Barrage de la, Gouvernement du Québec, 2019
- "Toulnustouc Dam", Canadian Consulting Engineer, 1 October 2006
