= Gatineau Power Company =

Canadian electricity company

- Founder: Canadian International Paper Company

Gatineau Power Company was an electricity generation and distribution company in Quebec, Canada.

It was originally a subsidiary of Canadian Pacific and later of International Paper. Its operations included a streetcar company which served Hull, Quebec.

The company disappeared as a separate organization after it and other investor-owned electric companies were acquired by Hydro-Québec as part of the nationalization of electricity in Quebec in 1963.

== See also ==
- History of Hydro-Québec

== Sources ==
- Gatineau Power Company. Un quart de siècle de progrès et de service./ 1951? 16 p.; 29 cm.
- Gatineau Power Company. Trente-cinq ans de progrès et de service. 1961? 16 p.; 28 cm
