= Pessamit Innu Band =

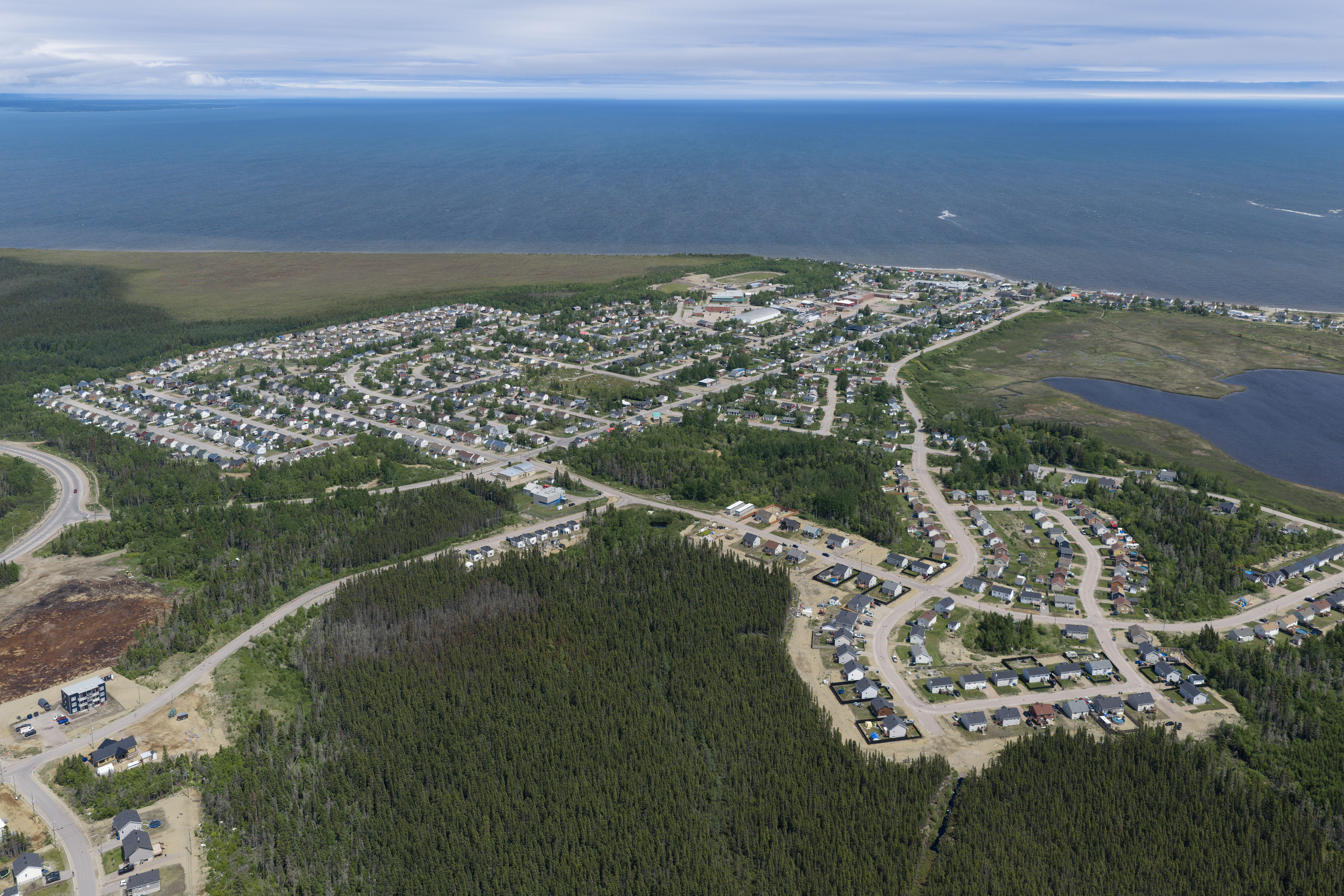
Pessamit Indian reserve in 2026

The Pessamit Innu Band, which the official name is bande des Innus de Pessamit, is an Indian band of the Innu First Nations in Quebec, Canada. Its members primarily live on the Indian reserve of Pessamit in the Côte-Nord, the north shore of Saint Lawrence River, which is also the seat of the band. In 2017 it has a registered population of 3,953 members. It is governened by a band council called Conseil des Innus de Pessamit and it is affiliated with the Mamuitun Tribal Council. The band was previously known as Bersimis and Betsiamites.

== Geography ==
The Pessamit Innu Band owns only one Indian reserve, Pessamit, previously known as "Betsiamites", where lives the majority of its members, located in the Côte-Nord, the north shore of Saint Lawrence River, in Quebec at approximately 40 km southeast of Baie-Comeau. The reserve covers an area of 25,242 hectares. Baie-Comeau is the closest service centre and the closest big city is Quebec City.

== History ==
The ancestors of the Innu people are present on the north shore of Saint Lawrence River since at least 5500 B.C. In 1534 Jacques Cartier met a nation that he called "Papinachois" in the region of Tadoussac. It was in fact the ancestors of the Innus who were later called "Montagnais" by the French settlers. From 1632 to 1782 many Jesuit missionaries evangelized the Innus. In fact in 1849 the Innus of Pessamit built a chapel on the site of the actual village of Pessamit. In 1851 the Catholic father Arnaud sent a request to the Government of Canada to reserve a territory of 70,000 acres west of the Rivière aux Outardes for the Indigenous peoples. This request was granted the following year. The Indian reserve of Pessamit was created in 1862. The band was then known as "Bersimis". In 1901 the Sœurs du Bon-Conseil coming from Chicoutimi started to give education on the reserve. The Conseil des Innus de Pessamit took the responsibility for the education in 1979. In 1981 the band changed its name for "Betsiamites". In 2001 it changed its name to its actual name of "Pessamit".

== Demographics ==
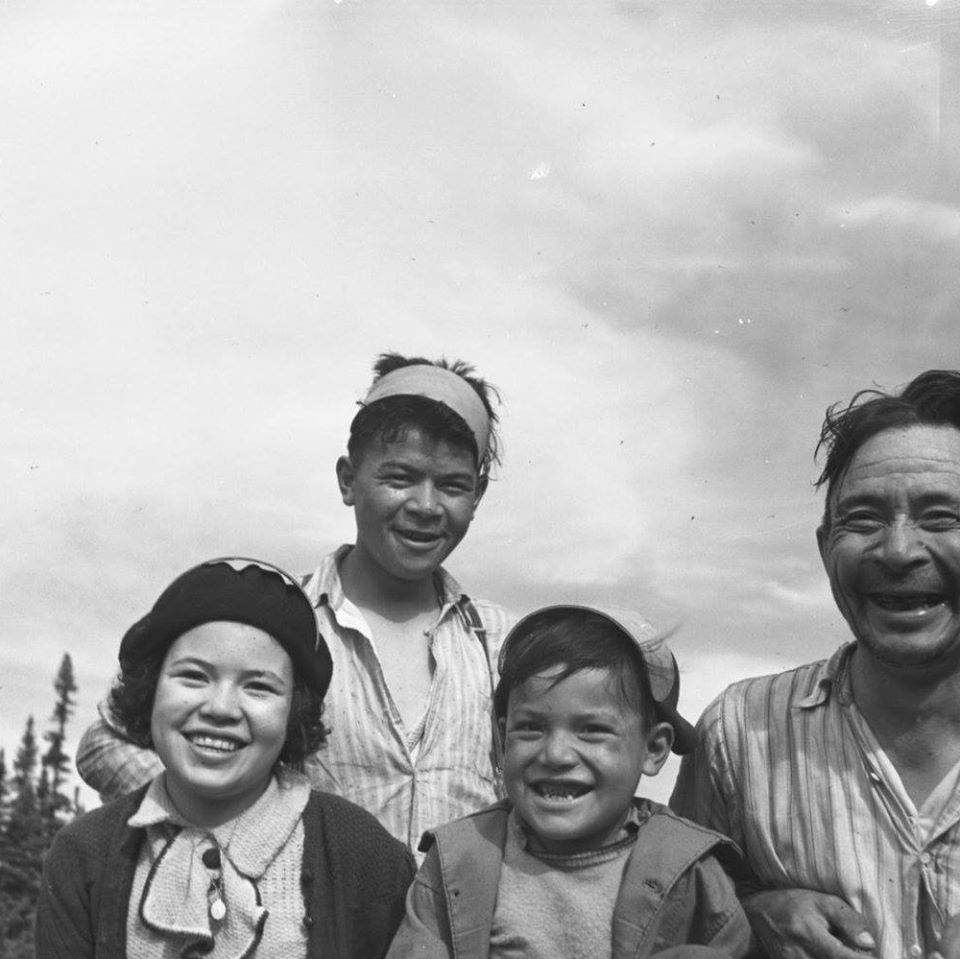
Innus of Pessamit, 1942

The members of the First Nation of Pessamit are Innu. In March 2017 the band had a total registered population of 3,953 members, 1,022 of which lived off reserve. According to Statistics Canada's 2011 Census the median age of the population is 29.3 years old.

Registered population of band members, as of May 2024:

- Total members: 4,185
- On Betsiamites Reserve: 2849
- On other reserves: 74
- Off reserve: 1259

=== Religion ===
The vast majority of the Innus of Pessamit are Catholic. The patroness saint of the church of Pessamit is Our Lady of Assumption. The elders of Pessamit are devoted to her. Traditionally the Innus of Pessamit departed for their hunting territories on 15 August, the Feast of Our Lady of Assumption.

=== Languages ===
The language of the Innu people is Innu-aimun, an Algonquian language. According to Statistics Canada's 2011 Census, on a total population of 2,420 people, 2,350 know an Aboriginal language, which represent 97% of the band population. 95.5% of the population has an Aboriginal language still spoken and understood as a first language and 96.7% speak an Aboriginal language at home. The elders of 65 years old and more still speak the ancestral language while, in the age group of 40 to 65 years old, the vocabulary about traditional activities and the forest is being lost. Among the people of less than 40 years old the knowledge of the language is decreasing at every generation and many French words are used even in conversations in Innu-aimun.

Regarding official languages 18% know both French and English while 76% know only French and 6% do not know any.

== Government ==
The Pessamit Innu Band is governed by a band council, the Conseil des Innus de Pessamit, elected according to a custom electoral system based on Section 11 of the Indian Act. For 2016-2010 tenure this council is composed of the chief Simon René and six councillors. The band is affiliated with the Mamuintun Tribal Council.

== See also ==
- First Nations in Canada
