= Montreal Light, Heat & Power =

Canadian utility company

- Predecessor: Royal Electric Company; Montreal Gas Company
- Founded: 1901
- Defunct: 1946
- Fate: Dissolved after nationalisation of assets in April 1944
- Successor: Hydro-Québec
- Headquarters: Power Building, Montreal, Quebec

The Montreal Light, Heat and Power Company (MLH&P) was a utility company operating the electric and gas distribution monopoly in the area of Montreal, Quebec, Canada, until its nationalization by the government of Quebec in 1944, under a law creating the Quebec Hydroelectric Commission, also known as Hydro-Québec.

Hydro-Québec ran both of MLH&P's electric and gas operations until 1957, when its gas properties were sold to the Corporation de gaz naturel du Québec, known today as Énergir.

The company was established in 1901 as a result of the merger of Rodolphe Forget's Royal Electric Company and Herbert Samuel Holt's Montreal Gas Company. Its name became Montreal Light, Heat and Power Consolidated in 1918 after a merger and corporate reorganization.

== Gallery ==
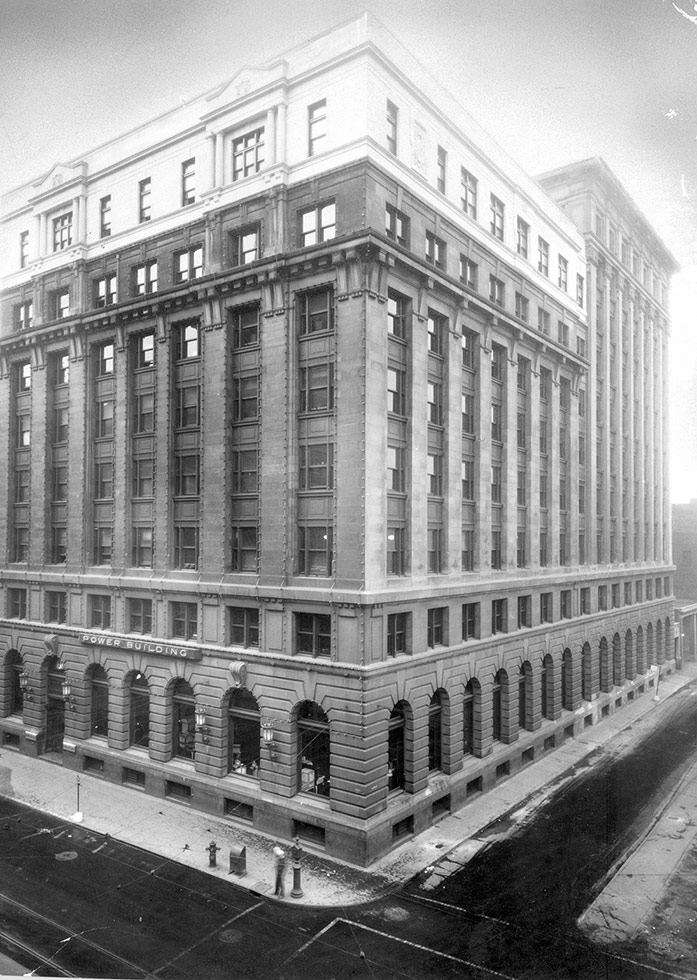
The Power Building, company headquarters, at the corner of Craig (Saint-Antoine) and Saint-Urbain, c. 1930.

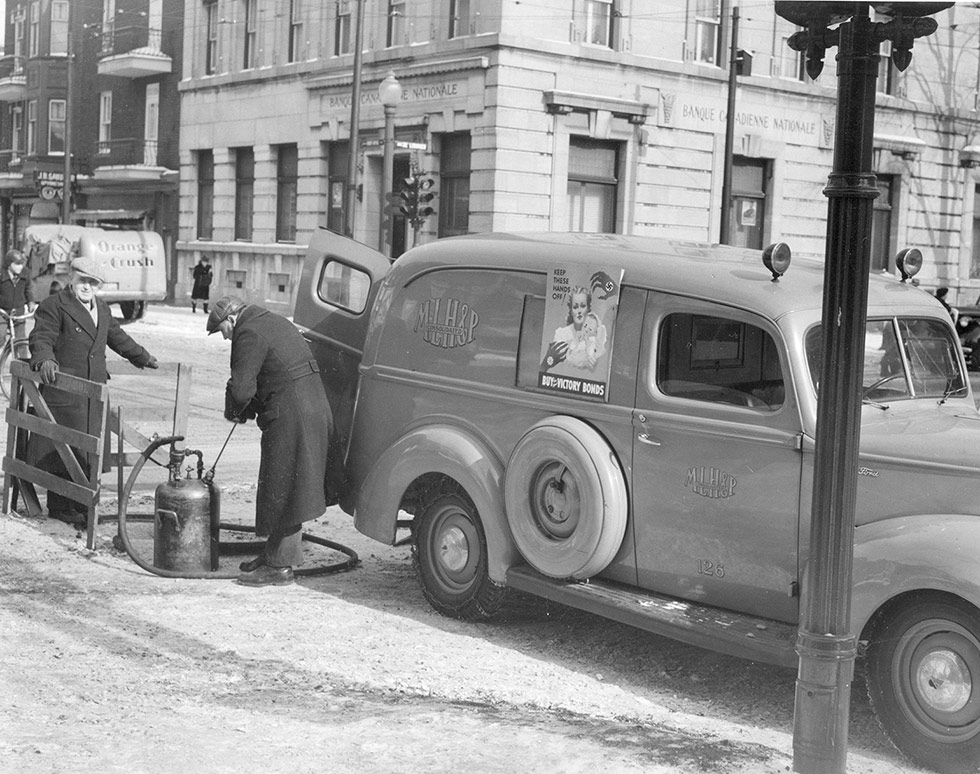
Montreal Light, Heat and Power employees fixing a gas line, 1941.

== See also ==
- History of Hydro-Québec
- Shawinigan Water & Power Company
