= Toulnustouc River =

Toulnustouc River Rivière Toulnustouc
- Location within Quebec
- Native name: Kuetutnustuku Shipu (Innu)

Location
- Country: Canada
- Province: Quebec
- Territory: Côte-Nord
- RCM: Manicouagan
- Unorg. territory: Rivière-aux-Outardes,

Physical characteristics
- Source: Lac Dechêne
  - coordinates: 51.222041°N 67.83311°W
- Mouth: Manicouagan River
  - location: Rivière-aux-Outardes
  - coordinates: 49.59361°N 68.39333°W
- Length: 253 kilometres (157 mi)
- Basin size: 11,111 square kilometres (4,290 sq mi)

Basin features
- NRC Id: EIHVH

The Toulnustouc River (French: Rivière Toulnustouc) is a tributary of the Manicouagan River in Rivière-aux-Outardes, Côte-Nord, Quebec, Canada. It is dammed to form Lake Sainte-Anne, which regulates water supply to the huge hydroelectric plants near the mouth of the Manicouagan and also feeds the Toulnustouc generating station with a capacity of 526 MW, which has been operational since 2005.

== Description ==
According to the Dictionnaire des rivières et lacs de la province de Québec (1914),

TOULNUSTOOK OR TULNUSTUK, (River) -One of the most powerful tributaries of the Manicouagan River in Saguenay County. It is about two hundred feet wide at its mouth where the current is slow and the channel deep. Its direction for the first four miles is North North-East and the current increases all the time to become a rapid at the end of this race. It flows, says Mr. C. H. Valiquette, I. C. (1908), in the middle of a valley three quarters of a mile wide composed of land suitable for cultivation. This valley, as well as the mountains which border it, is very well wooded... Above la Fourche the river runs north-west for the next eleven miles, then the river narrows little by little and the mountains become more bare with very high cliffs. This river is also called Rivière du Coude (Elbow River).

== Name ==
Toulnustouc is a term of Innu origin whose meaning is not known. According to the surveyor J. Bignell, the term means "elbow river" or "angled river" which matches the old name of Rivière du Coude (Elbow River). The Geography Commissions of Quebec and Canada define it as "river where they make canoes" or "where canoes are needed". There are also different variants: Todnustook, Tudnustouk, Tootnustook, Tulnustuk, Toulnustook and Toulnoustouc.

In the late 1970s, the Innu called it the "Kuetutnustuku Shipu" river, which means river parallel to the Manicouagan River.

== Geography ==
The Toulnustouc River flows through the unorganized territory of Rivière-aux-Outardes. The north branch, Rivière Toulnustouc Nord, leaves Dechêne Lake about 15 kilometres (9.3 mi) east of the Manicouagan Reservoir. It flows southeast through Lac Bardoux and Lac Brûleé, then turns south to Lac Caron, where it is joined by the northeast branch. The Northeast Toulnustouc River is fed by the Petit lac Manicouagan, and flows southeast and then south before turning west into Lac Caron. The Cartier Railway runs beside it for most of its length.

The combined Toulnustouc River flows SSE through Lac Fortin and Lac Bouffard and south to Lake Sainte-Anne, a reservoir. From there it flows southwest past Lac Fléché and south into the Réservoir Manic 2, which is also fed by the Manicouagan River. A hydroelectric project on the river below Lake Sainte-Anne began in 2001. The Toulnustouc generating station (capacity of 526 MW) has been operational since 2005.

== Exploitation ==
The Toulnustouc River was used for logging by Quebec North Shore Paper (now Produits Forestier Résolu). On 23 May 1962, a landslide causes the death of nine loggers who were carried into the river.

Recreational fishing is practiced on the river, especially for speckled trout. The river's surroundings are used for various activities such as fishing, hunting, canoeing, boardwalking, motorcycling and snowmobiling. There are also many resort sites.

== Sources ==
- Aménagement hydroélectrique de la Toulnustouc - Bilan des activités environnementales 2005 (in French), Hydro-Québec, May 2006
- "Centrales hydroélectriques | Hydro-Québec Production", www.hydroquebec.com (in French), 1 January 2018
- Charlotte Paquet (2017-01-28), "Une plaque disparait sur un monument érigé en 1963", Le Manic (in French)
- "Commémoration pour neuf draveurs morts en 1962", ICI.Radio-Canada.ca (in Canadian French), 23 September 2017
- "Noms de lieux - Rivière Toulnustouc", www4.rncan.gc.ca (in French), Gouvernement du Canada, Ressources naturelles Canada, Secteur des sciences de la terre, Centre canadien de cartographie et d’observation de la
- Rivière Toulnustouc, Commission de toponymie du Québec
- Rivière Toulnustouc (in French), Ressources naturelles Canada
- Rivière Toulnustouc Nord-Est (in French), Ressources naturelles Canada
- Rouillard, Eugène (1914), "Coacoachou, (Rivière)", Dictionnaire des rivières et lacs de la province de Québec (in French), Québec. Département des terres et forêts
