= Association of Canadian Engineering Companies =

Canadian organization

The Association of Consulting Engineering Companies (also known as ACEC - Canada, and formerly the Association of Canadian Engineering Companies) is an association of 600 independent engineering consultancies across Canada.

Its members offer professional engineering services to the public and private sectors worldwide. Based in Ottawa, its mission is to promote a business environment that recognizes and rewards Canadian consulting engineering companies' expertise and contributions to society.

Its members are independent consulting engineering firms as well as twelve affiliated provincial and territorial member organizations. Members range in size from single-person operations to multinational companies.

== Publication ==
The ACEC's house organ is the Canadian Consulting Engineer.
