= Pipmuacan Reservoir =

Large reservoir in Quebec, Canada

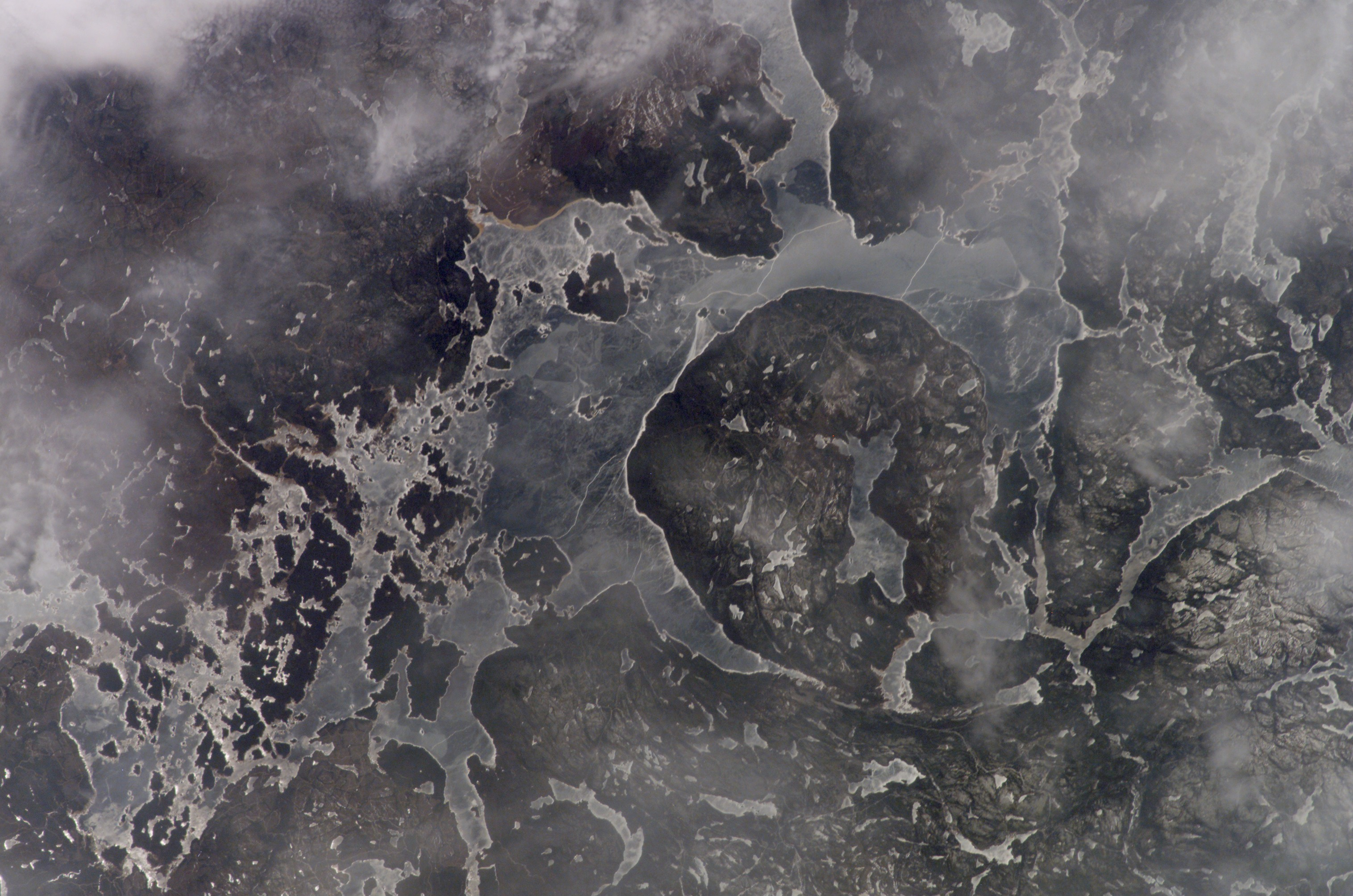
- Partial view of Pipmuacan Reservoir from the International Space Station

- Location within Quebec
- Location: Mont-Valin, Le Fjord-du-Saguenay Regional County Municipality / Lac-au-Brochet, La Haute-Côte-Nord Regional County Municipality, Quebec
- Coordinates: 49°39′42″N 70°16′18″W
- Type: artificial
- Primary inflows: Betsiamites River
- Primary outflows: Betsiamites River and Shipshaw River
- Basin countries: Canada
- Max. length: 150 km (93 mi)
- Max. width: 19 km (12 mi)
- Surface area: 978 km^{2} (378 sq mi)
- Water volume: 13.9 km^{3} (3.3 cu mi)
- Surface elevation: 396 m (1,300 ft)

The Pipmuacan Reservoir (French: Réservoir Pipmuacan) is a man-made lake on the boundary of the Saguenay–Lac-Saint-Jean and Côte-Nord regions of Quebec, Canada, about 130 kilometres (81 mi) north of Chicoutimi. It is used to control the flow for downstream hydro-electric generating stations on the Betsiamites River and, through Lake Pamouscachiou, also on the Shipshaw River. It has a total surface area of 978 square kilometres (378 sq mi) and a net area (water only) of 802 square kilometres (310 sq mi).

The reservoir is shaped highly irregularly, with many deep bays, dotted with islands in its western section, and characterized by a large rounded peninsula in the centre. Primary tributaries are the Betsiamites, Sylvestre, Hirondelles, and Pipmuacan Rivers.

The reservoir is named after Lake Pipmuacan that was flooded during the formation of the reservoir. The name is of Innu origin, that may mean "arrow". The Geographic Board reported in 1960 that "according to the missionaries of the Côte-Nord, the Innu had given this name to the lake in remembrance of their last fight with the Iroquois on Mount Pigmaugan (Pipmuacan) that overlooks the water." Other spelling variations before standardization include Pipmuakan, Pipmaugan, and Pipmakan.

The sport fish found in Pipmuacan Reservoir are northern pike, lake trout, brook trout, and lake whitefish. Outfitters provide fishing excursions and accommodations at the reservoir.

== History ==
The Pipmuacan Reservoir was formed in October 1953 when Hydro-Québec began construction on the dams and power plant of Bersimis-1. The first dam, 674 m (2,211 ft) long and 74 m (243 ft) high, was built between two mountains surrounding Lake Cassé, and the second, 315 m (1,033 ft) long, curtailed the release of water into the Desroches River. The reservoir's spillway was cut through a mountain between the two dams. By 1956, the construction work was completed.

In 2002, Hydro-Québec diverted part of the Portneuf River to the north into the Pipmuacan Reservoir to increase the capacity of the Bersimis power stations. The partial diversion of the Sault aux Cochons River is being studied to further optimize the operation of the existing stations.
