= Pessamit =

- Indian reserve
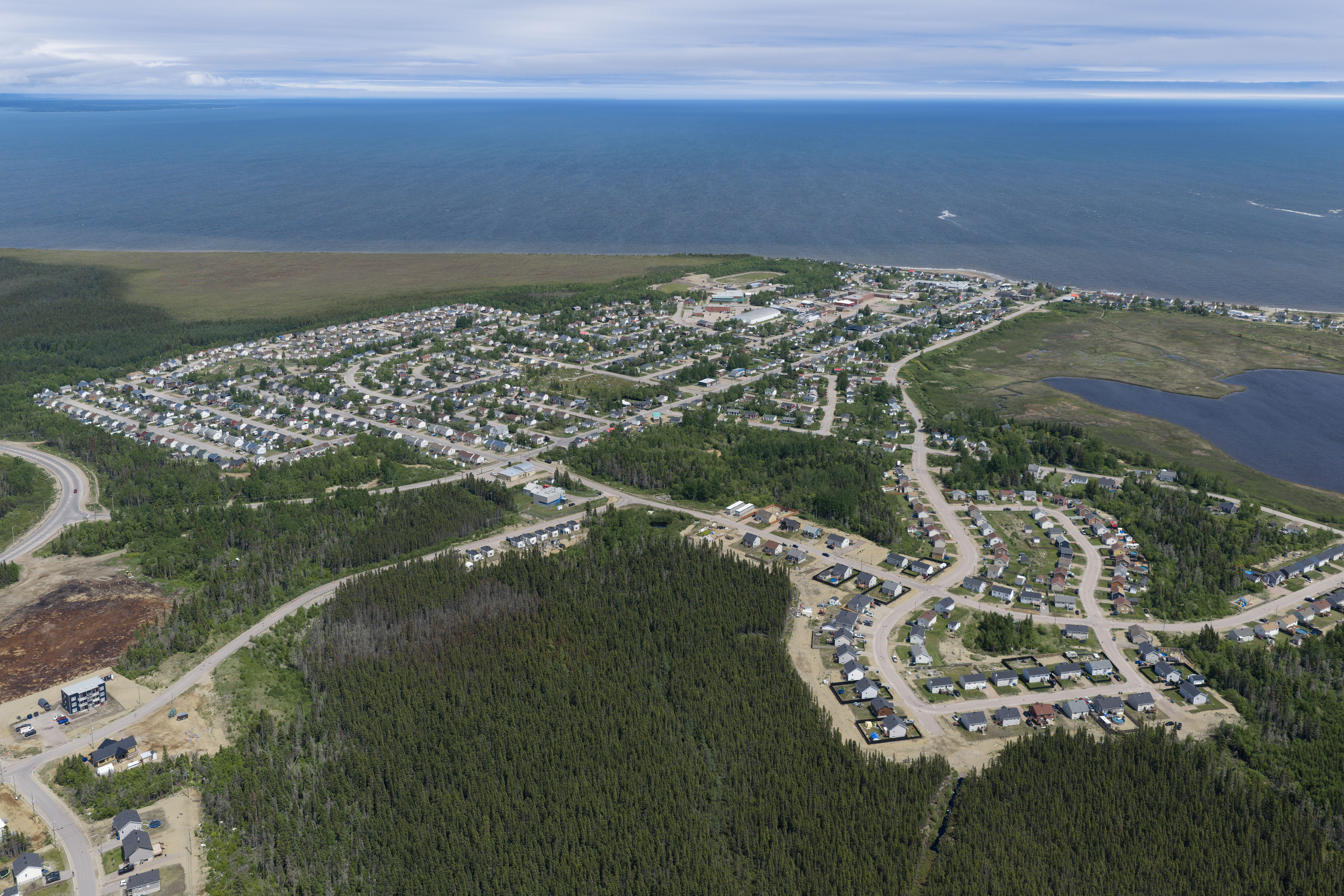
- Aerial view (2026)

- Location within Côte-Nord region, Quebec
- Coordinates: 48°57′N 68°39′W
- Country: Canada
- Province: Quebec
- Region: Côte-Nord
- Regional county: None
- Formed: 1861 (reserve)

Government
  - Federal riding: Côte-Nord—Kawawachikamach—Nitassinan
  - Prov. riding: René-Lévesque

Area
  - Land: 245.19 km^{2} (94.67 sq mi)

Population (2021)
  - Total: 2,428
  - Density: 9.9/km^{2} (26/sq mi)
- Time zone: UTC-5 (EST)
  - Summer (DST): UTC-4 (EDT)
- Postal Code: G0H 1B0
- Area codes: 418 and 581
- Website: www.pessamit.ca

Pessamit (formerly Betsiamites, or Bersimis), is a First Nations reserve and Innu community in the Canadian province of Quebec, located about 50 kilometres (31 mi) southwest from Baie-Comeau along the north shore of the Saint Lawrence River at the mouth of the Betsiamites River. It is across the river directly north of Rimouski, Quebec. It belongs to the Pessamit Innu Band.

The reserve includes the communities of Betsiamites and Papinachois.

In 1931, anthropologist Frank Speck argued that the word Betsiamites could mean "those arriving by river". However, most authors today agree that the word came from the Innu root "Pessamit", meaning of "place where there are leeches or lampreys or sea eels". The dialect spoken at Mistissini uses the older form "upesciyâmîhc" as the locative noun referring to the town, and the form "upesciyâmîw-iyiniw" in reference to the people of Pessamit. The local form of the name can be explained by phonological changes that have occurred in the local dialect. In particular, the dialect of Pessamit has undergone the following phonological changes - it regularly drops short initial vowels, it has lost consonantal pre-aspirations, it has coalesced -sc- to -ss-, and final -c's have changed to final t's. This has resulted in local pronunciation of Pessamit from the more historical upesciyâmîhc.

The names Betsiamites and Bersimis have been in use concurrently since the mid 19th century. The Innu and Oblate missionaries used Betsiamites, whereas Bersimis was preferred by Admiral Henry Wolsey Bayfield during his hydrographic surveys of the St. Lawrence and by the Hudson's Bay Company. Further interchangeable use between these names can be seen from the designation of the post offices on both sides of the Betsiamites River: on the west side, it was called Bersimis from 1863 to 1910, then Moulin-Bersimis (Bersimis-Mills) until 1945, and Rivière-Bersimis from then on. On the east side in the Innu village, the post office opened as Notre-Dame-de-Betshiamits in 1881, renamed to Bersimis in 1898 until 1919, and then took the name Betsiamites when demanded by the people. Similarly, the Indian reserve went through a few name changes: first Bersimis, then Betsiamites in 1981, and since 2008, Pessamit.

== History ==
Indigenous people had lived or visited the site for centuries prior to arrival of Europeans. Early in the 17th century, Samuel de Champlain reported the presence of an Innu village on the North Shore of the Saint Lawrence that he identified as Sauvages Bersiamiste on his map of 1632.

During the French Era, a trading post was established at the mouth of the Betsiamites River called Pointe-des-Bersimites by Gilles Hocquart in 1733 (although this post was probably located on the west bank of the Betsiamites River rather than on the east bank where the village now stands). During that same period, numerous Jesuit missionaries evangelized and converted the Innu that visited the various trading posts along the coast. Eventually the trading post became part of the North West Company's lease. When the North West Company and Hudson's Bay Company (HBC) merged in 1821, the post continued to be operated by the HBC, until the lease expired the following year. The HBC reacquired the lease of Bersimis in 1831.

In 1845, the registers of the Notre-Dame-de-Betshiamits Mission opened and a few years later in 1849, the Innu began to clear the site of present village in order to build a chapel.

In 1853, the Innu of Betsiamites were first assigned a reserve of 70,000 acres (280 km^{2}) west of the Outardes River, known as the Manicouagan Reserve, that was described by John Rolph, Commissioner of Crown Lands, as: "On the River St Lawrence from the River of Vases to the River of Outardes at Manicouagan about 11 miles in breadth by 10 miles in depth." (The River of Vases is now known as Ragueneau River, so the reserve roughly corresponded to the current municipality of Ragueneau). In 1861, the Governor General in Council allowed the Innu to move from Manicouagan to the Bersimis Reserve, that had the same area of Manicouagan Reserve, namely 70,000 acres (280 km^{2}). But the formation of the reserve hardly affected the Innu because, for many years thereafter, most families remained nomadic and would spend almost all of their lives in the forest, hunting for caribou, beaver, and bear, as well as hare and partridge to supplement their diet. In fact, the Innu were slow in adopting new techniques and improvements, such as canvas canoes or metal stoves, but rather maintained their traditional beliefs, knowledge, behaviors, and techniques.

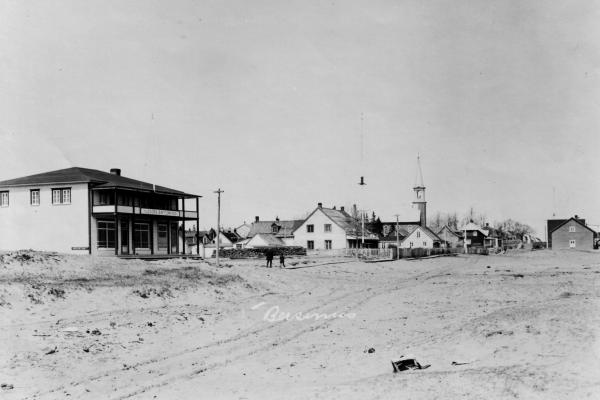
Bersimis, 1920

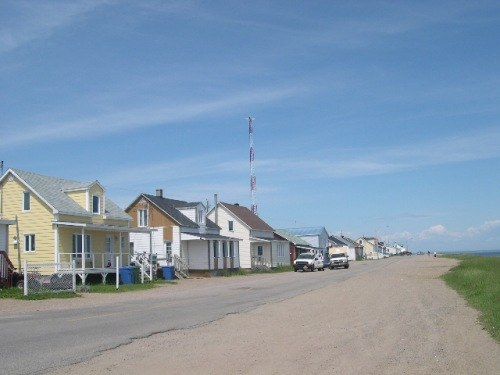
Residential street in Pessamit

Between 1871 and 1902, the Bersimis post was the headquarters of HBC's Bersimis District. From 1860 on, an industrial community developed on the west side of the Betsiamites River, known as Bersimis (now Rivière-Bersimis in the Municipality of Colombier), that by 1900 was larger than the Innu village on the east side. In 1924, the band council permitted the Government of Quebec to construct the provincial highway (Quebec Route 138) across the reserve, and in 1955, the local road between the village and the highway was built.

On February 21, 1981, the Band Council of Bersimis renamed itself and the reserve to Betsiamites. In 2005, the Betsiamites Band Council was renamed again, this time to the Innu Council of Pessamit, and on November 6, 2008, the Commission de toponymie du Québec (Quebec Geographical Names Board) agreed to change the name of the reserve to the Pessamit Indian Reserve.

== Demographics ==
Historical census populations – Pessamit, Indian reserve

Year	Pop.	±%
1976	1,686	—
1981	1,875	+11.2%
1986	1,752	−6.6%
1991	1,844	+5.3%
1996	2,042	+10.7%

Year	Pop.	±%
2001	2,288	+12.0%
2006	2,357	+3.0%
2011	2,420	+2.7%
2016	2,256	−6.8%
2021	2,428	+7.6%

Source: Statistics Canada

Private dwellings occupied by usual residents (2021): 822 (total dwellings: 841)

Mother tongue (2021):

- English as first language: 0%
- French as first language: 9.8%
- English and French as first language: 0.2%
- Other as first language: 86.3%

Registered population of band members, as of May 2024:

- Total members: 4,185
- On Betsiamites Reserve: 2849
- On other reserves: 74
- Off reserve: 1259

== Economy ==
The largest employer on the reserve is the band council, followed by Société d'aménagement et de développement forestier de Betsiamites, a forestry corporation that is managing the logging activities in the forests making up a large portion of the reserve's territory.

Economic development is led and supported by the Société de développement économique de Betsiamites, and tourism is promoted by the Développement touristique de Betsiamites, the organization that manages the Papinachois Resort and the Lac-des-Îles Outfitter.

Other economic activities include mining, wind power, and hydroelectricity projects.

== Education ==
There are two schools on the reserve:

- École Nussim - Pre-Kindergarten to elementary grade 6
- École Uashkaikan - grades secondary 1 to secondary 5
