= Betsiamites River =

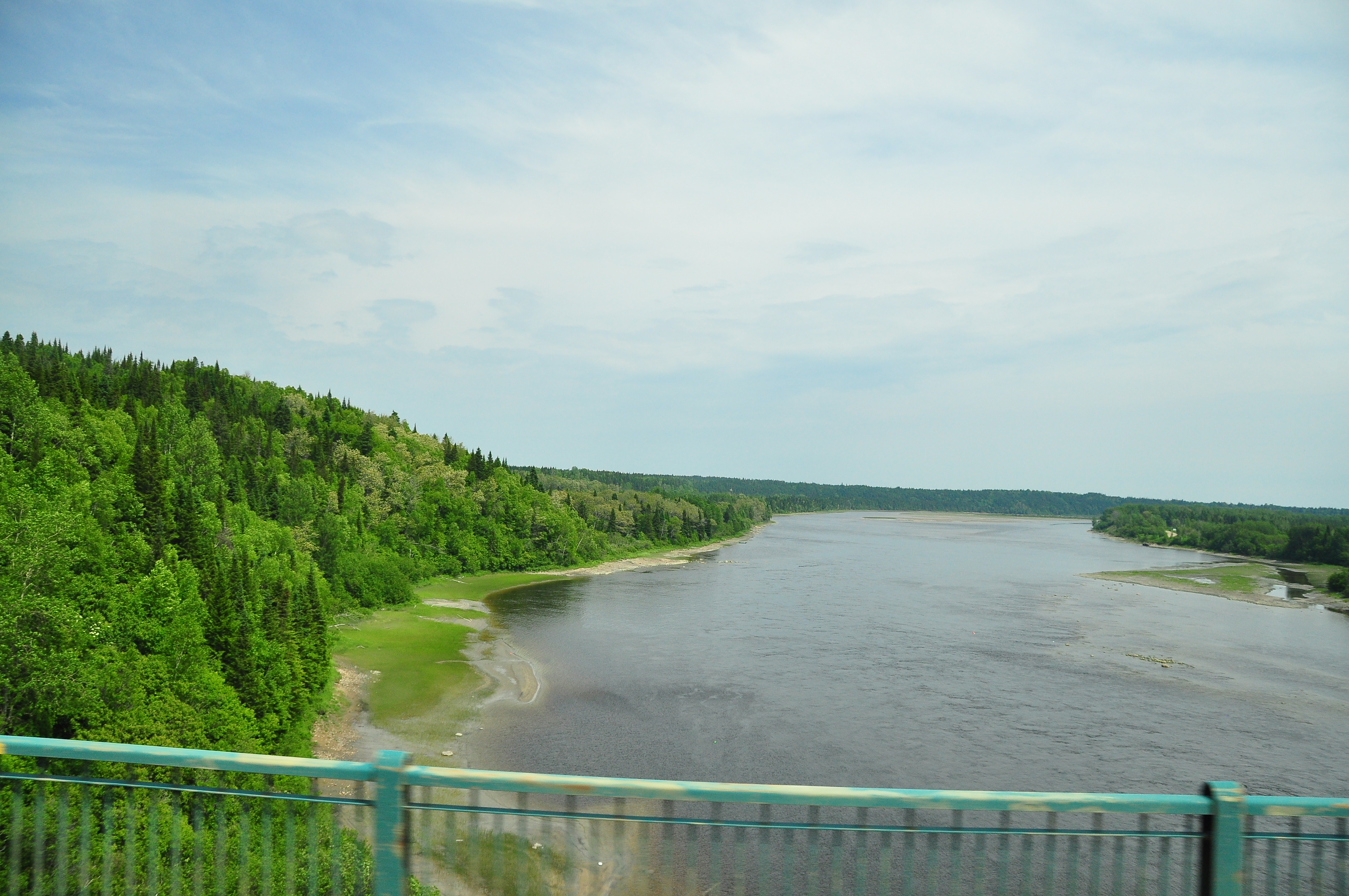

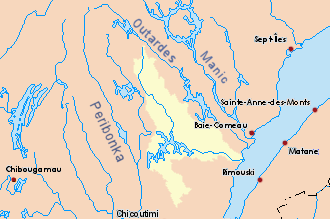
- Drainage basin in yellow

Location
- Country: Canada
- Province: Quebec
- Region: Saguenay–Lac-Saint-Jean, Côte-Nord

Physical characteristics
- Source: Lake Manouanis
  - location: Mont-Valin
  - coordinates: 50°45′10″N 70°19′20″W
- Mouth: Saint Lawrence River
  - location: Betsiamites FN Reserve
  - coordinates: 48°56′00″N 68°37′20″W
  - elevation: 0 m (0 ft)
- Length: 444 km (276 mi)to head of Manouanis River
- Basin size: 18,700 km^{2} (7,200 sq mi)
- Discharge
  - average: 340 m^{3}/s (12,000 cu ft/s)

The Betsiamites (also called Bersimis) is a river of Côte-Nord, Quebec, Canada, which joins the Saint Lawrence River.

The 978 square kilometres (378 sq mi) Pipmuacan Reservoir, impounded by the Bersimis-1 Dam, is roughly halfway down its course.

== Hydro-electric facilities ==
There are two hydro-electric power stations and dams on the Betsiamites, owned by Hydro-Québec:

- Bersimis-1 generating station: 1,125 MW; constructed in 1956
- Bersimis-2 generating station: 845 MW; constructed in 1959
