= Huard =

Huard may refer to:

== Surname ==
- Bill Huard (born 1967), Canadian National Hockey League player
- Brock Huard (born 1976), American football player
- Camille Huard (born 1951), Canadian boxer
- Damon Huard (born 1973), American football player
- Frances Wilson Huard (1885–1969), American-born writer, translator, and lecturer
- Gaëtan Huard (born 1962), French footballer
- John Huard (1944–2025), American football player and coach
- Laurent Huard (born 1973), French football coach, player and assistant manager
- Luke Huard (born 1979), American football coach
- Patrick Huard, Canadian actor, comedian and film maker
- Pierre Huard (1901–1983), French professor of medicine
- Sam Huard (born 2002), American football player
- Victor-Alphonse Huard (1853–1929), French-Canadian churchman, naturalist, writer, editor, educator and promoter of the natural sciences
- Huard family, characters in the 2006 film Annapolis

== Places ==
- Huard River, Quebec, Canada
- Huard Lake, Quebec

== Slang ==
- French-Canadian slang for a Canadian dollar

== See also ==
- Abbé Huard River, Quebec
- Abbé Huard Lake, Quebec
