= Romaine-1 Generating Station =

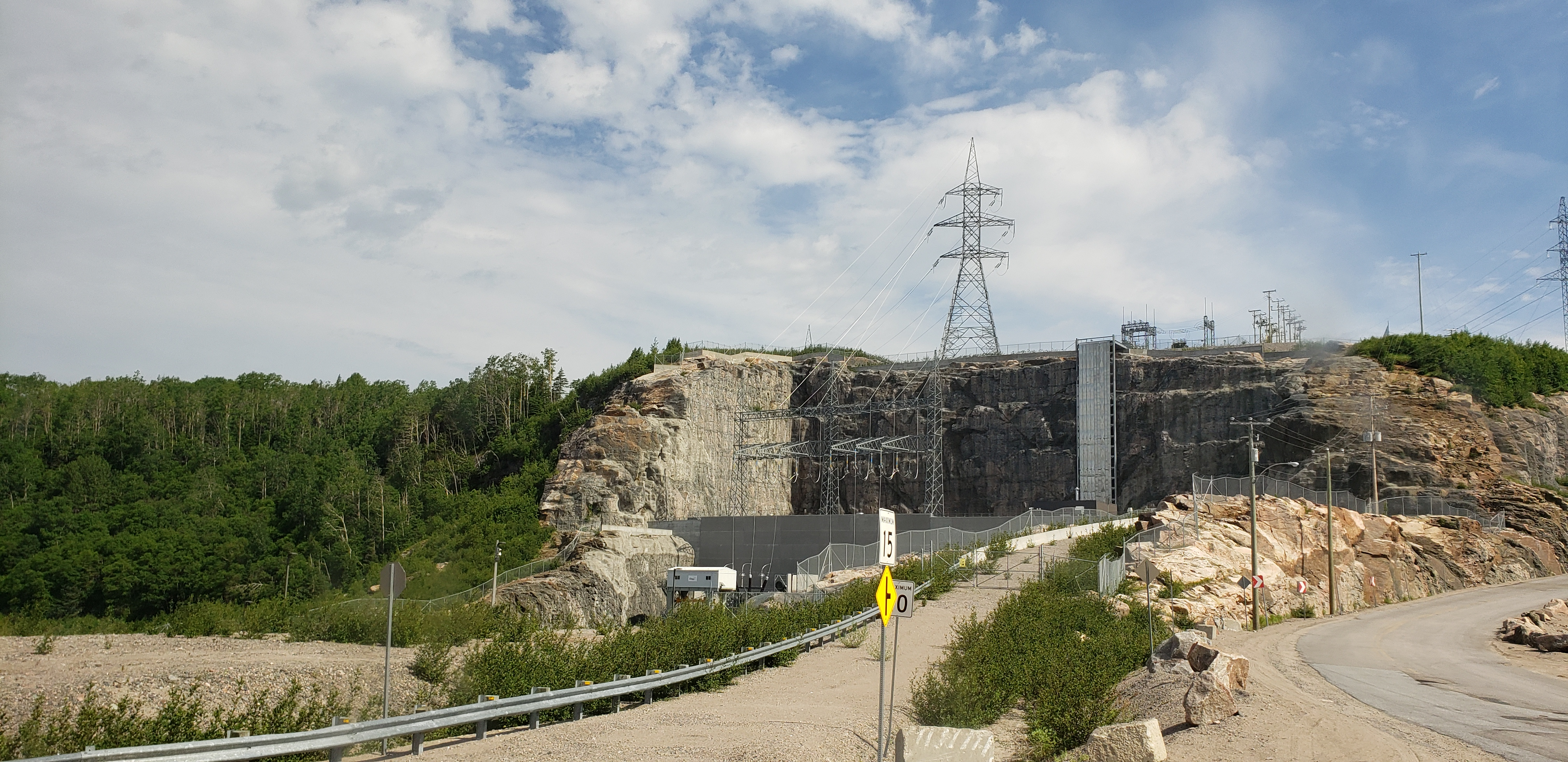
- General view of the Romaine-1 powerhouse

- Location within Quebec
- Official name: Centrale de la Romaine-1
- Country: Canada
- Location: Havre-Saint-Pierre, Minganie, Quebec
- Coordinates: 50.387777°N 63.252777°W
- Owner: Hydro-Québec

Dam and spillways
- Impounds: Romaine River
- Height (foundation): 40.1 metres (132 ft)
- Dam volume: 147,000,000 cubic metres (5.2×10^{9} cu ft)

Reservoir
- Total capacity: 147,000,000 cubic metres (5.2×10^{9} cu ft)
- Surface area: 12 square kilometres (4.6 sq mi)

Plant
- Commission date: 25 November 2015
- Installed capacity: 270 MW
- Capacity factor: 0.59
- Annual generation: 1.4 TWh

The Romaine-1 Generating Station (French: Centrale de la Romaine-1) is a 270 MW hydroelectric generating station on the Romaine River in the Côte-Nord region of the province of Quebec, Canada. It is owned and operated by Hydro-Québec.

== Location ==
The dam is on the Romaine River in the municipality of Havre-Saint-Pierre in the Minganie Regional County Municipality, Quebec. It is 52.5 kilometres (32.6 mi) from the mouth of the river. The site is open to visitors, who can visit three floors of the generating station and walk on the dam.

== Description ==
The Romaine-1 Dam (Barrage de la Romaine-1) is 40.1 metres (132 ft) high and has a holding capacity of 147,000,000 cubic metres (5.2×10^{9} cu ft). It is zoned rockfill, with a waterproofing screen. The foundation is treated rock. The reservoir covers 12 square kilometres (4.6 sq mi). Peak surface elevation is 82.3 metres (270 ft). Drawdown from peak to minimum water levels is just 1.5 metres (4 ft 11 in).

A short canal carries water from just west of the dam to the generating station's water intake. The plant does not have a feed gallery or a surge chamber. It has two Francis-type turbine generator units. The generating station has capacity of 270 MW. The utilization factor is 0.59. Annual average production is 1.4 TW. With its small reservoir, Romaine-1 gives off low and variable greenhouse gas emissions, and in this is similar to a run-of-the-river station. The Romaine complex as a whole is one of the most efficient in Quebec in terms of CO_{2} equivalent emissions per TWh.

== History ==
The dams and generating station are part of a huge hydroelectric complex with four dams on the Romaine River. The overall Romaine project was formally launched by Quebec premier Jean Charest in May 2009. A 150 kilometres (93 mi) road was built to provide access to the four dams. The Murailles camp at 35.7 kilometres (22.2 mi) from the start of the road was built to house up to 2,408 workers on the Romaine 2 and Romaine 1 projects.

The project was completed in 42 months, 7 months ahead of schedule. On 25 November 2015 Hydro-Québec announced that the generating station had been commissioned with a group of turbine generators producing 135 MW of power. A second group of generators was planned to start up later that year. Romaine-1 is the second power station commissioned on the Romaine River. The first was the 640 MW Romaine-2.

In September 2017 Hydro-Québec had said it had no plans for more dams due to the present surplus of electricity. During the inauguration of Romaine-3 in October 2017, Quebec premier Philippe Couillard confirmed that no more major projects were planned.

== Controversies ==
The company had to negotiate several agreements with the local Innu communities, paying more than CDN$200 million over a 60-year period to compensate for the effects of the dams, roads and electric transmission lines.

There were a number of controversies. In March 2012 Quebec Route 138 was blocked at Maliotenam by the Innu, who were demanding compensation for the power lines on their territory. In June 2015 Route 138 was blocked at Pessamit and Maliotenam, and the access road to the construction site was blocked, by construction workers demanding that more local workers be hired. In July 2015 the road to the site was blocked by the Innu of Natashquan who felt that Hydro-Quebec did not respect the agreement signed in 2008. In March 2016 a court rejected the demand by Innu families of Uashat mak Mani-utenam to stop the project. In November 2016 there was controversy over the waste of wood cut in the reservoirs.

== Sources ==
- Barrage de la Romaine-1, Natural Resources Canada
- Bergeron, Patrice (18 October 2017), "La centrale Romaine-3 inaugurée sur la Côte-Nord", Le Soleil (in French)
- Hydro-Québec met en service la centrale Romaine-1 (in French), Radio-Canada, 27 November 2015
- "Inauguration de la centrale Romaine-3", Ici Radio Canada (in French), 19 October 2017
- Joint Review Panel (February 2009), Romaine Hydroelectric Complex Project (PDF), Ottawa: Canadian Environmental Assessment Agency, Quebec bureau d'audiences publiques sur l'environnement, archived from the original (PDF) on December 21, 2021
- La centrale de la Romaine-1 (in French), Tourisme Côte-Nord
- Paul, Mireille (17 April 2009), Rapport d'analyse environnementale pour le projet d'aménagement du complexe hydroélectrique de la rivière Romaine ... par Hydro-Québec (PDF) (in French)
- Romaine-1, Barrage de la (in French), Ministère de l’Environnement et de la Lutte contre les changements climatiques
- Tournier, Jean-Pierre; Bennett, Tony; Bibeau, Johanne (8 August 2019), Sustainable and Safe Dams Around the World / Un monde de barrages durables et sécuritaires, Proceedings of the ICOLD 2019 Symposium, (ICOLD 2019), June 9-14, 2019, Ottawa, Canada / Publications du symposium CIGB 2019, juin 9-14, 2019, Ottawa, Canada, CRC Press, ISBN 978-1-00-059682-3
