= Poste Montagnais =

Electrical substation in Quebec

Coordinates: 51°53′30″N 65°43′45″W

Location of Poste Montagnais in the Côte-Nord region, Quebec

Poste Montagnais (French pronunciation: [pɔst mɔ̃taɲɛ]) or Poste des Montagnais ([- de -]) is the site of Hydro-Québec's electrical substation Poste Montagnais (English: Montagnais Substation) in the Côte-Nord region, approximately 12 km (7.5 mi) south of the border of Labrador. According to the Canadian Geographical Names Database, part of Natural Resources Canada, it is located in Lac-Jérôme, in the extreme western part of the Minganie Regional County Municipality but is in the Sept-Rivières Regional County Municipality.

== Power Substation ==
The substation was built in the 1970s along a series of 735kV transmission lines connecting to the Churchill Falls Generating Station and was the location of a failure that caused a major blackout throughout the province in September 1977. It was also the location of similar failures causing two blackouts in November 1988. The first failure on November 15, 1988, lead to an enquiry by provincial Energy Minister John Ciaccia. The second failure on November 26, 1988, was initially falsely attributed by Hydro Quebec to the magnitude 5.9 1988 Saguenay earthquake. In the mid-2010s additional transmission lines were constructed, connecting the substation to the Romaine-3 and Romaine-4 Generating Stations on the Romaine River in the Côte-Nord region.

== Transportation ==
The substation is served by the Poste Montagnais Airport. It is also adjacent to mile 134 of the Quebec North Shore and Labrador Railway.

== Climate ==
Poste Montagnais has a subarctic climate (Köppen climate classification Dfc), with long cold winters and short warm summers. The warmest temperature recorded was 33 °C (91.40 °F) on June 23, 1989. The coldest temperature recorded was −50 °C (−58.00 °F) on January 30, 1976. Poste Montagnais has pretty much uniform precipitation throughout the year with slightly more in the summer months. During the winter Poste Montagnais accumulates 286.1 centimetres (112.64 in) of snow which melts in the spring.

Climate data for Poste Montagnais, Quebec (1981-2010): 595m
Month	Jan	Feb	Mar	Apr	May	Jun	Jul	Aug	Sep	Oct	Nov	Dec	Year
Record high °C (°F)	5.5 (41.9)	7.8 (46.0)	13.9 (57.0)	17.8 (64.0)	28.0 (82.4)	33.0 (91.4)	32.2 (90.0)	32.2 (90.0)	27.2 (81.0)	18.9 (66.0)	10.0 (50.0)	5.0 (41.0)	33.0 (91.4)
Mean daily maximum °C (°F)	−15.7 (3.7)	−12.5 (9.5)	−5.6 (21.9)	2.4 (36.3)	10.0 (50.0)	16.6 (61.9)	19.6 (67.3)	18.2 (64.8)	12.4 (54.3)	3.9 (39.0)	−3.7 (25.3)	−11.4 (11.5)	2.8 (37.1)
Daily mean °C (°F)	−22.1 (−7.8)	−19.5 (−3.1)	−12.6 (9.3)	−3.6 (25.5)	4.1 (39.4)	10.2 (50.4)	13.5 (56.3)	12.2 (54.0)	7.3 (45.1)	0.0 (32.0)	−8.2 (17.2)	−17.1 (1.2)	−3.0 (26.6)
Mean daily minimum °C (°F)	−28.5 (−19.3)	−26.6 (−15.9)	−19.5 (−3.1)	−9.5 (14.9)	−1.8 (28.8)	3.9 (39.0)	7.4 (45.3)	6.3 (43.3)	2.2 (36.0)	−3.9 (25.0)	−12.7 (9.1)	−22.8 (−9.0)	−8.8 (16.2)
Record low °C (°F)	−50.0 (−58.0)	−49.0 (−56.2)	−47.0 (−52.6)	−36.1 (−33.0)	−20.0 (−4.0)	−10.0 (14.0)	−3.3 (26.1)	−5.0 (23.0)	−13.9 (7.0)	−22.8 (−9.0)	−37.0 (−34.6)	−48.9 (−56.0)	−50.0 (−58.0)
Average precipitation mm (inches)	51.1 (2.01)	45.5 (1.79)	48.4 (1.91)	41.2 (1.62)	64.4 (2.54)	82.5 (3.25)	112.0 (4.41)	103.7 (4.08)	86.7 (3.41)	72.6 (2.86)	78.3 (3.08)	62.9 (2.48)	849.3 (33.44)
Average rainfall mm (inches)	0.5 (0.02)	2.9 (0.11)	2.4 (0.09)	8.4 (0.33)	54.3 (2.14)	82.0 (3.23)	112.0 (4.41)	103.7 (4.08)	84.3 (3.32)	46.2 (1.82)	17.9 (0.70)	2.3 (0.09)	516.9 (20.34)
Average snowfall cm (inches)	50.0 (19.7)	42.5 (16.7)	46.2 (18.2)	31.8 (12.5)	9.0 (3.5)	0.4 (0.2)	0.0 (0.0)	0.0 (0.0)	2.2 (0.9)	26.5 (10.4)	59.2 (23.3)	59.6 (23.5)	327.4 (128.9)
Source 1: Ministère de l’Environnement
Source 2: Environment Canada (1971-2000 extremes)
