= Abbé Huard Lake =

Lake in Quebec, Canada

- Lac de l' Abbé Huard
- Uauiekamas (Innu)
- Location within Quebec
- Location: Lac-Jérôme, Minganie, Côte-Nord, Quebec
- Coordinates: 51.240321°N 62.885897°W
- Primary inflows: Four discharges from lakes and mountain streams
- Primary outflows: Abbé Huard River
- Basin countries: Canada
- Max. length: 2.85 kilometres (1.77 mi)
- Max. width: 1.35 kilometres (0.84 mi)
- Surface elevation: 459 metres (1,506 ft)
- Islands: 1

Abbé Huard Lake (French: Lac de l' Abbé Huard) is a small lake in the Côte-Nord region of the province of Quebec, Canada. It is drained by the Abbé Huard River, a tributary of the Romaine River.

== Location ==
Abbé Huard Lake is in the unorganized territory of Lac-Jérôme in the Minganie Regional County Municipality. The lake is a little more than 100 kilometres (62 mi) north of the municipality of Baie-Johan-Beetz on the north shore of the Gulf of Saint Lawrence. It is the source of the Abbé-Huard River, a tributary of the Romaine River. The river is the second northeast branch of the Romaine River. The lake is about 20 kilometres (12 mi) east of the Romaine 3 Reservoir. A map of the ecological regions of Quebec shows the lake on the border between sub-regions 6j-S and 6n-T of the east spruce/moss subdomain.

== Name ==
Abbé Huard Lake is named after the abbé Victor-Alphonse Huard (1853–1929), a naturalist and a professor at the Chicoutimi Seminary. He visited the region between Pessamit and Natashquan in 1895, and described the trip in his Labrador et Anticosti (1897). In his Dictionary of Rivers and Lakes of the Province of Quebec (1914), Eugène Rouillard points out the lake was probably named after the Abbé Huard before the river. The Innu call the river Uauiekamau Hipu, or "Round Lake River". The Naskapi call the river Umuauk Shipu or "Loon River", a literal translation of the French Rivière Huard.

== Usage ==
A 2007 report stated that Abbé-Huard Lake (Uauiekamas) had last been visited in fall about ten years ago by a family that also visits Abbé-Huard River and Nuhetihk Lake. They stayed for three months, mostly trapping beaver and marten from camp 140. A 2018 report said that Abbé Huard Lake is used by the indigenous people of the region every two or three years. For example, in August 2016 two Innu users spent five days on the lake fishing for brook trout. They traveled there by float plane provided by the Innu Aitun committee, stayed in a family camp built in the fall of 2015, and used a paddle boat for trips on the lake. In September 2016 the two Innu spent a week on the lake hunting for moose, caribou, partridge and beaver, and fishing for brook trout. The took four beavers but no deer. As before they flew in and stayed at the family camp. The informant did not notice any changes to the region around the lake during his two visits.

== Sources ==
- AECOM (January 2018), "Lac de l'Abbé-Huard", Complexe de la Romaine. Occupation et utilisation du territoire par les Innus d’Ekuanitshit et de Nutashkuan (2016) (PDF) (in French), Hydro-Québec
- Hydro-Québec (December 2007), "Lacs de l'Abbé-Huard (Uauiekamas), Saumur (Uauiekamau) et Lesage (Kahetapahkahuau-nipi)", Complexe de la Romaine – Étude d’impact sur l’environnement (PDF) (in French), vol. 6 : Milieu humain – Communautés innues et archéologie
- Lac de l'Abbé-Huard (in French), Commission de toponymie du Québec
- Lac de l'Abbé-Huard (in French), Ressources naturelles Canada
- Rouillard, Eugène (1914), "Abbé Huard (Lac)", Dictionnaire des rivières et lacs de la province de Québec (in French), Québec. Département des terres et forêts
- Saucier, J.-P.; Robitaille, A.; Grondin, P.; Bergeron, J.-F.; Gosselin, J. (2011), Les régions écologiques du Québec méridional (PDF) (map), 4 (in French), Ministère des Ressources naturelles et de la Faune, archived from the original (PDF) on 2020-06-19

== See also ==
- Lac-Jérôme, an unorganized territory
- Abbé Huard River
- Romaine River
