= Romaine 2, Quebec =

Romaine 2, Quebec may refer to:

- Romaine-2 Generating Station, a hydroelectric generating station on the Romaine River in the Côte-Nord region of Quebec, Canada
- La Romaine, Quebec, an Innu First Nations reserve in the Côte-Nord region of Quebec, Canada
