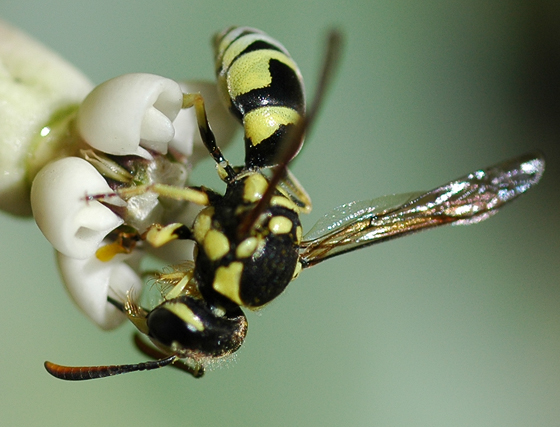

Scientific classification
- Domain: Eukaryota
- Kingdom: Animalia
- Phylum: Arthropoda
- Class: Insecta
- Order: Hymenoptera
- Family: Vespidae
- Subfamily: Eumeninae
- Genus: Pterocheilus; Klug, 1905

Type species
- Pterocheilus phaleratus (Panzer, 1797)

Species
- See text

= Pterocheilus =

Genus of wasps

Pterocheilus is an essentially holarctic genus of potter wasps with a fairly rich diversity in North America and a single Afrotropical species Pterocheilus eurystomus Kohl 1906 known from Socotra. They are usually rather large wasps characterized by reduced tegulae and prominently pilose labial palpi.

== Species ==
The following species are classified under Pterocheilus:

- Pterocheilus acuceps Bohart, 1940
- Pterocheilus albofasciatus Smith, 1878
- Pterocheilus arabicus Giordani Soika, 1970
- Pterocheilus arizonicus Bohart, 1940
- Pterocheilus asperatus (Bohart, 1999)
- Pterocheilus auriantius Kostylev, 1940
- Pterocheilus bakeri Cameron, 1909
- Pterocheilus biglumis (Saussure, 1852)
- Pterocheilus biplagiatus Cresson, 1879
- Pterocheilus chesteri Carpenter, 1986
- Pterocheilus chobauti Dusmet, 1928
- Pterocheilus coccineus André, 1884
- Pterocheilus comptus Cresson, 1879
- Pterocheilus crispocornis Bohart, 1940
- Pterocheilus cyathopus Bohart, 1940
- Pterocheilus cyrenaicus Gribodo, 1924
- Pterocheilus decorus Cresson, 1879
- Pterocheilus denticulatus (Saussure, 1855)
- Pterocheilus desertorum Bohart, 1940
- Pterocheilus diversicolor Rohwer, 1911
- Pterocheilus dives Radoszkowski, 1876
- Pterocheilus eurystomus Kohl, 1906
- Pterocheilus heptneri Kostylev, 1940
- Pterocheilus hirsutipennis Bohart, 1940
- Pterocheilus hurdi Bohart, 1950
- Pterocheilus joffrei Dusmet, 1917
- Pterocheilus kamanensis Gusenleitner, 1967
- Pterocheilus laticeps Cresson, 1872
- Pterocheilus linsleyi Bohart, 1940
- Pterocheilus maltsevi Kostylev, 1940
- Pterocheilus mandibularis Morawitz, 1889
- Pterocheilus merpeba Giordani Soika, 1943
- Pterocheilus mexicanus Saussure, 1870
- Pterocheilus micheneri Bohart, 1940
- Pterocheilus mirandus Cresson, 1897
- Pterocheilus modestus Kostylev, 1935
- Pterocheilus mongolicus Kohl, 1907
- Pterocheilus morrisoni Cresson, 1879
- Pterocheilus napalkovi Kurzenko, 1977
- Pterocheilus nigricaudus Bohart, 1940
- Pterocheilus nigrobilineolatus Giordani Soika, 1942
- Pterocheilus numida Lepeletier, 1841
- Pterocheilus oregonensis Bohart, 1940
- Pterocheilus paenacuceps Bohart, 1950
- Pterocheilus panamintensis Bohart, 1940
- Pterocheilus pedicellatus Bohart, 1940
- Pterocheilus peninsularis Bohart, 1948
- Pterocheilus perpunctatus Giordani Soika, 1970
- Pterocheilus phaleratus (Panzer 1797)
- Pterocheilus pimorum (Viereck, 1908)
- Pterocheilus propinquus Kostylev, 1940
- Pterocheilus provancheri (Huard, 1897)
- Pterocheilus pruinosus Cameron, 1908
- Pterocheilus pusillus Kostylev, 1940
- Pterocheilus quaesitus (Moravitz, 1895)
- Pterocheilus quinquefasciatus Say, 1824
- Pterocheilus schwarzi Gusenleitner, 1994
- Pterocheilus sculleni Bohart, 1950
- Pterocheilus seneconis Rohwer, 1911
- Pterocheilus sibiricus (Moravitz, 1867)
- Pterocheilus sparsipunctatus Bohart, 1950
- Pterocheilus tenebricosus Gusenleitner, 1998
- Pterocheilus texanus Cresson, 1872
- Pterocheilus timberlakei Bohart, 1940
- Pterocheilus trachysomus Bohart, 1940
- Pterocheilus trichogaster Bohart, 1940
- Pterocheilus tricoloratus Bohart, 1940
- Pterocheilus varius Gusenleitner, 2002
- Pterocheilus wollmanni Kostylev, 1940
