= Abbé Huard River =

Abbé Huard River Rivière de l'Abbé-Huard
- Location within Quebec
- Native name: Uauiekamau Hipu (Innu)

Location
- Country: Canada
- Province: Quebec
- Region: Côte-Nord
- RCM: Minganie
- Unorganized territory: Lac-Jérôme

Physical characteristics
- Source: Abbé Huard Lake
  - coordinates: 51.238047°N 62.897912°W
  - elevation: 459 metres (1,506 ft)
- Mouth: Romaine River
  - location: Lac-Jérôme
  - coordinates: 50.983611°N 63.289722°W
  - elevation: 225 metres (738 ft)
- Basin size: 1,025 square kilometres (396 sq mi)

Abbé Huard River (French: Rivière de l'Abbé-Huard) is a river in the Côte-Nord region of the province of Quebec, Canada. It is a tributary of the Romaine River. The lower part of the river, where it meandered through sand and gravel deposits, has been flooded by the Romaine-2 reservoir.

== Location ==
The Abbé-Huard River, a tributary of the Romaine River, originates in Abbé Huard Lake. The lake is in the unorganized territory of Lac-Jérôme in the Minganie Regional County Municipality. It is a little more than 100 kilometres (62 mi) north of the municipality of Baie-Johan-Beetz on the north shore of the Gulf of Saint Lawrence. The river is the second northeast branch of the Romaine River. The mouth of the river, where it meets the Romaine River, is also in Lac-Jérôme. Before the river was flooded, the Abbé-Huard entered the Romaine at PK 131.

== Name ==
Abbé Huard Lake is named after the abbé Victor-Alphonse Huard (1853–1929), a naturalist and a professor at the Chicoutimi Seminary. He visited the region between Pessamit and Natashquan in 1895, and described the trip in his Labrador et Anticosti (1897). In his Dictionary of Rivers and Lakes of the Province of Quebec (1914), Eugène Rouillard points out the lake was probably named after the Abbé Huard before the river. The Innu call the river Uauiekamau Hipu, or "Round Lake River". The Naskapi call the river Umuauk Shipu or "Loon River", a literal translation of the French Rivière Huard.

== Basin ==
The river basin covers 1,025 square kilometres (396 sq mi). The river flows along the contact zone between rocks of the Anorthositic Suite of Havre-Saint-Pierre to the north, and deformed rocks to the south. A map of the ecological regions of Quebec shows the river on the border between sub-regions 6j-S and 6n-T of the east spruce/moss subdomain.

== Flooded section ==
The lower part of the Abbé-Huard River now forms the northeast arm of the Romaine-2 reservoir. Before the Romaine-2 reservoir was flooded, the mouth of the river flowed between terraces of sand and gravel. These banks typically rose from 3 to 5 metres (9.8 to 16.4 ft) above the watercourse. About 8 kilometres (5.0 mi) of the river's banks were subject to active erosion, mostly on the concave shores. There was a well-developed delta at the river mouth. Water temperatures at the mouth of the river where it entered the Romaine ranged from an average of 0 °C (32 °F) in January to 15.7 °C (60.3 °F) in July. The flooded section was thought to have high archaeological potential, but a survey found no sites.

== Sources ==
- Archéotec inc. (March 2004), Complexe Romaine Aménagements hydroélectriques Romaine 1, 2, 3 et 4 Parcs à carburant et stations limnimétriques Inventaire archéologique mai 2003 (PDF) (in French), Hydro-Québec
- Bilodeau, Laurent (November 2007), Complexe Romaine, avant-projet phase 2 Régime thermique de l'eau Rapport Sectoriel (PDF) (in French), Hydro-Québec Équipement
- Complexe de la Romaine, Caractérisation des sites de mise bas du caribou (PDF) (maps) (in French), MRN Québec, 2004
- Lac de l'Abbé-Huard (in French), Commission de toponymie du Québec
- Lac de l'Abbé-Huard (in French), Ressources naturelles Canada
- Poly-Geo Inc. (March 2006), Complexe de la Romaine, Étude de la dynamique sédimentaire (PDF) (in French), Hydro-Québec Équipement, archived from the original (PDF) on 2019-10-18
- Rivière de l'Abbé-Huard (in French), Ressources naturelles Canada
- Rouillard, Eugène (1914), "Abbé Huard (Lac)", Dictionnaire des rivières et lacs de la province de Québec (in French), Québec. Département des terres et forêts
- Saucier, J.-P.; Robitaille, A.; Grondin, P.; Bergeron, J.-F.; Gosselin, J. (2011), Les régions écologiques du Québec méridional (PDF) (map), 4 (in French), Ministère des Ressources naturelles et de la Faune, archived from the original (PDF) on 2020-06-19

== See also ==
- Lac-Jérôme, an unorganized territory
- Romaine River
- List of rivers of Quebec
