= Brûlé Lake (Romaine) =

Lake in Quebec and Labrador, Canada

- Lac Brûlé
- Upuapuhkau Nipi (Innu)
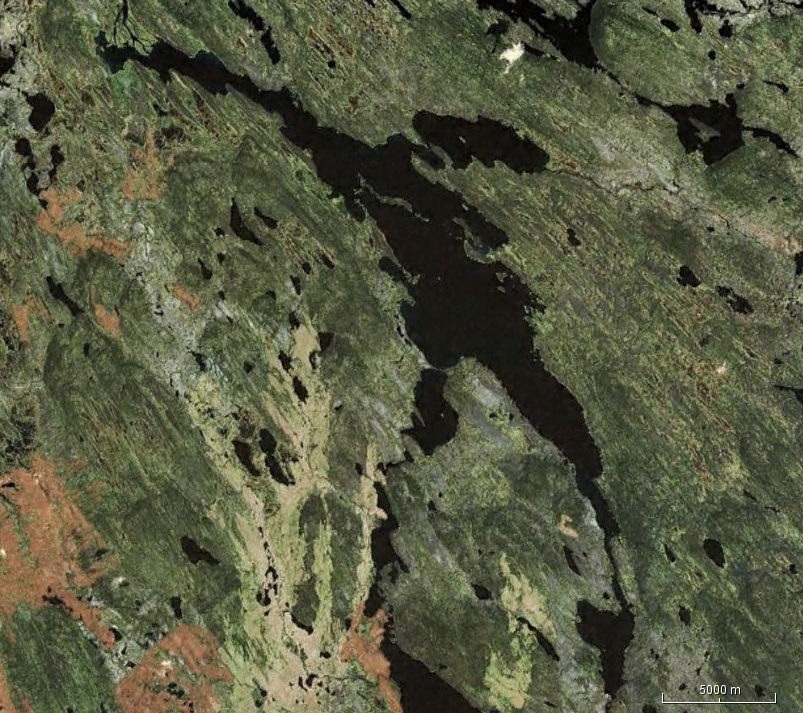
- Satellite view

- Location within Quebec
- Location: Lac-Jérôme, Côte-Nord, Quebec, Canada
- Coordinates: 52.25°N 63.80°W
- Primary inflows: Romaine River
- Primary outflows: Romaine River
- Basin countries: Canada
- Max. length: 34 kilometers (21 mi)
- Max. width: 5.7 kilometers (3.5 mi)
- Surface area: 89 square kilometres (34 sq mi)
- Surface elevation: 485 meters (1,591 ft)

Brûlé Lake (French: Lac Brûlé: Burnt Lake) is a lake in the Côte-Nord region of Quebec, Canada, the eastern shore of which marks the boundary with Labrador (the mainland portion of the province of Newfoundland and Labrador).

== Location ==
Brûlé Lake is in the unorganized territory of Lac-Jérôme in the Minganie Regional County Municipality. The lake lies at an elevation of 485 meters (1,591 ft). Brûlé Lake is a widening of the Romaine River, which flows south into the Jacques-Cartier Strait west of Havre-Saint-Pierre. The lake is 34 kilometres (21 mi) long and 6 kilometres (3.7 mi) wide. It covers an area of nearly 89 square kilometres (34 sq mi). At this point, the Romaine River defines the border between Quebec and Labrador. A map of the ecological regions of Quebec shows the lake in the sub-region 7c-T of the east spruce/lichen subdomain.

== Name ==
The Innu call the lake Upuapuhkau Nipi or Upuâpûhkâu Nipi, meaning "lake whose perimeter burned in the past". It is also called Apuabushkau or Apuabushkash. In the 19th century, it was called Lacs Brûlés, referring to the connected Brûlé, Lavoie and Anderson lakes. On maps of 1898 and 1907 it is shown as "L. Brulé", then on a map of 1911 as "Burnt Lakes", and in 1924 as "Lac Brulé". There are ninety lakes called Lac Brûlé, Brûlés or Brûlée in Quebec.

== Sources ==
- Lac Brûlé (in French), Commission de toponymie du Québec
- Lac Brûlé (in French), Ressources naturelles Canada
- Saucier, J.-P.; Robitaille, A.; Grondin, P.; Bergeron, J.-F.; Gosselin, J. (2011), Les régions écologiques du Québec méridional (PDF) (map), 4 (in French), Ministère des Ressources naturelles et de la Faune, archived from the original (PDF) on 2020-06-19
