= Romaine-2 Generating Station =

- Location within Quebec
- Official name: Centrale de la Romaine-2
- Country: Canada
- Location: Lac-Jérôme, Minganie, Côte-Nord, Quebec
- Coordinates: 50.669722°N 63.226667°W
- Purpose: Hydroelectric
- Owner: Hydro-Québec

Dam and spillways
- Impounds: Romaine River
- Height (foundation): 121 metres (397 ft)
- Height (thalweg): 108 metres (354 ft)

Reservoir
- Surface area: 85.8 square kilometres (33.1 sq mi)

Power Station
- Coordinates: 50.61540°N 63.17598°W
- Operator: Hydro-Québec
- Commission date: 2014
- Installed capacity: 640 MW
- Capacity factor: 0.58
- Annual generation: 3.3 TWh

The Romaine-2 Generating Station (French: Centrale de la Romaine-2) is a 640 MW hydroelectric generating station on the Romaine River in the Côte-Nord region of the province of Quebec, Canada. It is owned and operated by Hydro-Québec.

== Description ==
The Romaine-2 Dam is 90.3 kilometres (56.1 mi) from the river mouth. It is in the unorganized territory of Lac-Jérôme in the Minganie Regional County Municipality. It is 108 metres (354 ft) high, and has a holding capacity of 3,720,000,000 cubic metres (1.31×10^{11} cu ft). It is a concrete gravity dam on a foundation of treated rock. The reservoir area is 85.8 square kilometres (33.1 sq mi). Drawdown from high to low water level is 5 metres (16 ft). The lower part of the Abbé Huard River now forms the northeast arm of the Romaine-2 reservoir.

In addition to the main dam, which includes the spillway, the river is contained by dykes A2, B2 and C2 above the dam, and by dykes D2, E2 and F2 below the dam. Five of the dykes contain asphalt/concrete waterproof cores. The largest is 80 metres (260 ft) high.

The penstock leads from an intake structure just north of Dyke D2 in a southeast direction to the generating station. The water passes through a surge chamber, down conduits to the turbines and out through the tailrace to the river to the east of the station. Water flow is 453 cubic metres per second (16,000 cu ft/s). The station has installed capacity of 640 MW, making it the most powerful of the Romaine complex. The plant provides 3.3 TWh annually, at a utilization factor of 0.58.

== History ==
The dams and generating station are part of a huge hydroelectric complex with four dams that was launched in 2009 under the government of Jean Charest. The overall Romaine project was formally launched by Jean Charest in May 2009. A 150 kilometres (93 mi) road was built to provide access to the four dams. The Murailles camp at 35.7 kilometres (22.2 mi) from the start of the road was built to house up to 2,408 workers on the Romaine 2 and Romaine 1 projects. Construction of Romaine-2 lasted from November 2009 to November 2014. The generating station came into service in 2014. In September 2017 Hydro-Québec had said it had no plans for more dams due to the present surplus of electricity. During the inauguration of Romaine-3 in October 2017, Quebec premier Philippe Couillard confirmed that no more major projects were planned.

== Controversies ==
The company had to negotiate several agreements with the local Innu communities, paying more than CDN$200 million over a 60-year period to compensate for the effects of the dams, roads and electric transmission lines.

There were a number of controversies. In March 2012 Quebec Route 138 was blocked at Maliotenam by the Innu, who were demanding compensation for the power lines on their territory. In June 2015 Route 138 was blocked at Pessamit and Maliotenam, and the access road to the construction site was blocked, by construction workers demanding that more local workers be hired. In July 2015 the road to the site was blocked by the Innu of Natashquan who felt that Hydro-Quebec did not respect the agreement signed in 2008. In March 2016 a court rejected the demand by Innu families of Uashat mak Mani-utenam to stop the project. In November 2016 there was controversy over the waste of wood cut in the reservoirs.

== Sources ==
- Bergeron, Patrice (18 October 2017), "La centrale Romaine-3 inaugurée sur la Côte-Nord", Le Soleil (in French)
- Complexe de la Romaine, Caractérisation des sites de mise bas du caribou (PDF) (maps) (in French), MRN Québec, 2004
- Centrale de la Romaine-2 (in French), Hydro-Québec
- Grenier, Simon (23 March 2012), Barrages à noyau en enrobé à forte teneur en bitume : développement et défis (PDF) (in French), SMC Lavalin
- "Inauguration de la centrale Romaine-3", Ici Radio Canada (in French), 19 October 2017
- Joint Review Panel (February 2009), Romaine Hydroelectric Complex Project (PDF), Ottawa: Canadian Environmental Assessment Agency, Quebec bureau d'audiences publiques sur l'environnement, archived from the original (PDF) on December 21, 2021
- Paul, Mireille (17 April 2009), Rapport d'analyse environnementale pour le projet d'aménagement du complexe hydroélectrique de la rivière Romaine ... par Hydro-Québec (PDF) (in French)
- Poly-Geo Inc. (March 2006), Complexe de la Romaine, Étude de la dynamique sédimentaire (PDF) (in French), Hydro-Québec Équipement
- Romaine-2, Barrage de la (in French), Ministère de l’Environnement et de la Lutte contre les changements climatiques
