= Romaine River =

Romaine River Kanatuahkuiau, Uanaman Hipu, Uepatauekat Shipu, Rivière Romaine
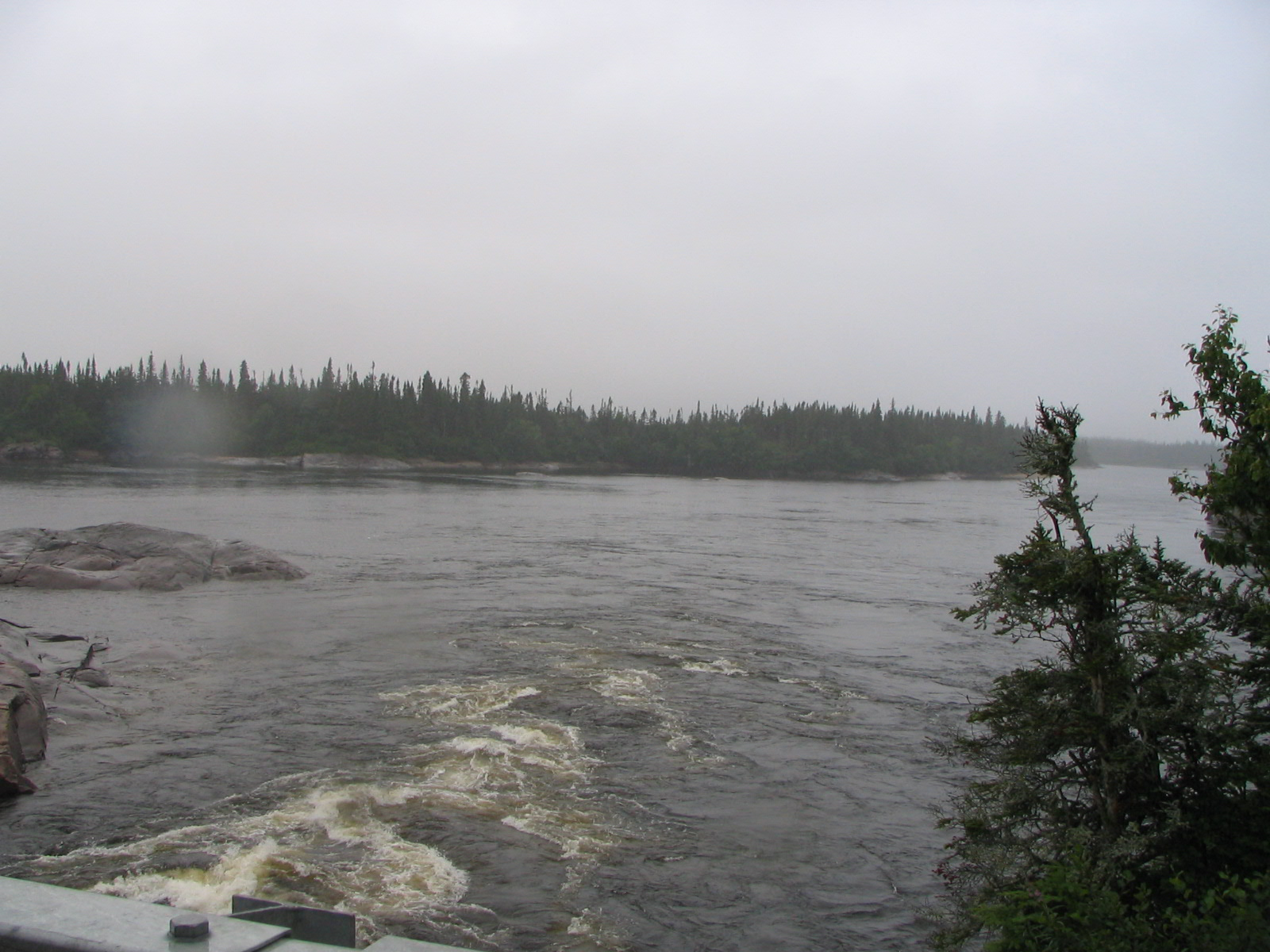
- Near its mouth in the Gulf of St. Lawrence, from the Alexandre-Tanguay bridge, Route 138, Havre-Saint-Pierre

Location
- Country: Canada
- Province: Quebec - Newfoudland and Labrador
- Region: Côte-Nord - Labrador

Physical characteristics
- Source: Unnamed wilderness
  - coordinates: 52°52′20″N 63°36′55″W
  - elevation: 685 m (2,247 ft)
- Mouth: Jacques Cartier Strait in Gulf of St. Lawrence
  - location: About 15 km west of Havre-Saint-Pierre
  - coordinates: 50°18′08″N 63°48′12″W
  - elevation: 0 m (0 ft)
- Length: 496 km (308 mi)
- Basin size: 14,350 km^{2} (5,540 sq mi)
- Discharge
  - average: 340 m^{3}/s (12,000 cu ft/s)

The Romaine River (French: Rivière Romaine), known also as the Kanatuahkuiau, Uanaman Hipu, and Uepatauekat Shipu, is a river in eastern Canada. It flows from north to south, emptying into the Jacques Cartier Strait in the municipality of Havre-Saint-Pierre.

The Romaine is a salmon river located in Minganie RCM, Côte-Nord, and Labrador regions within the provinces of Quebec and Newfoundland and Labrador.

== Geography ==
The Romaine River is 496 kilometres (308 mi) long. It is not to be confused with the Olomane River that is 220 kilometres (140 mi) to the east and which had the same name for many years.

The river is about 518 kilometres (322 mi) long. It has its source on the boundary between the Atlantic and St. Lawrence watersheds, and flows first through a series of lakes, including the Long, Marc, Brûlé, Lavoie, Anderson, and Lozeau. This portion of the river to just past the confluence with Uauahkue Patauan Creek forms the boundary between Quebec and Labrador, then it flows in a mostly southerly direction until a dozen miles from the coast where it takes a sharp turn to the west, flowing through a series of swampy waterlogged small lakes. The Romaine River flows into Jacques Cartier Strait, part of Gulf of St. Lawrence, west of Havre-Saint-Pierre and Mingan Archipelago National Park Reserve.

The river has a Strahler number of 7.

Maps, Romaine River

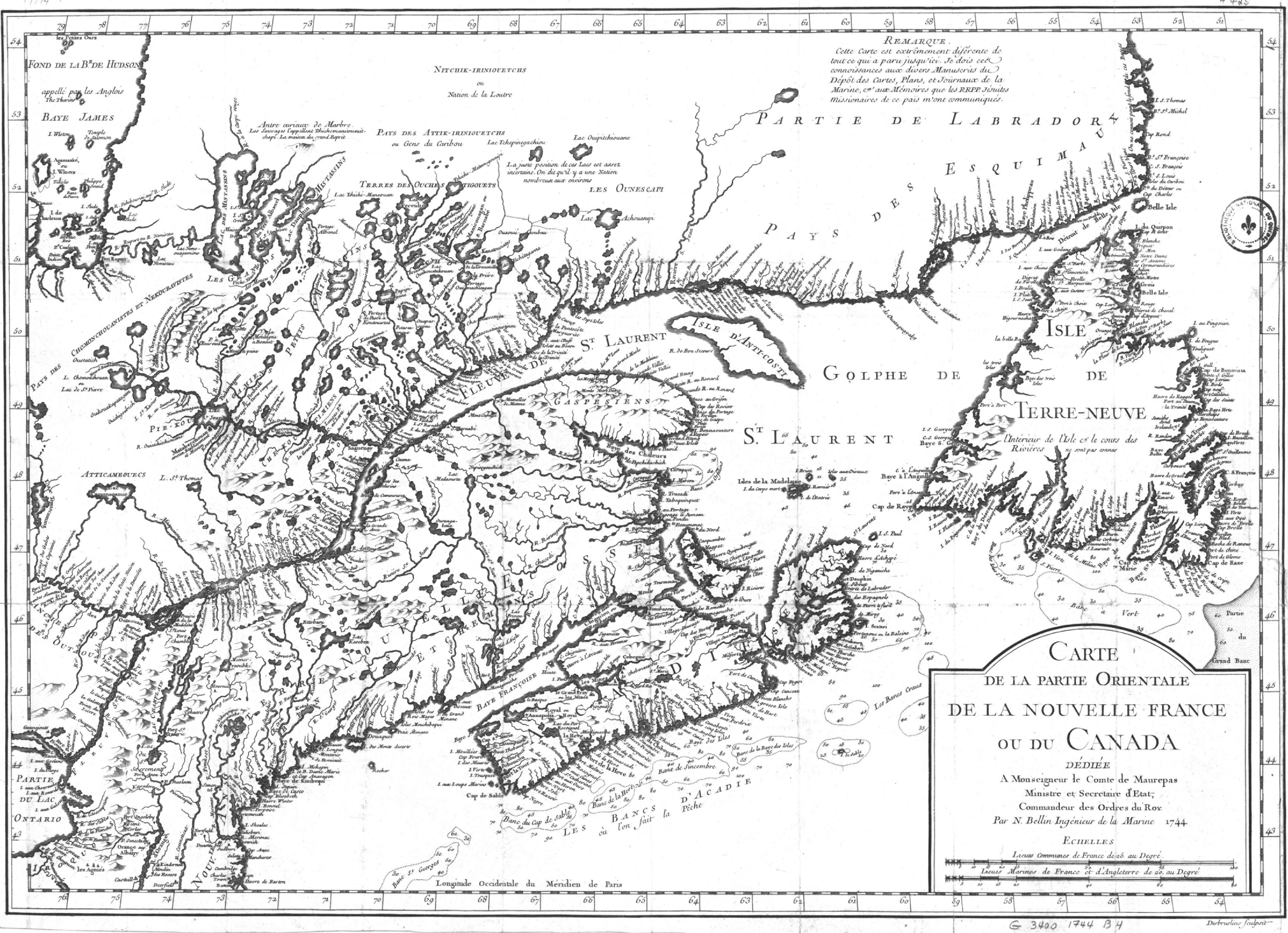
Eastern part of New France or Canada, Jacques Nicolas Bellin, name R. d'eau Ramane, 1744

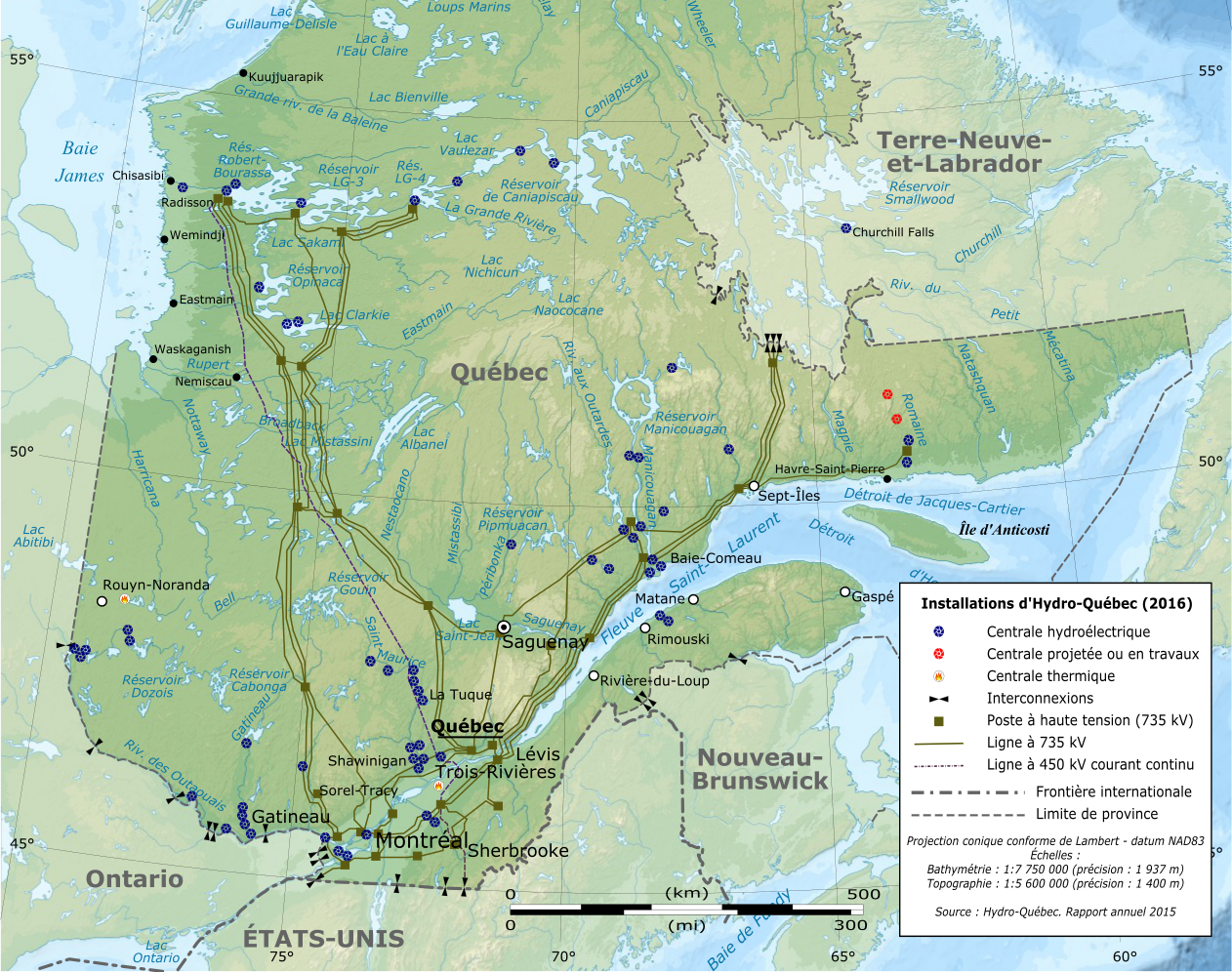
Hydro-Québec, hydroelectric development 2016

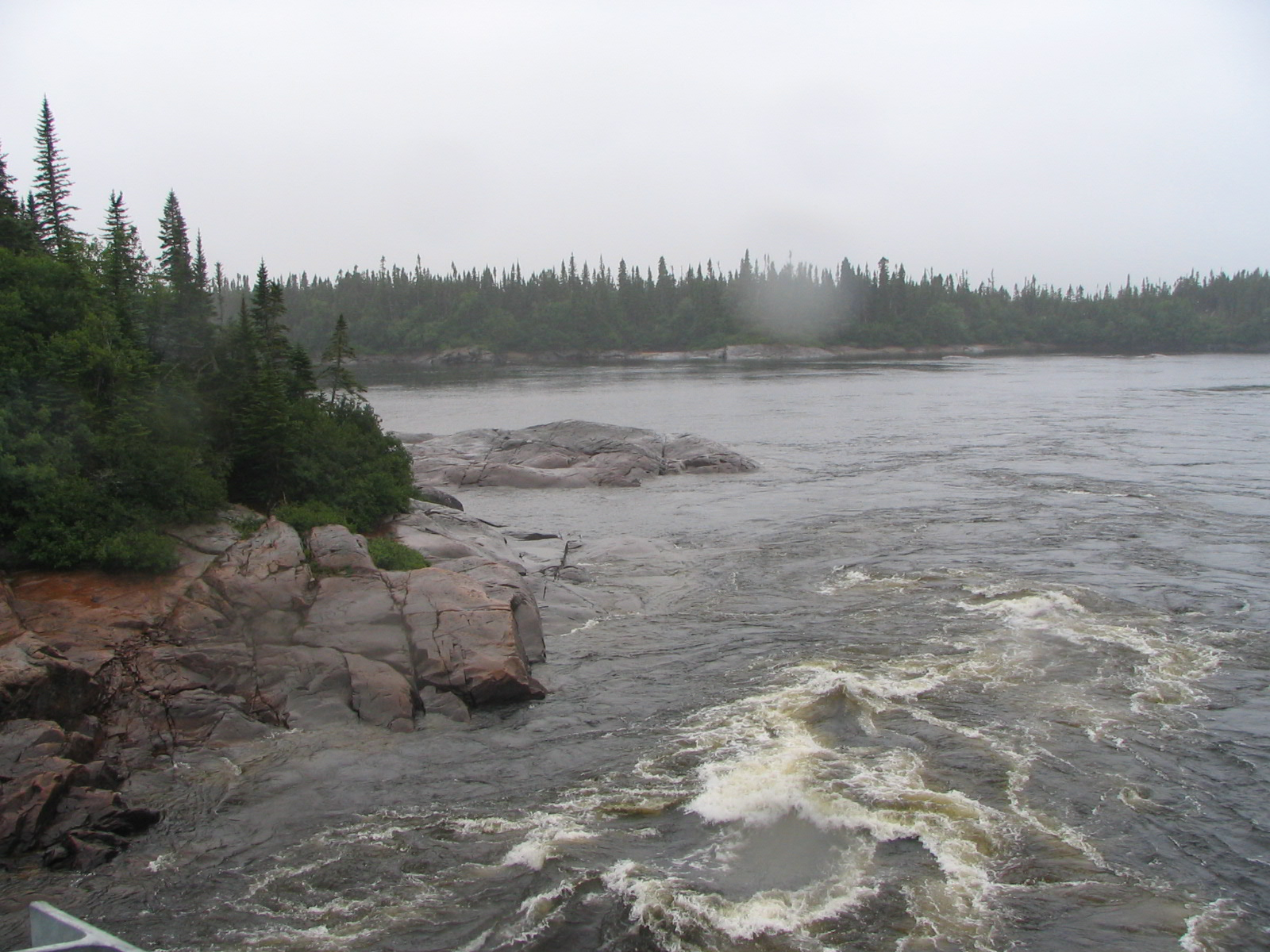
From the Alexandre-Tanguay bridge, reinforced concrete beam bridge #02498 on Route 138

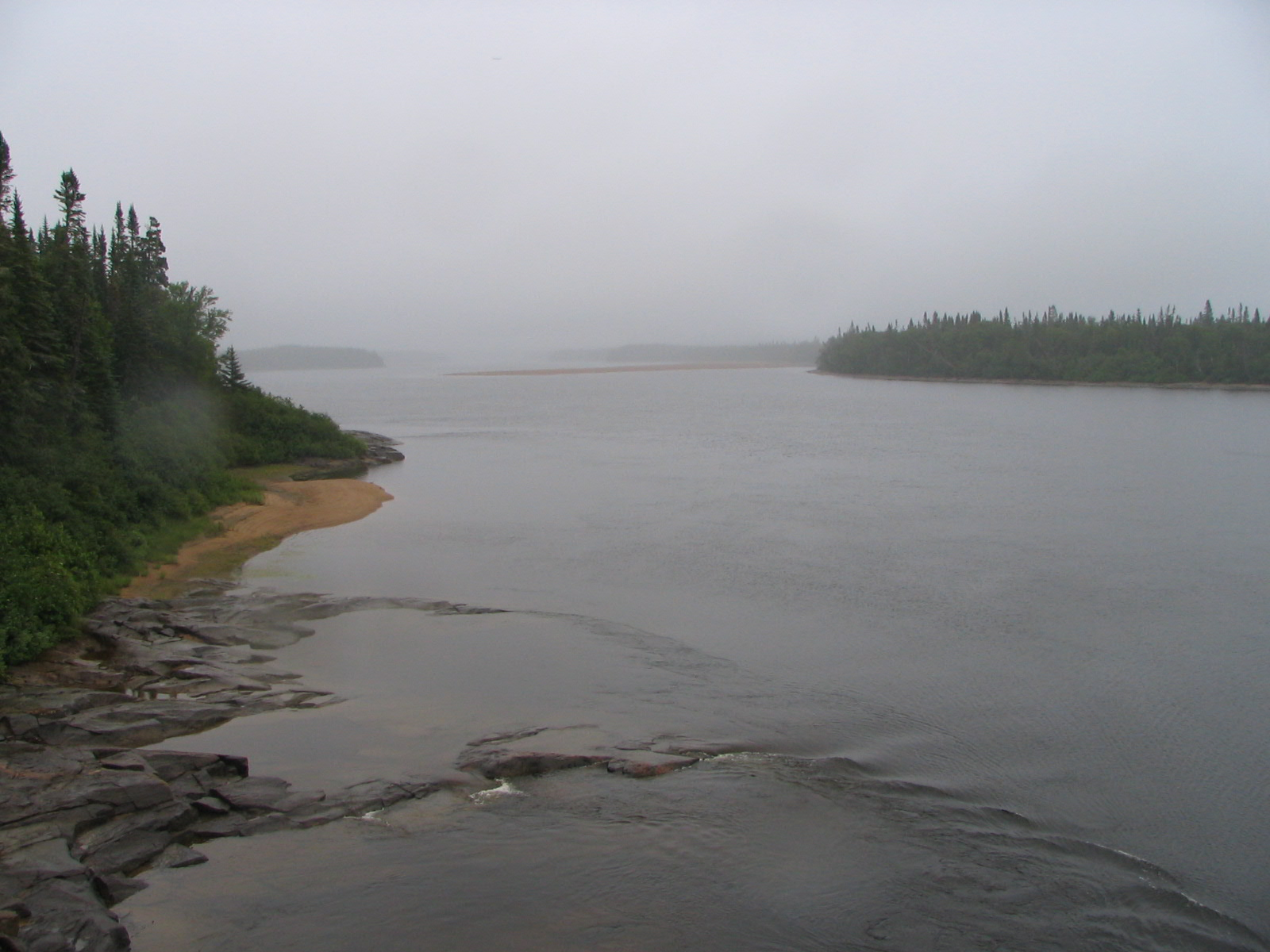
Flows into the Jacques Cartier Strait, in the Gulf of St. Lawrence

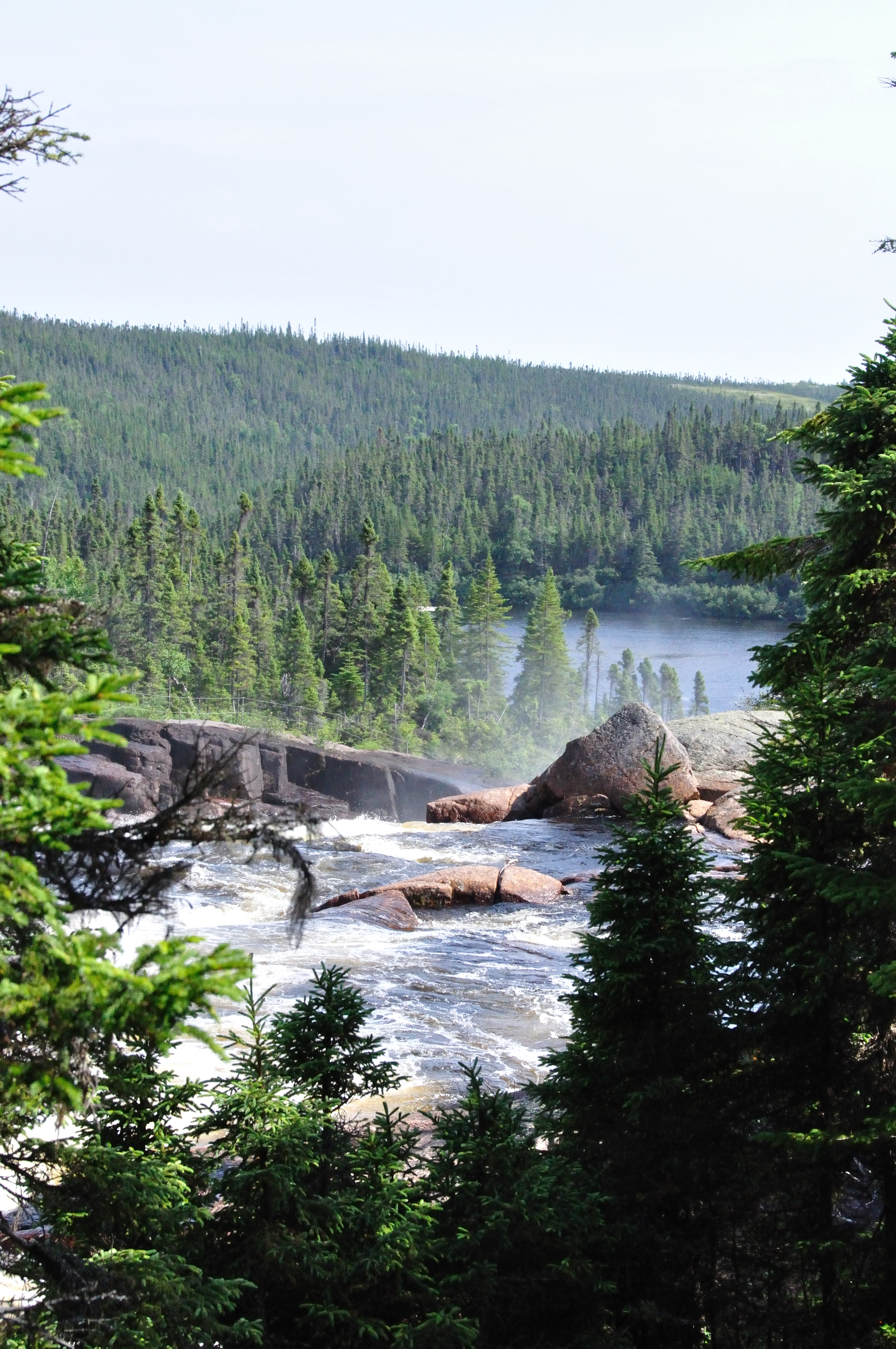
Near Havre-St-Pierre

== Toponymy ==
The name Romaine, in use since the end of the 19th century, is a French adaptation of a word from a First Nations language, Ouraman or Ulaman, as noted by Jean-Baptiste-Louis Franquelin in 1685, while Jacques-Nicolas Bellin wrote Ramane on his map of 1744. It comes from unaman, meaning "vermilion" or "red ochre". Deposits of this material are found on the banks of the Olomane River.

=== Localisation ===
The Romaine River basin covers 14,500 square kilometres (5,600 sq mi). It lies between the basins of the Mingan River to the west and the Rivière à l'Ours (Bear river) to the east. About 15.5% of the basin is in Labrador north of the provincial boundary. In Quebec the basin includes parts of the unorganized territory of Lac-Jérôme and the municipality of Havre-Saint-Pierre. The Mine du lac Tio, an iron and titanium mine, is in the river basin. It also includes the proposed Buttes du Lac aux Sauterelles biodiversity reserve (Katnukamat Biodiversity Reserve).

==== Katnukamat Biodiversity Reserve ====
Réserve de biodiversité Katnukamat is located in the backcountry of the Côte-Nord, it's part of the unorganized territory of Lac-Jérôme in Minganie MRC. The protected area is about 165 km north-northwest of Havre-Saint-Pierre and about 155 km north of the Innu community (Ekuanishit).

=== Tributaries ===
The Romaine River includes several important tributaries: the Puyjalon river at the southern end of the watershed, the Romaine Sud-Est and Abbé-Huard rivers in the southeast, the Garneau river in the center-east, the Touladis river in the center- west, the Sauterelles River to the northwest, the Sénécal River and its network of lakes to the northeast and the Natuaiahu Creek at the northern end.

== Hydroelectric development ==
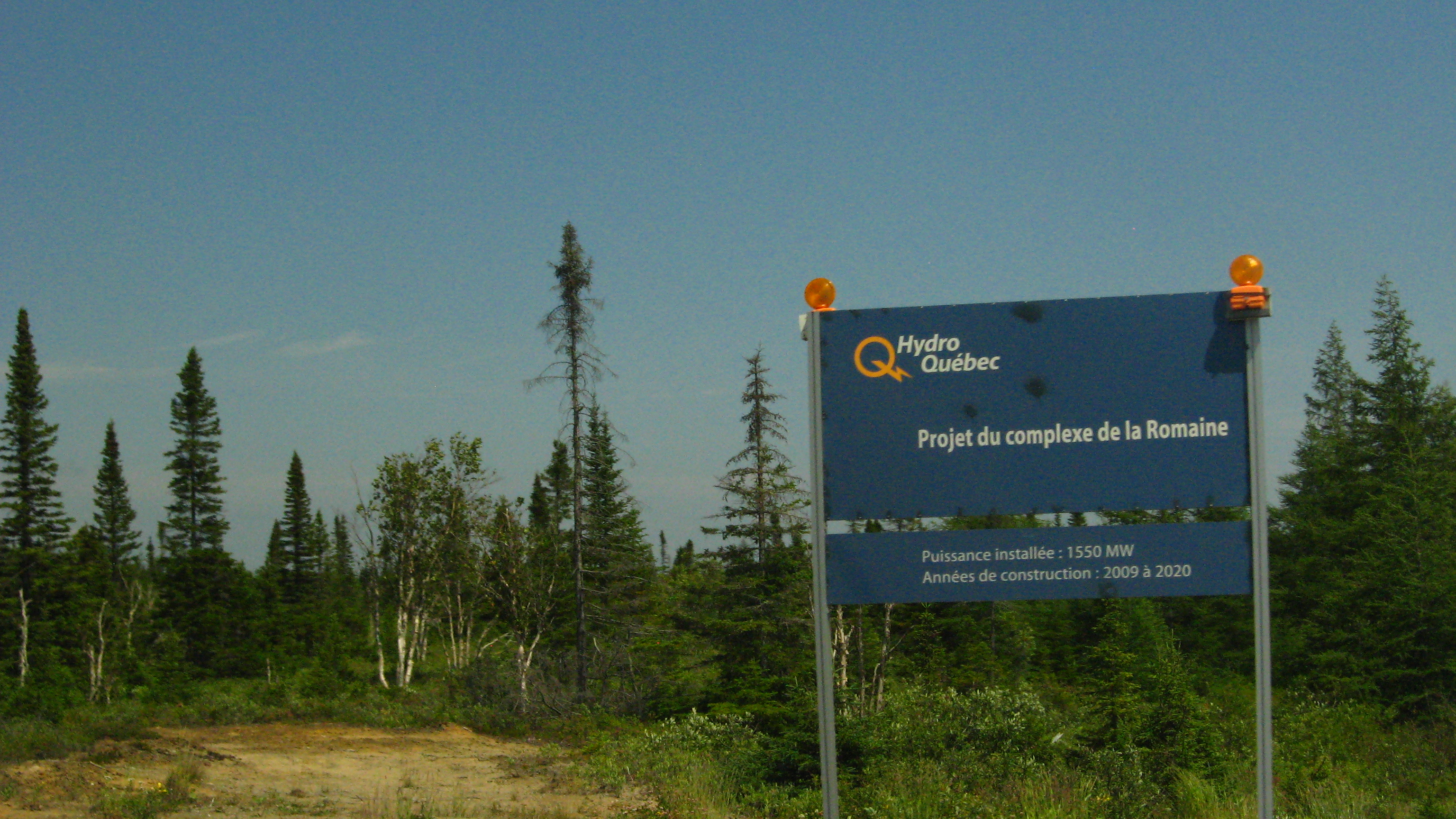
Côte-Nord, Minganie, maybe in Havre-Saint-Pierre, Romaine hydroelectric complex, entrance

In September 2007, a study of 490 pages conducted by Hydro-Québec, submitted to the Minister of Environment and the Fight Against Climate Change highlighted the importance of the work planned for the development of the Complexe de la Romaine. Numerous consultations with the public as well as various discussions with the community and local authorities made it possible to disclose the major environmental issues of the project, namely:

- Economic benefits
- Opening up the territory, crossing the Romaine by snowmobile, hunting, fishing and trapping activities
- Preservation of wildlife resources and their habitat (particularly that of salmon)
- Preservation or the integrity of the Mingan Archipelago National Park Reserve

In December 2007, Hydro-Québec's Geomatics Department published an information document intended for the public concerned by the Romaine Complex project, consisting of 6 detailed maps:

1. Constituent municipalities
2. Sport hunting and fishing
3. Commercial fishing zones
4. Snowmobile trail network downstream from the Romaine-2 site
5. Navigation on the Romaine River, locations of rapids, weirs, waterfall and portages
6. Typical landscapes

The Romaine River was developed by Hydro-Québec for hydro-electric power generation. Construction started in 2009 on a new hydroelectric plant, along with four rock-filled dams and a 150 kilometres (93 mi) long access road, that entered into commercial operation in 2022 at a total cost of C$7.4 billion.Called "the biggest construction project in Canada", the project created on average 975 jobs per year, and created some C$5.5 billion in economic spinoffs.

The final project includes four new power plants with a total installed capacity of more than 1550 MW and an average annual production of 8.0 TWh.

This project was controversial however, as the cost of electricity production may have been higher than the price at which the electricity will be sold, as shown in a 2010 documentary called "Chercher le courant" ("Seeking The Current") by Nicolas Boisclair and Alexis de Gheldère. The film argues that the Romaine project is unnecessary, unprofitable, and ecologically destructive. It was also opposed by the Fondation Rivières.

Name	Location (km from mouth)	Design flow (m^{3}/s)	Capacity (MW)	Units	Head (m)	Est. completion year	Reservoir	Reservoir size (km^{2})	Geographic coord.
Romaine-1	52.5	485	270	2	61	2016	Romaine-1 Reservoir	12	50°23′01″N 63°15′37″W
Romaine-2	90.4	453	640	2	151	2014	Romaine-2 Reservoir	83	50°37′28″N 63°11′34″W
Romaine-3	158.6	372	395	2	116	2017	Romaine-3 Reservoir	38	51°06′52″N 63°24′00″W
Romaine-4	192.0	307	245	2	93	2022	Romaine-4 Reservoir	140	51°20′52″N 63°29′12″W

== Fauna ==
The Romaine River is home to the Atlantic salmon that swims 52 kilometres (32 mi) upstream as far as the Grande Chute. Other fish species are Brook trout (found along the river's entire length), Lake trout (in most lakes), and Landlocked salmon (upstream of Grande Chute).

- Salvelinus fontinalis. — Omble de Fontaine. — (Brook trout).
- Salvelinus namaycush. — Touladi. — (Lake trout, Mackinaw, Togue, Gray trout, Namaycush).
- Salmo salar. — Saumon atlantique, Saumon ouananiche. — (Atlantic salmon, Landlocked salmon).

== See also ==
- La Romaine, Quebec
- French Wikipedia article on Hydro-Quebec's Projet de la Romaine
