= Jacques Cartier Strait =

Strait Jacques Cartier
- Détroit de Jacques-Cartier
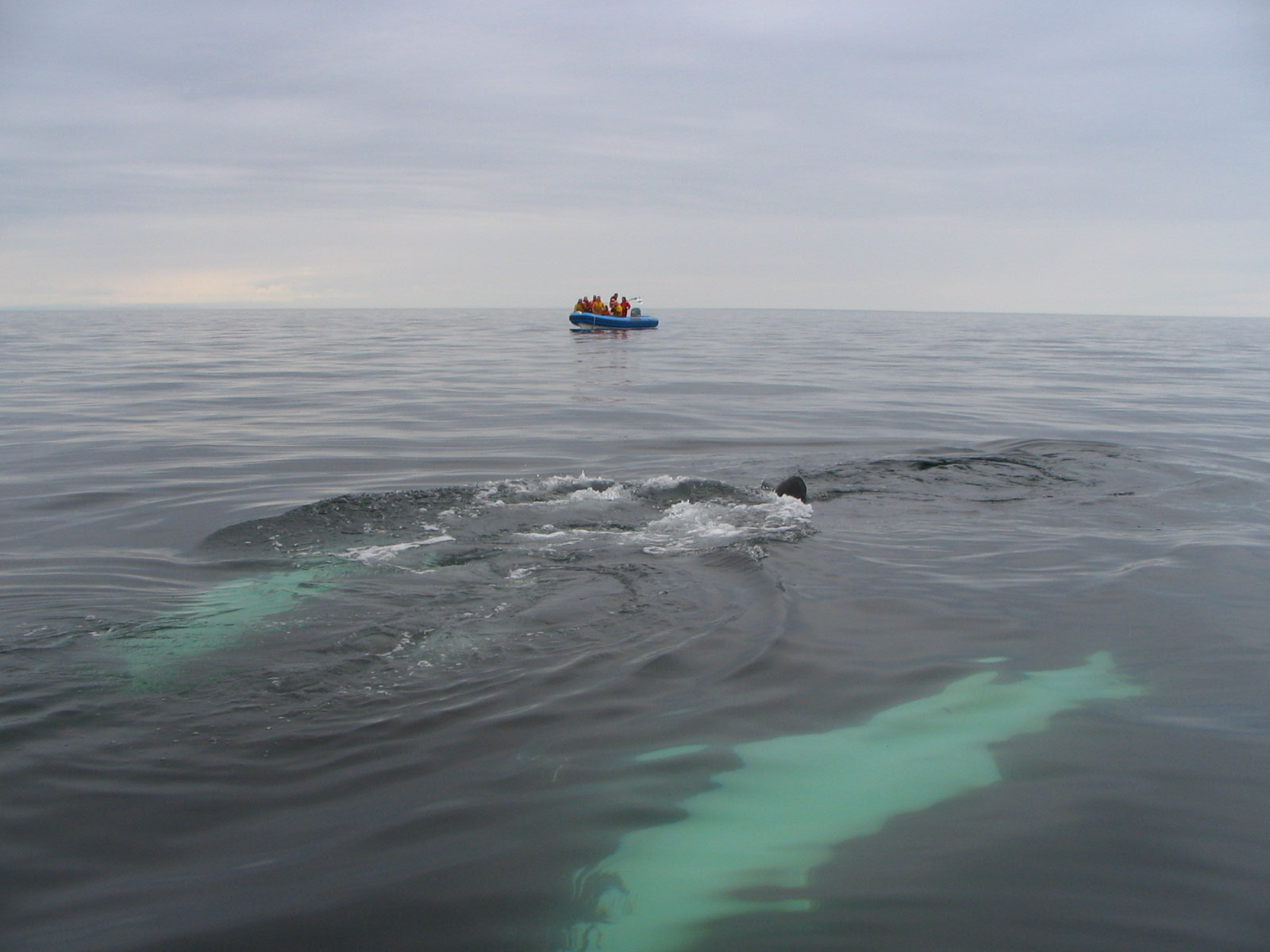
- North of Anticosti Island
- Interactive map of Strait Jacques Cartier
- Location: Gulf of St. Lawrence
- Coordinates: 49°57′30″N 62°47′25″W
- Basin countries: Quebec, Canada
- Max. length: 40 km (25 mi)

The Jacques Cartier Strait (French: Détroit de Jacques-Cartier, pronounced [detʁwa də ʒak kaʁtje]) is an arm of the sea located in the Gulf of St. Lawrence, between the shore of Côte-Nord region and the North of Anticosti Island, in Quebec, Canada.

== Toponymy ==
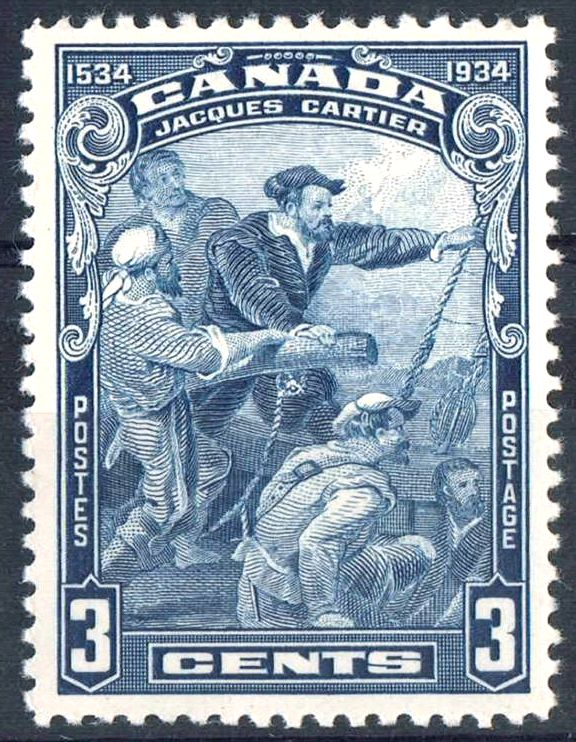
Jacques Cartier (circa 1491-1557), Canada Post 3 cents stamp 1934, designed by George Arthur Gundersen (1910-1975)

The other arm of the sea is the Honguedo Strait located on the south side of Anticosti Island and the Gaspé Peninsula.

The Jacques Cartier Strait is approximately 40 kilometres (25 mi) wide.

Jacques Cartier Strait was officially named for the French explorer Jacques Cartier in 1934 by the Geographic Board of Quebec to commemorate the 400th anniversary of his arrival in North America. Prior to this, it was also known as Détroit Saint-Pierre (by Cartier himself on August 1, 1534, the day of St. Peter), Labrador Channel (until 1815), and Mingan Passage.

Jacques Cartier Strait - Gulf of St. Lawrence

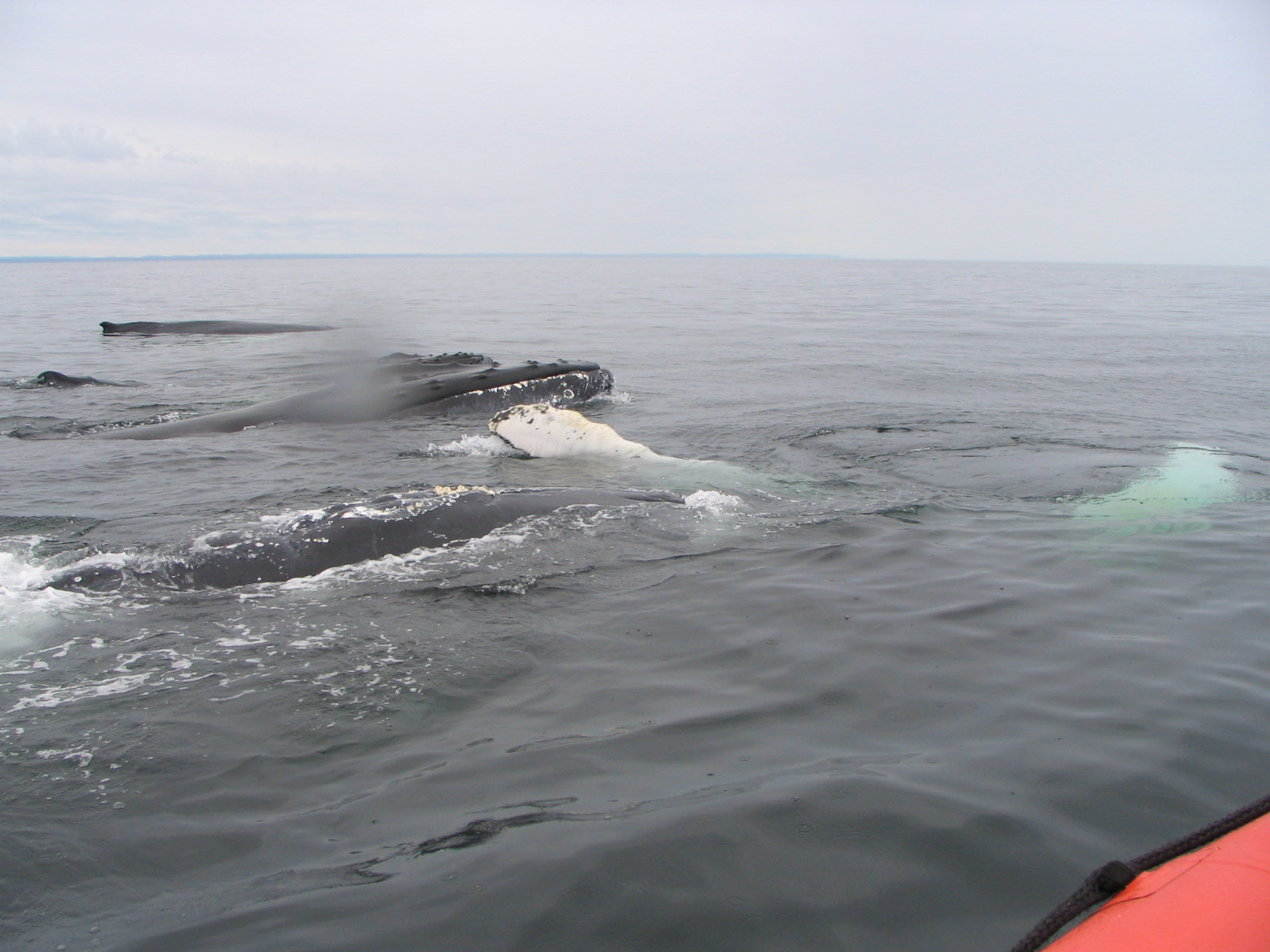
Humpback whales, females and calves, North of Antiscosti Island

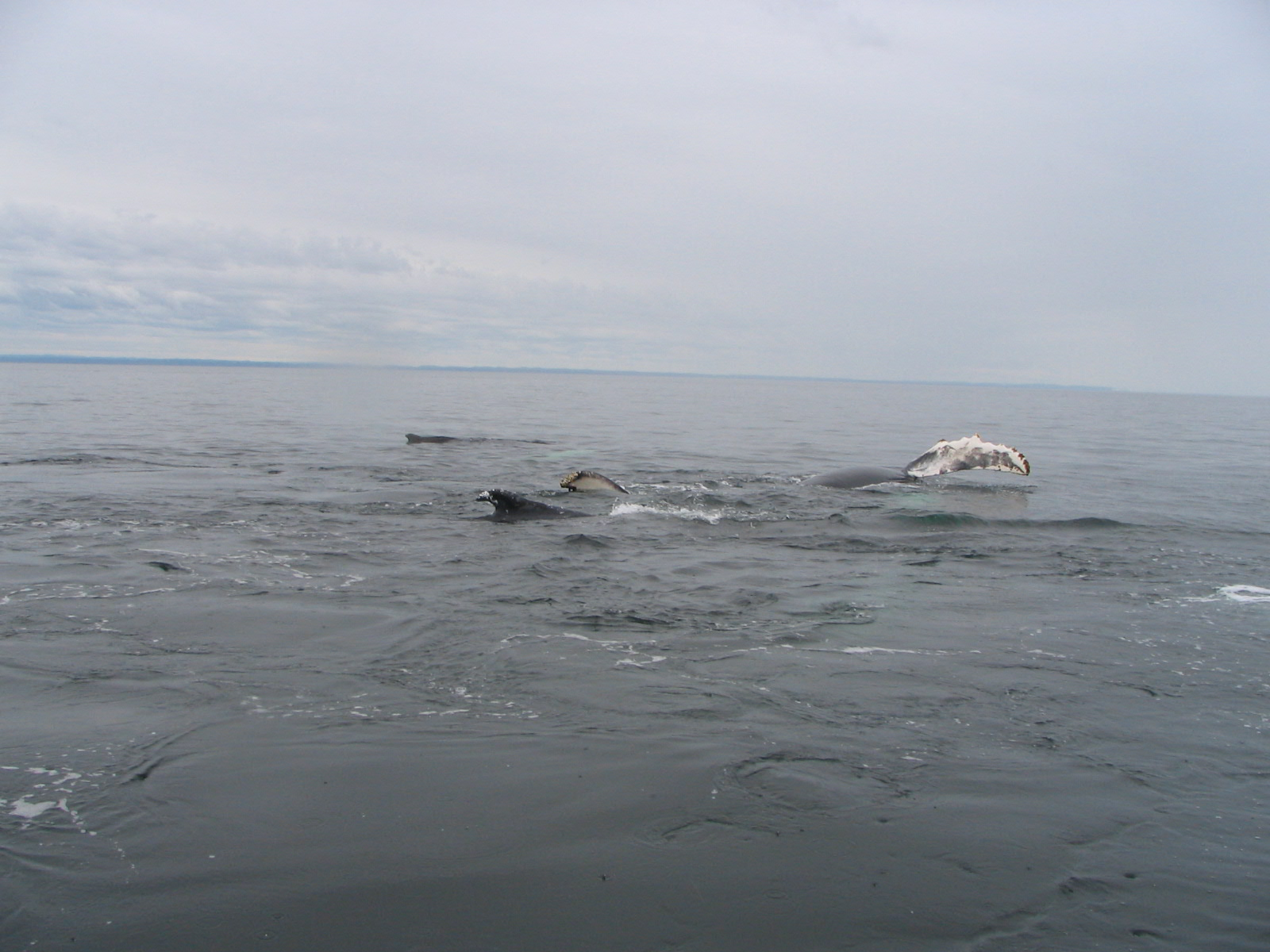
Humpback whales, dorsals, pectoral fins, North of Antiscosti Island

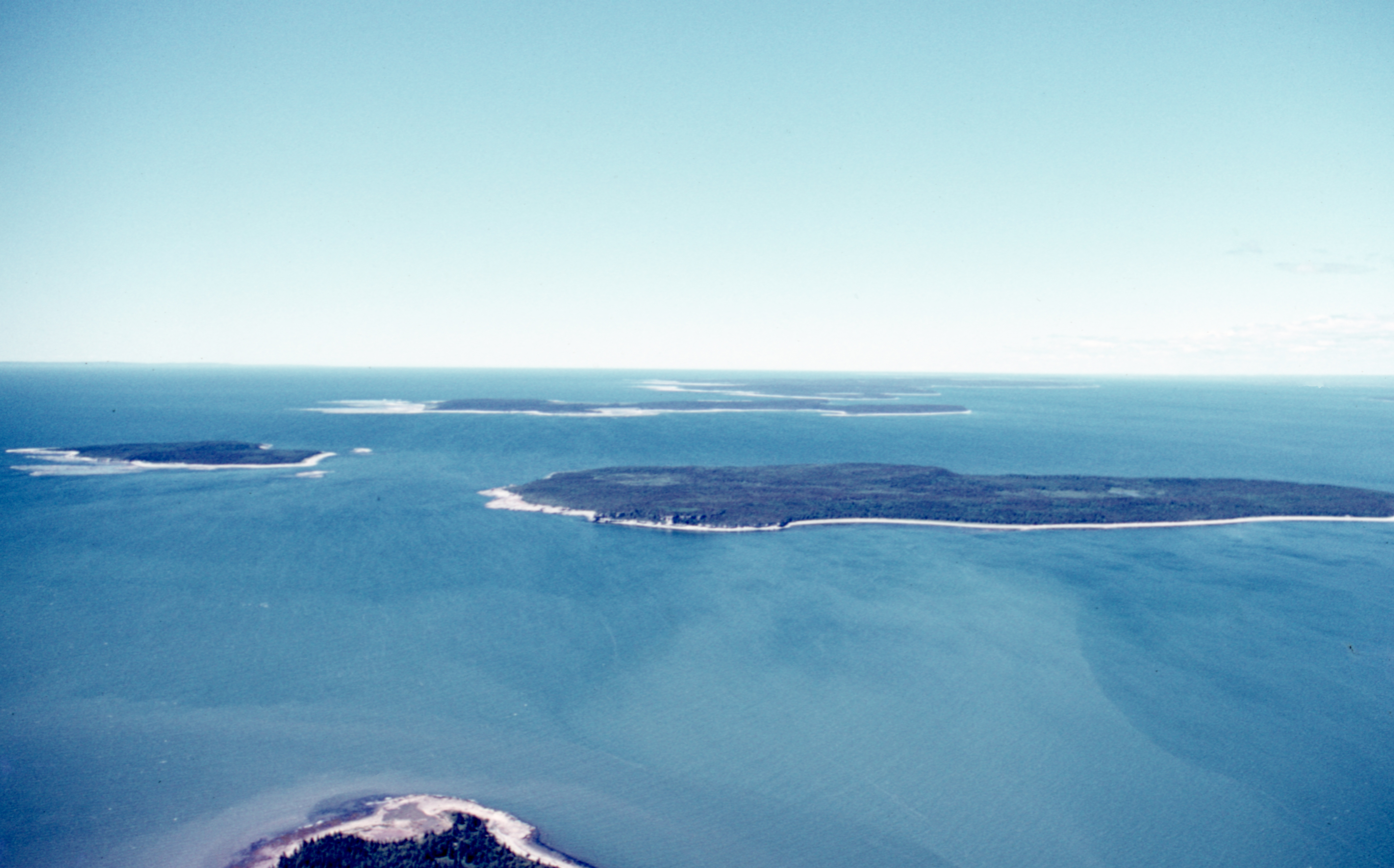
Mingan Archipelago National Park Reserve from a seaplane
