= Romaine-3 Generating Station =

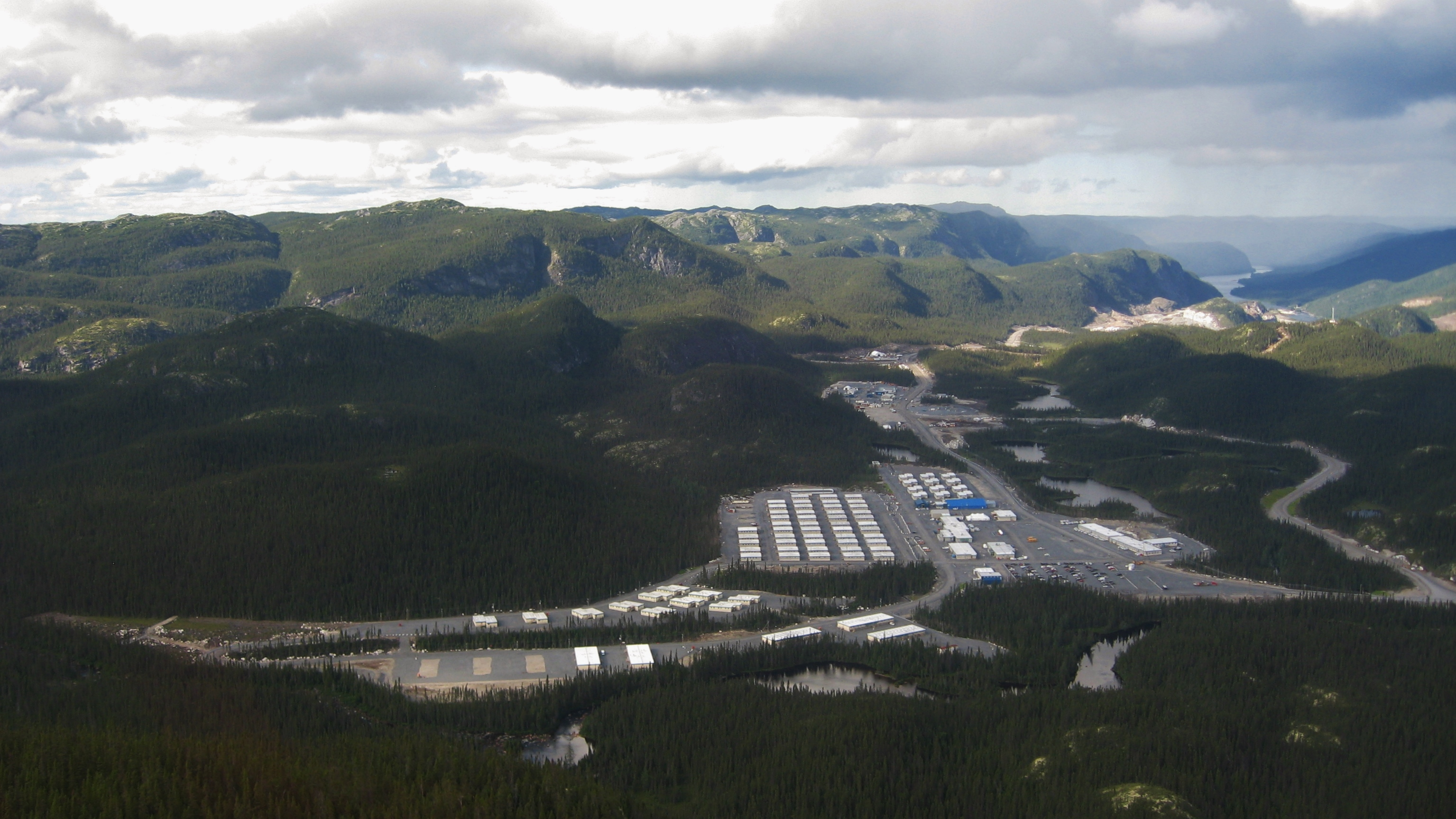
- Mista Camp, Romaine-3

- Location within Quebec
- Official name: Centrale de la Romaine-3
- Country: Canada
- Location: Lac-Jérôme, Minganie, Côte-Nord, Quebec
- Coordinates: 51.130860°N 63.413634°W
- Purpose: Hydroelectric
- Owner: Hydro-Québec

Dam and spillways
- Impounds: Romaine River
- Height (foundation): 95 metres (312 ft)
- Height (thalweg): 92.8 metres (304 ft)
- Length: 415 metres (1,362 ft)

Reservoir
- Surface area: 38.6 square kilometres (14.9 sq mi)

Power Station
- Coordinates: 51.114205°N 63.400275°W
- Operator: Hydro-Québec
- Commission date: 2017
- Turbines: 2 Francis vertical
- Installed capacity: 395 MW
- Capacity factor: 0.58
- Annual generation: 2 TWh

The Romaine-3 Generating Station (French: Centrale de la Romaine-3) is a 395 MW hydroelectric generating station on the Romaine River that is one of four generating stations in the La Romaine Hydroelectric Complex in the Côte-Nord region of the province of Quebec, Canada. It is owned and operated by Hydro-Québec.

== Description ==
The dams and generating station are part of a huge hydroelectric complex with four dams that was launched in 2009 under the government of Jean Charest. At maximum level, the Romaine-3 reservoir area is 38.6 square kilometres (14.9 sq mi). The drawdown level is 13 metres (43 ft). Surface altitude varies from 352.8 to 365.8 metres (1,157 to 1,200 ft). The main dam is the second highest in the Romaine complex after Romaine-2.

There are two dams, both completed in 2017. The main retaining dam is 95 metres (312 ft) high, with thalweg height of 92.8 metres (304 ft) and length of 415 metres (1,362 ft). The holding capacity is 1,878,000,000 cubic metres (6.63×10^{10} cu ft). It is a rockfill dam with zoned core, built on treated rock. The smaller B3 dyke is west of the main dam and contains the spillway. It is 30 metres (98 ft) high, with thalweg height 27.8 metres (91 ft) and length of 257.6 metres (845 ft). The holding capacity is 960,000,000 cubic metres (3.4×10^{10} cu ft). It is a concrete gravity dam built on treated rock.

The main dam is between PK158 and PK159 on the river. The spillway discharges into the Romaine River at PK158. A gallery leads from a point southeast of the main dam to the generating station south of the dam at PK155 on the river. A total of about 2.4 kilometres (1.5 mi) of tunnels were excavated, including the headrace tunnel, penstocks and a surge chamber. The headrace tunnel is 1,662 metres (5,453 ft) long, 16 metres (52 ft) wide and 12 metres (39 ft) high. The generating station discharges into the head of the Romaine-2 reservoir, at a maximum elevation of 243.8 metres (800 ft). The generating station has installed capacity of 395 MW. Average annual energy production is 2 TWh, with a capacity factor of 0.58.

The argument in favor for the construction of the La Romaine hydroelectric complex revolves around the positive economic and climate impacts that the project promised.

It was estimated that the project would bring about numerous economic benefits to the local population and to the large region as a whole. At the local level, the project was expected to create 975 jobs every single year throughout the project’s lifetime. At the regional level, business advocates for the project stated that La Romaine would ensure the competitiveness of businesses and industries alike for the short, medium, and long term future. They argued that the project would ensure a reliable energy supply and surplus that would allow for industry growth, all at a competitive electricity price. Currently, the plant has the lowest electricity rates in North America (Plante, 2023). Hydro-Québec estimated that the economic spinoff created by the project would be around 3.5 billion for the entirety of Québec and 1.3 billion for the Côte-Nord region. Additionally, advocates highlighted the significant contributions that hydroelectric power generates for the Generations Fund in form of royalties. This fund benefits Québec by helping the province reduce debt and address social issues.

Hydroelectric power, like other forms of renewable energy, has a much lower greenhouse gas emissions than other sources of electricity. This was a prominent argument made by advocates who were in favor of the construction of the complex. The complex would create 8 TWh of electricity yearly, which would be enough to power 470,000 households. Hydroelectric power can be directly attributed to a reduction of greenhouse gas emissions in the electricity sector as hydroelectricity is the main source of energy for the residential, industrial and commercial sectors in Québec.

== History ==
The overall Romaine project was formally launched by Jean Charest in May 2009. A 150 kilometres (93 mi) road was built to provide access to the four dams. The Mista camp was built at PK 118 on this road to accommodate the workers assigned to the Romaine 3 and Romaine 4 facilities. It could accommodate up to 1,744 people.

In July 2013 Alstom was awarded a contract to supply, install and commission two 200MW vertical Francis turbine-generator units, with butterfly valves and regulation systems, at Romaine-3. In September 2013 Hydro-Quebec called for bids to construct the dam and embankment B3, excavate the spillway and intake channel, and undertake other related work. A crushing works was built in 2014–2015 to make gravel for use in the Romaine 3 concrete. In March 2015 a shovel operator died in the Romaine-3 site after the ice of a drainage channel broke under his vehicle. In a separate incident, 4 workers were killed in an accident.

The Romaine-3 Generating Station came into service in 2017. It was inaugurated by Quebec premier Philippe Couillard and Hydro-Québec President Eric Martel in a ceremony on 19 October 2017. The plant was to be connected to the Quebec electrical grid in phases. In September 2017 Hydro-Québec had said it had no plans for more dams due to the present surplus of electricity. Couillard confirmed that no more major projects were planned. All parts of the La Romaine Hydroelectric Complex were successfully completed, and Hydro-Québec inaugurated the Complex in October 2023.

== Environmental Impacts ==
A 2009 joint review panel on the La Romaine Hydroelectric Complex highlighted the main areas of the environment that would be adversely affected by the creation of the dam and the subsequent water reservoirs would be the Woodland caribou population, birdlife, and fish populations.

As a consequence of the diminishing available habitats resulting from the establishment of water reservoirs and extensive logging practices within the region, there is a projected decline foreseen in the population of Woodland caribou. This anticipated decline is intricately linked to the sensitivity exhibited by caribou in their migratory behaviors towards various human-induced activities such as construction undertakings, heightened vehicular traffic, the existence of substantial structures, and amplified levels of ambient noise. The unfortunate reduction in the number of Woodland caribou is poised to negatively impact the longstanding and integral traditional activities practiced by the Innu communities in the affected area. It's noteworthy that in 2003, the Innu of Ekuanitshit petitioned the federal courts, seeking intervention to halt the proposed construction of a hydroelectric dam on the Romaine River (White, 2012). Their plea was rooted in profound concerns regarding the potential detrimental effects that the hydroelectric dam project could inflict upon the Woodland caribou population, recognizing the vital interdependence between the caribou's well-being and their own cultural practices and heritage.

In the joint review panel, multiple organizations came forward to voice concerns for the birdlife that lives in the affected area of the La Romaine Hydroelectric Complex. The species of concern included the Barrow’s Goldeneye, Sternidae, Boreal Pewee, Rusty Blackbird, and Kirtland’s Warbler. There were also concerns that the transmission lines connected to the plant may interfere with migrating birds. Additionally, there were allegations that Hydro-Québec had not considered the possible effects that the hydroelectric plant would have on specific species that were already experiencing population decline. Overall, there was much concern over the loss of habitat due to logging and reservoir creation. Most organizations called for additional studies on the effects on birdlife in the region to be completed before the project moved forward in order to determine if additional mitigation or compensation methods would be necessary.

Many concerns were raised about the hydroelectric complex’s potential negative impact on the size of fish populations and on the genetic diversity of fish populations, specifically salmon populations, in the Romaine River. These concerns were rooted in observations made at other rivers that hydroelectric dams have been built on. Environmental and habitat transformations caused by human activity, such as the construction of a hydroelectric dam, are recognized as the biggest reason for population decline and species loss in freshwater systems. Hydroelectric dams in the Columbia River Basin were the main cause of juvenile fish mortality as the fish attempted to migrate downstream. The same study found that mitigation efforts benefited other fish species, but not salmon. It was questioned whether the proposed mitigation strategies would be effective enough to alleviate the effects of the dams on fish populations. As of October 2023, mitigation efforts included the seeding of Atlantic salmon, lake trout and landlocked salmon.

Another area of possible concern is bioaccumulation of the neurotoxin methylmercury. Bioaccumulation occurs when chemicals build up in an organism because they are taken in faster than they are expelled. These chemicals get into the organism either from the environment (like soil, water, or air) or through what the organism eats. When soil is flooded, the breaking down of labile organic carbon and subsequent changes in geochemical conditions causes the production of methylmercury (MeHg). In the newly created reservoirs of other Canadian hydroelectric dams, methylmercury levels have seen a 2.6-2.8 times increase in concentration. Innu communities regularly engage in traditional hunting practices of the local wildlife. However, this may cause biomagnification, exposing them to harmful levels of methylmercury. A study on the bioaccumulation of methylmercury noted the following: “In northern indigenous populations, increased MeHg exposure has been significantly associated with cardiovascular risk factors for adults such as increased resting heart rate and heart rate variability, as well as increased incidence of attention deficit/hyperactivity disorder (ADHD) among children with high prenatal exposures. Acute MeHg toxicity is associated with widespread neurological abnormalities, paresthesia and ataxia.”

== Controversies ==
The primary controversy surrounding the La Romaine Hydroelectric Complex predominantly revolves around its impact on the Innu tribal group. The construction of the complex and its associated infrastructure has directly encroached upon the traditional lands of the Innu people. Specifically, the Ekuanitshit and Nutashkuan communities stand to face the most adverse consequences resulting from the implementation of this project. Over the span of thousands of years, the Innu have established their livelihood through the time-honored practice of fishing for char, eel, brook trout, and whitefish in the upper reaches of the Romaine River. Additionally, during the summer seasons, they have historically harvested salmon from the pools downstream of the Grandes Chutes, sustaining their cultural practices and heritage. Importantly, the local Innu communities exhibit diverse perspectives regarding the merits of the project, lacking consensus on its potential outcomes and effects within their communities. This divergence of opinions further complicates the resolution of the ongoing debate surrounding the La Romaine Hydroelectric Complex.

Some community members view the project as an opportunity to benefit from the injection of money into the area, allowing their communities to combat the chronic poverty and unemployment on the reserves. The project promised to create an average of 975 jobs each year over the lifetime of the project. Hydro-Québec had to negotiate several agreements of consent with the local Innu communities, paying more than CDN$200 million over a 60-year period to compensate for the effects of the dams, roads and electric transmission lines. Through these agreements, individual communities received between 14.5 and 75 million CDN.

However, several Innu communities elected to not accept the compensation packages. Others are not able to come to terms with the destruction of their ancestral lands fearing that their history and culture could be washed away forever. An investigation and public hearing on the project in 2009 noted an elder Ekuanitshit member’s feeling on the project: “If the hydroelectric development project goes ahead today, the territory that was our beautiful land will be flooded. It is also there that I was born. It is therefore obvious that that is what we will lose, those rights—our land will be flooded. Things will never be the same because the land is our identity.”

In addition to the Innu communities, Hydro-Québec reached agreements of compensation with six local Québécois communities who would also be displaced by the hydroelectric project. These agreements are estimated to be worth more than $700 million CDN.

These concerns came to a head a number of times throughout the years, causing plenty of controversies. In March 2012 Quebec Route 138 was blocked at Maliotenam by the Innu, who were demanding compensation for the power lines on their territory. In June 2015 Route 138 was blocked at Pessamit and Maliotenam, and the access road to the construction site was blocked, by construction workers demanding that more local workers be hired. At the time, there were about 2000 workers employed at the project. Out of the 2000 workers, only 170 were Québécois and 144 were members of the Innu community. The work spaces of the project served as a place of conflict. There was an absence of meaningful intercultural relationships due to language barriers and separation of different trades, leading to Innu workers feeling as though they were experiencing discrimination, intimidation, and even racism. Of the Innu’s that were employed, almost all of them worked in the lowest paying, bottom rung jobs. Additionally, there was a high turnover rate among the Innu workers as the work culture of strict hierarchy and rigid routine directly clashed with Innu culture of flexibility and community support. All of these issues lead to many Innu workers experiencing loneliness, isolation, psychological distress, and even falling into alcoholism and drug addiction. In July 2015 the road to the site was blocked by the Innu of Natashquan who felt that Hydro-Quebec did not respect the agreement signed in 2008. In March 2016 a court rejected the demand by Innu families of Uashat mak Mani-utenam to stop the project. In November 2016 there was controversy over the waste of wood cut in the reservoirs.

== Sources ==
- Bergeron, Patrice (18 October 2017), "La centrale Romaine-3 inaugurée sur la Côte-Nord", Le Soleil (in French)
- Capkun, Anthony (31 July 2013), "Alstom supplying turbine-generator units for Hydro-Quebec's La Romaine 3", Electrical Business
- Centrale de la Romaine-3 (in French), Hydro-Québec
- Crushing works : Romaine-3 hydroelectric project, Groupe Gilbert, 26 June 2017
- "Hydro-Quebec seeks bids to build dam for 395-MW Romaine 3 hydroelectric project", Hydro Review, 24 September 2013
- "Inauguration de la centrale Romaine-3", Ici Radio Canada (in French), 19 October 2017
- Joint Review Panel (February 2009), Romaine Hydroelectric Complex Project (PDF), Ottawa: Canadian Environmental Assessment Agency, Quebec bureau d'audiences publiques sur l'environnement, archived from the original (PDF) on December 21, 2021
- La Romaine-3, Headrace Excavation, EBC Inc.
- Paul, Mireille (17 April 2009), Rapport d'analyse environnementale pour le projet d'aménagement du complexe hydroélectrique de la rivière Romaine ... par Hydro-Québec (PDF) (in French)
- Romaine-3, Barrage de la, X2137423 (in French), Ministère de l’Environnement et de la Lutte contre les changements climatiques
- Romaine-3, Barrage de la, X2137424 (in French), Ministère de l’Environnement et de la Lutte contre les changements climatiques
