= Gulf of St. Lawrence =

Outlet of the Great Lakes into the Atlantic

- French: Golfe du Saint-Laurent
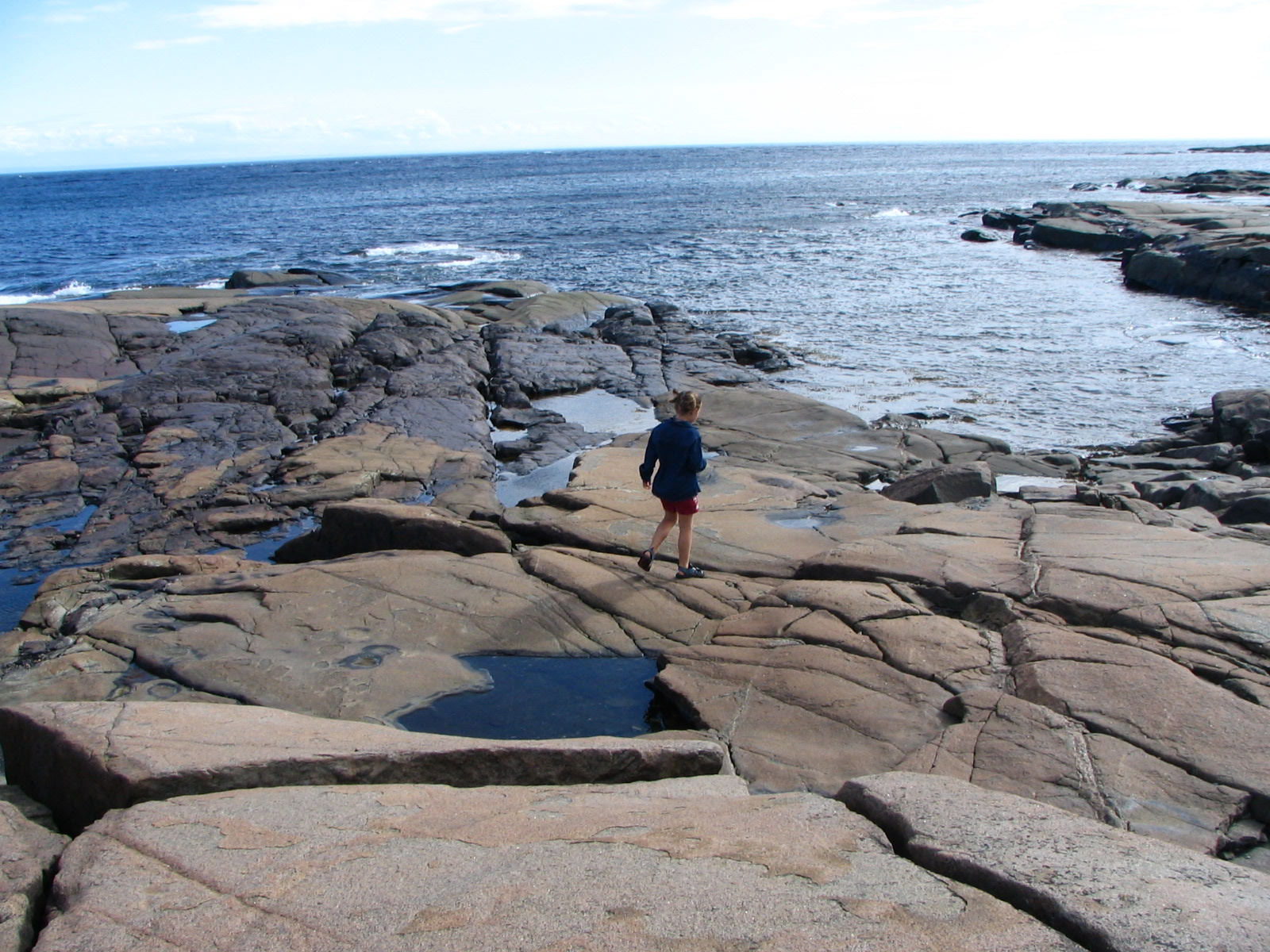
- Canadian Shield bedrock, on the site of Pointe-des-Monts hamlet Lighthouse
- Interactive map of Gulf of St. Lawrence
- Bathymetry of the Gulf of St. Lawrence
- Coordinates: 48°36′N 61°24′W
- Type: Gulf
- Basin countries: Canada; Saint Pierre and Miquelon (France)
- Surface area: 226,000 km^{2} (87,000 sq mi)
- Average depth: 152 m (499 ft)
- Max. depth: 530 m (1,740 ft)
- Water volume: 34,500 km^{3} (8,300 cu mi)

The Gulf of St. Lawrence connects the Great Lakes to the Atlantic Ocean via the St. Lawrence River. The gulf fringes the shores of the provinces of Quebec, New Brunswick, Nova Scotia, Prince Edward Island, Newfoundland and Labrador, in Canada, plus the islands Saint-Pierre and Miquelon, possessions of France, in North America.

== Geography ==
=== Extent ===
The Gulf of St. Lawrence is bounded on the north by the Labrador Peninsula and Quebec, on the east by Saint-Pierre and Newfoundland, on the south by the Nova Scotia peninsula and Cape Breton Island, and on the west by the Gaspé Peninsula, New Brunswick, and Quebec. The Gulf of St. Lawrence contains numerous islands, including Anticosti, Prince Edward, Saint Pierre, Cape Breton, Miquelon-Langlade, and the Îles-de-la-Madeleine archipelago.

Half of Canada's ten provinces adjoin the Gulf: New Brunswick, Nova Scotia, Prince Edward Island, Newfoundland and Labrador, and Quebec.

There is no consensus on the demarcation of the St Lawrence River from the Gulf, nor whether it is hydrographically a gulf or an estuary.

According to Commission of Toponymy Quebec, the St. Lawrence River becomes the gulf at Pointe des Monts on the Côte-Nord and Matane Bas-Saint-Laurent or Sainte-Anne-des-Monts La Haute-Gaspésie, the Estuary is upstream, the Gulf of St. Lawrence, much wider, downstream.

The International Hydrographic Organization defines the gulf's extent as follows:

On the Northeast: A line running from Cape Bauld (North point of Kirpon Island, 51°40′N 55°25′W) to the East extreme of Belle Isle and on to the Northeast Ledge (52°02′N 55°15′W). Thence a line joining this ledge with the East extreme of Cape St. Charles (52°13'N) in Labrador.

On the Southeast: A line from Cape Canso (45°20′N 61°0′W) to Red Point (45°35′N 60°45′W) in Cape Breton Island, through this Island to Cape Breton [45°57′N 59°47′W] and on to Pointe Blanche (46°45′N 56°11′W) in the Island of St. Pierre, and thence to the southwest point of Morgan Island (46°51′N 55°49′W).

On the West: The meridian of 64°30'W from Pointe-Jaune (49°04′N 64°30′W) to Magpie (50°19′N 64°30′W), but the whole of Anticosti Island is included in the Gulf.

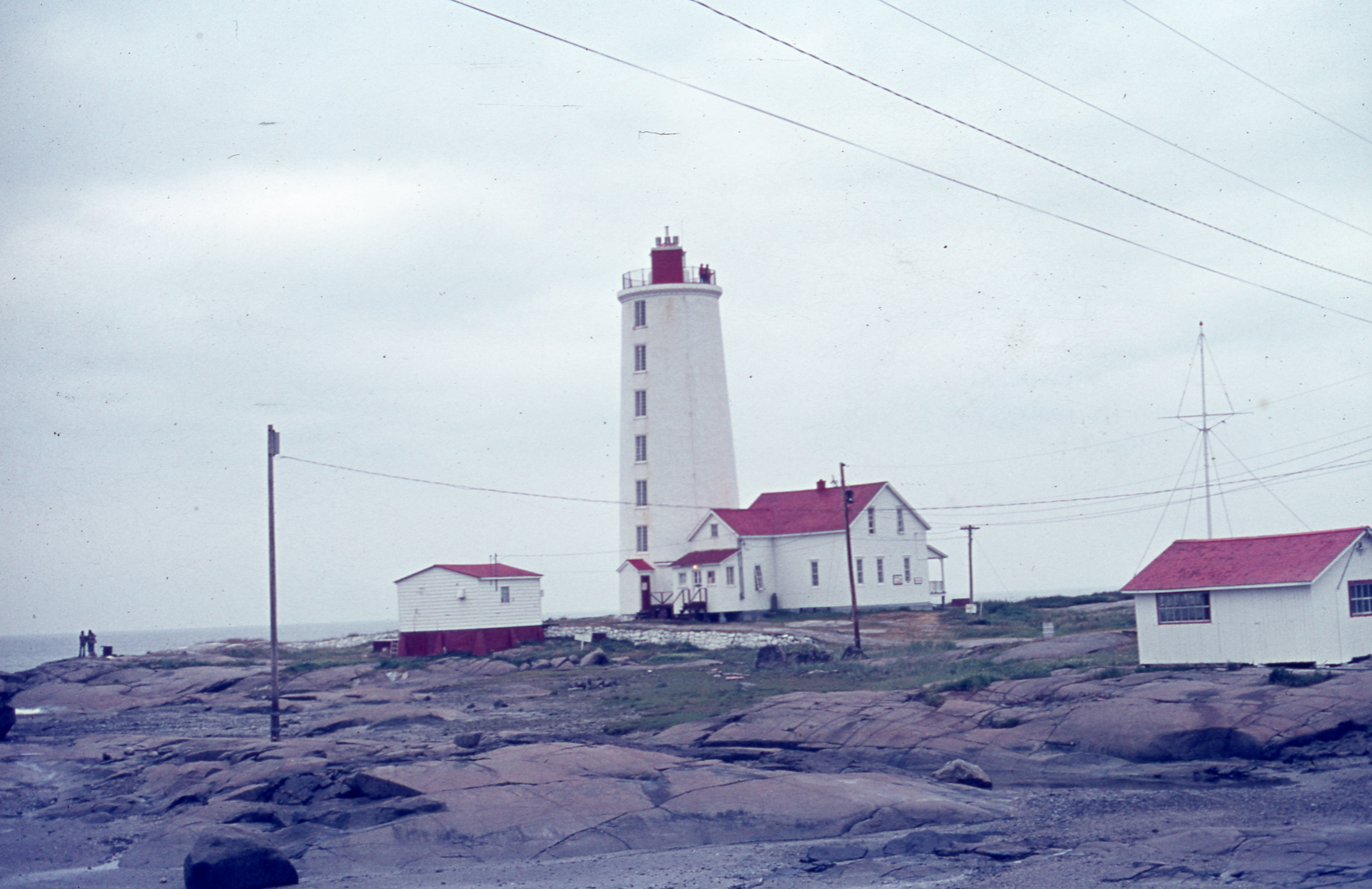
Pointe-des-Monts Lighthouse, Baie-Trinité, Quebec

At Baie-Trinité, the Pointe-des-Monts Lighthouse, a National historic site of Canada, was built in 1829–1830 on a point that geographers throughout history, since as early as Samuel de Champlain (1567–1655), have classified as the demarcation point between the St. Lawrence River and the Gulf of St. Lawrence.

Fisheries and Oceans Canada's "Estuary and Gulf of St. Lawrence planning area" covers most of the Estuary and Gulf of St. Lawrence bioregion, an area with some of the warmest surface waters in Atlantic Canada during summer and the largest amount of sea ice during winter. The planning area is approximately 240,000 km².

=== Tributaries and nested bays ===
Besides the St. Lawrence itself, significant rivers emptying into the Gulf of St. Lawrence include the Miramichi, Natashquan, Romaine, Restigouche, Margaree, Humber and Mingan.

Branches of the Gulf include Chaleur Bay, Fortune Bay, Miramichi Bay, St. George's Bay, Bay St. George, Bay of Islands, and the Northumberland Strait.

=== Outlets ===
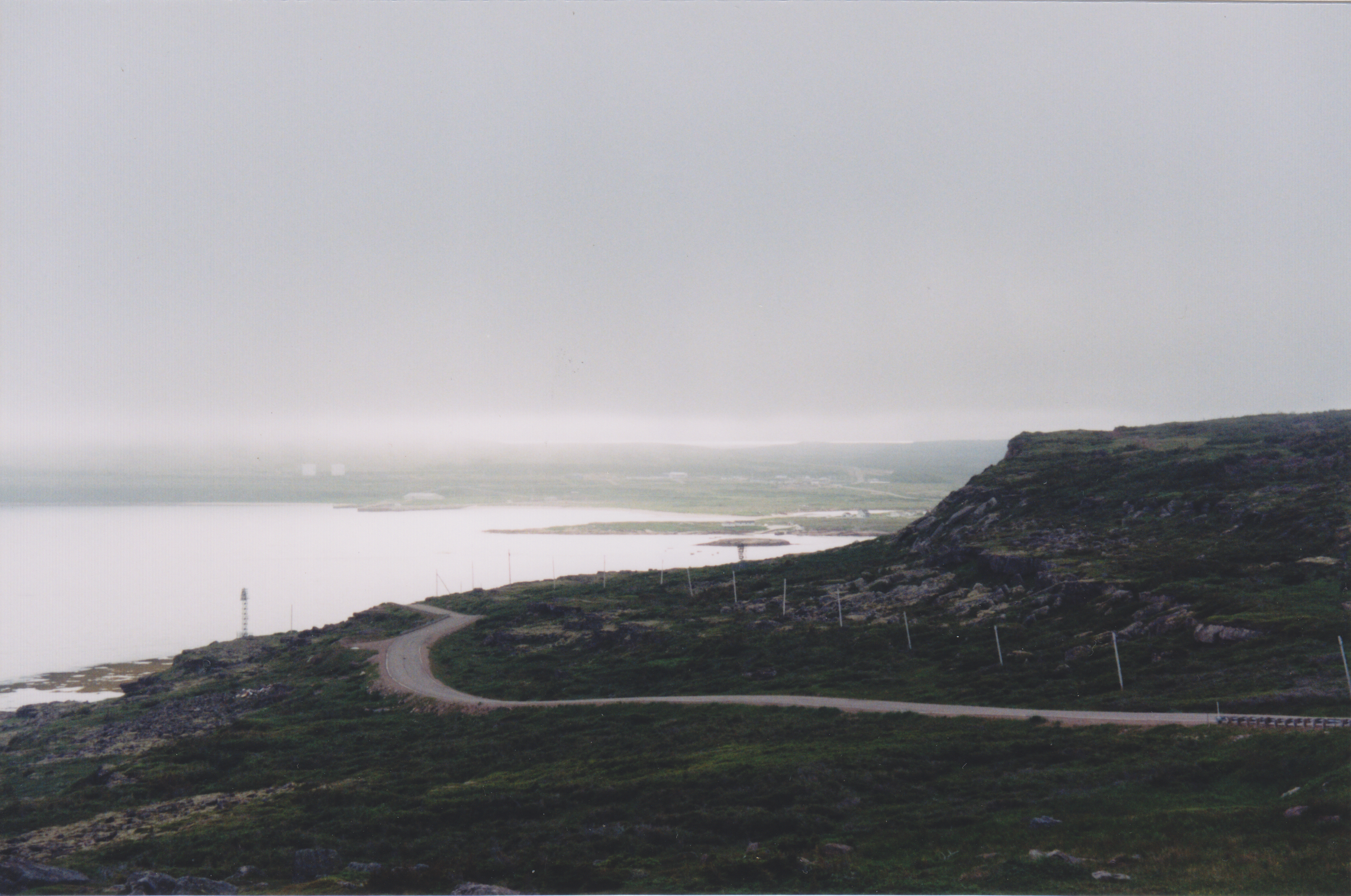
Strait of Belle Isle, as seen from Blanc Sablon, Quebec

Around Anticosti Island and to flow into the Atlantic Ocean, the waters of the Gulf take the following straits:

- Jacques Cartier Strait, between the shore of Côte-Nord region and the North of Anticosti Island.
- Honguedo Strait, a wide passage between the Gaspé Peninsula and Anticosti Island.
- Strait of Belle Isle between Labrador and Newfoundland: between 15 kilometres (9.3 miles) and 60 kilometres (37 miles) wide and 60 metres (200 feet) deep at its deepest.
- Cabot Strait, about 56 miles wide, is the entrance to the Gulf of St. Lawrence between Cape Ray, Newfoundland, and Cape North, the NE point of Cape Breton Island.
- Strait of Canso is located between Cape Breton Island and mainland Nova Scotia, it originally served as an outlet 1.0 km (0.6 mi) wide and 60 m (200 ft) deep at its deepest. Due to the construction of the Canso Causeway across the strait in 1955, the roadway no longer allows exchange of water between the Gulf of St. Lawrence and the Atlantic Ocean.

=== Undersea features ===
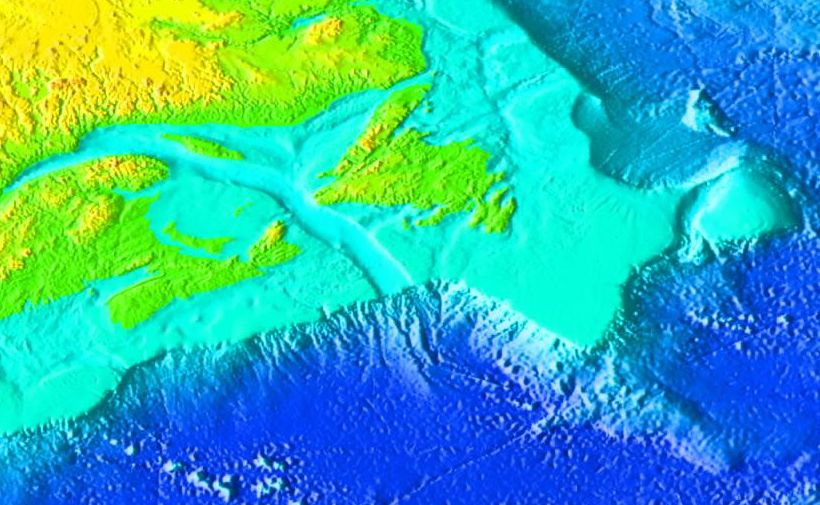
Bathymetry of the gulf, with the Laurentian Channel visible

The Laurentian Channel is a feature of the floor of the Gulf that was formed during previous ice ages, when the Continental Shelf was eroded by the St. Lawrence River during the periods when the sea level plunged. The Laurentian Channel is about 290 m (950 ft) deep and about 1,250 km (780 mi) long from the Continental Shelf to the mouth of the St. Lawrence River. Deep waters with temperatures between 2 and 6.5 °C (36 and 44 °F) enter the Gulf at the continental slope and are slowly advected up the channel by estuariane circulation. Over the 20th century, the bottom waters of the end of the channel (i.e. in the St. Lawrence estuary) have become hypoxic.

== History ==
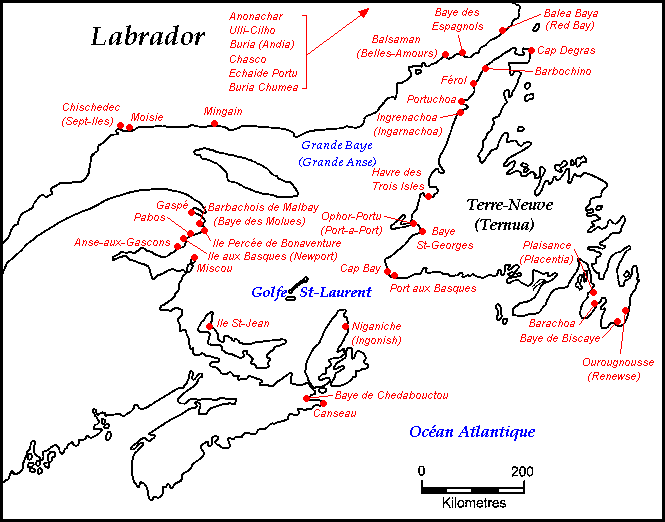
Basque settlements and sites dating from the 16th and 17th centuries

The gulf has provided a historically important marine fishery for various First Nations that have lived on its shores for millennia and used its waters for transportation.

The first documented voyage by a European in its waters was by the French explorer Jacques Cartier in 1534. Cartier named the shores of the St. Lawrence River "The Country of Canadas", after an indigenous word meaning "village" or "settlement", thus naming the world's second largest country.

Basque whalers from Saint-Jean-de-Luz sailed into the Gulf of St. Lawrence in 1530 and began whaling at Red Bay. They established their base on the Strait of Belle Isle and worked closely with the Iroquois in the Gulf of St. Lawrence. In 1579 the English government closed all English ports to Spanish oil imports. As a result, a third of Basque whale oil could not be sold. Basque whaling collapsed in the Gulf of St. Lawrence and never recovered.

The Royal Navy frigate HMS Tartar stationed in the Gulf of St. Lawrence during 1772 sprung her mast in a hard gale and had to go Halifax for repairs reports Rear Admiral Montagu from Boston.

== Ecology ==
=== Marine mammals ===
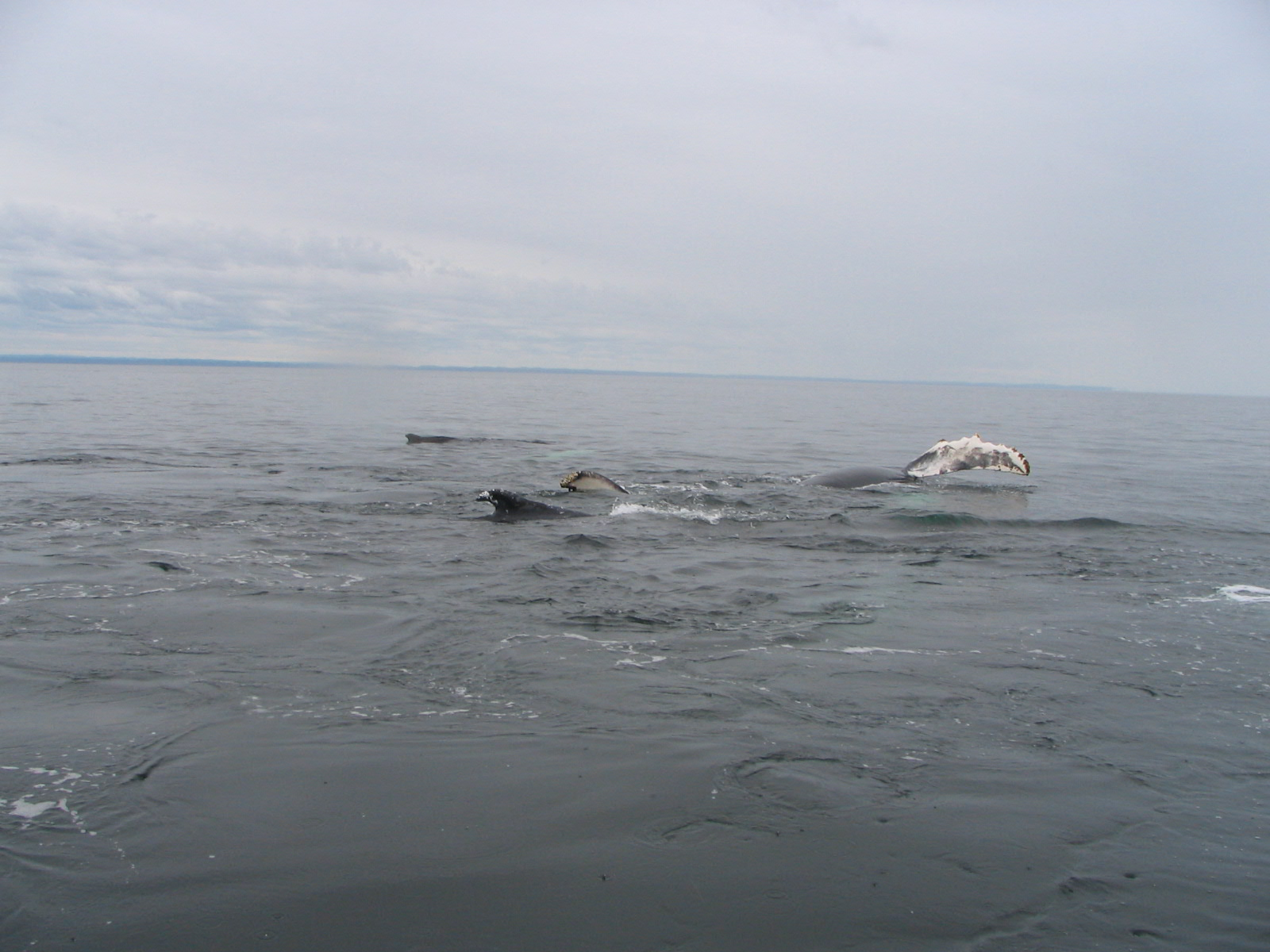
Humpback whales in the Jacques Cartier Strait

Thirteen species of cetaceans inhabit the Estuary of St. Lawrence and the Gulf of St. Lawrence:

1. Northern bottlenose whale
2. Beluga whale
3. Sperm whale
4. Atlantic white-sided dolphin
5. White-beaked dolphin
6. Orca
7. Long-finned pilot whale
8. Harbour porpoise
9. North Atlantic right whale
10. Common minke whale
11. Blue whale
12. Humpback whale
13. Fin whale

== Weather and climate ==
In winter, large quantities of ice form in the St. Lawrence River. Ice formation begins in December between Montreal and Quebec City. The prevailing winds and currents push this ice towards the estuary, generally reaching east of Les Méchins around the end of December. Ice covers the entire gulf in January and February.

Ice aids in navigation, preventing the formation of waves and therefore spray, thus having the advantage of preventing the icing process of ships.

== Human activity ==
=== Ports ===
Almost all of Quebec's ports are located along the St. Lawrence River seaway. Ports of the Gulf of St. Lawrence on the Côte-Nord Shore include Blanc-Sablon, Harrington Harbor, Natashquan, Havre-Saint-Pierre, Mingan, Port-Menier (Anticosti Island), Cap-aux-Meules (Îles-de-la-Madeleine).

== Protected Areas and National Parks ==
The Western Honguedo Strait Coral Conservation Area was created following the signing of the Canada–Quebec Collaborative Agreement to Establish a Network of Marine Protected Areas in Quebec in March 2018.

St. Paul Island, located off the northeastern tip of Cape Breton Island, is known as the "Graveyard of the Gulf" because of its many shipwrecks. Access to this island is controlled by the Canadian Coast Guard.

In 1919, the first Migratory Bird Sanctuaries (MBS) in Canada were established under the Migratory Birds Convention Act on Bonaventure Island, on the Bird Rocks of the Magdalen Islands, and on the Percé Rock. These migratory bird sanctuaries are administered by the Canadian Wildlife Service.

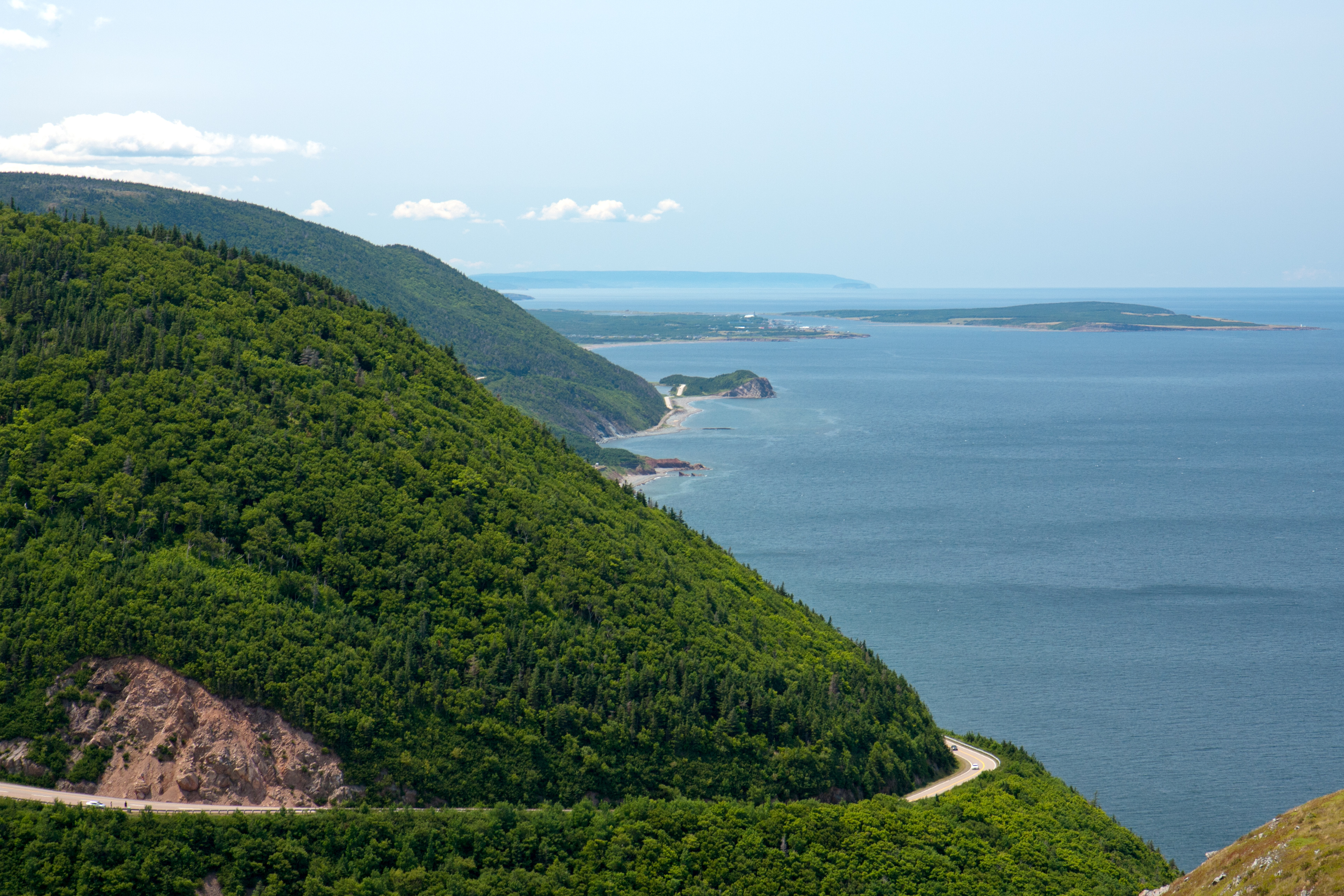
Cape Breton Highlands National Park, Nova Scotia

National Parks touching the Gulf of St. Lawrence include Mingan Archipelago National Park Reserve, in Côte-Nord, Forillon National Park on the eastern tip of the Gaspé Peninsula, Prince Edward Island National Park on the northern shore of the island, Kouchibouguac National Park on the northeastern coast of New Brunswick, Cape Breton Highlands National Park on the northern tip of Cape Breton Island, and Gros Morne National Park on the west coast of Newfoundland.

In Quebec, since March 31, 2024, the network of protected areas extends over 274,431 km^{2} and is established as follows:

- Continental environment (terrestrial and fresh water): 255,377 km2 or 16.89%;
- Marine and coastal environments: 18,991 km^{2} or 12.21% distributed as follows:
- Marine protected areas and territories set aside in the marine environment: 16,140 km2 or 10.39%;
- Portions of territories in marine and coastal environments associated with protected areas whose conservation objectives do not specifically target the marine environment (national parks, national park reserves of Quebec and Canada, migratory bird sanctuaries, planned aquatic reserves, reserves of projected biodiversity, areas of concentration of aquatic birds, etc.): 2,854 km^{2} or 1.84%;
- Plan Nord territory: 229,021 km^{2} or 19.19%.

The five provinces bordering the Gulf of St. Lawrence have several provincial parks with protected coasts.

== See also ==
- Anticosti Island
- Atlantic Ocean
- Estuary of St. Lawrence
- Maritime Peninsula
- St. Lawrence Seaway
