= Victor-Alphonse Huard =

French Canadian priest and naturalist (1853–1929)

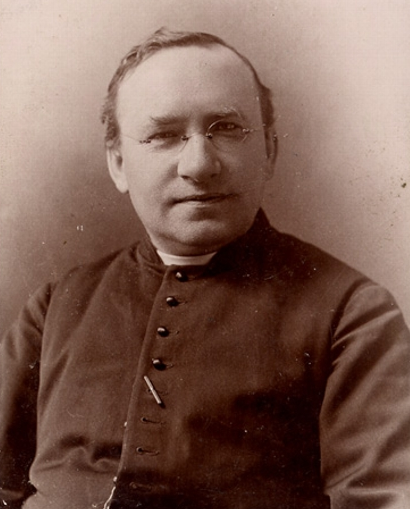
- Victor-Alphonse Huard c.1910
- Born: 28 February 1853; Quebec City, Quebec
- Died: 15 October 1929 (aged 76); Quebec City
- Known for: Natural sciences manuals and religious writings.
- Awards: Pro Ecclesia et Pontifice, D.Sc. honoris causa, apostolic blessing
- Scientific career
- Fields: Natural history
- Workplaces: Séminaire de Chicoutimi, Université Laval

Victor-Alphonse Huard (born Joseph-Alphonse, sometimes given as Joseph-Victor Alphonse; 28 February 1853 – 15 October 1929) was a French-Canadian churchman, naturalist, writer and editor. He was a popular educator and promoter of the natural sciences, although his anti-evolutionist stance garnered him criticism both in Quebec and elsewhere. He was the founder or editor of several publications, most notably the Naturaliste Canadien, and wrote a number of manuals. Although not particularly qualified for the position, he became the first Provincial Entomologist of Quebec.

== Biography ==
Huard (who occasionally wrote his name "Huart" until 1890) was born on 28 February 1853 in Saint-Roch, a ward of Quebec City, Quebec. His father, Laurent Huard, was a joiner; his mother was Ursule Thérien. He attended the Petit Séminaire of Quebec from 1863 to 1872, graduating with high standings.

He took an interest in natural history as a result of an outing where he was Léon Abel Provancher's hiking companion. He would for most of his life style himself Provancher's disciple, and from 1872 until Provancher's death the men maintained a correspondence.

=== Churchman at Chicoutimi ===
There were limited numbers of priests available in the Saguenay region, as it had only recently been opened for colonization, so Huard was sent to teach at the newly opened Seminary of Chicoutimi, which acted as both a minor seminary (Petit séminaire, lit. "little seminary") and a seminary proper (Grand séminaire, lit. "great seminary"). Huard's slight stutter and shyness prevented him from ever assuming active parish duty, although he is described as an affable, passionate man and a competent musician.

Huard taught a number of classes including religion, rhetorics, zoology and geography, and took on a number of positions in both institutions. He became the first director of the Grand Séminaire, and was successively or concurrently secretary, prefect of studies, vice-superior and superior of the Séminaire until 1899, stopping to teach in 1893 when he was vice-superior. In addition to those duties, he founded the seminary's bookstore and choir, organized the library, was curator of the museum, and co-founder and co-editor the Petit Séminaire's student newspaper. In 1895 he founded a religious publication, the Messager de Saint-Antoine ("St-Antony's Messenger").

Although he made use of his interests in natural history while teaching, it was not until 1894 that Huard had the chance to truly apply them, when he returned the Naturaliste Canadien, Provancher's monthly journal, to active publication. Although Provancher had hoped the new government would be willing to offer grants, Huard had to maintain the magazine alone until 1919 when the governments of Lomer Gouin and Louis-Alexandre Taschereau began to offer financial assistance. Under Huard, the magazine was more popular and less technical than Provancher's version, although it maintained an anti-evolution stance. The Naturaliste was printed practically without interruption until Huard's death. Huard also acquired part of Provancher's papers and his herbarium. Part of Provancher's last works would be published posthumously in the Naturaliste.

=== Naturalist at Quebec ===
In 1901 he returned to Quebec City, where his career took a definitive turn toward science. Between 1905 and 1925 he wrote a number of successful science textbooks, mostly for primary education. Although some were repeatedly reissued and used as the basis of other texts, they often garnered criticism for being too technical and suited more for teachers than pupils, or for their scientific qualities. His manual of geology in particular is maligned: Marie-Victorin declines to review it, Germain Beaulieu publicly vilipends it in La Patrie, and a writer in Science says it "dates from the previous century". Joseph-Clovis-Kemner Laflamme, another prominent naturalist, also criticized Huard's Zoology schoolbook.

These disputes didn't prevent Huard from rising in visibility, mostly thanks to his work at the Naturaliste and textbooks. He became curator at the Musée de l'Instruction Publique, the Parliament's museum, in 1904, and would keep the post until 1927. In 1913 he was appointed Provincial Entomologist, a nomination that surprised other naturalists, as Huard himself, despite his affinities, was not a particularly competent naturalist and never followed college-level classes. He would last two years at the post before being replaced by Georges Maheux. He was also editor of La Semaine religieuse de Québec ("Quebec Weekly Religious Courier"), another periodical founded by Provancher, between 1901 and 1913.

Huard had great ambitions. He hoped to complete Provancher's great work on the insects of the provinces, but only managed before his death to finish the volume on diurnal lepidoptera, leaving moths, aptera and diptera unfinished. He did complete a biography of Provancher, however, which was first published in the Naturaliste, then in book form. This work, despite being more hagiographic than historic, remains the only full-blown biography of Provancher. Amongst his other publications are a history of the church in Saguenay, notes from a travel in the Côte-Nord region (one of the first natural history descriptions of that region) and the Catholic Encyclopedia article on the Roman Catholic Diocese of Chicoutimi.

== Influence and legacy ==
Amongst various awards, Huard became a member of the scientific section of the Royal Society of Canada in 1913. In 1916, he was awarded a D.Sc. honoris causa degree from Université Laval. He was also granted the Pro Ecclesia et Pontifice cross (1903) and became an honorary canon in 1915. Pope Pius XI granted him a special apostolic blessing in 1924; news of his appointment as domestic prelate of the pope was received the day after his death. A modern provincial wildlife sanctuary, Victor-A.-Huard Ecological Reserve, was created in 1990 near Kenogami Lake and is named after him. A lake and river in Côte-Nord are also named after him, the Lac de l' Abbé Huard and Rivière de l' Abbé Huard.

In 2003, his entomological collections were acquired by Laval University from the Séminaire, and had to be thoroughly restored for the second time (the first time was in 1960). They contain approximatively 8 000 specimens representing 3 000 species, mostly from Saguenay-Lac-Saint-Jean and the area around Quebec City.

Huard acted as a link between the 19th century scientific period and the scientific revival of early 20th century Quebec, and was a model for those of his days. His major contribution was the publication of his natural history books, who were needed to replace the existing ones who, imported from France, adapted poorly for Canadian realities. He was also instrumental in keeping the work of Provancher from being too harshly misjudged. No biography of Huard has been published, although Conrad Laforte's MLSc Thesis, a bio-bibliography of him, come close.

== See also ==
- List of Roman Catholic scientist-clerics
