= Maliotenam =

Indian reserve in Quebec, Canada

Maliotenam Mani-Utenam (Innu-aimun)
- Indian reserve
- Etymology: City of Mary
- Location in Côte-Nord region of Quebec.
- Coordinates: 50°13′N 66°11′W
- Country: Canada
- Province: Quebec
- Region: Côte-Nord
- RCM: None
- Constituted: unspecified

Government
  - Type: Indian reserve
  - Chief: Mike Pelash McKenzie
  - Federal riding: Côte-Nord—Kawawachikamach—Nitassinan
  - Prov. riding: Duplessis

Area
  - Total: 5.20 km^{2} (2.01 sq mi)
  - Land: 5.20 km^{2} (2.01 sq mi)

Population (2021)
  - Total: 1,610
  - Density: 309.7/km^{2} (802/sq mi)
  - Change (2016–21): ▲4.4%
  - Dwellings: 542
- Time zone: UTC−5 (EST)
  - Summer (DST): UTC−4 (EDT)
- Postal Code: G4R
- Area codes: 418, 581, and 367
- Website: www.itum.qc.ca

Maliotenam (Mani-Utenam in Innu-aimun) is a First Nations reserve in Quebec, located adjacent to the city of Sept-Îles. Together with Uashat some distance away, it forms the Innu community of Uashat-Maliotenam. The community is a part of the Manicouagan district which is represented by Bloc Québécois MP Marilène Gill. The community has a population of approximately 1,600 people.

The community shares its administration with the nearby community of Uashat as the Innu Takuaikan Uashat Mak Mani-Utenam. The chief and council consists of the chief, deputy chief and five councillors. The chief and council are all elected by the members of the community Innu Takuaikan Uashat Mak Mani-Utenam. The current chief is Mike Pelash McKenzie, alongside Antoine (Maniteu) Grégoire as deputy chief. The current councillors are Jonathan St-Onge, Normand Ambroise, Dave Vollant, Kenny Régis, and Zachary Vollant.

Maliotenam is enclaved within the city of Sept-Îles and is therefore reachable by car via road 138. The nearest metropolitan city is Montreal which is more than 900 kilometres south-west of Maliotenam.

Although Maliotenam is a fairly small community of about 520 hectares, it has variety of services. There is a hospital, a supermarket, a youth centre, an arena and more.

== History ==
Maliotenam was created in 1949 by the Canadian Government, which at the time wanted the vast Innu community to come and settle there, which was not the case, many Innu preferring stay on the ancestral lands of Uashat, while others chose to settle in the village of Moisie. Maliotenam has an area of 527 hectares. The mother tongue is Innu and the second language is French.

== Culture and traditions ==
Even today, traditional practices are still part of Innu life, such as salmon fishing, Canada goose and caribou hunting, fur-bearing animal trapping and beaver trapping. Culture is thus preserved. There are still families who go up to the ancestral territories to practice these traditional practices, because for them this way of life is vital.

== Languages ==
The population of Maliotenam speaks mainly Innu with French being the preferred choice of second language.

== Education ==
The education sector is managed by the Innu Takuaikan Uashat Mak Mani-Utenam band government. Primary education in Maliotenam is set at the Tshishteshinu school. Secondary education is set at the Manikanetish school in Uashat.

== Health ==
The Innu Takuaikan Uashat Mak Mani-Utenam community operates the Mani-Utenam health clinic within Maliotenam. The clinic provides ordinary services, nurse care, medical services, maternal and child health. The health clinic is administered in concert with the clinic of Uashat.

== Innu Takuaikan Uashat Mak Mani-Utenam ==
Maliotenam is one of the community administered by the Innu Takuaikan Uashat Mak Mani-Utenam, an Innu First Nation in Quebec, Canada. It is based in Sept-Îles on the North Shore of the St. Lawrence River and owns the reserves of Maliotenam and Uashat. As of 2016, the band has a registered population of 4,608 members. It is run by a band council and is affiliated with the Mamuitun Tribal Council.

== See also ==
- Sept-Îles
- Innu Takuaikan Uashat Mak Mani-Utenam
