= List of hydroelectric power stations in Canada =

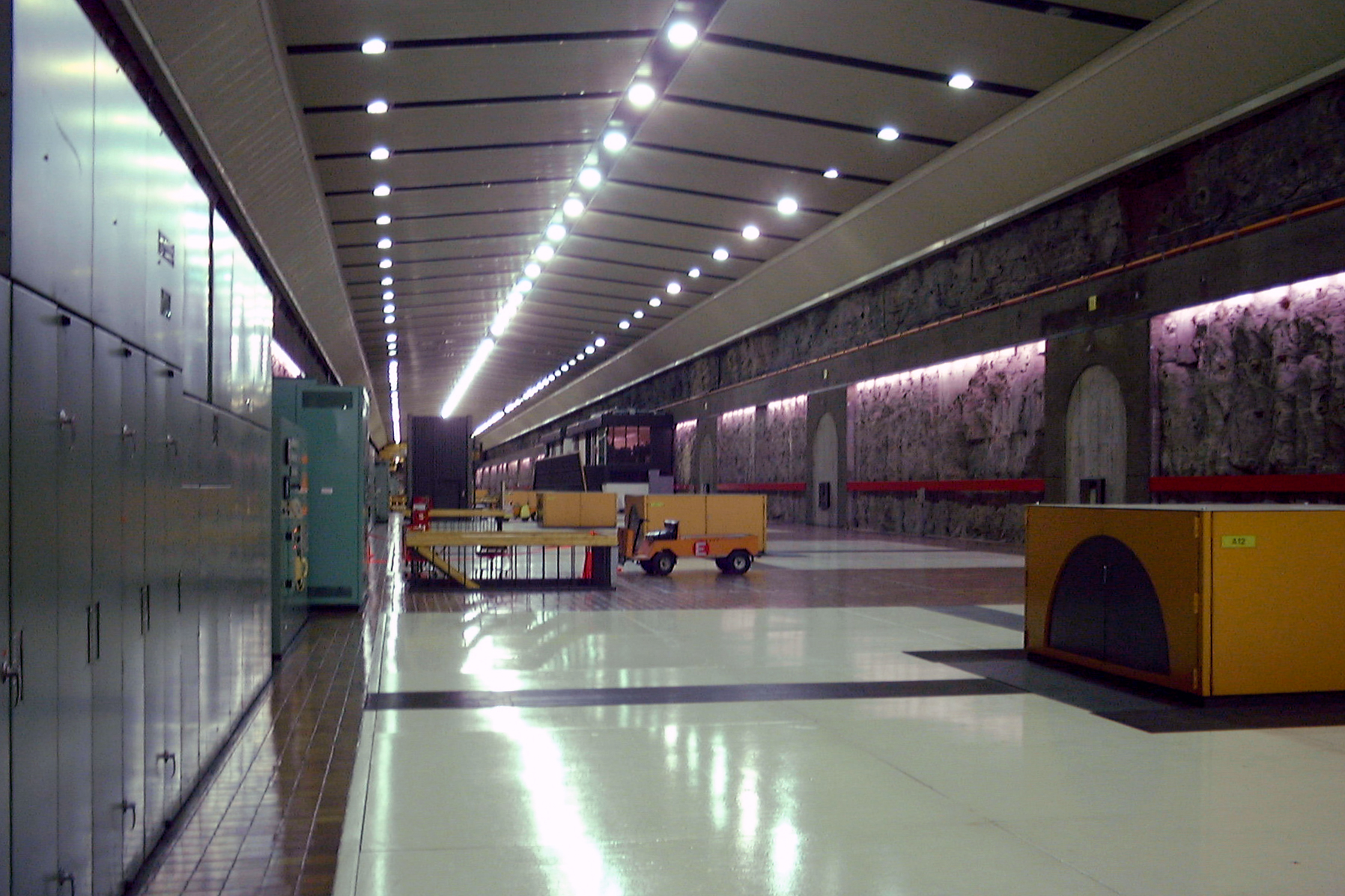
Inside the Robert-Bourassa generating station, the largest hydroelectric power station in Canada

This is a list of operational hydroelectric power stations in Canada with a current nameplate capacity of at least 100 MW.

The Sir Adam Beck I Hydroelectric Generating Station in Ontario was the first hydroelectric power station in Canada to have a capacity of at least 100 MW upon completion in 1922. Since then numerous other hydroelectric power stations have surpassed the 100 MW threshold. All but two of Canada's provinces or territories are home to at least one hydroelectric power station, those without being Prince Edward Island and Nunavut.

== List of power stations ==
Name	Province	Location	Capacity (MW)	Annual generation (GWh)	Owner	Type	Ref
Abitibi	Ontario	49°52′40″N 81°34′15″W	349	?	OPG	Reservoir	
Arrow Lakes	British Columbia	49°20′22″N 117°46′19″W	185	?	Columbia Power	Reservoir	
Aubrey Falls	Ontario	46°54′34″N 83°12′46″W	163	?	Brookfield Renewable	Reservoir	
Barrett Chute	Ontario	45°14′43″N 76°45′36″W	176	?	OPG	Reservoir	
Bay d'Espoir	Newfoundland and Labrador	47°59′25″N 55°47′59″W	613.4	2,657	NL Hydro	Reservoir	
Beauharnois	Quebec	45°18′51″N 73°54′37″W	1,853	11,700	Hydro-Québec	Run-of-the-river	
Beaumont	Quebec	47°33′20″N 72°50′12″W	270	?	Hydro-Québec	Run-of-the-river	
Beechwood	New Brunswick	46°32′32″N 67°40′09″W	112	?	NB Power	Reservoir	
Bersimis-1	Quebec	49°18′31″N 69°33′50″W	1,178	?	Hydro-Québec	Reservoir	
Bersimis-2	Quebec	49°10′02″N 69°14′26″W	869	?	Hydro-Québec	Run-of-the-river	
Bighorn	Alberta	52°18′32″N 116°19′45″W	120	408	TransAlta	Reservoir	
Brazeau	Alberta	52°57′59″N 115°34′44″W	355	397	TransAlta	Reservoir	
Bridge River	British Columbia	50°43′54″N 122°14′33″W	478	2,500	BC Hydro	Reservoir	
Brilliant	British Columbia	49°19′29″N 117°37′12″W	145	?	Columbia Power	Reservoir	
Brilliant Expansion	British Columbia	49°19′23″N 117°37′11″W	120	?	Columbia Power	Reservoir	
Brisay	Quebec	54°27′16″N 70°31′09″W	469	2,300	Hydro-Québec	Reservoir	
Carillon	Quebec	45°34′07″N 74°23′01″W	753	?	Hydro-Québec	Run-of-the-river	
Cat Arm	Newfoundland and Labrador	50°01′39″N 56°45′55″W	127	?	NL Hydro	Reservoir	
Cheakamus River	British Columbia	49°56′4″N 123°17′21″W	158	?	BC Hydro	Reservoir	
Chelsea	Quebec	45°30′45″N 75°46′39″W	152	?	Hydro-Québec	Run-of-the-river	
Chenaux	Ontario	45°35′06″N 76°40′25″W	144	?	OPG	Reservoir	
Churchill Falls	Newfoundland and Labrador	53°31′32″N 63°57′25″W	5,428	35,000	NL Hydro	Reservoir	
Chutes-des-Passes	Quebec	49°50′26″N 71°09′46″W	750	?	Rio Tinto Alcan	Reservoir	
Coteau Creek	Saskatchewan	51°16′30″N 106°52′23″W	186	?	SaskPower	Reservoir	
DeCew Falls II	Ontario	43°07′08″N 79°15′41″W	144	?	OPG	Reservoir	
Deer Lake	Newfoundland and Labrador	49°10′12″N 57°26′11″W	129	?	Kruger Energy	Reservoir	
Des Joachims	Ontario	46°10′52″N 77°41′45″W	429	?	OPG	Reservoir	
East Toba	British Columbia	50°40′30″N 123°57′37″W	147	?	Innergex	Run-of-the-river	
Eastmain-1	Quebec	52°10′54″N 76°03′05″W	480	2,700	Hydro-Québec	Reservoir	
Eastmain-1-A	Quebec	52°10′47″N 76°2′7″W	768	2,300	Hydro-Québec	Reservoir	
E.B. Campbell	Saskatchewan	53°41′19″N 103°20′47″W	288	900	SaskPower	Reservoir	
Forrest Kerr	British Columbia	56°43′30″N 130°40′22″W	195	?	AltaGas	Run-of-the-river	
Gordon M. Shrum	British Columbia	56°0′58″N 122°12′19″W	2,730	15,000	BC Hydro	Reservoir	
Grand Rapids	Manitoba	53°9′29″N 99°17′33″W	479	2,320	Manitoba Hydro	Reservoir	
Great Falls	Manitoba	50°27′47″N 96°0′11″W	129	?	Manitoba Hydro	Run-of-the-river	
Harmon	Ontario	50°06′40″N 82°12′26″W	220	?	OPG (75%); Moose Cree (25%)	Reservoir	
Island Falls	Saskatchewan	55°31′44″N 102°21′25″W	111	?	SaskPower	Reservoir	
Isle-Maligne	Quebec	48°34′37″N 71°38′05″W	402	?	Rio Tinto Alcan	Reservoir	
Jean-Lesage	Quebec	49°19′18″N 68°20′49″W	1,229	?	Hydro-Québec	Run-of-the-river	
Jenpeg	Manitoba	54°32′36″N 98°1′36″W	122	?	Manitoba Hydro	Reservoir	
John Hart	British Columbia	50°02′23″N 125°20′03″W	126	?	BC Hydro	Reservoir	
Jordan River	British Columbia	48°29′47″N 123°59′34″W	170	?	BC Hydro	Reservoir	
Kelsey	Manitoba	56°2′21″N 96°31′54″W	287	1,970	Manitoba Hydro	Run-of-the-river	
Kemano	British Columbia	53°33′48″N 127°56′32″W	790	?	Rio Tinto Alcan	Reservoir	
Kettle	Manitoba	56°23′3″N 94°37′54″W	1,220	8,500	Manitoba Hydro	Run-of-the-river	
Kipling	Ontario	50°08′42″N 82°12′31″W	232	?	OPG (75%); Moose Cree (25%)	Reservoir	
Kootenay Canal	British Columbia	49°27′10″N 117°30′55″W	583	3,175	BC Hydro	Reservoir	
La Gabelle	Quebec	46°26′54″N 72°44′32″W	131	?	Hydro-Québec	Run-of-the-river	
La Grande-1	Quebec	53°44′04″N 78°34′26″W	1,436	7,900	Hydro-Québec	Run-of-the-river	
La Grande-2-A	Quebec	53°46′46″N 77°32′57″W	2,106	11,600	Hydro-Québec	Reservoir	
La Grande-3	Quebec	53°43′40″N 75°59′55″W	2,417	12,600	Hydro-Québec	Reservoir	
La Grande-4	Quebec	53°53′12″N 73°27′55″W	2,779	14,600	Hydro-Québec	Reservoir	
La Trenche	Quebec	47°45′12″N 72°52′44″W	302	?	Hydro-Québec	Run-of-the-river	
La Tuque	Quebec	47°26′39″N 72°47′58″W	294	?	Hydro-Québec	Run-of-the-river	
Laforge-1	Quebec	54°10′14″N 72°36′55″W	878	4,500	Hydro-Québec	Reservoir	
Laforge-2	Quebec	54°35′30″N 71°16′15″W	319	1,800	Hydro-Québec	Run-of-the-river	
Les Cèdres	Quebec	45°18′31″N 74°01′38″W	113	?	Hydro-Québec	Run-of-the-river	
Limestone	Manitoba	56°30′25″N 94°6′25″W	1,350	9,000	Manitoba Hydro	Run-of-the-river	
Little Long	Ontario	50°00′15″N 82°09′56″W	205	?	OPG (75%); Moose Cree (25%)	Reservoir	
Long Spruce	Manitoba	56°24′1″N 94°22′10″W	980	7,100	Manitoba Hydro	Run-of-the-river	
Lower Notch	Ontario	47°08′20″N 79°27′15″W	274	?	OPG	Reservoir	
Mactaquac	New Brunswick	45°57′18″N 66°52′03″W	672	?	NB Power	Reservoir	
Manic-1	Quebec	49°11′30″N 68°19′47″W	184	?	Hydro-Québec	Run-of-the-river	
Manic-5	Quebec	50°38′23″N 68°43′37″W	1,528	7,400	Hydro-Québec	Reservoir	
Manic-5-PA	Quebec	50°38′26″N 68°44′13″W	1,064	?	Hydro-Québec	Reservoir	
McCormick	Quebec	49°11′35″N 68°19′37″W	235	?	Hydro-Québec (60%); Alcoa (40%)	Reservoir	
Mica	British Columbia	52°4′35″N 118°34′0″W	2,805	7,202	BC Hydro	Reservoir	
Mountain Chute	Ontario	45°11′42″N 76°54′26″W	170	?	OPG	Reservoir	
Muskrat Falls	Newfoundland and Labrador	53°14′44″N 60°46′22″W	824	4,900	NL Hydro	Reservoir	
Nipawin	Saskatchewan	53°19′11″N 104°2′31″W	255	?	SaskPower	Reservoir	
Otter Rapids	Ontario	50°10′52″N 81°38′08″W	182	?	OPG	Reservoir	
Otto Holden	Ontario	46°22′42″N 78°43′43″W	243	?	OPG	Reservoir	
Outardes-2	Quebec	49°08′59″N 68°24′17″W	523	?	Hydro-Québec	Run-of-the-river	
Outardes-3	Quebec	49°33′33″N 68°43′58″W	1,026	?	Hydro-Québec	Run-of-the-river	
Outardes-4	Quebec	49°42′21″N 68°54′24″W	785	?	Hydro-Québec	Reservoir	
Paugan	Quebec	45°48′37″N 75°55′52″W	226	?	Hydro-Québec	Run-of-the-river	
Peace Canyon	British Columbia	55°58′57″N 121°59′34″W	694	3,250	BC Hydro	Reservoir	
Péribonka	Quebec	49°30′28″N 71°10′59″W	385	2,200	Hydro-Québec	Run-of-the-river	
Pine Portage	Ontario	49°18′27″N 88°18′37″W	142	?	OPG	Reservoir	
Première-Chute	Quebec	47°36′00″N 79°27′09″W	131	?	Hydro-Québec	Run-of-the-river	
Rapide-Blanc	Quebec	47°47′48″N 72°58′24″W	204	?	Hydro-Québec	Run-of-the-river	
Rapides-des-Îles	Quebec	47°34′37″N 79°21′17″W	176	?	Hydro-Québec	Run-of-the-river	
Rapides-des-Quinze	Quebec	47°35′28″N 79°17′39″W	109	?	Hydro-Québec	Run-of-the-river	
Rapides-Farmer	Quebec	45°29′56″N 75°45′48″W	104	?	Hydro-Québec	Run-of-the-river	
René-Lévesque	Quebec	49°44′25″N 68°35′34″W	1,326	5,400	Hydro-Québec	Run-of-the-river	
Revelstoke	British Columbia	51°3′15″N 118°11′40″W	2,480	8,200	BC Hydro	Reservoir	
Robert H. Saunders	Ontario	45°00′28″N 74°47′34″W	1,045	?	OPG	Reservoir	
Robert-Bourassa	Quebec	53°46′55″N 77°31′58″W	5,616	31,000	Hydro-Québec	Reservoir	
Rocher-de-Grand-Mère	Quebec	46°36′54″N 72°40′45″W	230	?	Hydro-Québec	Run-of-the-river	
Romaine-1	Quebec	50°23′01″N 63°15′37″W	270	?	Hydro-Québec	Run-of-the-river	
Romaine-2	Quebec	50°37′28″N 63°11′39″W	640	3,300	Hydro-Québec	Reservoir	
Romaine-3	Quebec	51°07′51″N 63°24′49″W	395	?	Hydro-Québec	Reservoir	
Romaine-4	Quebec	51°20′52″N 63°29′12″W	245	?	Hydro-Québec	Reservoir	
Ruskin	British Columbia	49°11′45″N 122°24′27″W	105	?	BC Hydro	Reservoir	
Sainte-Marguerite-3	Quebec	50°42′18″N 66°46′47″W	884	2,730	Hydro-Québec	Reservoir	
Sarcelle	Quebec	52°40′02″N 76°38′05″W	150	?	Hydro-Québec	Run-of-the-river	
Seven Mile	British Columbia	49°1′47″N 117°30′11″W	805	3,400	BC Hydro	Reservoir	
Seven Sisters	Manitoba	50°7′13″N 96°0′44″W	165	?	Manitoba Hydro	Run-of-the-river	
Shawinigan-2	Quebec	46°32′11″N 72°46′02″W	200	?	Hydro-Québec	Reservoir	
Shawinigan-3	Quebec	46°32′01″N 72°45′55″W	194	?	Hydro-Québec	Run-of-the-river	
Shipshaw	Quebec	48°26′54″N 71°12′54″W	1,145	?	Rio Tinto Alcan	Reservoir	
Sir Adam Beck I	Ontario	43°08′57″N 79°02′40″W	498	?	OPG	Reservoir	
Sir Adam Beck II	Ontario	43°08′45″N 79°02′41″W	1,499	?	OPG	Reservoir	
Sir Adam Beck Pump	Ontario	43°08′40″N 79°03′36″W	174	?	OPG	Pumped-storage	
Smoky Falls	Ontario	50°03′40″N 82°09′41″W	267	?	OPG (75%); Moose Cree (25%)	Reservoir	
Spray	Alberta	50°59′54″N 115°22′30″W	112	210	TransAlta	Reservoir	
Stewartville	Ontario	45°24′26″N 76°30′24″W	182	?	OPG	Reservoir	
Toulnustouc	Quebec	49°58′14″N 68°09′34″W	526	2,600	Hydro-Québec	Reservoir	
Twin Falls	Newfoundland and Labrador	53.496478°N 64.5201199°W	225		Twin Falls Power Corporation Ltd.	Reservoir	
Waneta	British Columbia	49°00′15″N 117°36′43″W	490	1,980	Teck (67%); BC Hydro (33%)	Reservoir	
Waneta Expansion	British Columbia	49°00′15″N 117°36′42″W	335	627.4	Columbia Power (58%); Columbia Basin Trust (42%)	Reservoir	
Wells	Ontario	46°25′53″N 83°23′09″W	239	?	Brookfield Renewable	Reservoir	
Wreck Cove	Nova Scotia	46°33′1″N 60°24′41″W	200	?	Nova Scotia Power	Reservoir	
Wuskwatim	Manitoba	55°32′16″N 98°29′46″W	211	?	Wuskwatim Power; Manitoba Hydro	Reservoir	

=== Under construction ===
This is a list of the hydroelectric power stations under construction with an expected nameplate capacity of at least 100 MW.

Name	Province	Location	Capacity (MW)	Owner	Type	Year	Ref
Keeyask	Manitoba	56°20′47″N 95°12′17″W	695	Manitoba Hydro	Reservoir	2021	
Site C dam	British Columbia	56°11′41″N 120°54′51″W	580	BC Hydro	Run-of-the-river	2024	

== See also ==
- List of power stations in Canada by type
- List of hydroelectric power stations in the United States
