= List of generating stations in Quebec =

Quebec produces close to 96% of its electricity through hydropower. The James Bay Project is Quebec's largest generation complex, with an installed capacity of 16,527 megawatt of power, approximately 40% of the province's peak load. Hydro-Québec, the government-owned public utility is the main power generator in the province with 59 hydroelectric facilities located across the province, for a total installed capacity of 34,490 MW.

== Hydroelectric ==
=== Owned by Hydro-Québec ===
List of hydroelectric generating stations owned and operated by Hydro-Québec Production.

Facilities under construction
Planned facilities
Decommissioned facilities

Name	Location	Watershed	Type	Reservoir	Capacity (MW)	Units	Head (m)	Commissioned
Beauharnois	45°18′51″N 73°54′37″W	Saint Lawrence	Run of river	n/a	1,906	38	24.39	1932–1961
Beaumont	47°33′20″N 72°50′12″W	Saint-Maurice	Run of river	n/a	270	6	37.8	1958
Bersimis-1	49°18′31″N 69°33′50″W	Betsiamites	Reservoir	Pipmuacan Reservoir	1,178	8	266.7	1956
Bersimis-2	49°10′02″N 69°14′26″W	Betsiamites	Run of river	n/a	869	5	115.83	1959
Brisay	54°27′16″N 70°31′09″W	Caniapiscau	Reservoir	Caniapiscau Reservoir	469	2	37.5	1993
Bryson	45°39′40″N 76°37′52″W	Ottawa	Run of river	n/a	56	3	18.29	1925
Carillon	45°34′07″N 74°23′01″W	Ottawa	Run of river	n/a	753	14	17.99	1962
Chelsea	45°30′45″N 75°46′39″W	Gatineau	Run of river	n/a	152	5	28.35	1927
Chute-Allard	47°54′15″N 73°47′57″W	Saint-Maurice	Run of river	n/a	62	6	17.83	2008
Chute-Bell	45°46′26″N 74°41′09″W	Rouge	Run of river	n/a	10	2	17.8	1915–1999
Chute-Burroughs	45°08′47″N 72°01′08″W	Niger	Run of river	n/a	2	1	55.17	1929
Chats Falls Generating Station (Note: The four units located in Ontario are owned by Ontario Power Generation.)	45°28′30″N 76°14′18″W	Ottawa	Run of river	n/a	92	4	16.16	1931
Chute-Hemmings	45°51′45″N 72°27′03″W	Saint-François	Run of river	n/a	29	6	14.64	1925
Drummondville	45°53′13″N 72°29′02″W	Saint-François	Run of river	n/a	16	4	9.1	1910
Eastmain-1	52°10′54″N 76°3′5″W	Eastmain	Reservoir	Eastmain-1 Reservoir	507	3	63	2006
Bernard-Landry	52°10′47″N 76°2′7″W	Eastmain	Reservoir	Eastmain-1 Reservoir	768	3	63	2012
Grand-Mère	46°36′55″N 72°40′33″W	Saint-Maurice	Run of river	n/a	67	4	25.61	1915–1930
Hart-Jaune	51°47′06″N 67°54′46″W	Hart-Jaune	Reservoir	Petit-Lac-Manicouagan Reservoir	51	3	39.6	1960
Jean-Lesage	49°19′18″N 68°20′49″W	Manicouagan	Reservoir	Manic-2 Reservoir	1,145	8	70.11	1965–1967
La Gabelle	46°26′54″N 72°44′32″W	Saint-Maurice	Run of river	n/a	131	5	17.38	1924
La Grande-1	53°44′04″N 78°34′26″W	La Grande	Run of river	n/a	1,436	12	27.5	1994–1995
La Grande-2-A	53°46′46″N 77°32′57″W	La Grande	Reservoir	Robert-Bourassa Reservoir	2,106	6	138.5	1991–1992
La Grande-3	53°43′40″N 75°59′55″W	La Grande	Reservoir	La Grande-3 Reservoir	2,417	12	79	1982–1984
La Grande-4	53°53′12″N 73°27′55″W	La Grande	Reservoir	La Grande-4 Reservoir	2,779	9	116.7	1984–1986
La Tuque	47°26′39″N 72°47′58″W	Saint-Maurice	Run of river	n/a	294	6	34.75	1940–1955
Lac-Robertson (Note: Owned and operated by Hydro-Québec Distribution)	50°59′56″N 59°03′42″W	Véco	Reservoir	Robertson Lake	21	2	38.5	1995
Laforge-1	54°10′14″N 72°36′55″W	Laforge	Reservoir	Laforge-1 Reservoir	878	6	57.3	1993–1994
Laforge-2	54°35′30″N 71°16′15″W	Laforge	Reservoir	Laforge-2 Reservoir	319	2	27.4	1996
Les Cèdres	45°18′32″N 74°01′38″W	Saint Lawrence	Run of river	n/a	103	11	9.14	1914–1924
Magpie-2	Côte-Nord	Magpie			450			2026
Magpie-5	Côte-Nord	Magpie			385			2030
Manic-1	49°11′29″N 68°19′47″W	Manicouagan	Run of river	n/a	184	3	36.58	1966–1967
Daniel-Johnson	50°38′23″N 68°43′37″W	Manicouagan	Reservoir	Manicouagan Reservoir	1,596	8	141.8	1970
Manic-5-PA	50°38′37″N 68°43′48″W	Manicouagan	Reservoir	Manicouagan Reservoir	1,064	4	144.5	1989
Mercier	46°43′03″N 75°59′00″W	Gatineau	Reservoir	Baskatong Reservoir	55	5	18	2007
Mitis-1	48°36′13″N 68°08′19″W	Mitis	Run of river	n/a	6	2	36.58	1922–1929
Mitis-2	48°37′19″N 68°08′19″W	Mitis	Run of river	n/a	4	1	22.86	1947
Outardes-2	49°08′59″N 68°24′17″W	Outardes	Run of river	n/a	523	3	82.3	1978
Outardes-3	49°33′33″N 68°43′58″W	Outardes	Run of river	n/a	1,026	4	143.57	1969
Outardes-4	49°42′21″N 68°54′24″W	Outardes	Reservoir	Outardes-4 Reservoir	785	4	120.55	1969
Paugan	45°48′42″N 75°55′37″W	Gatineau	Run of river	n/a	213	8	40.54	1928
Péribonka	49°30′28″N 71°10′59″W	Peribonka	Reservoir		405	3	67.6	2007–2008
Petit Mécatina-3	Côte-Nord	Petit-Mécatina			320			2026
Petit Mécatina-4	Côte-Nord	Petit-Mécatina			880			2023
Première-Chute	47°36′00″N 79°27′09″W	Ottawa	Run of river	n/a	131	4	22.26	1968–1975
Rapide-2	47°56′01″N 78°34′34″W	Ottawa	Run of river	n/a	67	4	20.43	1954–1964
Rapide-7	47°46′08″N 78°18′46″W	Ottawa	Reservoir	Decelles Lake	67	4	20.73	1941–1949
Rapide-Blanc	47°47′48″N 72°58′24″W	Saint-Maurice	Reservoir	Blanc Reservoir	204	6	32.92	1934–1955
Rapide-des-Cœurs	47°47′21″N 73°22′40″W	Saint-Maurice	Run of river	n/a	79	6	22.69	2008–2009
Rapides-des-Îles	47°34′35″N 79°21′17″W	Ottawa	Run of river	n/a	176	4	26.22	1966–1973
Rapides-des-Quinze	47°35′24″N 79°17′41″W	Ottawa	Run of river	n/a	103	6	25.9	1923–1955
Rapides-Farmer	45°29′56″N 75°45′48″W	Gatineau	Run of river	n/a	104	5	20.12	1927
René-Lévesque	49°44′25″N 68°35′34″W	Manicouagan	Reservoir	Manic-3 Reservoir	1,244	6	94.19	1975–1976
Rivière-des-Prairies	45°35′22″N 73°39′26″W	Rivière des Prairies	Run of river	n/a	54	6	7.93	1929
Robert-Bourassa	53°46′55″N 77°31′58″W	La Grande	Reservoir	Robert-Bourassa Reservoir	5,616	16	137.16	1979–1981
Rocher-de-Grand-Mère	46°36′55″N 72°40′33″W	Saint-Maurice	Run of river	n/a	230	3	24.3	2004
Romaine-1	50°23′07″N 63°15′39″W	Romaine	Reservoir	Romaine-1 Reservoir	270	2	62.5	2015-2016
Romaine-2	50°37′28″N 63°11′39″W	Romaine	Reservoir	Romaine-2 Reservoir	640	2	156.4	2014
Romaine-3	51°06′52″N 63°24′00″W	Romaine	Reservoir	Romaine-3 Reservoir	395	2	118.9	2017
Romaine-4	51°20′52″N 63°29′12″W	Romaine	Reservoir	Romaine-4 Reservoir	245	2	88.9	2020
Sainte-Marguerite-3 (Note: The addition of a third unit is planned.)	50°42′18″N 66°46′47″W	Sainte-Marguerite	Reservoir	Sainte-Marguerite-3 Reservoir	882	2	330	2003
Saint-Narcisse	46°32′53″N 72°24′38″W	Batiscan	Run of river	n/a	15	2	44.81	1926
Sarcelle	52°40′01″N 76°38′04″W	La Grande	Reservoir	Opinaca Reservoir	150	3	11.7	2013
Sept-Chutes	47°07′31″N 70°48′57″W	Sainte-Anne	Run of river	n/a	22	4	124.97	1916–1999
Shawinigan-2	46°32′11″N 72°46′02″W	Saint-Maurice	Run of river	n/a	200	8	44.2	1911–1929
Shawinigan-3	46°32′02″N 72°45′56″W	Saint-Maurice	Run of river	n/a	194	3	44.2	1948
Toulnustouc	49°58′14″N 68°09′34″W	Toulnustouc	Reservoir	Sainte-Anne Lake	526	2	152	2005
Trenche	47°45′12″N 72°52′44″W	Saint-Maurice	Run of river	n/a	302	6	48.47	1950

=== Stations with partial Hydro-Québec ownership ===
Name	Region	Watershed	Type	Reservoir	Capacity (MW)	Units	Head	Commissioned	Ownership
McCormick	49°11′35″N 68°19′37″W	Manicouagan	Run of river	n/a	392	8	37.8	1952	Hydro-Québec (60%) and Alcoa (40%)

=== Privately owned hydroelectric generating stations ===
List of privately owned hydroelectric generating stations in Quebec, including facilities owned by municipal utilities.

Name	Location	Capacity (MW)	Date	Owner	Ref
Abénaquis	45°24′15″N 71°53′50″W	2.8	1910–1984	Hydro-Sherbrooke	
Adam-Cunningham	48°39′30″N 71°10′15″W	7	1953	Resolute Forest Products	
Arthurville Hydroelectric Dam	46°49′35″N 70°45′23″W	0.65	1993	Algonquin Power	
Ayers-1	45°38′12″N 74°21′41″W	4.5	1929	Ayers limitée	
Ayers-2	45°38′37″N 74°21′11″W	1.2	1994	Ayers limitée	
Baie-Saint-Paul	Baie-Saint-Paul	0.8	1898–1997	Société d'énergie de Baie-Saint-Paul	
Barrage-Larocque (Hydro Bromptonville)	45°28′42″N 71°57′12″W	9.9	1997	Kruger Energy	
Marches-Naturelles	46°53′39″N 71°09′31″W	4.5	1908–1995	Boralex	
Belding	45°08′30″N 71°48′40″W	1.5	1910	Ville de Coaticook	
Belle-Rivière	48°06′51″N 71°45′50″W			Société d'énergie Belle Rivière	
Belleterre Hydroelectric Dam (Note: Also known as Winneway)	47°34′21″N 78°33′31″W	2.2	1994	Algonquin Power	
Bésy	48°26′04″N 71°14′54″W	18.5	2006	Resolute Forest Products	
Bird-1	46°44′57″N 71°42′39″W	2	1937–1994	Boralex	
Bird-2	46°44′57″N 71°42′39″W	2.8	1995	Boralex	
Buckingham	Buckingham	9.9	1913–1995	Boralex	
Cascades-Savard	51°18′20″N 68°07′32″W	0.03	1988	Restaurant Relais-Gabriel enr.	
Chutes-de-la-Chaudière	46°42′52″N 71°16′57″W	24		Innergex	
Chicoutimi	48°25′34″N 71°04′34″W	8	1923	Resolute Forest Products	
Chute-à-Caron Power Station	48°27′01″N 71°15′13″W	224	1931	Rio Tinto Alcan	
Chute-à-la-Savane Power Station	48°45′15″N 71°50′23″W	210	1953	Rio Tinto Alcan	
Chute-aux-Galets	48°39′06″N 71°12′12″W	14.4	1921	Resolute Forest Products	
Chute-Blanche	Sainte-Jeanne-d'Arc	1.2	1998	Hydro-Morin	
Chute-des-Passes Power Station	49°50′26″N 71°09′46″W	750	1959	Rio Tinto Alcan	
Chute-du-Diable Power Station	48°46′51″N 71°41′49″W	205	1952	Rio Tinto Alcan	
Chute-Ford Hydroelectric Dam (Glenford)	46°50′18″N 71°56′26″W	4.95	1994	Algonquin Power	
Chute-Garneau	48°23′10″N 71°07′50″W	5.3	1925-2011	City of Saguenay	
Chutes-à-Gorry	46°47′25″N 72°00′28″W	10.8	1993–1997	Société d'énergie Columbus	
Club Bataram	Clermont	0.1	19??	Pourvoirie Charlevoix	
Club des Alcaniens	Rivière-aux-Rats	0.02	1981	Club des Alcaniens Shawinigan	
Corbeau	46°18′51″N 75°56′36″W				
Côte Sainte-Catherine 1	45°24′24″N 73°34′8″W	2	1995	Algonquin Power	
Côte Sainte-Catherine 2	45°24′24″N 73°34′8″W	4.8	1993	Algonquin Power	
Côte Sainte-Catherine 3	45°24′24″N 73°34′8″W	4.5	1995	Algonquin Power	
Daniel-Larocque (Mont-Laurier)	46°33′17″N 75°29′59″W	2.725	1912–1987	Algonquin Power	
Donnacona	46°40′47″N 71°44′43″W	4.8	1913–1997	Algonquin Power	
Drummond	45°22′51″N 71°57′38″W	0.6	1927–1965	Hydro-Sherbrooke	
Dufferin	45°35′05″N 75°25′05″W	40	1958	Brookfield Renewable Power	
East Angus	East Angus	2	1898–1992	Boralex	
Eustis	45°18′26″N 71°52′52″W	0.7	1986	Hydro-Sherbrooke	
Fraser	47°49′58″N 69°32′04″W	2.3	1992	Hydro-Fraser	
Frontenac	45°24′07″N 71°53′57″W	2.2	1917–1988	Hydro-Sherbrooke	
Grande-Dame, La	45°16′21″N 72°06′22″W	1.8	1911	Hydro-Magog	
High Falls (Quebec)	45°50′20″N 75°38′50″W	104	1929	Brookfield Renewable Power	
Hull	Gatineau	12	1913	Domtar	
Hull-2	Gatineau	27	1920	Hydro Ottawa	
Huntingville	Sherbrooke	0.5	1996	Boralex	
Isle-Maligne	48°34′37″N 71°38′05″W	402	1926	Rio Tinto Alcan	
Jean-Guérin	46°38′07″N 71°02′42″W	5.87	1998	Société d'énergie Columbus	
Jim-Gray (Note: Resolute Forest Products' water power lease for this facility was terminated by the Government of Quebec as of December 31, 2011)	48°41′54″N 71°12′46″W	63	1953	Government of Quebec	
Joey-Tanenbaum	45°52′42″N 76°41′46″W	17	1994	Brookfield Renewable Power	
Jonquière (Joseph-Perron)	48°25′00″N 71°15′20″W	4.5	1998	Resolute Forest Products	
Jonquière-N⁰-1	48°25′18″N 71°15′15″W	4.5	1996	Hydro-Jonquière	
L'Anse-Saint-Jean	48°12′27″N 70°17′05″W	0.45	1995	Hydro-Morin	
La Pulpe	48°24′39″N 68°33′11″W	3.7	1997	Boralex	
La Sarre-1	La Sarre	1.1	1994	Hydro-Abitibi	
La Sarre-2	La Sarre	0.7	1995	Hydro-Abitibi	
Lebreux	48°09′20″N 65°20′48″W	1.1	1995	Hydro Canomore	
Low	Low	0.4	1994	Hydro Low	
Magpie River	50°19′25″N 64°27′19″W	40.6	2008	Hydromega	
Maquatua	Wemindji	1.1	1985	Sakami Eeyou Corporation	
Masson	45°33′36″N 75°25′20″W	105	1933	Brookfield Renewable Power	
McDougall	46°44′27″N 71°41′55″W	8.5	1925	Boralex	
Memphrémagog	45°15′46″N 72°08′40″W	1.9	1910	Hydro-Magog, Hydro-Sherbrooke	
Minashtuk	48°54′21″N 72°12′25″W	9.9	2000	Hydro-Ilnu	
Montmagny	Montmagny	2.1	1996	Innergex	
Moulin Melbourne	Melbourne	0.12	2003	9067-8780 Québec	
Moulin-aux-Abénakis	Sainte-Claire de Bellechasse	0.4	1997	Hubert Lacoste	
Murdock-Wilson	48°28′00″N 71°14′12″W	55	1957	Resolute Forest Products	
Onatchiway	48°53′34″N 71°02′16″W	0.45	1925	Resolute Forest Products	
Paton	45°24′15″N 71°53′50″W	1.7	1927	Hydro-Sherbrooke	
Penman	Coaticook	2	1985	Town of Coaticook	
Pentecôte	Port-Cartier	2	1999	Algonquin Power	
Petite High Falls	45°32′02″N 75°37′30″W	0.5	1999	Hydro Norbyco	
Petites-Bergeronnes	48°15′57″N 69°37′47″W	4.2	1994	Société d'énergie Columbus	
Pont-Arnaud	48°24′27″N 71°07′29″W	8.0	1913-2011	City of Saguenay	
Portneuf 1	48°39′28″N 69°07′57″W	8	1996	Innergex	
Portneuf-2	48°39′20″N 69°10′36″W	9.9	1996	Innergex	
Portneuf-3	48°41′29″N 69°20′21″W	8	1996	Innergex	
Pourvoirie Domaine Touristique La Tuque	La Tuque	0.1	2002	Pourvoirie Domaine La Tuque	
Rawdon Dam	46°02′45″N 73°43′50″W	2.5	1994	Algonquin Power	
Rivière-du-Loup Dam	47°49′59″N 69°31′52″W	2.6	1885–1995	Algonquin Power	
Rock Forest	45°20′31″N 71°59′37″W	2.7	1911–2000	Hydro-Sherbrooke	
RSP-1	48°44′06″N 69°03′54″W	1	1954–1993	Boralex	
RSP-2	48°43′57″N 69°10′17″W	6	1995	Boralex	
RSP-3	48°44′06″N 69°03′54″W	5.5	1995	Boralex	
S.P.C. (Chute-Blanchette)	48°24′46″N 71°06′02″W	38	1957	Elkem Métal Canada	
Saint-Alban Dam	46°42′38″N 72°04′36″W	8.2	1901–1996	Algonquin Power	
Saint-Jérôme	45°48′33″N 74°01′47″W	1.5	1888–1997	Mini-Centrales de l'Est	
Saint-Jovite	Saint-Jovite	0.3	1985	Les Apôtres de l'Amour Infini	
Saint-Lambert	Saint-Lambert	6	1996	Boralex	
Saint-Paul	45°08′20″N 71°48′30″W	0.9	1986	Hydro-Coaticook	
Chute-à-Magnan (Saint-Paulin)	Saint-Paulin	7.7	1994	Innergex	
Saint-Raphaël Dam	46°47′54″N 70°44′55″W	3.5	1994	Algonquin Power	
Sainte-Brigitte Dam	46°01′47″N 72°28′49″W	4.2	1994	Algonquin Power	
Sainte-Marguerite-1 and I-B	50°11′51″N 66°38′11″W	30.1	1993	Hydromega	
Sainte-Marguerite-2	50°12′46″N 66°39′39″W	19.3	1954	Iron Ore Company of Canada	
Shipshaw Power Station	48°26′54″N 71°12′54″W	896	1943	Rio Tinto Alcan	
T.-D.-Bouchard Dam (St-Hyacinthe)	45°37′15″N 72°57′20″W	2.25	1995	Algonquin Power	
Thibaudeau-Ricard	Shawinigan	4.9	1997	Thibaudeau-Ricard	
W.R. Beatty	45°55′08″N 76°55′13″W	11	1917–1995	Brookfield Renewable Power	
Weedon	45°39′41″N 71°27′49″W	3.825	1915	Hydro-Sherbrooke	
Westbury	45°29′52″N 71°37′12″W	4.8	1929	Hydro-Sherbrooke	
Windsor	Windsor	5.5	1996	Innergex	

== Other renewables ==
=== Wind ===
List of wind farms in Quebec.

Name	Location	Capacity (MW)	Date	Owner	Ref
Baie-des-Sables Wind Farm	48°42′08″N 67°52′21″W	109.5	2006	Cartier Wind Energy	
Carleton Wind Farm	48°12′10″N 66°07′42″W	109.5	2008	Cartier Wind Energy	
Site nordique expérimental en éolien CORUS	Gaspé	4.1	2010	Wind Energy TechnoCentre	
De l'Érable Wind Farm	46°05′49″N 71°38′51″W	100	2013	Enerfin	
Des Moulins Wind Project	46°10′26″N 71°21′05″W	156	2013	Invenergy	
Gros-Morne	49°12′23″N 65°26′54″W	211.5	2011	Cartier Wind Energy	
Jardin d'Eole Wind Farm	48°43′37″N 67°37′51″W	127.5	2009	Northland Power	
L'Anse-à-Valleau Wind Farm	49°05′38″N 64°39′13″W	100.5	2007	Cartier Wind Energy	
Lac Alfred Wind Project	48°23′21″N 67°45′06″W	300	2013	EDF Énergies Nouvelles / Enbridge	
Le Nordais (Cap-Chat)	Cap-Chat	57	1998	TransAlta	
Le Nordais (Matane)	Matane	42.75	1999	TransAlta	
Le Plateau Wind Farm (Note: A 23 MW expansion is scheduled for 2013.)	48°02′15″N 67°27′58″W	138.6	2012	Invenergy	
Massif du Sud Wind Project	46°34′49″N 70°26′24″W	150	2013	EDF Énergies Nouvelles / Enbridge	
Montagne-Sèche	49°10′45″N 64°57′12″W	58.5	2011	Cartier Wind Energy	
Mont-Louis	49°12′03″N 65°39′26″W	100.5	2011	Northland Power	
Mount Copper	Murdochville	54	2005	NextEra Energy Resources	
Mount Miller	Murdochville	54	2005	NextEra Energy Resources	
Montérégie Wind Farm	45°17′58″N 73°36′27″W	101.2	2012	Kruger Inc.	
New Richmond Wind Farm	48°12′47″N 65°41′10″W	67.8	2013	TransAlta	
Saint-Robert-Bellarmin Wind Project	45°41′32″N 70°32′56″W	80	2012	EDF Énergies Nouvelles / Enbridge	
Seigneurie de Beaupré 2/3 Wind Farm	47°22′20″N 70°51′39″W	271.8	2013	Boralex / Gaz Métro	
Saint-Damase Community Wind Project	48°37′46″N 67°51′56″W	24	2013	Municipality of Saint-Damase / Algonquin Power	
Viger-Denonville Community Wind Farm	47°55′07″N 69°13′04″W	24.6	2013	Rivière du Loup RCM / Innergex	
Saint-Ulric	Saint-Ulric	2.25	1998	Hydro-Québec Production	

=== Biomass ===
List of biomass and waste generating stations in Quebec.

Name	Location	Capacity (MW)	Date	Owner	Type	Ref
Brompton Biomass Cogen.	45°28′51″N 71°57′08″W	19	2007	Kruger Energy	Biomass	
Dolbeau Biomass Cogen.	48°52′48″N 72°13′04″W	26.5	2012	Resolute Forest Products	Biomass	
Haute-Yamaska, Roland Thibault	45°27′49″N 72°46′50″W	3	2012–2013	Terreau Biogaz	Waste	
Chapais Énergie	Chapais	27		Chapais Énergie, s.e.c.	Biomass	
Fibrek Saint-Félicien	48°44′44″N 72°30′45″W	42.5		Fibrek	Biomass	
Saint-Nicéphore	45°49′10″N 72°22′31″W	7.6	2012	Waste Management, Inc	Waste	
Saint-Thomas	46°03′52″N 73°15′10″W	9.35	2012	EBI Énergie	Waste	
Senneterre	Senneterre	34.6	2000	Boralex	Biomass	
Témiscaming mill	46°42′40″N 79°05′47″W	8.1	2008	Tembec	Biomass	
Thurso Cogeneration Plant	45°36′03″N 75°15′20″W	24.3	2012	Fortress Specialty Cellulose	Biomass	

== Nuclear ==
List of nuclear generating stations in Quebec.

Name	Location	Capacity (MW)	Date	Owner	Type	Ref
Gentilly Nuclear Generating Station	46°23′42″N 72°21′21″W	635	1983–2012	Hydro-Québec	Nuclear	

== Fossil fuel ==
List of fossil fuel generating stations in Quebec.

Name	Location	Capacity (MW)	Date	Owner	Type	Ref
Bécancour gas turbine	46°23′31″N 72°21′8″W	411	1994	Hydro-Québec	Natural gas	
Cadillac gas turbine (Note: The Cadillac gas turbine is temporarily used as a synchronous condenser to supply reactive power on the Abitibi regional grid until its scheduled retirement in 2014.)	48°12′51″N 78°17′59″W	162	1976	Hydro-Québec	Diesel	
La Citière gas turbine	45°24′55″N 73°26′14″W	309	1980	Hydro-Québec	Diesel	
Tracy Thermal Generating Station	45°59′50″N 73°10′20″W	660	1964–1968	Hydro-Québec	Fuel oil	
Bécancour cogeneration project (TCE) (Note: Mothballed until 2016.)	46°22′2″N 72°24′15″W	550	2006	TransCanada	Natural gas	

== Off-grid ==
List of all generating stations in Quebec serving loads not connected to the main North American power grid.

Name	Location	Capacity (MW)	Date	Owner	Type	Ref
Cap-aux-Meules generating station	47°22′26″N 61°53′07″W	67.0	1992	Hydro-Québec Distribution	Fuel oil	
Île-d'Entrée	Entry Island	1.2	1992	Hydro-Québec Distribution	Diesel	
Akulivik (Note: A new 2,028 kW plant is under construction and is scheduled to be in service in 2015.)	Akulivik	0.9	pre-1981	Hydro-Québec Distribution	Diesel	
Aupaluk	Aupaluk	0.8	pre-1981	Hydro-Québec Distribution	Diesel	
Blanc-Sablon (Note: Back-up generators.)	Blanc-Sablon	4.9	n/a	Hydro-Québec Distribution	Diesel	
Clova	Clova	0.5	pre-1981	Hydro-Québec Distribution	Diesel	
Inukjuak	Inukjuak	3.0	pre-1981	Hydro-Québec Distribution	Diesel	
Ivujivik	Ivujivik	1.0	1985	Hydro-Québec Distribution	Diesel	
Kangiqsualujjuaq	Kangiqsualujjuaq	2.0	1986	Hydro-Québec Distribution	Diesel	
Kangiqsujuaq	Kangiqsujuaq	1.5	1981	Hydro-Québec Distribution	Diesel	
Kangirsuk	Kangirsuk	1.4	1987	Hydro-Québec Distribution	Diesel	
Kuujjuaq	Kuujjuaq	6.6	2010	Hydro-Québec Distribution	Diesel	
Kuujjuarapik	Kuujjuarapik	3.4	2002	Hydro-Québec Distribution	Diesel	
La Romaine (Note: The community will be connected to the main power grid in 2012. The power plant will be maintained in cold storage.)	La Romaine	5.8	1967	Hydro-Québec Distribution	Diesel	
La Tabatière	La Tabatière	6.8	n/a	Hydro-Québec Distribution	Diesel	
Lac-Robertson	50°59′56″N 59°03′42″W	21.6	1995	Hydro-Québec Distribution	Hydro	
Opitciwan	Opitciwan	4.9	1975	Hydro-Québec Distribution	Diesel	
Port-Menier	Port-Menier	2.8	1992	Hydro-Québec Distribution	Diesel	
Puvirnituk	Puvirnituk	2.9	pre-1981	Hydro-Québec Distribution	Diesel	
Quaqtaq	Quaqtaq	1.1	1987	Hydro-Québec Distribution	Diesel	
Salluit	Salluit	3	1990	Hydro-Québec Distribution	Diesel	
Schefferville (Note: This community is supplied by the Mehinek hydroelectric generating station in Labrador. Diesel generators are used as backups.)	Schefferville	6.8		Hydro-Québec Distribution	Diesel	
St-Augustin	St-Augustin	0.4	n/a	Hydro-Québec Distribution	Diesel	
Tasiujaq	Tasiujaq	0.9	pre-1981	Hydro-Québec Distribution	Diesel	
Umiujaq	Umiujaq	1.1	1988	Hydro-Québec Distribution	Diesel	
Wemotaci (Note: The community was connected to the grid on September 17, 2008. The diesel plant was dismantled.)	Wemotaci	2.2	n/a	Hydro-Québec Distribution	Diesel	

== See also ==
- List of electrical generating stations in Canada
- La Cité de l'Énergie
- List of reservoirs and dams in Canada
