= Outardes-2 =

Outardes-2 generating station
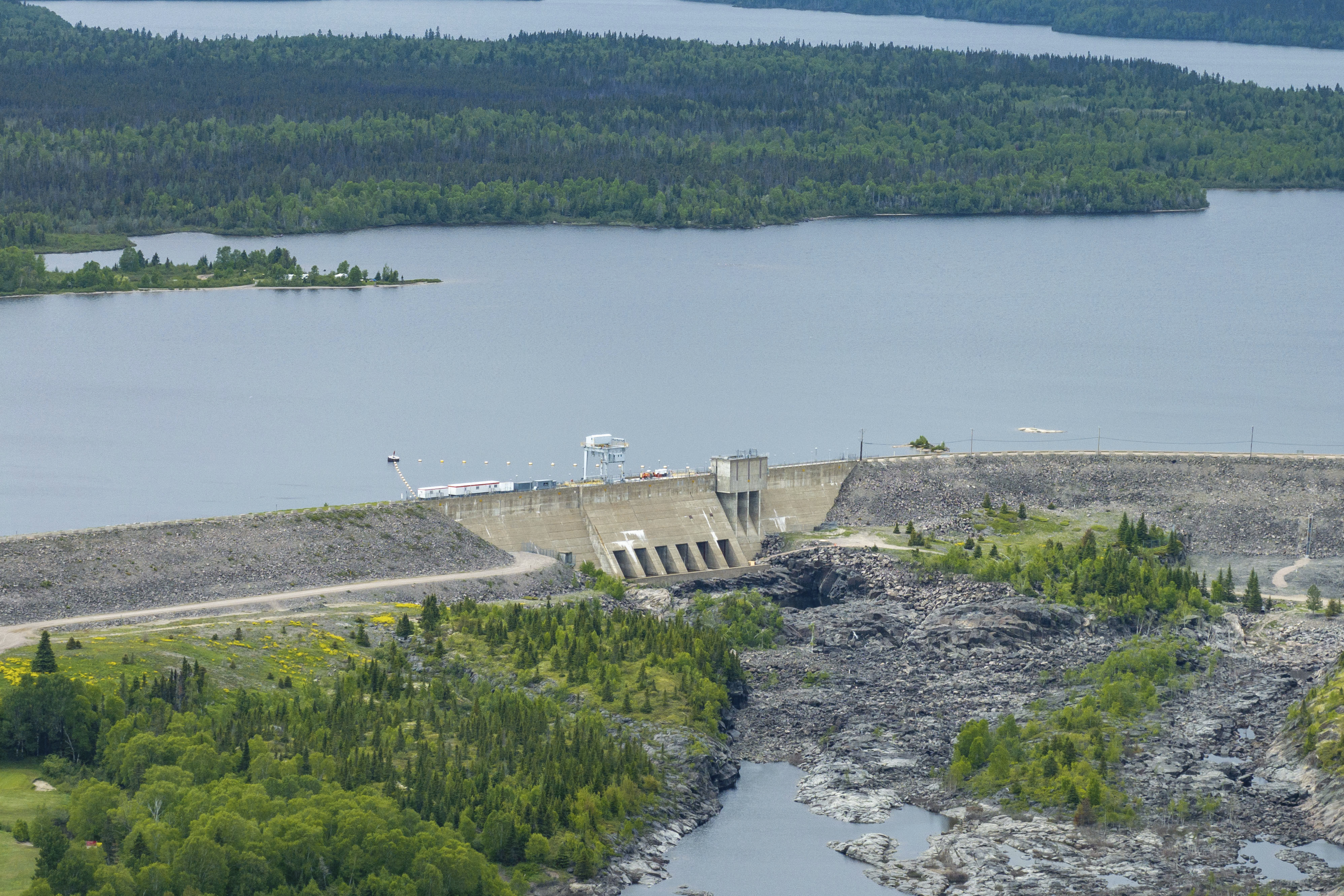
- Outardes-2 generating station in 2026
- Country: Canada
- Location: Pointe-aux-Outardes / Ragueneau, Manicouagan Regional County Municipality, Quebec, near Baie-Comeau
- Coordinates: 49°09′03″N 68°23′23″W
- Status: Operational
- Commission date: 1978
- Owner: Hydro-Québec

Thermal power station
- Turbine technology: Hydroelectric
- Site elevation: 82.3 m (270 ft)

Power generation
- Units operational: 3 x Francis turbines
- Nameplate capacity: 523 MW

Outardes-2 is a hydroelectric power station and dam on the Outardes River 15 km (9.3 mi) southwest of Baie-Comeau, Quebec, Canada. The power station was commissioned in 1978 and is run-of-the-river.

Outardes-2 was built in conjunction with the Manicouagan-Outardes project and is located at the mouth of the Outardes River by Noye Bay. Just west of the power station was another that had been owned and operated by the Quebec North Shore Paper Company since 1937. Instead of raising the reservoir as initially envisioned, Outardes-2 was constructed to better exploit the river flow.

== See also ==
- Outardes-3
- Outardes-4
- McCormick Dam
- Jean-Lesage generating station
- René-Lévesque generating station
- Daniel-Johnson Dam
- History of Hydro-Québec
- List of hydroelectric stations in Quebec
