= Manic-1 =

Hydroelectric dam

Manic-1 generating station
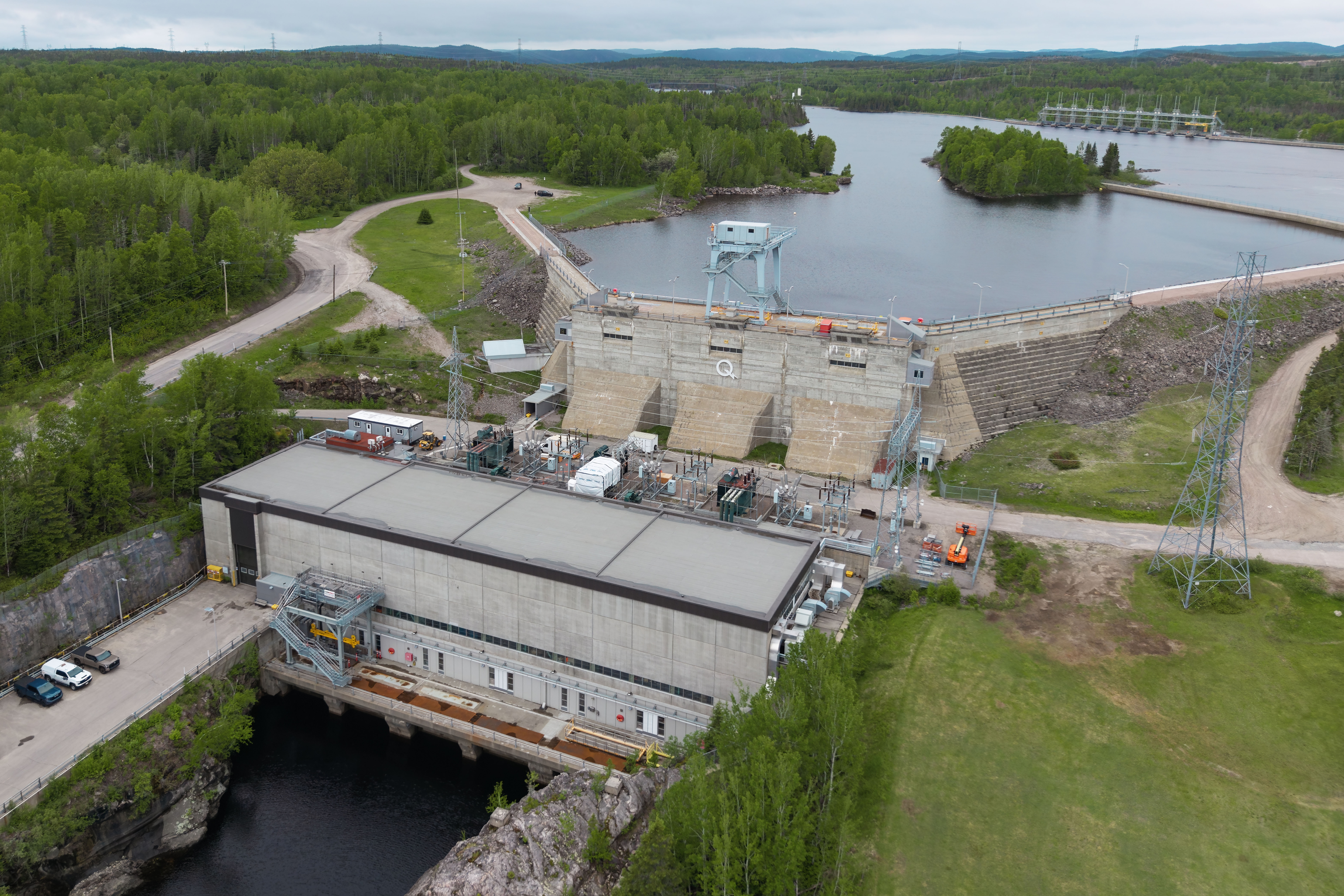
- Country: Canada
- Location: Baie-Comeau
- Coordinates: 49°11′29″N 68°19′46″W
- Commission date: 1966
- Owner: Hydro-Québec

Thermal power station
- Turbine technology: Hydroelectric

Power generation
- Units operational: 3 x 61.3 MW Francis-type
- Nameplate capacity: 184 MW

External links
- Commons: Related media on Commons

Manic-1 is a hydroelectric power station and dam at the mouth of the Manicouagan River 3 km (1.9 mi) west of Baie-Comeau, Quebec, Canada. The power station was commissioned between 1966 and 1967 and producing 184 MW, it is the smallest of the Manicouagan-Outardes project.

== History ==
Between 1949 and 1956, to keep up with increasing electricity demands, the Manicouagan Power Company constructed and upgraded a 126 MW hydroelectric power station on the falls of the Manicouagan River' mouth. Electricity demand continued to rise with the construction of local grain elevators and an aluminum smelter. This power station was further supported and regulated by the McCormick Dam on St. Anne lake which Hydro-Québec had completed by 1959. However, as plans for the Manicouagan-Outardes project progressed, engineers discovered that water flow at the mouth of the Manicouagan could be better utilized. At Hydro-Québec's request, the Manicouagan Power Company further upgraded the McCormick plant's capacity to 190 MW. Additionally, Hydro-Québec decided to build the Manic-1 generating station adjacent to and augmenting the existing plant and dam.

== Characteristics ==
The Manic-1 Dam consists of a concrete center portion that houses the power station and two rock-fill dikes on either side. The western dike is 280 ft (85 m) long while the eastern dike that connects to the McCormick Dam is 370 ft (110 m) long. The tailrace or downstream portion of the dam is a 2,000 ft (610 m) long, 72 ft (22 m) wide and 280 ft (85 m) deep trench that was dug during construction. The power station's hydraulic head is 120 ft (37 m) but can vary between 113 ft (34 m) and 128 ft (39 m) because of sea tides.

At the time of the plant's commission, Manic-1 was expected to operate as a peaker plant, generally run only at times of high demand for electricity, known as peak demand. It was expected to generate 40 gigawatt-hours annually.

== See also ==
- McCormick Dam
- Jean-Lesage generating station
- René-Lévesque generating station
- Daniel-Johnson Dam
- History of Hydro-Québec
- List of hydroelectric stations in Quebec
