= Outardes-4 =

Outardes-4 generating station
- Location within Canada
- Official name: Outardes-4 Dam No.1
- Location: Manicouagan Regional County Municipality, Quebec, Canada
- Coordinates: 49°42′20″N 68°54′21″W
- Owner: Hydro-Québec

Dam and spillways
- Type of dam: Embankment dam
- Impounds: Outardes River
- Height: 437 ft (133 m)
- Length: 2,087 ft (636 m)
- Dam volume: 9,600,000 yd^{3} (7,300,000 m^{3})
- Spillway type: Service, gate controlled

Reservoir
- Creates: Outardes-4 Reservoir
- Total capacity: 24.3 km^{3} (19,700,000 acre⋅ft)
- Surface area: 252 mi^{2} (650 km^{2})

Power Station
- Commission date: 1969
- Type: Conventional
- Turbines: 4 x Francis turbines
- Installed capacity: 785 MW

Outardes-4 is a hydroelectric power station and dam on the Outardes River 70 km (43.5 mi) northwest of Baie-Comeau, Quebec, Canada. The power station was commissioned in 1969 and is supplied by the Outardes-4 Reservoir which is created by seven additional dams.

== Construction ==
Outardes-4 was built in conjunction with the Manicouagan-Outardes project and is the northernmost power station on the Outardes River. Construction on the diversion tunnel for the Outardes River began in September 1964 and was finished in April 1965. A cofferdam was constructed upstream to direct the river into the diversion tunnel; none was built downstream because the river's grade was sufficient. Once the river was diverted, work commenced on Dam No. 1's foundation. Workers and engineers cleared alluvial material from the riverbed but ran into uplift faults and pot-holes. Around six pot-holes with 10 ft (3.0 m) to 15 ft (4.6 m) diameters and up to 60 ft (18 m) deep had to be excavated, partly by hand. Eventually, those under the dam's foundation were filled in with concrete.

== Dams ==
The Outardes-4 Reservoir is impounded by eight different dams. The main dam is Dam No. 1 and is a rock-fill, earthen embankment dam along with Dam No. 2. The six other dams are saddle and auxiliary dams; one is rock and earth-fill, four are earth-fill dikes and one serves as a controlled concrete spillway. Dam No. 1 is 2,087 ft (636 m) long and 437 ft (133 m) high and made of 9,600,000 yd^{3} (7,300,000 m^{3}) of material while the second largest dam, No. 2 is 2,383 ft (726 m) long and 335 ft (102 m) high. Dam No. 2 is located 2 km (1.2 mi) north of No. 1 on a side-valley is made of 6,100,000 yd^{3} (4,700,000 m^{3}) of material. Water from the reservoir helps regulate river flow and power generation at the downstream Outardes-3 and Outardes-2 power stations.

== Power station ==
The Outardes-4 power station is located on the west bank of the Outardes River, adjacent to Dam No. 1. Four 850 ft (260 m) long, 20 ft (6.1 m) wide penstocks deliver water from the reservoir to each of the power station's turbines. The power station was commissioned in 1969 and currently has a 785 MW capacity. The power station's turbines were rehabilitated in 2009 which had increased generation capacity by 56 MW.

== See also ==
- Outardes-2
- Outardes-3
- McCormick Dam
- Jean-Lesage generating station
- René-Lévesque generating station
- Daniel-Johnson Dam
- History of Hydro-Québec
- List of hydroelectric stations in Quebec
