= Outardes-3 =

Outardes-3 generating station
- Location within Canada
- Official name: Outardes-3 generating station
- Location: Manicouagan Regional County Municipality, Quebec, Canada
- Coordinates: 49°33′45″N 68°45′08″W
- Owner: Hydro-Québec

Dam and spillways
- Type of dam: Concrete, gravity
- Impounds: Outardes River
- Height: 250 ft (76 m)
- Spillway type: Service, gate controlled

Power Station
- Commission date: 1969
- Type: Run-of-the-river
- Turbines: 4 x Francis turbines
- Installed capacity: 1026 MW

Outardes-3 is a hydroelectric power station and dam on the Outardes River 55 km (34.2 mi) northwest of Baie-Comeau, Quebec, Canada. The power station was commissioned in 1969 and is run-of-the-river.

Outardes-3 was built in conjunction with the Manicouagan-Outardes project and is located 13 mi (20.9 km) downstream of Outardes-4. Only a 250 ft (76.2 m) high concrete dam was needed to exploit 478 ft (145.7 m) of hydraulic head as the dam raised up water into the existing Lake Tirebouchon. Raising the water in the lake allowed it to rise east near the actual power station 4.5 mi (7.2 km) downstream. Near the eastern portion of the lake, two depressions were filled in with small dikes to withhold the higher lake level, one of which supports a concrete spillway. From the intake on the northern portion of the concrete dam, water is fed via four 750 ft (228.6 m) penstocks towards the underground power station. Water being discharged from the power station enters a 1,488 ft (453.5 m) long and 73 ft (22.3 m) high tunnel before being returned to the river.

== See also ==
- List of largest power stations in Canada
- List of hydroelectric stations in Quebec
- Outardes-2
- McCormick Dam
- Jean-Lesage generating station
- René-Lévesque generating station
- Daniel-Johnson Dam
