= List of hydroelectric power stations in the United States =

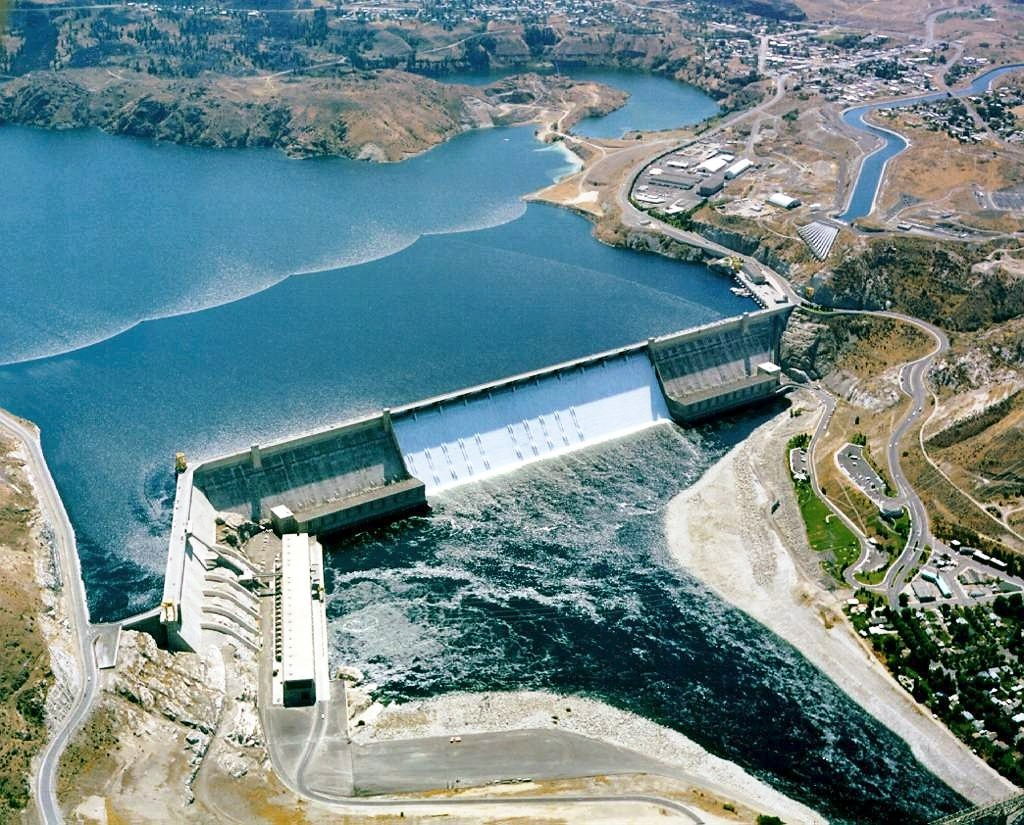
Grand Coulee Dam, the largest hydroelectric power station in North America

This is a list of operational hydroelectric power stations in the United States with a current nameplate capacity of at least 100 MW.

The Hoover Dam in Arizona and Nevada was the first hydroelectric power station in the United States to have a capacity of at least 1,000 MW upon completion in 1936. Since then numerous other hydroelectric power stations have surpassed the 1,000 MW threshold, most often through the expansion of existing hydroelectric facilities. All but two states of the United States are home to at least one hydroelectric power station; those without being Delaware and Mississippi.

== List of power stations ==
Name	State	Coordinates	Capacity (MW)	Annual generation (GWh)	Owner	Type	Ref
Bad Creek	South Carolina	35°00′24″N 82°59′40″W	1,064		Duke Energy	Pumped-storage	
Bartletts Ferry	Alabama	32°39′47″N 85°05′28″W	173	624 (2020)	Georgia Power	Reservoir	
Bath County	Virginia	38°13′50″N 79°49′10″W	3,003	-983 (2018)	Dominion Energy (60%); Bath County Energy (24%); Allegheny Energy (16%)	Pumped-storage	
Bear Swamp	Massachusetts	42°41′06″N 72°58′36″W	600	-164 (2019)	National Grid	Pumped-storage	
Big Bend	South Dakota	44°02′58″N 99°26′55″W	494	1,193 (2018)	U.S. Army Corps of Engineers	Reservoir	
Big Creek	California	37°12′17″N 119°14′23″W	1,050		Southern California Edison	Pumped-storage	
Blenheim–Gilboa	New York	42°27′18″N 74°27′29″W	1,134		New York Power Authority	Pumped-storage	
Bonneville	Oregon; Washington	45°38′39″N 121°56′26″W	1,227	4,860 (2018)	U.S. Army Corps of Engineers	Run-of-the-river	
Boundary	Washington	48°59′14″N 117°20′51″W	1,003	4,004 (2018)	Seattle City Light	Reservoir	
Brownlee	Idaho; Oregon	44°50′10″N 116°54′00″W	585	2,419 (2018)	Idaho Power	Reservoir	
Bull Shoals	Arkansas	36°21′58″N 92°34′29″W	391	884 (2022)	U.S. Army Corps of Engineers	Reservoir	
Carters	Georgia	34°36′55″N 84°40′26″W	600		U.S. Army Corps of Engineers	Pumped-storage	
Castaic	California	34°35′14″N 118°39′24″W	1,500	232 (2018)	CDWR (50%); LADWP (50%)	Pumped-storage	
Chief Joseph	Washington	47°59′43″N 119°38′00″W	2,620	12,352 (2018)	U.S. Army Corps of Engineers	Run-of-the-river	
Comerford	New Hampshire		165.9	417 (2019)	Great River Hydro		
Conowingo	Maryland	39°39′36″N 76°10′26″W	548	2,788 (2018)	Exelon	Run-of-the-river	
The Dalles	Oregon; Washington	45°36′44″N 121°08′04″W	1,813	7,161 (2018)	U.S. Army Corps of Engineers	Run-of-the-river	
Davis Dam	Arizona; Nevada	35°11′56″N 114°34′10″W	255	1,103 (2018)	U.S. Bureau of Reclamation	Reservoir	
Devil Canyon Project	California	34°12′20″N 117°20′05″W	276.2	787 (2018)	CDWR	Reservoir	
Diablo	Washington	48°42′51″N 121°08′35″W	129	689.4 (2009)	Seattle City Light	Reservoir	
Dworshak	Idaho	46°30′54″N 116°17′46″W	400	1,598 (2018)	U.S. Army Corps of Engineers	Reservoir	
Fontana	North Carolina	35°27′8″N 83°48′17″W	304	1,151 (2018)	Tennessee Valley Authority	Reservoir	
Fort Randall	South Dakota	43°04′00″N 98°33′14″W	320	1,725 (2018)	U.S. Army Corps of Engineers	Reservoir	
Garrison	North Dakota	47°29′55″N 101°24′43″W	614	3,180 (2018)	U.S. Army Corps of Engineers	Reservoir	
Glen Canyon	Arizona	36°56′15″N 111°29′04″W	1,320	3,959 (2018)	U.S. Bureau of Reclamation	Reservoir	
Gorge	Washington	48°41′52″N 121°12′30″W	199.2		Seattle City Light	Reservoir	
Grand Coulee	Washington	47°57′21″N 118°58′54″W	6,809	21,043 (2018)	U.S. Bureau of Reclamation	Reservoir (95.4%); Pumped-storage (4.6%)	
Great Lakes Hydro	Maine		138	723 (2019)	Great Lakes Hydro America		
Hartwell	Georgia	34°21′28″N 82°49′17″W	421		U.S. Army Corps of Engineers	Reservoir	
Hells Canyon	Idaho; Oregon	45°14′41″N 116°41′54″W	391.5	2,195 (2018)	Idaho Power Company	Reservoir	
Helms	California	37°02′13″N 118°57′53″W	1,212	-413 (2018)	PG&E	Pumped-storage	
Hoover	Arizona; Nevada	36°0′56″N 114°44′16″W	2,080	3,542 (2018)	U.S. Bureau of Reclamation	Reservoir	
Hungry Horse	Montana	48°20′28″N 114°00′50″W	428	999 (2018)	U.S. Bureau of Reclamation	Reservoir	
Ice Harbor	Washington	46°14′58″N 118°52′47″W	603	1,711 (2018)	U.S. Army Corps of Engineers	Run-of-the-river	
J. Strom Thurmond	Georgia	33°39′39″N 82°11′59″W	380		U.S. Army Corps of Engineers	Reservoir	
Jocassee	South Carolina	34°0′57″N 82°55′05″W	710		Duke Energy	Pumped-storage	
John Day	Oregon; Washington	45°42′59″N 120°41′40″W	2,160	9,193 (2018)	U.S. Army Corps of Engineers	Run-of-the-river	
Lay	Alabama	32°57′49″N 86°31′00″W	177	703 (2022)	Alabama Power	Reservoir	
Lewis Smith	Alabama	33°56′32″N 87°06′21″W	181	219 (2024)	Alabama Power	Reservoir	
Libby	Montana	48°24′36″N 115°18′50″W	600	2,056 (2018)	U.S. Army Corps of Engineers	Reservoir	
Little Goose	Washington	46°35′15″N 118°01′34″W	810	2,452 (2018)	U.S. Army Corps of Engineers	Run-of-the-river	
Lower Baker	Washington	48°32′51″N 121°44′28″W	111		Puget Sound Energy	Reservoir	
Lower Granite	Washington	46°39′38″N 117°25′41″W	810	2,467 (2018)	U.S. Army Corps of Engineers	Run-of-the-river	
Lower Monumental	Washington	46°33′47″N 118°32′20″W	810	2,383 (2018)	U.S. Army Corps of Engineers	Run-of-the-river	
Ludington	Michigan	43°53′37″N 86°26′43″W	2,172	-698 (2018)	Consumers Energy (51%); DTE Electric (49%)	Pumped-storage	
Martin	Alabama	32°40′49″N 85°54′39″W	211	412 (2021)	Alabama Power	Reservoir	
McNary	Oregon; Washington	45°55′47″N 119°17′46″W	986	69 (2018)	U.S. Army Corps of Engineers	Run-of-the-river	
Mossyrock	Washington	46°32′04″N 122°25′29″W	378.4	908 (2018)	Tacoma Power	Reservoir	
Muddy Run	Pennsylvania	39°50′49″N 76°17′29″W	1,072		Exelon	Pumped-storage	
New Bullards Bar	California	39°23′36″N 121°08′35″W	315	1,091 (2018)	Yuba County Water Agency	Reservoir	
New Melones	California	37°56′50″N 120°31′41″W	300	418 (2012)	U.S. Bureau of Reclamation	Reservoir	
Northfield Mountain	Massachusetts	42°36′39″N 72°28′17″W	1,168	-273 (2019)	FirstLight	Pumped-storage	
Noxon Rapids	Montana	47°57′39″N 115°44′01″W	527	1,841 (2018)	Avista	Reservoir	
Oahe	South Dakota	44°27′07″N 100°23′57″W	786	3,346 (2018)	U.S. Army Corps of Engineers	Reservoir	
Oroville	California	39°32′20″N 121°29′08″W	644	1,291 (2018)	CDWR	Reservoir	
Priest Rapids	Washington	46°38′35″N 119°54′34″W	955	4,737 (2018)	Grant County PUD	Reservoir	
Raccoon Mountain	Tennessee	35°2′54″N 85°23′48″W	1,616	-620 (2018)	Tennessee Valley Authority	Pumped-storage	
Richard B. Russell	Georgia; South Carolina	34°01′30″N 82°35′39″W	600		U.S. Army Corps of Engineers	Pumped-storage	
Robert Moses Niagara	New York	43°08′35″N 79°02′23″W	2,675	16,773 (2018)	New York Power Authority	Reservoir	
Rock Island	Washington	47°20′32″N 120°05′41″W	622.5	2,652 (2018)	Chelan County PUD	Reservoir	
Rocky Mountain	Georgia	34°21′20″N 85°18′14″W	1,095		Oglethorpe Power (75%); Georgia Power (25%)	Pumped-storage	
Rocky Reach	Washington	47°32′00″N 120°17′44″W	1,347	6,287 (2018)	Chelan County PUD	Reservoir	
Ross	Washington	48°43′54″N 121°04′02″W	460	619.12 (2018)	Seattle City Light	Reservoir	
Round Butte	Oregon	44°36′11″N 121°16′40″W	367	835 (2018)	Portland General Electric	Reservoir	
Safe Harbor	Pennsylvania	39°55′14″N 76°23′33″W	422.5		SHWP	Reservoir	
Salina	Oklahoma	36°15′55″N 95°06′15″W	259	-135 (2018)	Grand River Dam Authority	Pumped-storage	
S. C. Moore	New Hampshire		190.8	336 (2019)	Great River Hydro		
Seneca	Pennsylvania	41°50′21″N 79°0′14″W	435		LS Power	Pumped-storage	
Shasta	California	40°43′07″N 122°25′08″W	714	1,739 (2018)	U.S. Bureau of Reclamation	Reservoir	
SKQ	Montana	47°40′36″N 114°14′03″W	208	1,100 (2024)	Confederated Salish and Kootenai Tribes	Reservoir	
Smith Mountain	Virginia	37°02′28″N 79°32′08″W	560		American Electric Power	Pumped-storage	
St. Lawrence-FDR	New York	45°00′23″N 74°47′42″W	912	7,640 (2018)	New York Power Authority	Reservoir	
Swift	Washington	46°3′47″N 122°11′52″W	240	519.481	PacifiCorp	Reservoir	
Taum Sauk	Missouri	37°32′08″N 90°49′05″W	450		Ameren Missouri	Pumped-storage	
Upper Baker	Washington	48°38′56″N 121°41′27″W	107		Puget Sound Energy	Reservoir	
Walter Bouldin	Alabama	32°35′03″N 86°16′57″W	225	555 (2020)	Alabama Power	Reservoir	
Wanapum	Washington	46°52′31″N 119°58′16″W	1,185	5,338 (2018)	Grant County PUD	Reservoir	
Wells	Washington	47°56′43″N 119°51′58″W	774	4,439 (2018)	Douglas County PUD	Reservoir	
Wheeler	Alabama	34°48′25″N 87°22′55″W	402	1,624 (2018)	Tennessee Valley Authority	Reservoir	
White Rock	California	38°45′54″N 120°47′14″W	266.5	389 (2018)	SMUD	Reservoir	
William R. Gianelli	California	37°03′33″N 121°04′29″W	424	-126 (2018)	CDWR; U.S. Bureau of Reclamation	Pumped-storage	
Wilson	Alabama	34°48′03″N 87°37′33″W	653	2,923 (2018)	Tennessee Valley Authority	Reservoir	
Wolf Creek	Kentucky	36.8683°N 85.1475°W	270	800	U.S. Army Corps of Engineers	Reservoir	
Yale	Washington	45°57′51″N 122°19′57″W	134		PacifiCorp	Reservoir	
Yards Creek	New Jersey	41°0′3″N 75°1′54″W	453	-115 (2018)	FirstEnergy; PSEG	Pumped-storage	
Flaming Gorge Dam	Utah	40°54′52″N 109°25′17″W	150	500	U.S. Bureau of Reclamation	Reservoir	
Parker dam	Arizona	34°17′47″N 114°08′23″W	120	457	U.S. Bureau of Reclamation	Reservoir	
Saint Marys Falls Hydropower Plant	Michigan	46°29′51″N 84°19′56″W	36	225	Cloverland Electric Cooperative	Run-of-the-river	
Lake Byllesby Dam	Minnesota	44°30′43″N 92°56′24″W	4		Dakota County		

=== Under construction ===
This is a list of hydroelectric power stations under construction with an expected nameplate capacity of at least 100 MW.

Name	State	Coordinates	Capacity (MW)	Annual generation (GWh)	Owner	Type	Year	Ref
Gordon Butte	Montana	46°25′07″N 110°22′20″W	400	1,300	Absaroka Energy	Pumped-storage		

== See also ==
- List of power stations in the United States by type
- List of pumped-storage hydroelectric power stations
- List of hydroelectric power stations in Canada
