= Lake Plétipi =

Lake in Quebec, Canada

- Location within Quebec
- Location: Mont-Valin, Le Fjord-du-Saguenay Regional County Municipality / Rivière-Mouchalagane, Caniapiscau Regional County Municipality, Quebec
- Coordinates: 51°43′N 70°6′W
- Basin countries: Canada
- Surface area: 339 km^{2} (131 sq mi)

Lake Plétipi is an irregularly shaped lake in central Quebec, Canada. It is fed by and drains into the Rivière aux Outardes. The lake is approximately 60 km WNW of the huge impact crater known as Lake Manicouagan and 80 km from the nearest road. It, nearby Lakes Matonipi and Matonipis, and their surrounding region have been proposed as a biodiversity reserve under the Natural Heritage Conservation Act of Canada. At one time, the Betsiamites, a subset of the Naskapi peoples, used to hunt in the area.
