= McCormick generating station =

Hydroelectric power station in Quebec

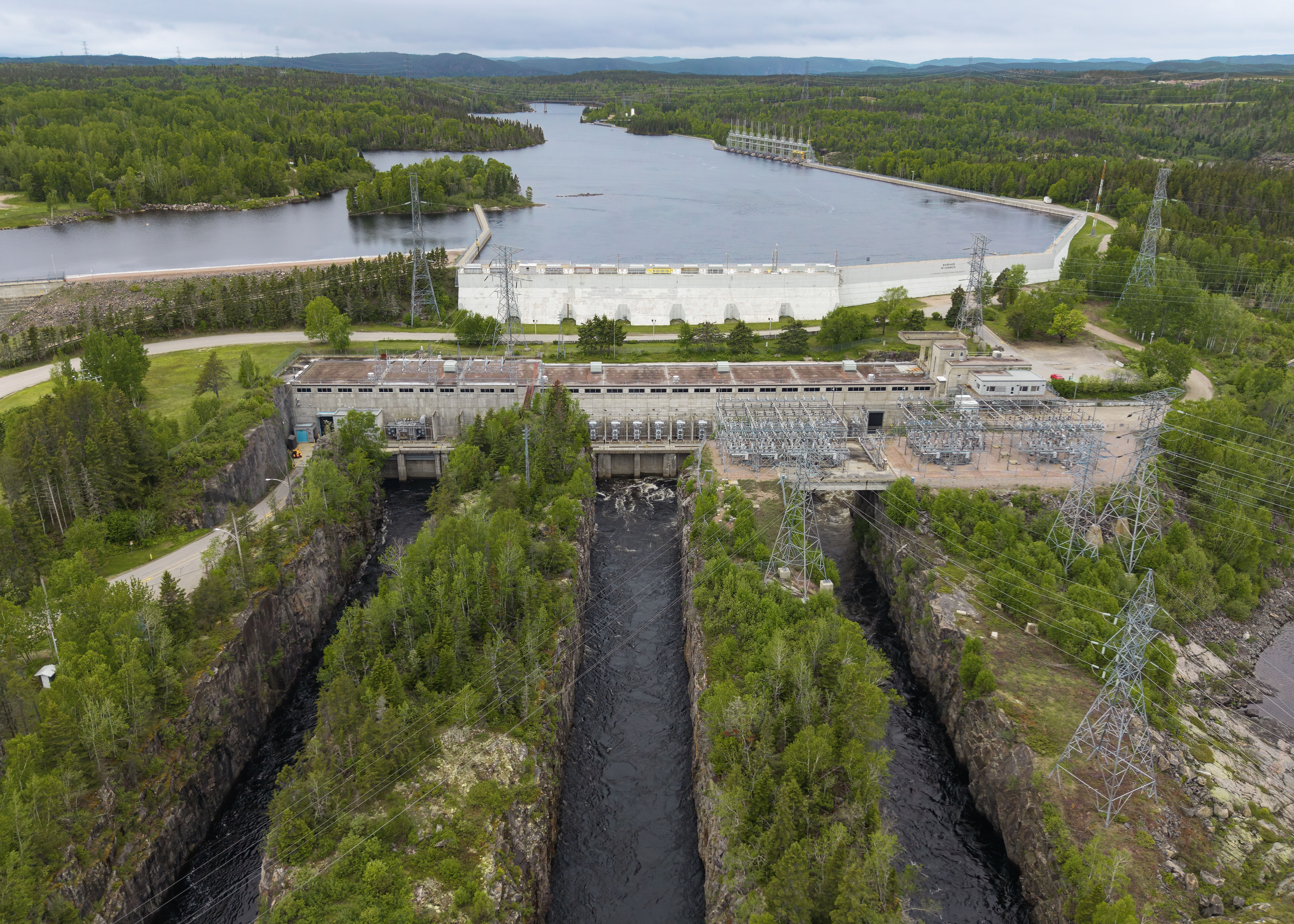
- Country: Canada
- Location: Baie-Comeau
- Coordinates: 49°11′35″N 68°19′37″W
- Commission date: 1952
- Owners: Hydro-Québec 60% Alcoa 40%

Thermal power station
- Turbine technology: Hydroelectric

Power generation
- Units operational: 8 x Francis turbines
- Nameplate capacity: 335 MW

The McCormick generating station is a dam and power station built on the Manicouagan river by the Quebec & Ontario Paper Company and the Canadian British Aluminium Company 3 km (1.9 mi) west of Baie-Comeau, Quebec, Canada. It is named after colonel Robert R. McCormick (1880–1955), who owned and published the Chicago Tribune.

At the time of its commissioning in 1952, the plant contained two 55,000-hp (41.8 MW) turbines, which provided power to the paper mill, then owned by the American newspaper.

The McCormick plant sits next to Hydro-Québec's Manic-1 generating station and the two plants share the same reservoir. Its installed capacity has expanded over time to its current 335 MW capacity.

== History ==
As early as 1955, the Manicouagan Power Company planned its first expansion by adding three 60,000 h.p. (44.8 MW) turbines, increasing the rated capacity to 292,400 h.p. (218 MW). The plant expansion was facilitated by a C$29 million regulation dam built by Hydro-Québec downstream from Sainte-Anne Lake, on the Toulnustouc River and the upgraded facility was completed in 1959. Subsequently, two additional 62.5-MW units were installed at the station in 1964, bringing the total installed capacity to 343 MW. Various upgrade projects have increased the installed capacity to 379 MW.

For over 50 years, McCormick generated power for the Baie-Comeau pulp and paper and aluminium smelting operations of its two shareholders, AbitibiBowater (60%) and Alcoa (40%). As a self generation facility, the private plant was exempt from the nationalization of the Quebec electric industry under the Hydro-Québec umbrella in 1962-1963.

Forced to reorganize under bankruptcy protection, AbitibiBowater was forced to sell its 60% share of the plant to a subsidiary of Hydro-Québec, HQ Manicouagan. The C$615 million transaction was completed in December 2009.

== See also ==
- Manic-1
- Jean-Lesage generating station
- René-Lévesque generating station
- Daniel-Johnson Dam
- History of Hydro-Québec
- List of hydroelectric stations in Quebec
