= Pointe-aux-Outardes =

- Village municipality
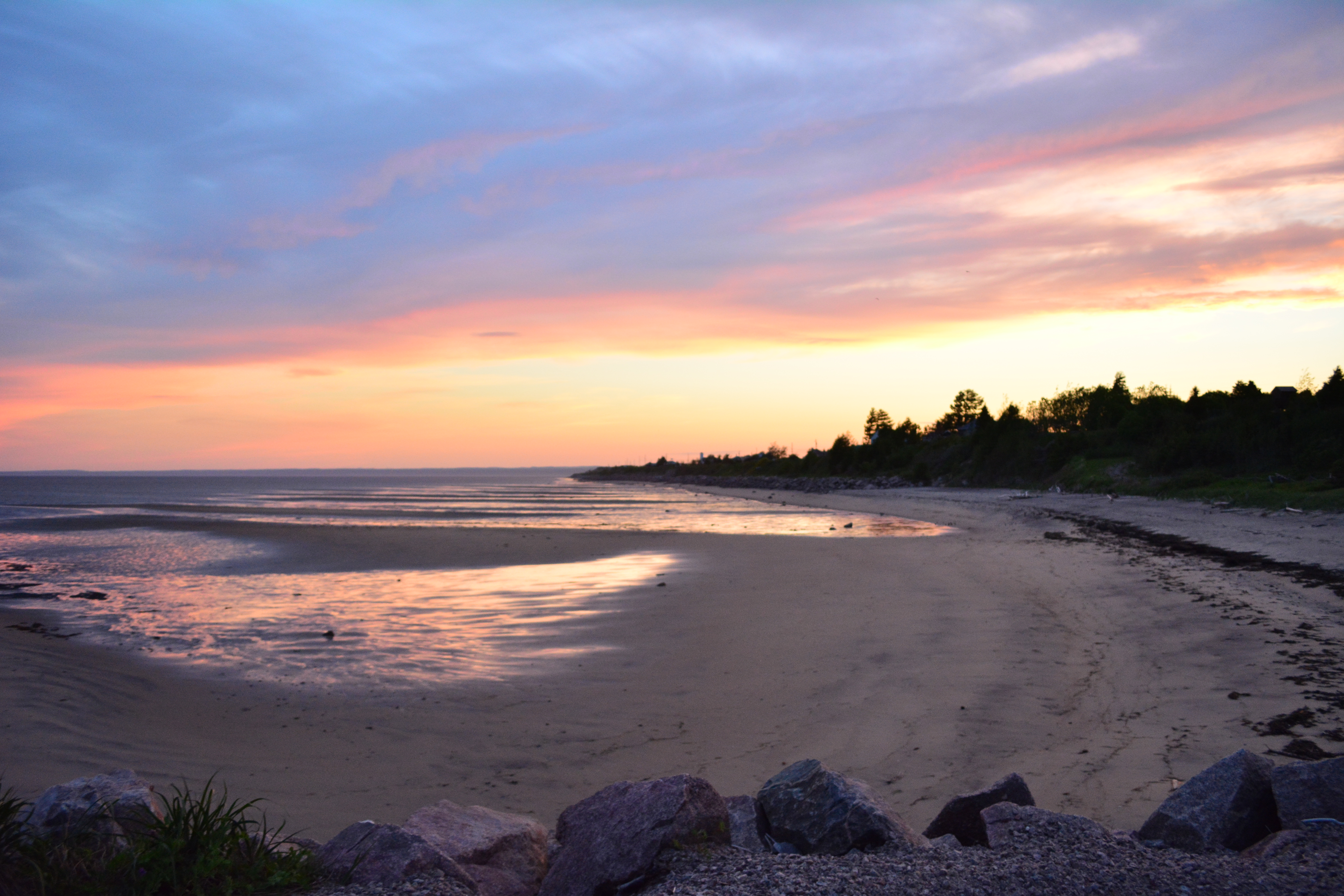
- Beach of Pointe-aux-Outardes

- Location in Côte-Nord region of Quebec
- Coordinates: 49°03′N 68°26′W
- Country: Canada
- Province: Quebec
- Region: Côte-Nord
- RCM: Manicouagan
- Constituted: January 1, 1964

Government
  - Mayor: Julien Normand
  - Federal riding: Côte-Nord—Kawawachikamach—Nitassinan
  - Prov. riding: René-Lévesque

Area
  - Total: 112.34 km^{2} (43.37 sq mi)
  - Land: 75.19 km^{2} (29.03 sq mi)

Population (2021)
  - Total: 1,434
  - Density: 19.1/km^{2} (49/sq mi)
  - Pop (2016-21): ▲7.7%
  - Dwellings: 710
- Time zone: UTC−5 (EST)
  - Summer (DST): UTC−4 (EDT)
- Postal code(s): G0H 1M0
- Area codes: 418 and 581
- Highways: R-138
- Website: www.pointe-aux-outardes.ca

Pointe-aux-Outardes (French pronunciation: [pwɛ̃t oz‿utaʁd]) is a village municipality in Quebec, Canada, on the southern point of the Manicouagan Peninsula between the mouths of the Outardes and Manicouagan Rivers.

The place is named after a piece of land that juts out into the Saint Lawrence River and partially encloses the Outardes Bay: Pointe aux Outardes. It literally means "Point of Bustards", but Outarde can also be translated as "Canada goose". In fact, Canada geese and snow geese use the nearby Manicouagan River as a corridor in their annual migration and stopover at the point. The Innu called it Piletipistu Neshkâu, meaning "point of the Partridge River". But the term Outardes was used on Guérard's map of 1631 and on Franquelin's map of 1685 to identify the river that flows past the point into the St. Lawrence.

Pointe-aux-Outardes is exceptionally rich in flora and fauna. Among its salt marshes, more than 175 species of birds have been counted.

== Demographics ==
In the 2021 Census of Population conducted by Statistics Canada, Pointe-aux-Outardes had a population of 1,434 living in 641 of its 710 total private dwellings, a change of 7.7% from its 2016 population of 1,332. With a land area of 75.19 km^{2} (29.03 sq mi), it had a population density of 19.1/km^{2} (49.4/sq mi) in 2021.

Historical census populations – Pointe-aux-Outardes

Year	Pop.	±%
1966	826	—
1971	836	+1.2%
1976	968	+15.8%
1981	1,056	+9.1%
1986	1,032	−2.3%
1991	1,109	+7.5%

Year	Pop.	±%
1996	1,339	+20.7%
2001	1,413	+5.5%
2006	1,443	+2.1%
2011	1,330	−7.8%
2016	1,332	+0.2%
2021	1,434	+7.7%

Source: Statistics Canada

Mother tongue (2021):

- English as first language: 0%
- French as first language: 99.3%
- English and French as first language: 0%
- Other as first language: 0.4%
