= Rivière aux Outardes (North Shore) =

Outardes River Rivière aux Outardes
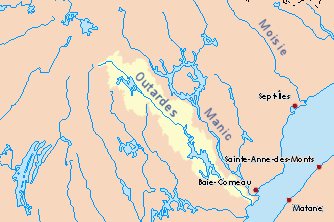
- Drainage basin in yellow

Location
- Country: Canada
- Province: Quebec
- Region: Saguenay–Lac-Saint-Jean, Côte-Nord

Physical characteristics
- Source: Unnamed wilderness, about 20 km (12 mi) south of the Otish Mts.
  - location: Mont-Valin
  - coordinates: 52°04′22″N 70°33′30″W
- Mouth: Saint Lawrence River
  - location: Pointe-aux-Outardes
  - coordinates: 49°03′43″N 68°27′58″W
  - elevation: 0 m (0 ft)
- Length: 499 km (310 mi)
- Basin size: 19,000 km^{2} (7,300 sq mi)
- Discharge
  - average: 400 m^{3}/s (14,000 cu ft/s)

The Rivière aux Outardes (French pronunciation: [ʁivjɛʁ oz‿utaʁd]) or Outardes River is a river in Quebec, Canada. The river originates in the Otish Mountains, and flows in a southerly direction for its entire course. It passes through Lake Plétipi and Burnt Islands Lake (Îles Brûlées), and widens about midway to form the large Outardes 4 Reservoir. It drains into Outardes Bay of the Saint Lawrence River, about 20 kilometers (12 mi) southwest of Baie-Comeau.

At its mouth, the Outardes River widens and flows over a sandbar, making it extremely shallow. There are several islands in Outardes Bay of which the most notable are White Island (île Blanche), a rock of white granite 23 meters (75 ft) high, and Mine Island (île de la Mine), a bare red rock reaching 15 meters (49 ft) high.

The river was first called Cane or Caen River by Jean Alfonse in 1544. The name riviere aux Outardes came in use following its appearance on maps by Jacques-Nicolas Bellin in 1744 and 1764. English maps from the end of the 18th century and early 19th century would show "Bustard River", as a translation of the archaic French word bistarde or oustarde. Today outardes is the Canadian French word for Canada geese. The indigenous Innu called the river Pirebistibit, Peritibistokou, Pletipishtuk, or Piletipîstuk Shipu which means "partridge river".

Among its significant tributaries are:

- Silver River (Rivière à l'argent)
  - Villéon River
- Long Wood River (Rivière du Bois Long)
- Matonipi River

The river has been developed for hydro-electric power generation as part of the Manic-Outardes Project in the 1960s and 1970s. There are three power plants:

- Outardes-2 - near the mouth of the river at Chute-aux-Outardes
- Outardes-3
- Outardes-4
