= Daniel-Johnson dam =

Daniel-Johnson dam Barrage Daniel-Johnson
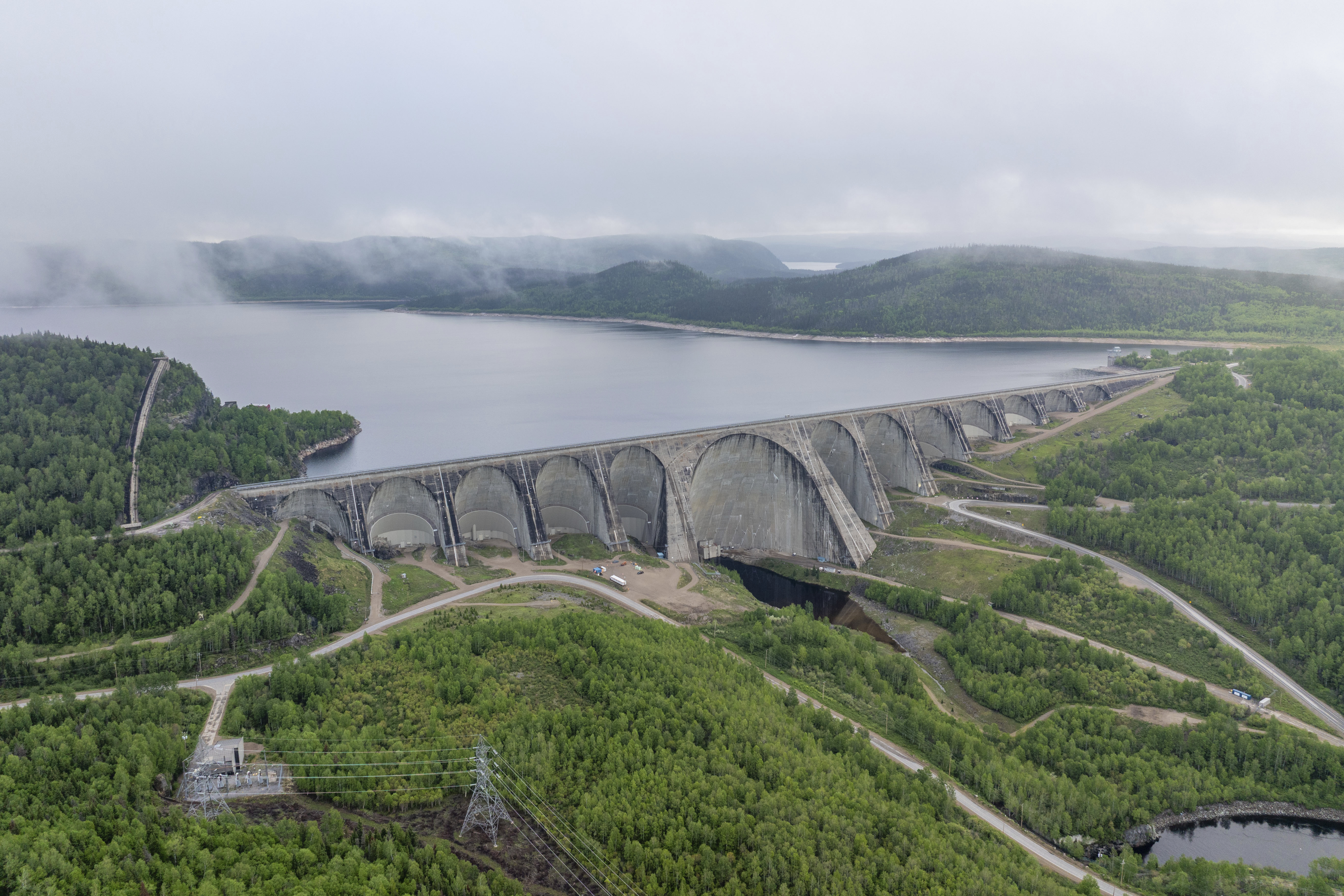
- Daniel-Johnson dam in 2026

- Location within Quebec
- Interactive map of Daniel-Johnson dam Barrage Daniel-Johnson
- Location: Manicouagan Regional County Municipality, Quebec, Canada
- Coordinates: 50°38′48″N 68°43′28″W
- Construction began: 1959; 67 years ago
- Opening date: 1970; 56 years ago
- Owner: Hydro-Québec

Dam and spillways
- Type of dam: Concrete, multiple-arch buttress
- Impounds: Manicouagan River
- Height: 214 m (702 ft)
- Length: 1,314 m (4,311 ft)
- Width (crest): 3 m (10 ft)
- Width (base): 22.5 m (74 ft)
- Dam volume: 2,200,000 m^{3} (2,900,000 yd^{3})
- Spillway type: Service, gate-controlled

Reservoir
- Creates: Manicouagan Reservoir
- Total capacity: 142 km^{3} (115,000,000 acre⋅ft)
- Catchment area: 29,241 km^{2} (11,290 mi^{2})
- Surface area: 1,950 km^{2} (753 mi^{2})

Power Station
- Operator: Hydro-Québec
- Commission date: 1970-71 (Manic-5); 1989-90 (Manic-5-PA)
- Turbines: 8 x 199.5 MW Francis-type (Manic-5); 4 x 266 MW Francis-type (Manic-5-PA)
- Installed capacity: 1,596 MW (Manic-5); 1,064 MW (Manic-5-PA)

The Daniel-Johnson dam (French: Barrage Daniel-Johnson), formerly known as Manicouagan 5 (abbreviated as Manic-5), is a multiple-arch buttress dam on the Manicouagan River that creates the annular Manicouagan Reservoir. The dam is composed of 14 buttresses and 13 arches and is 214 km (133 mi) north of Baie-Comeau in Quebec, Canada. The dam was constructed between 1959 and 1970 for the purpose of hydroelectric power production and supplies water to the Manic-5 and Manic-5-PA power houses with a combined capacity of 2,660 MW. The dam is 214 m (702 ft) tall, 1,314 m (4,311 ft) long and contains 2,200,000 m^{3} (2,900,000 yd^{3}) of concrete, making it the largest dam of its type in the world.

The dam was named after Daniel Johnson Sr., the 20th premier of Quebec, responsible for starting the project while serving as a minister in Duplessis's government. (Note: The hyphen added to Johnson's full name is standard in French-language toponyms, here clarifying that the whole name is an adjective applying to Barrage (dam) in Barrage Daniel-Johnson.) Johnson died on 26 September 1968, the day he was to preside over the scheduled inauguration of the dam. The facility is owned and operated by Hydro-Québec.

== Background ==
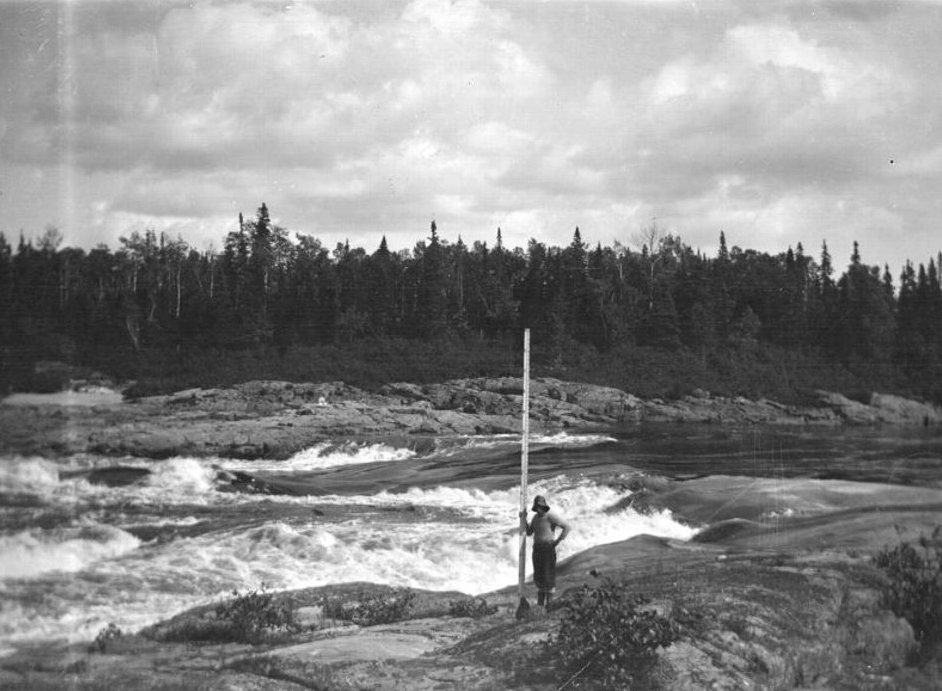
A hydrological survey was conducted on the Manicouagan river in 1919.

During the summers of 1919 and 1920, hydrological studies were conducted on the Manicouagan and Outardes rivers, flowing into the St. Lawrence near the town of Baie-Comeau. The combined flow was then estimated at 40 million cubic meters, making it one of the largest hydrological systems in Canada. Although harnessing of this potential was considered interesting, its distance from major load centres and the lack of roads in the area were identified as major drawbacks, and building dams in the wilderness was considered too costly.

After the Second World War, the discovery of large iron deposits on the North Shore and the increased forestry activity led to a rapid development of the region. The area's largest cities, Sept-Îles and Baie-Comeau, were now linked to the rest of the province by a road. At the same time, industrial development in southern Quebec required a larger electric supply. Improvements in long-distance electric transmission technologies became significant, with construction of two 315-kilovolt lines, between the Bersimis complex, west of the Manicouagan system, and Montreal, (completed in 1956) lifting another obstacle.

In 1955, Hydro-Québec launched a 5-year extensive assessment of the Manicouagan's suitability. These studies demonstrated the exceptional potential of the river and stressed the advantages of building a multi-dam system in order take full advantage of the terrain and water flows. The data collected at the time was so promising that Hydro-Québec did not wait for the working group to submit their final recommendations. By 1959, a decision was made and construction of a 210 kilometres (130 mi) access road from Baie-Comeau was started. The original project, the Manicouagan-Outardes project, included the construction of five dams on the Manicouagan River (Manic-1, Manic-2, Manic-3, Manic-4 and Manic-5) and three on the Outardes River (Outardes-2, Outardes-3 and Outardes-4). However, a miscalculation prevented the construction of the Manic-4 dam and powerhouse because engineers realized early on that it would encroach on the Manic-3 reservoir.

In 1959, the premier of Quebec, Maurice Duplessis, wanted a US firm to construct the dam but Quebec's Minister of Water Resources at the time, Daniel Johnson was against the idea. Johnson believed that the skill of a Canadian firm and workers was well suited for the construction of such a complex dam. Duplessis' successor in 1959, Paul Sauvé agreed with Johnson and he continued to pave the way for the dam. Eventually, engineers would choose André Coyne's design for a multiple arch buttress dam as the most suitable and economical.

== Construction ==
Construction on the dam's support facilities began in 1959 and the river diversion tunnels and foundation preparation commenced in 1960. To divert the Manicouagan River, workers blasted and dug two 2,000 ft (610 m) long and 45 ft (14 m) diameter tunnels through the gorge's solid granite west wall. Workers used "jumbo" drilling platforms and the tunnels progressed 14 ft (4.3 m) each shift. To facilitate the river's diversion, two cofferdams were built. The first was a concrete arch upstream from the dam site which would block the river, forcing it into the diversion tunnels. The second cofferdam was downstream and prevented water from flowing back into the construction site. Each cofferdam was built on alluvial deposits (loose soil), so they needed to be watertight, which was accomplished with either a grout curtain or deep supporting piles. Once the river was diverted, workers pumped the remaining water out between the two cofferdams in order to prepare the site for construction. Once drained, workers excavated the alluvial deposits between the cofferdams, creating a long pit that was 150 ft (46 m) deep at the centre. This pit was then filled with concrete in the summer of 1962. To prevent seepage in the dam's foundation, a grout curtain was injected in the bedrock and a drainage network with 2,400 ft (730 m) of tunnels was constructed just downstream of the dam to collect water that might seep through.

After the extensive preparatory works were complete, the first concrete for the dam was poured on October 3, 1962. Concrete was poured day and night, but was halted during the winter because of freezing temperatures. To organize the pouring, the dam was split into 45 ft (14 m) plots and each was raised about five or six feet at a time. Workers had about 150 days — before seasonal flooding — to construct the dam to a height of at least 250 ft (76 m). Before flooding began, engineers planned to seal the diversion tunnels and begin filling the reservoir. To speed the pouring process, concrete was poured in casts by buckets that moved along three cableways suspended above the construction site. The deadline was met within the 150 days and a total of 1,000,000 yd^{3} (760,000 m^{3}) of concrete was poured. The dam was eventually completed in 1968.

== Dedication and naming ==
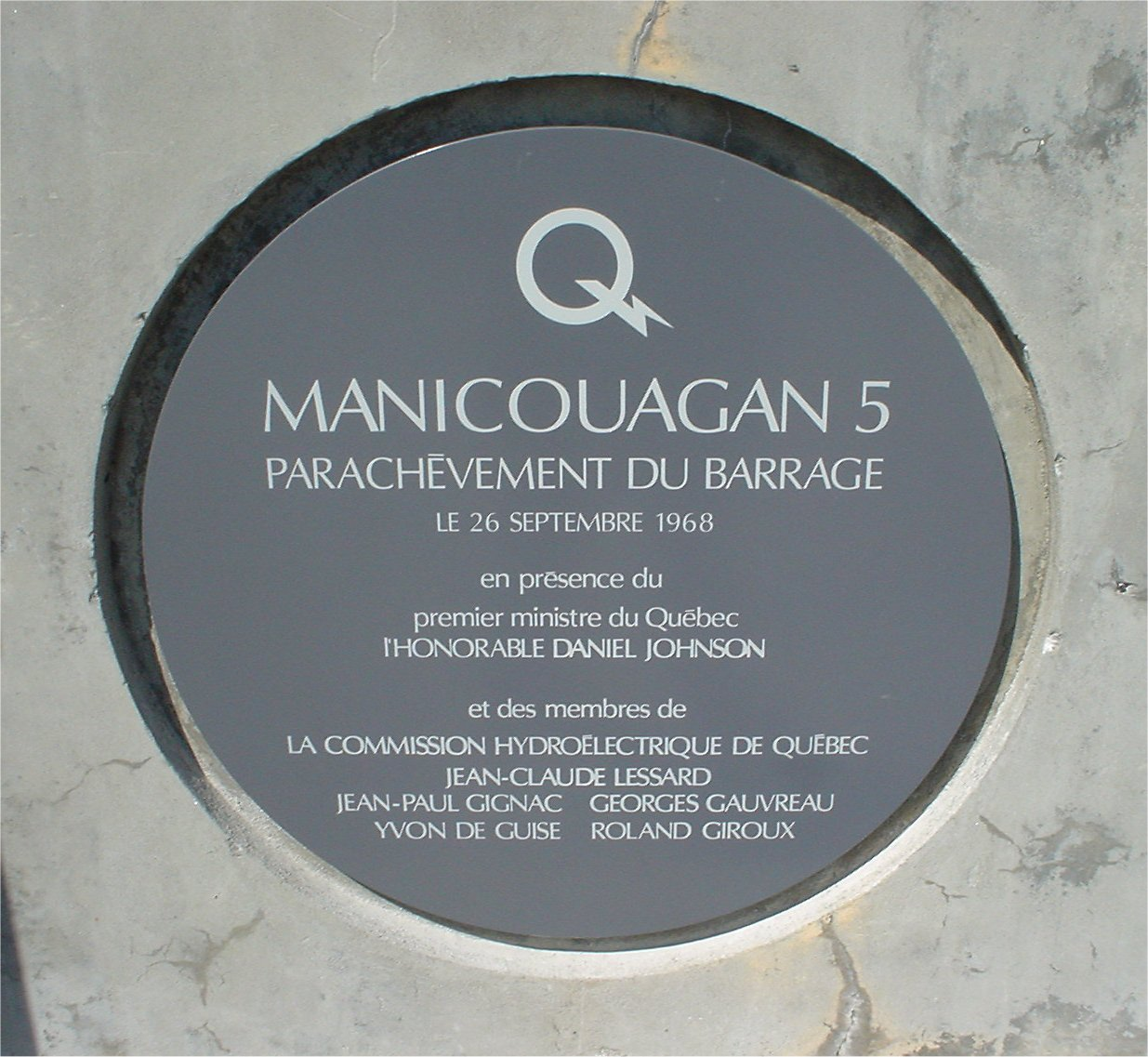
Original dedication plaque — Manicouagan 5, 1968

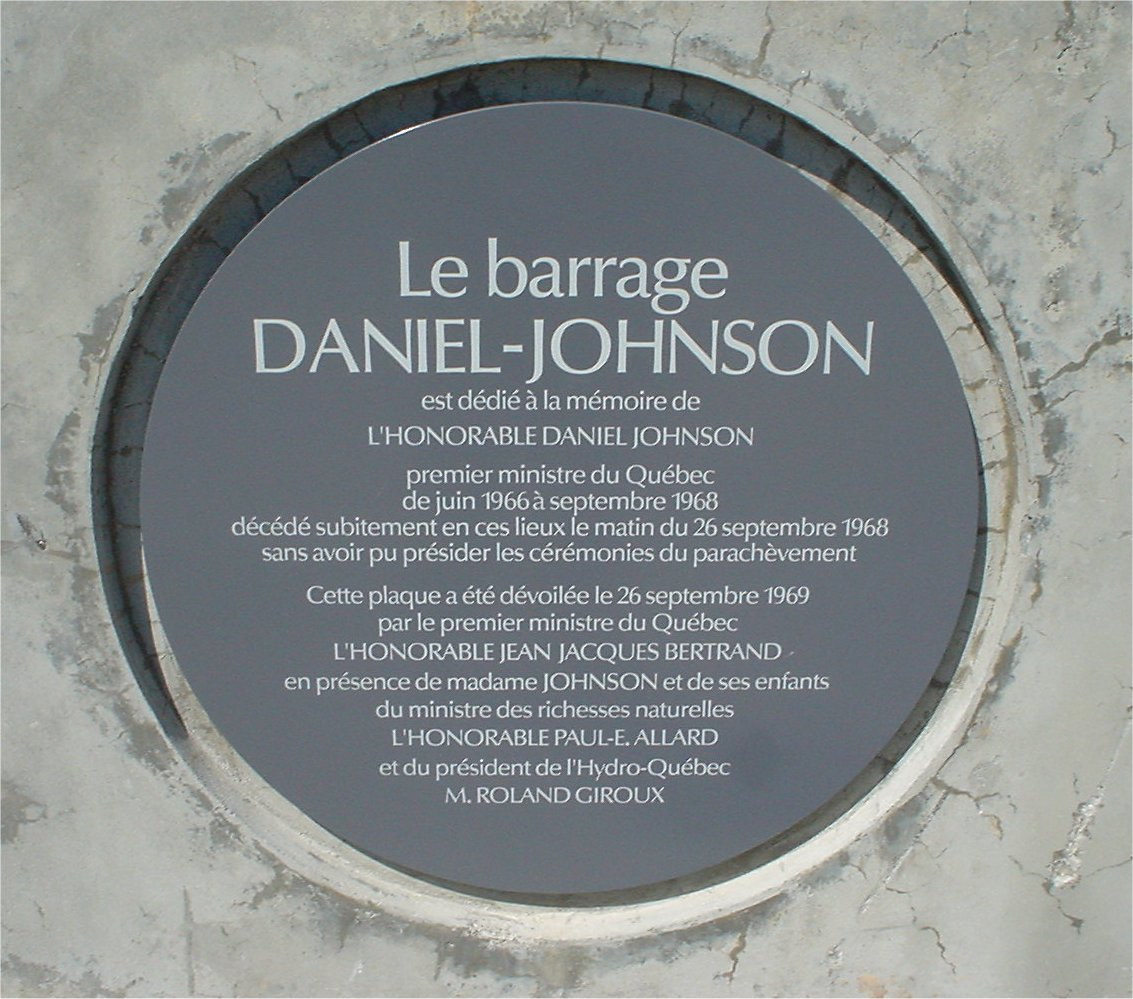
Dedication plaque of the Daniel Johnson Dam, unveiled by Johnson's successor, Jean-Jacques Bertrand on September 26, 1969

On September 25, 1968, the government-owned utility organized a ceremony to mark the completion of the Manicouagan-5 dam. Hundreds of dignitaries, politicians, utility executives, financiers, engineers and journalists were ferried by plane from Montreal, Quebec City and New York to the work-site to attend a banquet and a plaque unveiling ceremony.

Among the guests were Quebec Union Nationale premier Daniel Johnson Sr., his predecessor, Jean Lesage, and René Lévesque, the former Hydraulic Resources minister responsible for the consolidation of all investor-owned utilities into Hydro-Québec. Photographs taken at the banquet show the three men were in excellent spirits, holding hands and smiling, although relations between the Lesage and Lévesque, his former cabinet minister, were strained by Lévesque's recent defection to the separatist Mouvement Souveraineté-Association, a precursor of the Parti Québécois.

In his authorized biography, Hydro-Québec executive Robert A. Boyd recalls being woken up at 6 a.m. the next morning by his boss, Roland Giroux. "I've got bad news, Robert...", said Giroux, adding that he just found the premier lying dead in his bed. Johnson's sudden demise sent shock waves at the work-site and across the province and the dedication ceremony was quickly cancelled.

On September 26, 1969, a year to the day after Johnson's death, the new premier, Jean-Jacques Bertrand, accompanied by Johnson's widow and children, unveiled two plaques and officially dedicated the dam after his predecessor. Both plaques now sit side by side at the top of the complex.

== Facilities ==
=== Dam ===
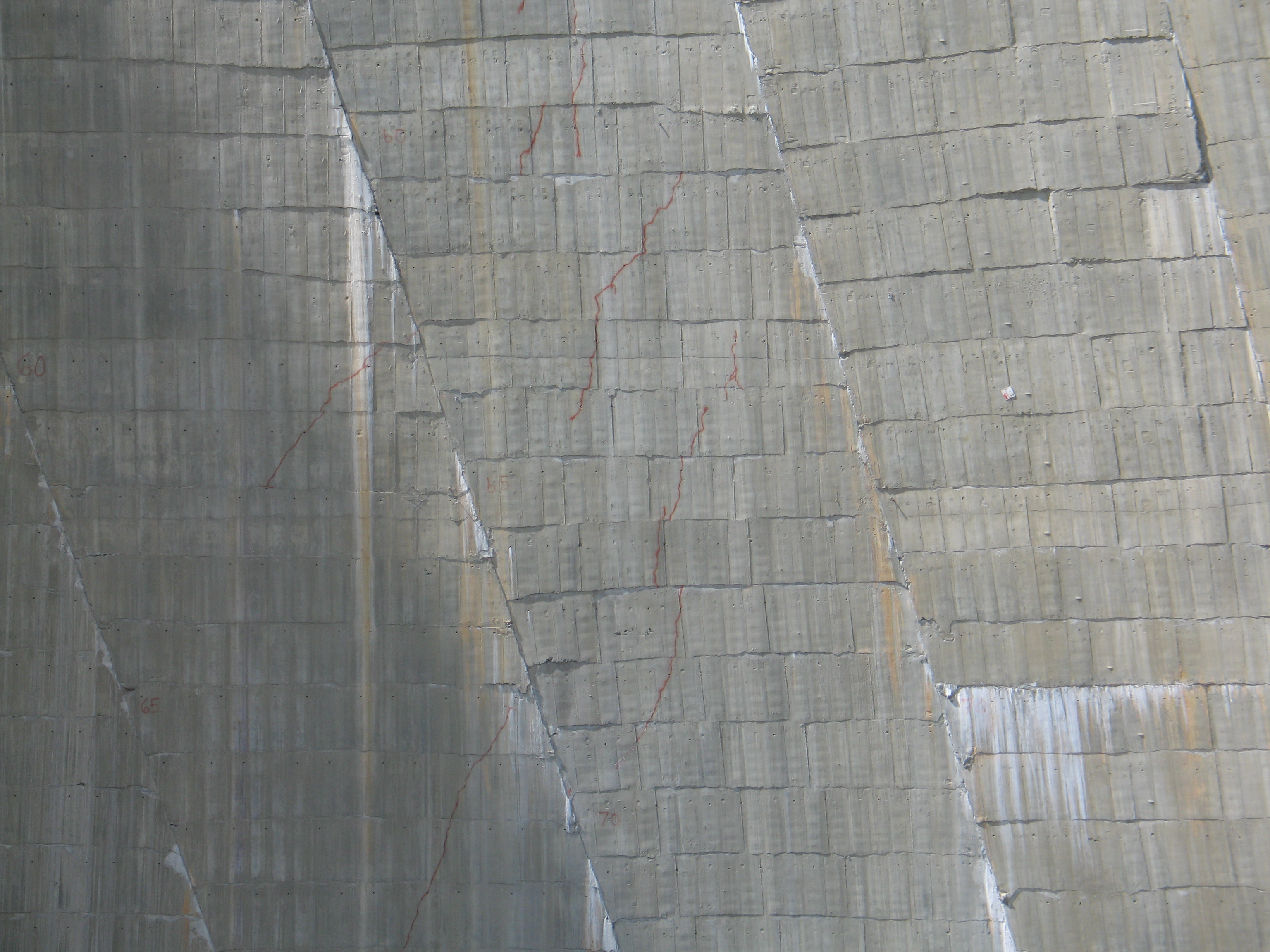
Detail of an arch of the dam. Red lines were drawn to indicate the presence of small cracks.

The design was chosen for strength and economical reasons as it used less concrete or material than a gravity or embankment dam. The Daniel-Johnson dam is a 214 m (702 ft) tall and 1,312 m (4,304 ft) long multiple-arch buttress dam. Of the dam's 14 total buttresses, the two that form the centre arch are 530 ft (160 m) apart at their base while the others are about 250 ft (76 m) apart. At its thickest point, the centre, the dam is 22.5 m (74 ft) wide while the crest can reach about 3 m (10 ft) wide. Pressure from water behind the dam is transferred from the dam's arches to its buttresses and lastly into the ground or its foundation.

The dam was constructed with a high-quality concrete designed to withstand constant thawing and freezing associated with its environment. To further help the structure cope with the climate, engineers placed one-inch steel reinforcing bars within the upstream and downstream faces of the dam. The concrete's strength in compression was initially 4,500 lbs. per square inch to meet an estimated 1,500 PSI within the structure. The upstream face of the dam was also coated in asphalt for protection against water. Despite the strength of the dam's concrete, two parallel inclined cracks were discovered on one of the arches shortly after construction.

=== Reservoir ===
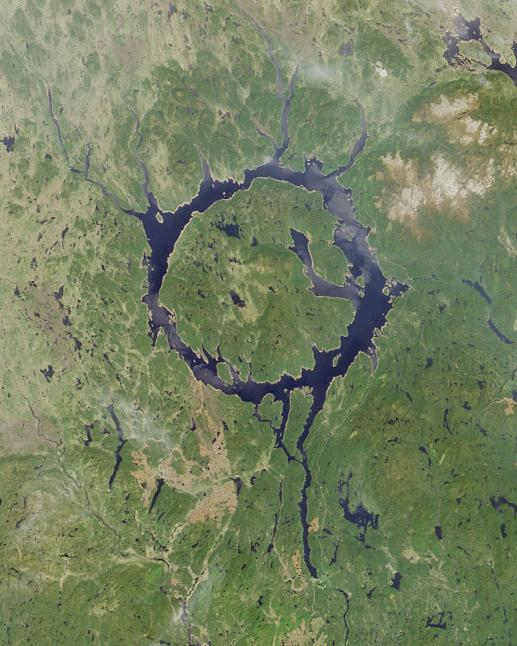
The Manicouagan Reservoir has been nicknamed the "Eye of Quebec". Daniel-Johnson Dam is located towards the bottom of image, beginning of reservoir.

The dam impounded the Manicouagan River, which filled the Earth's fifth largest confirmed impact structure, the Manicouagan impact structure, creating Manicouagan Reservoir. Coincidentally, the reservoir itself is the fifth largest in the world as well. The reservoir has a maximum depth of 350 m (1,150 ft), mean depth of 85 m (279 ft) and contains 142 km^{3} (34 mi^{3}) of water. While draining an area of 29,241 km (18,170 mi), it has a surface area of 1,950 km^{2} (750 mi^{2}) and shoreline of 1,322 km (821 mi).

The reservoir is a well known area for Atlantic salmon, lake trout and northern pike fishing, although tall trees flooded during the impoundment have not decomposed due to a lack of oxygen, which can sometimes interfere with the sport.

The priming of the reservoir also created a large artificial island in the centre of the Manicouagan reservoir by merging two crescent-shaped lakes: Mouchalagane Lake on the western side and Manicouagan Lake on the eastern side. Covering an area of 2,020 km^{2} (780 sq mi), René-Levasseur Island is considered to be the second largest island in the world located in a lake, in terms of area (the largest is Manitoulin Island, located within neighbouring Ontario's portion of Lake Huron).

The island was named after René Levasseur, the chief engineer responsible for the construction of the Daniel-Johnson dam. Levasseur died at the age of 35, only days before the dam's inauguration.

=== Powerhouses ===
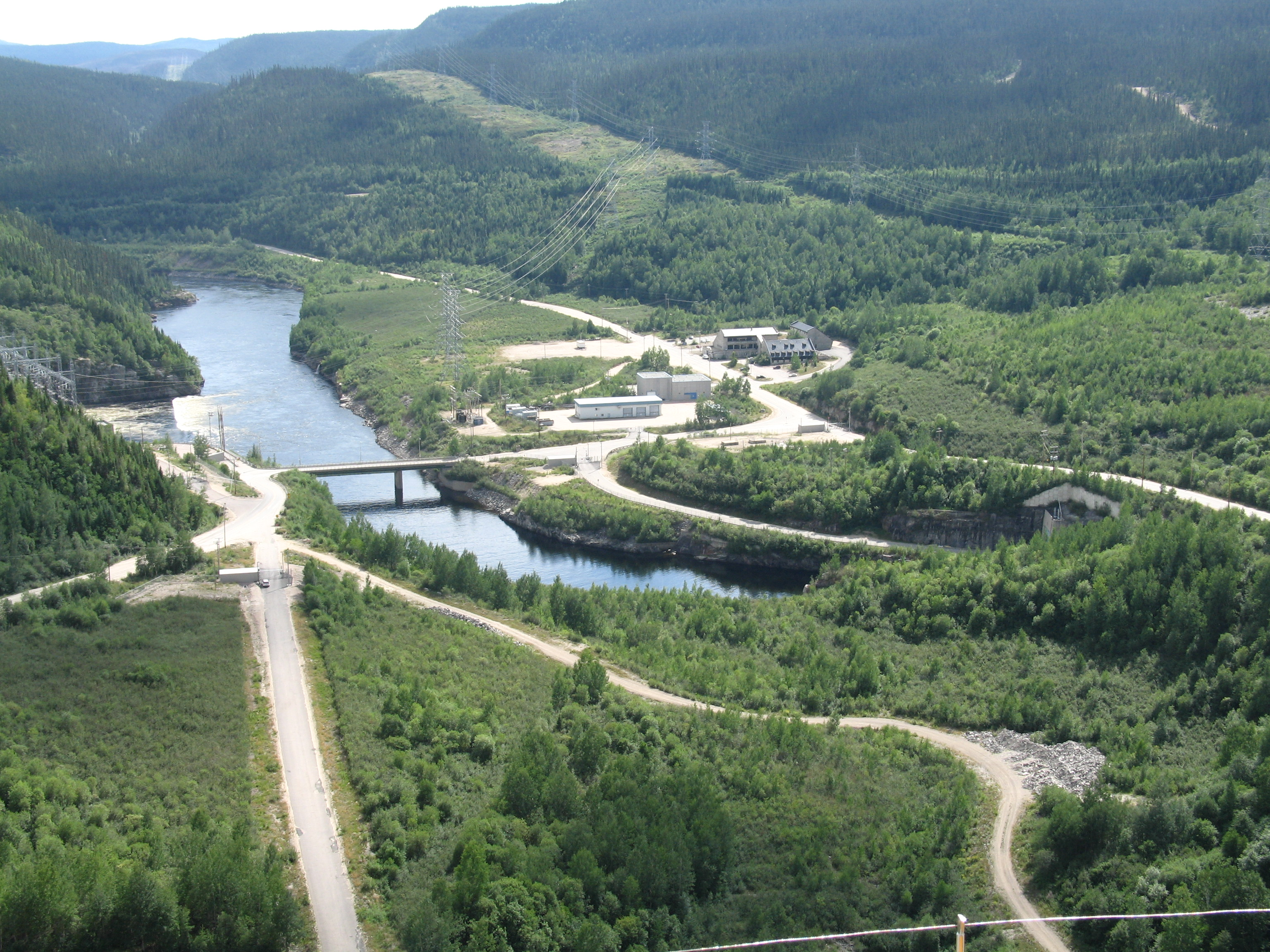
The Manic-5 powerhouse (left) and Manic-5-PA exit canal (right), as seen from the crest of the dam.

The dam fuels two powerhouses, the Manic-5 and Manic-5-PA. The first powerhouse consists of eight Francis turbines, capable of producing up to 1,596 MW of power, which went online in 1970. The second powerhouse, the Manic-5-PA (PA stands for puissance additionnelle or additional power), was commissioned in 1989, and consists of four Francis turbines of 1,064 MW in total installed capacity.

The designers of the Manic-5 decided on an above-ground powerhouse that was downstream of the dam for safety and cost. The intake was built on the east side of the dam and supplies two 3,400-foot-long (1,000 m), 36-foot-diameter (11 m) concrete-lined penstocks (tunnels). Just before reaching the power house and its eight turbines, each penstock splits into four branches. The power house is about 2,500 ft (760 m) downstream of the dam and uses two surge tanks for sudden rises in water pressure from the two penstocks. Each surge tank has an 80-foot-diameter (24 m) expansion chamber and is about 40 ft (12 m) higher than the actual dam structure. The surge tanks protect the penstocks and turbines from water hammer, which would occur if the turbine gates were quickly closed and water pressure suddenly increases.

== Cultural and political significance ==
The construction of the Daniel-Johnson Dam and the Manic-Outardes complex happened in a larger social and political context of the Quiet Revolution in Quebec, a time when recently nationalized "Hydro-Québec rapidly becomes a symbol of the new Quebec nationalism and of the new economic strategy of the State", explains historian Paul-André Linteau.

This newfound euphoric attitude is found in newspapers of the period. In a series of papers published in Montreal's La Presse, Renaude Lapointe calls Hydro-Québec a "colossus on the march". In this context, the construction of the complex is closely followed by the public and becomes part of the popular culture of that era.

For instance, chansonnier Georges Dor penned his 1966 hit song, La Manic, which tells the story of a construction worker at the remote jobsite who describes his loneliness to his wife in words that captured the collective imagination of the Quebec public.

Belgian-born novelist Henri Vernes was also inspired by the gigantic project and made the Manic-5 project the setting of one of his Bob Morane adventure novels. Terreur à la Manicouagan is about an attempt by arch-villain Roman Orgonetz to breach the dam by destroying the surge chamber by remote-controlled detonation, a plan foiled by Morane and his Scottish sidekick, Bill Ballantine. Prior to writing his novel, Vernes spent some time at the worksite, at the invitation of the Quebec government and Hydro-Québec. The book was launched in 1965 at the Hydro-Québec Building in Montreal.

Other notable visitors to the construction site included cartoonist Hergé, who left an original drawing of his characters Tintin the reporter and his dog Snowy posing in front of a ligne claire depiction of the dam. A colourized version of the autographed drawing is featured at the Jean-Lesage generating station visitor's centre, 23 kilometres (14 mi) north of Baie-Comeau.

The hydroelectric project also gave its name to Montreal's first foray into professional soccer, the short-lived Montreal Manic. The franchise competed for three seasons in the North American Soccer League in the early 1980s. In March 2000, the Canada Post Corporation issued a 46 cent stamp featuring the Dam as part of a 4-stamp Millennium Collection sheet depicting "engineering and technological marvels".

=== Guided tours ===
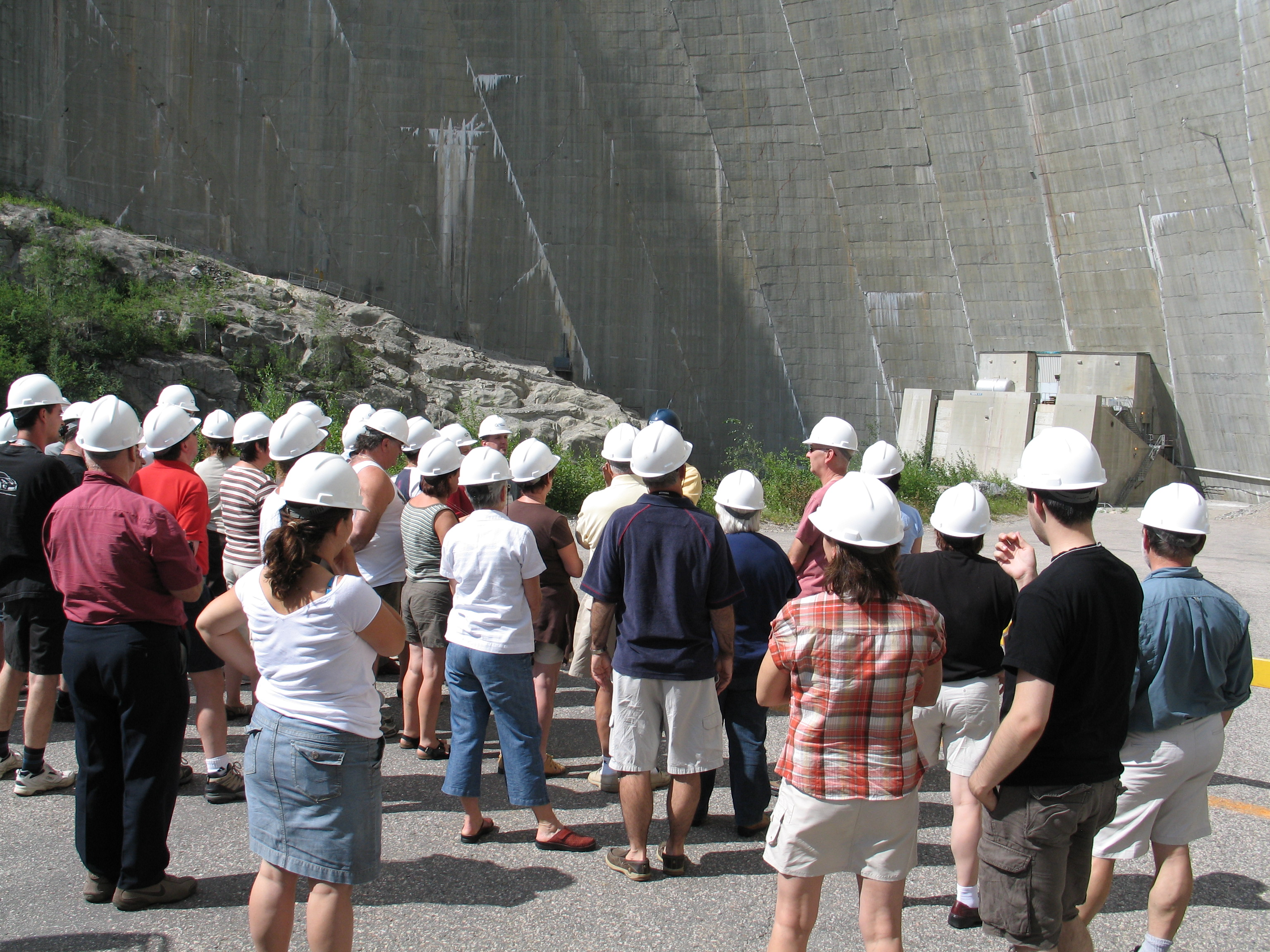
Hydro-Québec organizes free guided tours of the facility during the summer.

The dam is also a tourist attraction. Since the 1960s, Hydro-Québec organizes four daily tours of the facility between June 24, Quebec's National Day, and August 31. Off-season tours can also be arranged by appointment. The two-hour tour includes a briefing on the construction and operation of the facility, a visit of the Manic-5 powerhouse and a bus ride to the base and the crest of the dam, which has a view of the Manicouagan River valley. A lookout five minutes away by car is a popular picnic spot, with a view of the dam, which is lit at night.

Although picture-taking is allowed in the visitor centre and outside, cameras have been banned inside the powerhouses since a Radio-Canada television crew entered the unguarded Manic-5-PA and Robert-Bourassa powerhouses in February 2005. The incident led to the resignations of Hydro-Québec's CEO André Caillé, and chairman of the Board André Bourbeau, less than two months later.

The dam is about three hours' drive from Baie-Comeau along narrow, winding Route 389. Hydro-Québec reported 8,217 visitors in 2009.

== See also ==
- List of largest power stations in Canada
- List of conventional hydroelectric power stations
- Hydro-Québec's electricity transmission system
- Jean-Lesage generating station
- René-Lévesque generating station
