= Jean-Lesage generating station =

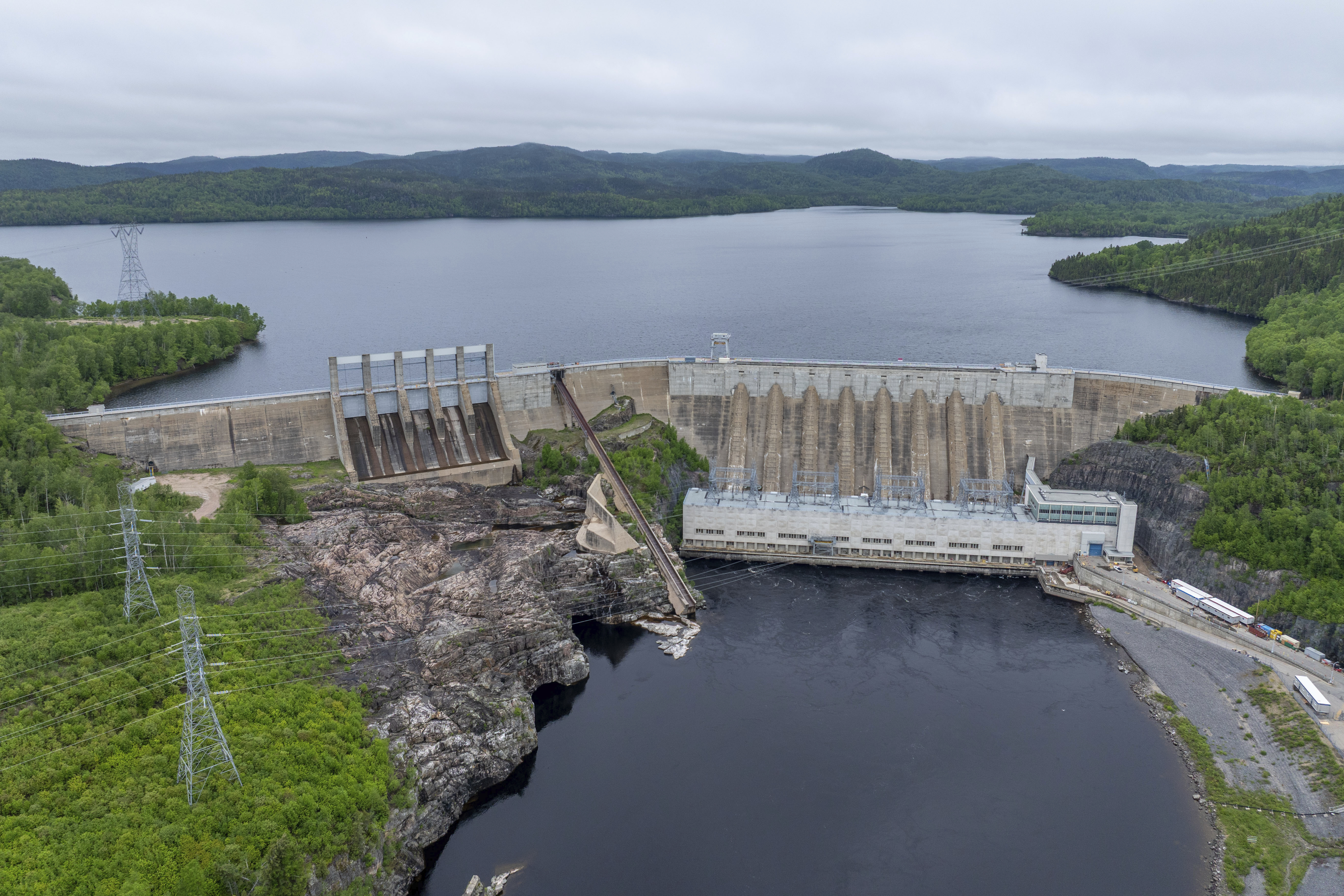
- Jean-Lesage generating station in 2026
- Interactive map of Jean-Lesage generating station
- Country: Canada
- Location: Manicouagan, Quebec
- Coordinates: 49°19′18″N 68°20′48″W
- Construction began: 1961
- Opening date: 1967
- Owner: HydroQuebec

Dam and spillways
- Impounds: Manicouagan River
- Height: 94 m (308 ft)
- Length: 692 m (2,270 ft)

Reservoir
- Creates: Manic-2
- Total capacity: 4,000,000 m^{3} (140,000,000 ft^{3})
- Surface area: 124 km^{2} (48 mi^{2})

Power Station
- Type: Run-of-the-river
- Turbines: 8 × Francis-type
- Installed capacity: 1,145 MW
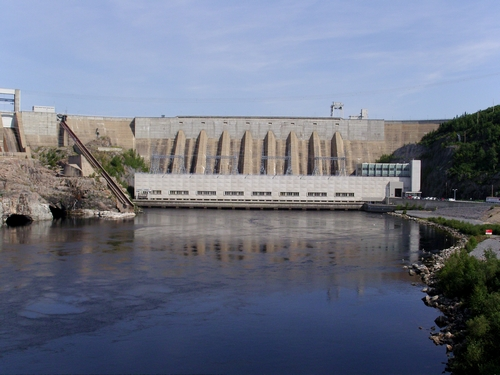

The Jean-Lesage generating station, (French: Centrale Jean-Lesage) formerly known as Manic-2, is a dam located 22 km from Baie-Comeau built on Manicouagan River in Quebec, Canada. It was constructed between 1961 and 1967. On June 22, 2010, the dam and the generating station were renamed in honour of Jean Lesage, who was premier of Quebec during the construction of the complex.

== Dam ==
Jean-Lesage is a gravity dam "hollow type" with a spillway made of concrete. The reservoir starts at the base of Manic-3. The dam is considered run-of-the-river and is fitted with eight Francis turbines, with a total capacity of 1,145 megawatts (1,535,000 hp).

== Construction and commissioning ==
Construction started on October 24, 1961. From June 2 to December 8, 1962, diversion tunnels were driven through the mountain to divert the river's flow around the construction site. The cofferdam that forced the water to use the diversion tunnels was completed on July 30, 1963, construction of the dam started the day after. By autumn 1965, the dam and powerhouse were sufficiently complete to put the first group of five turbines into service, the others were put in service at the end of construction. Commissioning was completed in 1967.

== Tourism ==
It is possible to visit the complex during summer between the end of June and start of September. The 90-minute visit consists of a guided tour by Hydro-Quebec which lets the visitor enter cavities of the dam and see a turbine in action within the powerhouse.

== See also ==
- List of largest power stations in Canada
- Manic-3
- Daniel-Johnson Dam
- Manicouagan Reservoir
