= René-Lévesque generating station =

Hydroelectric power station in Quebec

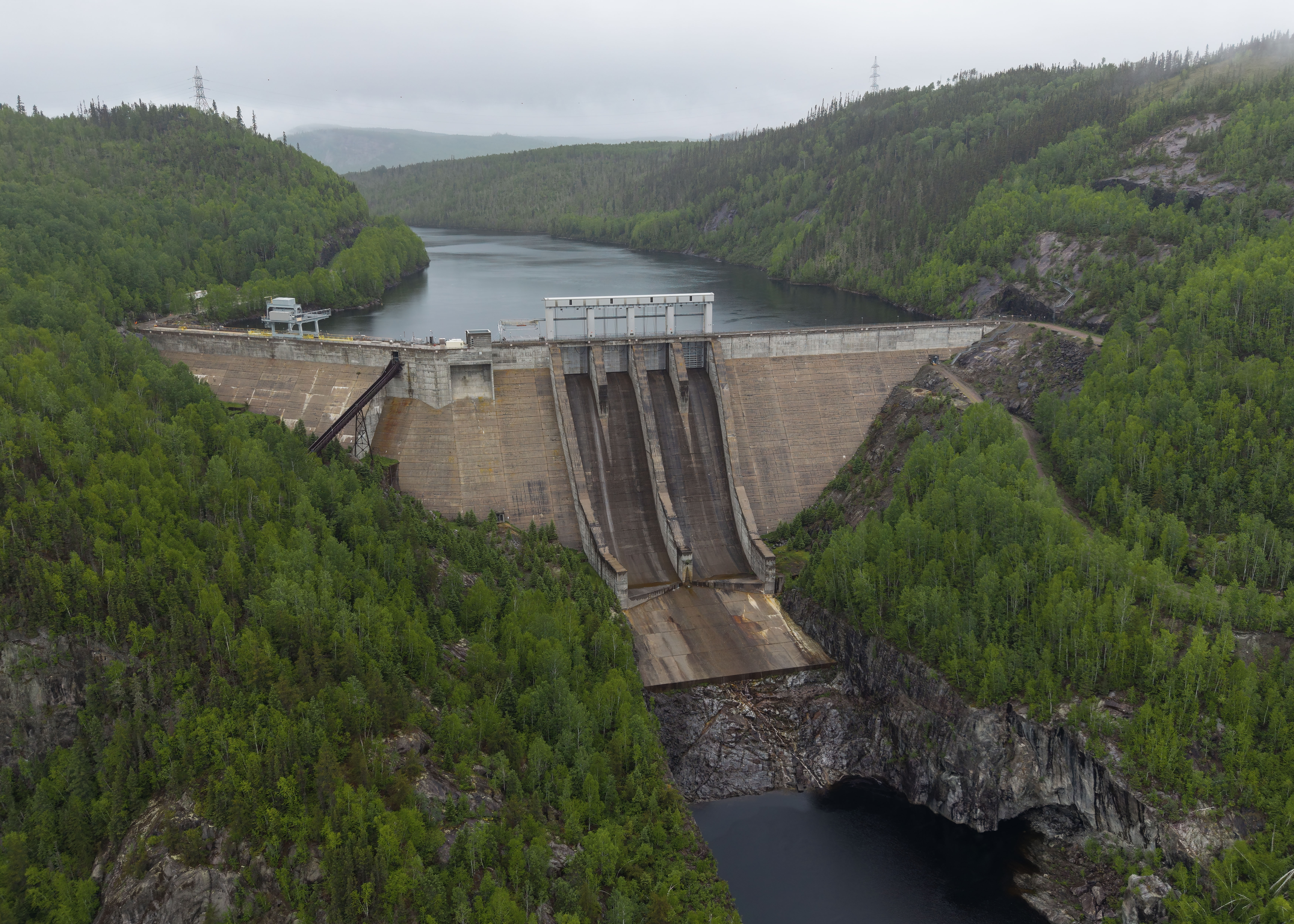
- Interactive map of René-Lévesque generating station
- Country: Canada
- Location: Manicouagan Regional County Municipality, Quebec, Canada
- Coordinates: 49°44′23″N 68°35′32″W
- Status: Operational
- Construction began: 1970
- Opening date: 1976
- Owner: Hydro-Québec

Dam and spillways
- Impounds: Manicouagan River
- Length: 773 m (2,536 ft)
- Width (base): 732 m (2,402 ft)

Reservoir
- Creates: Reservoir Manic-3
- Total capacity: 236 km² (91 sq. mi.)

Power Station
- Type: Run-of-the-river
- Hydraulic head: 94.19 metres (309 feet)
- Turbines: 6 × Francis turbine
- Installed capacity: 1,326 MW

The René-Lévesque generating station, formerly known as Manic-3, is a hydroelectric power station located 75 km (50 miles) from Baie-Comeau built on Manicouagan River, between 1970 and 1976. On June 22, 2010, the dam and the generating station were renamed to honour former Quebec premier René Lévesque, who was minister of Hydraulic resources during the construction of the complex and became premier of Quebec in 1976.

== Description ==
René-Lévesque is a two-dam complex. The east dam is a gravity "hollow type" made of concrete with a spillway; the dam is 71 metres (233 feet) high and 378 metres (1240 feet) long. The west dam is a sand and rockfill type with clay inside, long of 395 metres (1295 feet) and 107 metres (351 feet) with base width of 732 metres (2402 feet). The Manic-3 reservoir is 70 km (43 miles) long and 202 metres (663 feet) higher than sea level. The complex has six Francis turbines installed in an underground power station for a total capacity of 1,244 megawatts (later upgraded to 1326 MW).

== See also ==
- List of largest power stations in Canada
- Jean-Lesage generating station
- Daniel-Johnson Dam
- Manicouagan Reservoir
