= Vandal =

Vandal or Vandals most commonly refers to:

- Vandals, a Germanic tribe
- Vandal, a person who commits vandalism, intentionally damaging or destroying property

Vandal or Vandals may also refer to:

== Arts and entertainment ==
- The Vandals, a 1980s American punk rock band
- The Vandals (UK band), a 1970s British punk rock band
- Vandal Savage, a DC Comics supervillain
- The Vandals, an evil alien species in the TV show Hot Wheels Battle Force 5
- Vandal (website), a Spanish video game blog
- "Vandal", a poem from the 1978 book Babel by Patti Smith

== Military and transportation ==
- Vandal (tanker), a 1903 Russian river tanker
- HMS Vandal, a British Second World War submarine
- MQM-8G Vandal supersonic drone, made from the American RIM-8 Talos missile

== People ==
- Albert Vandal (1853–1910), French historian
- Dan Vandal (born 1960), Canadian politician
- Ecca Vandal, Australian rapper
- Erica Vandal, American military officer
- Liz Vandal (born 1965), Canadian fashion designer
- Marcel Vandal (1882–1965), French film producer
- Thierry Vandal, Canadian business executive
- Thomas S. Vandal (1960–2018), American military officer

== Other uses ==
- Idaho Vandals, the intercollegiate athletic teams of the University of Idaho
- Vandal Stakes, an annual Canadian Thoroughbred horse race from 1956 through 2016

== See also ==
- Wandal (disambiguation)
- Ecca Vandal (album), a 2017 album by Ecca Vandal
- Vandalism (band), Australian electro house group
