= Gunugus =

Ancient city

- Gunugu
- Location within Algeria
- 36°34′16″N 1°54′11″E
- Location: Algeria
- Region: Algiers Province

Gunugus or Gunugu (Punic: 𐤂𐤍𐤂𐤍, gngn) was a Berber and Carthaginian town in northwest Africa in antiquity. It passed into Roman control during the Punic Wars and was the site of a colony of veteran soldiers. It survived the Vandals and Byzantines but was destroyed during the Muslim invasion of the area.

== Location ==
Gunugus has been tentatively—but not certainly—identified with the ruins at Sidi Brahim de Gouraya on the Mediterranean coast near Gouraya, Algeria.

== History ==
Gunugus was a Berber and Carthaginian town from around 550 BC. It may have also been the site of a Greek colony at some point

After the Punic Wars, Gunugus was the site of a Roman colony established by Augustus.

It was administered as part of the province of Caesarian Mauretania. The local Berbers made up a large part of the settlement as well.

Gunugus existed through the Vandal Kingdom and the Byzantine reconquest of Africa. It was destroyed around AD 640.

== Bishopric ==
The town was also the seat of an ancient Roman Catholic bishopric. The only known bishop of this diocese is Ausilius, who took part in the synod assembled in Carthage in 484 by the Vandal King Huneric, after which Ausilius was exiled. Today Gunugo Diocese survives as a titular bishopric of the Roman Catholic Church and the current bishop is Sylvester David, of Cape Town.
