= Jean-Jacques Archambault =

Jean-Jacques Archambault (French pronunciation: [ʒɑ̃ ʒak aʁʃɑ̃bo]; March 21, 1919 – December 23, 2001) was a Quebec engineer. He worked at Hydro-Québec and is known for his work on the 735kV electric transmission technology in the early 1960s.

The 735-kV technology was put in service on 29 November 1965, and the technology was described as the technological innovation of the 20th century for Quebec by the Ordre des ingénieurs du Québec.

In 2005, Hydro-Québec received an Institute of Electrical and Electronics Engineers (IEEE) Milestone award for the technology.

An amphitheatre in the Hydro-Québec Building in Montreal is named after him, and the Eastern Canada Council of the Institute of Electrical and Electronics Engineers (IEEE) awards the Jean-Jacques Archambault Award of Merit in his honour.

== 735-kV transmission line ==
Shortly after being hired as a planner at Hydro-Québec, he showed interest in the possibility of 735 kV transmission. With the highest operational voltage elsewhere being 525 kV, many American specialists affirmed that a 735-kV line was impossible to develop, but the Commission hydroélectrique de Québec approved his idea and launched a project to install a transmission line from Montreal to the Manicouagan-Outardes complex.

== See also ==
- Hydro-Québec's electricity transmission system
