= Kara Corcoran =

American military officer and football player

Personal details
- Children: 2
- Education: Norwich University
- Awards: Parachutist Badge

Military service
- Branch/service: United States Army
- Years of service: 2008–2025
- Rank: Major
- Battles/wars: Operation Enduring Freedom
- Sports career
- Sport: Women's American football
- Team: Denver Bandits

Kara Corcoran is an American retired military officer and women's football player. She was forced to retire from the United States Army in 2025, following President Donald Trump's Executive Order 14183 banning transgender people from military service. Corcoran is the vice president of SPARTA Pride, a nonprofit organization focused on the rights of transgender troops. She played for the Denver Bandits in the Women's National Football Conference for three seasons.

== Early life, family, and education ==
Corcoran grew up in North Attleborough in a German-Irish Catholic military family. Her father was a 1972 graduate of the United States Military Academy, her mother was an Army brat, and her grandfather was a sergeant major. Corcoran's sister, Natalie, is also transgender and served as a lieutenant colonel in the army.

Corcoran graduated from Norwich University, where she was in the Reserve Officers' Training Corps, in 2008.

== Career ==
=== Military ===
Corcoran was commissioned into the United States Army in 2008 and served for eighteen years, including two deployments to Afghanistan. She also attended the Ranger School and Airborne School. Corcoran was a company commander and platoon leader and earned a Ranger tab. She served a 600-soldier tank battalion stationed at Fort Bliss in Texas as a battalion executive officer, and was an instructor at the Maneuver Captains Career Course.

Corcoran involuntarily separated from the Army in 2025, following President Donald Trump's Executive Order 14183 which banned transgender people from military service. She faced a separation board hearing at Fort Leavenworth in Leavenworth County, Kansas.

In 2025, she served as the vice president of SPARTA, a nonprofit organization focused on the rights of transgender service members and military recruits.

In July 2026, she was interviewed on ABC News about her life, military career, and views on Pete Hegseth's forced verification of testosterone levels for military personnel.

=== Women's football ===
She played with the Denver Bandits, a women's national football team, for three seasons. She started on the offensive line in the playoffs of the 2022 season. She was a run-stopper on defense and a hard-nosed fullback on offense in the 2024 season, leading the Bandits in tackles for loss and adding two touchdowns on offense for a playoff-qualifying team. Corcoran earned second-team All-Women's National Football Conference honors.

== Personal life ==
Prior to coming out as a trans woman and transitioning in 2018, Corcoran married and had two daughters. She and her wife later divorced.
