= Hydro-Québec =

Canadian hydroelectric utility

- Type: Crown corporation
- Industry: Electric utilities
- Founded: April 14, 1944
- Headquarters: Hydro-Québec Building, Montreal, Quebec, Canada
- Area served: Quebec
- Key people: Claudine Bouchard (President & CEO)
- Products: Electric power generation, electric power transmission, electricity distribution
- Revenue: ▲CA$17.999 billion (2025)
- Net income: ▲CA$2.906 billion (2025)
- Total assets: ▲CA$108.033 billion (2025)
- Total equity: ▲CA$30.033 billion (2025)
- Owner: Government of Quebec
- Number of employees: 23,915 (2025)
- Website: www.hydroquebec.com

Hydro-Québec (French pronunciation: [idʁo kebɛk]) is a Canadian Crown corporation public utility owned by the Provincial government of Quebec headquartered in Montreal, Quebec. It manages the generation, transmission and distribution of electricity in Quebec, as well as the export of power to portions of the Northeast United States. More than 40 percent of Canada's water resources are in Quebec, and Hydro-Québec is one of the largest hydropower producers in the world.

It was established as a Crown corporation by the government of Quebec in 1944 from the expropriation of private firms. This was followed by massive investment in hydro-electric projects like the James Bay Project. Today, with 63 hydroelectric power stations, the combined output capacity is 37,370 megawatts. Extra power is exported from the province and Hydro-Québec supplies 10 per cent of New England's power requirements. The company logo, a stylized "Q" fashioned out of a circle and a lightning bolt, was designed by Montreal-based design agency Gagnon/Valkus in 1960.

In 2023, it paid CA$2.47 billion in dividends to its sole shareholder, the Government of Quebec. Its residential power rates are among the lowest in North America.

== History ==
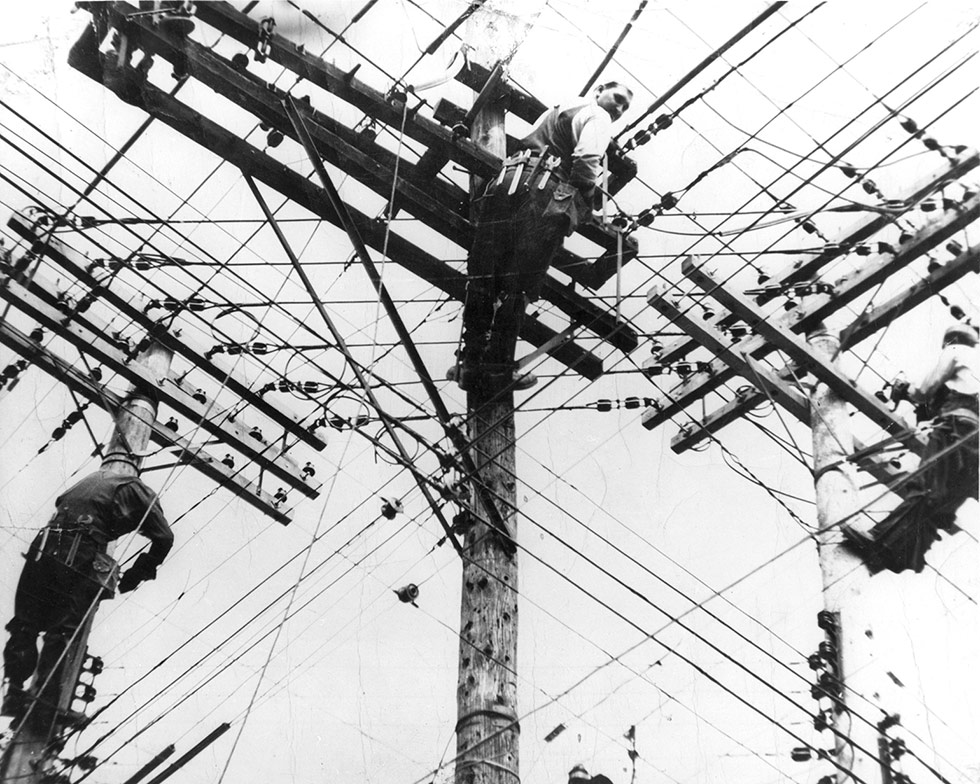
Montreal Light, Heat and Power linemen.

=== 1945–1959: beginnings and development ===
In Quebec, advocates for the creation of a public hydroelectric utility protested against high costs, poor rural electrification, and the lack of French speakers in management positions in hydroelectricity companies. In 1944, Montreal Light, Heat & Power company was nationalised, along with its subsidiary, Beauharnois Power, and Hydro-Québec was created to manage the companies.

Quebec Premier Adélard Godbout adopted a policy of investing 10 million dollars per year in rural electrification. However, in 1944 the government changed, and the new premier Maurice Duplessis was opposed to any form of government intervention in the economy. Local cooperatives were created to bring power to rural areas. Duplessis remained in power until 1960, and during that time there were no further nationalisations of companies, and Hydro-Québec mostly served the Montreal area.

Major projects included:

- Bersimis-1 generating station completed in 1956, 1,125 MW
- Bersimis-2 generating station completed in 1959, 845 MW
- Beauharnois Hydroelectric Generating Station completed in 1961, 1,903 MW.
- Carillon Generating Station built 1959–1964, 752 MW

Between 1944 and 1962, Hydro-Québec's installed capacity increased from 616 to 3,661 MW while lowering residential power rates by half in the Montreal area.

=== 1960–1979: the second nationalization ===
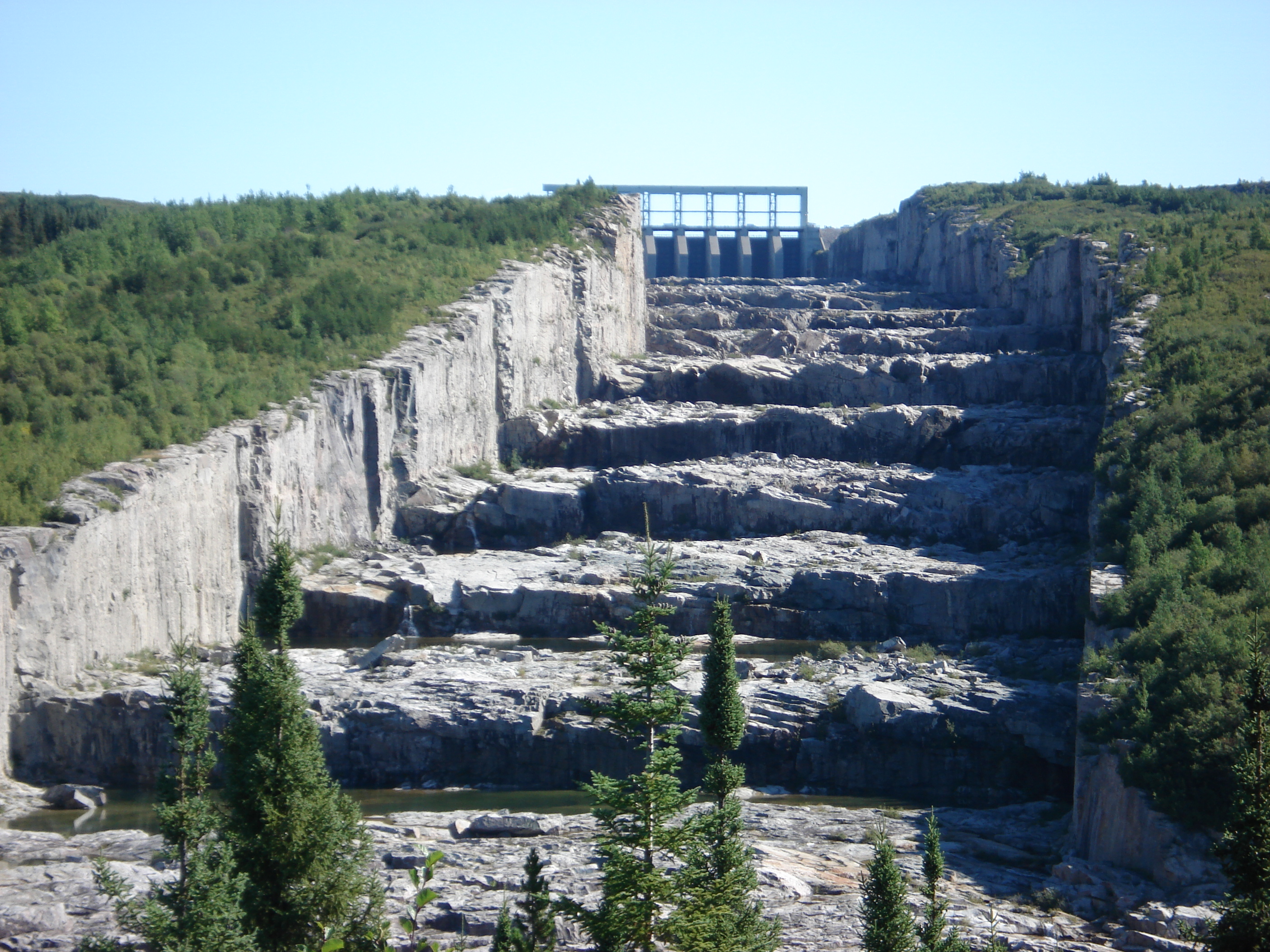
The spillway at the Robert-Bourassa generating station can deal with a water flow twice as large as the Saint Lawrence River. Inaugurated in 1979 the 5,616 MW generating station was at the heart of a network of 8 hydroelectric stations known as the James Bay Project.

Duplessis's conservative reign, now known as the Grande Noirceur, ended when he died in office in 1959. The subsequent election of the Quebec Liberal Party, led by Jean Lesage, marked the beginning of the Quiet Revolution, a period of reform and modernization. In 1962, the US government lent Quebec $300 million. The funds were used to acquire independent power companies. The new government gave Hydro-Québec an exclusive mandate to develop new sites. In 1963 the government authorized it to acquire private electricity distributors, including the Gatineau Power Company and the Shawinigan Water & Power Company Hydro-Québec achieved province-wide scope. All of the 46 rural coops accepted Hydro-Québec's 1963 buyout offer, except Saint-Jean-Baptiste-de-Rouville which still exists. In 1964, the Province of British Columbia provided the Province of Quebec with a $100 million loan. $60 million from that loan went to Hydro-Québec. The loan faced controversy in the Quebec legislature. Major projects during this period included:

- Manicougan-Outardes Project, a 7-dam hydroelectric complex including the Jean-Lesage generating station (1,145 MW), René-Lévesque generating station (1,244 MW), and the Daniel-Johnson Dam (2,596 MW), originally named Manic-2, Manic-3, and Manic-5 respectively. Because these stations were 700 kilometres (400 miles) away from the urban centres in southern Quebec, through transmission line voltage was stepped up to 735 kV for the first time anywhere, led by engineer Jean-Jacques Archambault.
- Churchill Falls Generating Station, 5,428 MW. The station is in Labrador and the government of Quebec negotiated a contract where Hydro-Québec buys power from the project at 1969 prices until the year 2041. That contract had been a source of conflict between the two provinces. In December 2024, Newfoundland premier Andrew Furey and Quebec premier François Legault signed a 50-year Memorandum of understanding that would not terminate the original contract but see Hydro-Quebec paying the Churchill Falls operating company a fixed amount above the original price contracted in 1969 while remaining well below fair market value for the electricity. If ratified by both provinces, Hydro-Quebec would pay an average of 2.7 cents per kilowatt hour for electricity from CF until 2075.
- Phase I of the James Bay Project.
- Hydro-Québec worked with Atomic Energy of Canada Limited to build the CANDU reactor equipped Gentilly Nuclear Generating Station, which closed in 2012.

=== 1980–1996: restructuring ===
Because of the economic climate, demand for electricity dropped significantly in the early 1980s, which led to structural changes at Hydro-Québec. It became a joint stock company whose sole shareholder is Government of Québec, to which it pays an annual dividend. It was also given the mandate to export power and to work in any energy-related field.

In 1986 the Quebec – New England Transmission began bringing power from the James Bay Project 1,100 kilometers (700 miles) south to the Boston area.

Phase II of the James Bay Project started in 1987 and took nine years to complete. Construction of the Denis-Perron Dam began in 1994.

=== 1997–present: renewed growth ===
Like its counterparts in the North American utility industry, Hydro-Québec was reorganized in the late 1990s to comply with electricity deregulation in the United States. The transmission division, TransÉnergie, was the first to be spun off in 1997, in response to the U.S. Federal Energy Regulatory Commission's publication of Order 888. In the same year, the U.S. Federal Energy Regulatory Commission granted Hydro-Québec a licence to sell wholesale electricity at market prices, enabling Hydro-Québec to expand its market. Hydro-Québec also acquired a substantial share of Noverco, controller of natural gas distributor Énergir, to participate in that market in northeastern North America.

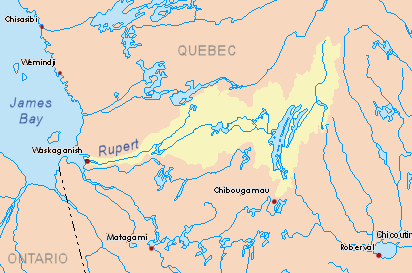
the Rupert River diversion will channel part of the natural flow of the river (yellow on the map) to the Robert-Bourassa Reservoir.

In 2002 the Agreement Respecting a New Relationship Between the Cree Nation and the Government of Quebec between the Grand Council of the Crees and the Quebec government made possible the development of the Eastmain Reservoir. The Eastmain-1-A and Sarcelle powerhouses and Rupert River diversion project were completed for $5,000 million CAD. This will provide water power to the turbines at Eastmain-1, Eastmain-1-A and Sarcelle powerhouses and will provide increased flow at the existing La Grande-1 generating station as well as Robert-Bourassa and the La Grande-2-A generator stations. Output will be 918 MW.

Other stations commissioned since 1997 are:

- Sainte-Marguerite-3 in 2003, 882 MW.
- Péribonka in 2008, 385 MW.
- Rocher-de-Grand-Mère in 2004, 230 MW.
- Eastmain-1in 2007, 480 MW
- Rapide-des-Cœurs in 2009, 76 MW.
- Chute-Allard in 2009, 62 MW
- Mercier in 2009, 55 MW.
- Bernard-Landry in 2012, 768 MW
- La Sarcelle in 2013, 150 MW.
- Romaine-2 in 2014, 640 MW.
- Romaine-1 in 2015, 270 MW.
- Romaine-3 in 2017, 395 MW.
- Romaine-4 in 2022, 245 MW.

=== Major outages ===
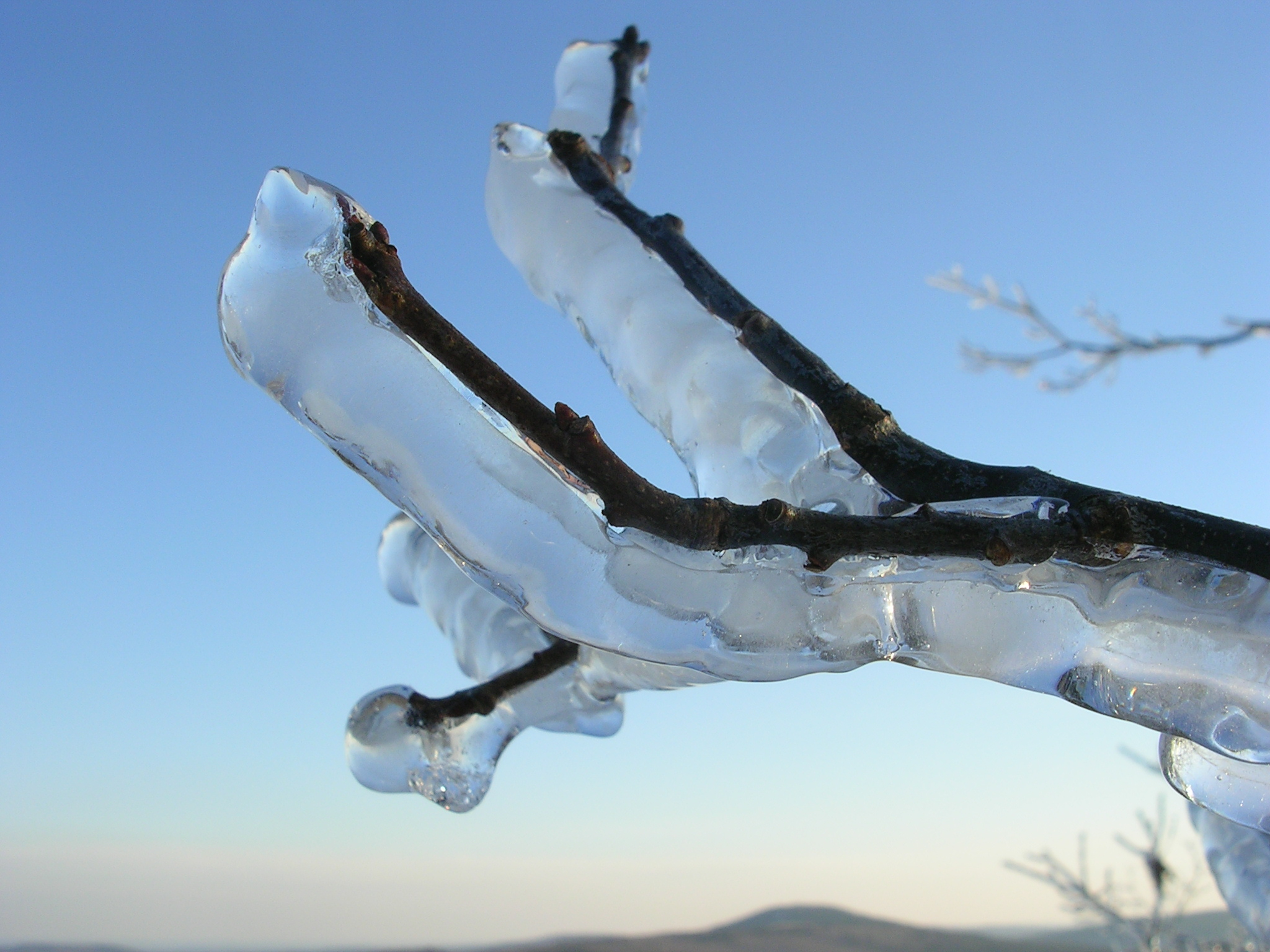
The North American ice storm of January 1998 left 1.4 million Hydro-Québec customers in the dark for up to five weeks.

In 1988, all of Quebec and parts of New England and New Brunswick lost power because of an equipment failure at a substation on the North Shore. The March 1989 geomagnetic storm tripped circuit breakers on the transmission network causing a nine-hour Quebec-wide blackout.

In the North American ice storm of 1998, five days of freezing rain collapsed 600 kilometres (370 mi) of high voltage power lines and over 3,000 kilometres (1,900 mi) of medium and low voltage distribution lines in southern Quebec. Up to 1.4 million customers were without power for up to five weeks.

== Corporate structure and financial results ==
=== Corporate structure ===
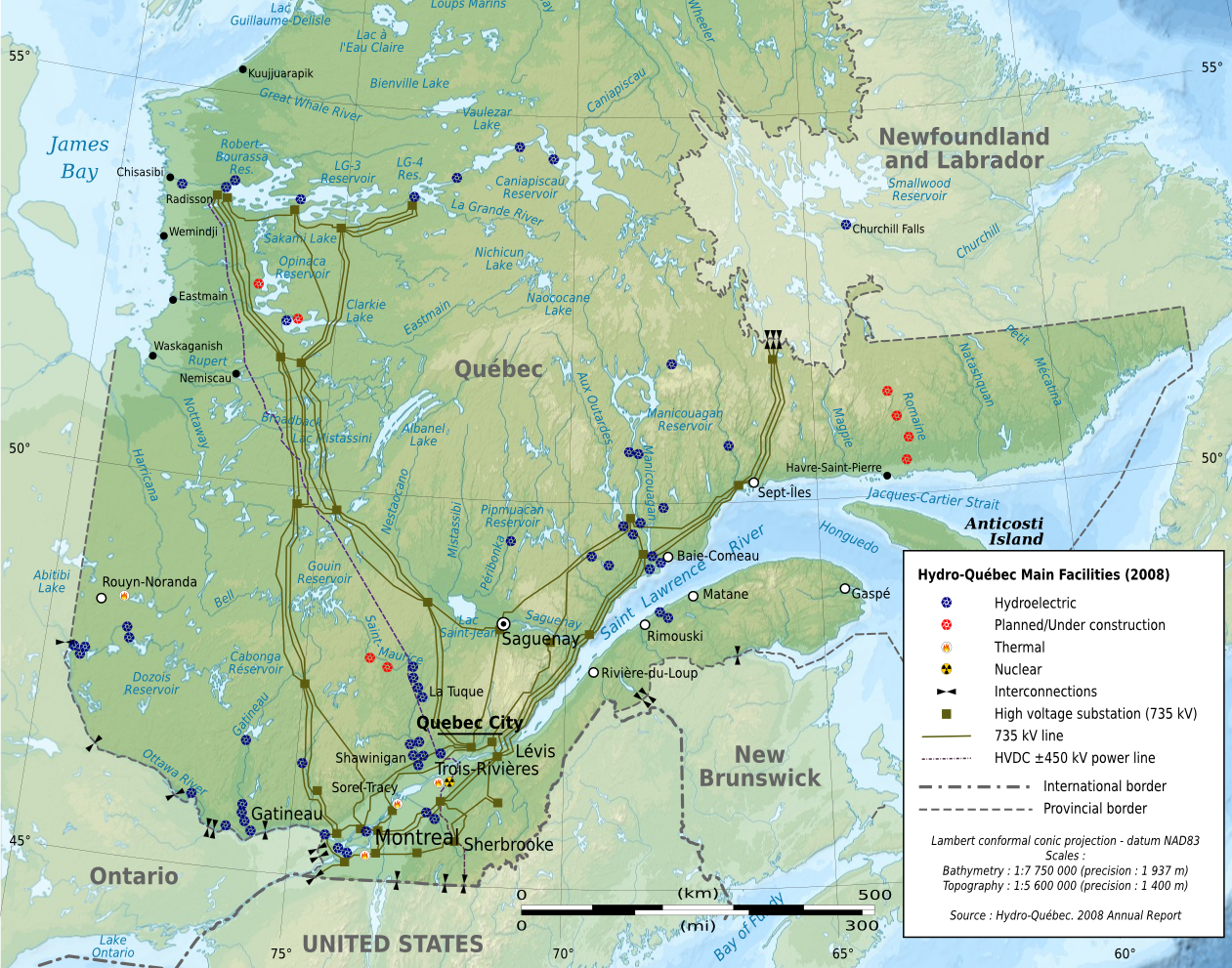
Hydro-Québec generation and main transmission network, as of 2008.

Hydro-Québec has created separate business units dealing with the generation, transmission, distribution and construction. In 2017, production division generated 1.9B $ of net income (68.4%), transmission division 0.55B$ (19.4%), distribution division 0.33B $ (11.7%), and construction division did not generate any income. Hydro-Quebec redistributes all profits back to the government. In 2017, the crown corporation contributed $4 billion to the Quebec government by means of net income ($2.8B), royalties ($0.7B), public utilities tax ($0.3B) and debt securities ($0.2B).

In the year 2000 with the adoption of Bill 116, which amended the Act respecting the Régie de l'énergie, to enact the functional separation of Hydro-Québec's various business units. Legislation passed in 2000 commits the generation division, Hydro-Québec Production, to provide the distribution division, Hydro-Québec Distribution, a yearly heritage pool of up to 165 TWh of energy plus ancillary services—including an extra 13.9 TWh for losses and a guaranteed peak capacity of 34,342 MW—at a set price of 2.79¢ per kWh. Order in council 1277-2001 specifies quantities to be delivered for each of the 8,760 hourly intervals, which vary from 11,420 to 34,342 MW.

According to the 2017 annual report the workforce stood at 19,786 employees, both permanent and temporary workers. And, a total of 1,304 employees were hired.

=== Privatization debate ===
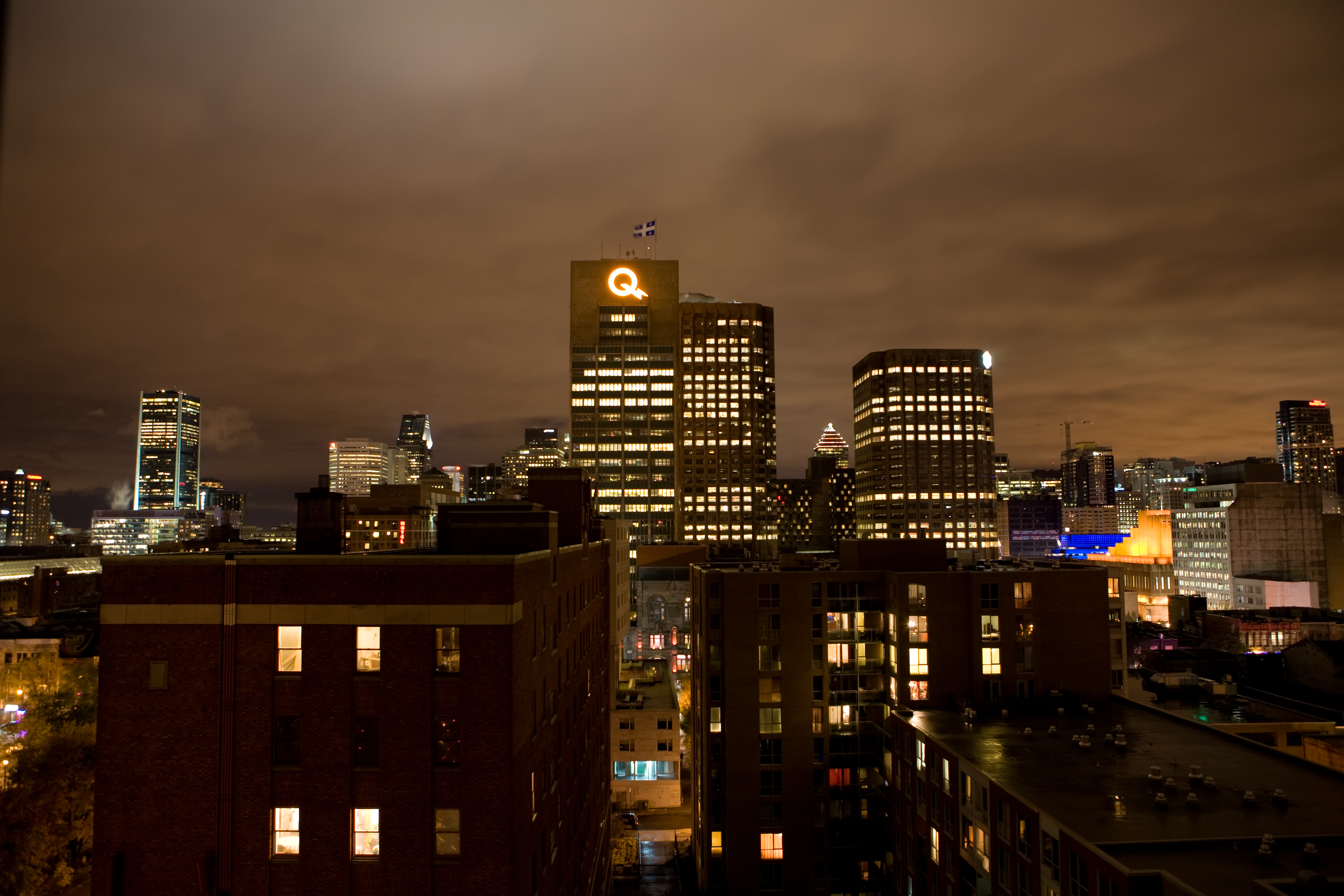
The Hydro-Québec Building is a landmark of Montreal's downtown.

In 1981, the Parti Québécois government redefined Hydro-Québec's mission by modifying the terms of the social pact of 1944. The government issued itself 43,741,090 shares worth C$100 each, and the amended statute stated that Hydro-Québec would now pay up to 75% of its net earnings in dividends. This amendment to the Hydro-Québec Act started an episodic debate on whether Hydro-Québec should be fully or partially privatized. In recent years, economist Marcel Boyer and businessman Claude Garcia—both associated with the conservative think tank The Montreal Economic Institute—have often raised the issue, claiming that the company could be better managed by the private sector and that the proceeds from a sale would lower public debt.

Without going as far as Boyer and Garcia, Mario Dumont, the head of the Action démocratique du Québec, briefly discussed the possibility of selling a minority stake of Hydro-Québec during the 2008 election campaign. A Léger Marketing poll conducted in November 2008 found that a majority of Quebec respondents (53%) were opposed to his proposal to sell 7.5% of the company's equity to Quebec citizens and businesses, while 38% were in favour.

Commenting on the issue on Guy A. Lepage's talk show, former PQ Premier Jacques Parizeau estimated that such an idea would be quite unpopular in public opinion, adding that Hydro-Québec is often seen by Quebecers as a national success story and a source of pride. This could explain why various privatization proposals in the past have received little public attention. The liberal government has repeatedly stated that Hydro-Québec is not for sale.

Like many other economists, Yvan Allaire, from Montreal's Hautes études commerciales business school, advocate increased electricity rates as a way to increase the government's annual dividend without resorting to privatization. Others, like columnist Bertrand Tremblay of Saguenay's Le Quotidien, claim that privatization would signal a drift to the days when Quebec's natural resources were sold in bulk to foreigners at ridiculously low prices. "For too long, Tremblay writes, Quebec was somewhat of a banana republic, almost giving away its forestry and water resources. In turn, those foreign interests were exporting our jobs associated with the development of our natural resources with the complicity of local vultures".

Left-wing academics, such as UQAM's Léo-Paul Lauzon and Gabriel Sainte-Marie, have claimed that privatization would be done at the expense of residential customers, who would pay much higher rates. They say that privatization would also be a betrayal of the social pact between the people and its government, and that the province would be short-selling itself by divesting of a choice asset for a minimal short term gain.

== Activities ==
=== Power generation ===
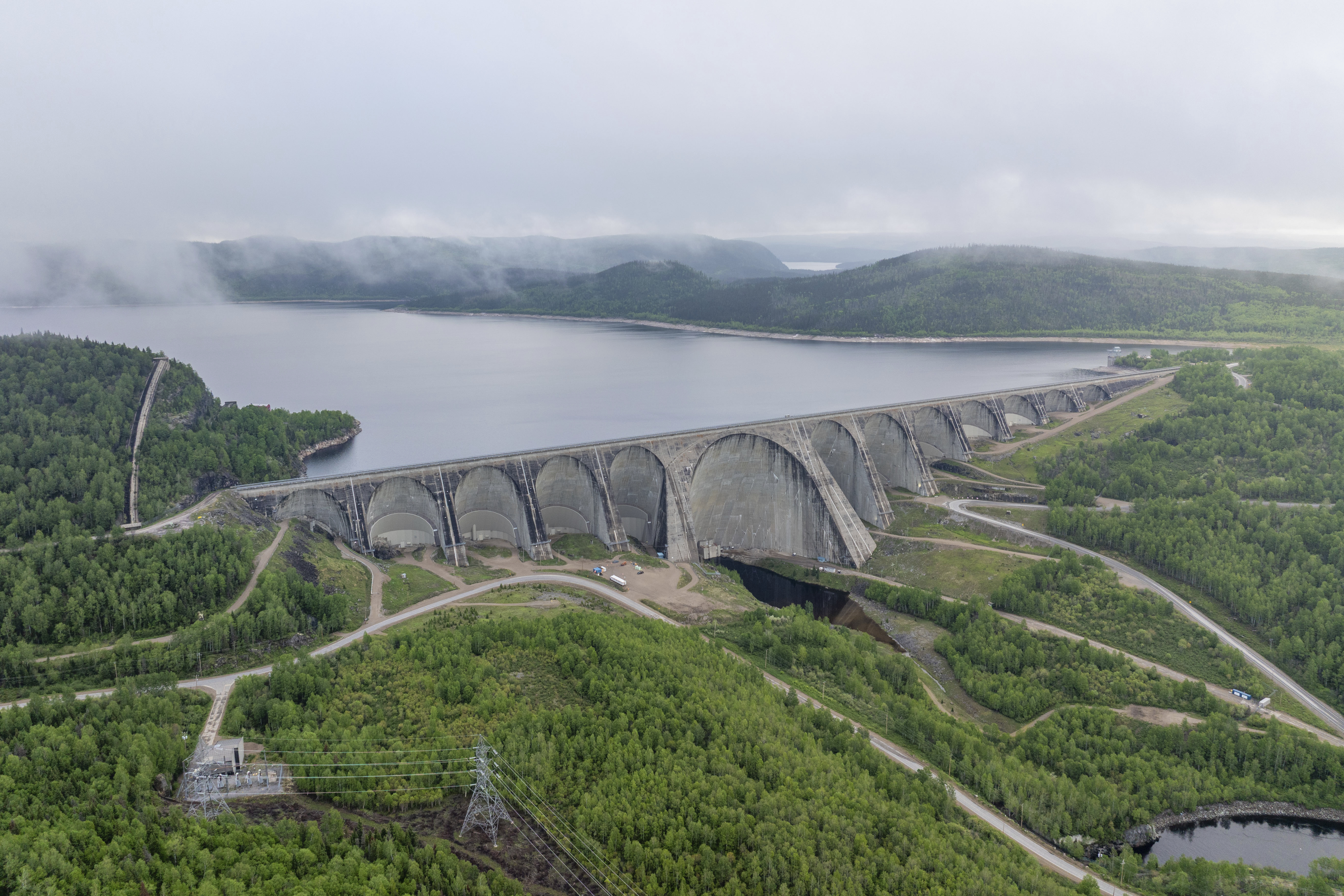
The Daniel-Johnson Dam on the Manicouagan River, supplying the Manic-5 hydro plant.

Hydro-Québec sources of energy supply (2013)
1. Hydro (96.8%)
2. Other Renewables (2.90%)
3. Nuclear (0.20%)
4. Thermal (0.10%)

On December 31, 2013, Hydro-Québec Production owned and operated 61 hydro plants —including 12 of over 1,000 MW capacity — with 26 major reservoirs. These facilities are located in 13 of Quebec's 430 watersheds, including the Saint Lawrence, Betsiamites, La Grande, Manicouagan, Ottawa, Outardes, and Saint-Maurice rivers. These plants provide the bulk of electricity generated and sold by the company.

Non-hydro plants included the baseload 675-MW gross Gentilly nuclear generating station, a CANDU-design reactor which was permanently shut down on December 28, 2012, the 660-MW Tracy Thermal Generating Station, a heavy fuel oil-fired plant shutdown in March 2011, and two gas turbine peaker plants, for a total installed capacity of 36,971 MW in 2011. Hydro-Québec's average generation cost was 2.11 cents per kWh in 2011.

The company also purchases the bulk of the output of the 5,428-MW Churchill Falls generating station in Labrador, under a long-term contract that would be extended under a new agreement to 2075, if the agreement is ratified. In 2009, Hydro-Québec bought the 60% stake owned by AbitibiBowater in the McCormick plant (335 MW), located at the mouth of the Manicouagan River near Baie-Comeau, for C$616 million.

Hydro-Québec Production main power plants (2023)
Plant	River	Capacity (MW)
Robert-Bourassa	La Grande	5,616
La Grande-4	La Grande	2,779
La Grande-3	La Grande	2,417
La Grande-2-A	La Grande	2,106
Beauharnois	Saint Lawrence	1,864
Manic-5	Manicouagan	1,596
La Grande-1	La Grande	1,436
René-Lévesque	Manicouagan	1,326
Jean-Lesage	Manicouagan	1,229
Bersimis-1	Betsiamites	1,178
Manic-5-PA	Manicouagan	1,064
Outardes-3	aux Outardes	1,026
Others (49 hydro, 1 thermal)		13,302
Total Hydroelectric power capacity		36,885

In 2023, the energy sold by Hydro-Québec to its grid-connected customers in Quebec and exported to neighboring markets came almost exclusively from renewable sources. Hydro (98.53%) is by far the largest source, followed by wind (0.11%) and biomass, biogas and waste (0.01%). In 2013, emissions of carbon dioxide (1,130 tonnes/TWh), sulfur dioxide (4 tonnes/TWh) and nitrogen oxides (10 tonnes/TWh) were between 49 and 238 times lower than the industry average in northeastern North America. Imported electricity bought on the markets account for most of these emissions.

=== Transmission system ===
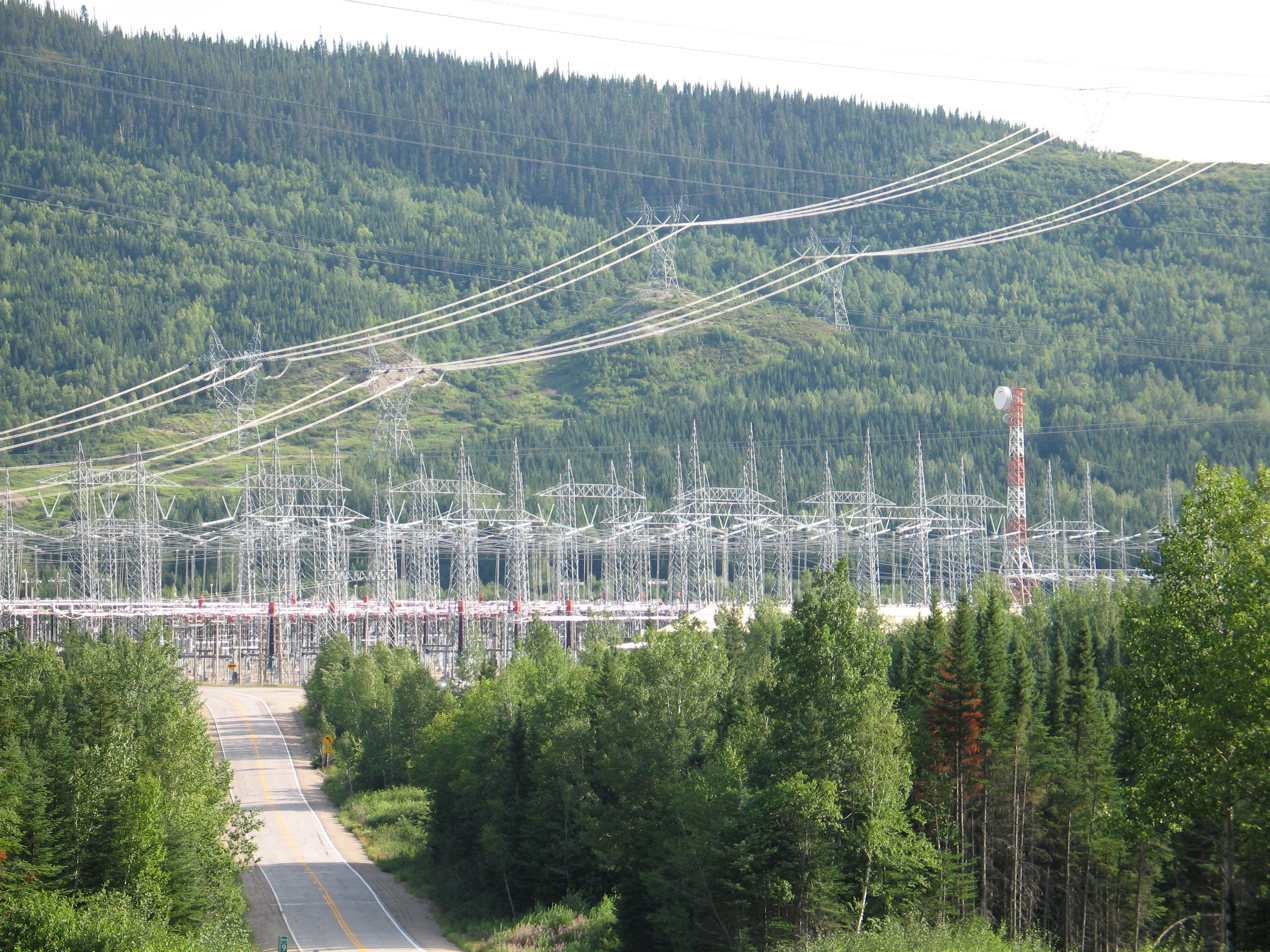
The Micoua substation on the North Shore of Quebec. This facility converts 315 kV power coming from five hydro plant to 735 kV. This TransÉnergie facility is one of the main nodes of the 11,422-kilometre (7,097 mi) long 735 kV network.

Hydro-Québec's expertise at building and operating a very high voltage electrical grid spreading over long distances has long been recognized in the electrical industry. TransÉnergie, Hydro-Québec's transmission division, operates the largest electricity transmission network in North America. It acts as the independent system operator and reliability coordinator for the Québec interconnection of the North American Electric Reliability Corporation system, and is part of the Northeast Power Coordinating Council (NPCC). TransÉnergie manages the flow of energy on the Quebec network and ensures non-discriminatory access to all participants involved in the wholesale market. The non-discriminatory access policy allows a company such as Nalcor to sell some of its share of power from Churchill Falls and from other sources on the open market in the State of New York using TransÉnergie's network, upon payment of a transmission fee.

In recent years, TransÉnergie's Contrôle des mouvements d'énergie (CMÉ) unit has been acting as the reliability coordinator of the bulk electricity network for Quebec as a whole, under a bilateral agreement between the Régie de l'énergie du Québec and the Federal Energy Regulatory Commission of the United States.

TransÉnergie's high voltage network stretches over 33,630 km (20,900 mi), including 11,422 km (7,097 mi) of 765 and 735 kV lines, and a network of 514 substations. It is connected to neighbouring Canadian provinces and the United States by 17 ties, with a maximum reception capacity of 10,850 MW (Note: This number includes the 5,200-MW Churchill Falls lines.) and a maximum transmission capacity of 7,994 MW.

==== Interconnections ====
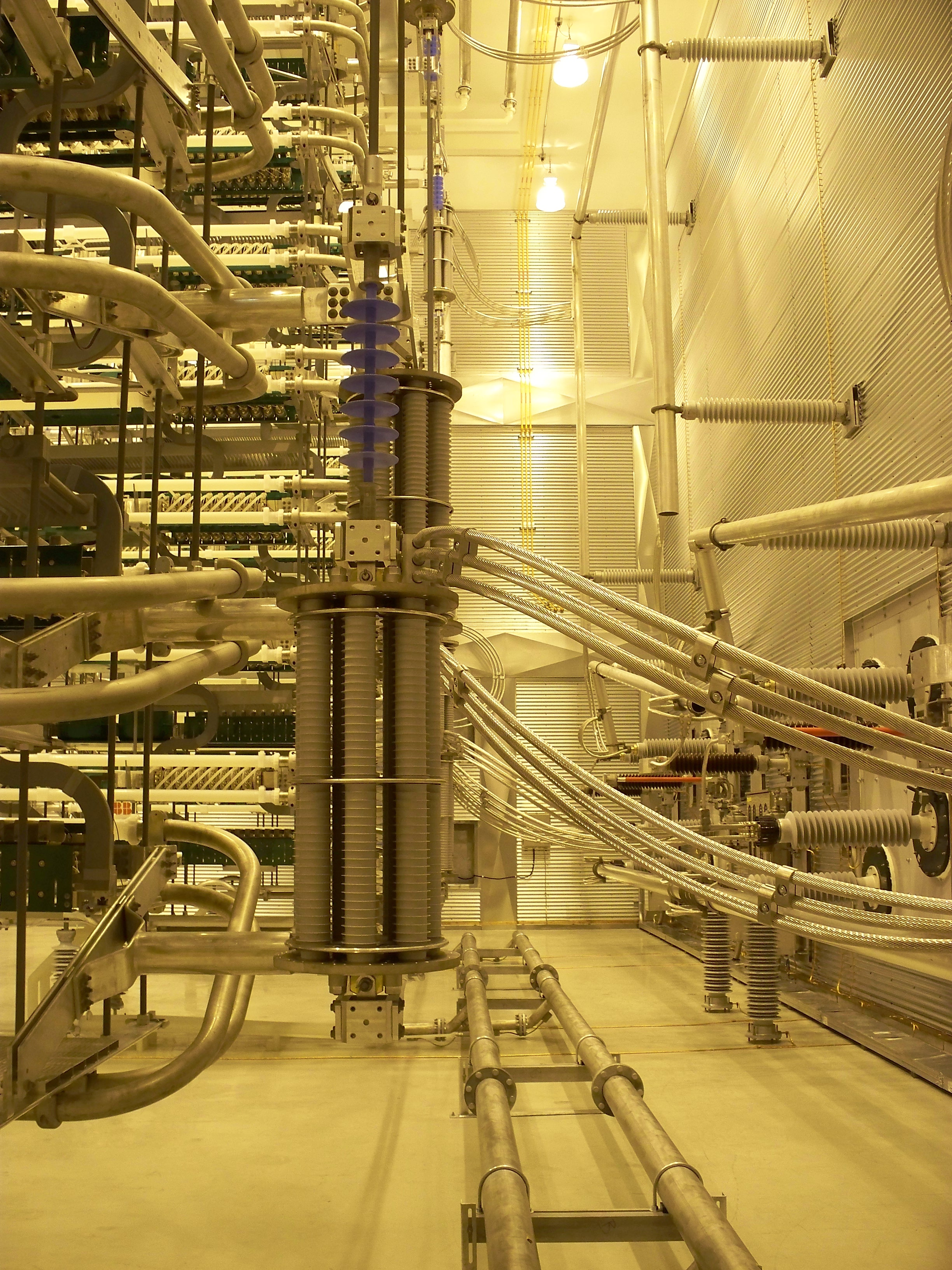
A rectifier at the Outaouais substation, located in L'Ange-Gardien. The 1,250 MW back-to-back HVDC tie links the Quebec grid with Ontario's Hydro One network.

The TransÉnergie's network operates asynchronously from that of its neighbours on the Eastern Interconnection. Although Quebec uses the same 60 hertz frequency as the rest of North America, its grid does not use the same phase as surrounding networks. TransÉnergie mainly relies on back to back HVDC converters to export or import electricity from other jurisdictions.

This feature of the Quebec network allowed Hydro-Québec to remain unscathed during the Northeast Blackout of August 14, 2003, with the exception of 5 hydro plants on the Ottawa River radially connected to the Ontario grid at the time. A new 1250-MW back to back HVDC tie has been commissioned at the Outaouais substation, in L'Ange-Gardien, near the Ontario border. The new interconnection has been online since 2009 and the 315 kV line is fully operational since 2010.

One drawback of the TransÉnergie network involves the long distances separating the generation sites and the main consumer markets. For instance, the Radisson substation links the James Bay project plants to the Nicolet station near Sainte-Eulalie, south of the Saint Lawrence, over 1,200 kilometres (750 mi) away.

==== Investments ====
In 2011, TransÉnergie invested C$1.3 billion in capital expenditures, including C$460 million to expand its network.

In addition to the new tie with Ontario, the company plans to build a new 1200-MW direct current link between the Des Cantons substation at Windsor, Quebec in Quebec's Eastern Townships and Deerfield, New Hampshire, with an HVDC converter terminal built at Franklin, New Hampshire. The US segment of the US$1.1 billion line, would be built by Northern Pass Transmission LLC, a partnership between Northeast Utilities (75%) and NSTAR (25%). In order to go ahead, the project must receive regulatory approval in Quebec and the United States. The proposed transmission line could be in operation in 2015. According to Jim Robb, a senior executive from Northeast Utilities, New England could meet one third of its Regional Greenhouse Gas Initiative commitments with the hydropower coming through this new power line alone.

=== Distribution ===
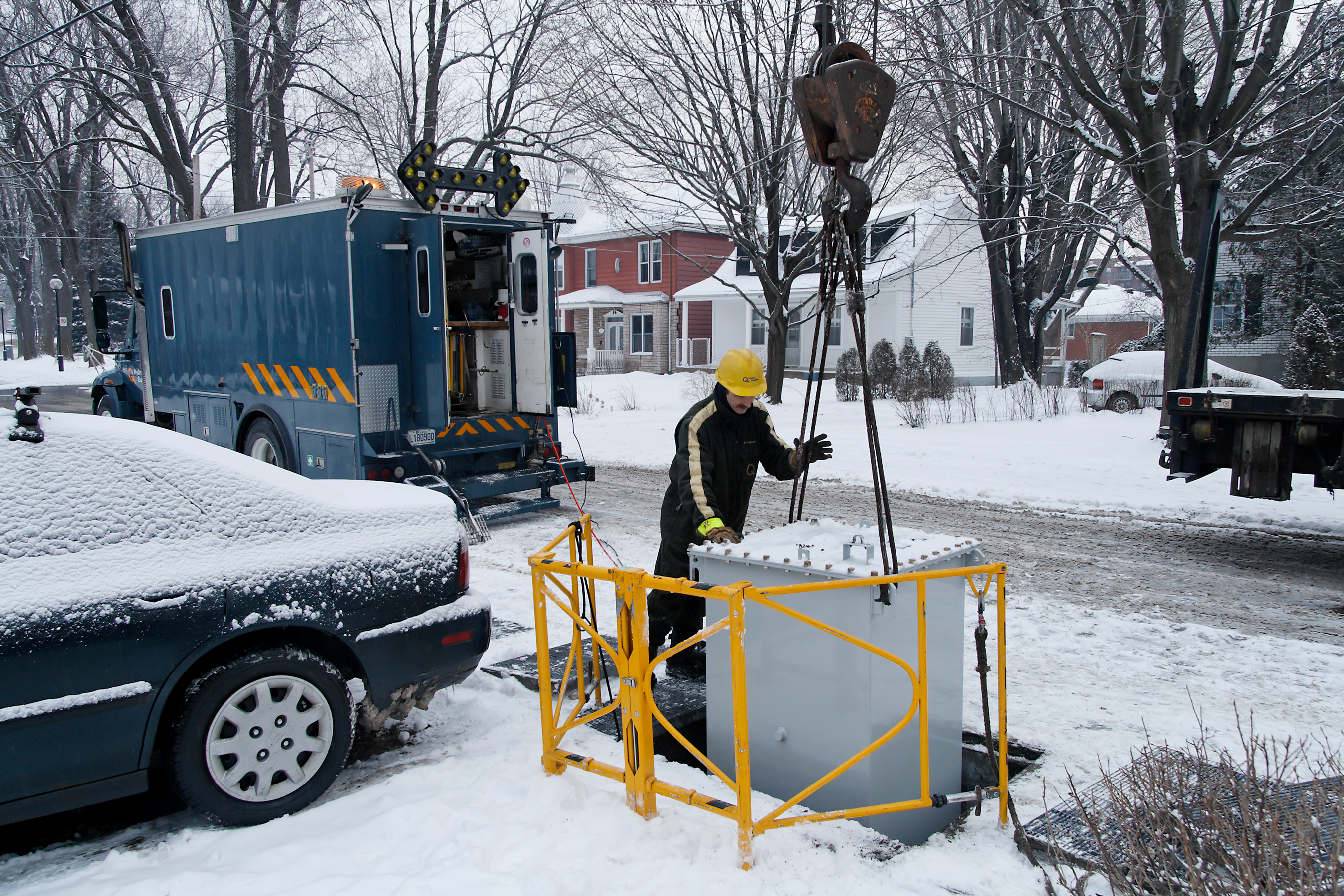
A Hydro-Québec employee carries out the replacement of an underground transformer in Montreal.

Hydro-Québec Distribution is in charge of retail sales to most customers in Quebec. It operates a network of 112,089 kilometres (69,649 mi) of medium and low voltage lines. The division is the sole electric distributor across the province, with the exception of 9 municipal distribution networks — in Alma, Amos, Baie-Comeau, Coaticook, Joliette, Magog, Saguenay, Sherbrooke and Westmount—and the electric cooperative of Saint-Jean-Baptiste de Rouville.

Hydro-Québec Distribution buys most of its power from the 165-TWh heritage pool provided by Hydro-Québec Production at 2.79¢/kWh. The division usually purchases additional power by entering into long-term contracts after a public call for tenders. For shorter term needs, it also buys power from the neighboring systems at market prices. As a last resort, Hydro-Québec Production can also provide short-term relief. Supply contracts above and beyond the heritage pool must be approved by the Régie de l'énergie du Québec and their costs are passed on to customers.

The division signed one natural gas cogeneration agreement for 507 MW in 2003, three forest biomass deals (47.5 MW) in 2004 and 2005, and ten contracts for wind power (2,994 MW) in 2005 and 2008, all with private sector producers. It also signed two flexible contracts with Hydro-Québec Production (600 MW) in 2002.

Hydro-Québec Distribution is also responsible for the production of power in remote communities not connected to the main power grid. The division operates an off-grid hydroelectric dam serving communities on the Lower North Shore and 23 small diesel power plants in the Magdalen Islands, in Haute-Mauricie and in Nunavik.

=== Other activities ===
==== Electric Circuit network ====
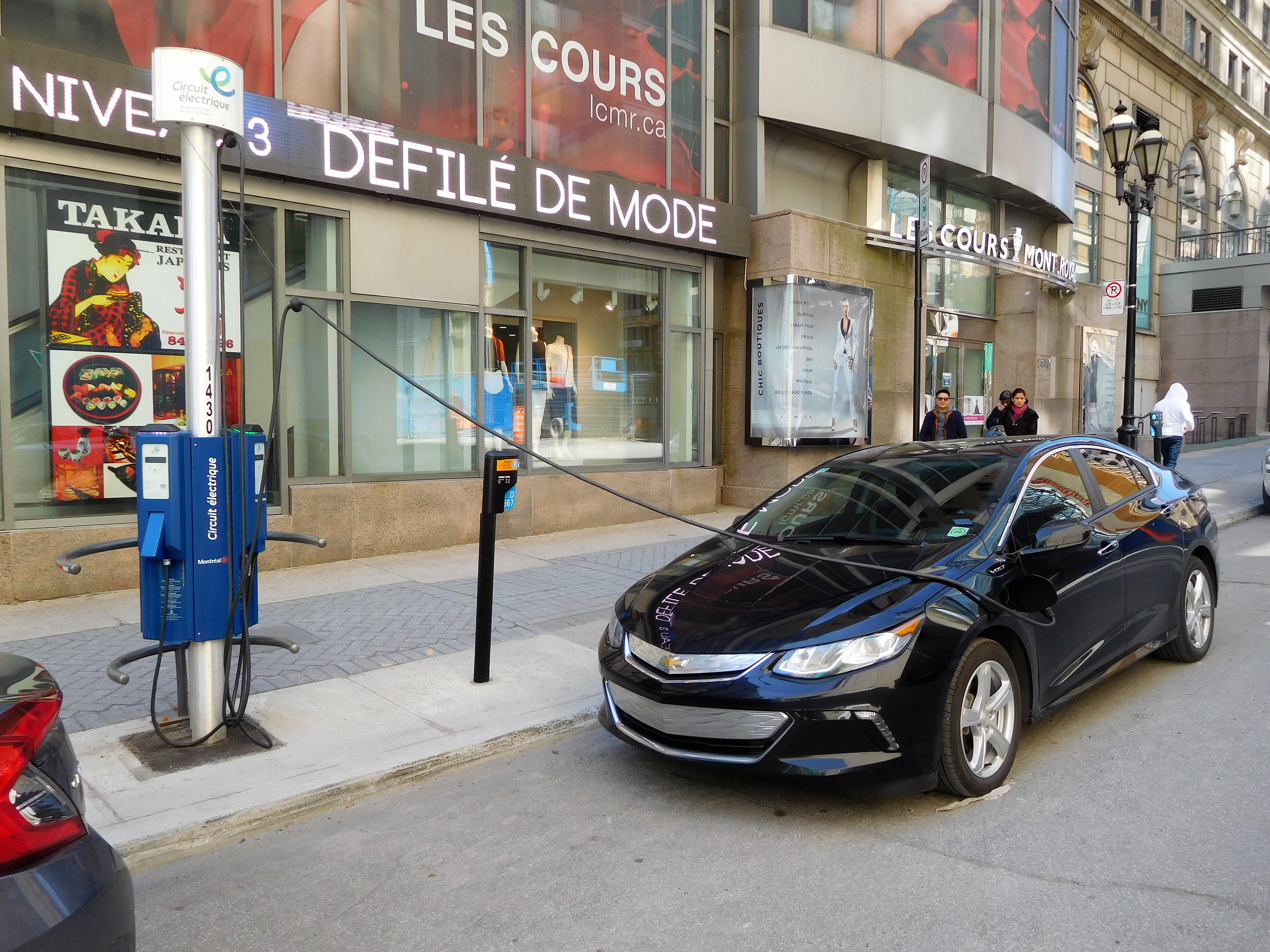
Electric Circuit level 2 charger in use in Montréal

In April 2011 the government of Quebec published a plan to encourage the adoption of electric vehicles, setting a target of 25% of cars sold in 2020 to be electric. The plan also called for provincial utility company Hydro-Quebec to develop a strategy for the deployment of public charging infrastructure. This resulted in the creation of "The Electric Circuit" (French: Le Circuit Électrique), the largest public network of charging stations for electric vehicles in Quebec. The first 30 charging stations were put into use in March 2012. The network's first 400V fast charger was installed in 2013.

As of 2023, The Electric Circuit offers almost 3,500 public charging stations in Quebec and eastern Ontario. Usage is also compatible with the FLO and New Brunswick E-charge network adaptors.

==== Research and development ====
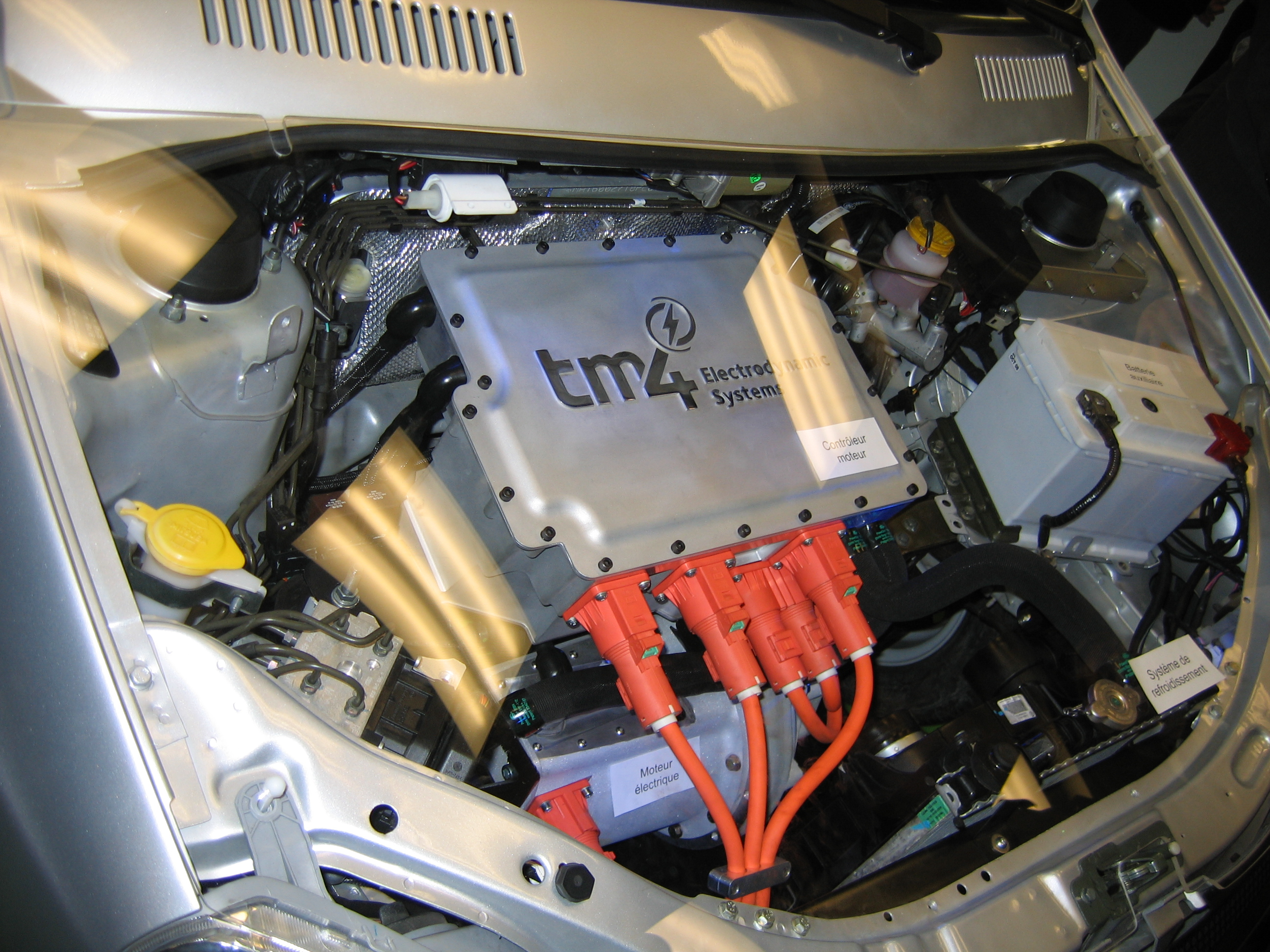
The TM4 electric engine was developed by Hydro-Québec.

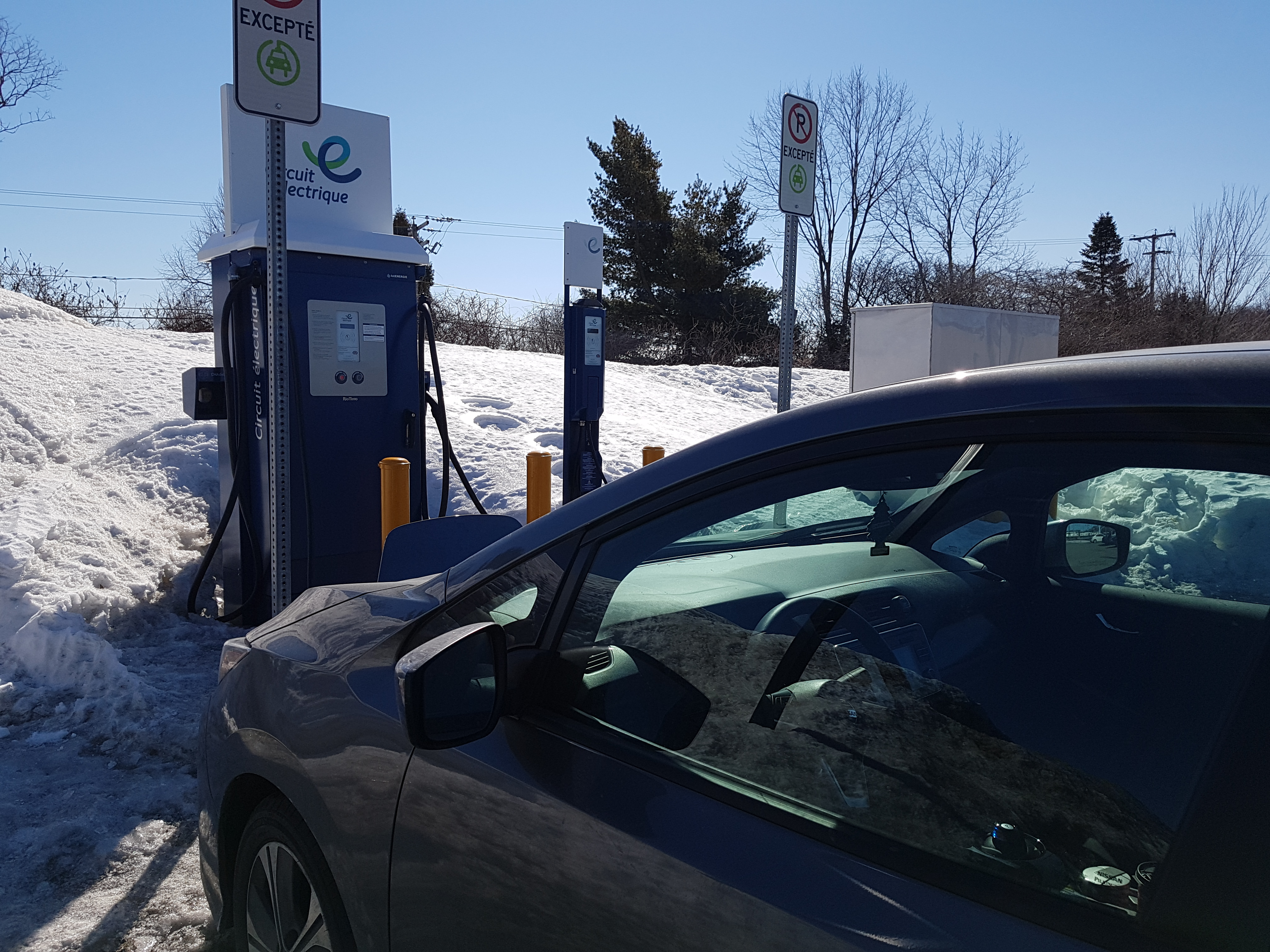
Hydro-Québec operates The Electric Circuit, the largest EV charging network in Quebec and Eastern Ontario.

Hydro-Québec has made significant investments in research and development over the past 40 years. In addition to funding university research, the company is the only electric utility in North America to operate its own large-scale research institute, L'Institut de recherche d'Hydro-Québec (IREQ). Established by Lionel Boulet in 1967, the research centre is located in Varennes, a suburb on the South Shore of Montreal. IREQ operates on an annual research budget of approximately C$100 million and specializes in the areas of high voltage, mechanics and thermomechanics, network simulations and calibration.

Research conducted by scientists and engineers at IREQ has helped to extend the life of dams, improve water turbine performance, automate network management and increase the transmission capacity of high voltage power lines.

Another research centre, the Laboratoire des technologies de l'énergie (LTE) in Shawinigan, was opened in 1988 to adapt and develop new products while helping industrial customers improve their energy efficiency.

In the last 20 years, the institute has also conducted research and development work towards the electrification of ground transportation. Current projects include battery materials, including innovative work on lithium iron phosphate and nano-titanate, improved electric drive trains and the effects of the large-scale deployment of electric vehicles on the power grid. Projects focus on technologies to increase range, improve performance in cold weather and reduce charging time.

Hydro-Québec has been criticized for not having taken advantage of some of its innovations. An electric wheel motor concept that struck a chord with Quebecers, first prototyped in 1994 by Pierre Couture, an engineer and physicist working at IREQ, is one of these. The heir to the Couture wheel motor is now marketed by TM4 Electrodynamic Systems, a spin-off established in 1998 that has made deals with France's Dassault and Heuliez to develop an electric car, the Cleanova, of which prototypes were built in 2006. Hydro-Québec announced in early 2009 at the Montreal International Auto Show that its engine had been chosen by Tata Motors to equip a demonstration version of its Indica model, which will be road tested in Norway.

==== Construction ====
The Hydro-Québec Équipement division acts as the company's main contractor on major construction sites, with the exception of work conducted on the territory covered by the James Bay and Northern Quebec Agreement, which are assigned to the Société d'énergie de la Baie James subsidiary.

The construction of a complex of four hydroelectric generating stations on the Romaine River (1,550 MW) began on May 13, 2009. The plants have been completed as of 2022 and have added a total of 1 550 MW of power.

In his March 2009 inaugural speech, Quebec Premier Jean Charest announced that his government intends to further develop the province's hydroelectric potential. The call for further development of hydroelectric and other renewable generating capacity has been implemented in the company's 2009-2013 strategic plan, released on July 30, 2009. Hydro-Québec plans capacity upgrades at the Jean-Lesage (120 MW) and René-Lévesque (210 MW) stations and a third unit at the SM-3 plant (440 MW). The company will also conduct technical and environmental studies and undertake consultations with local communities to build new facilities on the Little Mecatina (1,200 MW) and Magpie (850 MW) rivers on the North Shore, and revive the Tabaret project (132 MW) in the Abitibi-Témiscamingue region, in western Quebec.

==== International ventures ====
Hydro-Québec first forays outside its borders began in 1978. A new subsidiary, Hydro-Québec International, was created to market the company's know-how abroad in the fields of distribution, generation and transmission of electricity. The new venture leveraged the existing pool of expertise in the parent company.

During the next 25 years, Hydro-Québec was particularly active abroad with investments in electricity transmission networks and generation: Transelec in Chile, the Cross Sound Cable in the United States, the Consorcio Transmantaro in Peru, Hidroelectrica Rio Lajas in Costa Rica, Murraylink in Australia and the Fortuna generating station in Panama.

It briefly held a 17% share in SENELEC, Senegal's electric utility, when the Senegalese government decided to sell part of the company to a consortium led by the French company Elyo, a subsidiary of Group Suez Lyonnaise des Eaux, in 1999. The transaction was canceled in 2000 following the election of president Abdoulaye Wade.

Also in 1999, Hydro-Québec International acquired a 20% stake in the Meiya Power Company in China for C$83 million. The company held this participation until July 2004. The company's expertise was sought by several hydroelectric developers throughout the world, including the Three Gorges Dam, where Hydro's employees trained Chinese engineers in the fields of management, finance and dams.

Hydro-Québec gradually withdrew from the international business between 2003 and 2006, and sold off all of its foreign investments for a profit. Proceeds from these sales were paid to the government's Generations Fund, a trust fund set up by the province to alleviate the effect of public debt on future generations.

In 2022, Hydro-Québec, through its US Subsidiary HQI US Holding, acquired Great River Hydro, LLC. for the sum of US$2.2 billion.

== Environment ==
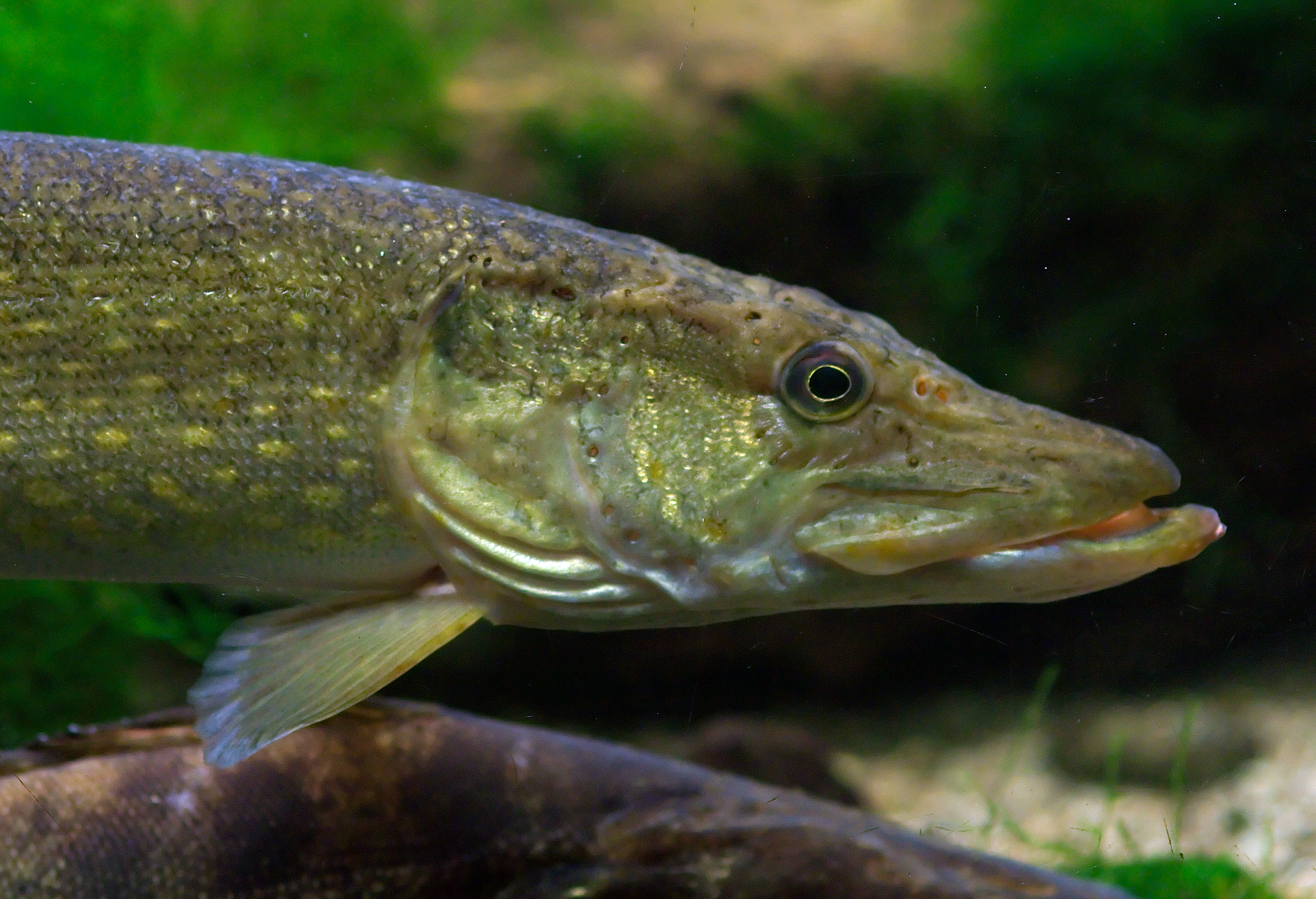
The northern pike (Esox lucius) is more prevalent today in the Robert-Bourassa Reservoir than it was before the flooding of the reservoir. The increase of this population has been counterbalanced by a decline in the walleye (Stizostedion vitreum) population.

The construction and operation of electric generation, transmission and distribution facilities has environmental effects. Hydroelectric development affects the natural environment where facilities are built and on the people living in the area. The development of new reservoirs increases the level of mercury in lakes and rivers, which works up the food chain. It temporarily increases the emission of greenhouse gases from reservoirs and contributes to shoreline erosion.

Hydroelectric facilities can transform the human environment. They create new obstacles to navigation, flood traditional hunting and trapping grounds, force people to change eating habits due to the elevated mercury content of some fish species, destroy artifacts related to historic human presence on the territory, and disrupt the society and culture of Aboriginal people living near the facilities.

Since the early 1970s, Hydro-Québec has been aware of the environmental externalities of its operations. The adoption of a Quebec statute on environmental quality in 1972, the cancellation of Champigny Project, a planned pumped storage plant in the Jacques-Cartier River valley in 1973, and the James Bay negotiations leading to the James Bay and Northern Quebec Agreement in 1975, forced the company to reconsider its practices.

To address environmental concerns, Hydro-Québec established an environmental protection committee in 1970 and an Environmental Management unit in September 1973. Its mandate is to study and measure the environmental effects of the company, prepare impact assessment, and develop mitigation strategies for new and existing facilities, while conducting research projects in these areas, in cooperation with the scientific community.

=== Effects on the natural environment ===
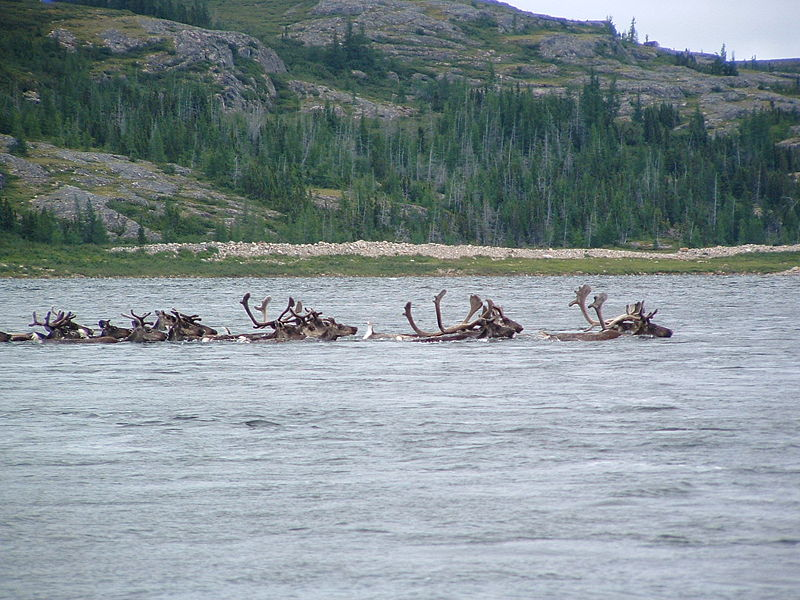
The caribou population near major reservoirs in northern Quebec has increased between 1970 and 2000.

In the late 1970s, the company set up a network of 27 monitoring stations to measure the effects of the James Bay Project which provide a wealth of data on northern environments. The first 30 years of studies in the James Bay area have confirmed that mercury levels in fish increase by 3 to 6 times over the first 5 to 10 years after the flooding of a reservoir, but then gradually revert to their initial values after 20 to 30 years. These results confirm similar studies conducted elsewhere in Canada, the United States and Finland. Research also found that it is possible to reduce human exposure to mercury even when fish constitutes a significant part of a population's diet. Exposure risks can be mitigated without overly reducing the consumption of fish, simply by avoiding certain species and fishing spots.

Despite the fact that the transformation of terrestrial environments into aquatic ones constitutes a major change and that flooding leads to the displacement or death of nonmigratory animals, the riparian environments lost through flooding are partially replaced by new ones on the exposed banks of reduced-flow rivers. The biological diversity of reservoir islands is comparable to other islands in the area and the reservoir drawdown zone is used by a variety of wildlife. The population of migratory species of interest such as the caribou have increased to the point where the hunt has been expanded.

Emissions of greenhouse gases (GHG) rise significantly for a few years after reservoir impoundment, and then stabilize after 10 years to a level similar to that of surrounding lakes. Gross GHG emissions of reservoirs in the James Bay area fluctuate around 30,000 tonnes of CO_{2} equivalent per TWh of generated power. Hydro-Québec claims its hydroelectric plants release 35 times less GHG than comparable gas-fired plants and 70 times less than coal-fired ones and that they constitute the "option with the best performance" overall.

=== Social effects and sustainable development ===
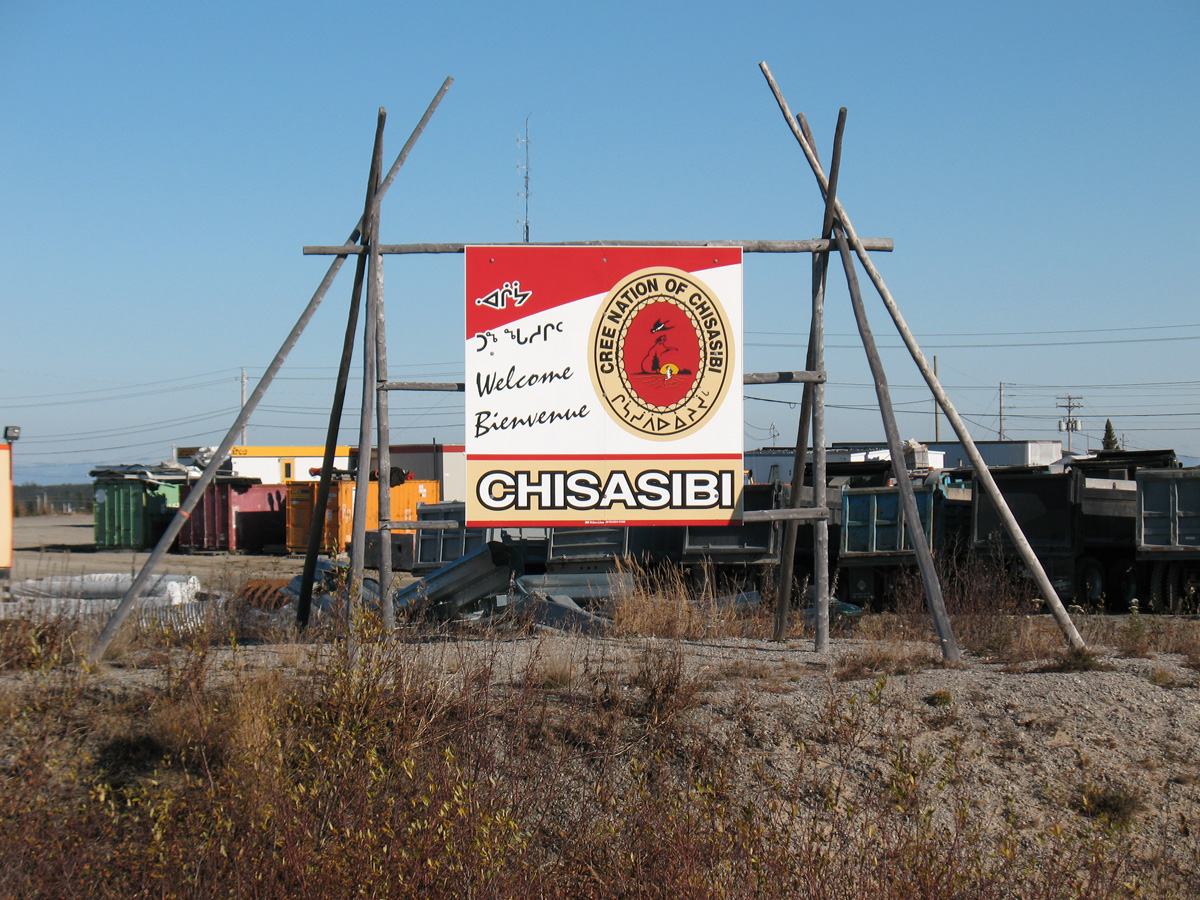
Of all Cree communities, Chisasibi was most affected by the James Bay hydroelectric development project Crees living on Fort George island resettled to the new village on the left bank of La Grande River in 1980–1981.

Major environmental concerns relates to the human population of areas affected by hydroelectric development, specifically the Innu of the North Shore and the Cree and Inuit in Northern Quebec. The hydroelectric developments of the last quarter of the 20th century have accelerated the settling process among Aboriginal populations that started in the 1950s. Among the reasons cited for the increased adoption of a sedentary lifestyle among these peoples are the establishment of Aboriginal businesses, the introduction of paid labor, and the flooding of traditional trapping and fishing lands by the new reservoirs, along with the operation of social and education services run by the communities themselves under the James Bay and Northern Quebec Agreement.

Some native communities, particularly the Crees, have come to a point "where they increasingly resemble the industrialized society of the South", notes a Hydro-Québec report summarizing the research conducted in the area between 1970 and 2000. The report adds that a similar phenomenon was observed after the construction of roads and hydroelectric plants near isolated communities in northern Canada and Scandinavia. However, growing social problems and rising unemployment have followed the end of the large construction projects in the 1990s. The report concludes that future economic and social development in the area "will largely depend on the desire for cooperation among the various players".

After the strong rejection of the Suroît project and its subsequent cancellation in November 2004, Hydro-Québec, under the leadership of its new CEO Thierry Vandal, reaffirmed Hydro-Québec's commitment towards energy efficiency, hydropower and development of alternative energy. Since then, Hydro-Québec regularly stresses three criteria for any new hydroelectric development undertaken by the company: projects must be cost effective, environmentally acceptable and well received by the communities. Hydro-Québec has also taken part in a series of sustainable development initiatives since the late 1980s. Its approach is based on three principles: economic development, social development and environmental protection. Since 2007 the company adheres to the Global Reporting Initiative, which governs the collection and publication of sustainability performance information. The company employs 250 professionals and managers in the environmental field and has implemented an ISO 14001-certified environmental management system.

The Innu Nation filed a $4 billion claim against Hydro-Québec in October 2020 to receive compensation for damages caused by the Churchill Falls Generating Station.

== Rates and customers ==
=== Quebec market ===
Operating statistics as of December 31, 2010 and 2011
	Number of customers		Sales in Quebec (GWh)		Revenue (C$M)		Average annual consumption (kWh)	
	2011	2010	2011	2010	2011	2010	2011	2010
Residential and farm	3,746,397	3,698,169	62,748	59,534	4,536	4,302	16,857	16,205
General and institutional	291,212	300,163	33,569	33,865	2,599	2,648	113,529	113,347
Industrial	18,573	9,589	67,621	68,439	3,262	3,185	4,802,287	7,049,027
Others	4,013	3,868	6,028	7,647	323	371	1,529,755	2,033,506
Total	4,060,195	4,011,789	169,966	169,495	10,720	10,506		

Evolution of Hydro-Québec residential rates (turquoise) and the Quebec Consumer price index (dark blue) between 1998 and 2011.

At the end of 2010, Hydro-Québec served 4,060,195 customers grouped into three broad categories: residential and farm (D Rate), commercial and institutional (G Rate) and industrial (M and L rates). The Other category includes public lighting systems and municipal distribution systems.

About a dozen distribution rates are set annually by the Régie de l'énergie after public hearings. Pricing is based on the cost of delivery, which includes the cost of supply and transmission, depreciation on fixed assets and provisions for the maintenance of facilities, customer growth and a profit margin.

Rates are uniform throughout Quebec and are based on consumer type and volume of consumption. All rates vary in block to mitigate any cross-subsidization effect between residential, commercial and industrial customers.

Hydro-Québec retail rates are among the lowest in North America. After a five-year rate freeze, between May 1, 1998 and January 1, 2004, the Régie granted rate increases on 8 occasions between 2004 and 2010 for a total of 18.4%. More recently, the regulator ordered two successive rate rollbacks in 2011 (0.4%) and 2012 (0.5%). However, rates are expected to go up by 3.7% a year from 2014 to 2018 to reflect a gradual increase of heritage pool electricity announced in the 2010 Quebec budget.

==== Residential customers ====
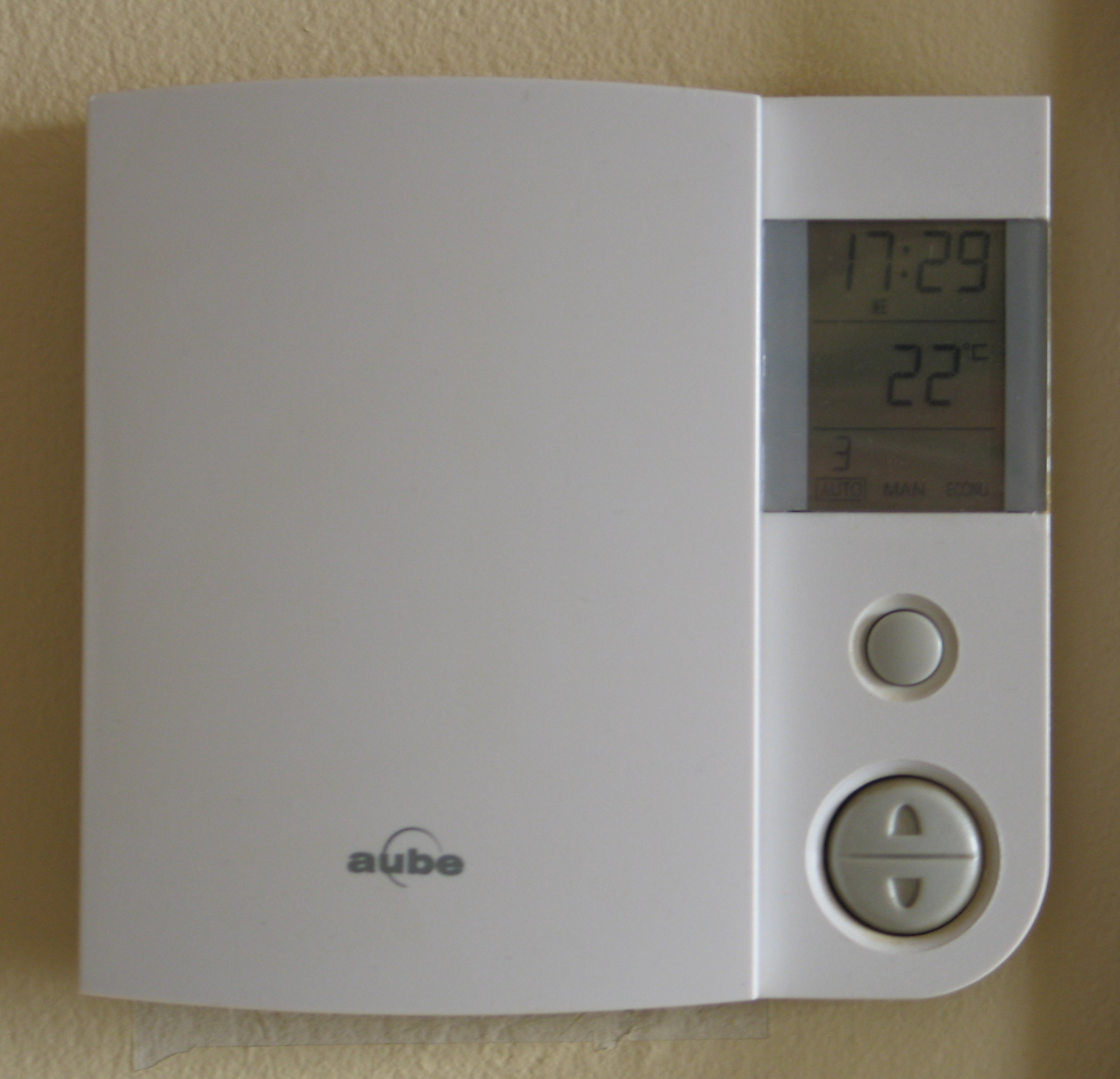
Electric heating accounts for more than half of the electricity used by residential customers in Quebec, according to Hydro-Québec.

The average consumption of residential and agricultural customers is relatively high, at 16,857 kWh per year in 2011, because of the widespread use of electricity as the main source of space (77%) and water heating (90%). Hydro-Québec estimates that heating accounts for more than one half of the electricity demand in the residential sector.

This preference for electric heating makes electricity demand more unpredictable, but offers some environmental benefits. Despite Quebec's very cold climate in winter, greenhouse gases emissions in the residential sector accounted for only 5.5% (4.65 Mt CO_{2} eq.) of all emissions in Quebec in 2006. Emissions from the residential sector in Quebec fell by 30% between 1990 and 2006.

Residential use of electricity fluctuates from one year to another, and is strongly correlated with the weather. Contrary to the trend in neighboring networks, Hydro-Québec's system is winter-peaking. A new all-time consumption record was set on January 23, 2013 with a load of 38,910 MW. Previous records were established on January 24, 2011 with 37,717 MW, on January 16, 2009, with a load of 37,230 MW, and on January 15, 2004 when peak reached 36,268 MW.

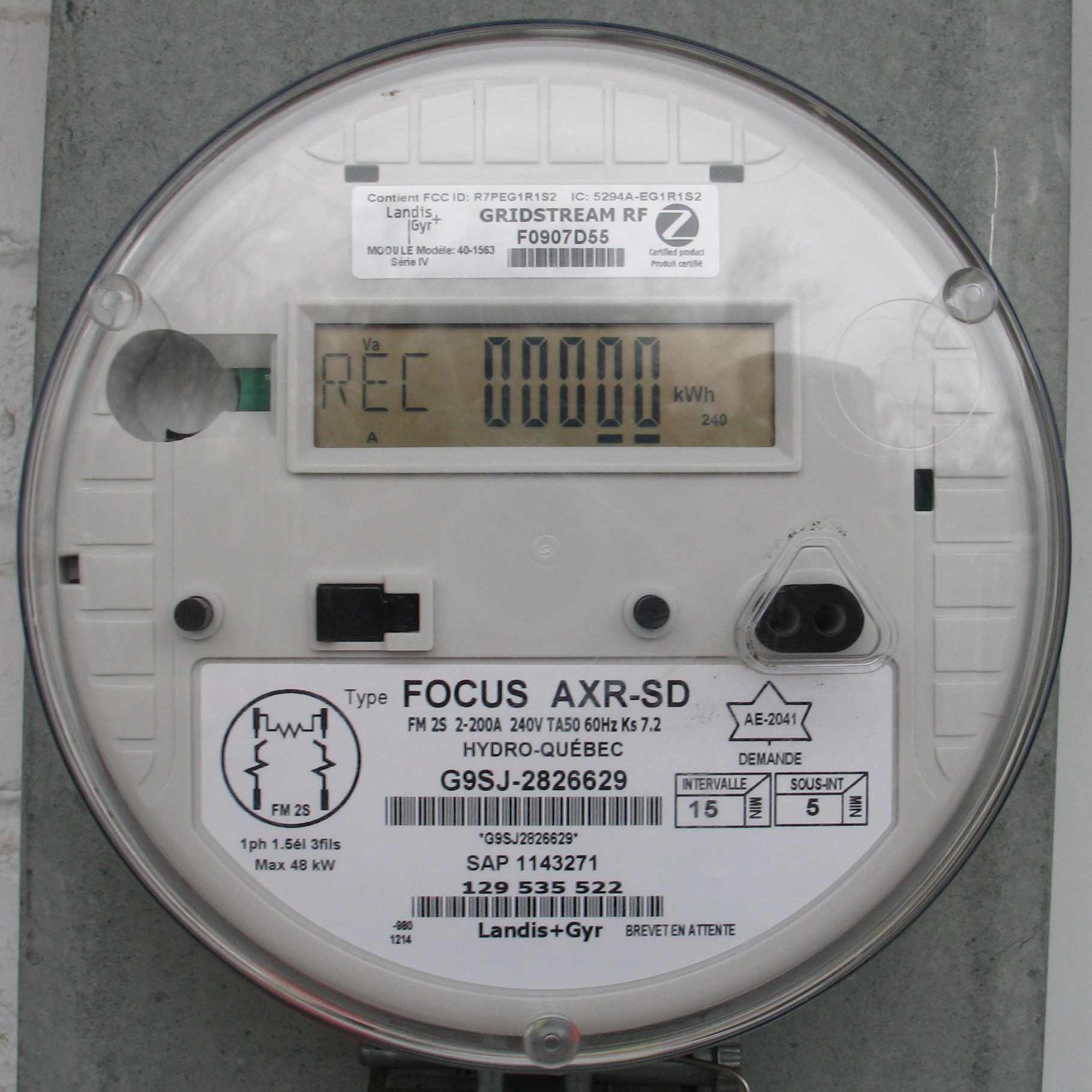
A Hydro-Québec digital power meter.

The price of electricity for residences and farms includes a 40.64¢ daily subscription fee, and two price levels depending on consumption. The rates are all-included: power, transmission and distribution costs, but are subject to the Goods and Services Tax (GST) and the Quebec Sales Tax (QST). As of April 1, 2012, customers pay 5.32¢/kWh for the first 30 daily kWh, while the remainder is sold at 7.51¢/kWh. The average monthly bill for a residential customer was approximately C$100 in 2008.

Electric meter readings are usually conducted every two months and bills are bimonthly. However, the company offers an optional Equalized Payment Plan allowing residential customers to pay their annual electricity costs in 12 monthly installments, based on past consumption patterns of the current customer address and the average temperature in that location.

In 2007, Hydro-Québec pulled out of a Canadian government initiative to install smart meters across the province, stating that it would be "too costly to deliver real savings". Since then, Hydro-Québec organized a 2-year pilot project, involving 2,000 customers in 4 cities, with time of use metering. A report, filed with the Régie de l'énergie, in the summer of 2010 concluded that the effect of marginal cost pricing with three levels of pricing in the winter would lead to minimal load and energy savings. The company intends to gradually phase-in Advanced Metering Infrastructure (AMI) between 2011 and 2017. Early efforts will focus on meter data transfer, connect-disconnect, outage detection and theft reduction.

==== Industrial customers ====
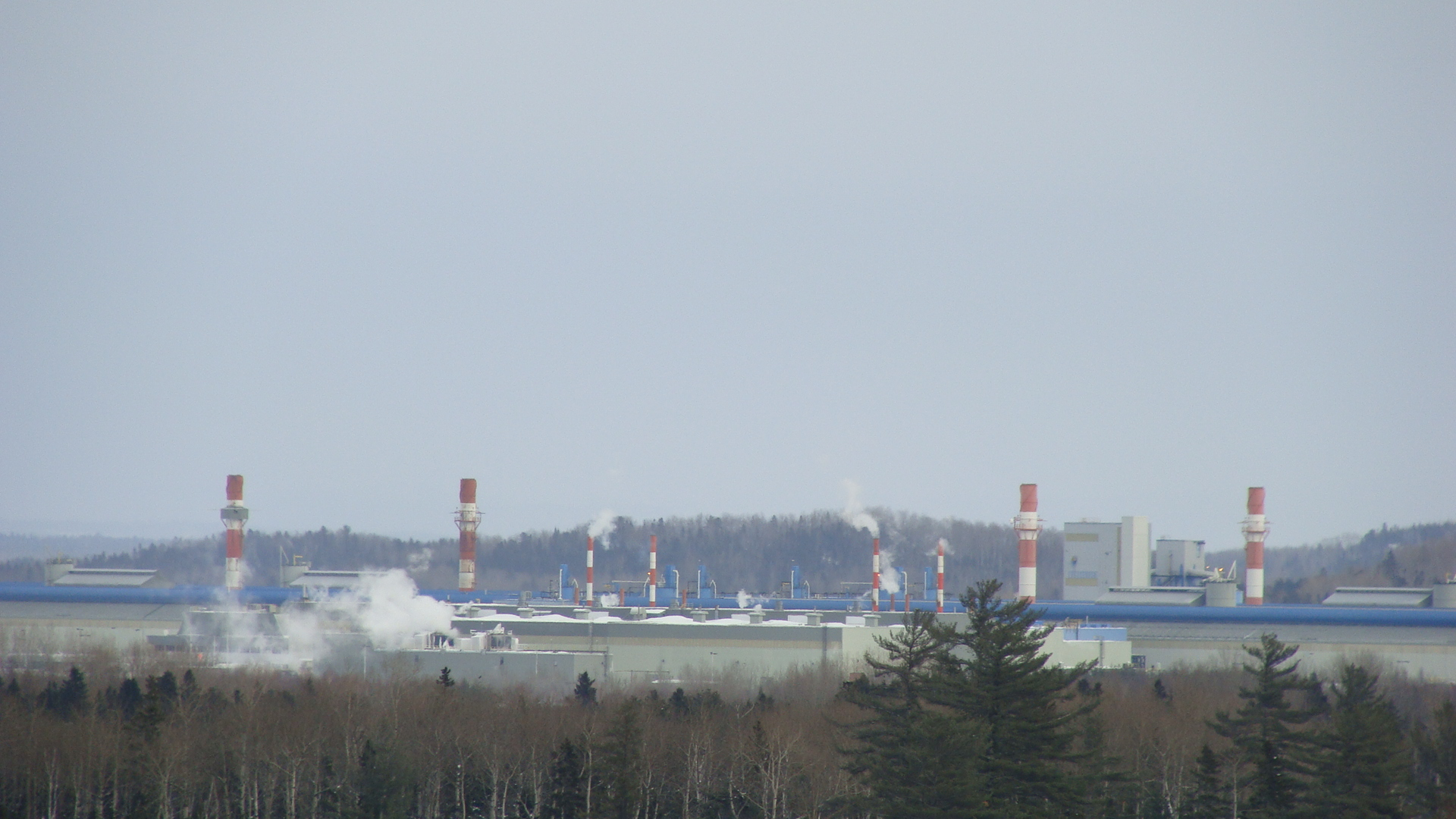
Rio Tinto Alcan's Laterriere smelter in Saguenay. Large industrial users, especially the metallurgy and the pulp and paper industries, use 40.6% of all electricity sold in Quebec.

For more than a century, industrial development in Quebec has been stimulated by the abundance of hydroelectric resources. Energy represents a significant expenditure in the pulp and paper and aluminum sectors, two industries with long-standing traditions in Quebec. In 2010, industrial customers purchased 68.4 TWh from Hydro-Québec, representing 40.4% of all electricity sold by the company on the domestic market.

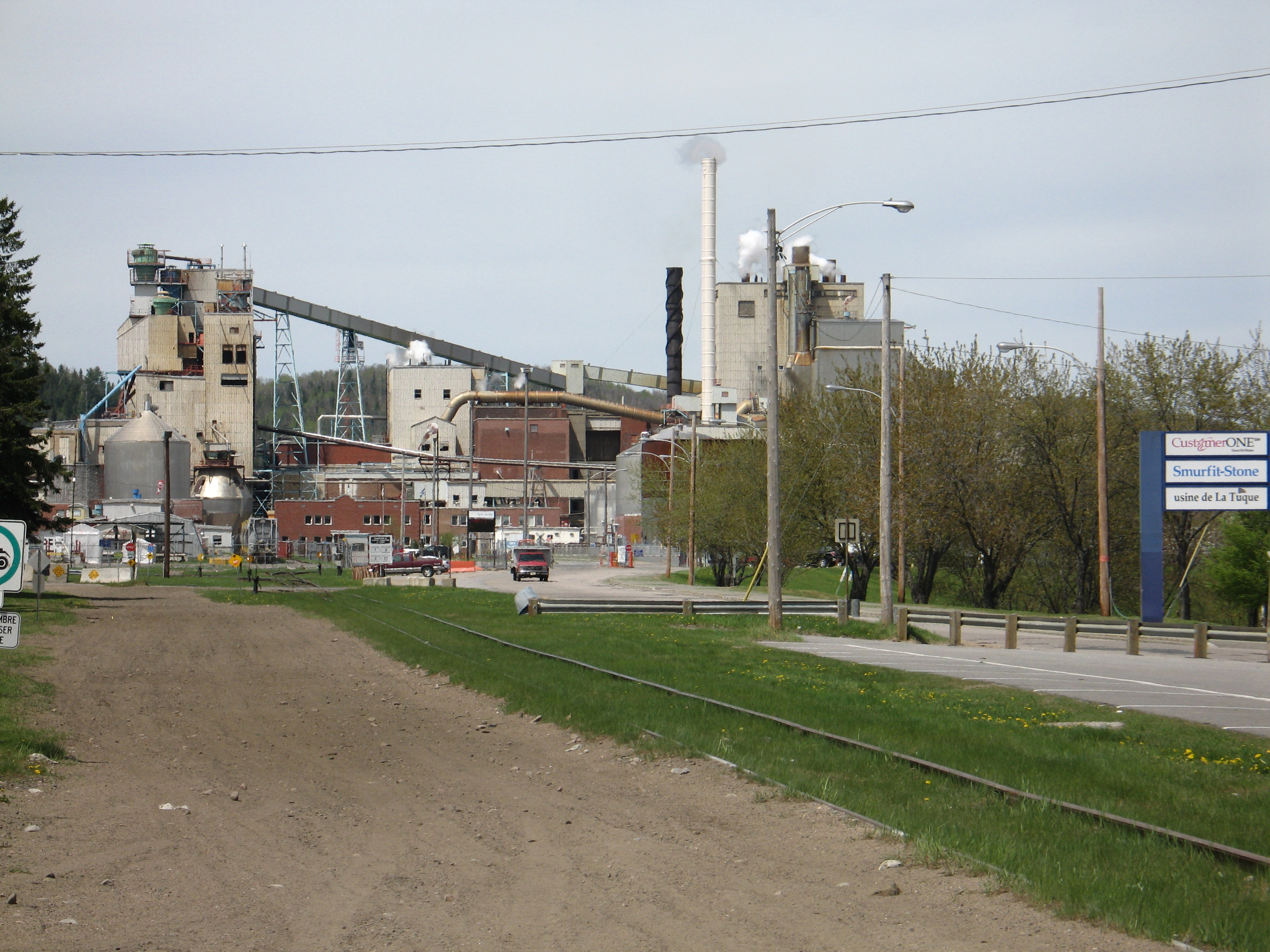
The Smurfit-Stone paper mill in La Tuque.

The Quebec government uses low electricity rates to attract new business and consolidate existing jobs. Despite its statutory obligation to sell electric power to every person who so requests, the province has reserved the right to grant large load allocations to companies on a case-by-case basis since 1974. The threshold was set at 175 MW from 1987 to 2006 and was reduced to 50 MW in the government's 2006–2015 energy strategy.

Large industrial users pay a lower rate than the domestic and commercial customers, because of lower distribution costs. In 2010, the largest industrial users, the Rate L customers, were paying an average of 4.66¢/kWh whereas companies with special contracts paid 3.07¢/kWh.

In 1987, Hydro-Québec and the Quebec government agreed to a series of controversial deals with aluminum giants Alcan and Alcoa. These risk sharing contracts set the price of electricity based on a series of factors, including aluminum world prices and the value of the Canadian dollar Those agreements are gradually being replaced by one based on published rates.

On May 10, 2007, the Quebec government signed an agreement with Alcan. The agreement, which is still in force despite the company's merger with Rio Tinto, renews the water rights concession on the Saguenay and Peribonka rivers. In exchange, Alcan has agreed to invest in its Quebec facilities and to maintain jobs and its corporate headquarters in Montreal.

On December 19, 2008, Hydro-Québec and Alcoa signed a similar agreement. This agreement, which expires in 2040, maintains the provision of electricity to Alcoa's three aluminum smelters in the province, located in Baie-Comeau, Bécancour and Deschambault-Grondines. In addition, the deal will allow Alcoa to modernize the Baie-Comeau plant which will increase its production capacity by 110,000 tonnes a year, to a total of 548,000 tonnes.

Several economists, including Université Laval's Jean-Thomas Bernard and Gérard Bélanger, have challenged the government's strategy and argue that sales to large industrial customers are very costly to the Quebec economy. In an article published in 2008, the researchers estimate that, under the current regime, a job in a new aluminum smelter or an expansion project costs the province between C$255,357 and C$729,653 a year, when taking into consideration the money that could be made by selling the excess electricity on the New York market.

This argument is disputed by large industrial customers, who point out that data from 2000 to 2006 indicate that electricity exports prices get lower when quantities increase, and vice versa. "We find that the more we export, the less lucrative it gets", said Luc Boulanger, the head of the association representing Quebec's large industrial customers. In his opinion, the high volatility of electricity markets and the transmission infrastructure physical limitations reduce the quantities of electricity that can be exported when prices are higher.

Hydro Quebec gained attention with Bitcoin miners in 2018 after the crackdown on mining in China. The province has an energy surplus equivalent to 10 Terawatt hours per year.

=== Export markets ===
Hydro-Québec exports and brokerage activities in Canada and the United States (2019-2023)
	2023	2022	2021	2020	2019
Exports (TWh) (Note: 1 TWh= 1 billion kWh.)	23.0	35.6	36.2	32.4	34.8
Revenue ($M)	2,365	2,912	1,826	1,466	1,571

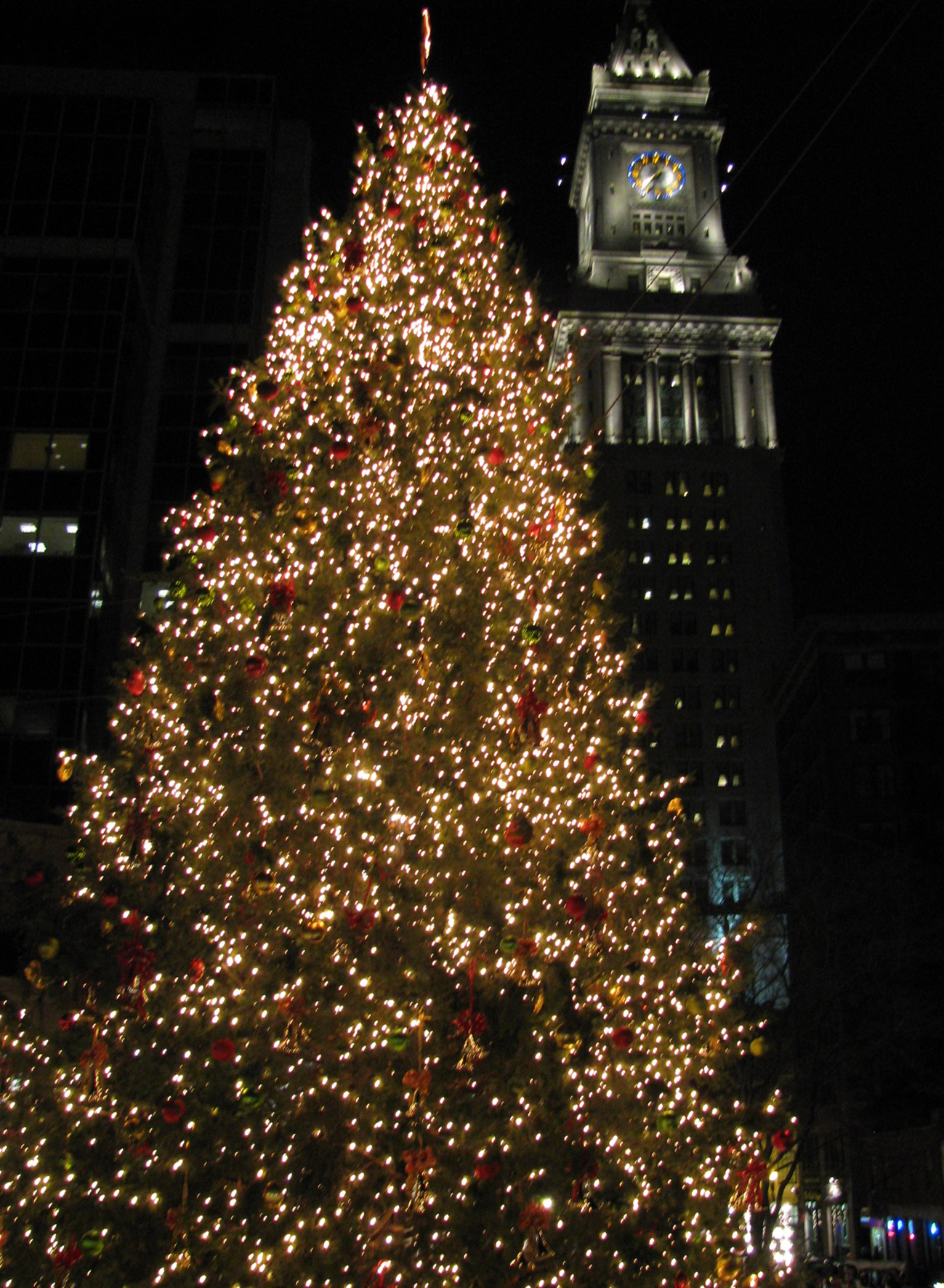
Part of the electricity used in Boston comes from the remote dams in the James Bay area.

Hydro-Québec sells part of its surplus electricity to neighbouring systems in Canada and the United States under long-term contracts and transactions on the New England, New York and Ontario bulk energy markets. In 2017, net exports revenues were at $1,651 million for a total of 34.4 TWh sent to New England (53%), New York (23%), Ontario (13%) and other (5%).

Although most export sales are now short-term transactions, Hydro-Québec has entered into long-term export contracts in the past. The corporation has 15 interconnections to neighboring markets. In 1990, the company signed a 328-MW deal with a group of 13 electric distributors in Vermont. On March 11, 2010, Vermont's two largest utilities, Green Mountain Power and Central Vermont Public Service, entered into a tentative 26-year deal with Hydro-Québec to purchase up to 225 MW of hydro power from 2012 to 2038. The memorandum of understanding provides for a price smoothing mechanism shielding Vermont customers from market price spikes. The deal is contingent upon the enactment designating large hydro as "renewable energy".

In 2015, Hydro-Quebec and the Ontario Independent Electricity System Operator (IESO) signed a 500-MW seasonal capacity sharing agreement. Ontario has increased capacity in the Winter, and shortages in the summer. Quebec has increased capacity in the summer, and shortages in the Winter. Thus, the agreement serves as to achieve a cost-effective solution for both provinces. Furthermore, in 2016 (IESO) and Hydro-Quebec signed a new long-term agreement starting in 2017 until 2023. The deal will send 2TWh per year to Ontario. On the other hand, Quebec should receive capacity from Ontario during Winter's peak demand.

== Presidents ==
List of presidents for Hydro-Québec
Rank	Name	Nomination date
1st	Télesphore-Damien Bouchard	April 15, 1944
2nd	L.-Eugène Potvin	June 29, 1944
3rd	J.-Arthur Savoie	June 1, 1955
4th	Jean-Claude Lessard	September 7, 1960
5th	Roland Giroux	August 1, 1969
6th	Robert A. Boyd	1977
7th	Lucien Saulnier	1978
8th	Guy Coulombe	January 15, 1982
9th	Richard Drouin	May 2, 1988
10th	Yvon Martineau	1995
11th	Benoît Michel	December 1, 1995
12th	André Caillé	October 1, 1996
13th	Thierry Vandal	April 5, 2005
14th	Éric Martel	June 3, 2015
15th	Sophie Brochu	April 1, 2020
16th	Michael Sabia	August 1, 2023
17th	Claudine Bouchard	July 5, 2025

From 1944 to 1978, management of Hydro-Québec consisted of five commissioners, one of them acting as president.

== Influence of Cross-Border Transmission Research ==
In addition to the long-standing focus on large-scale transmission expansion, contemporary research—such as that presented by Gazar et al. (2024)—has investigated the causal relationships between cross-border transmission capacity, new hydroelectric generation, and evolving energy demand in the northeastern United States and Canada. Their Bayesian network analysis suggests that increases in Quebec's hydroelectric capacity historically correlate more strongly with domestic demand and market price signals, rather than simply the availability of expanded transmission corridors. These findings can inform discussions of whether newly proposed U.S.–Canada intertie projects should include upstream reservoir development in environmental impact assessments.

== See also ==
- Édifice Hydro-Québec
- James Bay Project
- Hydro-Québec's electricity transmission system
- Timeline of Quebec history

== See also ==
- Karim Zaghib
