= Erica Vandal =

American military officer

Personal details
- Born: Baumholder, Germany
- Parent: Thomas S. Vandal (father)
- Education: United States Military Academy
- Awards: Bronze Star Medal; Meritorious Service Medal

Military service
- Branch/service: United States Army
- Years of service: 2011–2025
- Rank: Major
- Battles/wars: Operation Enduring Freedom

Erica Vandal is an American retired military officer. She served during Operation Enduring Freedom, leading artillery teams in returning fire against Taliban attacks in Afghanistan. She was awarded a Bronze Star Medal for her service in combat. In 2025, she was forcibly retired from the military under President Donald Trump's Executive Order 14183, which banned transgender people from military service. She became a plaintiff in the court case Talbott v. United States, which challenged the ban.

== Early life, family, and education ==
Vandal was born to American parents in Baumholder, Germany, and raised in a military family. Her father, Lieutenant General Thomas S. Vandal, was a United States Army officer with a 36-year-long military career who commanded the Eighth Army in South Korea.

As a military brat, Vandal lived in around two dozen different houses growing up, both in the United States and abroad. Her brothers served as pilots in the United States Navy and United States Marine Corps.

Vandal graduated from Hohenfels Middle High School in Hohenfels, Konstanz, before graduating with honors from the United States Military Academy in 2011.

== Career ==
Vandal served in the Army for fourteen years. In 2011, she was commissioned into field artillery and deployed to Afghanistan, where she commanded artillery teams in returning fire against Taliban rocket and mortar attacks, as well as over a hundred soldiers. She was awarded a Bronze Star Medal for her leadership in combat. She was later awarded a Meritorious Service Medal.

After serving in Afghanistan, Vandal served on crisis response teams in South Korea and supported NATO allies in Romania.

Vandal sought therapy for gender dysphoria in 2019 and came out as a trans woman in 2021, while serving in South Korea. She was a mentor to other transgender service members at Fort Drum and created a network advocating for trans military personnel.

=== Forced retirement ===
Following President Donald Trump's Executive Order 14183, banning transgender people from military service, Vandal became one of 32 plaintiffs in the case Talbott v. United States, challenging the Second Trump administration's ban. Vandal ultimately was forced to resign from the military under the president's executive order. Since then, Vandal has served as a board member of SPARTA Pride, a nonprofit organization supporting transgender service members and veterans.

Following her forced retirement, Vandal became the subject of the documentary film Fighting to Serve, produced by Evident Media in collaboration with PBS NewsHour. The film was nominated for a News & Documentary Emmy. As of 2026, she is a board member at SPARTA Pride.

== Personal life ==
Vandal has children and lives in Colorado Springs, Colorado.

== Filmography ==
Year	Title	Role	Notes	Ref
2025	Fighting to Serve	Herself	Documentary film	
