= Wandal =

Wandal may refer to:

== Places ==
=== India ===
- Wandal, Nidagundi, a village in Basavana Bagevadi Taluk, Bijapur district, Karnataka

=== Elsewhere ===
- Wandal, Queensland, a suburb in the Rockhampton Region, Queensland, Australia

== See also ==
- Vandal
