= Thomas S. Vandal =

American military officer

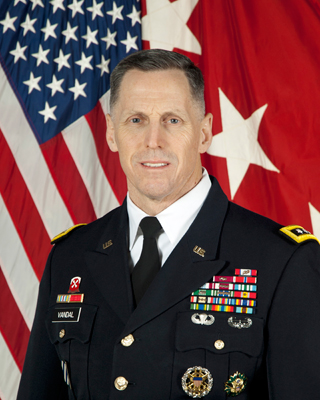
- Lt. Gen. Vandal in 2016

Personal details
- Born: January 26, 1960 Rhode Island, U.S.
- Died: October 7, 2018 (aged 58) Arlington, Virginia, U.S.
- Resting place: Arlington National Cemetery
- Spouse: Doreen Hulton
- Children: 3 (including Erica Vandal)
- Education: United States Military Academy
- Awards: Air Assault Badge; Bronze Star Medal; Defense Meritorious Service Medal; Distinguished Service Medal; Legion of Merit; Parachutist Badge

Military service
- Branch/service: United States Army
- Years of service: 1982–2018
- Rank: Lieutenant General
- Unit: Eighth Army; 2nd Infantry Division; ROK/US Combined Forces Command; 75th Field Artillery Brigade
- Battles/wars: Iraq War

Thomas S. Vandal (January 26, 1960 – October 7, 2018) was an American military officer. He was a lieutenant general in the United States Army and commanded the 2nd Infantry Division of the Eighth Army.

== Education ==
Vandal graduated from the United States Military Academy in 1982.

== Career ==
Vandal served during the Iraq War. He commanded the 2nd Infantry Division of the Eighth Army from June 2013 to April 2015. Vandal was also the director of operations, readiness, and mobilization in the Army G-3/5/7 at The Pentagon, commandant of the Army Field Artillery School and Army Fires Center of Excellence, deputy commanding general for the 3rd Infantry Division, commander of the Joint Multinational Readiness Center in Germany, and commander of the 75th Field Artillery Brigade, III Corps Artillery.

Vandal served as commanding general of the Eighth Army and chief of staff of ROK/US Combined Forces Command in South Korea from February 2016 to January 2018. He retired from the Army on September 1, 2018.

He received the Distinguished Service Medal with three bronze oak leaf clusters, the Defense Superior Medal, the Legion of Merit with two bronze oak leaf clusters, the Bronze Star Medal, the Defense Meritorious Service Medal, the Parachutist Badge, and the Air Assault Badge.

== Personal life and death ==
Vandal's children served in the United States Armed Forces as well: one son in the Navy, one son in the Marine Corps, and one daughter, Erica Vandal, in the Army.

He died on October 7, 2018 from cancer.
