= SPARTA Pride =

American nonprofit organization

SPARTA at WorldPride 2025, Washington, DC

SPARTA Pride is an American nonprofit organization representing transgender service members, veterans, their families, and allies.

Founded in 2013, it provides peer support, mentoring, grants, education, and advocacy concerning transgender military service.

The organization advocates for open transgender military service and opposes policies restricting transgender people from serving in the U.S. Armed Forces.

== Activities ==
SPARTA (Servicemembers, Partners, and Allies for Respect and Tolerance for All) was founded in 2013 by activists Allyson Robinson, Brenda Sue Fulton, and Brynn Tannehill. In January of 2014, they hosted the first conference for transgender service members in Houston. SPARTA has worked with multiple newspapers to run stories raising awareness of transgender military personnel, including the Washington Post in 2014 and the Capital Gazette in 2016.

SPARTA, in conjunction with the Human Rights Campaign, hosts the yearly Albert Cashier Awards. 2026 awardees included Paula Neira, for the Lifetime Impact Award, and Alexandria Holder, for the Courage Under Fire award.

== Leadership and members ==
In 2021, Bree Fram was elected as board chair and president of the organization. She was reelected in 2022. Emily Shilling was elected SPARTA president in 2023 Shilling stepped down in November of 2025, after which SPARTA restructured its board of directors and replaced the volunteer president position with a paid executive director position. The first and current executive director of SPARTA Pride is Kara Corcoran.
