= Hydro-Québec Building =

Office building in Montreal, Canada

Coordinates: 45°30′30″N 73°33′45″W

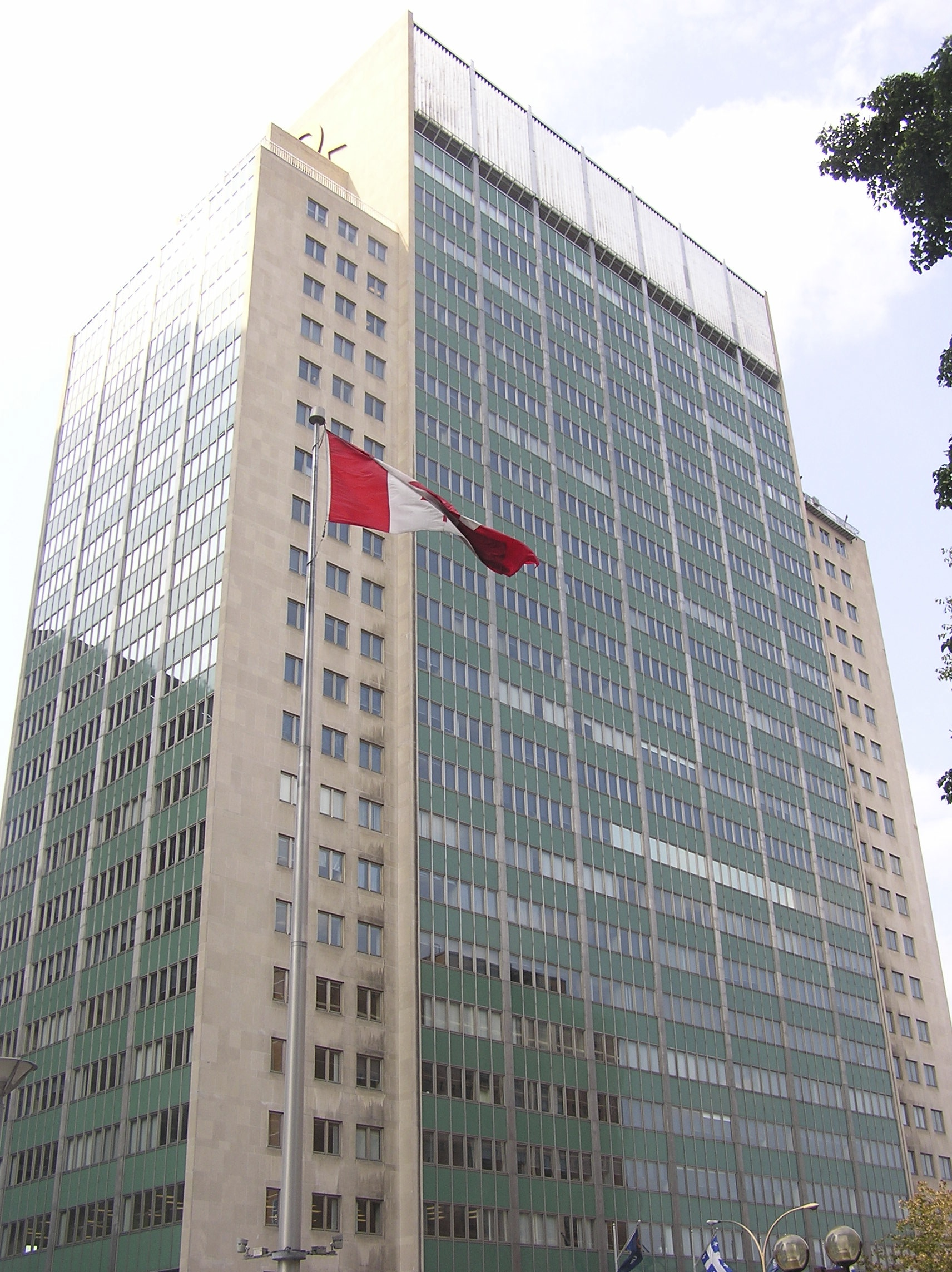
- Interactive map of the Hydro-Québec Building area

General information
- Status: Completed
- Type: Office
- Location: Montreal, Quebec, Canada, 75, boulevard René-Lévesque Ouest
- Construction started: 1959
- Completed: 1962

Height
- Height: 110 metres (360 ft)

Technical details
- Floor count: 26

Design and construction
- Architect: Gaston Gagnier

Website
- hydroquebec.com/en/

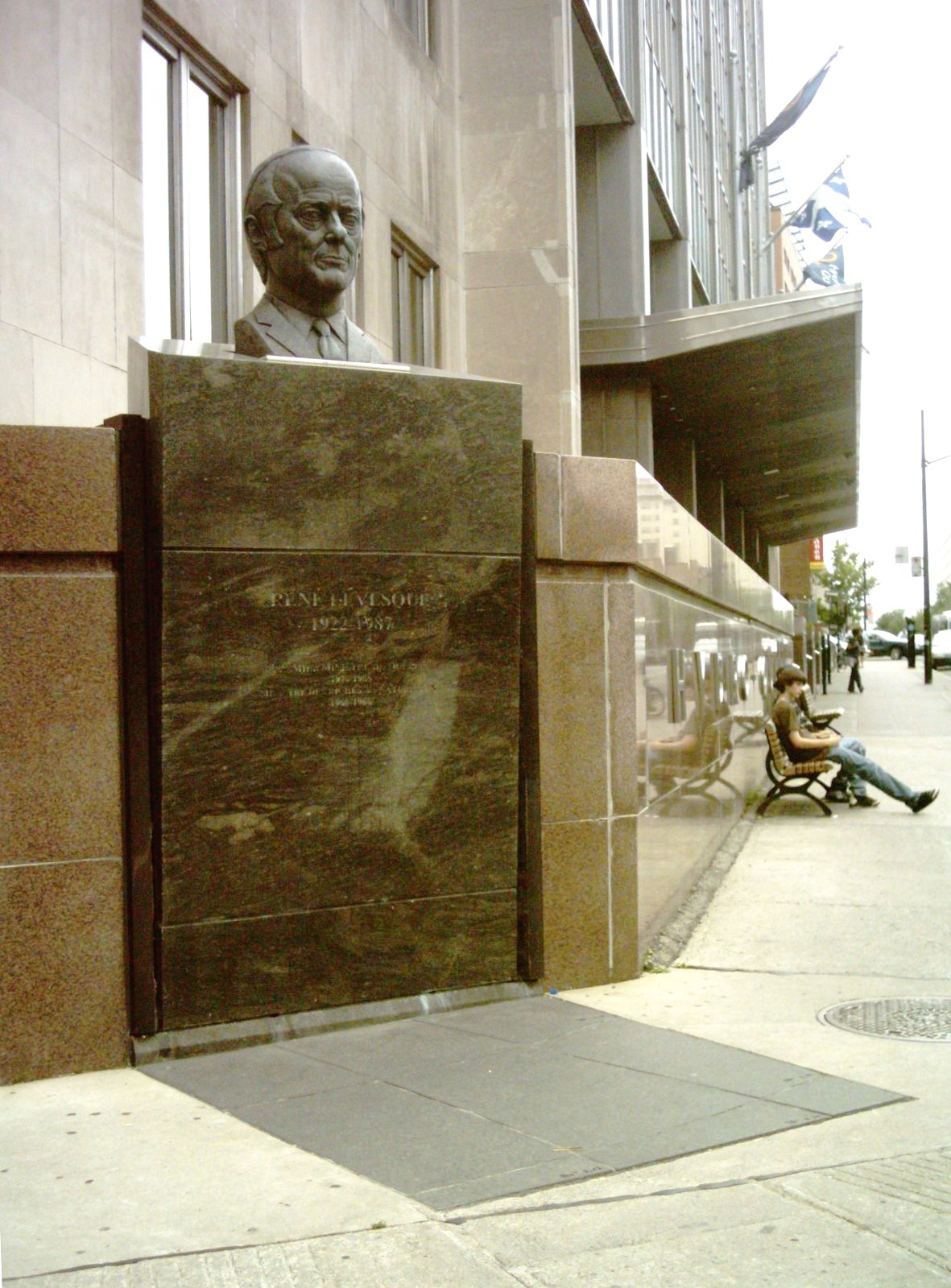
Bust of René Lévesque

The Hydro-Québec Building (French: Édifice Hydro-Québec, pronounced [edifis idʁo kebɛk]) in Montreal, Quebec, Canada stands at 110 metres (360 ft) with 27 floors. Completed in 1962, it houses the headquarters for Hydro-Québec as well the Montreal offices of the Premier of Quebec. The building was designed by Gaston Gagnier.

The building is located on René-Lévesque Boulevard, named for former premier René Lévesque, who had nationalized Quebec's hydroelectric companies in 1963 while serving as Minister of Hydroelectric Resources and Public Works in the government of Jean Lesage. A bust of Lévesque was unveiled in front of the building on August 24, 2001.
