= Thierry Vandal =

Canadian businessman

- Occupations: Hydro-Québec (President and CEO)

Thierry Vandal is a Canadian businessman. He has been the President and Chief Executive Officer of Hydro-Québec since 2005. Vandal announced in January 2015 that he was stepping down front his role and is scheduled to leave on May 1, 2015.

== Early life and education ==
Vandal holds an engineering degree from École polytechnique (Université de Montréal, 1982) and an MBA from HEC Montréal (Université de Montréal, 1995).

== Career ==
Prior to joining Hydro-Quebec in November 1996, Vandal worked for Shell Canada Limitée from 1982 to 1988 and for Société Pétrochimique Kemtec from 1988 to 1991.

While at Hydro-Quebec, Vandal served as Vice President–Strategic Planning and Business Development (1996–2001), President of Hydro-Québec Production (2001–2005) and finally President and Chief Executive Officer of Hydro-Québec (2005–2015).

== Board membership ==
He is or was the board member of the following organizations:

- Société d’énergie de la Baie James and Hydro-Québec International (Chairman of the Board)
- BioFuelNet Canada (Chairman of the Board)
- HEC Montréal
- McGill University
- Royal Bank of Canada
- TransCanada Corporation
- TC Energy

== Social involvement ==
Thierry Vandal is a member of the Board of Governors of Centraide.

== Honors ==
2012 Canadian Energy Person of the Year award by the Canadian Energy Council
