= List of protected areas of Quebec =

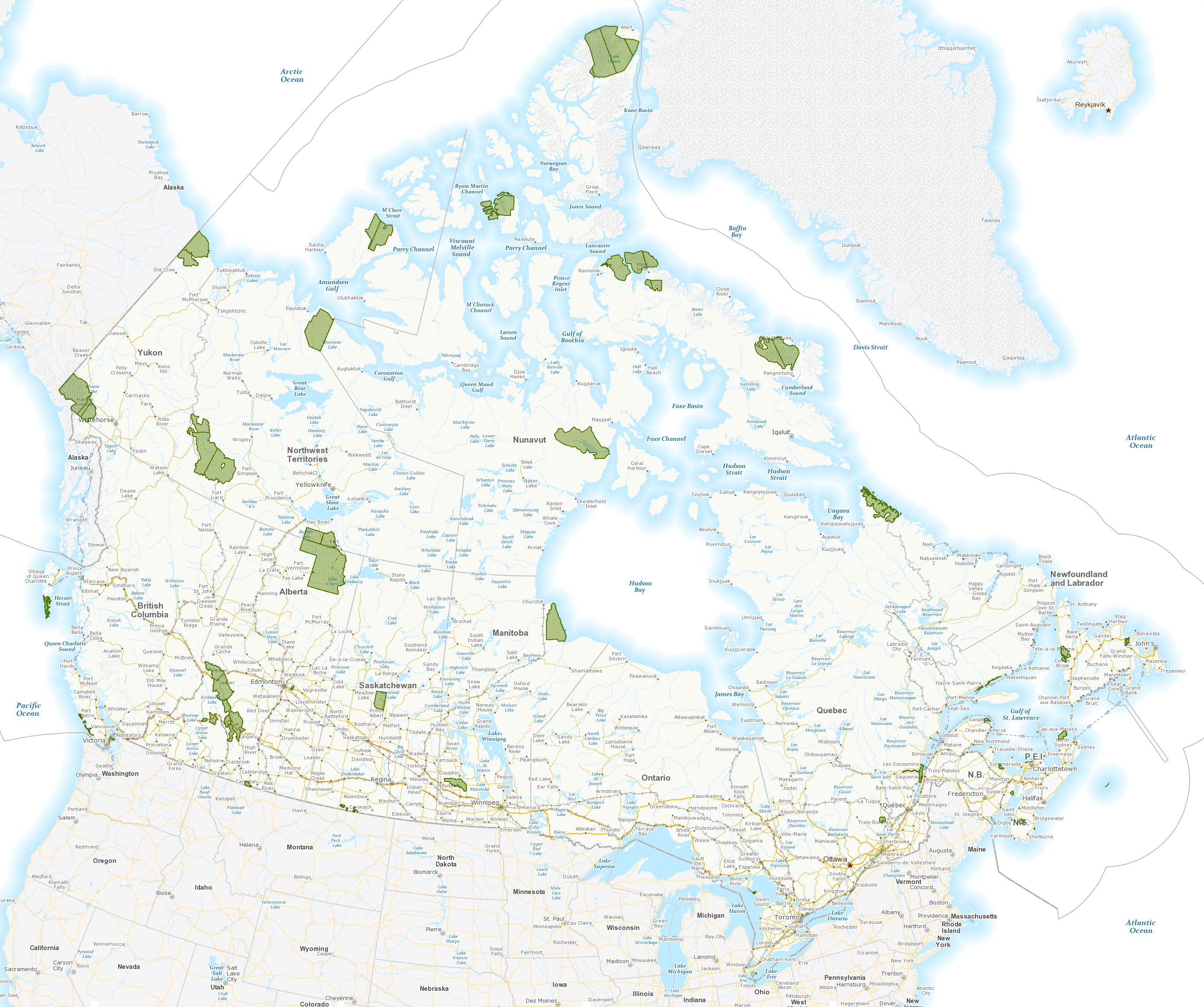
Canada's National Parks and National Reserves by provinces and territories

This list of protected areas of Quebec includes federally, provincially and municipally administered parks and wildlife reserves in Quebec, the largest province in Canada.

== National parks ==
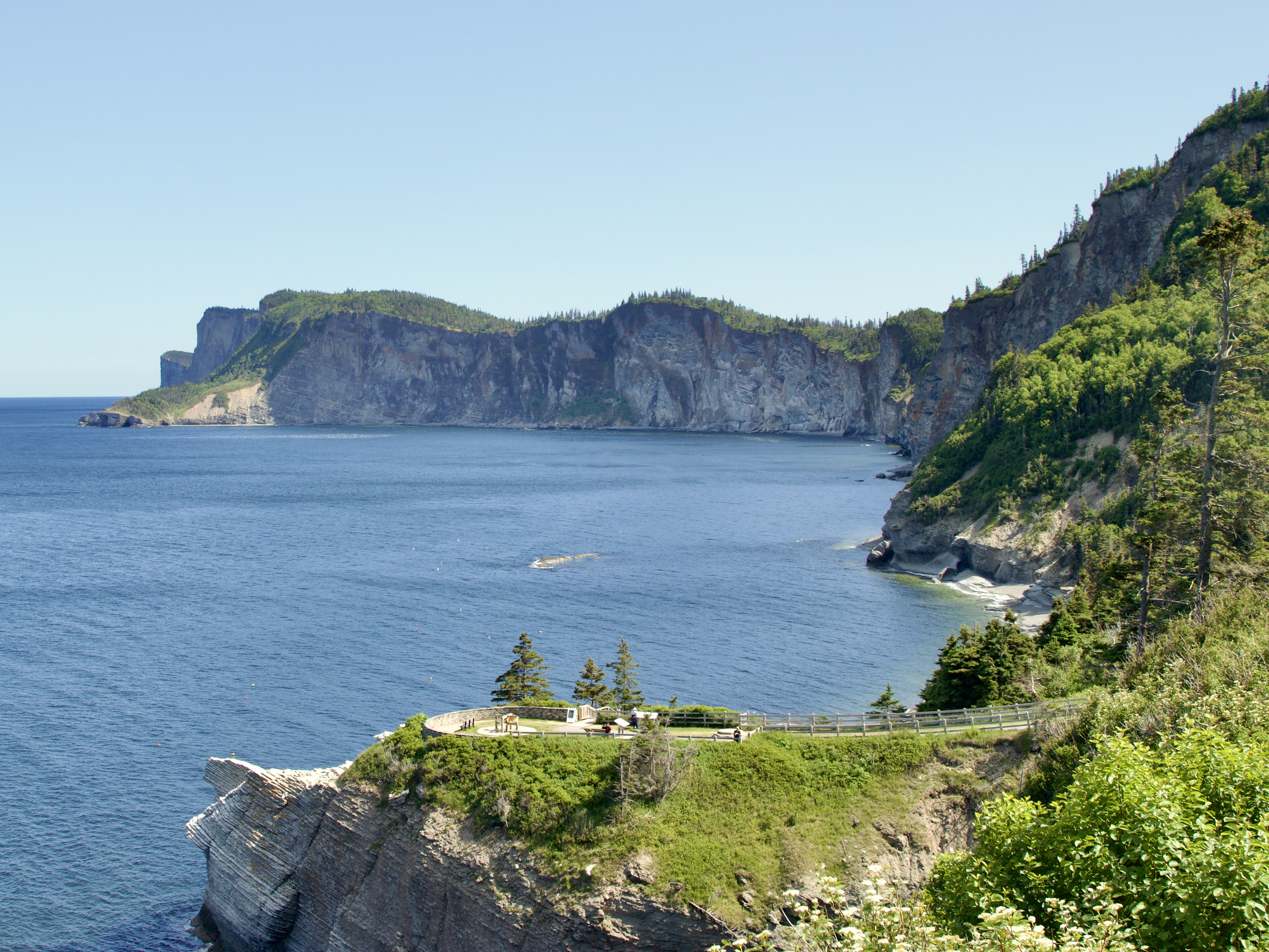
Forillon National Park, Cap Bon-Ami

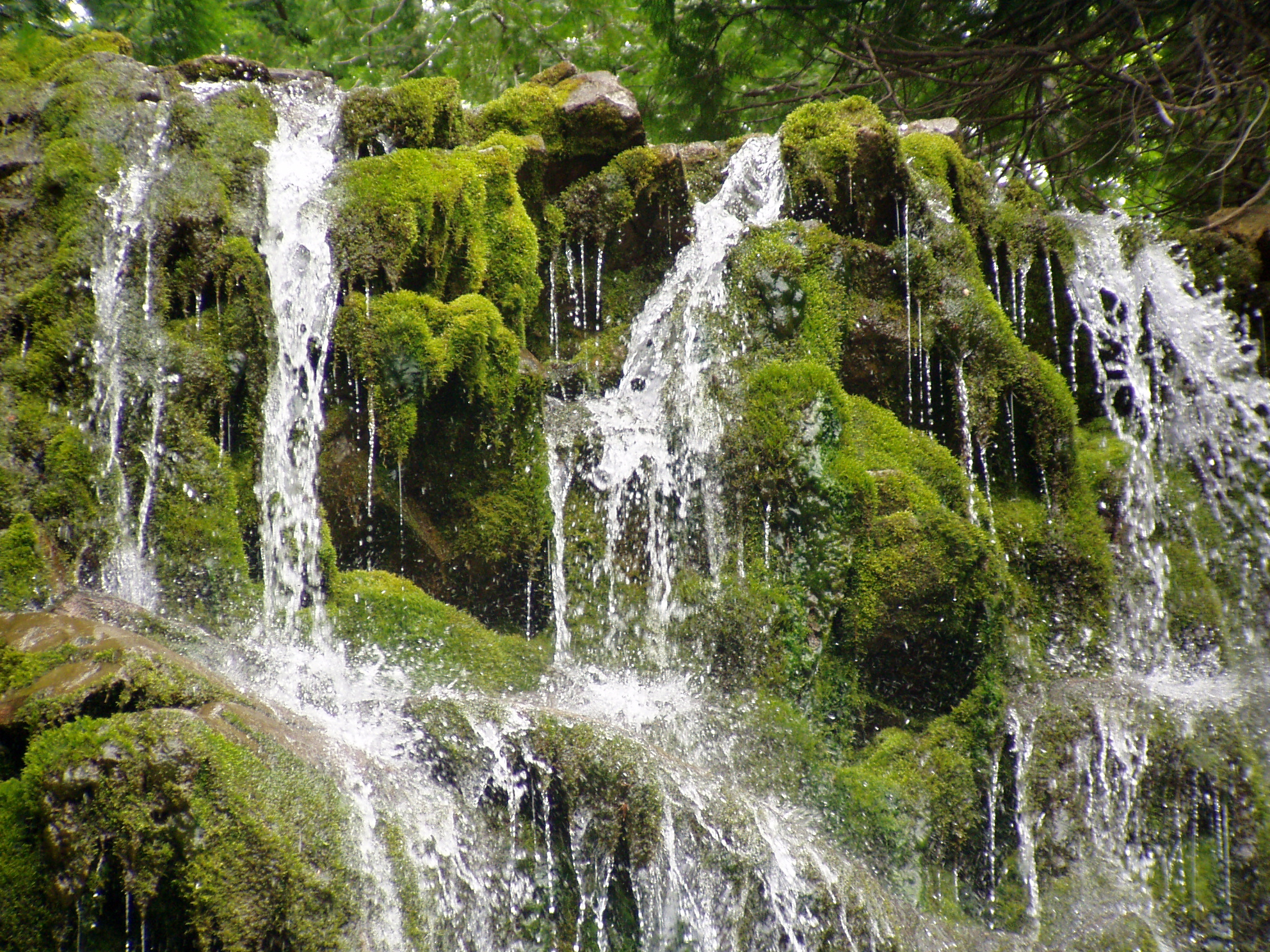
Forillon National Park, "La Chute"

Note that both federally and provincially administered parks in Quebec are labelled "parc national" (national park). Federal national parks are distinguished by the addition of "of Canada" in their official name.

=== Parks Canada ===
The following parks are managed by Parks Canada:

- Forillon National Park of Canada
- La Mauricie National Park of Canada
- Mingan Archipelago National Park Reserve of Canada
- Saguenay–St. Lawrence Marine Park, a National Marine Conservation Area (jointly with Sépaq)

=== Sépaq ===
In Quebec, provincial parks are called "national parks", and are managed by the Société des établissements de plein air du Québec, also known as Sépaq.

Name	Located in	Established	Commons category	Picture	Coordinates
Aiguebelle National Park	Rouyn-Noranda; Taschereau; Sainte-Gertrude-Manneville	1985-02-06	Parc national d'Aiguebelle		48.5104°N 78.749°W
Anticosti National Park	L'Île-d'Anticosti	2001-04-26	Parc national d’Anticosti		49.5°N 62.8333°W
Bic National Park	Rimouski; Saint-Fabien	1984-11-07	Parc national du Bic		48.35°N 68.783333°W
Frontenac National Park	Adstock; Lambton; Sainte-Praxède; Saint-Romain; Stornoway; Stratford	1987-08-06	Parc national de Frontenac		45.8667°N 71.2167°W
Gaspésie National Park	Rivière-Bonjour; Mont-Albert; Marsoui; Rivière-à-Claude	1981-11-25	Parc national de la Gaspésie		48.9333°N 66.2333°W
Grands-Jardins National Park	Lac-Pikauba	1981-11-25	Parc national des Grands-Jardins		47.6833°N 70.85°W
Hautes-Gorges-de-la-Rivière-Malbaie National Park	Mont-Élie; Lac-Pikauba; Lalemant	2000-06-28	Hautes-Gorges-de-la-Rivière-Malbaie national park		47.9333°N 70.5167°W
Île-Bonaventure-et-du-Rocher-Percé National Park	Percé	1985-02-06	Parc national de l'Île-Bonaventure-et-du-Rocher-Percé		48.496389°N 64.161944°W
Îles-de-Boucherville National Park	Boucherville	1984-09-12	Parc national des Îles-de-Boucherville		45.616667222222°N 73.466667222222°W
Jacques-Cartier National Park	Lac-Jacques-Cartier; Lac-Croche; Stoneham-et-Tewkesbury	1981-11-25	Parc national de la Jacques-Cartier		47.3333°N 71.35°W
Kuururjuaq National Park	Rivière-Koksoak	2009-05-21			58.666388888889°N 64.730555555556°W
Lac-Témiscouata National Park	Saint-Michel-du-Squatec; Saint-Juste-du-Lac; Dégelis; Témiscouata-sur-le-Lac; Saint-Cyprien	2009-11-18	Parc national du Lac-Témiscouata		47.7366°N 68.7917°W
Miguasha National Park	Nouvelle; Escuminac	1985-02-06	Miguasha National Park		48.110555555556°N 66.369444444444°W
Mont-Mégantic National Park	Val-Racine; La Patrie; Hampden	1994-06-16	Parc national du Mont-Mégantic		45.4569°N 71.1625°W
Mont-Orford National Park	Orford; Magog; Austin; Eastman	1979-08-29	Parc national du Mont-Orford		45.3333°N 72.2167°W
Mont-Saint-Bruno National Park	Saint-Bruno-de-Montarville; Sainte-Julie	1985-10-02	Parc national du Mont-Saint-Bruno		45.55°N 73.3167°W
Mont-Tremblant National Park	Val-des-Lacs; Lac-Supérieur; Mont-Tremblant; Lac-Tremblant-Nord; Labelle; Rivière-Rouge; La Macaza; Baie-des-Chaloupes; Lac-des-Dix-Milles; Saint-Donat; Saint-Guillaume-Nord; Lac-Legendre	1981-03-01	Parc national du Mont-Tremblant		46.4333°N 74.35°W
Monts-Valin National Park	Mont-Valin; Saint-David-de-Falardeau; Saint-Fulgence	1996-09-19	Parc national des Monts-Valin		48.6167°N 70.8°W
Oka National Park	Oka; Pointe-Calumet; Saint-Joseph-du-Lac	1990-06-21	Parc national d'Oka		45.468055555556°N 74.030555555556°W
Opémican National Park	Saint-Édouard-de-Fabre; Laniel; Témiscaming	2013-12-19			46.88917°N 79.10694°W
Pingualuit National Park	Rivière-Koksoak	2004-01-01	Parc national des Pingualuit		61.3°N 73.6667°W
Plaisance National Park	Papineauville; Plaisance; Lochaber; Thurso	2002-03-21	Parc national de Plaisance		45.6°N 75.1333°W
Pointe-Taillon National Park	Saint-Henri-de-Taillon; Sainte-Monique; Saint-Gédéon; Alma	1985-11-06	Parc national de la Pointe-Taillon		48.7°N 71.9667°W
Saguenay Fjord National Park	Tadoussac; Sacré-Coeur; Mont-Valin; Sainte-Rose-du-Nord; Saint-Félix-d'Otis; Rivière-Éternité; L'Anse-Saint-Jean; Petit-Saguenay; Baie-Sainte-Catherine	1983-06-15	Parc national du Fjord-du-Saguenay		48.2757°N 70.2635°W
Tursujuq National Park	Kativik Regional Government	2013-07-18	Parc national Tursujuq		56.35°N 75°W
Ulittaniujalik National Park	Kativik Regional Government	2016-03-10	Parc national Ulittaniujalik		57.626944444444°N 65.431944444444°W
Yamaska National Park	Roxton Pond; Saint-Joachim-de-Shefford	1983-07-27	Parc national de la Yamaska		45.4297°N 72.6164°W

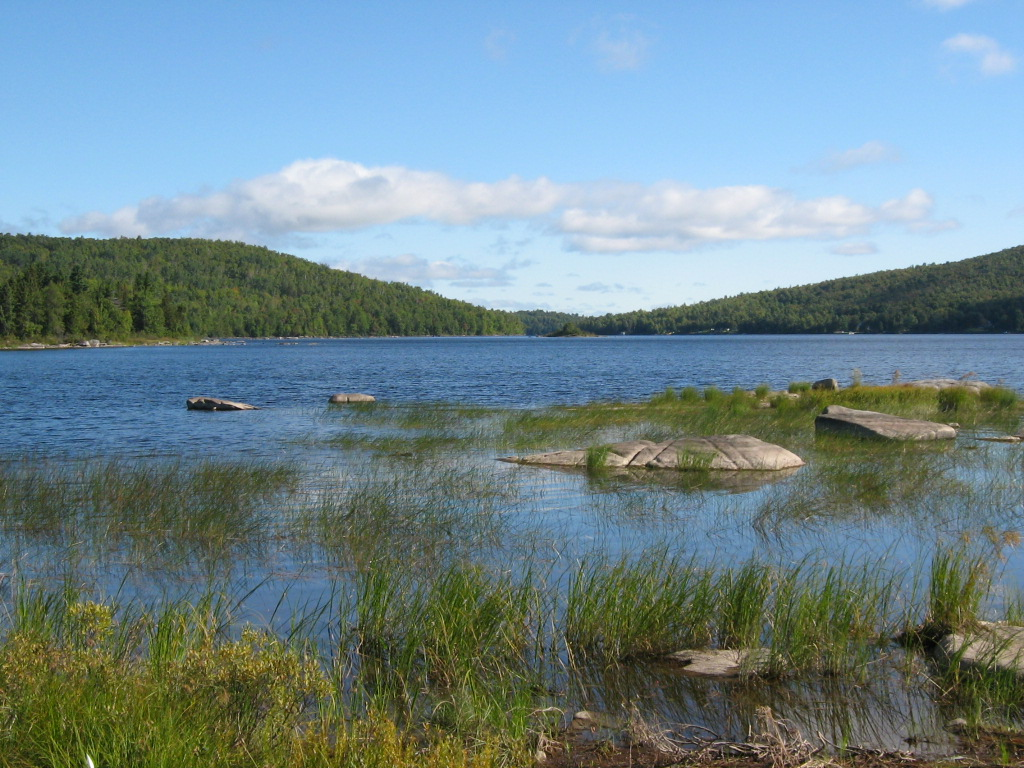
Frontenac National Park, Sauvage Bay

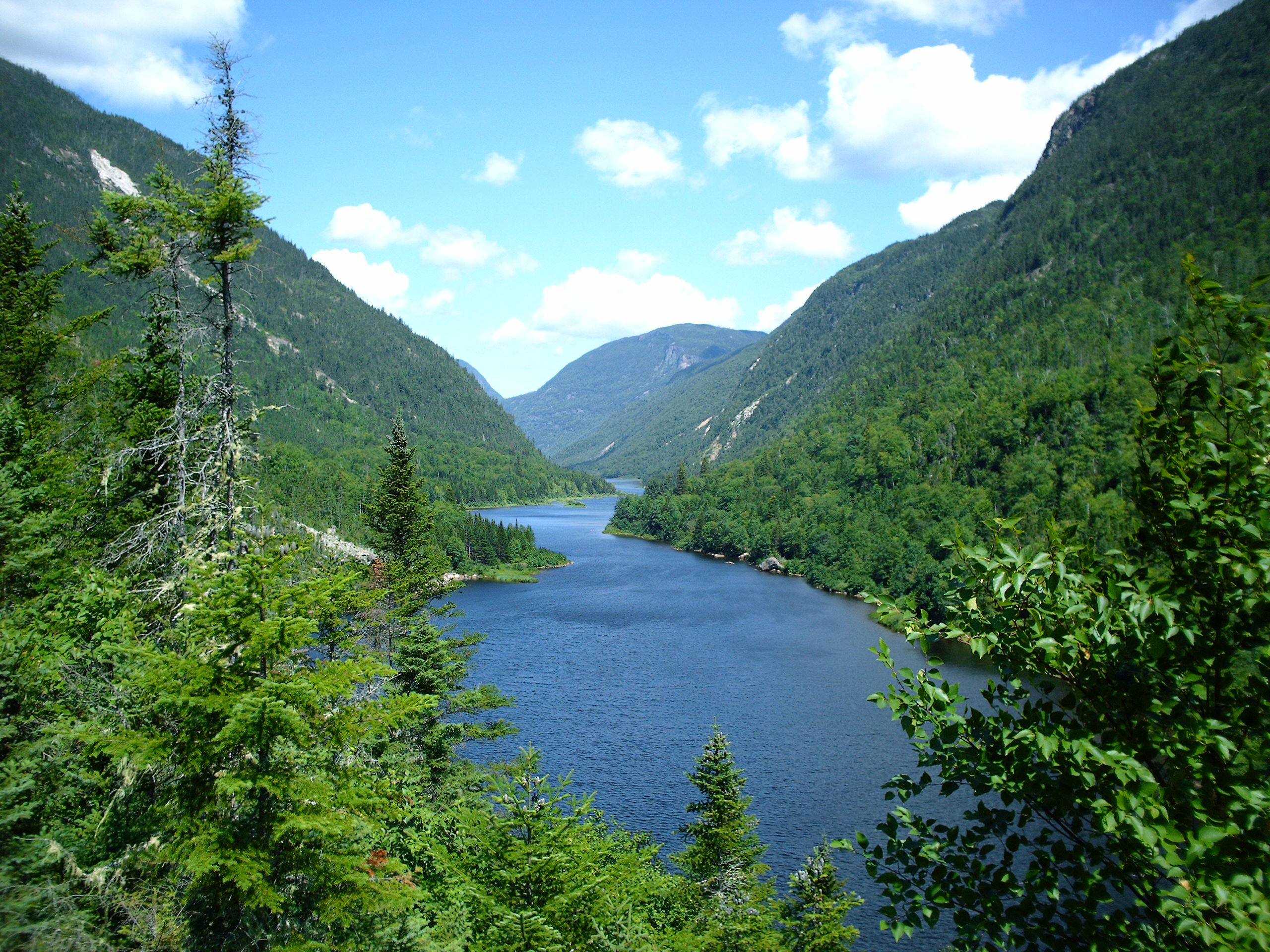
Hautes-Gorges-de-la-Rivière-Malbaie National Park, Malbaie River

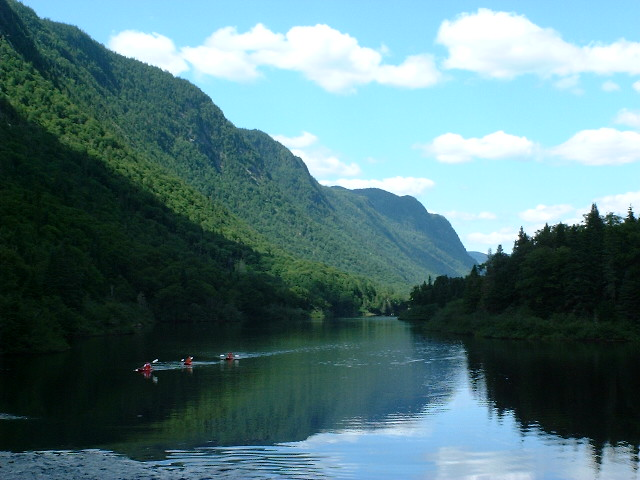
Jacques-Cartier National Park

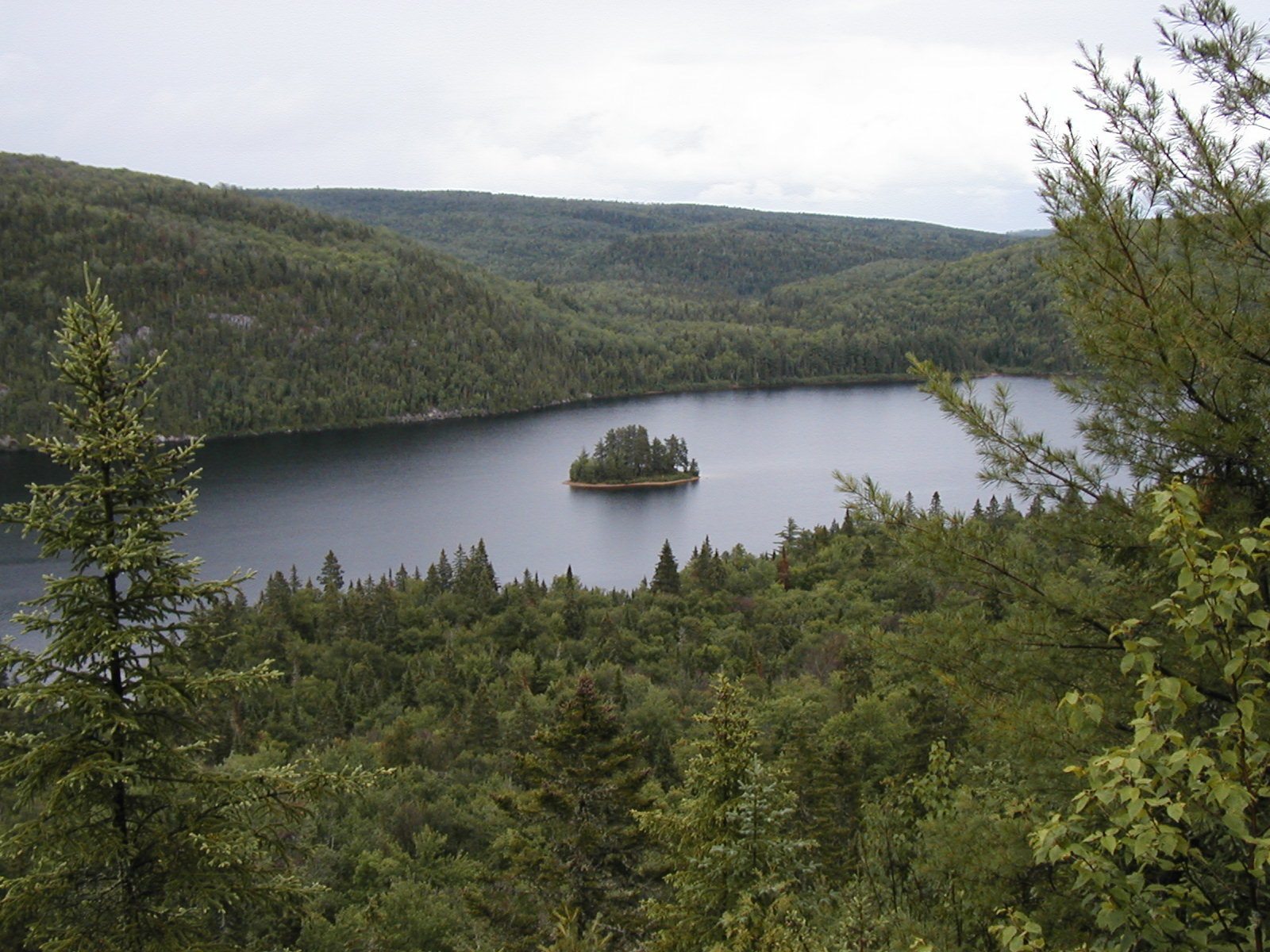
La Mauricie National Park, Île au Pins

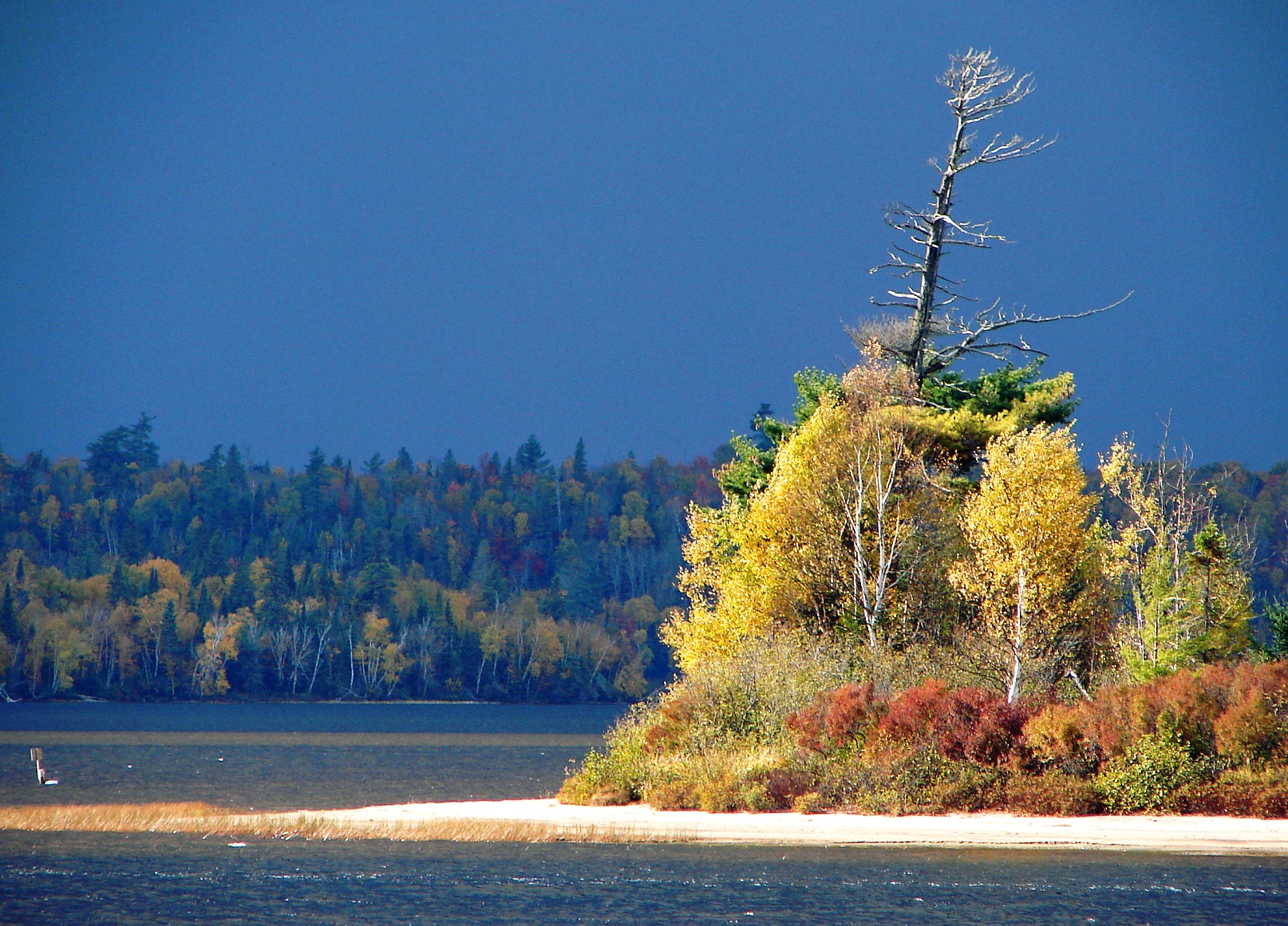
La Vérendrye Wildlife Reserve, Jean-Peré Lake

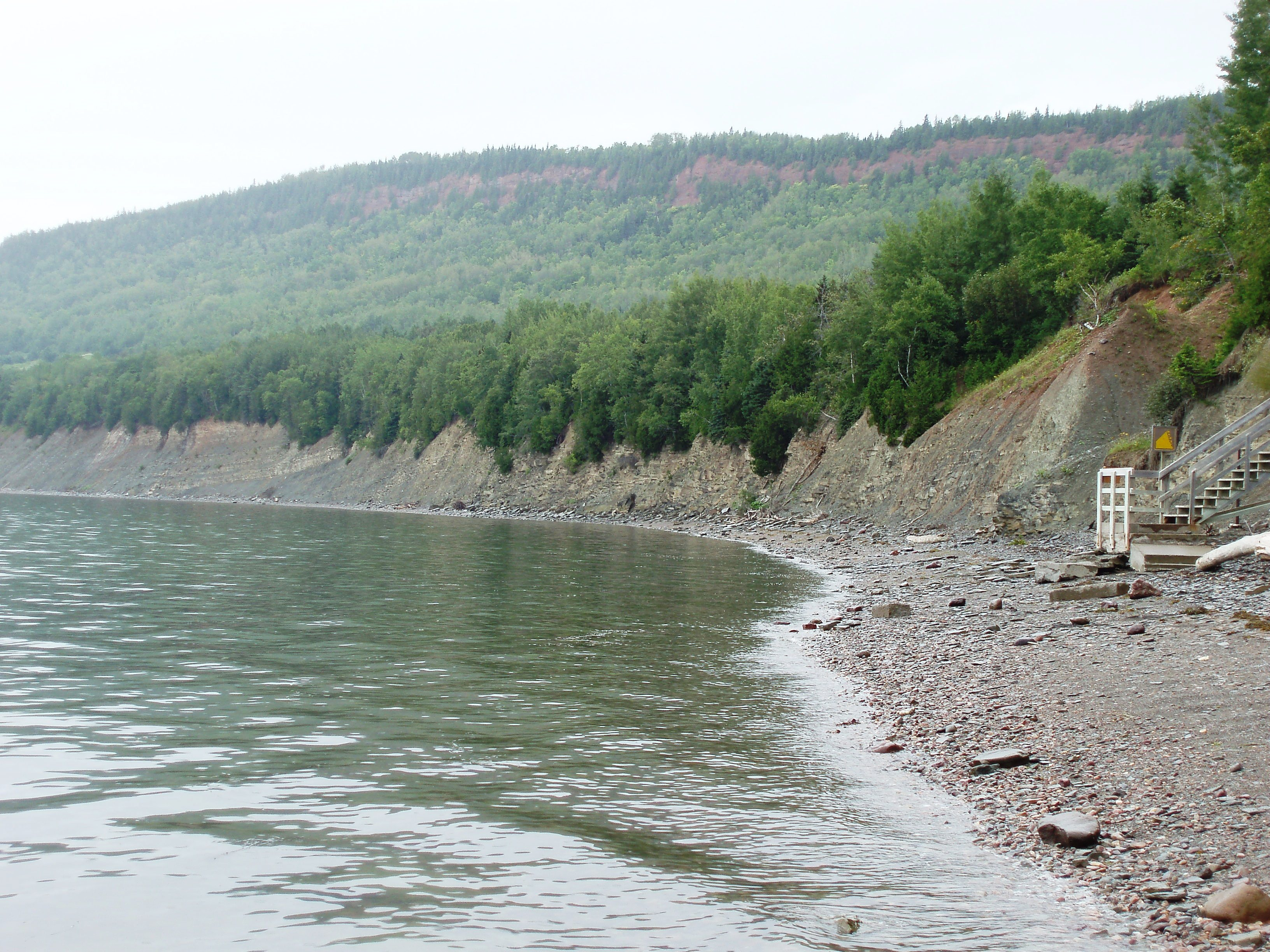
Miguasha National Park

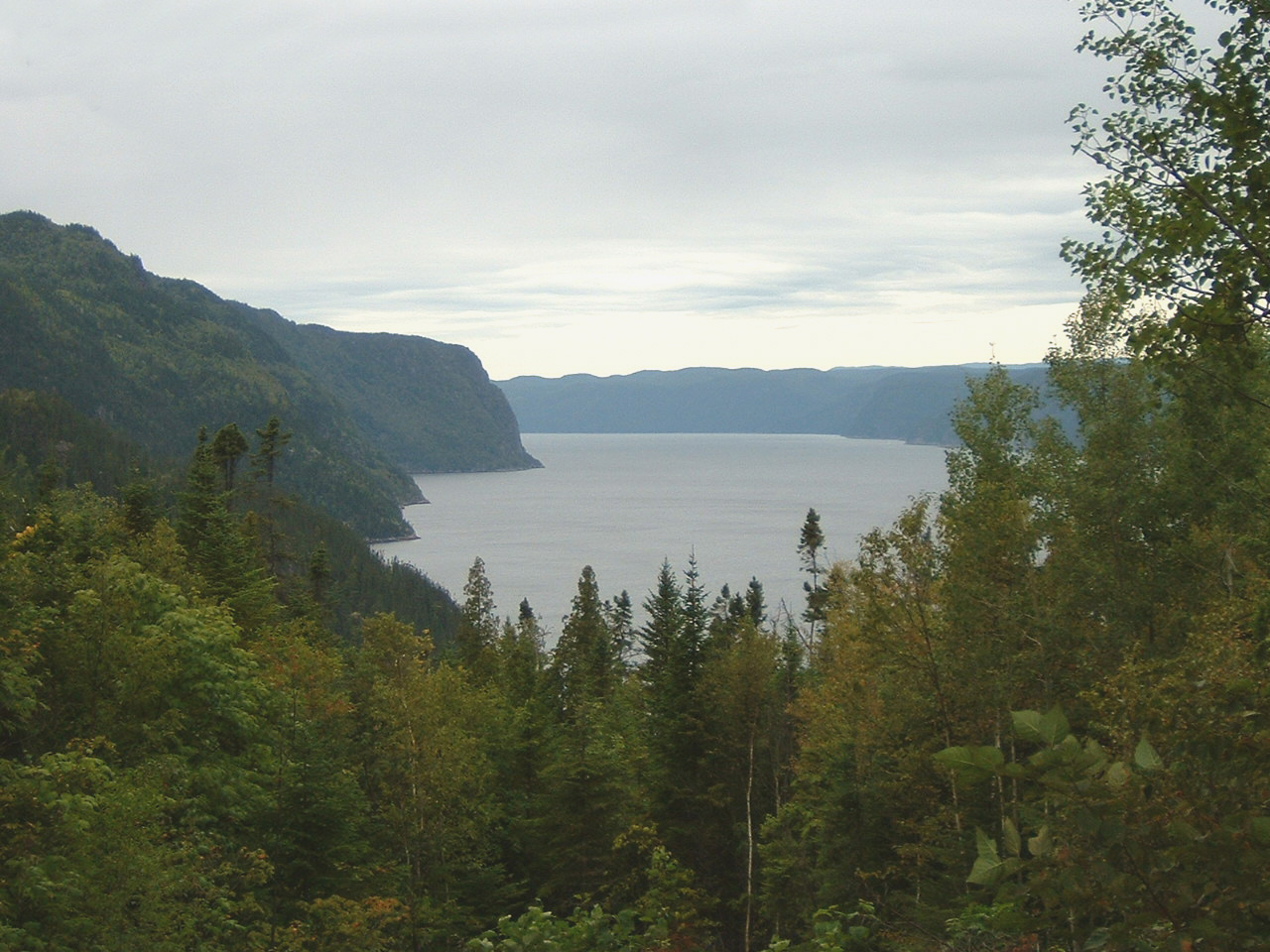
Saguenay–St. Lawrence Marine Park, Saguenay River

== Aquatic, biodiversity, and ecological reserves of Quebec ==
The ecological reserves, the biodiversity reserves, and the aquatic reserves are managed by the Ministère du Développement durable, de l’Environnement et des Parcs (Ministry of Sustainable Development, Environment and Parks) of Quebec.

Park	Location	Area (km^{2})
Aigle-à-Tête-Blanche Ecological Reserve	Rapides-des-Joachims	2.67
André-Linteau Ecological Reserve	Rapides-des-Joachims	0.91
André-Michaux Ecological Reserve	Denholm	4.50
Bog-à-Lanières Ecological Reserve	Lac-Édouard	4.30
Boisé-des-Muir Ecological Reserve	Hinchinbrooke	0.12
Caribous-de-Jourdan Ecological Reserve	Val-d'Or	7.12
Caribous-de-Val-d’Or Biodiversity Reserve	La Vallée-de-l'Or	434.2
Charles-B.-Banville Ecological Reserve	Lac-Huron	10.00
Chênaie-des-Îles-Finlay Ecological Reserve	Waltham	0.94
Chicobi Ecological Reserve	Lac-Chicobi	21.23
Claude-Mélançon Ecological Reserve	Saint-Philémon	5.35
Couchepaganiche Ecological Reserve	Métabetchouan–Lac-à-la-Croix	0.39
Dunes-de-Berry Ecological Reserve	Berry	2.59
Dunes-de-la-Moraine-d'Harricana Ecological Reserve	Rouyn-Noranda	5.40
Érablière-du-Trente-et-Un-Milles Ecological Reserve	Gracefield	6.06
Ernest-Lepage Ecological Reserve	Rivière-Bonaventure	8.10
Estuaire-de-la-Rivière-Bonaventure Aquatic Reserve	Bonaventure	1.8
Fernald Ecological Reserve	Rivière-Bonjour	7.35
Forêt-la-Blanche Ecological Reserve	Mayo	20.52
G.-Oscar-Villeneuve Ecological Reserve	Mont-Valin	5.67
Grande-Rivière Ecological Reserve	Mont-Alexandre	173.00
Grand-Lac-Salé Ecological Reserve	L'Île-d'Anticosti	23.39
Grands-Ormes Ecological Reserve	Mont-Élie	9.20
Île-Brion Ecological Reserve	Grosse-Île	6.50
Île-Garth Ecological Reserve	Bois-des-Filion	0.17
Îles-Avelle-Wight-et-Hiam Ecological Reserve	Vaudreuil-Dorion	0.90
Irénée-Marie Ecological Reserve	Rivière-de-la-Savane	1.89
Irène-Fournier Ecological Reserve	Rivière-Bonjour	4.40
Jackrabbit Ecological Reserve	Montcalm	7.50
James-Little Ecological Reserve	Sheenboro	2.04
J.-Clovis-Laflamme Ecological Reserve	Lac-Ashuapmushuan	10.15
Judith-De Brésoles Ecological Reserve	Lac-Édouard	10.90
Jules-Carpentier Ecological Reserve	Pont-Rouge	0.05
Karst-de-Saint-Elzéar Biodiversity Reserve	Bonaventure	44.27
Kettles-de-Berry Ecological Reserve	Berry	2.67
Lac-à-la-Tortue Ecological Reserve	Shawinigan	5.66
Lac-Malakisis Ecological Reserve	Les Lacs-du-Témiscamingue	30.27
Lacs-Vaudray-et-Joannès Biodiversity Reserve	Rouyn-Noranda	193.07
Léon-Provancher Ecological Reserve	Bécancour	4.84
Lionel-Cinq-Mars Ecological Reserve	Saint-Édouard-de-Lotbinière	4.40
Louis-Babel Ecological Reserve	Rivière-aux-Outardes	235.40
Louis-Ovide-Brunet Ecological Reserve	Lac-Bouchette	6.69
Louis-Zéphirin-Rousseau Ecological Reserve	Notre-Dame-de-Pontmain	0.05
Manche-d'Épée Ecological Reserve	Sainte-Madeleine-de-la-Rivière-Madeleine	5.73
Marcel-Léger Ecological Reserve	Trois-Rivières	0.36
Marcelle-Gauvreau Ecological Reserve	Mont-Valin	1.14
Marcel-Raymond Ecological Reserve	Henryville	0.64
Marie-Jean-Eudes Ecological Reserve	Saint-Alexis-des-Monts	8.45
Matamec Ecological Reserve	Sept-Îles	186.00
Météorite Biodiversity Reserve	Manicouagan	233.00
Micocoulier Ecological Reserve	Coteau-du-Lac	0.29
Mine-aux-Pipistrelles Ecological Reserve	Potton	0.03
Montmorency Falls	between Beauport, and Boischatel	
Mont-Saint-Pierre Ecological Reserve	Mont-Saint-Pierre	6.43
Père-Louis-Marie Ecological Reserve	Bouchette	3.15
Pin-Rigide Ecological Reserve	Franklin	0.66
Pointe-Heath Ecological Reserve	L'Île-d'Anticosti	18.69
Pointe-Platon Ecological Reserve	Sainte-Croix	0.59
Presqu'île-Robillard Ecological Reserve	Saint-André-d'Argenteuil	0.84
Ristigouche Ecological Reserve	Ristigouche-Sud-Est	4.68
Rivière-aux-Brochets Ecological Reserve	Saint-Armand	1.26
Rivière-du-Moulin Ecological Reserve	Lotbinière	0.11
Rivière-Rouge Ecological Reserve	Grenville-sur-la-Rouge	3.13
Rolland-Germain Ecological Reserve	Montcerf-Lytton	13.70
Ruisseau-de-l'Indien Ecological Reserve	Sheenboro	3.24
Saguenay–St. Lawrence Marine Park	Rivière-Éternité	1138.00
Samuel-Brisson Ecological Reserve	Hampden	7.90
Serpentine-de-Coleraine Ecological Reserve	Saint-Joseph-de-Coleraine	3.97
Tantaré Ecological Reserve	Saint-Gabriel-de-Valcartier	14.50
Tapani Ecological Reserve	Sainte-Anne-du-Lac	0.17
Thomas-Fortin Ecological Reserve	Lac-Pikauba	1.18
Thomas-Sterry-Hunt International Ecological Reserve	Saint-Just-de-Bretenières	0.56
Tourbières-de-Lanoraie Ecological Reserve	Lanoraie	4.15
Uapishka Biodiversity Reserve	Manicouagan	1,382.00
Vallée-du-Ruiter Ecological Reserve	Potton	1.17
Victor-A.-Huard Ecological Reserve	Lac-Ministuk	0.20
Vieux-Arbres Ecological Reserve	Duparquet	0.04
William-Baldwin Ecological Reserve	Berry	291.38

== Zone d'exploitation contrôlée ==
In Quebec, the 86 "zone d'exploitation contrôlée" (controlled harvesting zone) (ZEC) are managed by non profit corporation. This category of protected areas is subdivided by "Zec of rivers" (mainly for fishing mission) and "Zec of lands".

== Regional parks ==
- Parc régional Boréal (Manicouagan);

- Parc régional des Trois-Sœurs (La Tuque);

- Parc régional du Marécage-des-Scots (Le Haut-Saint-François);

- Parc régional Obalski (Chibougamau).
- Parc régional de la Rivière Gentilly
- Parc régional des Appalaches (Montmagny)
- Parc régional des Grandes-Coulées (L'Érable)
- Des Grèves Regional Park
- Parc régional du Massif-du-Sud (Bellechasse, Les Etchemins)
- Parc régional du Mont-Ham (Les Sources)
- Parc régional du Mont-Saint-Joseph
- Parc régional du Poisson-Blanc (Antoine-Labelle)
- Parc régional éducatif du Bois de Belle-Rivière
- Parc régional du réservoir Kiamika (Antoine-Labelle);
- Parc régional de la Montagne-du-Diable (Antoine-Labelle)
- Parc régional Val-David -Val-Morin
- Vallée Bras du Nord
- Base de plein air Ste-Foy
- Centre de la Côte Boisée & Les Sentiers de l'Estrie
- TERFA secteur Le Canyon des Portes de l'Enfer
- Parc Aventures Cap Jaseux
- Parc de la Rivière Batiscan
- Parc de Gros Cap
- Parc de la gorge Coaticook – Parc Découverte nature
- Parc de la Rivière-des-Mille-Iles
- Parc d’escalade et de randonnée de la Montagne d’Argent
- Parc linéaire le P'tit train du Nord
- Parc naturel régional de Portneuf (Portneuf)
- Parc régional de Beauharnois-Salaberry
- Parc régional de la Rivière-du-Nord
- Parc régional de la Forêt Drummond
- Parc régional de la rivière Mitis
- Parc régional de la Seigneurie-du-lac-Matapédia (La Matapédia)
- Parc Régional des Chutes Monte-à-Peine-et-des-Dalles
- Parc régional des Grandes-Rivières du Lac Saint-Jean
- Parc régional du Lac 31 Milles
- Parc régional Saint-Bernard

=== Lanaudière ===
Regional parks in Lanaudière

- Parc régional de la Forêt Ouareau (Matawinie)
- Parc régional des Sept-Chutes (Matawinie)
- Parc régional du Lac-Taureau (Matawinie)
- Parc régional de la Chute-à-Bull (Matawinie);

== Other parks ==
- Gatineau Park is federal park located near the city of Gatineau, just north of Ottawa, Ontario. It is not part of the national park system of Canada and is administered by the federal National Capital Commission.
- Canal de l'Aqueduc
- Cap-Saint-Jacques Nature Park
- Champ de Mars
- Dorchester Square
- Île de la Visitation
- Île Notre-Dame
- Jacques Cartier Park
- James-Darby Park
- Jarry Park
- Lac Beauchamp Park
- Maisonneuve Park
- Montreal Archipelago Ecological Park
- Morgan Arboretum
- Mount Royal Park
- Oxford Park
- Parc Aquarium du Québec
- Parc du Mont-Comi
- Parc écologique des Sansonnets
- Parc Jean-Drapeau
- Parc Lafontaine
- Place Émilie-Gamelin
- Plains of Abraham
- Saint Helen's Island

== See also ==
- Canyon Sainte-Anne
- Cap Tourmente National Wildlife Area
- List of National Parks of Canada
- List of Canadian provincial parks
