= Protected areas of Quebec =

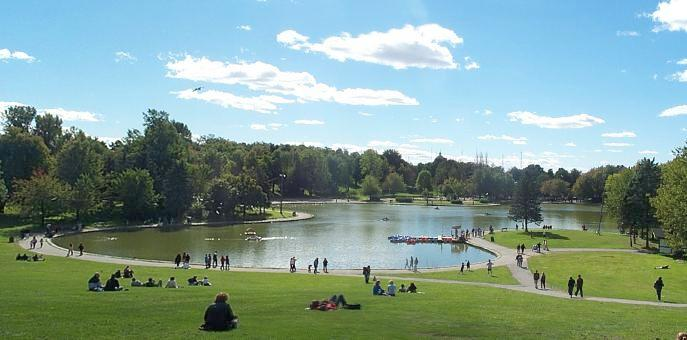
Lac aux Castors in Mount Royal Park in Montreal

A Protected area of Quebec is defined as "a territory, in a terrestrial or aquatic environment, geographically delimited, whose legal framework and administration aim specifically to ensure the protection and maintenance of biological diversity and of associated natural and cultural resources". As of November 11, 2013, protected areas covered 152,371.60 square kilometres (58,831.00 sq mi), or 9.14% of the province of Quebec, Canada.

Quebec has about twenty legal designations and more than 2,500 sites designated as protected areas.

== History ==
The first protected area was Parc du Mont-Royal in 1876 followed by parc de la Montagne-Tremblante in 1894.

In 1977, the National Assembly of Quebec adopted the Parks Act. This law assigns provincial parks (referred to as national parks) functions of recreation and conservation.

In 2002, the National Assembly of Quebec adopted the Natural Heritage Conservation Act.

In 2020, the Government of Quebec reached the Aichi Target of protecting at least 17% of terrestrial and inland water areas and 10% of marine and coastal areas by the end of 2020.

In 2024, the Government of Quebec published the Nature Plan, a roadmap aimed at protecting 30% of the territory by 2030 and contributing to the achievement of the 23 targets of the Kunming-Montreal Global Biodiversity Framework.

== Federal level ==
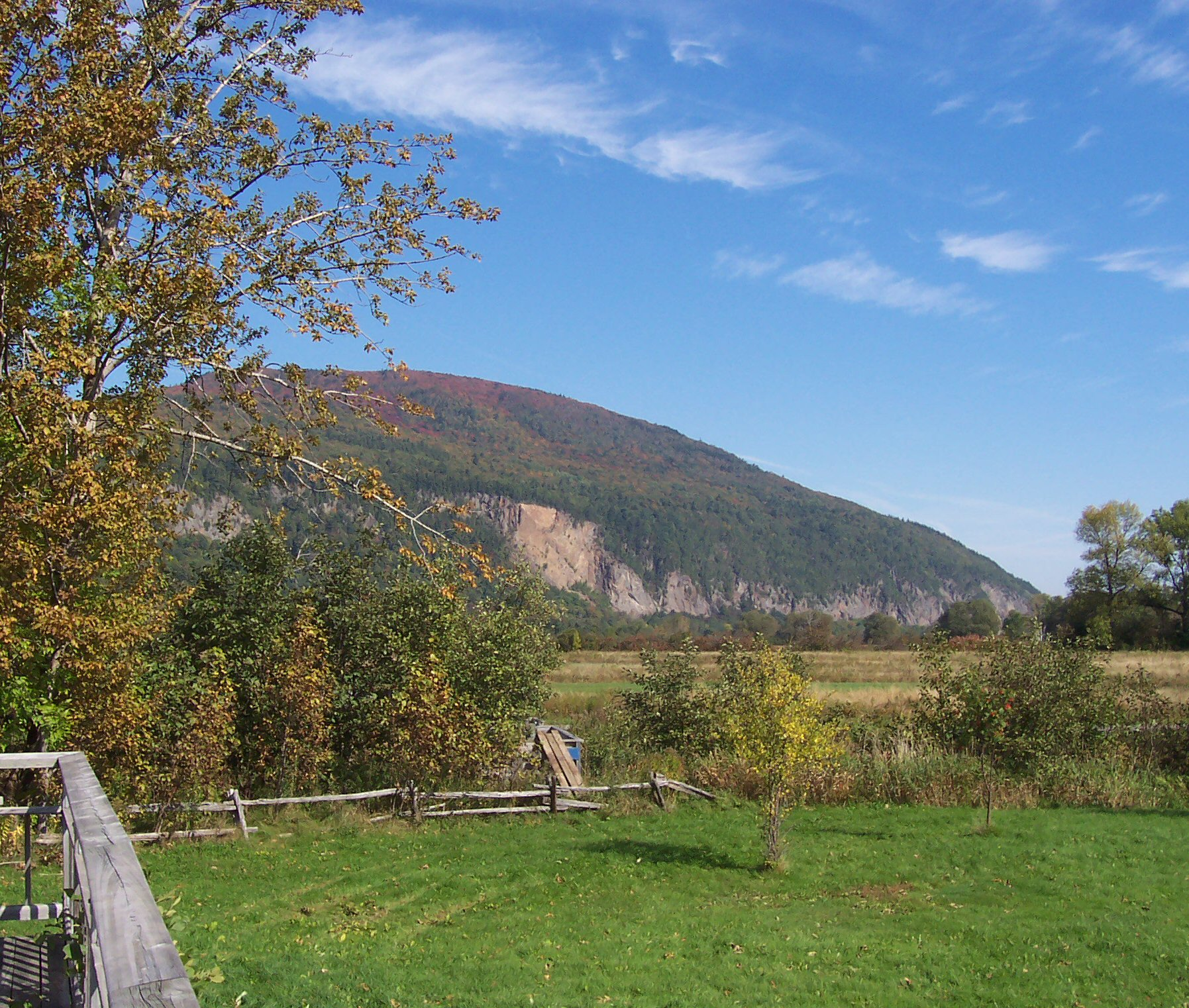
Cap Tourmente National Wildlife Area

Canada has five types of protections divided into two departments.

- The Environment and Climate Change Canada, through the agency Parks Canada, has two national parks (Forillon National Park and La Mauricie National Park 781 square kilometres (302 sq mi)) and a national park reserve (Mingan Archipelago National Park Reserve 150 square kilometres (58 sq mi)).

The agency is also responsible for a national marine conservation area: the Saguenay–St. Lawrence Marine Park (1,246 square kilometres (481 sq mi)), which is co-managed with the Ministry of Sustainable Development, Environment, and Fight Against Climate Change.

Also the national historic site of Grosse-Île-et-le-Mémorial-des-Irlandais (2 square kilometres (0.77 sq mi)) is also considered a protected area.

Through the Canadian Wildlife Service, which is managed by the same department, it administers eight National Wildlife Area (58 square kilometres (22 sq mi)) and twenty-seven migratory bird sanctuaries (518 square kilometres (200 sq mi)).

- Finally, the National Capital Commission (Canada), which belongs to the Minister of Transport, Infrastructure and Communities, protects Gatineau Park and Lac-Leamy park (364 square kilometres (141 sq mi)).

== Provincial level ==
=== Ministry of Sustainable Development, Environment and Parks ===
==== Floristic habitat ====
Under the Endangered or Vulnerable Species Act, the ministry can also designate a plant habitat to protect a threatened or vulnerable plant. The fifty flora habitats cover 51 square kilometres (20 sq mi).

==== National parks ====
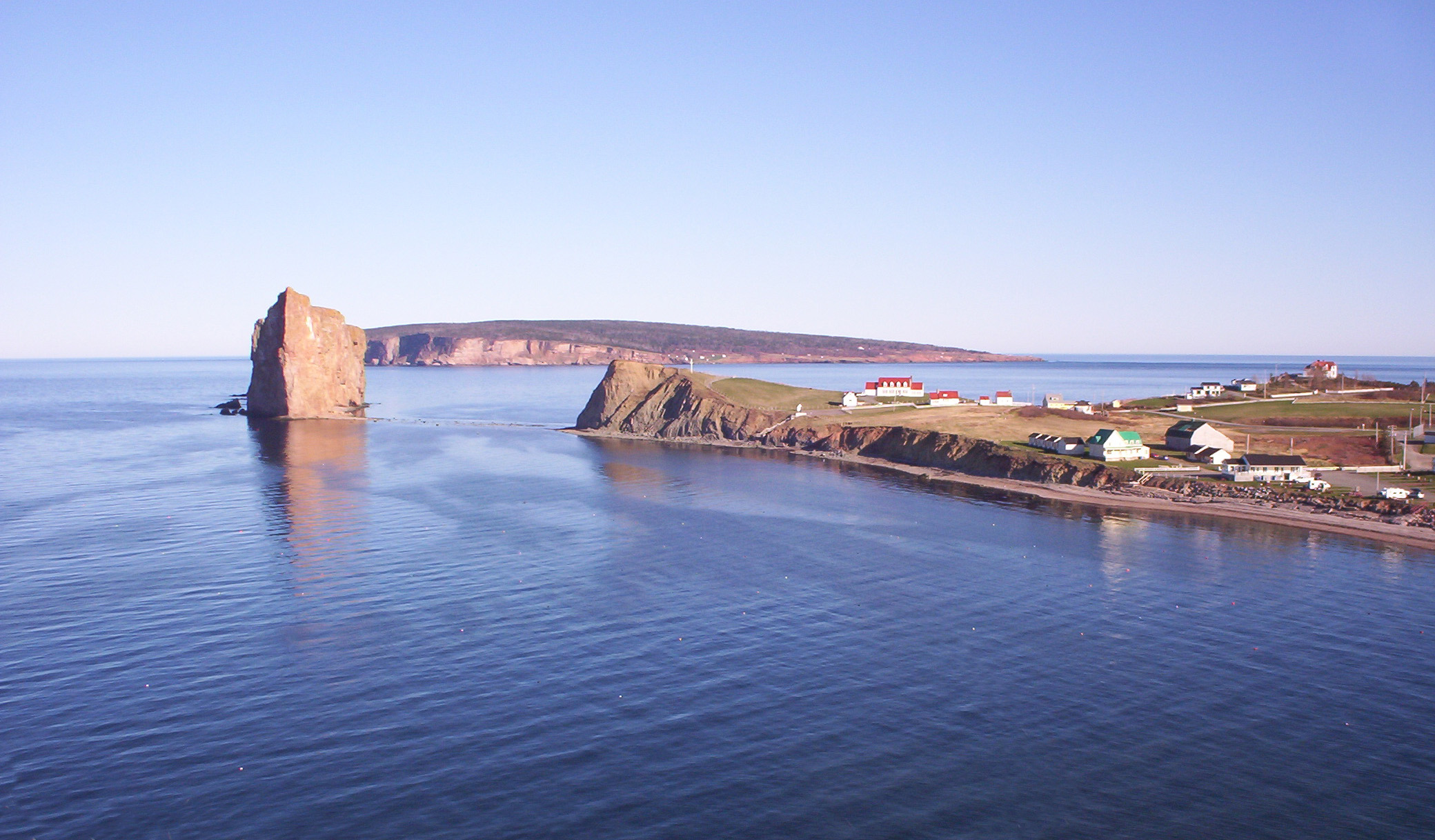
Île-Bonaventure-et-du-Rocher-Percé National Park

The twenty-four national parks of Quebec, which protect 11,077.22 square kilometres (4,276.94 sq mi) of territory, are protected areas intended to protect territories representative of the natural regions of Quebec or sites of exceptional character. Its territories are also open to the public for educational and intensive recreational purposes.

The province also has six national park reserves in Nunavik which protect 26,831 square kilometres (10,360 sq mi). Although their legal status is lower, it offers a level of protection similar to that of national parks.

==== Aquatic reserves ====
Aquatic reserves are areas similar to biodiversity reserves; these areas aim to protect hydrographic basins and marine environments that have little or no modification by man. The first aquatic reserve, the estuaire-de-la-Rivière-Bonaventure aquatic reserve was created in 2009 (1.8 square kilometres (0.69 sq mi)). Eight other reserves are currently planned.

==== Biodiversity reserves ====
There are five biodiversity reserves in Quebec which protect 2,286 square kilometres (883 sq mi) of territory. This type of zone aims to maintain biodiversity in the various natural regions of Quebec. Seventy-six new biodiversity reserves are planned in Quebec and will cover an area of 58,419 square kilometres (22,556 sq mi).

==== Ecological reserves ====
Ecological reserves, which number 70, protect 949 square kilometres (366 sq mi) of territory. These are territories primarily devoted to conservation, education and research. Most of these protected areas, which are small in size, protect distinctive environments, such as a swamp, forest, or watershed. Most of the ecological reserves are closed to the public, with the exception of three, namely the ecological reserves of Forêt-la-Blanche, Serpentine-de-Coleraine and Tourbières-de-Lanoraie. This is the highest level of protection offered by the province.

=== Ministry of Natural Resources and Wildlife ===
==== Exceptional forest ecosystems ====
Exceptional forest ecosystems are territories designated by the Ministry of Natural Resources and Fauna which protect various forest environments. These territories are protected, on public lands, by virtue of the "forest law". There are three types of exceptional forest ecosystems: "Old-growth forests" (92 sites, 223 kilometres (138.57 mi)), the "rare forests" (35 sites, 28 square kilometres (11 sq mi)), and the "refuge forests" (18 sites, 18 square kilometres (6.9 sq mi)). On private land, owners must be informed of these sites and show an interest in voluntary conservation measures so that these exceptional forest ecosystems are protected.

==== Wildlife habitat ====
A wildlife habitat is a territory offering various species an environment necessary for the basic needs in terms of shelter, reproduction and food, of the 11 types of wildlife habitats, seven are recognized as protected areas: the "concentration areas of aquatic birds" (735 sites, 3,876 square kilometres (1,497 sq mi)), the "containment areas of the white-tailed deer" (114 sites, 2,526 square kilometres (975 sq mi)), the "habitats d’une espèce faunique menacée ou vulnérable" (habitats of threatened or vulnerable wildlife species) (two sites, 653 square kilometres (252 sq mi)), the "bird colonies" (133 sites, 8 kilometres (4.97 mi)), the "muskrat habitats'" (173 sites, 136 kilometres (84.51 mi)), the "heronries" (99 sites, 30 square kilometres (12 sq mi)), and the "mud flats" (32 sites, 1 square kilometre (0.39 sq mi)).

==== Wildlife refuges ====
Wildlife refuges serve to protect wildlife habitats of national or regional importance or the habitat of species designated as threatened or vulnerable. There are currently 11 wildlife refuges protecting 23 square kilometres (8.9 sq mi).

== Municipal or non-governmental level ==
=== Natural environment of voluntary conservation ===
Voluntary conservation (Private Stewardship) is an approach that allows the owner to commit to the preservation of the natural heritage of his property through a non-governmental approach.

It is a community approach to conservation. Conservation organizations (land trust) are non-profit, non-governmental organizations whose mission is the conservation of nature. These organizations were set up across Quebec, Canada, and around the world, by citizens who take the initiative to preserve the natural elements that are close to their hearts. Thus, conservation organizations assist owners who want to ensure that their land is protected for generations to come, they reconcile conservation and land use, they protect and enhance their properties through extensive and educational activities, they promote an integrated approach to land use planning.

On private land, this approach is the most promising for guaranteeing the preservation of biodiversity. Donations, conservation easements or acquisitions for conservation purposes ensure the conservation of sites in perpetuity and provide certain tax advantages for the landowner who undertakes to do so.

In Quebec, the Network of Protected Natural Environments brings together owners and managers who work for the conservation of natural heritage across Quebec. It plays a unique role in consolidating a network of partners and encouraging the sharing of conservation know-how as well as promoting the preservation of nature through voluntary conservation on private land.

=== Nature reserves in a private environment ===
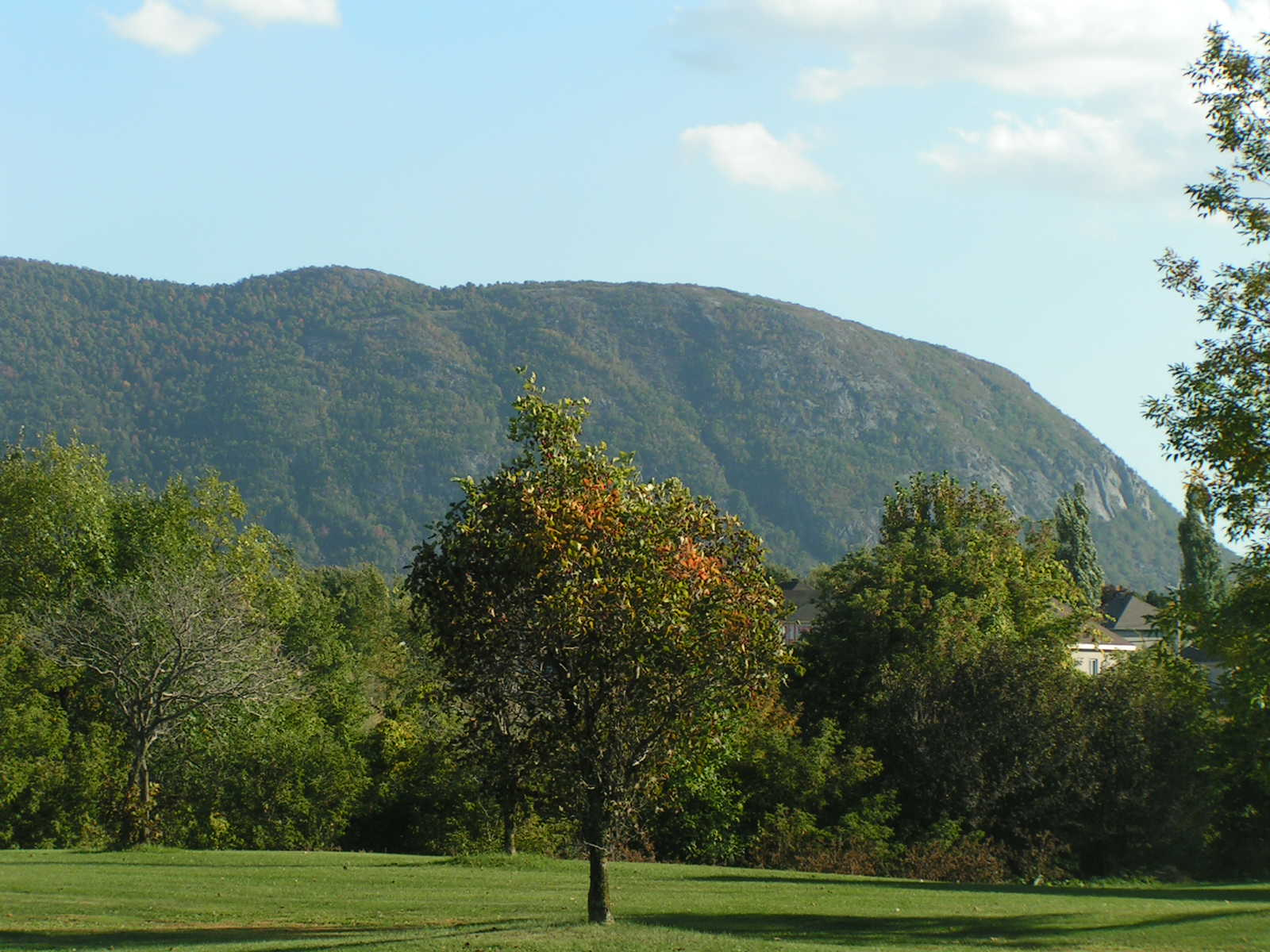
Gault-de-l'Université-McGill Nature Reserve

A nature reserve is private land recognized by the Ministry of Sustainable Development, Environment and Parks for its biological, wildlife, plant, geological or other value. The level of protection of these territories can vary greatly from one reserve to another. Quebec's 33 nature reserves protect 25 square kilometres (9.7 sq mi) of the province.

== Wildlife management areas ==
Although it is not a protected area, the Ministère des Ressources naturelles et de la Faune also has several types of wildlife management territories, including protected areas, outfitters and the ZECs.

=== Wildlife reserves ===
Wildlife reserves are public hunting and fishing grounds dedicated to the conservation, development and use of wildlife as well as, incidentally, the practice of recreational activities. There are currently has 21 wildlife reserves in Quebec covering a territory of 66,886 square kilometres (25,825 sq mi) and 524 kilometres (326 mi) of salmon rivers. They are all administered by the Société des établissements de plein air du Québec with the exception of the wildlife reserves of Duchénier, Dunière, and those located on salmon rivers which are managed by local organizations.

=== Controlled exploitation zone (Zec) ===
The 86 controlled zones (zec) are hunting and fishing territories located on public lands. They are administered by non-profit organizations.

== International recognition ==
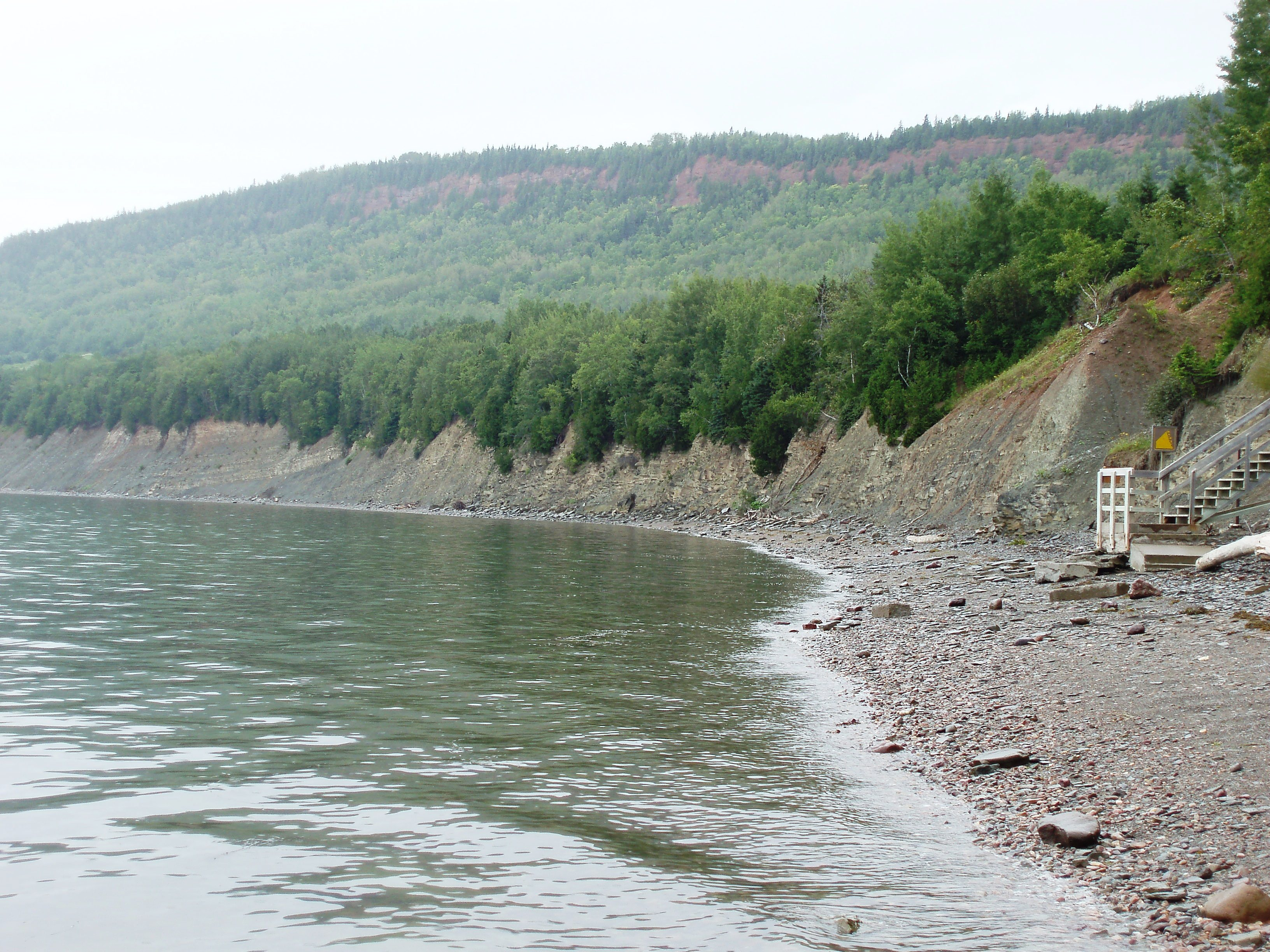
Miguasha National Park

Quebec has a natural world heritage site, namely Miguasha National Park. The province also has four biosphere reserves, i.e. the biosphere reserves of Charlevoix, Lake Saint-Pierre, Manicouagan-Uapishka, and Mont-Saint-Hilaire. Finally, four Ramsar sites are included in Quebec, namely Isle-Verte Bay, Cap Tourmente, Lake Saint François, and Lake Saint-Pierre.
