= Réserve écologique André-Linteau =

- André-Linteau Ecological Reserve
- IUCN category Ia (strict nature reserve)
- Location within Quebec
- Nearest city: Rapides-des-Joachims
- Coordinates: 46.205999°N 77.775583°W
- Area: 91.13 ha (225.2 acres)
- Designated: 1993
- Administrator: Ministry of Sustainable Development, Environment, and Fight Against Climate Change

The Réserve écologique André-Linteau (André-Linteau Ecological Reserve) is an ecological reserve in Quebec, Canada. It protects a high quality forest of white pine growing beside the Ottawa River.

== Location ==
The Réserve écologique André-Linteau is located in the northwest of the Outaouais region in the Pontiac Regional County Municipality, 5 kilometres (3.1 mi) northwest of the municipality of Rapides-des-Joachims. It has an area of 91.13 hectares (225.2 acres). It is roughly rectangular, bounded by Ferris Brook to the northwest, the Ottawa River to the southwest and southeast, and a straight line to the northeast.

It is an Ecological reserve with IUCN protected area categories IA (Strict Nature Reserve), designated in 1993. The reserve is named after André Linteau (1910–66), the first doctor of silviculture in Quebec. It is one of three ecological reserves in or near the Dumoine River watershed, the other two being the Aigle-à-Tête-Blanche Ecological Reserve and the James-Little Ecological Reserve.

== Terrain ==
The region is a peneplain of hills with elevation of 250 to 500 metres (820 to 1,640 ft) above sea level. The ecological reserve is on a terrace 50 metres (160 ft) above the Ottawa River. The bedrock is mostly made up of crystalline gneiss, quartzite and limestone. There are covered with glacial tills of varying thickness. The thick sandy and silty surface deposits are mostly recent, formed as terraces at the mouth of the Ferris stream.

== Vegetation ==
The reserve protects a high quality forest of white pine growing on a deposit of thick sand. The site is dominated by white pines, including large diameter trees and excellent regeneration of pines in the gaps, with some occurrences of red pine, large-tooth aspen, trembling aspen and red maple. Forests of this type were once common in the region, but are now rare.

== Sources ==
- Le Bassin Versant de la Rivière Dumoine Comme Aire Protégée (PDF) (in French), UQCN: Union Québécoise pour la conservation de la nature
- Raymond Houde (14 September 1992), Règlement de constitution de la réserve écologique André-Linteau (in French)
- Réserve écologique André-Linteau (in French), MDDELCC - Ministère du Développement durable, de l'Environnement et de la Lutte contre les changements climatiques
- Réserve écologique André-Linteau, ProtectedPlanet
