= Ecological reserves of Quebec =

Ecological reserves of Quebec are protected areas devoted to conservation, education and research. They are generally closed to the public, with the exception of Serpentine-de-Coleraine, Forêt-la-Blanche des Tourbières-de-Lanoraie and Île-Brion. They are managed by the Ministry of Sustainable Development, Environment, Wildlife and Parks. According to the protected area classification of the International Union for the Conservation of Nature, Quebec's ecological reserves fall into IUCN category 1a, which is the highest level of protection in the world. Thus, there is no exploration or exploitation of natural resources, no roads can pass through the reserve, no energy equipment is allowed and hunting, trapping and fishing activities are prohibited.

== List of ecological reserves ==
Reserves include:

Ecological reserve that is part of a biosphere reserve

Ecological reserve	Area		Created	Regional county municipality
Ecological reserve	km^{2}	sqmi	Created	Regional county municipality
Aigle-à-Tête-Blanche	2.67	1.03	1993	Pontiac
André-Linteau	0.91	0.35	1993	Pontiac
André-Michaux	4.50	1.74	1993	La Vallée-de-la-Gatineau
Bog-à-Lanières	4.30	1.66	1992	La Tuque
Boisé-des-Muir	0.12	0.046	1995	Le Haut-Saint-Laurent
Caribous-de-Jourdan	7.12	2.75	1994	La Vallée-de-l'Or
Charles-B.-Banville	10.02	3.87	1998	Rimouski-Neigette
Chênaie-des-Îles-Finlay	0.94	0.36	2007	Pontiac
Chicobi	21.23	8.20	2002	Abitibi
Claude-Mélançon	5.35	2.07	1988	Bellechasse
Couchepaganiche	0.39	0.15	1983	Lac-Saint-Jean-Est
Dunes-de-Berry	2.59	1.00	1996	Abitibi
Dunes-de-la-Moraine-d'Harricana	5.40	2.08	1994	Rouyn-Noranda
Érablière-du-Trente-et-Un-Milles	6.06	2.34	1994	La Vallée-de-la-Gatineau
Ernest-Lepage	8.10	3.13	1983	Bonaventure
Fernald	7.35	2.84	1995	La Matanie
Forêt-la-Blanche	20.52	7.92	2003	Papineau
G.-Oscar-Villeneuve	5.67	2.19	1989	Le Fjord-du-Saguenay
Grand-Lac-Salé	23.39	9.03	1996	Minganie
Grande-Rivière	173.00	66.80	2001	Le Rocher-Percé
Grands-Ormes	9.20	3.55	1994	Charlevoix-Est
Île-Brion	6.50	2.51	1988	Les Îles-de-la-Madeleine
Île-Garth	0.17	0.066	2003	Thérèse-De Blainville
Îles-Avelle-Wight-et-Hiam	0.90	0.35	1994	Vaudreuil-Soulanges
Irénée-Marie	1.89	0.73	1985	Mékinac
Irène-Fournier	4.40	1.70	1991	La Matanie
Jackrabbit	7.50	2.90	1981	Les Laurentides
James-Little	2.04	0.79	1981	Pontiac
J.-Clovis-Laflamme	10.15	3.92	1991	Le Domaine-du-Roy
Judith-De Brésoles	10.90	4.21	1992	La Tuque
Jules-Carpentier	0.05	0.019	2000	Portneuf
Kettles-de-Berry	2.67	1.03	1996	Abitibi
Lac-à-la-Tortue	5.66	2.19	1992	Shawinigan
Lac-Malakisis	30.27	11.69	1978	Témiscamingue
Léon-Provancher	4.84	1.87	1999	Bécancour
Lionel-Cinq-Mars	4.40	1.70	1988	Lotbinière
Louis-Babel	235.40	90.89	1991	Manicouagan
Louis-Ovide-Brunet	6.69	2.58	1989	Le Domaine-du-Roy
Louis-Zéphirin-Rousseau	0.05	0.019	1988	Antoine-Labelle
Manche-d'Épée	5.73	2.21	1984	La Haute-Gaspésie
Marcel-Léger	0.36	0.14	1981	Trois-Rivières
Marcelle-Gauvreau	1.14	0.44	1990	Le Fjord-du-Saguenay
Marcel-Raymond	0.64	0.25	1987	Le Haut-Richelieu
Marie-Jean-Eudes	8.45	3.26	1992	Maskinongé
Matamec	186.0	71.8	1995	Sept-Rivières
Micocoulier	0.29	0.11	1981	Vaudreuil-Soulanges
Mine-aux-Pipistrelles	0.03	0.012	2002	Memphrémagog
Mont-Gosford	3.07	1.19	2013	Le Granit
Mont-Saint-Pierre	6.43	2.48	2001	La Haute-Gaspésie
Père-Louis-Marie	3.15	1.22	1993	La Vallée-de-la-Gatineau
Pin-Rigide	0.66	0.25	1977	Le Haut-Saint-Laurent
Pointe-Heath	18.69	7.22	1978	Minganie
Pointe-Platon	0.59	0.23	1995	Lotbinière
Presqu'île-Robillard	0.84	0.32	2000	Argenteuil
Ristigouche	4.68	1.81	1983	Avignon
Rivière-aux-Brochets	1.26	0.49	1999	Brome-Missisquoi
Rivière-du-Moulin	0.11	0.042	1975	Lotbinière
Rivière-Rouge	3.13	1.21	1997	Argenteuil
Rolland-Germain	13.70	5.29	1991	La Vallée-de-la-Gatineau
Ruisseau-de-l'Indien	3.24	1.25	1991	Pontiac
Samuel-Brisson	7.90	3.05	1982	Le Haut-Saint-François
Serpentine-de-Coleraine	3.97	1.53	2003	Les Appalaches
Tantaré	14.50	5.60	1978	La Jacques-Cartier
Tapani	0.17	0.066	1988	Antoine-Labelle
Thomas-Fortin	1.18	0.46	1990	Charlevoix
Thomas-Sterry-Hunt	0.56	0.22	1988	Montmagny
Tourbière-de-Shannon	1.69	0.65	2011	La Jacques-Cartier
Tourbières-de-Lanoraie	4.15	1.60	1994	D'Autray
Vallée-du-Ruiter	1.17	0.45	1993	Memphrémagog
Victor-A.-Huard	0.20	0.077	1990	Le Fjord-du-Saguenay
Vieux-Arbres	0.04	0.015	1992	Abitibi-Ouest
William-Baldwin	2.91	1.12	1992	Abitibi

== Sources ==
- Les réserves écologiques, Des habitats protégés au naturel (in French), Gouvernement du Québec, 2019
- Qu'est-ce qu'une réserve écologique? (in French), Gouvernement du Québec, 2019
