= Tourbière-de-Shannon Ecological Reserve =

Ecological reserve in Quebec, Canada

- Réserve écologique de la Tourbière-de-Shannon
- IUCN category Ia (strict nature reserve)
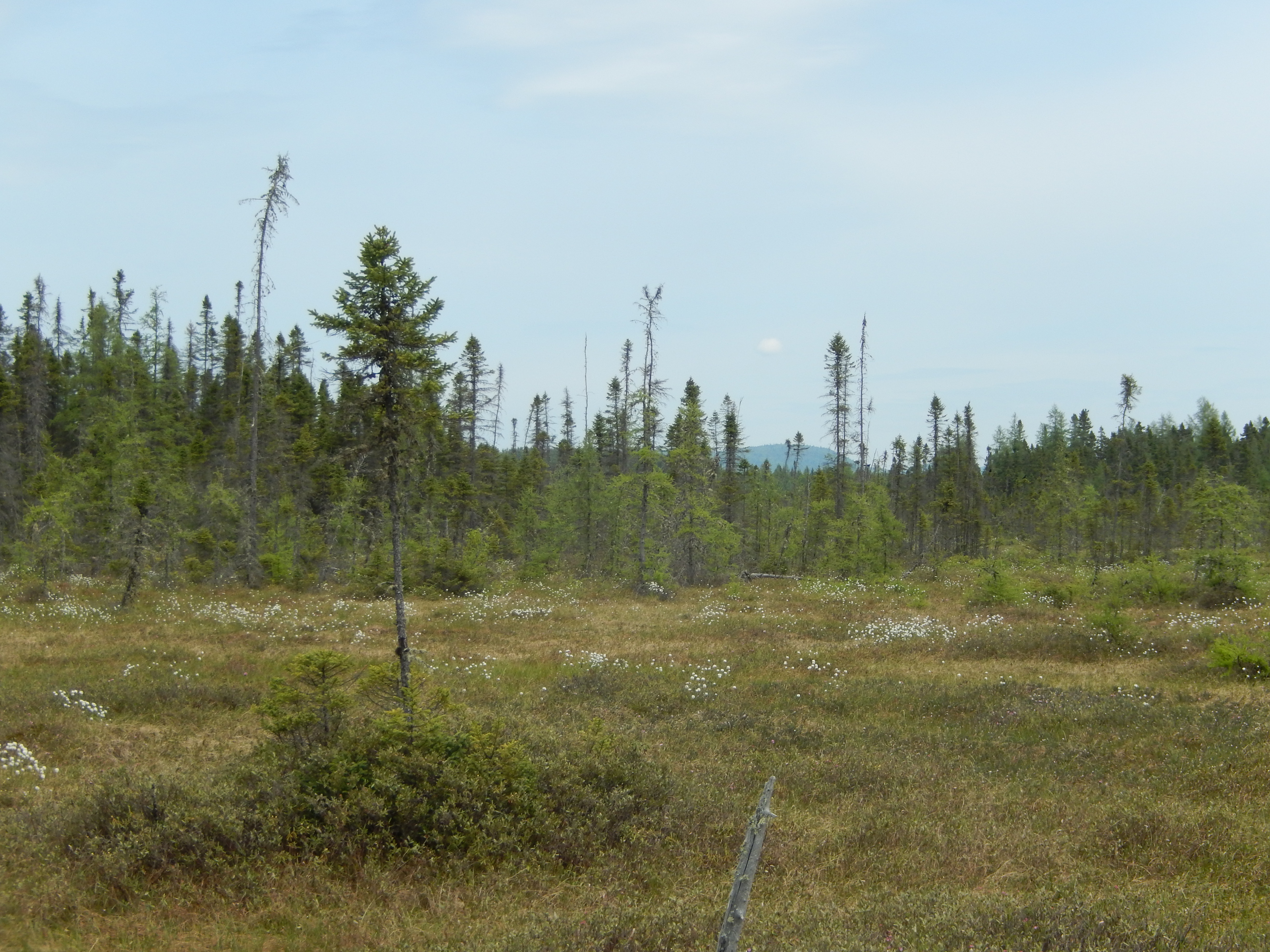
- The bog on 1 June 2014

- Location within Quebec
- Nearest town: Shannon, Quebec
- Coordinates: 46.902460°N 71.542931°W
- Area: 168.77 ha (417.0 acres)
- Elevation: 180 metres (590 ft)
- Designation: ecological reserve of Quebec
- Established: 6 April 2011
- Administrator: Ministry of Sustainable Development, Environment, and Fight Against Climate Change

The Tourbière-de-Shannon Ecological Reserve (French: Réserve écologique de la Tourbière-de-Shannon) is a strictly protected ecological reserve of Quebec, Canada.

== Location ==

The Tourbière-de-Shannon Ecological Reserve is in the municipality of Shannon, Jacques-Cartier Regional County Municipality, Capitale-Nationale administrative region. It is about 30 kilometres (19 mi) northwest of Quebec City. It is in the north side of the Jacques-Cartier River valley at an altitude of 180 metres (590 ft). It covers 168.77 hectares (417.0 acres) of the 250 hectares (620 acres) Tourbière de Shannon (Note: Tourbière means "bog" in French, so the Tourbière de Shannon is the Shannon Bog.), an ombrotrophic bog.

The region was covered by the massive Laurentide Ice Sheet, which retreated almost 12,500 years ago and made way for the Champlain Sea. As the land rose due to post-glacial rebound the sea retreated and the Saint Lawrence River developed about 9.500 years ago. The land covered by the Tourbière de Shannon was in the Jacques-Cartier River delta on the border between the Laurentian Mountains and the Champlain Sea, and is dominated by thick sandy glaciofluvial deposits.

== Environment ==
The Tourbière-de-Shannon Ecological Reserve is in the Basses-collines-du-lac-Saint-Joseph ecological district of the Southern Laurentide natural province. The reserve is in the maple / basswood bioclimatic domain, with a subpolar and continental climate. The growing season is 170–180 days. Average annual temperature is 2.5 to 5 °C (36.5 to 41.0 °F). Average annual precipitation is 1,000 to 1,300 millimetres (39 to 51 in).

== Rare species ==
The Tourbière de Shannon holds over 1,000 individuals of the eastern prairie fringed orchid (Platanthera blephariglottis), growing near groves of larch and black spruce in open and semi-open areas. There are also over 500 individuals of the southern twayblade (Listera australis) in areas where trees and shrubs give good protection, often on the south side of groves. This is the second largest population of Southern Twayblade in Québec.

== Sources ==
- Gérin-Lajoie, José (2009), Réserve écologique de la Tourbière-de-Shannon, Portrait of territory (PDF), Gouvernement of Québec, Ministère du Développement durable, de l’Environnement et des Parcs, Direction du patrimoine écologique et des parcs, p. 36
