= Fernald Ecological Reserve =

Ecological reserve of Quebec (Canada)

Coordinates: 48.8906°N 66.6897°W

- IUCN category Ia (strict nature reserve)
- Interactive map of Fernald Ecological Reserve
- Location: Rivière-Bonjour, La Matanie Regional County Municipality, Québec, Canada
- Established: 1995

Fernald Ecological Reserve is an ecological reserve of Quebec, Canada. It was established in 1995.
