= Micocoulier Ecological Reserve =

Coordinates: 45.2833°N 74.175°W

- IUCN category Ia (strict nature reserve)
- Interactive map of Micocoulier Ecological Reserve
- Location: Coteau-du-Lac, Vaudreuil-Soulanges Regional County Municipality, Québec, Canada
- Established: January 7, 1981

Micocoulier Ecological Reserve is an ecological reserve in Quebec, Canada. It was established on January 7, 1981.
