= Manche-d'Épée Ecological Reserve =

Ecological reserve in Quebec, Canada

Coordinates: 49.2125°N 65.4472°W

- IUCN category Ia (strict nature reserve)
- Interactive map of Manche-d'Épée Ecological Reserve
- Location: Sainte-Madeleine-de-la-Rivière-Madeleine, La Haute-Gaspésie Regional County Municipality, Québec, Canada
- Established: April 11, 1984

Manche-d'Épée Ecological Reserve is an ecological reserve in Quebec, Canada. It was established on April 11, 1984.
