= William-Baldwin Ecological Reserve =

Coordinates: 48.9181°N 78.4028°W

- IUCN category Ia (strict nature reserve)
- Interactive map of William-Baldwin Ecological Reserve
- Location: Berry, Abitibi Regional County Municipality, Québec, Canada
- Established: May 27, 1992

William-Baldwin Ecological Reserve is an ecological reserve in Quebec, Canada. It was established on May 27, 1992.
