= Caribous-de-Jourdan Ecological Reserve =

Ecological reserve in Quebec, Canada

- IUCN category Ia (strict nature reserve)
- Location within Quebec Location within Canada
- Location: Val-d'Or, La Vallée-de-l'Or Regional County Municipality, Québec, Canada
- Coordinates: 47°47′40″N 77°53′38″W
- Established: 1994

Caribous-de-Jourdan Ecological Reserve (French: Réserve écologique des Caribous-de-Jourdan) is an ecological reserve of Quebec, Canada. It was established on August 19, 1994.
