= Dunes-de-Berry Ecological Reserve =

Ecological reserve in Quebec, Canada

Coordinates: 48.8°N 78.3917°W

- IUCN category Ia (strict nature reserve)
- Interactive map of Dunes-de-Berry Ecological Reserve
- Location: Berry, Abitibi Regional County Municipality, Québec, Canada
- Established: December 24, 1996

Dunes-de-Berry Ecological Reserve is an ecological reserve of Quebec, Canada. It was established on December 24, 1996.
