= Lionel-Cinq-Mars Ecological Reserve =

Ecological reserve in Quebec, Canada

Coordinates: 46.5139°N 71.7708°W

- IUCN category Ia (strict nature reserve)
- Interactive map of Lionel-Cinq-Mars Ecological Reserve
- Location: Leclercville / Saint-Édouard-de-Lotbinière, Lotbinière Regional County Municipality, Québec, Canada
- Established: February 17, 1988

Lionel-Cinq-Mars Ecological Reserve is an ecological reserve in Quebec, Canada. It was established on February 17, 1988.
