= Lac-Malakisis Ecological Reserve =

Ecological reserve in Quebec, Canada

Coordinates: 46.7°N 78.65°W

- IUCN category Ia (strict nature reserve)
- Interactive map of Lac-Malakisis Ecological Reserve
- Location: Les Lacs-du-Témiscamingue, Témiscamingue Regional County Municipality, Québec, Canada
- Established: 1978

Lac-Malakisis Ecological Reserve is an ecological reserve in Quebec, Canada. It was established in 1978 but underwent change in 2003. Lac-Malakisis Ecological Reserve is northwest of Lac du Marais.
