= Chênaie-des-Îles-Finlay Ecological Reserve =

Ecological reserve of Quebec, Canada

Coordinates: 45.9014°N 76.8747°W

- IUCN category Ia (strict nature reserve)
- Interactive map of Chênaie-des-Îles-Finlay Ecological Reserve
- Location: Waltham, Pontiac Regional County Municipality, Québec, Canada
- Established: March 7, 2007

Chênaie-des-Îles-Finlay Ecological Reserve is an ecological reserve of Quebec, Canada. It was established on March 7, 2007.
