= Couchepaganiche Ecological Reserve =

Ecological reserve in Quebec, Canada

Coordinates: 48.3681°N 71.8389°W

- IUCN category Ia (strict nature reserve)
- Interactive map of Couchepaganiche Ecological Reserve
- Location: Métabetchouan–Lac-à-la-Croix, Lac-Saint-Jean-Est Regional County Municipality, Québec, Canada
- Established: February 11, 1983

Couchepaganiche Ecological Reserve is an ecological reserve of Quebec, Canada. It was established on February 11, 1983.
