= Chicobi Ecological Reserve =

Ecological reserve of Quebec, Canada

Coordinates: 48.8472°N 78.5711°W

- IUCN category Ia (strict nature reserve)
- Interactive map of Chicobi Ecological Reserve
- Location: Lac-Chicobi, Abitibi Regional County Municipality, Québec, Canada
- Established: 2002

Chicobi Ecological Reserve is an ecological reserve of Quebec, Canada. It was established on May 11, 2002.
