= Louis-Ovide-Brunet Ecological Reserve =

Ecological reserve in Quebec, Canada

Coordinates: 48.2736°N 72.0889°W

- IUCN category Ia (strict nature reserve)
- Interactive map of Louis-Ovide-Brunet Ecological Reserve
- Location: Lac-Bouchette / Saint-André-du-Lac-Saint-Jean, Le Domaine-du-Roy Regional County Municipality, Québec, Canada
- Established: August 30, 1989

Louis-Ovide-Brunet Ecological Reserve is an ecological reserve in Quebec, Canada. It was established on August 30, 1989
