= Île-Brion Ecological Reserve =

Ecological reserve in Quebec, Canada

Coordinates: 47.7889°N 61.4792°W

- IUCN category Ia (strict nature reserve)
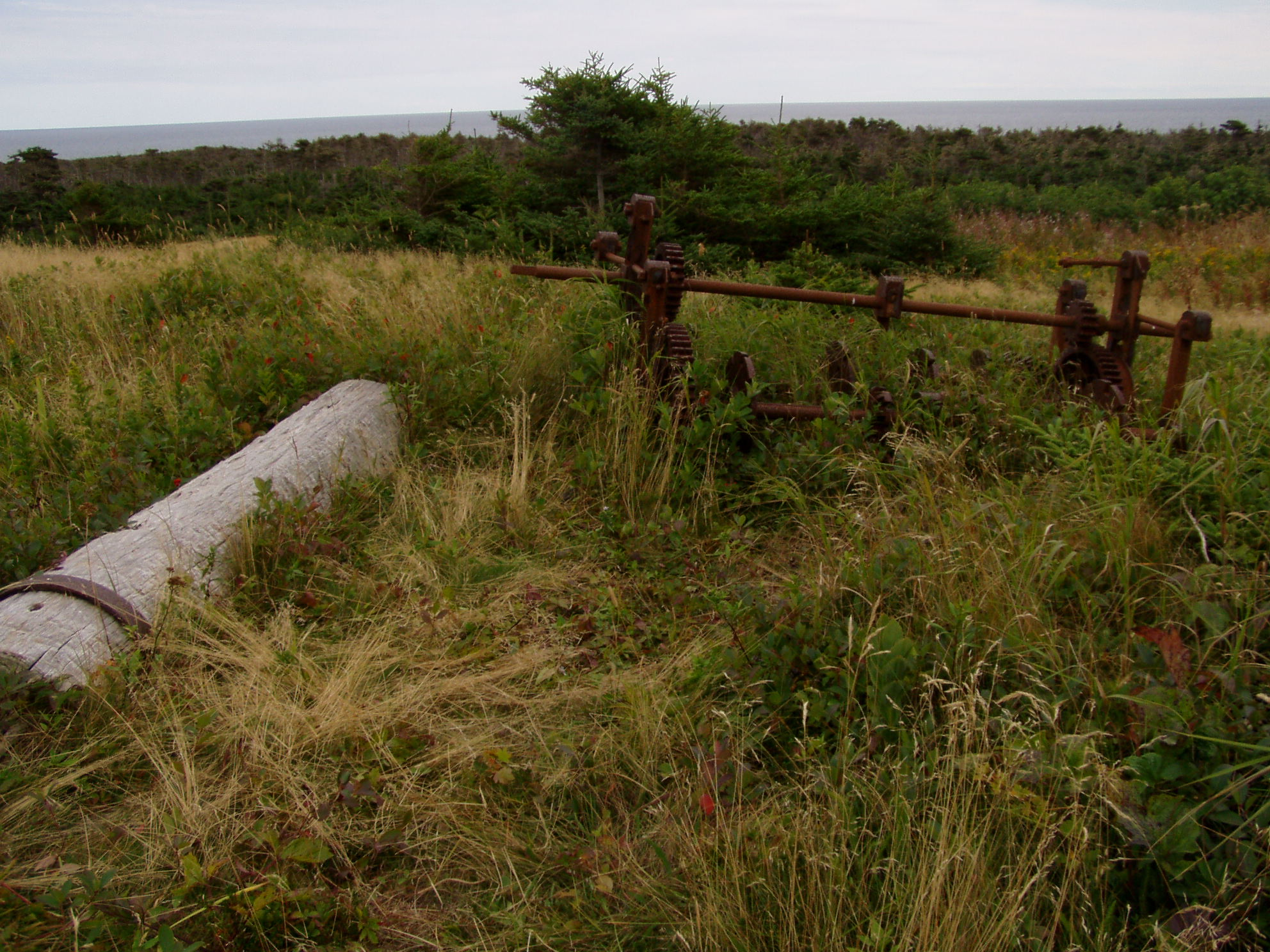
- Brion Island
- Interactive map of Île-Brion Ecological Reserve
- Location: Grosse-Île, Îles de la Madeleine (Magdalen Islands), Québec, Canada
- Established: August 24, 1988

Île-Brion Ecological Reserve (French: Réserve écologique de l'Île-Brion, pronounced [ʁezɛʁv ekɔlɔʒik də lil bʁijɔ̃]) is an ecological reserve of Quebec, Canada. It was established on August 24, 1988.
