= Rivière-Rouge Ecological Reserve =

- IUCN category Ia (strict nature reserve)
- Interactive map of Rivière-Rouge Ecological Reserve
- Location: Grenville-sur-la-Rouge, Argenteuil Regional County Municipality, Québec, Canada
- Coordinates: 45°41′06″N 74°39′53″W
- Area: 313 hectares (770 acres)
- Established: November 19, 1997
- Governing body: Ministère du Développement durable, de l'Environnement et des Parcs du Québec

Rivière-Rouge Ecological Reserve is an ecological reserve in Quebec, Canada. It was established on November 19, 1997.
