= Grande-Rivière Ecological Reserve =

Coordinates: 48.5922°N 64.705°W

- IUCN category Ia (strict nature reserve)
- Interactive map of Grande-Rivière Ecological Reserve
- Location: Mont-Alexandre, Le Rocher-Percé Regional County Municipality, Québec, Canada
- Established: February 14, 2001

Grande-Rivière Ecological Reserve (French: Réserve écologique de la Grande-Rivière, pronounced [ʁezɛʁv ekɔlɔʒik də la ɡʁɑ̃d ʁivjɛʁ]) is an ecological reserve of Quebec, Canada. It was established on February 14, 2001.
