= Thomas-Fortin Ecological Reserve =

Coordinates: 47.6917°N 71.0458°W

- IUCN category Ia (strict nature reserve)
- Interactive map of Thomas-Fortin Ecological Reserve
- Location: Lac-Pikauba, Charlevoix Regional County Municipality, Québec, Canada
- Established: May 8, 1990

Thomas-Fortin Ecological Reserve is an ecological reserve in Quebec, Canada. It was established on May 8, 1990.
