= Père-Louis-Marie Ecological Reserve =

Ecological reserve in Quebec, Canada

Coordinates: 46.2167°N 75.8361°W

- IUCN category Ia (strict nature reserve)
- Interactive map of Père-Louis-Marie Ecological Reserve
- Location: Bouchette, La Vallée-de-la-Gatineau Regional County Municipality, Québec, Canada
- Established: May 12, 1993

Père-Louis-Marie Ecological Reserve (French: Réserve écologique du Père-Louis-Marie, pronounced [ʁezɛʁv ekɔlɔʒik dy pɛʁ lwi maʁi]) is an ecological reserve in Quebec, Canada. It was established on May 12, 1993.
