= Irène-Fournier Ecological Reserve =

Ecological reserve in Quebec, Canada

Coordinates: 48.6528°N 66.2403°W

- IUCN category Ia (strict nature reserve)
- Interactive map of Irène-Fournier Ecological Reserve
- Location: Rivière-Bonjour, La Matanie Regional County Municipality, Québec, Canada
- Established: November 20, 1991

Irène-Fournier Ecological Reserve is an ecological reserve in Quebec, Canada. It was established on November 20, 1991.
