= Marcel-Léger Ecological Reserve =

Ecological reserve

Coordinates: 47.2875°N 72.625°W

- IUCN category Ia (strict nature reserve)
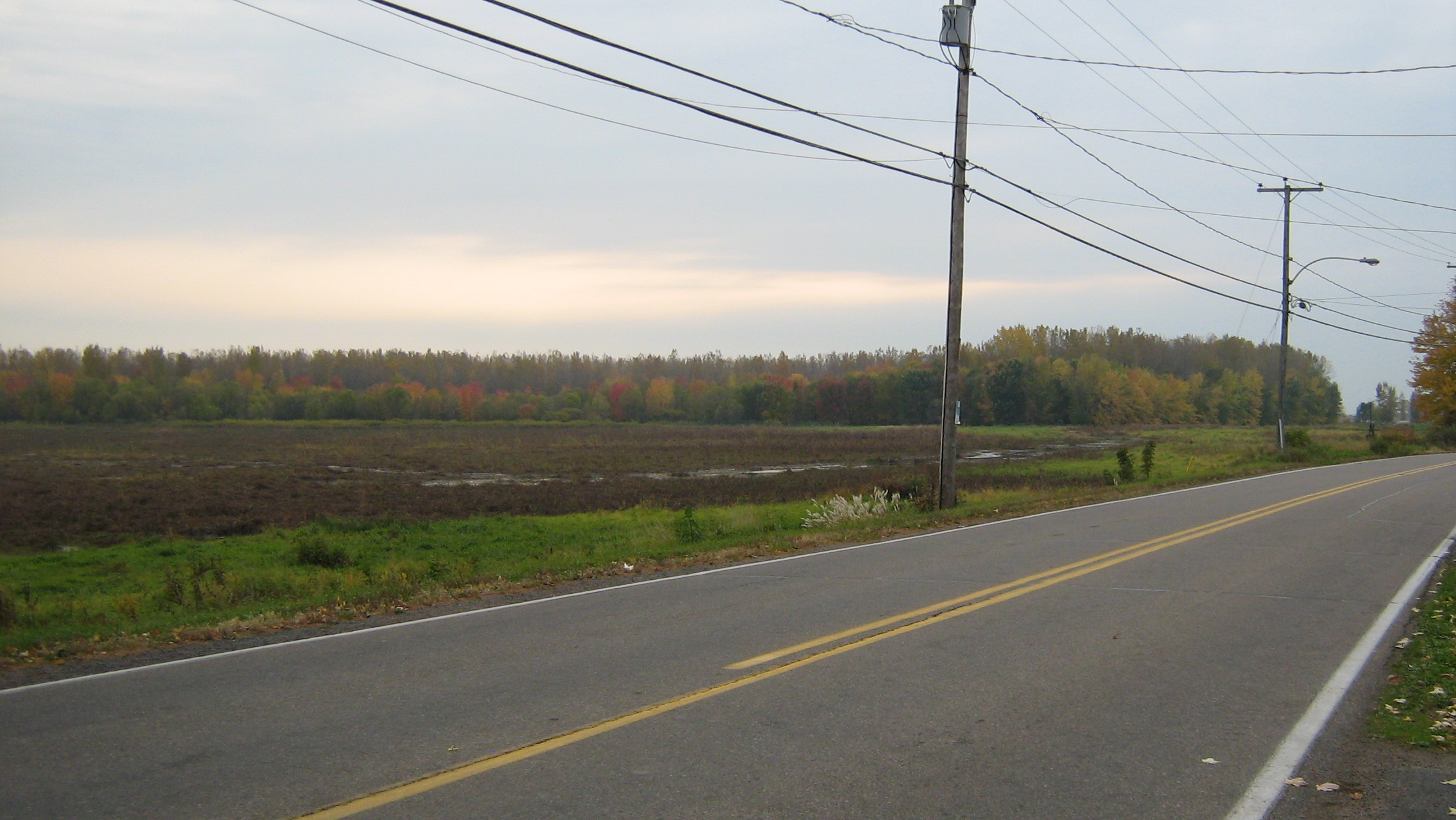
- Île aux Sternes
- Interactive map of Marcel-Léger Ecological Reserve
- Location: Trois-Rivières, Quebec, Canada
- Established: 1981

Marcel-Léger Ecological Reserve (French: Réserve Écologique Marcel-Léger) is an ecological reserve in Trois-Rivières, Quebec, Canada. It was established in 1981.
