= Vieux-Arbres Ecological Reserve =

Nature reserve in Quebec, Canada

- IUCN category Ia (strict nature reserve)
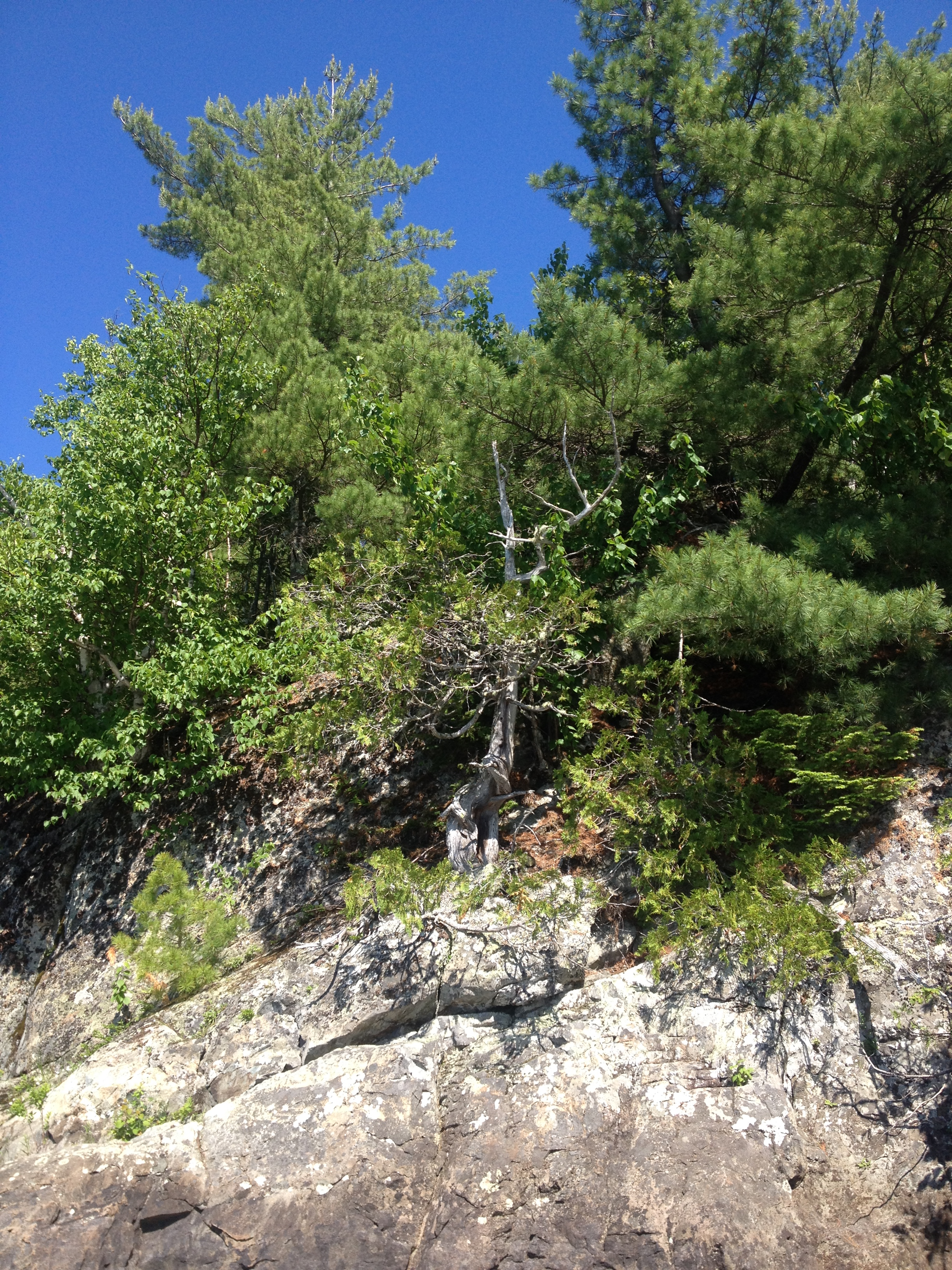
- 1000 years-old Thuja occidentalis tree in Lake Duparquet
- Interactive map of Vieux-Arbres Ecological Reserve
- Location: Duparquet, Quebec, Canada
- Coordinates: 48.4639°N 79.2542°W
- Area: 0.4 km^{2} (0.2 sq mi)
- Established: May 27, 1992
- Governing body: Ministère de l'Environnement et de la Lutte contre les changements climatiques

Vieux-Arbres Ecological Reserve is an ecological reserve in Quebec, Canada. It was established May 27, 1992.
