= Vallée-du-Ruiter Ecological Reserve =

Coordinates: 45.0986°N 72.4319°W

- IUCN category Ia (strict nature reserve)
- Interactive map of Vallée-du-Ruiter Ecological Reserve
- Location: Potton, Memphrémagog Regional County Municipality, Québec, Canada
- Established: 1993

Vallée-du-Ruiter Ecological Reserve is an ecological reserve in Quebec, Canada. It was established on October 21, 1993.
