= J.-Clovis-Laflamme Ecological Reserve =

Ecological reserve in Quebec, Canada

Coordinates: 48.3417°N 72.5597°W

- IUCN category Ia (strict nature reserve)
- Interactive map of J.-Clovis-Laflamme Ecological Reserve
- Location: Sainte-Hedwidge, Le Domaine-du-Roy Regional County Municipality, Québec, Canada
- Established: October 9, 1991

J.-Clovis-Laflamme Ecological Reserve is an ecological reserve in Quebec, Canada. It was established on October 9, 1991.
