= Jules-Carpentier Ecological Reserve =

Ecological reserve in Quebec, Canada

Coordinates: 46.7778°N 71.6658°W

- IUCN category Ia (strict nature reserve)
- Interactive map of Jules-Carpentier Ecological Reserve
- Location: Pont-Rouge, Portneuf Regional County Municipality, Québec, Canada
- Established: March 15, 2000

Jules-Carpentier Ecological Reserve is an ecological reserve in Quebec, Canada. It was established on May 18, 2000.

The reserve is named after local Jules Carpentier. The reserve consists mainly of, Red spruce, balsam fir and White pine.
