= Samuel-Brisson Ecological Reserve =

Ecological reserve in Quebec, Canada

Coordinates: 45.4833°N 71.1389°W

- IUCN category Ia (strict nature reserve)
- Interactive map of Samuel-Brisson Ecological Reserve
- Location: Val-Racine, Le Granit Regional County Municipality, Québec, Canada
- Established: February 17, 1988

Samuel-Brisson Ecological Reserve is an ecological reserve in Quebec, Canada. It was established on February 17, 1988.
