= Louis-Zéphirin-Rousseau Ecological Reserve =

Ecological reserve in Quebec, Canada

Coordinates: 46.2736°N 75.7875°W

- IUCN category Ia (strict nature reserve)
- Interactive map of Louis-Zéphirin-Rousseau Ecological Reserve
- Location: Notre-Dame-de-Pontmain, Antoine-Labelle Regional County Municipality, Québec, Canada
- Established: May 4, 1988

Louis-Zéphirin-Rousseau Ecological Reserve is an ecological reserve in Quebec, Canada. It was established on May 4, 1988.
