= Judith-De Brésoles Ecological Reserve =

Ecological reserve in Quebec, Canada

Coordinates: 47.6125°N 72.3111°W

- IUCN category Ia (strict nature reserve)
- Interactive map of Judith-De Brésoles Ecological Reserve
- Location: Lac-Édouard, Québec, Canada
- Established: 1992

Judith-De Brésoles Ecological Reserve is an ecological reserve in Quebec, Canada. It was established in 1992.
