= Jackrabbit Ecological Reserve =

Ecological reserve in Quebec, Canada

Coordinates: 46.0069°N 74.4736°W

- IUCN category Ia (strict nature reserve)
- Interactive map of Jackrabbit Ecological Reserve
- Location: Montcalm, Les Laurentides Regional County Municipality, Québec, Canada
- Established: January 7, 1981

Jackrabbit Ecological Reserve (French: Réserve écologique Jackrabbit) is an ecological reserve in Quebec, Canada. It was established on January 7, 1981.

== Name ==
Jackrabbit Ecological Reserve was originally name Laurentides Ecological Reserve in 1981. In 1992, it was renamed after the nickname of Herman Smith-Johannsen (1875–1987), who introduced and promoted skiing in Canada.
