= Mine-aux-Pipistrelles Ecological Reserve =

Ecological reserve of Quebec

Coordinates: 45.1542°N 72.3944°W

- IUCN category Ia (strict nature reserve)
- Interactive map of Mine-aux-Pipistrelles Ecological Reserve
- Location: Potton, Memphrémagog Regional County Municipality, Québec, Canada
- Established: 10 April 2002

Mine-aux-Pipistrelles Ecological Reserve is an ecological reserve in Quebec, Canada. It was established on 10 April 2002. It is the first ecological reserve in an underground environment. The reserve contains 5 species of bats that hibernate in Quebec: Myotis lucifugus, Eptesicus fuscus, Myotis septentrionalis, Myotis leibii and Pipistrellus subflavus.
