= Ernest-Lepage Ecological Reserve =

Coordinates: 48.525°N 65.7167°W

- IUCN category Ia (strict nature reserve)
- Interactive map of Ernest-Lepage Ecological Reserve
- Location: Rivière-Bonaventure, Bonaventure Regional County Municipality, Québec, Canada
- Established: April 27, 1983

Ernest-Lepage Ecological Reserve is an ecological reserve of Quebec, Canada. It was established on April 27, 1983.
