= Rolland-Germain Ecological Reserve =

Ecological reserve in Quebec, Canada

Coordinates: 46.6625°N 76.0819°W

- IUCN category Ia (strict nature reserve)
- Interactive map of Rolland-Germain Ecological Reserve
- Location: Montcerf-Lytton, La Vallée-de-la-Gatineau Regional County Municipality, Québec, Canada
- Established: June 19, 1991

Rolland-Germain Ecological Reserve is an ecological reserve in Quebec, Canada. It was established on June 19, 1991.
