= Île-Garth Ecological Reserve =

Ecological reserve of Quebec

Coordinates: 45.6567°N 73.7622°W

- IUCN category Ia (strict nature reserve)
- Interactive map of Île-Garth Ecological Reserve
- Location: Bois-des-Filion, Thérèse-De Blainville Regional County Municipality, Québec, Canada
- Established: April 30, 2003

Île-Garth Ecological Reserve is an ecological reserve of Quebec, Canada. It was established on April 30, 2003.
