= Pin-Rigide Ecological Reserve =

Coordinates: 45.0958°N 73.8694°W

- IUCN category Ia (strict nature reserve)
- Interactive map of Pin-Rigide Ecological Reserve
- Location: Franklin, Le Haut-Saint-Laurent Regional County Municipality, Québec, Canada
- Established: December 7, 1977

Pin-Rigide Ecological Reserve is an ecological reserve in Quebec, Canada. It was established on December 7, 1977.
