= Dunes-de-la-Moraine-d'Harricana Ecological Reserve =

Ecological Reserve in Quebec, Canada

- IUCN category Ia (strict nature reserve)
- Interactive map of Dunes-de-la-Moraine-d'Harricana Ecological Reserve
- Location: Rouyn-Noranda, Québec, Canada
- Coordinates: 47.783°N 78.252°W
- Established: 1994

Dunes-de-la-Moraine-d'Harricana Ecological Reserve is an ecological reserve in Quebec, Canada. It was established on August 19, 1994.
