= Érablière-du-Trente-et-Un-Milles Ecological Reserve =

Canadian reserve

Coordinates: 46.15°N 75.8583°W

- IUCN category Ia (strict nature reserve)
- Interactive map of Érablière-du-Trente-et-Un-Milles Ecological Reserve
- Location: Gracefield, La Vallée-de-la-Gatineau Regional County Municipality, Québec, Canada
- Established: November 26, 1992

Érablière-du-Trente-et-Un-Milles Ecological Reserve (French: Réserve écologique de l'Érablière-du-Trente-et-Un-Milles, pronounced [ʁezɛʁv ekɔlɔʒik də leʁabliɛʁ dy tʁɑ̃t e œ̃ mil]) is an ecological reserve of Quebec, Canada. It was established on November 26, 1992.
