= Marcel-Raymond Ecological Reserve =

Coordinates: 45.1236°N 73.2528°W

- IUCN category Ia (strict nature reserve)
- Interactive map of Marcel-Raymond Ecological Reserve
- Location: Henryville, Le Haut-Richelieu Regional County Municipality, Québec, Canada
- Established: May 27, 1987

Marcel-Raymond Ecological Reserve is an ecological reserve in Quebec, Canada. It was established on May 27, 1987.
