= Kettles-de-Berry Ecological Reserve =

Ecological reserve in Quebec, Canada

Coordinates: 48.8481°N 78.3944°W

- IUCN category Ia (strict nature reserve)
- Interactive map of Kettles-de-Berry Ecological Reserve
- Location: Berry, Abitibi Regional County Municipality, Québec, Canada
- Established: 1996

Kettles-de-Berry Ecological Reserve is an ecological reserve in Quebec, Canada. It was established in 1996.
