= Charles-B.-Banville Ecological Reserve =

Ecological reserve in Quebec, Canada

Coordinates: 48.2125°N 68.1417°W

- IUCN category Ia (strict nature reserve)
- Interactive map of Charles-B.-Banville Ecological Reserve
- Location: Lac-Huron, Rimouski-Neigette Regional County Municipality / Lac-des-Eaux-Mortes, La Mitis Regional County Municipality, Québec, Canada
- Established: April 1, 1998

Charles-B.-Banville Ecological Reserve is an ecological reserve of Quebec, Canada. It was established on April 1, 1998.
