= Ristigouche Ecological Reserve =

Ecological reserve in Quebec, Canada

Coordinates: 48.0361°N 66.8875°W

- IUCN category Ia (strict nature reserve)
- Interactive map of Ristigouche Ecological Reserve
- Location: Ristigouche-Sud-Est, Avignon Regional County Municipality, Québec, Canada
- Established: April 17, 1983

Ristigouche Ecological Reserve is an ecological reserve in Quebec, Canada. It was established on April 17, 1983.
