= Victor-A.-Huard Ecological Reserve =

Coordinates: 48.2161°N 71.2540°W

- IUCN category Ia (strict nature reserve)
- Interactive map of Victor-A.-Huard Ecological Reserve
- Location: Lac-Ministuk, Le Fjord-du-Saguenay Regional County Municipality, Québec, Canada
- Established: May 30, 1990

Victor-A.-Huard Ecological Reserve is an ecological reserve in Quebec, Canada. It was established May 30, 1990.
