= Marie-Jean-Eudes Ecological Reserve =

Ecological reserve in Quebec, Canada

Coordinates: 46.7014°N 73.1486°W

- IUCN category Ia (strict nature reserve)
- Interactive map of Marie-Jean-Eudes Ecological Reserve
- Location: Saint-Alexis-des-Monts, Maskinongé Regional County Municipality, Québec, Canada
- Established: 1992

Marie-Jean-Eudes Ecological Reserve is an ecological reserve in Quebec, Canada. It was established on April 15, 1992. It is located near La Mauricie National Park, northwest of the city of Shawinigan.
