= Lac-à-la-Tortue Ecological Reserve =

Ecological reserve in Quebec, Canada

Coordinates: 46.55°N 72.6667°W

- IUCN category Ia (strict nature reserve)
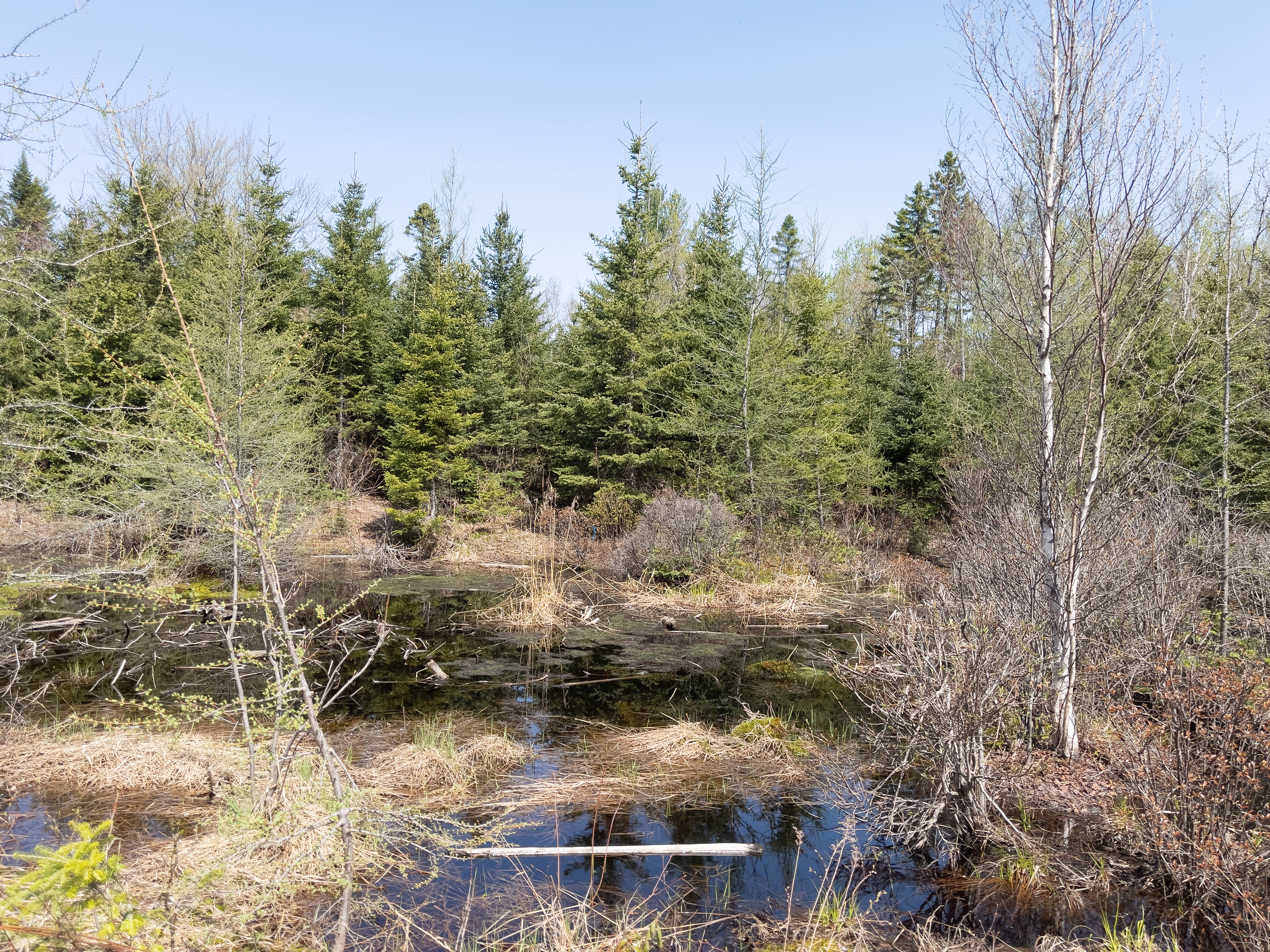
- Alternating ponds, shrub and wooded environments, Saint-Maurice
- Interactive map of Lac-à-la-Tortue Ecological Reserve
- Location: Shawinigan, Québec, Canada
- Established: May 27, 1992

Lac-à-la-Tortue Ecological Reserve (French: Réserve écologique de Lac-à-la-Tortue, pronounced [ʁezɛʁv ekɔlɔʒik də lak a la tɔʁty]) is an ecological reserve in Quebec, Canada. It was established on May 27, 1992.

« . . . Peatlands are wetlands composed of plant residues accumulated over thousands of years. Although they are widespread in the Quebec landscape, they remain unknown to a large part of the population. However they provide us with many essential ecological services, such as water filtration and flood control. They are also valuable allies in the fight against climate change through their role in carbon capture. »

Some species observed in Lac-à-la-Tortue Bog

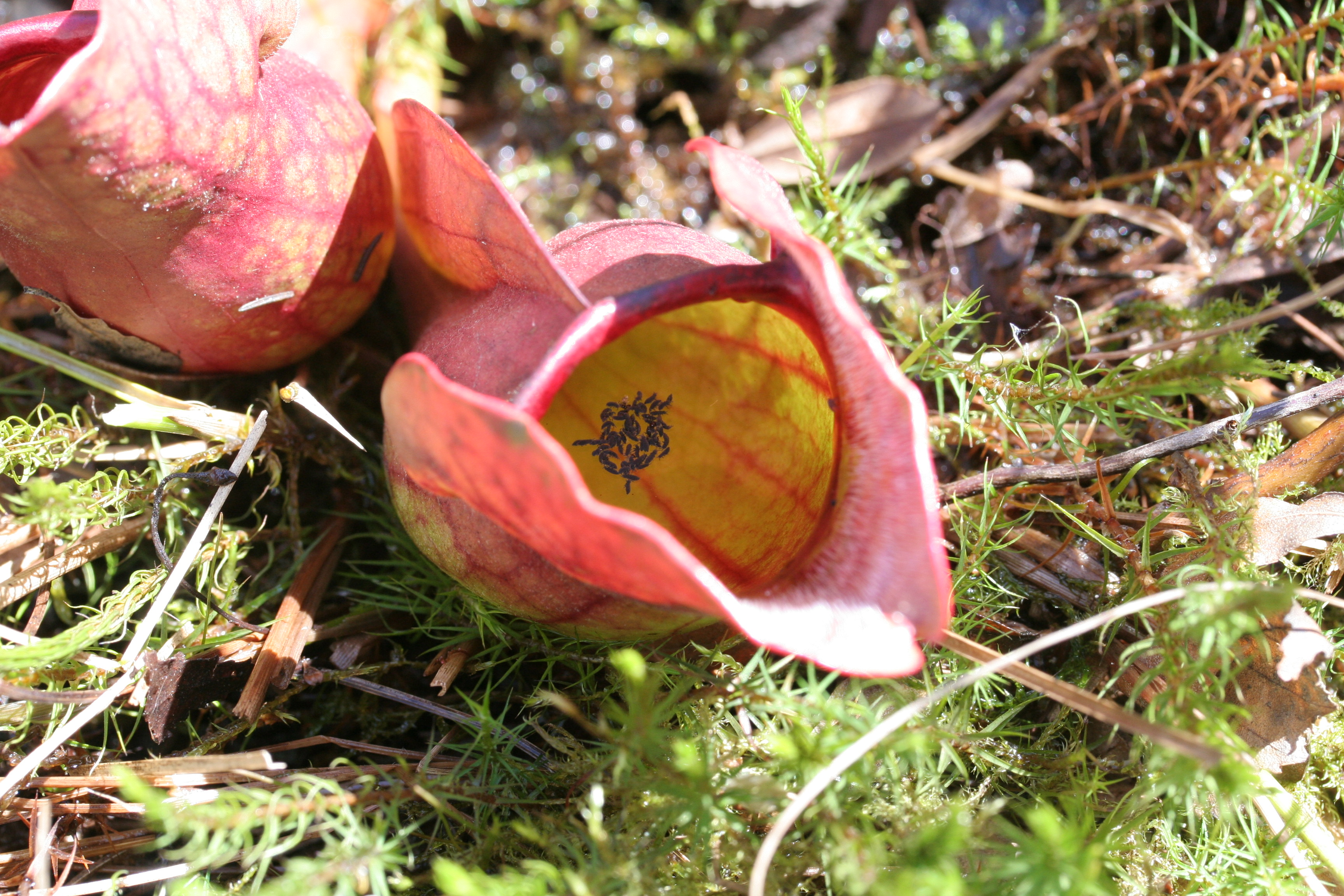
Sarracenia purpurea Linné. — Pitcher-plant.

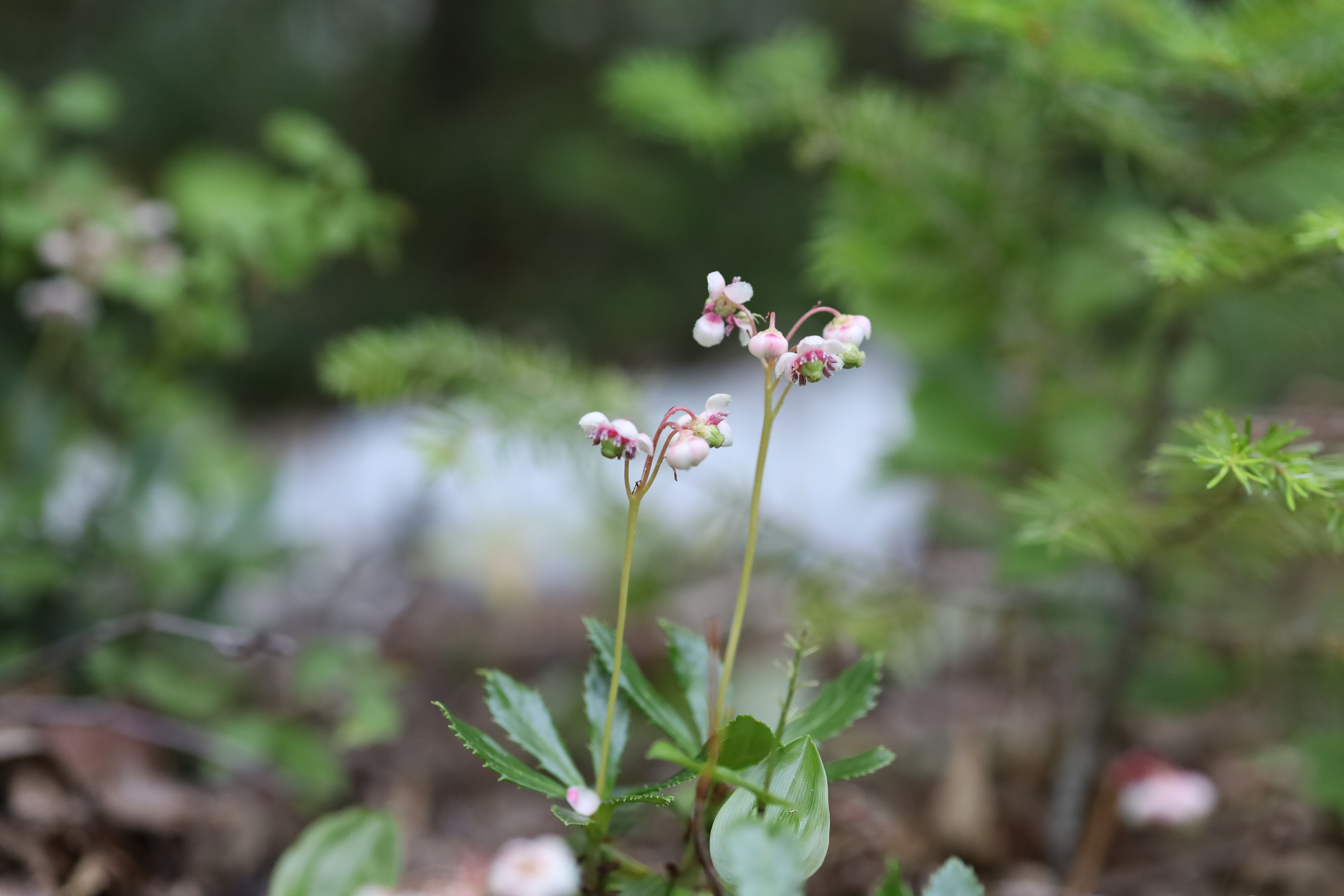
Chimaphila umbellata (Linné) Barton. — Prince's pine.

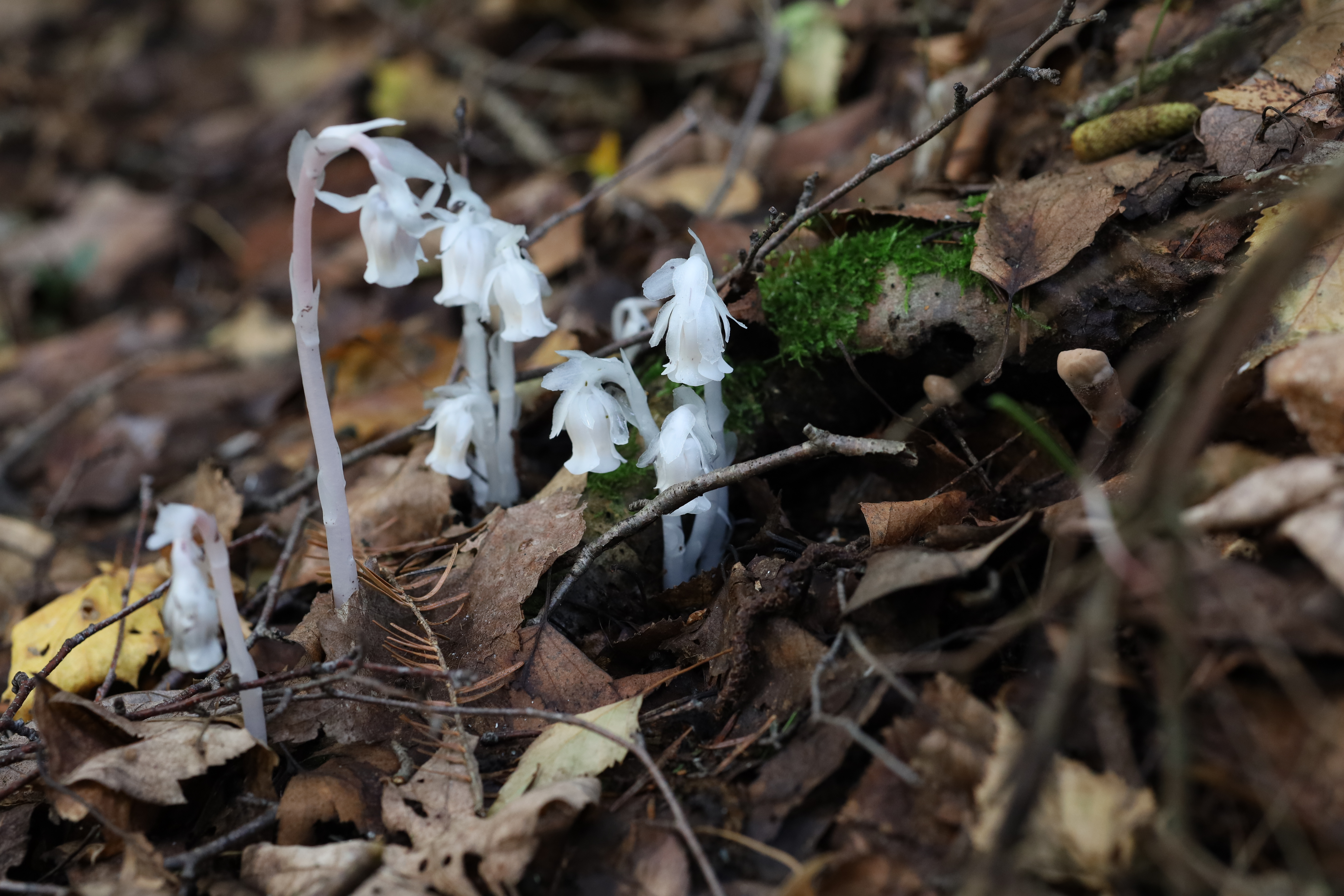
Monotropa uniflora Linné. — Indian-pipe.

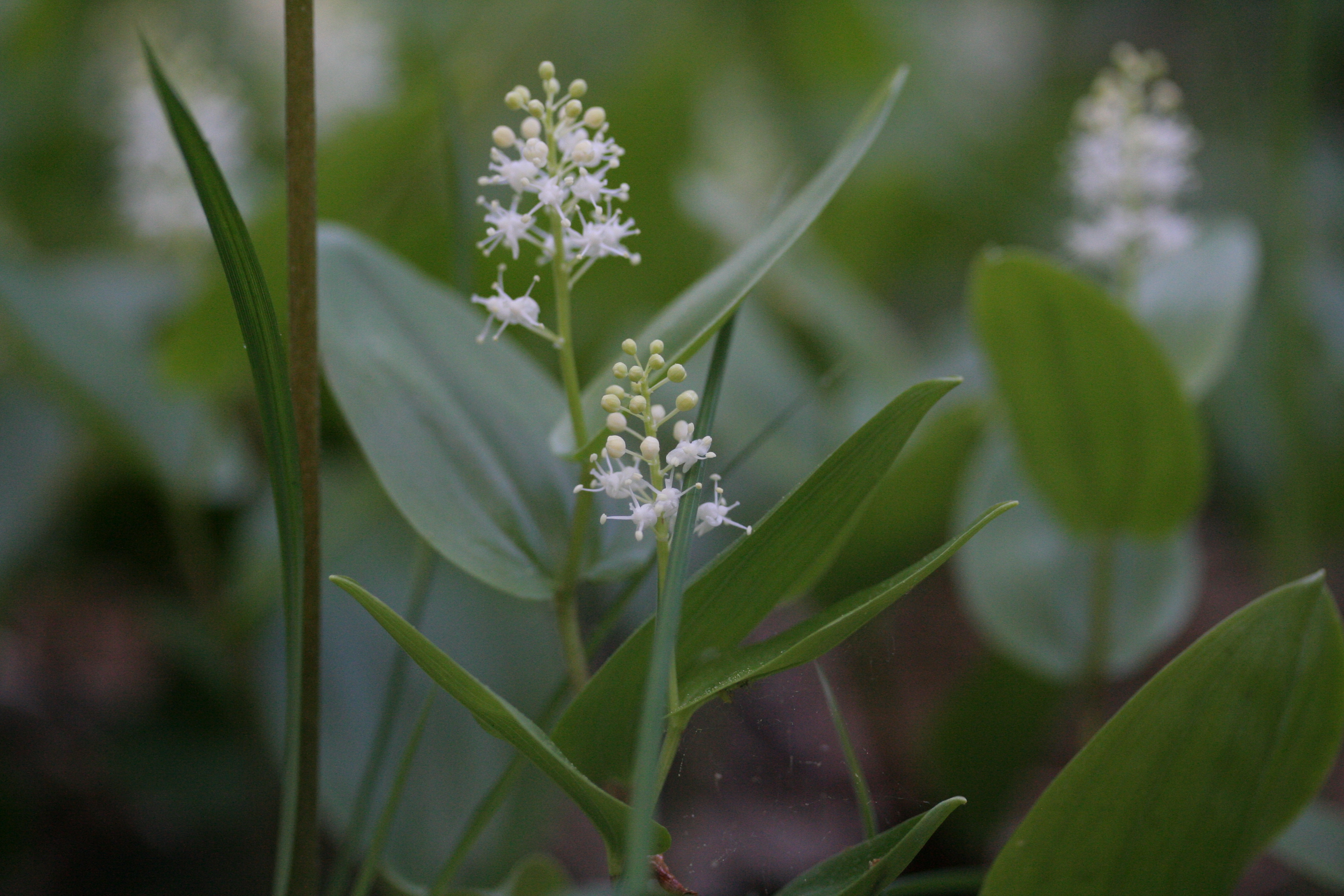
Maianthemum canadense Desfontaines. — Wild Lily-of-the-valley.

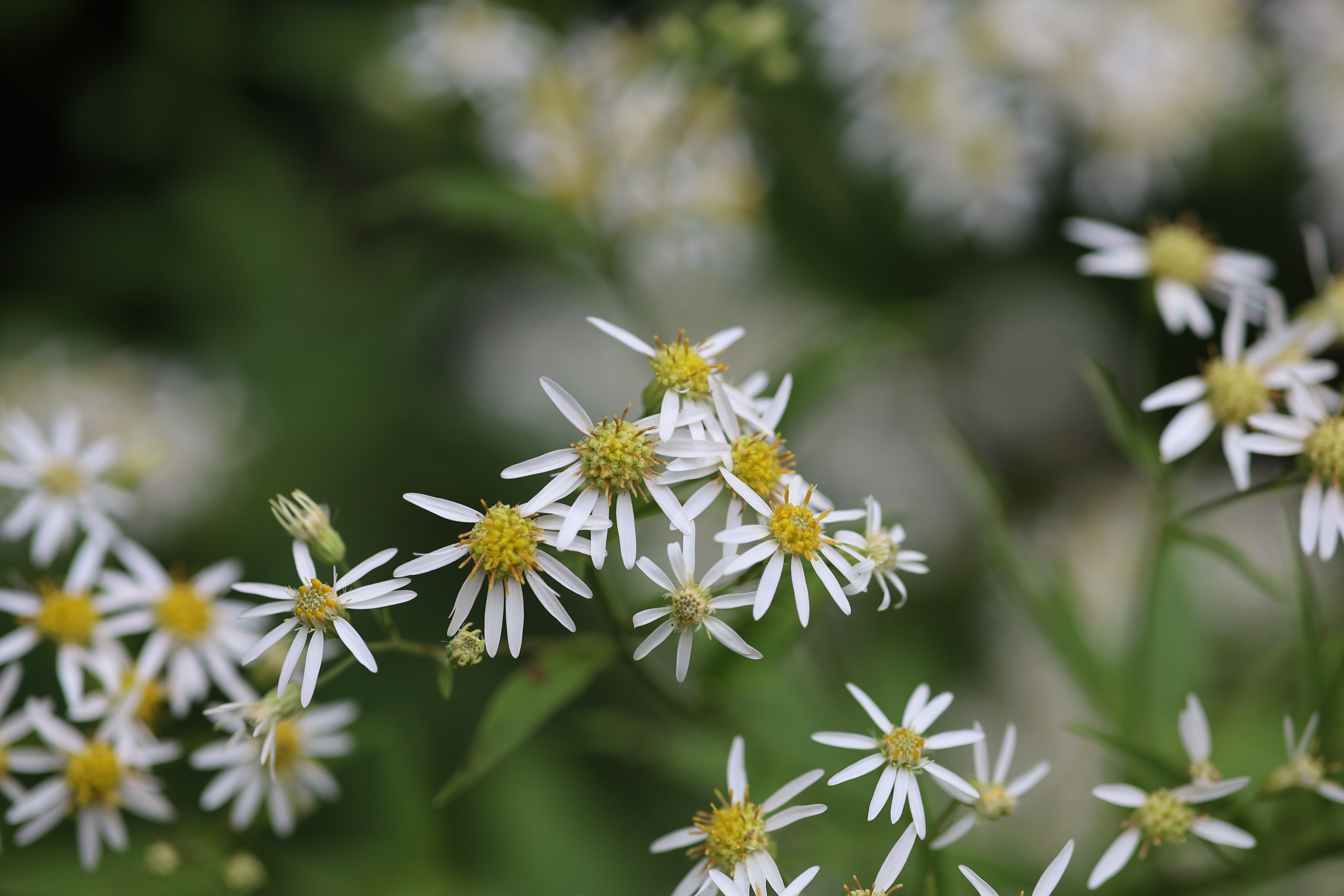
Aster umbellatus Miller. ― Umbellate aster.

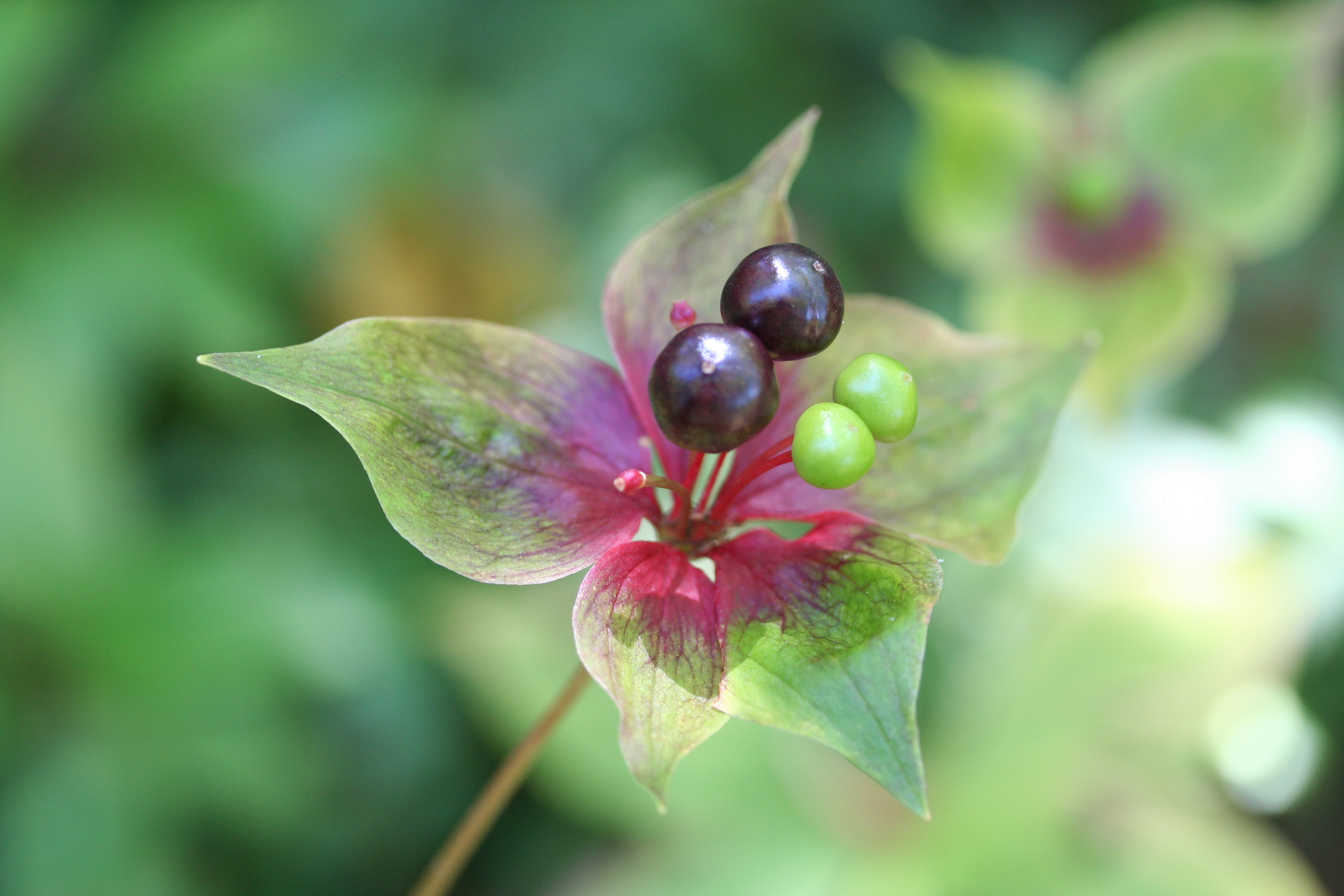
Medeola virginiana Linné. — Indian cucumber-root.
