= Presqu'île-Robillard Ecological Reserve =

Ecological reserve in Quebec, Canada

Coordinates: 45.5111°N 74.3175°W

- IUCN category Ia (strict nature reserve)
- Interactive map of Presqu'île-Robillard Ecological Reserve
- Location: Saint-André-d'Argenteuil, Argenteuil Regional County Municipality, Québec, Canada
- Established: May 17, 2000

Presqu'île-Robillard Ecological Reserve is an ecological reserve in Quebec, Canada. It was established on May 17, 2000.
