= Léon-Provancher Ecological Reserve =

- IUCN category Ia (strict nature reserve)
- Interactive map of Léon-Provancher Ecological Reserve
- Location: Bécancour, Bécancour Regional County Municipality, Québec, Canada
- Coordinates: 46.312°N 72.476°W
- Established: 1999

Léon-Provancher Ecological Reserve (Réserve écologique Léon-Provancher) is an ecological reserve of Quebec, Canada, established in 1999.
