= Bog-à-Lanières Ecological Reserve =

- IUCN category Ia (strict nature reserve)
- Interactive map of Bog-à-Lanières Ecological Reserve
- Location: Lac-Édouard, Agglomération de La Tuque, Mauricie, Québec, Canada
- Nearest city: Lac-Édouard
- Coordinates: 47.5928°N 72.2492°W
- Area: 4.33
- Established: April 8, 1992
- Governing body: Ministère de l'Environnement et de la Lutte contre les changements climatiques du Québec

Bog-à-Lanières Ecological Reserve is an ecological reserve of Quebec, Canada. The ecological reserve aims to ensure the protection of ombrotrophic peatlands in the Laurentians region. It is also one of the rare thong bog in Quebec.

== History ==
This Reserve was established on April 8, 1992 by a decree of the Government of Quebec.

== Toponymy ==
The name of the reserve comes from the scientific name of ombrotrophic peatland, a type of peatland fed only by precipitation or water table

== Geography ==
The reserve is located at Lac-Édouard, about sixty kilometres east of La Tuque.
