= Pointe-Heath Ecological Reserve =

Ecological reserve in Quebec, Canada

Coordinates: 49.1°N 61.7333°W

- IUCN category Ia (strict nature reserve)
- Interactive map of Pointe-Heath Ecological Reserve
- Location: L'Île-d'Anticosti (Anticosti Island), Minganie Regional County Municipality, Québec, Canada
- Established: March 22, 1978

Pointe-Heath Ecological Reserve is an ecological reserve in Quebec, Canada. It was established on March 22, 1978.
