= Tourbières-de-Lanoraie Ecological Reserve =

Coordinates: 45.9972°N 73.2958°W

- IUCN category Ia (strict nature reserve)
- Interactive map of Tourbières-de-Lanoraie Ecological Reserve
- Location: Lanoraie, D'Autray Regional County Municipality, Québec, Canada
- Established: 1994

Tourbières-de-Lanoraie Ecological Reserve is an ecological reserve in Quebec, Canada. It was established in 1994.
