= James-Little Ecological Reserve =

Ecological reserve in Quebec, Canada

Coordinates: 46.1889°N 77.6125°W

- IUCN category Ia (strict nature reserve)
- Interactive map of James-Little Ecological Reserve
- Location: Sheenboro, Pontiac Regional County Municipality, Québec, Canada
- Established: May 8, 1991

James-Little Ecological Reserve is an ecological reserve in Quebec, Canada. It was established on May 8, 1991.
