= Serpentine-de-Coleraine Ecological Reserve =

Ecological reserve in Quebec, Canada

Coordinates: 45.9903°N 71.3733°W

- IUCN category Ia (strict nature reserve)
- Interactive map of Serpentine-de-Coleraine Ecological Reserve
- Location: Saint-Joseph-de-Coleraine, Les Appalaches Regional County Municipality, Québec, Canada
- Established: April 30, 2003

Serpentine-de-Coleraine Ecological Reserve is an ecological reserve in Quebec, Canada. It was established on April 30, 2003.
