= Aigle-à-Tête-Blanche Ecological Reserve =

Ecological reserve in Canada

Coordinates: 46.2083°N 77.6764°W

- IUCN category Ia (strict nature reserve)
- Interactive map of Aigle-à-Tête-Blanche Ecological Reserve
- Location: Rapides-des-Joachims, Pontiac Regional County Municipality, Québec, Canada

Aigle-à-Tête-Blanche Ecological Reserve is an ecological reserve of Quebec, Canada. It was established on May 12, 1993.
