= Triassic–Jurassic extinction =

Mass extinction ending the Triassic period

The blue graph shows the apparent percentage (not the absolute number) of marine animal genera becoming extinct during any given time interval. It does not represent all marine species, just those that are readily fossilized. The labels of the traditional "Big Five" extinction events and the more recently recognised Capitanian mass extinction event are clickable links; see Extinction event for more details. (source and image info)

The Triassic–Jurassic (Tr-J) extinction event, often called the Triassic–Jurassic mass extinction (TJME) or end-Triassic extinction, marks the boundary between the Triassic and Jurassic periods, 201.4 million years ago. It represents one of five major extinction events during the Phanerozoic, profoundly affecting life on land and in the oceans.

In the seas, about 23–34% of marine genera disappeared; corals, bivalves, brachiopods, bryozoans, and radiolarians suffered severe losses of diversity and conodonts were completely wiped out, while marine vertebrates, gastropods, and benthic foraminifera were relatively unaffected. On land, all archosauromorph reptiles other than crocodylomorphs, dinosaurs, and pterosaurs became extinct. Crocodylomorphs, dinosaurs, pterosaurs, and mammals were left largely untouched, allowing them to become the dominant land animals for the next 135 million years. Plants were likewise significantly affected by the crisis, with floral communities undergoing radical ecological restructuring across the extinction event.

The cause of the TJME is generally considered to have been extensive volcanic eruptions in the Central Atlantic magmatic province (CAMP), a large igneous province whose emplacement released large amounts of carbon dioxide into the Earth's atmosphere, causing profound global warming and ocean acidification, and discharged immense quantities of toxic mercury into the environment. Older hypotheses have proposed that gradual changes in climate and sea levels may have been the cause, or perhaps one or more asteroid strikes.

== Research history ==
The earliest research on the TJME was conducted in the mid-20th century, when events in earth history were widely assumed to have been gradual, a paradigm known as uniformitarianism, while comparatively rapid cataclysms as causes of extinction events were dismissed as catastrophism, which had been associated with biblical creationism. Consequently, most researchers believed gradual environmental changes were the best explanation of the extinction; prominent vertebrate palaeontologist Edwin H. Colbert suggested gradual changes in the seasonality of rainfall and eustatic sea level rise that decreased the available land area above sea level were the culprit. In the 1980s, Jack Sepkoski identified the Triassic-Jurassic boundary drop in biodiversity as one of the "Big 5" mass extinction events. After the discovery that the Cretaceous-Paleogene extinction event was caused by an impact event, the TJME had also been suggested to have been caused by such an impact in the 1980s and 1990s. The theory that the TJME was caused by massive volcanism in the Central Atlantic magmatic province (CAMP) first emerged in the 1990s after similar research examining the Permian-Triassic extinction event found it to have been caused by volcanic activity and the emplacement of the CAMP was found to have occurred around the time of the Triassic-Jurassic transition. Despite some early objections, this paradigm remains the scientific consensus in the present day.

== Effects ==
=== Marine invertebrates ===
The Triassic–Jurassic extinction completed the transition from the Palaeozoic evolutionary fauna to the Modern evolutionary fauna that continues to dominate the oceans in the present, a change that began in the aftermath of the end-Guadalupian extinction and continued following the Permian-Triassic extinction event (PTME). Between 23% and 34.1% of marine genera went extinct. Plankton diversity dropped suddenly, but it was relatively mildly impacted at the Triassic-Jurassic boundary, although extinction rates among radiolarians rose significantly. Early Hettangian radiolarian communities became depauperate as a result of the TJME and consisted mainly of spumellarians and entactiniids. Benthic foraminifera suffered relatively minor losses of diversity. Some opportunistic foraminifera such as Triasina hantkeni increased in abundance as they thrived in oxygen-depleted waters. Ammonites were affected substantially by the Triassic–Jurassic extinction and were nearly wiped out. Ceratitidans, the most prominent group of ammonites in the Triassic, became extinct at the end of the Rhaetian after having their diversity reduced significantly in the Norian, while other ammonite groups such as the Ammonitina, Lytoceratina, and Phylloceratina diversified from the Early Jurassic onward. Bivalves suffered heavy losses, although the extinction was highly selective, with some bivalve clades escaping substantial diversity losses. The Lilliput effect, a term coined to describe a phenomenon wherein organisms shrink in size following a mass extinction, affected megalodontid bivalves, whereas file shell bivalves experienced the Brobdingnag effect, the reverse of the Lilliput effect. There is some evidence of a bivalve cosmopolitanism event during the mass extinction. Additionally, following the TJME, mobile bivalve taxa outnumbered stationary bivalve taxa. Gastropod diversity was barely affected at the Triassic-Jurassic boundary, although gastropods gradually suffered numerous losses over the late Norian and Rhaetian, during the leadup to the TJME. Brachiopods declined in diversity at the end of the Triassic before rediversifying in the Sinemurian and Pliensbachian; the dielasmatoid, athyridoid, and spondylospiroid brachiopods experienced particularly severe declines. Bryozoans, particularly taxa that lived in offshore settings, had already been in decline since the Norian and suffered further losses in the TJME. Ostracods also suffered significant losses, although opportunistic ostracod forms thrived in the eutrophic conditions of the TJME. Conulariids seemingly completely died out at the end of the Triassic. Around 96% of coral genera died out, with integrated corals being especially devastated. Corals practically disappeared from the Tethys Ocean at the end of the Triassic except for its northernmost reaches, resulting in an early Hettangian "coral gap". There is good evidence for a collapse in the reef community, which was likely driven by ocean acidification resulting from CO_{2} supplied to the atmosphere by the CAMP eruptions.

Most evidence points to a relatively fast recovery from the mass extinction. Benthic ecosystems recovered far more rapidly after the TJME than they did after the PTME. British Early Jurassic benthic marine environments display a relatively rapid recovery that began almost immediately after the end of the mass extinction despite numerous relapses into anoxic conditions during the earliest Jurassic. In the Neuquén Basin, recovery began in the late early Hettangian and lasted until a new biodiversity equilibrium in the late Hettangian. Also despite recurrent anoxic episodes, large bivalves began to reappear shortly after the extinction event. Siliceous sponges dominated the immediate aftermath interval thanks to the enormous influx of silica into the oceans, a consequence of the aerial extent of the CAMP basalts that were exposed to surficial weathering processes. In some regions, recovery was slow; in the northern Tethys, carbonate platforms in the TJME's aftermath became dominated by microbial carbonate producers and r-selected calcitic taxa such as Thaumatoporella parvovesiculifera, while dasycladacean algae did not reappear until the Sinemurian stage.

=== Marine vertebrates ===
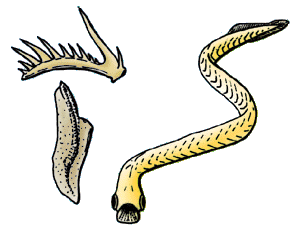
Conodonts were a major vertebrate group which died out at the end of the Triassic

Fish did not suffer a mass extinction at the end of the Triassic. The Late Triassic in general did experience a gradual drop in actinopterygiian diversity after an evolutionary explosion in the Middle Triassic. Though this may have been due to falling sea levels or the Carnian Pluvial Event, it may instead be a result of sampling bias considering that Middle Triassic fish have been more extensively studied than Late Triassic fish. Despite the apparent drop in diversity, neopterygiians (which include most modern bony fish) suffered less than more "primitive" actinopterygiians, indicating a biological turnover where modern groups of fish started to supplant earlier groups. Pycnodontiform fish were insignificantly affected. Conodonts, which were prominent index fossils throughout the Paleozoic and Triassic, finally became extinct at the T-J boundary following declining diversity.

Like fish, marine reptiles experienced a substantial drop in diversity between the Middle Triassic and the Jurassic. However, their extinction rate at the Triassic–Jurassic boundary was not elevated. The highest extinction rates experienced by Mesozoic marine reptiles actually occurred at the end of the Ladinian stage, which corresponds to the end of the Middle Triassic. The only marine reptile families which became extinct at or slightly before the Triassic–Jurassic boundary were the placochelyids (the last family of placodonts), making plesiosaurs the only surviving sauropterygians, and giant ichthyosaurs such as shastasaurids. Some authors have argued that the end of the Triassic acted as a genetic "bottleneck" for ichthyosaurs, which never regained the level of anatomical diversity and disparity which they possessed during the Triassic, although analysis of ichthyosaurian and eosauropterygian disparity across the Triassic-Jurassic transition has shown no evidence for such a bottleneck. The high diversity of rhomaelosaurids immediately after the TJME points to a gradual extinction of marine reptiles rather than an abrupt one.

=== Terrestrial animals ===
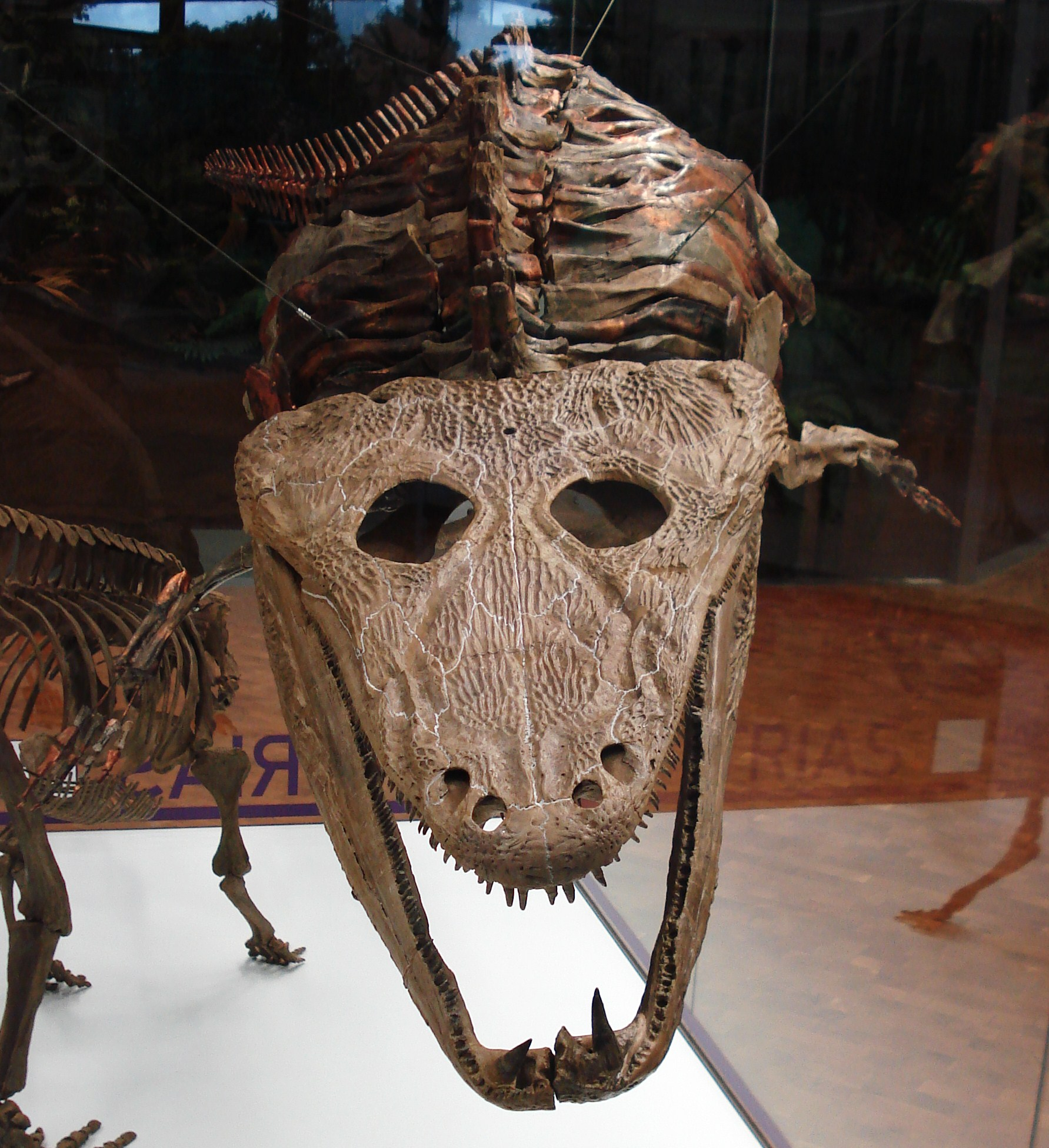
Capitosaurs (such as this Mastodonsaurus) were among the major amphibian groups which became extinct at the T–J boundary, though many may have died out earlier.

Terrestrial fauna was affected by the TJME much more severely than marine fauna. One of the earliest pieces of evidence for a Late Triassic extinction was a major turnover in terrestrial tetrapods such as amphibians, reptiles, and synapsids. Edwin H. Colbert drew parallels between the system of extinction and adaptation between the Triassic–Jurassic and Cretaceous–Paleogene boundaries. He recognized how dinosaurs, lepidosaurs (lizards and their relatives), and crocodyliforms (crocodilians and their relatives) filled the niches of more ancient groups of amphibians and reptiles which were extinct by the start of the Jurassic. Olsen (1987) estimated that 42% of all terrestrial tetrapods became extinct at the end of the Triassic, based on his studies of faunal changes in the Newark Supergroup of eastern North America. In contrast to the end-Cretaceous extinction, the TJME substantially affected freshwater ecosystems, and it further differed from the former in that body size did not affect extinction risk. More modern studies have debated whether the turnover in Triassic tetrapods was abrupt at the end of the Triassic, or instead more gradual.

During the Triassic, amphibians were mainly represented by large, crocodile-like members of the order Temnospondyli. Although the earliest lissamphibians (modern amphibians like frogs and salamanders) did appear during the Triassic, they would become more common in the Jurassic while the temnospondyls diminished in diversity past the Triassic–Jurassic boundary. Although the decline of temnospondyls did send shockwaves through freshwater ecosystems, it was probably not as abrupt as some authors have suggested. Brachyopoids, for example, survived until the Cretaceous according to new discoveries in the 1990s. Several temnospondyl groups did become extinct near the end of the Triassic despite earlier abundance, but it is uncertain how close their extinctions were to the end of the Triassic. The last known metoposaurids ("Apachesaurus") were from the Redonda Formation, which may have been early Rhaetian or late Norian. Gerrothorax, the last known plagiosaurid, has been found in rocks which are probably (but not certainly) Rhaetian, while a capitosaur humerus was found in Rhaetian-age deposits in 2018. Therefore, plagiosaurids and capitosaurs were likely victims of an extinction at the very end of the Triassic, while most other temnospondyls were already extinct.

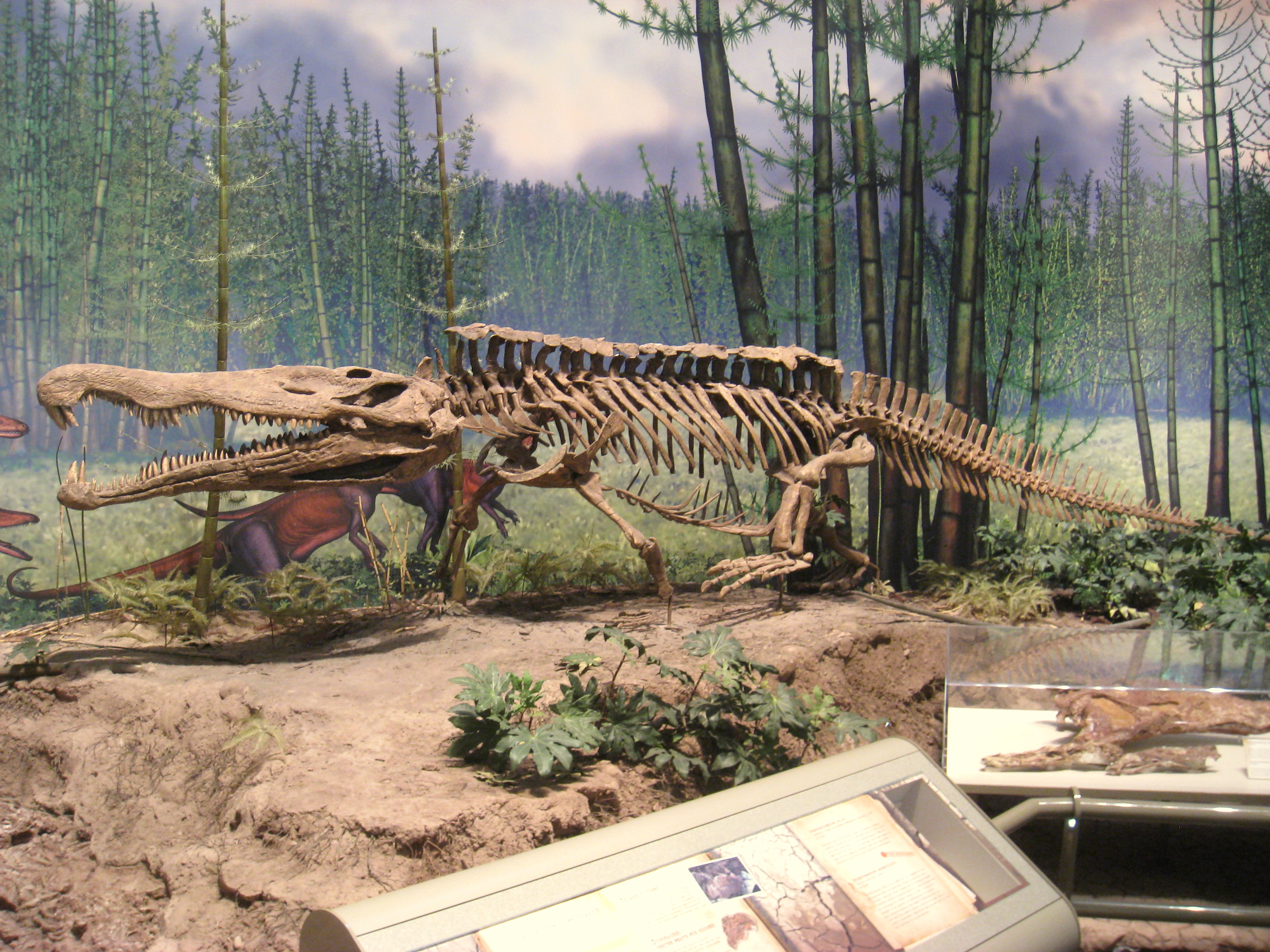
Reptile extinction at the end of the Triassic is poorly understood, but phytosaurs (such as this Redondasaurus) went from abundant to extinct by the end of the Rhaetian.

Terrestrial reptile faunas were dominated by archosauromorphs during the Triassic, particularly phytosaurs and members of Pseudosuchia (the reptile lineage which leads to modern crocodilians). In the Early Jurassic and onwards, dinosaurs and pterosaurs became the most common land reptiles, while small reptiles were mostly represented by lepidosauromorphs (such as lizards and tuatara relatives). Among pseudosuchians, only small crocodylomorphs did not become extinct by the end of the Triassic, with both dominant herbivorous subgroups (such as aetosaurs) and carnivorous ones (rauisuchids) having died out. Phytosaurs, drepanosaurs, trilophosaurids, tanystropheids, and procolophonids, which were other common reptiles in the Late Triassic, had also become extinct by the start of the Jurassic. However, pinpointing the extinction of these different land reptile groups is difficult, as the last stage of the Triassic, the Rhaetian, and the first stage of the Jurassic, the Hettangian, each have few records of large land animals; some paleontologists have considered only phytosaurs and procolophonids to have become extinct at the Triassic–Jurassic boundary, with other groups having become extinct earlier. However, it is likely that many other groups survived up until the boundary according to British fissure deposits from the Rhaetian. Aetosaurs, kuehneosaurids, drepanosaurs, thecodontosaurids, "saltoposuchids" (like Terrestrisuchus), trilophosaurids, and various non-crocodylomorph pseudosuchians are all examples of Rhaetian reptiles which may have become extinct at the Triassic–Jurassic boundary.

In the TJME's aftermath, dinosaurs experienced a major radiation, filling some of the niches vacated by the victims of the extinction. Crocodylomorphs likewise underwent a very rapid and major adaptive radiation, with surviving pseudosuchians being mostly ectothermic as the endothermic pseudosuchians died out during the TJME. Surviving non-mammalian synapsid clades similarly played a role in the post-TJME adaptive radiation during the Early Jurassic.

Herbivorous insects were minimally affected by the TJME; evidence from the Sichuan Basin shows they were overall able to quickly adapt to the floristic turnover by exploiting newly abundant plants. Odonates suffered highly selective losses, and their morphospace was heavily restructured as a result.

=== Terrestrial plants ===
The extinction event marks a floral turnover as well, with estimates of the percentage of Rhaetian pre-extinction plants being lost ranging from 17% to 73%. Though spore turnovers are observed across the Triassic-Jurassic boundary, the abruptness of this transition and the relative abundances of given spore types both before and after the boundary are highly variable from one region to another, pointing to a global ecological restructuring rather than a mass extinction of plants. Overall, plants suffered minor diversity losses on a global scale as a result of the extinction, but species turnover rates were high and substantial changes occurred in terms of relative abundance and growth distribution among taxa. Evidence from Central Europe suggests that rather than a sharp, very rapid decline followed by an adaptive radiation, a more gradual turnover in both fossil plants and spores with several intermediate stages is observed over the course of the extinction event. Extinction of plant species can in part be explained by the suspected increased carbon dioxide in the atmosphere as a result of CAMP volcanic activity, which would have created photoinhibition and decreased transpiration levels among species with low photosynthetic plasticity, such as the broad leaved Ginkgoales which declined to near extinction across the Tr–J boundary.

Ferns and other species with dissected leaves displayed greater adaptability to atmosphere conditions of the extinction event, and in some instances were able to proliferate across the boundary and into the Jurassic. The species Lepidopteris ottonis evolved a reliance on asexual reproduction amidst the environmental chaos of the TJME. In the Jiyuan Basin of North China, Classopolis content increased drastically in concordance with warming, drying, wildfire activity, enrichments in isotopically light carbon, and an overall reduction in floral diversity. In the Sichuan Basin, relatively cool mixed forests in the late Rhaetian were replaced by hot, arid fernlands during the Triassic–Jurassic transition, which in turn later gave way to a cheirolepid-dominated flora in the Hettangian and Sinemurian. The abundance of ferns in China that were resistant to high levels of aridity increased significantly across the Triassic–Jurassic boundary, though ferns better adapted for moist, humid environments declined, indicating that plants experienced major environmental stress, albeit not an outright mass extinction. In some regions, however, major floral extinctions did occur, with some researchers challenging the hypothesis of there being no significant floral mass extinction on this basis. Evidence from Jameson Land in East Greenland indicates that more than half of plant genera perished in the TJME. In the Newark Supergroup of the United States East Coast, about 60% of the diverse monosaccate and bisaccate pollen assemblages disappear at the Tr–J boundary, indicating a major extinction of plant genera. Early Jurassic pollen assemblages are dominated by Corollina, a new genus that took advantage of the empty niches left by the extinction. The site of St. Audrie's Bay displays a shift from diverse gymnosperm-dominated forests to Cheirolepidiaceae-dominated monocultures. The Danish Basin saw 34% of its Rhaetian spore-pollen assemblage, including Cingulizonates rhaeticus, Limbosporites lundbladiae, Polypodiisporites polymicroforatus, and Ricciisporites tuberculatus, disappear, with the post-extinction plant community being dominated by pinacean conifers such as Pinuspollenites minimus and tree ferns such as Deltoidospora, with ginkgos, cycads, cypresses, and corystospermous seed ferns also represented. Swedish assemblages show a low diversity flora consisting mainly of cheirolepids and gingkoaleans was present immediately after the TJME. Along the margins of the European Epicontinental Sea and the European shores of the Tethys, coastal and near-coastal mires fell victim to an abrupt sea level rise. These mires were replaced by a pioneering opportunistic flora after an abrupt sea level fall, although its heyday was short lived and it died out shortly after its rise. The opportunists that established themselves along the Tethyan coastline were primarily spore-producers. In the Eiberg Basin of the Northern Calcareous Alps, there was a very rapid palynomorph turnover. The palynological and palaeobotanical succession in Queensland shows a Classopolis bloom after the TJME. Polyploidy may have been an important factor that mitigated a conifer species' risk of going extinct.

== Possible causes ==
=== Central Atlantic Magmatic Province ===
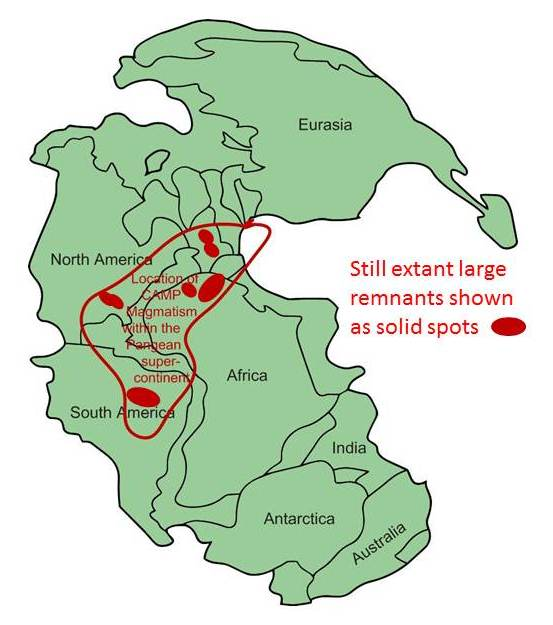
Maximum extent of CAMP volcanism at the Triassic-Jurassic boundary

The leading and best evidenced explanation for the TJME is massive volcanic eruptions, specifically from the Central Atlantic Magmatic Province (CAMP), the largest known large igneous province by area, and one of the most voluminous, with its flood basalts extending across parts of southwestern Europe, northwestern Africa, northeastern South America, and southeastern North America. The coincidence and synchrony of CAMP activity and the TJME is indicated by uranium–lead dating, argon-argon dating, and palaeomagnetism. The isotopic composition of fossil soils and marine sediments near the boundary between the Late Triassic and Early Jurassic has been tied to a large negative δ^{13}C excursion, with values as low as -2.8%. Carbon isotopes of hydrocarbons (n-alkanes) derived from leaf wax and lignin, and total organic carbon from two sections of lake sediments interbedded with the CAMP in eastern North America have shown carbon isotope excursions similar to those found in the mostly marine St. Audrie's Bay section, Somerset, England; the correlation suggests that the TJME began at the same time in marine and terrestrial environments, slightly before the oldest basalts in eastern North America but simultaneous with the eruption of the oldest flows in Morocco, with both a critical CO_{2} greenhouse and a marine biocalcification crisis. Furthermore, chemostratigraphic analysis in the Junggar Basin has shown that the negative δ^{13}C excursions associated with CAMP volcanism corresponded in time to biotic turnovers in the palynomorph record, strongly suggesting a causal relationship between the two. Contemporaneous CAMP eruptions, mass extinction, and the carbon isotopic excursions are shown in the same places, making the case for a volcanic cause of a mass extinction. The observed negative carbon isotope excursion is lower in some sites that correspond to what was then eastern Panthalassa because of the extreme aridity of western Pangaea limiting weathering and erosion there. The negative δ^{13}C excursion associated with CAMP volcanism lasted for approximately 20,000 to 40,000 years, or about one or two of Earth's axial precession cycles, although the carbon cycle was so disrupted that it did not stabilise until the Sinemurian. Mercury anomalies from deposits in various parts of the world have further bolstered the volcanic cause hypothesis, as have anomalies from various platinum-group elements. Nickel enrichments are also observed at the Triassic-Jurassic boundary coevally with light carbon enrichments, providing yet more evidence of massive volcanism.

Some scientists initially rejected the volcanic eruption theory because the Newark Supergroup, a section of rock in eastern North America that records the Triassic–Jurassic boundary, contains no ash-fall horizons and because its oldest basalt flows were estimated to lie around 10 m above the transition zone, which they estimated to have occurred 610 kyr after the TJME. Also among their objections was that the Triassic-Jurassic boundary was poorly defined and the CAMP eruptions poorly constrained temporally. However, updated dating protocol and wider sampling has confirmed that the CAMP eruptions started in Morocco only a few thousand years before the extinction, preceding their onset in Nova Scotia and New Jersey, and that they continued in several more pulses for the next 600,000 years. Volcanic global warming has also been criticised as an explanation because some estimates have found that the amount of carbon dioxide emitted was only around 250 ppm, not enough to generate a mass extinction. In addition, at some sites, changes in carbon isotope ratios have been attributed to diagenesis and not any primary environmental changes.

==== Global warming ====
The flood basalts of the CAMP released gigantic quantities of carbon dioxide, a potent greenhouse gas causing intense global warming. Before the TJME, carbon dioxide levels were around 1,000 ppm as measured by the stomatal index of Lepidopteris ottonis, but this quantity jumped to 1,300 ppm at the onset of the extinction event. During the TJME, carbon dioxide concentrations increased fourfold. The record of CAMP degassing shows several distinct pulses of carbon dioxide immediately following each major pulse of magmatism, at least two of which amount to a doubling of atmospheric CO_{2}. Carbon dioxide was emitted quickly and in enormous quantities compared to other periods of Earth's history, rate of carbon dioxide emissions was one of the most meteoric rises in carbon dioxide levels in Earth's entire history. It is estimated that a single volcanic pulse from the large igneous province would have emitted an amount of carbon dioxide roughly equivalent to projected anthropogenic carbon dioxide emissions for the 21st century. In addition, the flood basalts intruded through sediments that were rich in organic matter and combusted it, as evidenced by low Δ^{199}Hg values showing elevated levels of organic matter-derived mercury in the environment. The degassing of volatiles resulting from volcanic intrusions into organic-rich sediments further enhanced the volcanic warming of the climate. Thermogenic carbon release through such contact metamorphism of carbon-rich deposits has been found to be a sensible hypothesis providing a coherent explanation for the magnitude of the negative carbon isotope excursions at the terminus of the Triassic. Global temperatures rose sharply by 3 to 4 °C. In some regions, the temperature rise was as great as 10 °C. Kaolinite-dominated clay mineral spectra reflect the extremely hot and humid greenhouse conditions engendered by the CAMP. Soil erosion occurred as the hydrological cycle was accelerated by the extreme global heat.

The catastrophic dissociation of gas hydrates as a positive feedback resulting from warming, which has been suggested as one possible cause of the PTME, the largest mass extinction of all time, may have exacerbated greenhouse conditions, although others suggest that methane hydrate release was temporally mismatched with the TJME and thus not a cause of it.

==== Global cooling ====
Besides the carbon dioxide-driven long-term global warming, CAMP volcanism had shorter term cooling effects resulting from the emission of sulphur dioxide aerosols. The extremely voluminous emission of this gas caused sharp rises in Earth's albedo and induced severe volcanic winters. High latitudes had colder climates with evidence of mild glaciation during the extinction interval. Cold periods induced by volcanic ejecta clouding the atmosphere might have favoured endothermic animals, with dinosaurs, pterosaurs, and mammals being more capable at enduring these conditions than large pseudosuchians due to insulation.

==== Metal poisoning ====
CAMP volcanism released enormous amounts of toxic mercury. The appearance of high rates of mutagenesis of varying severity in fossil spores during the TJME coincides with mercury anomalies and is thus believed by researchers to have been caused by mercury poisoning. δ^{202}Hg and Δ^{199}Hg evidence suggests that volcanism caused the mercury loading directly at the Triassic-Jurassic boundary, but that there were later bouts of elevated mercury in the environment during the Early Jurassic caused by eccentricity-forced enhancement of hydrological cycling and erosion that resulted in remobilisation of volcanically injected mercury that had been deposited in wetlands.

==== Wildfires ====
The intense, rapid warming is believed to have resulted in increased storminess and lightning activity as a consequence of the more humid climate. The uptick in lightning activity is in turn implicated as a cause of an increase in wildfire activity. Coronene enrichments show an increase in wildfire activity closely temporally connected to biodiversity loss and pulses of acid rain associated with the TJME. Europe became plagued by continental scale wildfires blazing across its fern savannas. The combined presence of charcoal fragments and heightened levels of pyrolytic polycyclic aromatic hydrocarbons in Polish sedimentary facies straddling the Triassic-Jurassic boundary indicates wildfires were extremely commonplace during the earliest Jurassic, immediately after the Triassic-Jurassic transition. Elevated wildfire activity is also known from the Junggar Basin. In the Jiyuan Basin, two distinct pulses of drastically elevated wildfire activity are known: the first mainly affected canopies and occurred amidst relatively humid conditions while the second predominantly affected ground cover and was associated with aridity. At the Winterswijk quarry in the Netherlands, a surge in wildfire activity has been suggested to correspond to and have caused the sudden decline in coniferous vegetation. Frequent wildfires, combined with increased seismic activity from CAMP emplacement, led to apocalyptic soil degradation.

==== Anoxia and euxinia ====
Anoxia was another mechanism of extinction; the end-Triassic extinction was coeval with an uptick in black shale deposition and a pronounced negative δ^{238}U excursion, indicating a major decrease in marine oxygen availability. Additional evidence for anoxia during the TJME comes from pyrite framboids, which grow in anoxic conditions. Evidence of anoxia has been discovered at the Triassic-Jurassic boundary across the world's oceans; the western Tethys, eastern Tethys, and Panthalassa were all affected by a precipitous drop in seawater oxygen, although at a few sites, the TJME was associated with fully oxygenated waters. Positive δ^{15}N excursions have also been interpreted as evidence of anoxia concomitant with increased denitrification in marine sediments in the TJME's aftermath.

In northeastern Panthalassa, episodes of anoxia were already occurring during the Rhaetian before the TJME, making its marine ecosystems unstable even before the main crisis began. This early phase of environmental degradation in eastern Panthalassa may have been caused by an early phase of CAMP activity. Anoxic, reducing conditions were likewise present in western Panthalassa off the coast of what is now Japan for about a million years prior to the TJME. During the TJME, the rapid warming led to the stagnation of ocean circulation in many ocean regions, enabling the development of catastrophic anoxia; in what is now northwestern Europe, shallow seas became salinity stratified, enabling easy development of anoxia. Another factor contributing to anoxia was the increase in continental weathering driven by intense warming that delivered vast quantities of nutrients to the ocean surface and engendered eutrophication; this uptick in weathering is evidenced by positive δ^{56}Fe excursions. A combination of negative δ^{66}Zn excursions, positive δ^{26}Mg excursions, and a lack of significant change in δ^{65}Cu provides further evidence of increased chemical weathering resulting from increased temperature and humidity on land at high latitudes. Increased influx of terrestrial organic matter, in conjunction with reduced salinity, has been directly shown to have enkindled anoxia in the Eiberg Basin. Persistent low δ^{238}U ratios indicate prolonged global oxygen depletion continued into the Hettangian, with ^{87}Sr/^{86}Sr values showing that high influxes of terrestrial nutrients likely continued to eutrophicate the oceans well after the Triassic-Jurassic boundary. The persistence of anoxia into the Hettangian age may have helped delay the recovery of marine life in the extinction's aftermath.

Euxinia, a form of anoxia defined by not just the absence of dissolved oxygen but high concentrations of hydrogen sulphide, also developed in the oceans, as indicated by findings of increased isorenieratane. The increase in concentration of this substance reveals that populations of green sulphur bacteria, which photosynthesise using hydrogen sulphide instead of water, grew significantly across the Triassic-Jurassic boundary. A meteoric shift towards positive sulphur isotope ratios in reduced sulphur species indicates a complete utilisation of sulphate by sulphate reducing bacteria. Off the shores of the Wrangellia Terrane, the onset of photic zone euxinia was preceded by an interval of limited nitrogen availability and increased nitrogen fixation in surface waters while euxinia developed in bottom waters. Recurrent hydrogen sulphide poisoning following the TJME had retarding effects on biotic rediversification.

==== Ocean acidification ====
Oceanic uptake of volcanogenic carbon and sulphur dioxide would have led to a significant decrease of seawater pH known as ocean acidification, which is discussed as a relevant driver of marine extinction, acting in conjunction with marine anoxia. Additionally, acidification was enhanced and exacerbated by widespread photic zone euxinia, which caused increased rates of organic matter respiration and carbon dioxide release. Direct evidence of ocean acidification in the former of δ^{11}B ratios in fossil oysters is known from the TJME interval. Further evidence for ocean acidification as an extinction mechanism comes from the preferential extinction of marine organisms with thick aragonitic skeletons and little biotic control of biocalcification (e.g., corals, hypercalcifying sponges), which resulted in a coral reef collapse and an early Hettangian "coral gap". The decline of megalodontoid bivalves is also attributed to increased seawater acidity. Extensive fossil remains of malformed calcareous nannoplankton, a common sign of significant drops in pH, have also been extensively reported from the Triassic-Jurassic boundary. Global interruption of carbonate deposition at the Triassic-Jurassic boundary has been cited as additional evidence for catastrophic ocean acidification. Upwardly developing aragonite fans in the shallow subseafloor may also reflect decreased pH, these structures being speculated to have precipitated concomitantly with acidification. In some studied sections, the TJME biocalcification crisis is masked by emersion of carbonate platforms induced by marine regression.

==== Ozone depletion ====
Research on the role of ozone shield deterioration during the Permian-Triassic mass extinction has suggested that it may have been a factor in the TJME as well. A spike in the abundance of unseparated tetrads of Kraeuselisporites reissingerii has been interpreted as evidence of increased ultraviolet radiation flux resulting from ozone layer damage caused by volcanic aerosols.

=== Gradual climate change ===
The extinctions at the end of the Triassic were initially attributed to gradually changing environments. Within his 1958 study recognizing biological turnover between the Triassic and Jurassic, Edwin H. Colbert's proposal was that this extinction was a result of geological processes decreasing the diversity of land biomes. He considered the Triassic period to be an era of the world experiencing a variety of environments, from towering highlands to arid deserts to tropical marshes. In contrast, the Jurassic period was much more uniform both in climate and elevation due to excursions by shallow seas.

Later studies noted a clear trend towards increased aridification towards the end of the Triassic. Although high-latitude areas like Greenland and Australia actually became wetter, most of the world experienced more drastic changes in climate as indicated by geological evidence. This evidence includes an increase in carbonate and evaporite deposits (which are most abundant in dry climates) and a decrease in coal deposits (which primarily form in humid environments such as coal forests). In addition, the climate may have become much more seasonal, with long droughts interrupted by severe monsoons. The world gradually got warmer over this time as well; from the late Norian to the Rhaetian, mean annual temperatures rose by 7 to 9 °C. The site of Hochalm in Austria preserves evidence of carbon cycle perturbations during the Rhaetian preceding the Triassic-Jurassic boundary, potentially having a role in the ecological crisis.

=== Sea level fall ===
Geological formations in Europe and the Middle East seem to indicate a drop in sea levels at the end of the Triassic associated with the TJME. Although falling sea levels have sometimes been considered a culprit for marine extinctions, evidence is inconclusive since many sea level drops in geological history are not correlated with increased extinctions. However, there is still some evidence that marine life was affected by secondary processes related to falling sea levels, such as decreased oxygenation (caused by sluggish circulation), or increased acidification. These processes do not seem to have been worldwide, with the sea level fall observed in European sediments believed to be not global but regional, and with even some European sections showing no sign of sea level fall across the Triassic-Jurassic boundary, but they may explain local extinctions in European marine fauna. However, it is not universally accepted that even this local diversity drop was caused by sea level fall. A pronounced sea level change in latest Triassic records from Lake Williston in northeastern British Columbia, which was then the northeastern margin of Panthalassa, resulted in an extinction event of infaunal (sediment-dwelling) bivalves, though not epifaunal ones.

=== Extraterrestrial impact ===
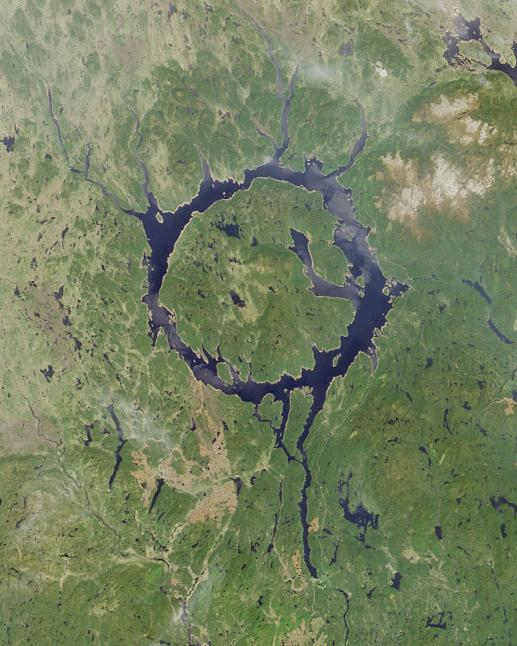
The Manicouagan reservoir in Quebec, a massive crater formed by a Late Triassic impact. Radiometric dating has determined that it is about 13 million years older than the Triassic–Jurassic boundary, and thus an unlikely candidate for a mass extinction.

Some have hypothesized that an impact from an asteroid or comet caused the Triassic–Jurassic extinction, similar to the extraterrestrial object which was the main factor in the Cretaceous–Paleogene extinction about 66 million years ago, as evidenced by the Chicxulub crater in Mexico. However, so far no impact crater of sufficient size has been dated to precisely coincide with the Triassic–Jurassic boundary.

Nevertheless, the Late Triassic did experience several impacts, including the second-largest confirmed impact in the Mesozoic. The Manicouagan Reservoir in Quebec is one of the most visible large impact craters on Earth, and at 100 km (62 mi) in diameter it is tied with the Eocene Popigai impact structure in Siberia as the fourth-largest impact crater on Earth. Olsen et al. (1987) were the first scientists to link the Manicouagan crater to the Triassic–Jurassic extinction, citing its age which at the time was roughly considered to be Late Triassic. More precise radiometric dating by Hodych & Dunning (1992) has shown that the Manicouagan impact occurred about 214 million years ago, about 13 million years before the Triassic–Jurassic boundary. Therefore, it could not have been responsible for an extinction precisely at the Triassic–Jurassic boundary. Nevertheless, the Manicouagan impact did have a widespread effect on the planet; a 214-million-year-old ejecta blanket of shocked quartz has been found in rock layers as far away as England and Japan. There is still a possibility that the Manicouagan impact was responsible for a small extinction midway through the Late Triassic at the Carnian–Norian boundary, although the disputed age of this boundary (and whether an extinction actually occurred in the first place) makes it difficult to correlate the impact with extinction. Onoue et al. (2016) alternatively proposed that the Manicouagan impact was responsible for a marine extinction in the middle of the Norian which affected radiolarians, sponges, conodonts, and Triassic ammonoids. Thus, the Manicouagan impact may have been partially responsible for the gradual decline in the latter two groups which culminated in their extinction at the Triassic–Jurassic boundary. The boundary between the Adamanian and Revueltian land vertebrate faunal zones, which involved extinctions and faunal changes in tetrapods and plants, was possibly also caused by the Manicouagan impact, although discrepancies between magnetochronological and isotopic dating lead to some uncertainty.

Other Triassic craters are closer to the Triassic–Jurassic boundary but also much smaller than the Manicouagan reservoir. The eroded Rochechouart impact structure in France has most recently been dated to 201±2 million years ago, but at 25 km (16 mi) across (possibly up to 50 km (30 mi) across originally), it appears to be too small to have affected the ecosystem, although it has been speculated to have played a role in an alleged much smaller extinction event at the Norian-Rhaetian boundary. The 40 km (25 mi) wide Saint Martin crater in Manitoba has been proposed as a candidate for a possible TJME-causing impact, but it has since been dated to be Carnian. Other putative or confirmed Triassic craters include the 80 km (50 mi) wide Puchezh-Katunki crater in Eastern Russia (though it may be Jurassic in age), the 15 km (9 mi) wide Obolon' crater in Ukraine, and the 9 km (6 mi) wide Red Wing Creek structure in North Dakota. Spray et al. (1998) noted an interesting phenomenon, that being how the Manicouagan, Rochechouart, and Saint Martin craters all seem to be at the same latitude, and that the Obolon' and Red Wing craters form parallel arcs with the Rochechouart and Saint Martin craters, respectively. Spray and his colleagues hypothesized that the Triassic experienced a "multiple impact event", a large fragmented asteroid or comet which broke up and impacted the earth in several places at the same time. Such an impact has been observed in the present day, when Comet Shoemaker-Levy 9 broke up and hit Jupiter in 1992. However, the "multiple impact event" hypothesis for Triassic impact craters has not been well-supported; Kent (1998) noted that the Manicouagan and Rochechouart craters were formed in eras of different magnetic polarity, and radiometric dating of the individual craters has shown that the impacts occurred millions of years apart.

Shocked quartz has been found in Rhaetian deposits from the Northern Apennines of Italy, providing possible evidence of an end-Triassic extraterrestrial impact. Certain trace metals indicative of a bolide impact have been found in the late Rhaetian, though not at the Triassic-Jurassic boundary itself; the discoverers of these trace metal anomalies purport that such a bolide impact could only have been an indirect cause of the TJME. The discovery of seismites two to four metres thick coeval with the carbon isotope fluctuations associated with the TJME has been interpreted as evidence of a possible bolide impact, although no definitive link between these seismites and any impact event has been found.

On the other hand, the dissimilarity between the isotopic perturbations characterising the TJME and those characterising the end-Cretaceous mass extinction makes an extraterrestrial impact highly unlikely to have been the cause of the TJME, according to many researchers. Various trace metal ratios, including palladium/iridium, platinum/iridium, and platinum/rhodium, in rocks deposited during the TJME have numerical values very different from what would be expected in an extraterrestrial impact scenario, providing further evidence against this hypothesis. The Triassic-Jurassic boundary furthermore lacks a fern spore spike akin to that observed at the terminus of the Cretaceous, inconsistent with an asteroid impact.

== Comparisons to present climate change ==
The extremely rapid, centuries-long timescale of carbon emissions and global warming caused by pulses of CAMP volcanism has drawn comparisons between the Triassic-Jurassic mass extinction and anthropogenic global warming, currently causing the Holocene extinction. The current rate of carbon dioxide emissions is around 50 gigatonnes per year, hundreds of times faster than during the latest Triassic, although the lack of extremely detailed stratigraphic resolution and pulsed nature of CAMP volcanism means that individual pulses of greenhouse gas emissions likely occurred on comparable timescales to human release of warming gases since the Industrial Revolution. The degassing rate of the first pulse of CAMP volcanism is estimated to have been around half of the rate of modern anthropogenic emissions. Palaeontologists studying the TJME and its impacts warn that a major reduction in humanity's carbon dioxide emissions to slow down climate change is of critical importance for preventing a catastrophe similar to the TJME from befalling the modern biosphere. If human-induced climate change persists as is, predictions can be made as to how various aspects of the biosphere will respond based on records of the TJME. For example, current conditions such the increased carbon dioxide levels, ocean acidification, and ocean deoxygenation create a similar climate to that of the Triassic-Jurassic boundary for marine life, so it is the common assumption that should the trends continue, modern reef-building taxa and skeletal benthic organisms will be preferentially impacted. The end-Triassic reef crisis has been specifically cited as a possible analogue for the fate of present coral reefs should anthropogenic global warming continue.

== Literature ==
- Hodych, J. P.; G. R. Dunning (1992). "Did the Manicougan impact trigger end-of-Triassic mass extinction?". Geology. 20 (1): 51–54. Bibcode:1992Geo....20...51H. doi:10.1130/0091-7613(1992)020<0051:DTMITE>2.3.CO;2.
- McElwain, J. C.; D. J. Beerling; F. I. Woodward (27 August 1999). "Fossil Plants and Global Warming at the Triassic–Jurassic Boundary". Science. 285 (5432): 1386–1390. doi:10.1126/science.285.5432.1386. PMID 10464094.
- McHone, J.G. (2003), Volatile emissions of Central Atlantic Magmatic Province basalts: Mass assumptions and environmental consequences, in Hames, W.E. et al., eds., The Central Atlantic Magmatic Province: Insights from Fragments of Pangea. American Geophysical Union Monograph 136, p. 241–254.
- Tanner, L.H.; S.G. Lucas; M.G. Chapman (2004). "Assessing the record and causes of Late Triassic extinctions". Earth-Science Reviews. 65 (1–2): 103–139. Bibcode:2004ESRv...65..103T. doi:10.1016/S0012-8252(03)00082-5.
- Whiteside, Jessica H.; Paul E. Olsen; Timothy Eglinton; Michael E. Brookfield; Raymond N. Sambrotto (22 March 2010). "Compound-specific carbon isotopes from Earth's largest flood basalt eruptions directly linked to the end-Triassic mass extinction". Proceedings of the National Academy of Sciences of the United States of America. 107 (15): 6721–5. Bibcode:2010PNAS..107.6721W. doi:10.1073/pnas.1001706107. PMC 2872409. PMID 20308590.
- Deenen, M.H.L.; M. Ruhl; N.R. Bonis; W. Krijgsman; W. Kuerscher; M. Reitsma; M.J. van Bergen (2010). "A new chronology for the end-Triassic mass extinction". Earth and Planetary Science Letters. 291 (1–4): 113–125. Bibcode:2010E&PSL.291..113D. doi:10.1016/j.epsl.2010.01.003.
- Hautmann, M. (2012). "Extinction: End-Triassic Mass Extinction". eLS. John Wiley & Sons, Ltd: Chichester. doi:10.1002/9780470015902.a0001655.pub3. ISBN 978-0-470-01617-6. S2CID 130434497.
- Tetsuji Onoue; Honami Sato; Daisuke Yamashita; Minoru Ikehara; Kazutaka Yasukawa; Koichiro Fujinaga; Yasuhiro Kato; Atsushi Matsuoka (8 July 2016). "Bolide impact triggered the Late Triassic extinction event in equatorial Panthalassa". Scientific Reports. 6 29609. Bibcode:2016NatSR...629609O. doi:10.1038/srep29609. PMC 4937377. PMID 27387863.
