= Obolon =

Obolon is an Eastern European name for floodplain meadows.

- Obolon, Kyiv (Оболонь) is a historical locality and a neighbourhood of Ukraine's capital Kyiv

The names of the following are derived from the name of the Obolon neighbourhood:

- Obolonskyi District, an urban district of Ukraine's capital city, Kyiv
- Obolon (company), the largest Ukrainian brewer
- FC Obolon Kyiv, a soccer club based in Kyiv
- Obolon (Kyiv Metro), a metro station

== See also ==
- Obolon' crater, a meteorite impact crater in Ukraine
- Obolon, Poltava Oblast, a village
