= Seignelay River =

- Manicouagan Reservoir in winter. Mouchalagane (west) and Seignelay (east) combine to enter the northwest of the reservoir.

- Location within Quebec Location within Canada
- Native name: Rivière Seignelay (French)

Location
- Country: Canada
- Province: Quebec
- Region: Côte-Nord

Physical characteristics
- Mouth
  - location: Manicouagan Reservoir
  - coordinates: 51°36′49″N 69°3′55″W

Basin features
- River system: Manicouagan River

The Seignelay River (French: Rivière Seignelay) is a river of the Côte-Nord region of Quebec.

== Location ==
The Seignelay River Rises to the south of Lac Vallard. It flows through the unorganized territory of Rivière-Mouchalagane in Caniapiscau, Quebec. Its course is almost due south. It is one of the major inlets to the Manicouagan Reservoir, along with the Mouchalagane, Hart Jaune, Themines and Petite Riviere Manicouagan. Previous names included Rivière Cawiwanipis, Rivière Kawikwanipinis, Rivière Mistinic and Rivière Mistinik. As of November 2021 the Commission de toponymie du Québec had not determined the origin or meaning of the present name.

== Hydrology ==
The Seignelay River rises in terrain with an altitude of about 750 metres (2,460 ft). It is the outlet of Lac Mistinic. It has a length of 132 kilometres (82 mi) and drains an area of 3,263 square kilometres (1,260 sq mi). The mean discharge is 71 cubic metres per second (2,500 cu ft/s).

== Kankakee River ==
In December 1679 Réné-Robert Cavelier, later known as the Sieur de La Salle, found a river that rose not far from the south bend of St. Joseph River, a tributary of Lake Michigan and flowed southwest He named it the Fleuve Seignelay (Seignelay River) after Jean-Baptiste Colbert, Marquis de Seignelay, the French minister of the navy and colonies. The river continued southwest to join the Des Plaines River and form the Illinois River, a tributary of the Mississippi River. It thus provided an important section of the route from Quebec to the Mississippi and the Great Plains. This "Seignelay River" was renamed Theakiki River before taking its present name of Kankakee River.

== Sources ==
- Johnson, Vic (2006), Bourbonnais, Arcadia Publishing, pp. 127 pages, ISBN 9780738540962
- "Relation: Rivière Seignelay (11895060)", OpenStreetMap
- "Rivière Seignelay", CGNDB: Canadian Geographical Names Database, Government of Canada
- Rivière Seignelay, Québec Commission de toponymie
- "TNO Rivière-Mouchalagane", GrandQuebec
