= Seignelay (disambiguation) =

Seignelay is a commune in the Yonne department in Bourgogne-Franche-Comté in north-central France.

Seignelay may also refer to:

- Jean-Baptiste Colbert, Marquis de Seignelay (1651–1690), French politician
- Seignelay River, river of the Côte-Nord region of Quebec, Canada
- Seignelay River, former name of the Kankakee River in Illinois, United States
- Seignelay, a French Navy armoured cruiser, named after the Marquis de Seignelay
