= Omeonga =

Settlement in Sankuru, DRC

Coordinates: 03°28′0″S 24°24′0″E

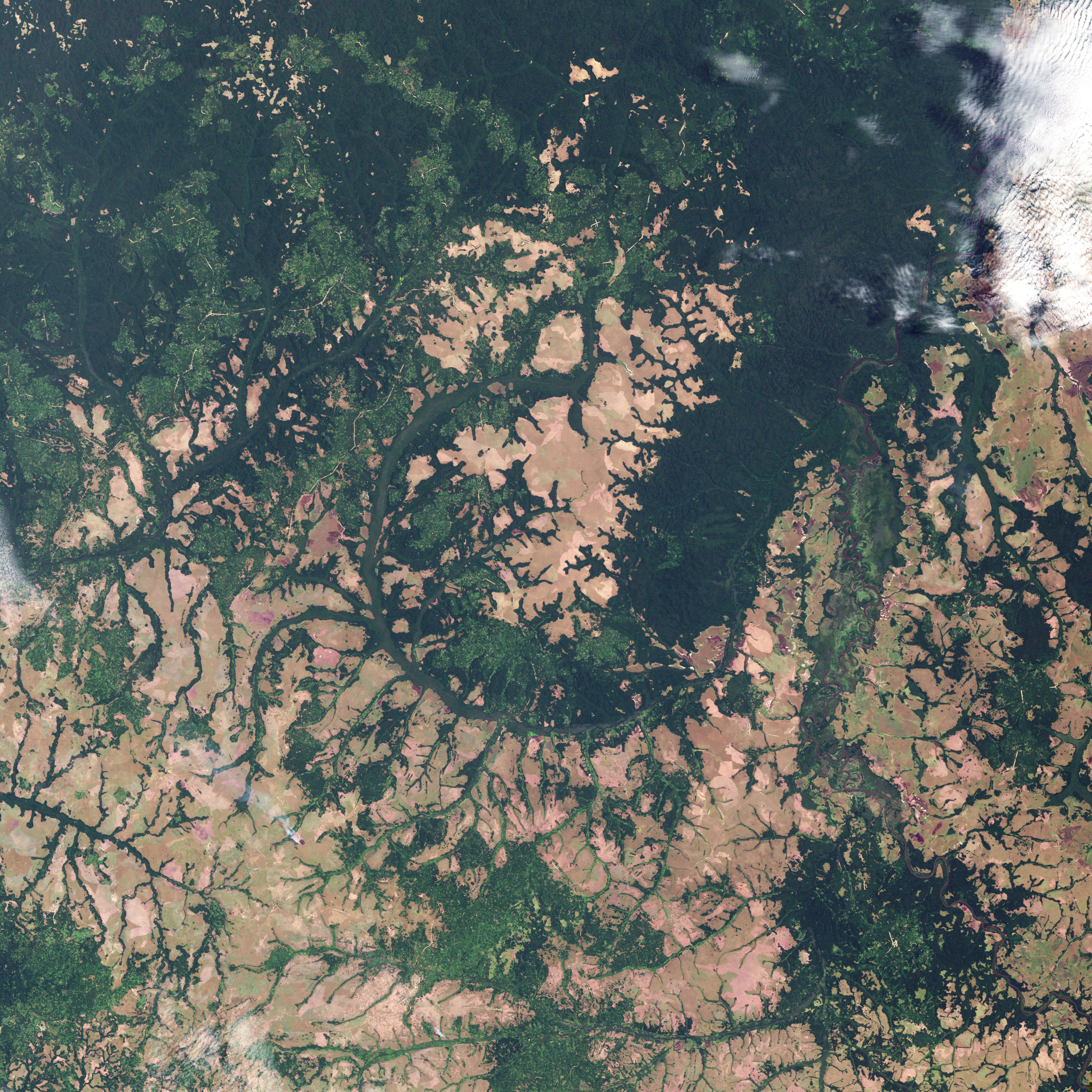
Wembo-Nyama Feature, DR Congo 2000-04-01 lrg

Omeonga is a town in the Sankuru province of the Democratic Republic of the Congo. It lies around 25 miles (40 km) south southeast of the nearest large town, Katako-Kombe. The Lomami river also passes nearby.

Chiefs or possessors of the name Omeonga are considered noble. It is also a name meaning "Man of Pillars" or "Noble".

== Impact structure ==
The town lies near the center of a 30 km diameter depression, which is a proposed but unconfirmed ancient impact structure called the "Wembo-Nyama ring structure". The roundness of the ring is underlined by a tributary of the Lomami river. A similar visual effect can be seen with Manicouagan impact structure in central Quebec, Canada, where a ring of water surrounds the central René-Levasseur Island.

== See also ==
- Siljan Ring
- List of possible impact structures on Earth
