= Mount Babel (Quebec) =

Mountain in Quebec, Canada

- Mont Babel
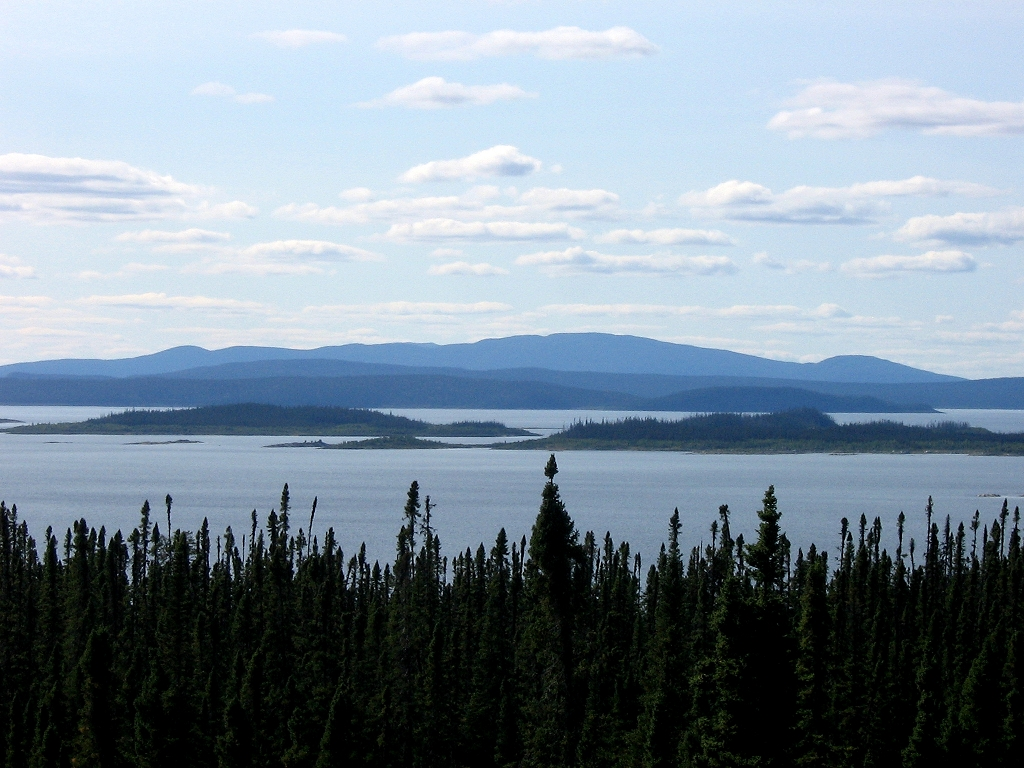
- View from the east of Mount Babel (right of centre), René-Levasseur Island, and the Manicouagan Reservoir.

Highest point
- Elevation: 952 m (3,123 ft)
- Prominence: 590 m (1,940 ft)
- Listing: List of mountains of Canada
- Coordinates: 51°26′28″N 68°41′31″W

Geography
- Location within Quebec
- Location: Rivière-aux-Outardes, Quebec, Canada
- Topo map: NTS 22N7 Mont de Babel

Mount Babel is the highest peak of the René-Levasseur Island, at 952 m (3,123 ft) above sea-level, which is 590 m (1,936 ft) above the Manicouagan Reservoir level. It lies within the Louis-Babel Ecological Reserve in Quebec, Canada.

== History ==
The mount is named after Catholic missionary Louis Babel (1829–1912), who is said to have converted Montagnais and Naskapis.

Mount Babel is the central peak of the Manicouagan impact structure and was formed by the rebound of the crust after the impact of a meteor 210 million years ago. The mountain and reservoir are of particular interest to geologists due to the shock metamorphosis it endured.

== Biodiversity ==
Mount Babel is a valuable research ground for biologists. One can find montane and alpine climate zones there, since meteorological conditions become increasingly extreme towards the summit. These conditions create a quick transition from boreal forest to tundra, where there can be found lichen and other arctic life forms that would normally be observed hundreds of kilometres farther north.
