= Mount Babel =

Mount Babel may refer to summits in Canada:

== In Canada ==
Name	CGNDB link	Province	Region	NTS map	Coordinates	Elevation	
Mount Babel		Alberta	Bow Range	082N08	51°18′23″N 116°9′48″W	3,101 m	10,174 ft
Mount Babel		Quebec	Île René-Levasseur	022N07	51°26′28″N 68°41′31″W	952 m	3,123 ft
