= Manicouagan River =

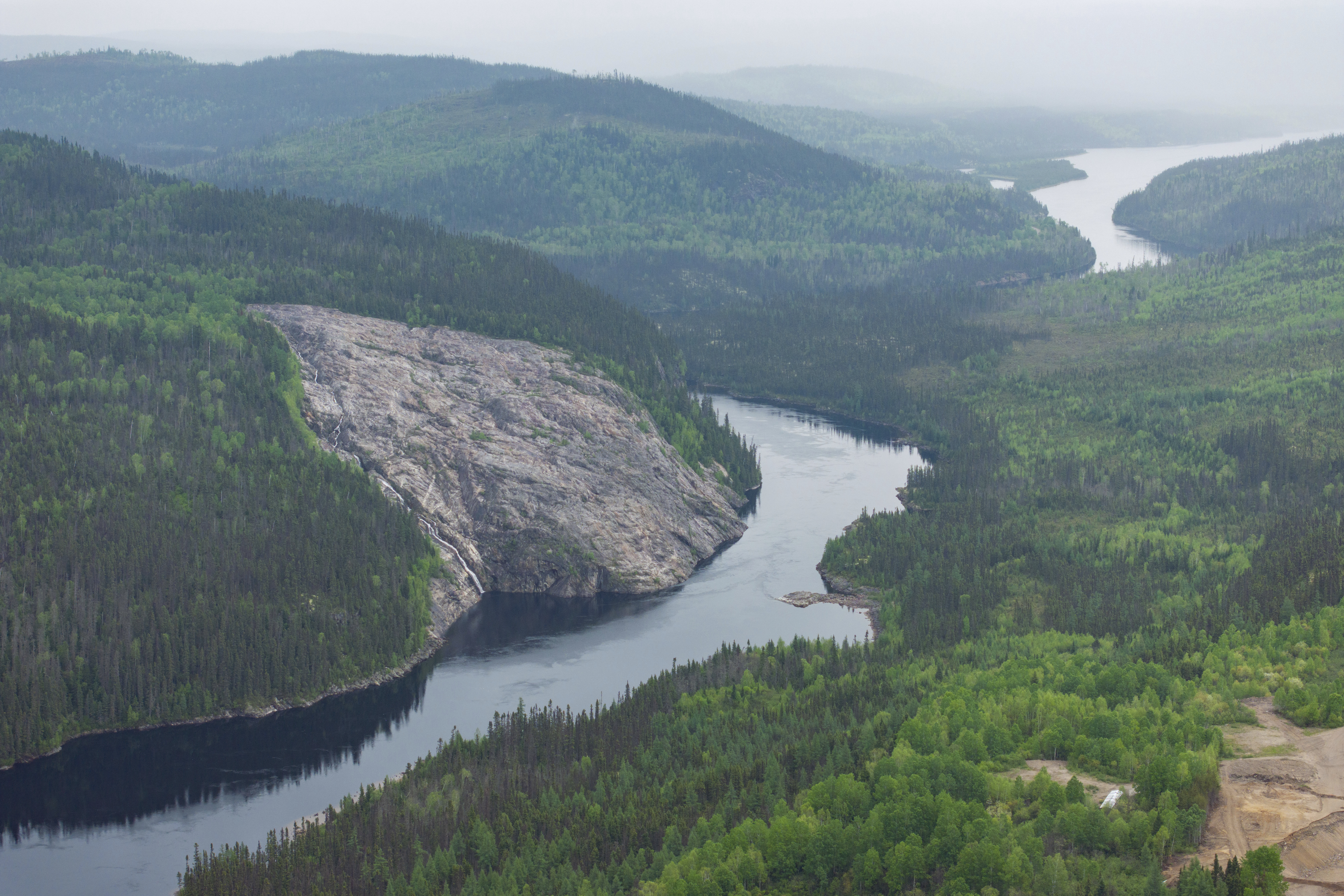
- Manicouagan River near the Daniel-Johnson dam

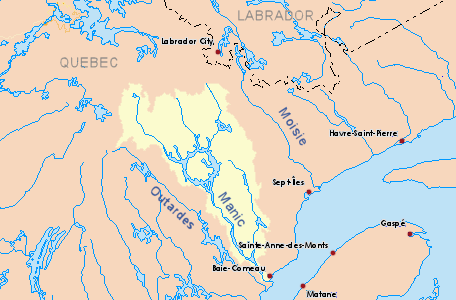
- Drainage basin in yellow

Location
- Country: Canada
- Province: Quebec
- Region: Côte-Nord

Physical characteristics
- Source: Manicouagan Reservoir
  - location: Rivière-aux-Outardes
  - coordinates: 50°38′53″N 68°43′40″W
- Mouth: Gulf of Saint Lawrence
  - location: Pointe-Lebel
  - coordinates: 49°10′34″N 68°11′40″W
  - elevation: 0 m (0 ft)
- Length: 200 km (120 mi)
- Basin size: 45,800 km^{2} (17,700 sq mi)
- Discharge
  - average: 1,020 m^{3}/s (36,000 cu ft/s)

Basin features
- Tributaries
  - right: Toulnustouc River

The Manicouagan or Manicuagan River, often clipped to Manic, is a river in Côte-Nord region of Quebec, Canada. The river originates in the Manicouagan Reservoir and flows approximately 200 kilometres (120 mi) south, emptying into the Saint Lawrence River near Baie-Comeau. The reservoir, also known as Lake Manicouagan, lies within the remnant of an ancient eroded impact crater (astrobleme). It was formed following the impact of a 5-kilometre-diameter (3.1 mi) asteroid which excavated a crater originally about 100 km (62 mi) wide, although erosion and deposition of sediments have since reduced the visible diameter to about 72 km (45 mi). The Manicouagan impact structure is the sixth-largest confirmed impact crater known on earth.

== Name ==
The river's name is believed to come from a Montagnais name meaning "Place where Tree Bark is Found". However the Innu of Betsiamites call it Menukuanistuk Shipu, meaning "River of the Cup".

== Tributaries ==
The major tributaries of the Manicouagan River are in upstream order:

- Toulnustouc River
  - Isoukustouc River
  - Fontmarais River
- Lemay River
- Manicouagan Reservoir
  - Mouchalagane River
  - Seignelay River
  - Hart Jaune River
  - Themines River
  - Petite Riviere Manicouagan

== History ==
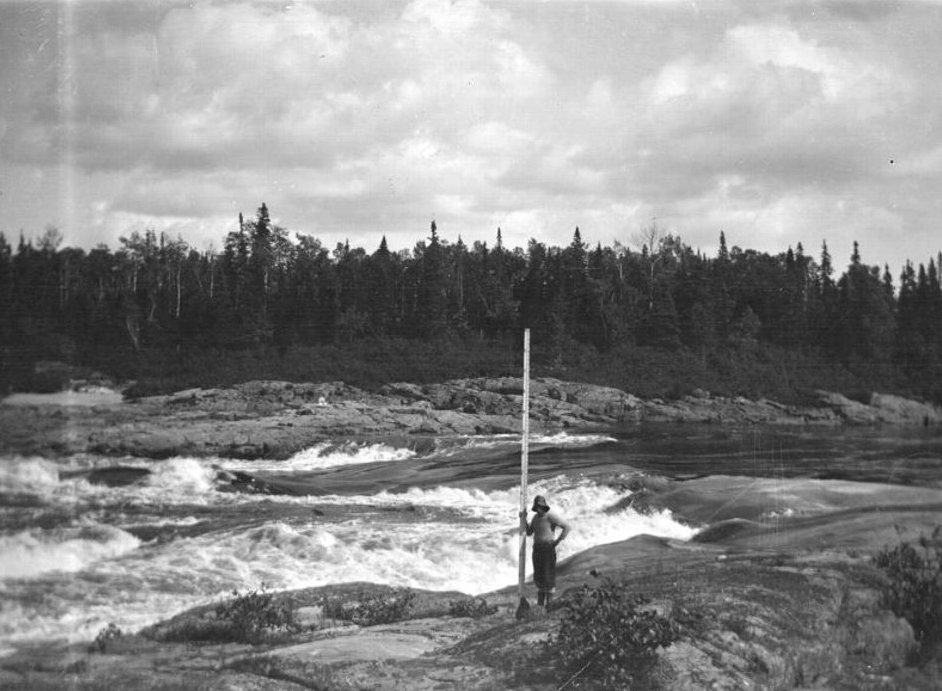
Surveying the Manicouagan River at the first falls, 1919

At the end of August 1535, Jacques Cartier, while sailing south, noted the mouth of this large river but gave it no name. In June 1664, Jesuit Henri Nouvel was the first missionary to travel upstream of the "Grand Manikouaganistikou River that the French call rivière Noire because of its depth". The next year, he "returned to the mouth of the Manicoüagan in June." The river's spelling has remained fairly constant from then on.

In the early 1950s, the Manicouagan River attracted Hydro-Québec's attention for hydro-electric development because of the deep and fast running waters. In 1956, a dam was built at the mouth of Lake Sainte-Anne to regulate the Toulnustouc River, the main left tributary that empties in the Manicouagan between the Manic-2 and Manic-3 dams. Four years later, the main construction work began on the dams and power stations of the Manicouagan River and its neighbor to the west, the Outardes River. By 1978, this project, with a total power supply 4672 MW, was completed.

== Hydro-electric dams ==
There are a number of hydroelectric power plants on the Manicouagan, part of the Manic-Outardes Project:

- McCormick generating station - 335 MW, owned by Hydro-Québec and Alcoa.
- Manic 1 generating station - 184 MW, operated by Hydro-Québec.
- Jean-Lesage generating station, formerly Manic-2 Power Station - 1024 MW, operated by Hydro-Québec.
- René-Lévesque generating station, formerly Manic-3 Power Station - 1244 MW, operated by Hydro-Québec.
- Manic 4 - Abandoned project
- Daniel-Johnson Dam:
  - Manic-5 generating station - 1592 MW, operated by Hydro-Québec.
  - Manic-5-PA generating station - 1064 MW, operated by Hydro-Québec.
