= René-Levasseur Island =

Lake island in Quebec, Canada

René-Levasseur
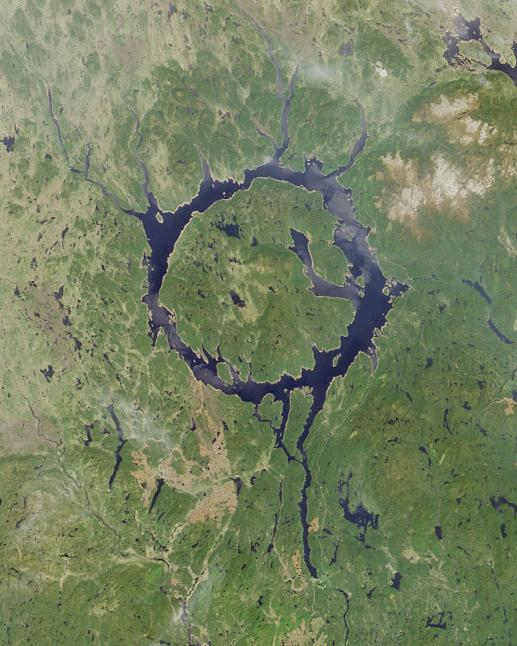
- René-Levasseur Island is the large island in the centre of this image. Image courtesy of NASA.

- Location within Quebec Location within Côte-Nord region, Quebec

Geography
- Location: Manicouagan Reservoir, Rivière-aux-Outardes / Rivière-Mouchalagane, Quebec
- Coordinates: 51°23′50″N 68°41′30″W
- Area: 2,020 km^{2} (780 sq mi) (2005)
- Area rank: 35th in Canada & 110th worldwide
- Highest elevation: 952 m (3123 ft)
- Highest point: Mount Babel

Administration
- Canada
- Province: Quebec
- Region: Côte-Nord
- Regional county municipality: Manicouagan

René-Levasseur Island is a large island in the centre of the Manicouagan Reservoir, or Lake Manicouagan, in Quebec, Canada. This lake is a man made reservoir created when a hydro electric dam was constructed in the 1960s. Its highest peak is Mount Babel, at 952 m (3,123 ft), which is contained in the Louis-Babel Ecological Reserve. The lake and René-Levasseur Island are sometimes called the "eye of Quebec". With a total area of 2,020 km^{2} (780 sq mi) (and a diameter of 50.7 km [31.5 mi]), the island is larger in area than the annular lake in which it is situated. René-Levasseur Island is the world's second-largest lake island (the largest is Manitoulin Island in Lake Huron). It is also the 35th largest lake in Canada and the 110th worldwide The geological feature was formed by the impact of an asteroid 214 million years ago. The asteroid is believed to have been about five kilometres (three miles) in diameter, and would have hit Earth at a speed of 17 km/s (11 mi/s), the fifth most powerful known impact that Earth has seen. The impact of the asteroid formed a crater roughly 100 km (62 mi) in diameter, which has since been eroded to 72 km (45 mi). The central peak of the crater forms the island known today. When the Daniel-Johnson dam was opened in 1970, the Manicouagan River flooded, creating the Manicouagan Reservoir. This merged two crescent-shaped lakes: Mouchalagane Lake on the western side and Manicouagan Lake on the eastern side creating an artificial island.

== Environmental protection ==
The island was the subject of a legal battle, as the Innu First Nation of Betsiamites took legal action to protect its indigenous land from logging by Kruger Inc. They claimed traditional ownership of the land and opposed logging operations in intact forest and caribou habitat. The Innu and the Quebec government clashed over whether logging restrictions should be partly lifted. The island is also the object of an environmental/ecological campaign lobbying the government of Québec to create a protected area spanning the entire island. The group, SOS Levasseur, arose in 2003 partly from the interest that mainstream environmental groups in Québec demonstrated during environmental consultations. All groups recommended that René-Levasseur Island be protected in its entirety. The Island has been proposed as a Canadian National Park, an ecological reserve, a biodiversity reserve and an exceptional geological site. There seems to be an exceptional concentration of old-growth boreal forest stands on the island. SOS Levasseur has been conducting research expeditions on the island since January 2005, whose aim is to identify old-growth forest stands and to obtain their protection under the Quebec Forest Law as Exceptional Forest Ecosystems (EFE). The Ministry of Natural Resources and Fauna (MRNFQ), along with Kruger Inc., have already identified seven EFEs, spanning approximately 25 km^{2} (9.7 sq mi). SOS Levasseur has submitted seven more, surveyed in the summer of 2005, and is expected to submit many more from the 2006 and 2007 expeditions. The MRNFQ has yet to recognize the seven sites proposed by SOS Levasseur.

== Image gallery ==
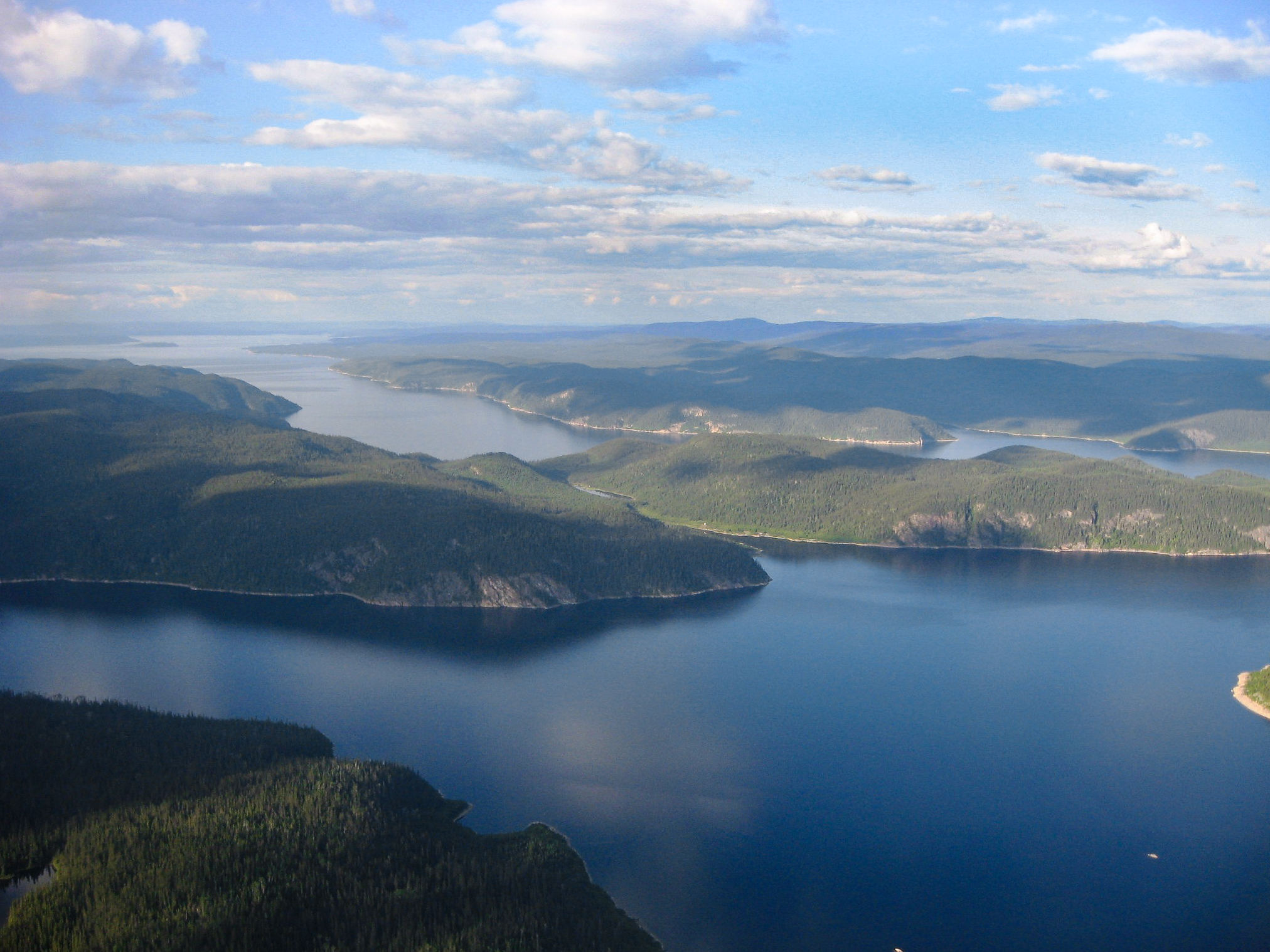
René-Levasseur Island in the background

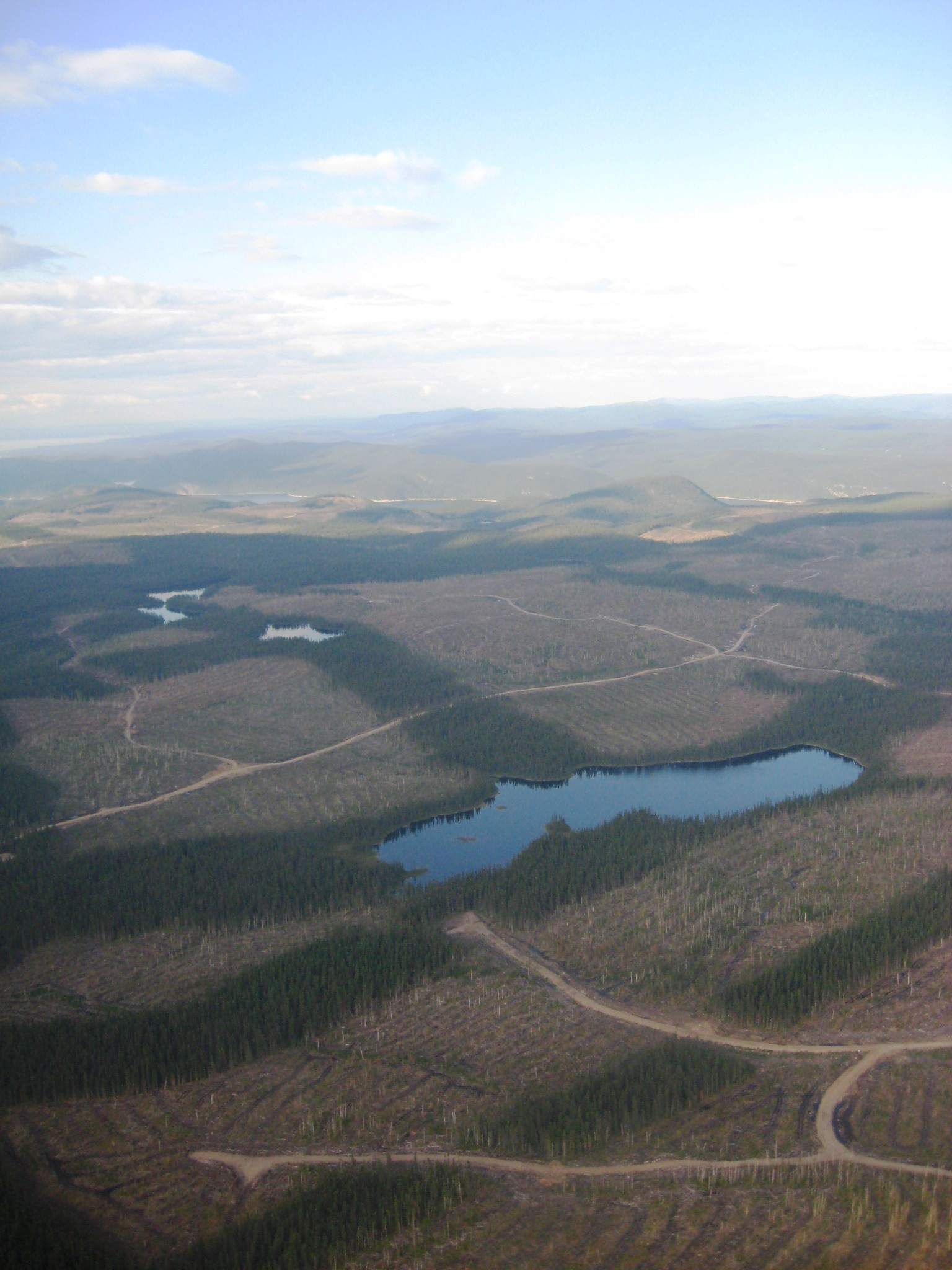
Clearcutting on the island

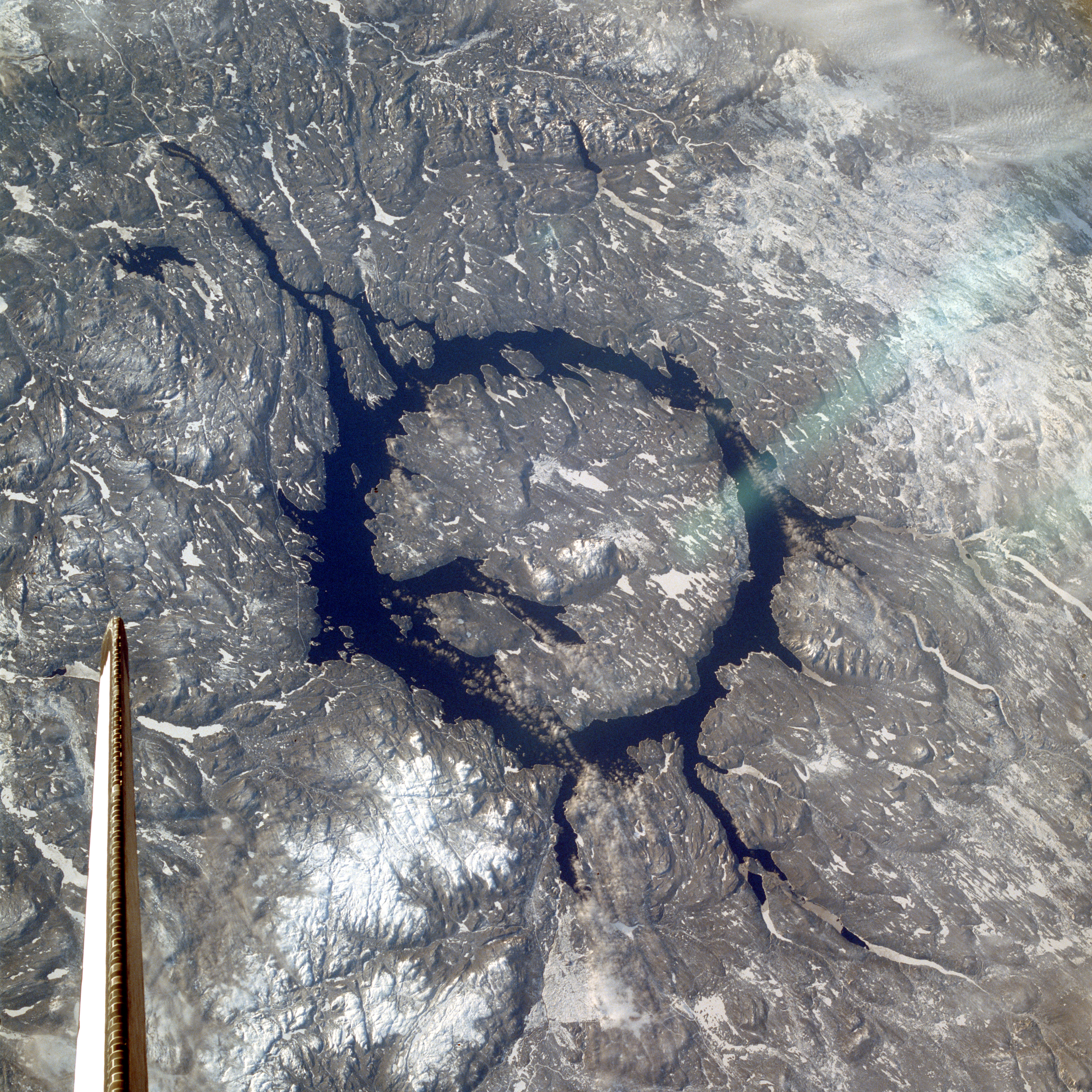
As seen from space shuttle (north is to the lower right)

View towards René-Levasseur Island from Station Uapishka

== See also ==
- List of islands of Canada#Quebec
