= Louis-Babel Ecological Reserve =

Ecological reserve of Quebec (Canada)

Coordinates: 51.45°N 68.6833°W

- IUCN category Ia (strict nature reserve)
- Interactive map of Louis-Babel Ecological Reserve
- Location: Rivière-aux-Outardes, Manicouagan Regional County Municipality, Québec, Canada
- Established: January 30, 1991

Louis-Babel Ecological Reserve is an ecological reserve on René-Levasseur Island in Quebec, Canada. It is named after Canadian priest Louis Babel. It was established on January 30, 1991.

With an area of 23,540 hectares, which makes it by far the largest of the entire Quebec network, the Louis-Babel Ecological Reserve occupies Mount Babel, in the northern part of the René-Levasseur Island (Manicouagan Reservoir). It is located in unorganized territory of the Regional County Municipality of Manicouagan.

This ecological reserve protects boreal, montane, and alpine ecosystems in the Toulnustouc River ecological region (domain of the black spruce-fir and moss forest) and that of the Lac Marceau summits (domain of the black spruce fir forest). It also protects a site of exceptional geological interest since it is one of five Quebec sites characterized by a shock metamorphism structure.

The relief of Île René-Levasseur is hilly. Its central part is surmounted by the Mount Babel, mountainous terrain and very rugged. The altitude varies from 350 to 940 meters. This island has long been of interest to geologists because of its shock metamorphism structure. Its origin is linked to the impact of a celestial body, which dates back to 210 million years ago. This meteorite impact formed a crater, the largest and most complex in Canada. Mount Babel and a strip of land averaging six kilometers in width in the center of the island are the two main areas of shock metamorphism that resulted from the rebound of the crater center. Anorthosite, quartz, and feldspar constitute the principal rocks. Mount Babel is further characterized by a zeolite deposit, a semi-precious stone. This bedrock has been covered by generally thick tills.
