= Leonid Pozen =

Russian artist (1849–1921)

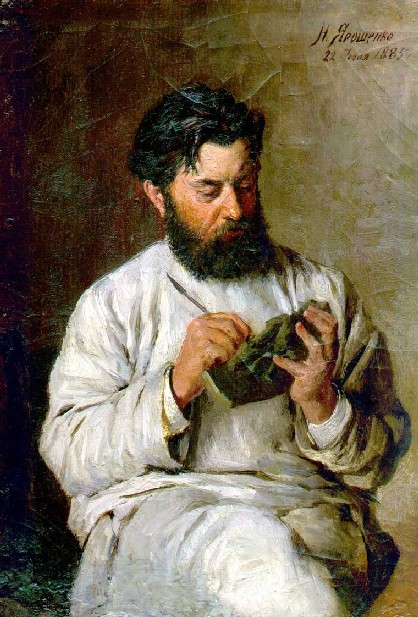
Portrait of Leonis Pozen by Nikolai Yaroshenko (1885)

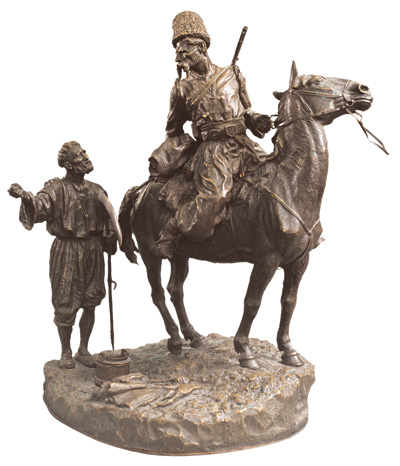
Zaporozhian Cossack

Leonid Vladimirovitch Pozen (born February 26, 1849, Obolon, Poltava Oblast — January 8, 1921, Petrograd (now Saint Petersburg)) was a Russo-Ukrainian sculptor and politician. Most of his works were made using wax and then cast in bronze at the K. Werfel factory in St Petersburg. His early works show his attraction to animal sculpture. His realism placed Pozen alongside the painters Vasily Perov, Grigory Myasoyedov, and Ivan Kramskoy.
