= Veyrier =

- Municipality
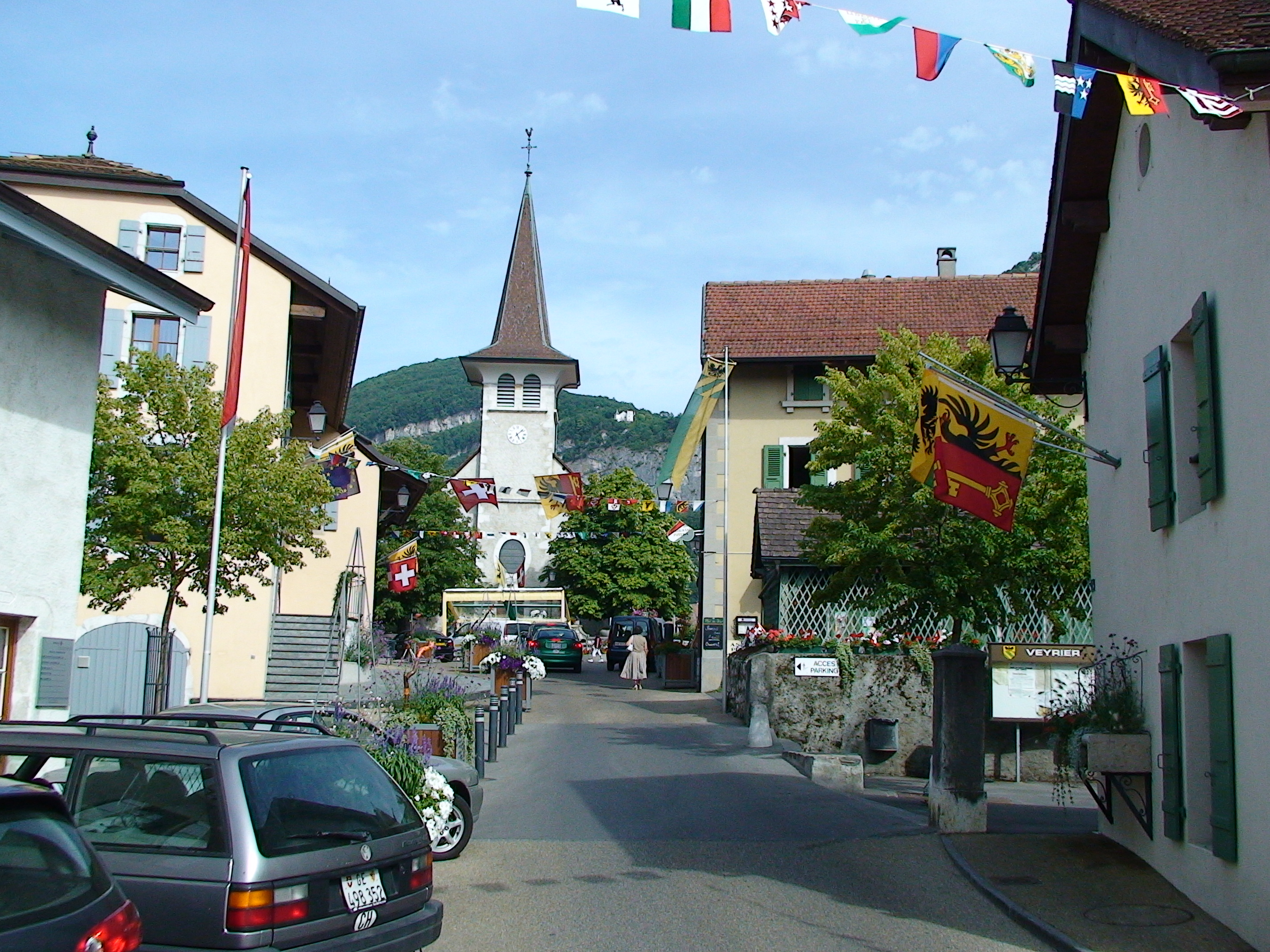

- Flag Coat of arms
- Location of Veyrier
- Location within Switzerland Location within Canton of Geneva
- Coordinates: 46°10′N 06°11′E
- Country: Switzerland
- Canton: Geneva
- District: n.a.

Government
  - Mayor: Maire; Jean-Marie Martin (LC) (as of 2024)

Area
  - Total: 6.50 km^{2} (2.51 sq mi)
- Elevation: 428 m (1,404 ft)

Population (December 2020)
  - Total: 11,861
  - Density: 1,820/km^{2} (4,730/sq mi)
- Time zone: UTC+01:00 (CET)
  - Summer (DST): UTC+02:00 (CEST)
- Postal code: 1234,1255
- SFOS number: 6645
- ISO 3166 code: CH-GE
- Surrounded by: Bossey (FR-74), Carouge, Chêne-Bougeries, Étrembières (FR-74), Gaillard (FR-74), Geneva (Genève), Plan-les-Ouates, Thônex, Troinex
- Website: veyrier.ch

Veyrier (French pronunciation: [veʁje]) is a municipality of the Canton of Geneva, Switzerland, on the French border.

== Geography ==
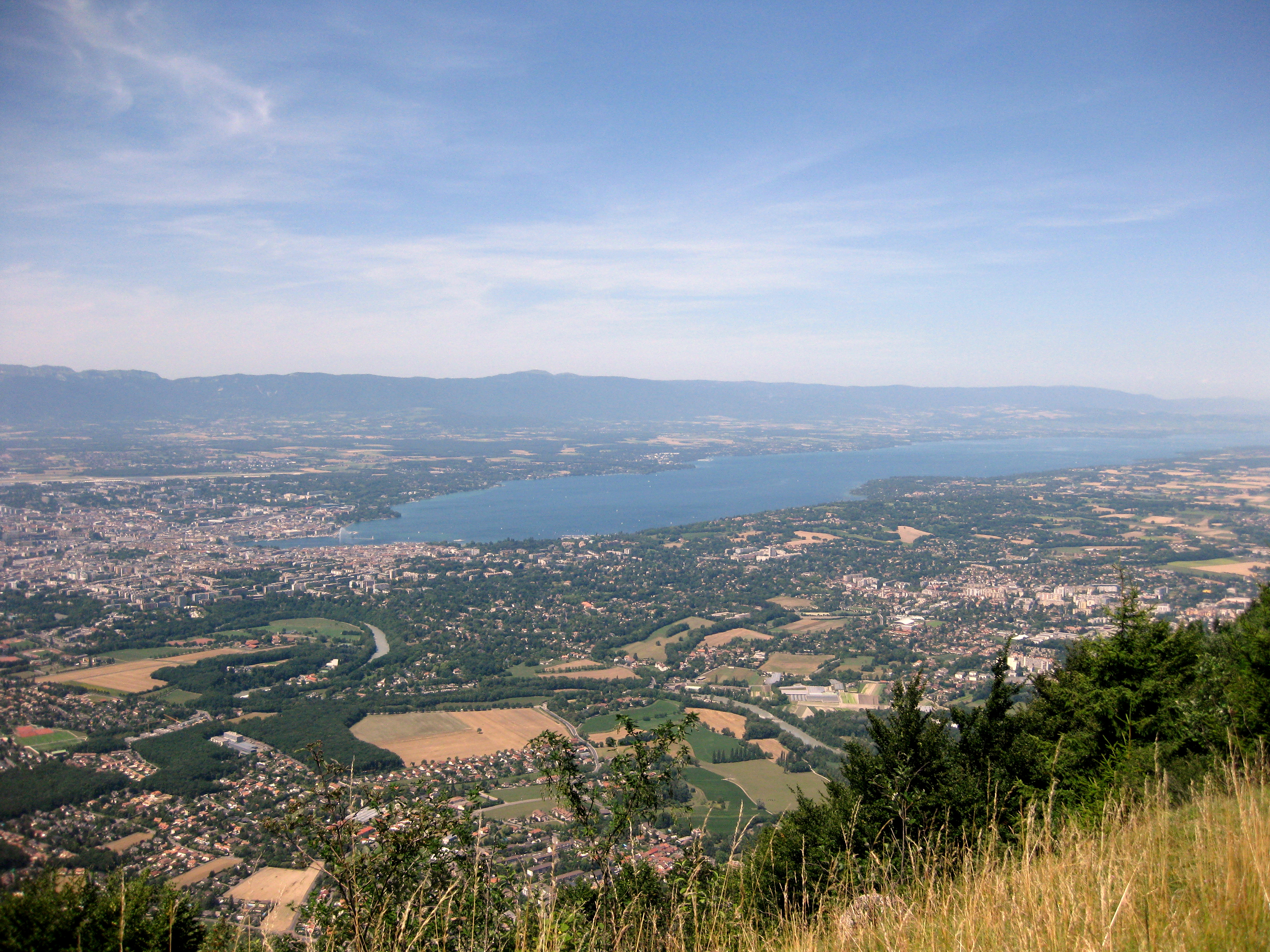
View from Le Salève down to Veyrier and surrounds communities around Lake Geneva

Veyrier has an area, as of 2009, of 6.5 square kilometers (2.5 sq mi). Of this area, 2.17 km^{2} (0.84 sq mi) or 33.4% is used for agricultural purposes, while 0.9 km^{2} (0.35 sq mi) or 13.8% is forested. Of the rest of the land, 3.29 km^{2} (1.27 sq mi) or 50.6% is settled (buildings or roads), 0.17 km^{2} (0.066 sq mi) or 2.6% is either rivers or lakes.

Of the built up area, housing and buildings made up 34.6% and transportation infrastructure made up 8.8%. while parks, green belts and sports fields made up 6.3%. Out of the forested land, 12.6% of the total land area is heavily forested and 1.2% is covered with orchards or small clusters of trees. Of the agricultural land, 26.9% is used for growing crops and 3.4% is pastures, while 3.1% is used for orchards or vine crops. All the water in the municipality is flowing water.

The municipality includes the localities of Pinchat, Vessy and Sierne. It is bordered by Chêne-Bougeries, Thônex, Troinex, Plan-les-Ouates, Carouge, Geneva, and the French municipalities of Collonges-sous-Salève, Bossey and Étrembières in Haute-Savoie.

The municipality of Veyrier consists of the sub-sections or villages of Pinchat - Sur-Rang, Pinchat - La Tour, Vessy - Grande-Fin, Sierne - Petit-Veyrier, Veyrier - village, Tournettes, Rasses, Veyrier - Marais, Grand-Donzel, Bois-de-Veyrier.

== Demographics ==
Largest groups of foreign residents 2013
Nationality	Amount	% total (population)
France	598	5.5
Italy	407	3.7
Portugal	341	3.1
UK	268	2.4
Spain	148	1.4
Germany	120	1.1
USA	111	1.0
Netherlands	95	0.9
Belgium	75	0.7
Russia	53	0.5
Brazil	51	0.5
Romania	41	0.4
Turkey	41	0.4
Canada	34	0.3
Poland	31	0.3
Hungary	28	0.3
Kosovo	28	0.3
Greece	24	0.2
Israel	21	0.2
Lebanon	21	0.2

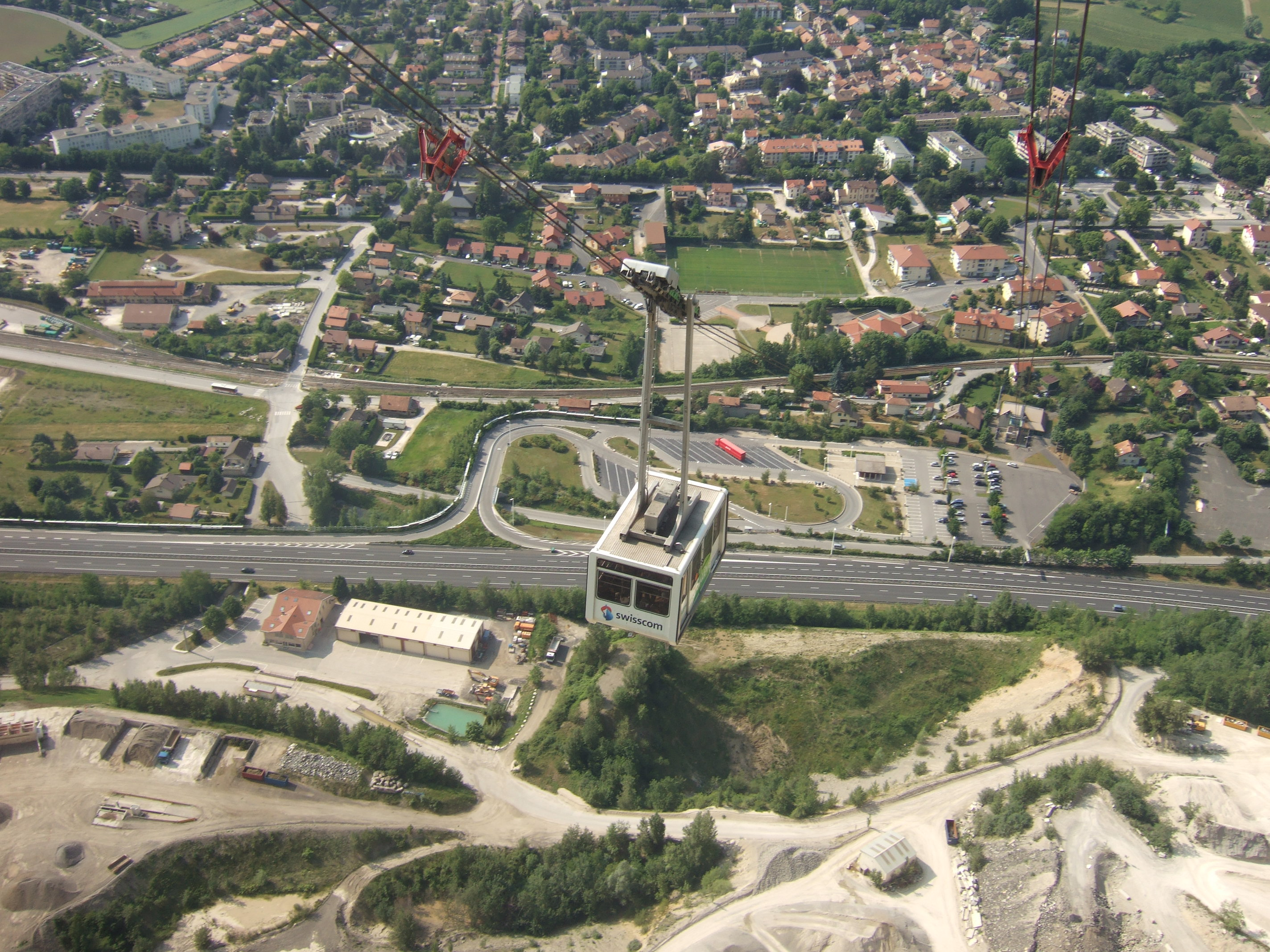
View of Veyrier from a cable car as it descends to the base station

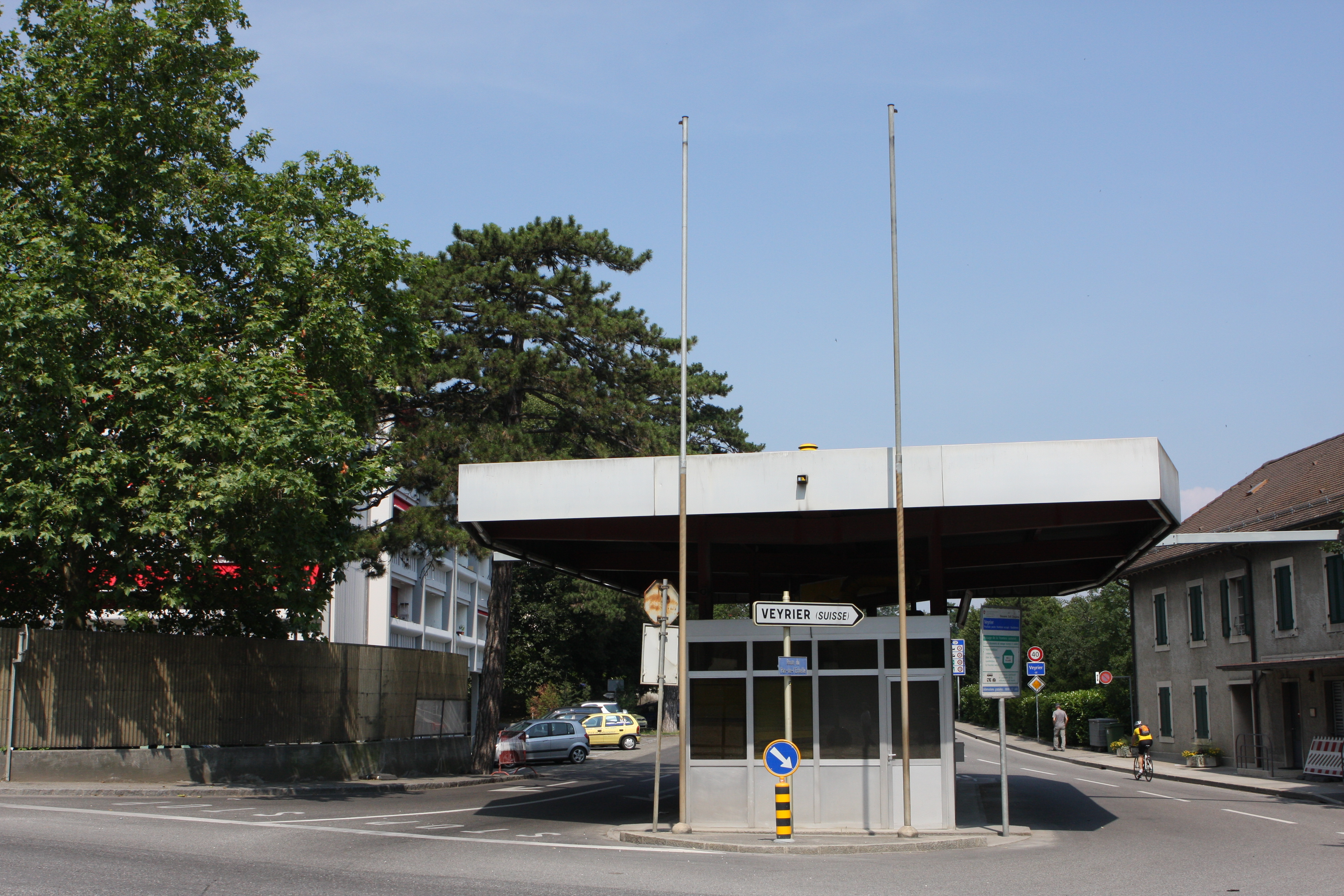
Swiss border at Veyrier

Veyrier has a population (as of December 2020) of 11,861. As of 2008, 24.0% of the population are resident foreign nationals. Over the last 10 years (1999–2009 ) the population has changed at a rate of 10.1%. It has changed at a rate of 12.8% due to migration and at a rate of -3.1% due to births and deaths.

Most of the population (as of 2000) speaks French (7,271 or 81.8%), with German being second most common (517 or 5.8%) and English being third (404 or 4.5%). There are 158 people who speak Italian and 1 person who speaks Romansh.

As of 2008, the gender distribution of the population was 49.0% male and 51.0% female. The population was made up of 3,600 Swiss men (35.9% of the population) and 1,307 (13.0%) non-Swiss men. There were 3,878 Swiss women (38.7%) and 1,233 (12.3%) non-Swiss women. Of the population in the municipality 1,488 or about 16.7% were born in Veyrier and lived there in 2000. There were 2,931 or 33.0% who were born in the same canton, while 1,470 or 16.5% were born somewhere else in Switzerland, and 2,722 or 30.6% were born outside of Switzerland.

In 2008 there were 54 live births to Swiss citizens and 31 births to non-Swiss citizens, and in same time span there were 102 deaths of Swiss citizens and 19 non-Swiss citizen deaths. Ignoring immigration and emigration, the population of Swiss citizens decreased by 48 while the foreign population increased by 12. There were 24 Swiss men and 32 Swiss women who emigrated from Switzerland. At the same time, there were 41 non-Swiss men and 45 non-Swiss women who immigrated from another country to Switzerland. The total Swiss population change in 2008 (from all sources, including moves across municipal borders) was an increase of 2 and the non-Swiss population increased by 121 people. This represents a population growth rate of 1.3%.

The age distribution of the population (as of 2000) is children and teenagers (0–19 years old) make up 27% of the population, while adults (20–64 years old) make up 58.6% and seniors (over 64 years old) make up 14.4%.

As of 2000, there were 3,605 people who were single and never married in the municipality. There were 4,326 married individuals, 475 widows or widowers and 486 individuals who are divorced.

As of 2000, there were 3,255 private households in the municipality, and an average of 2.6 persons per household. There were 887 households that consist of only one person and 282 households with five or more people. Out of a total of 3,338 households that answered this question, 26.6% were households made up of just one person and there were 12 adults who lived with their parents. Of the rest of the households, there are 790 married couples without children, 1,319 married couples with children There were 209 single parents with a child or children. There were 38 households that were made up of unrelated people and 83 households that were made up of some sort of institution or another collective housing.

In 2000 there were 1,662 single family homes (or 81.2% of the total) out of a total of 2,048 inhabited buildings. There were 239 multi-family buildings (11.7%), along with 94 multi-purpose buildings that were mostly used for housing (4.6%) and 53 other use buildings (commercial or industrial) that also had some housing (2.6%). Of the single family homes 122 were built before 1919, while 294 were built between 1990 and 2000. The greatest number of single family homes (403) were built between 1971 and 1980. The most multi-family homes (43) were built between 1996 and 2000 and the next most (38) were built before 1919.

In 2000 there were 3,477 apartments in the municipality. The most common apartment size was 4 rooms of which there were 752. There were 261 single room apartments and 1,446 apartments with five or more rooms. Of these apartments, a total of 3,123 apartments (89.8% of the total) were permanently occupied, while 286 apartments (8.2%) were seasonally occupied and 68 apartments (2.0%) were empty. As of 2009, the construction rate of new housing units was 4.7 new units per 1000 residents. The vacancy rate for the municipality, in 2010, was 0.32%.

The historical population is given in the following chart:

== Heritage sites of national significance ==
The Pont Sur L’Arve (Shared with Genève) is listed as a Swiss heritage site of national significance. The entire village of Veyrier and the hamlet of Sierne are part of the Inventory of Swiss Heritage Sites.

== Politics ==
In the 2007 federal election the most popular party was the LPS Party which received 22.4% of the vote. The next three most popular parties were the SVP (20.37%), the SP (14.24%) and the Green Party (14.17%). In the federal election, a total of 2,976 votes were cast, and the voter turnout was 53.2%.

In the 2009 Grand Conseil election, there were a total of 5,665 registered voters of which 2,680 (47.3%) voted. The most popular party in the municipality for this election was the Libéral with 24.7% of the ballots. In the canton-wide election they received the highest proportion of votes. The second most popular party was the PDC (with 12.5%), they were fifth in the canton-wide election, while the third most popular party was the Les Verts (with 12.1%), they were second in the canton-wide election.

For the 2009 Conseil d'Etat election, there were a total of 5,683 registered voters of which 3,109 (54.7%) voted.

In the 2011 municipal elections, there were 25 spots open on the municipal council of Veyrier. There were a total of 6,837 registered voters of which 3,205 (46.9%) voted. Of those, there were 8 blank votes, 19 null or unreadable votes and 267 votes with a name that was not on the list.

== Economy ==
As of 2010, Veyrier had an unemployment rate of 4.1%. As of 2008, there were 38 people employed in the primary economic sector and about 8 businesses involved in this sector. 189 people were employed in the secondary sector and there were 30 businesses in this sector. 1,300 people were employed in the tertiary sector, with 188 businesses in this sector. There were 4,141 residents of the municipality who were employed in some capacity, of which females made up 43.3% of the workforce.

In 2008 the total number of full-time equivalent jobs was 1,271. The number of jobs in the primary sector was 33, of which 32 were in agriculture and 1 was in fishing or fisheries. The number of jobs in the secondary sector was 178 of which 46 or (25.8%) were in manufacturing and 132 (74.2%) were in construction. The number of jobs in the tertiary sector was 1,060. In the tertiary sector; 103 or 9.7% were in wholesale or retail sales or the repair of motor vehicles, 16 or 1.5% were in the movement and storage of goods, 77 or 7.3% were in a hotel or restaurant, 20 or 1.9% were in the information industry, 17 or 1.6% were the insurance or financial industry, 69 or 6.5% were technical professionals or scientists, 135 or 12.7% were in education and 520 or 49.1% were in health care.

In 2000, there were 1,215 workers who commuted into the municipality and 3,534 workers who commuted away. The municipality is a net exporter of workers, with about 2.9 workers leaving the municipality for every one entering. About 19.1% of the workforce coming into Veyrier are coming from outside Switzerland, while 0.1% of the locals commute out of Switzerland for work. Of the working population, 17.5% used public transportation to get to work, and 63.3% used a private car.

== Religion ==
From the 2000 census, 3,770 or 42.4% were Roman Catholic, while 1,984 or 22.3% belonged to the Swiss Reformed Church. Of the rest of the population, there were 78 members of an Orthodox church (or about 0.88% of the population), there were 9 individuals (or about 0.10% of the population) who belonged to the Christian Catholic Church, and there were 149 individuals (or about 1.68% of the population) who belonged to another Christian church. There were 118 individuals (or about 1.33% of the population) who were Jewish, and 112 (or about 1.26% of the population) who were Muslim. There were 20 individuals who were Buddhist, 5 individuals who were Hindu and 9 individuals who belonged to another church. 1,999 (or about 22.48% of the population) belonged to no church, are agnostic or atheist, and 639 individuals (or about 7.19% of the population) did not answer the question.

== Education ==
In Veyrier about 2,597 or (29.2%) of the population have completed non-mandatory upper secondary education, and 2,325 or (26.1%) have completed additional higher education (either university or a Fachhochschule). Of the 2,325 who completed tertiary schooling, 41.4% were Swiss men, 33.2% were Swiss women, 14.8% were non-Swiss men and 10.6% were non-Swiss women.

During the 2009-2010 school year there were a total of 2,341 students in the Veyrier school system. The education system in the Canton of Geneva allows young children to attend two years of non-obligatory Kindergarten. During that school year, there were 172 children who were in a pre-kindergarten class. The canton's school system provides two years of non-mandatory kindergarten and requires students to attend six years of primary school, with some of the children attending smaller, specialized classes. In Veyrier there were 351 students in kindergarten or primary school and 14 students were in the special, smaller classes. The secondary school program consists of three lower, obligatory years of schooling, followed by three to five years of optional, advanced schools. There were 351 lower secondary students who attended school in Veyrier. There were 554 upper secondary students from the municipality along with 68 students who were in a professional, non-university track program. An additional 439 students attended a private school.

As of 2000, there were 198 students in Veyrier who came from another municipality, while 1,011 residents attended schools outside the municipality.

== Notable people ==
- Louis Babel (1826 in Veyrier – 1912) an Oblate priest, emigrated to Canada in 1851
- Richard Forster (born 1940 in Carouge) a Swiss photographer
- Olivier Long (1915 in Petit-Veyrier – 2003) a Swiss Ambassador and the director-general of GATT, 1968 to 1980
- Loïc Perizzolo (born 1988 in Veyrier) a Swiss track-racing cyclist
