= Obolon' crater =

Asteroid impact crater in Ukraine

- Location within Ukraine
- Location: Kremenchuk Raion, Poltava Oblast, Ukraine; 49°35′N 32°55′E

Impact crater structure
- Confidence: Confirmed
- Diameter: 20 km (12 mi)
- Age: 169 ± 7 Ma; Middle Jurassic
- Exposed: No
- Drilled: Yes
- Bolide type: Iron meteorite?

Obolon' crater (Ukrainian: Оболонь) is a 20 km (12 mi) diameter buried meteorite impact crater situated near the village of Obolon, about 200 km (120 mi) southeast of Kyiv in Poltava Oblast, Ukraine. The site has been drilled, which revealed the presence of shocked minerals and impact melt rock; the high chlorine content of the latter suggesting that the area was covered by shallow sea at the time of impact. One estimate puts the age at 169 ± 7 million years (Middle Jurassic).

== Hypothetical multiple impact event ==
It has been suggested by Geophysicist David Rowley of the University of Chicago, working with John Spray of the University of New Brunswick and Simon Kelley of the Open University, that Obolon' may have been part of a hypothetical multiple impact event which also formed the Manicouagan impact structure in northern Quebec, Rochechouart impact structure in France, Saint Martin crater in Manitoba, and Red Wing crater in North Dakota. All of the craters had previously been known and studied, but their paleoalignment had never before been demonstrated. Rowley has said that the likelihood that these craters could be aligned like this due to chance is nearly zero. However, more recent work has found that the craters formed many millions of years apart, with the Saint Martin crater dating to 227.8 ± 1.1 Ma, while the Rochechouart structure formed 206.92 ± 0.20/0.32 Ma.
