= Rochechouart impact structure =

Asteroid impact structure in France

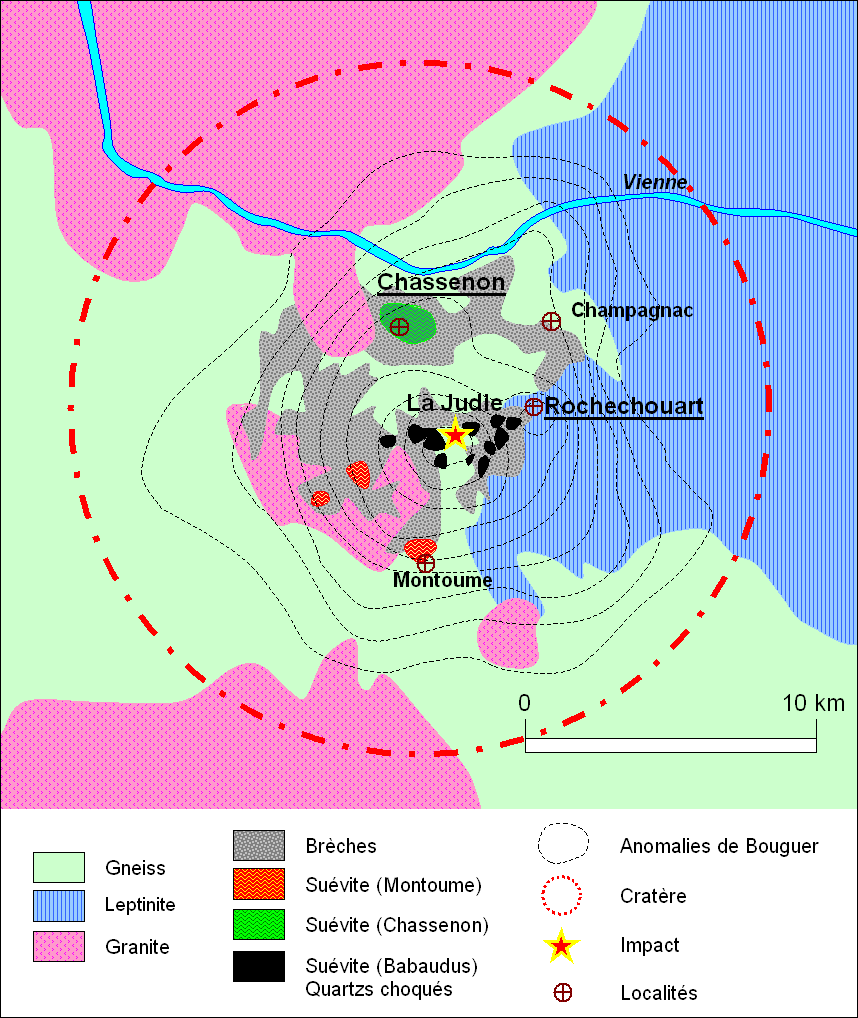
- Map of the Rochechouart impact structure

- Location within France
- Location: Rochechouart, Haute-Vienne, Nouvelle-Aquitaine, France; 45°49′27″N 0°46′54″E

Impact crater structure
- Confidence: Confirmed
- Diameter: 23 km (14 mi)
- Age: 206.9 Ma; Rhaetian
- Exposed: Yes
- Drilled: No

Rochechouart impact structure or Rochechouart astrobleme is an impact structure in France. Erosion has over the millions of years mostly destroyed its impact crater, the initial surface expression of the asteroid impact, leaving highly deformed bedrock and fragments of the crater's floor as evidence of it.

In 2008, the French State acknowledged the heritage value of the Rochechouart impact structure creating the "Réserve Naturelle Nationale de l'astroblème de Rochechouart-Chassenon" on 12 sites representative of characteristic geological features of the impact structure.

== Location ==
Named after the town of Rochechouart, the Rochechouart impact structure is located on the western margin of the French Massif Central near the city of Limoges, approximately 350 km (220 mi) south of Paris. Rochechouart (population about 3800) is built with rocks created or modified by the impact (impactites). Chassenon, a third of the size of Rochechouart, is also built of impactites. Impactite was used 2000 years ago for building Chassenon's monumental Roman baths of Cassinomagus.

Rochechouart impact structure is traversed by an administrative boundary separating the Charente and Haute-Vienne departments. The name of Chassenon (in Charente) was added to Rochechouart (in Haute-Vienne) for naming the Natural Reserve for political reasons aimed at obtaining larger support from both departments.

== History ==
The impact origin of the structure was recognized by F. Kraut in 1969. The occurrence of an unusual set of rock types referred to as breccias on the crystalline rocks of the Massif Central was reported in the Rochechouart area at the start of geology, in the early 1800s. However, their interpretation either as sedimentary, volcanic, tectonic, or a mix of these, was a major subject of debate until impact became progressively recognized as a geological process in the 1960s.

The impact origin of Rochechouart was definitely confirmed in the mid-1970s with the recognition by P. Lambert of the projectile signal in the various rocks bearing up to 500 times the nickel content of the target rocks. Rochechouart was then the first impact structure to be confirmed by the presence of projectile contamination, in the absence of meteorite debris and in the absence of crater morphology. This is significant because after shock metamorphism has been recognized and used by early impact geologists as the criteria for identifying impact structures in the absence of projectile, the opponent to impact craters on Earth postulated an endogenic process so called cryptovolcanism, capable of creating the extreme shock waves responsible for craters and shock metamorphism. Rochechouart was thus on the list of cryptovolcanic structures. The recognition of a projectile signal at Rochechouart and progressively at other impact structures and especially at the K-T boundary a few years later, definitely terminated the era of cryptovolcanism and skepticism toward impact cratering.

== Age ==
The age of the Rochechouart impact is a matter of debate. The ages (within the error bars) spans from less than 150 million years ago to over 240 million years. Since late 1990s the spreading has reduced and the last four determinations (since 2010) are converging toward an age between 203 and 207 million years during the Rhaetian, two to five million years older than the Triassic-Jurassic boundary.

== Hypothetical multiple impact event ==
Geophysicist David Rowley, working with John Spray and Simon Kelley, suggested that Rochechouart may have been part of a hypothetical multiple impact event which also formed the Manicouagan impact structure in northern Quebec, Saint Martin crater in Manitoba, Obolon' crater in Ukraine, and Red Wing crater in North Dakota. All of the impact structures had previously been known and studied, but their paleoalignment had never before been demonstrated. Rowley has said that the chance that these impact structures could be aligned like this due to chance are nearly zero. However, more recent work has found that the craters formed many millions of years apart, with the Saint Martin crater dating to 227.8 ± 1.1 Ma, while the Manicouagan impact structure dates to around 214 ± 1 million years ago.

== Geological setting ==
The Rochechouart impact structure is located on the margin of the French Massif Central. The target rocks exposed both in the center of the structure below the deposit, and radially outward are largely dominated by gneisses (blue and green on the map) and granites (pink on the map). These metamorphic and intrusive rocks were emplaced some 350-300 million years ago during the Variscan orogeny. The latter also referred as to Hercynian orogeny is a geologic mountain-building event caused by Late Paleozoic continental collision between the tectonic plates of Euramerica (Laurussia) and Gondwana to form the supercontinent of Pangaea. This caused the rise of Himalaya-like mountain ridges of the Massif Central, among others. The mountains were already eroded and transformed into a peneplain at the time of the impact.

The center of the structure is only 15–20 km (9.3–12.4 mi) from the closest sediments. The later were deposited after the impact. Yet the impact has most probably taken place on the margin of the Massif Central forming an island at that time, close enough to the nearby sea to have triggered a prominent tsunami.

== Major characteristics ==
The Rochechouart impact structure is composed of central sub circular zone approximately 12 km (7.5 mi) in diameter exposing breccias and impact melt rocks (represented in grey on the map), and an annular diffuse zone approximately 25 km (16 mi) in diameter where breccia dykes, intense fracturing, para-authochonous breccias are locally encountered in the crystalline rocks forming the basement of the crater. The central deposits fill and landmark the initial crater bottom. From a stratigraphical point of view, the impact deposits form a quasi-horizontal (slight tilt of less than 1°) continuous blanket. Yet the deposit is entailed by river valleys providing unique series of cross sections exposing the crater fill, crater floor and underlying bedrock.

Owing to the texture and the composition of the impact breccias, there is no significant contribution from sediments implying there was no sedimentary cover on top of the crystalline basement at the time of impact or it was shallow. The same applies for the sediments deposited in the nearby sea.

Yet the Rochechouart impactites all display a prominent hydrothermal overprint that can be related to the proximity of the sea at the time of impact.

Despite the erosion, the sequence of impactite lithologies is exceptionally complete at Rochechouart. All typologies of impactites and the whole sequence of shock metamorphic features are represented both in the deposits and in target. This includes dislocation breccia, breccia dikes, melt veins, pseudotachylites, cataclasites, shatter cones, megablocks, in the target rocks beneath and around the breccia deposits, and all types of melt free, melt poor and melt rich impactites in the deposits. Even the very fine materials (impactoclastites) depositing last and transported worldwide by the winds, is preserved forming a very fine layered horizontal deposits on top of the melt rich suevite (breccia with a debris matrix and both rock debris and melt fragments as clasts) near Chassenon (see map). This material is emplaced in a quiet environment, after all the chaos produced by the excavation, by the collapse of the cavity, and by the possible back flooding related to the tsunami induced by the impact in the nearby sea. Such a landmark of the final stage of impact deposit is exceptional at impact sites (quasi unique case among the 198 terrestrial meteoritic impacts officially registered on Earth as of 2020).

== Shape and size ==
The geometrical center of the structure is located 4 km (2.5 mi) west of Rochechouart, near the little village of la Judie (see map). The center of the structure according to the nature and distribution of the shock damage in the deposits and according to the negative gravity anomaly in the target stands about 1 km (0.62 mi) further South near Valette.

The size of the Rochechouart impact crater reported in the official impact database (23 km; 14 mi) lacks geologic significance. As previously mentioned, the initial morphology of the crater is lost, as are the initial diameter and shape of the crater. The reported 23 km (14 mi) diameter corresponds to the size of the area where deformation attributed to impact was reported by authors in the 1970s. From the morphology of the crater floor and the distribution of impact deposit it is clear the initial crater was much larger than the 12 km (7.5 mi) zone where outcrops the remnants of the crater fill has been mapped. In the 4–25 km (2.5–15.5 mi) diameter range, terrestrial impact craters are developing a central high, such as Boltysh crater, a 24 km (15 mi) impact crater in Ukraine. Like Rochechouart, Boltysh formed exclusively in crystalline basement. The crater is buried yet the deeper structure is known through numerous drill cores and geophysical investigation undertaken during the Soviet period in the search of hydrocarbons. The central high at Boltysh raises about 1 km (0.62 mi) above the level of crater floor in the low around the central high. There is no central high at Rochechouart, but a flat central low suggesting the central uplift has collapsed, a characteristic feature of larger impact craters. The current estimates for the Rochechouart initial crater fall in the range 40 ± 10 km (24.9 ± 6.2 mi).

== Rochechouart projectile ==
Owing to the prominence of the siderophile contamination, a cometary projectile seems unlikely. The impactor was an asteroid. The earliest identification works involved the same heavy techniques and the same diagnostic elements (Ir, Os and other siderophile elements) as those that became famous in the early 1980s with the identification of the extraterrestrial signal at the K–T boundary worldwide. Since then the two extreme projectile types, iron meteorite and chondrite, have been argued by the successive workers. The most recent studies seems to agree with a special type of achondrite, a mix by impact of iron meteorite and silicates formerly designated as non magmatic iron meteorites.

== Planetary surfaces ==
Within the population of terrestrial impact craters, Rochechouart provides uniquely direct access for investigating major questions related to impact cratering as geological and as a biological process. This includes the understanding of crater fill mechanics and chronology, as well as satellite effects such as resurge, pyroclastic explosions, landslides, and more. This covers the mechanics of large impact crater readjustments and the puzzling challenge of "fluidization", namely making coherent rocks behave like a liquid without melting. This involves characterizing and understanding the impact-induced hydrothermal cell responsible for the prominent hydrothermal overprint at Rochechouart, any possible nutriments, habitats and conditions of potential emergent life at impact craters, and the testing of recent theories and models involving impacts as prominent actors of the habitability of planets.

Despite this exceptional potential, Rochechouart was until very recently, one of the least, if not the least, investigated large impact crater on Earth. This has to do in part with the heavy vegetal cover masking the geology. But the situation is changing rapidly with the installation of the CIRIR (Center for International Research on Impact and on Rochechouart) on site and with the launch of CIRIR programs starting with the first series of drillings of the crater's history. The latter has resulted in eight sites of the National Reserve having been completed. The scientific exploitation of the cores, currently with 60 projects and 60 teams from 12 nations scattered on 4 continents as part of the CIRIR program, is just starting. The curatorial facility on site for hosting the drill cores and the surface samples as part of the impact on shelve is under construction. The sister facility for hosting scientists and students coming worldwide for studying impact cratering and or training in planetary geology is under construction too. All this is possible because of the support of the local territories investing in the CIRIR, because of the State and the local territories both supporting the National Natural Reserve, because of the interest of the scientific community impact, and because of the value and the interest of the Rochechouart impact structure.
