= Saint Martin impact structure =

Asteroid impact crater in Manitoba, Canada

- Location within Canada
- Location: Grahamdale, Manitoba, Canada; 51°47′N 98°32′W

Impact crater structure
- Confidence: Confirmed
- Diameter: 40 km (25 mi)
- Age: 227.8 ± 1.1 Ma; Carnian
- Exposed: No
- Drilled: Yes

Saint Martin is an impact structure in Manitoba, Canada. It is located in the northern part of the Rural Municipality of Grahamdale, northwest of Lake St. Martin.

The impact structure is 40 km (25 mi) in diameter and its age was determined to be 227.8 ± 1.1 million years (Carnian stage of the Triassic) using the argon-argon dating technique. The crater is well preserved but poorly exposed at the surface as the whole region is covered by glacial drift.

== Hypothetical multiple impact event ==
It had previously been suggested by Geophysicist David Rowley of the University of Chicago, working with John Spray of the University of New Brunswick and Simon Kelley of the Open University, that the Saint Martin structure may have been part of a hypothetical multiple impact event which also formed the Manicouagan impact structure in northern Quebec, Rochechouart impact structure in France, Obolon' crater in Ukraine, and Red Wing crater in North Dakota. All of the impact structures had previously been known and studied, but their paleoalignment had never before been demonstrated. Rowley has said that the chance that these structures could be aligned like this due to chance are nearly zero. However, more recent work has found that the craters formed many millions of years apart, with the Saint Martin crater dating to 227.8 ± 1.1 Ma, while the Rochechouart structure formed 206.92 ± 0.20/0.32 Ma.
