= Mouchalagane River =

- Location within Quebec Location within Canada
- Native name: Rivière Mouchalagane (French)

Location
- Country: Canada
- Province: Quebec
- Region: Côte-Nord
- RCM: Caniapiscau
- Unorganized territory: Rivière-Mouchalagane

Physical characteristics
- Mouth: Manicouagan Reservoir
  - coordinates: 51.60806°N 69.11639°W
- Length: 132 kilometres (82 mi)

The Mouchalagane River (French: Rivière Mouchalagane) is a river in the Côte-Nord region of Quebec, Canada. It feeds the Manicouagan Reservoir.

== Hydrology ==
The Mouchalagane river is in the unorganized territory of Rivière-Mouchalagane, in the Regional county municipality of Caniapiscau in the Côte-Nord region of Quebec. It originates in Lake Sommet and Lake Itomanis. It flows south for 132 kilometres (82 mi) to the Manicouagan Reservoir. Tributaries include the Labadie, Tuk and Pipichicau rivers. The upper portion of the river has many rapids. In its lower 80 kilometres (50 mi) it widens to form the western arm of the reservoir, formerly Lake Manicouagan.

== Name ==
The name is of Innu origin and comes from ouragane, meaning "dish or bowl of bark", and moucha meaning "big". However, a toponym survey conducted in 1979 reported that the Innu name used to describe the lake was Mûshaualâkan, which means "to stretch out the nets to open waters". Pierre-Michel Laure shows R. Moucha'ouragane on his map of the Domaine en Canada (1731) and the explorer Albert Peter Low mentioned Mouchalagan River in 1895.

== Sources ==
- Rivière Mouchalagane (in French), Commission de toponymie du Québec
