= Red Wing crater =

Asteroid impact crater located in McKenzie County, North Dakota

- Red Wing Creek structure
- Location within the United States Location within North Dakota
- Location: Watford City, McKenzie County, North Dakota, United States; 47°36′N 103°33′W

Impact crater structure
- Confidence: Confirmed
- Diameter: 9 km (5.6 mi)
- Age: 200 ± 25 Ma; Late Triassic or Early Jurassic
- Exposed: No
- Drilled: Yes

Red Wing or Red Wing Creek structure is a meteor crater located in McKenzie County, North Dakota, about 24 km (15 mi) southwest of Watford City, North Dakota, United States.

== History ==
The crater is not exposed to the surface, but was discovered using seismic techniques, and the structure has produced oil since its discovery in 1972. Red Wing is 9 km (5.6 mi) in diameter, and it is buried at a depth of about 2,000 m (6,600 ft) The age of the structure is estimated at 200 ± 25 million years (Triassic).

The Red Wing Creek structure shows up well in seismic studies. The underlying Ordovician rocks are overlain by disturbed Devonian and Mississippian rocks. The structural disturbance is filled by thick rocks of Jurassic age, suggesting that the impact took place during the Triassic.

Shell Oil Company drilled exploratory wells on the Red Wing Creek structure in 1965 and 1968. These wells did not find oil, but did indicate very thick sections of Mississippian and Pennsylvanian rocks. In 1972, True Oil Company drilled a well that discovered oil. This discovery had an oil column that was about 870 m (2,850 ft) thick instead of the normal 30 m (98 ft). This thick oil column was because the rocks were tilted on their sides.

The discovery of oil led to intense geological and geophysical studies of the Red Wing Creek area. In 1996, Christian Koeberl and his colleagues discovered planar deformation features (PDFs) in samples from two oil wells at the center of the structure. This provided unambiguous evidence for shock metamorphism, and confirmed the impact origin of the Red Wing Creek structure.

== Hypothetical multiple impact event ==
It has been suggested by Geophysicist David Rowley of the University of Chicago, working with John Spray of the University of New Brunswick and Simon Kelley of the Open University, that the Red Wing crater may have been part of a hypothetical multiple impact event which also formed the Manicouagan impact structure in northern Quebec, Rochechouart impact structure in France, Saint Martin crater in Manitoba, and Obolon' crater in Ukraine. All of the craters had previously been known and studied, but their paleoalignment had never before been demonstrated. Rowley has said that the chance that these craters could be aligned like this due to chance are nearly zero. However, more recent work has found that the craters formed many millions of years apart, with the Saint Martin crater dating to 227.8 ± 1.1 Ma, while the Rochechouart structure formed 206.92 ± 0.20/0.32 Ma.
