= Manicouagan Reservoir =

Lake in Quebec, Canada

- View from orbit

- Location within Quebec Location within Canada
- Location: Rivière-aux-Outardes, Manicouagan RCM; Rivière-Mouchalagane, Caniapiscau RCM, Quebec
- Coordinates: 51°07′38″N 68°44′50″W
- Lake type: annular lake, reservoir
- Primary outflows: Manicouagan River
- Catchment area: 29,241 km^{2} (11,290 mi^{2})
- Basin countries: Canada
- Surface area: 1,942 km^{2} (750 mi^{2})
- Average depth: 85 m (279 ft)
- Max. depth: 350 m (1,150 ft)
- Water volume: 137.9 km^{3} (33.1 mi^{3})
- Residence time: 8 years
- Shore length^{1}: 1,322 km (821 mi)
- Surface elevation: 342 to 359 m (1,122 to 1,178 ft) (Dates: 1980 to 2005)
- Islands: René-Levasseur Island, minor islets
- ^{1} Shore length is not a well-defined measure.

Manicouagan Reservoir (also Lake Manicouagan /mænɪkwɑːɡən, -ɡɒ̃/; French: [manikwaɡɑ̃]) is an annular lake in central Quebec, Canada, covering an area of 1,942 km^{2} (750 mi^{2}). The lake island in its centre is known as René-Levasseur Island, and its highest point is Mount Babel. The structure was created 214±1 million years ago, in the Late Triassic, by the impact of a meteorite 5 km (3 mi) in diameter. The lake and island are clearly seen from space and are sometimes called the "eye of Quebec". The lake has a volume of 137.9 km^{3} (33.1 mi^{3}).

== Geography ==
The crater in winter, as seen from space

The reservoir is located in Manicouagan Regional County Municipality in the Côte-Nord region of Quebec, Canada, about 300 km (190 mi) north of the city of Baie-Comeau, although its northernmost part is located in Caniapiscau Regional County Municipality. Quebec Route 389 passes the eastern shore of the lake.

The crater is a multiple-ring structure about 100 km (60 mi) across, with the reservoir at its 70 km (40 mi) diameter inner ring being its most prominent feature. It surrounds an inner island plateau called René-Levasseur Island and Mount Babel is the highest peak of the island, at 952 m (3,123 ft) above sea level and 590 m (1,936 ft) above the reservoir level. The Louis-Babel Ecological Reserve makes up the central part of the island. The large bay on the eastern shore of the island is named Memory Bay.

== Impact structure ==
Manicouagan Reservoir impact structure

Impact crater structure
- Confidence: Confirmed
- Diameter: 100 km (62 mi) (originally); 72 km (45 mi) (visible today)
- Impactor diameter: 5 km (3.1 mi)
- Age: 214±1 Ma

Manicouagan Reservoir lies within the remnant of an ancient, deeply eroded impact crater (Impact structure). The crater was formed following the impact of an asteroid with a diameter of 5 km (3 mi), which excavated a crater originally about 100 km (62 mi) wide, although erosion and deposition of sediments have since reduced the visible diameter to about 72 km (45 mi). It is the Earth's sixth-largest confirmed impact structure according to rim-to-rim diameter. Mount Babel is interpreted as the central peak of the crater, formed by post-impact uplift.

1992 radiometric dating has estimated that impact melt within the impact structure has an age of 214±1 million years. A later estimate found an age of 215.4±0.16 Ma. As this is more than 12 million years before the end of the Triassic, the impact that produced the crater cannot have been the cause of the Triassic–Jurassic extinction event.

=== Impact effects ===
The Manicouagan impact had a widespread effect on the planet; a 214-million-year-old ejecta blanket of shocked quartz has been found in rock layers as far away as England and Japan.

It has been suggested that the Manicougan impact event may be linked to an extinction event. The timing of the Manicouagan impact coincides with the Adamanian-Revueltian turnover, a possibly localized extinction event where Trilophosaurus, Poposaurus, Desmatosuchus, dicynodonts, and non-mystriosuchin phytosaurs are extirpated from the Jim Camp Wash beds at the Petrified Forest National Park, while metoposaurs and allokotosaurs as a whole decline in abundance. However, there is a lack of direct evidence to definitively link these two events.

Onoue et al. (2016) proposed that the Manicouagan impact was responsible for a marine extinction in the middle of the Norian which affected radiolarians, sponges, conodonts, and Triassic ammonoids. The Manicouagan impact may have been partially responsible for the gradual decline in the latter two groups which culminated in their extinction during the Triassic–Jurassic extinction event.

=== Multiple impact event claims ===
It was suggested that the Manicouagan crater may have been part of a multiple impact event, similar to the well-observed string of impacts of Comet Shoemaker–Levy 9 on Jupiter in 1994. The theory suggests this event also formed the Rochechouart impact structure in France, the Saint Martin crater in Manitoba, the Obolon' crater in Ukraine, and the Red Wing crater in North Dakota; however, more recent work has found that the craters formed many millions of years apart, with the Saint Martin crater dating to 227.8±1.1 Ma, while the Rochechouart structure formed 206.92±0.32 Ma.

== Hydroelectric project ==
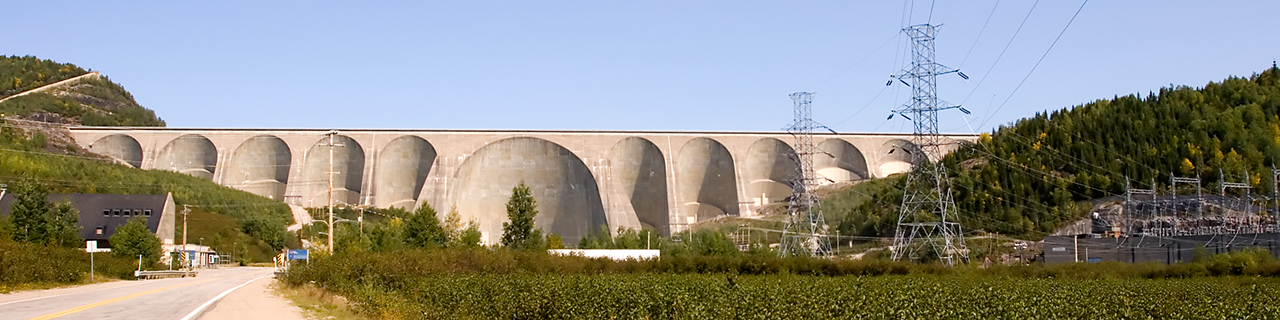
Daniel-Johnson Dam, the primary dam on the Manicouagan Reservoir, supports the Manic-5 hydro-power station

The Manicouagan Reservoir as it presently exists was created in the 1960s, by flooding the earlier Lake Mushalagan (Mouchalagan) to the west of the central plateau and then-smaller Manicouagan to the east, by construction of the Daniel-Johnson dam. The works were part of the enormous Manicouagan or Manic series of hydroelectric projects undertaken by Hydro-Québec, the provincial electrical utility. The complex of dams is also called the Manic-Outardes Project because the rivers involved are the Manicouagan and the Outardes.

The reservoir acts as a giant headpond for the Manicouagan River, feeding the Jean-Lesage generating station (Manic-2), René-Lévesque generating station (Manic-3), and Daniel-Johnson Dam (Manic-5) generating stations downstream. In the peak period of the winter cold, the lake surface is usually lower, since the turbines run all the time at peak load to meet the huge electrical heating needs of the province. The surface of the lake also experiences low levels in the extreme periods of heat in New England during the summer, since in that period Hydro-Québec sells electrical energy to the joint New England grid and individual utilities in the United States.

== See also ==
- Manicouagan Uapishka Biosphere Reserve
- List of impact structures on Earth
- Wembo-Nyama ring structure
