= Louis Babel =

Swiss Catholic missionary (1826–1912)

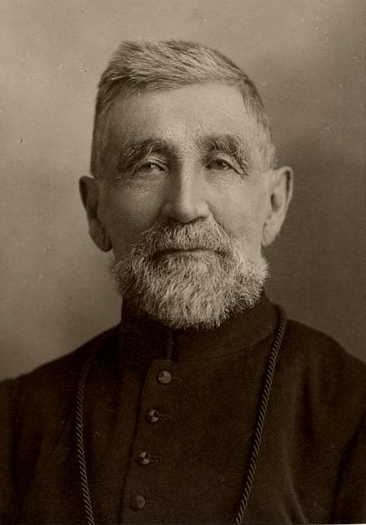
- Born: 23 June 1826; Veyrier, Switzerland
- Died: 1 March 1912 (aged 85); Pointe-Bleue, Quebec

Louis Babel (23 June 1826 – 1 March 1912) was an Oblate priest who might be considered multi-faceted in his career. He was born in Veyrier, Switzerland and received his formal training in Europe before coming to Canada in 1851. He was ordained in Bytown upon his arrival by Bishop Joseph-Bruno Guigues.

His first assignment was as a missionary among the Montagnais (Innu) in the Saguenay region of Lower Canada. He moved from Grande-Baie to Les Escoumins where he began working with Father Charles Arnaud. He and Arnaud would be together for almost 60 years.

Looking back at his long career, Babel is remembered for his dedication and self-sacrifice as a missionary. He had a deep concern for the welfare of the natives and for carrying out the difficult tasks assigned to him. Both Father Babel and Father Arnaud were great observers of their environment and the Indian tribes they served. While Father Arnaud attended his mission along the Lower North Shore, Father Babel led many missionary expeditions to the interior Labrador Plateau. An observation while at Lake Winokapau in 1866, he noted in his diaries a great showing of minerals. Again on a later mission to the Menihek River area more description of the abundance of iron ore. Many of these notations were used by Quebec Crown Lands to compile base maps. In 1892 a geologist by the name of Albert Peter Low, working for the Geological Survey of Canada, revealed for the first time the vast iron ore deposits and eventually the developments by the Iron Ore Company of Canada of Schefferville and Labrador City.

Mount Babel in Quebec is named after him.
