= Obolon, Poltava Oblast =

Rural locality in Poltava Oblast, Ukraine

Obolon Оболонь
- Village
- Interactive map of Obolon
- Coordinates: 49°36′15″N 32°52′35″E
- Country: Ukraine
- Oblast: Poltava Oblast
- Raion: Kremenchuk Raion
- Hromada: Obolon rural hromada
- Founded: 1740s
- Elevation: 87 m (285 ft)

Population (2001)
  - Total: 2,183
- Time zone: UTC+2 (EET)
  - Summer (DST): UTC+3 (EEST)
- Postal code: 38230
- Area code: +380 -5341

Obolon (Ukrainian: Оболонь) is a village in Kremenchuk Raion, Poltava Oblast (province) of central Ukraine. It hosts the administration of Obolon rural hromada, one of the hromadas of Ukraine.

In 2020, the surrounding hromada had a population of just over five thousand inhabitants, of whom about two thousand lived in the village of Obolon itself and the rest spread across twenty hamlets. It is located about 20 km west of Semenivka, on the eastern outskirts of the Lower Sula National Nature Park.

== History ==
Obolon was founded in the 1740s by Demyan Obolonsky, military commander of the Cossack Hetmanate in the area. It was founded to rebuild a pre-existing village called "Samosidovka" (Самосідовка), which had been almost abandoned due to disputes over its noble jurisdiction. The village originally belonged to the Myrhorod Cossack Regiment. It belonged to the Obolonsky family until the mid-19th century, when it passed to the Pozen noble family, among whose members was Leonid Pozen, a well-known sculptor born in this village. During this period, it acquired the status of a miasteczko and the capital of its own volost in the Khorolsky Uyezd of the Poltava Governorate. The Ukrainian SSR established a raion seat here in 1923. Obolon lost its status as a district capital in 1962, when it was incorporated into Khorol Raion. In 1965, it became part of Semenivka Raion It remained in that raion until 2020, when Semenivka Raion was merged into Kremenchuk Raion.
