= Belle-Rivière =

Belle-Rivière or Belle Rivière may refer to:

== Canada ==
- Belle-Rivière, Quebec, unorganized territory, in Lac-Saint-Jean-Est, Saguenay–Lac-Saint-Jean
- Bois de Belle-Rivière Regional Park, in Mirabel, Laurentides, Quebec
- Domaine et manoir de Belle-Rivière, a heritage building in Mirabel, Laurentides, Quebec
- La Belle Rivière (Lac Saint-Jean), river in Belle-Rivière, Quebec
- Lac de la Belle Rivière, lake in Belle-Rivière, Quebec

== See also ==
- Belle River (disambiguation)
- Belle Rive (disambiguation)
