= Sainte-Jeanne-d'Arc Vacation camp =

Summer camp in Québec, Canada

Sainte-Jeanne-d'Arc Vacation Camp
- Location within Quebec
- Location: 10020, route Marie-Victorin, Contrecoeur, QC, J0L 1C0, Canada
- Coordinates: 45°58′11.6″N 73°11′12.4″W
- Elevation: 14
- Type: Family camp and summer camp for girls
- Restaurants: Cafétéria
- Facilities: Swimming pool
- Season: 4 seasons camp
- Operated by: Colonie Sainte-Jeanne d'Arc inc.
- Owner: Colonie Sainte-Jeanne d'Arc inc.
- Established: 1926
- Website: csjd.qc.ca

The Sainte-Jeanne d'Arc summer camp (initially designated "Jeanne d'Arc holiday colony inc.") was established in 1926 serving the girls of greater Montreal. It is the second oldest summer camp exclusively for young girls, still in operation in Quebec and French Canada.

This family vacation colony for young girls is located on the southeast shore of the St. Lawrence River, in the First Concession, in the town of Contrecoeur, in the Marguerite-D'Youville Regional County Municipality, in the administrative region of Montérégie, in province of Quebec, in Canada.

This girls' camp is located 0.85 kilometres (0.53 mi) southwest of Des Grèves Vacation Camp; the latter was founded in 1912 by the same founder, Father Adélard Desrosiers, and was dedicated to boys until 1967.

== Mission, vision and educational values ==
Throughout its history, the Joan of Arc Colony has perpetuated its primary mission of welcoming young girls only. Thus, this colony aims to offer a camp experience especially to children from low-income families. The pricing charter is based on family income and the number of dependent children. The campers are 4 and 14 years old, coming from all socio-economic situations.

According to its mission, this summer camp dedicated to young girls has endowed itself with a program of quality, diversified, educational and distinctive leisure activities. The stay aims in particular to develop the full potential of campers through sports and the arts, learning social skills through group living and valuing each camper.

The Sainte-Jeanne d´Arc Summer Camp is accredited by the Association des Camps du Québec.

== Activities and services offered ==
This vacation camp offers various summer camps for young girls supervised by experienced instructors: • summer day camps: outdoor educational program; • summer camps for stays with a variety of activities; • nature classes: a range of outdoor activities, in the forest and by the river. Accompanying adults can take part in the activities, relax in the large lounge or sunbathe; • stays for specific periods, in particular for the holiday season; • rental of chalets, accommodation or camping pitches for groups of children (e.g. cadets, scouts, etc.).

The site has a four kilometer forest path for nature enthusiasts. Vacationers can pick vegetables from the community garden or stop by the farmhouse. Participants in a stay can use the swimming pool or play board games: • outside: iron games, pétanque, croquet or group hikes; • inside: craft workshops, songs, stories told in the large living room.

In winter, an ice rink covers the garden. The 4-kilometer hiking trail in summer then stretches over six kilometers for cross-country skiing. In addition, the Des Grèves Regional Park, located just a 10-minute walk north-east, is accessible for sporting activities such as cross-country skiing, snowshoeing, sliding, walking, a mini farm and an ice rink. This park also offers tube sliding with sliding corridors.

The management of this summer camp decreed in March 2020 the suspension of camp activities for an indefinite period, following the imposition of health measures by the government of Quebec as part of the fight against the global pandemic of the Coronavirus. COVID-19. Consequently, the summer 2020 programming only included day camps.

== Owner ==
This summer camp was initially operated under the umbrella of "La Colonie de vacances Jeanne d'Arc Inc."

On December 22, 1941, a request was made to obtain its incorporation under the name of "La Colonie de vacances Sainte-Jeanne d'Arc" which will become the owner of all the property and all the rights and privileges possessed by the Colonie de vacances Jeanne d'Arc Inc.

The "Colonie de vacances Sainte-Jeanne d´Arc inc" was incorporated on May 20, 1969, according to the third part of the Quebec Companies Act. The last registration was made on March 24, 1995, under the name “Colonie Sainte-Jeanne d'Arc” as a non-profit legal person.

== Sponsors ==
The first known fundraising activity for the colony took place on November 30, 1928, when the director of the camp Mlle Payant organized a euchre in the Salle de l'Assistance Publique, rue Lagauchetière, in Montreal. Over the following decades, newspaper articles reported on the colony's fundraising activities in Montreal.

The longevity of the Colony is supported by grants from various sources: the Fédération des Œuvres de Charité canadienne-française (until 1966), Centraide-Montreal (since 1966), the Club Kiwanis-Saint-Laurent, at least since 1950.

In the 1940s, the Sainte-Jeanne d´Arc Vacation Colony received $5,000 annually from the city of Montreal; in addition, an additional sum of $1000 was paid in 1941 for new constructions.

In 1982, the Ministry of Recreation, Hunting and Fishing granted $36,000 to the Colony.

Since the 1990s, the Colony has been subsidized by the High Commission for Youth, Sports and Recreation and by Centraide.

== Buildings and infrastructures ==
In 1943, the site of the Sainte-Jeanne d'Arc colony had 13 pavilions: kitchen, refectory, laundry room, infirmary, dormitory, recreation room, chapel, etc.

The Saint-Arsène holiday colony which was established near the Saint-Joan of Arc colony. When the Saint-Arsène colony ceased activities, the goods were acquired by the Sainte-Jeanne d'Arc colony, namely the chapel, the Marlène pavilion, the house near the chapel and a large room with a roof outdoors near the river.

Today, the Sainte-Jeanne d'Arc colony has around twenty buildings, mostly built in the 1940s, including: • Pavillon Girouard - This pavilion offers the comfort of an inn, comprising a living room with fireplace and a dining room. • Large chapel with 140 places, built around 1940, which has a cultural and recreational vocation. Its current style respects the original architecture. Most of the materials are original, including the hardwood plank flooring, wood railings and wood trim. • Small chapel. • Flag of Marlène. • Chalets.

Apart from the two chapels, the style of the buildings is similar to the contemporary architecture of the first half of the 20th century.

== History of the summer camp ==
From 1926 to 1941 under the aegis of "La Colonie de vacances Jeanne d'Arc Inc."

In 1926, Father Adélard Desrosiers (1873-1953) acquired a 40-acre lot of land (16.2 hectares (40 acres)) in Contrecoeur, on the southeast shore of the St. Lawrence River, for the purpose of establish a French-speaking camp for young girls. At the time, the Colonie Jeanne-d'Arc was one of the rare single-sex camps in Quebec and still reserved for girls. The mission of this new colony for girls was the same as for the colony of Grèves which had also been founded by Father Adélard Desrosiers.

Originally from Lanoraie, Father Desrosiers was educated at the Grand Séminaire de Montréal and ordained a priest on September 11, 1898. In 1904 he completed his studies in literature at the University of Paris. He became principal assistant at the École Normale Jacques-Cartier in Montreal, where he subsequently became principal (1912-1937), for 25 years. Desrosiers founded the Des Grèves Vacation Camp in Contrecoeur, dedicated to boys.

During the period 1926 to 1940, campers generally lived in tents. Volunteer ladies and nuns were in charge of the kitchens, the infirmary and the accounts. The Colony could then accommodate about thirty campers at a time, aged between 7 and 12 years old. The facilitators were generally recruited through the scout movement.

In 1934, the colony had five dormitories, a chapel, a refectory for campers with a kitchen and a refectory for the "Sisters consolers of the Divine Heart" who were in charge of an orphanage at La Repair, at Pointe-aux-Trembles. Five of these nuns, including a registered nurse, took care of the colony in 1933 where 347 children stayed there.

From 1942 to 2001, under the aegis of "La Colonie de vacances Sainte-Jeanne d´Arc Inc."

The majority of the current buildings of the Colony were built during the 1940s. As a result of these constructions, the accommodation capacity of the colony increased to three groups of 150 girls for stays lasting up to 21 days. In 1981, the Colony could accommodate up to 500 girls per summer, from six to 12 years old.

In 1944, this summer camp welcomed 410 young girls.

In 1989, the colony had a double vocation: campers in summer and 2,500 people per year of senior citizens who stay the rest of the year at the Pavillon Girouard, alone, as a couple or in a group; around 80% of these vacationers are women. This pavilion offers the comfort of an inn, with a living room with fireplace and a dining room.

Until 2001, the Colony had a capacity of 4 groups of 150 young girls aged 4 to 14 years old.

Highlights of this period

• May 28, 1960 - The Les Grèves and Sainte-Jeanne d'Arc holiday camps are the subject of a special broadcast on Radio-Canada, as part of a series on holiday camps. A program specific to the Colonie Sainte-Jeanne d'Arc was broadcast on June 4, 1960, on Radio-Canada.

• 1969 - The Federation of French-Canadian Charities concludes an agreement with the Saint-Laurent Kiwanis Club Foundation, which gradually takes charge over five years of the administration of the Sainte-Jeanne d'Arc Vacation Colony. Thanks to this financial support, the Colony continues its mission and offers a range of specialized services.

• August 16, 1978 - Celebration of the 50th anniversary of the Colony.

• 1995 (summer) - The Théâtre des lunes de miel moved into the chapel of the Colony, with the main actors: Isabelle Lajeunesse and François Guy.

2002 to present

In 2002, the Colony's accommodation capacity increased to 600 campers divided into four groups of 150 young girls.

Highlights of this period

== Colony leadership and workers ==
Throughout history, the directors general (sometimes referred to as the "camp director") of the Colony have included: • Miss M. L. Payant, in 1928, • Mrs. O. Perrault, in 1945, • Maurice Gaudreault, from 1971 to at least 1976, • Jessica Charland, in 2020.

The workers at the colony are usually college and university students, most of whom are enrolled in childhood-related programs. They occupy roles including instructor, responder, rescuer and specialist.

All the leaders of this colony have received training in the security measures and programming of the Colony. In addition, more than 50% of the animators hold a certification in first aid specially adapted to the environment of the camps.

Each spring, the management of the Colony organizes a campaign to recruit, select and train aspiring instructors, generally between 15 and 16 years old. This 21-day Aspiring Counselor Program (PAM), including a 50-hour internship, is the culmination of the lives of campers aspiring to a future job as a camp counselor! PAM is recognized by the Association des camps du Québec. In addition to the PAM certification, instructors can also receive the Diploma of Skills for Facilitator Functions (DAFA).

== Toponymy ==
The toponyms "colonie de vacances Sainte-Jeanne d’Arc" (Sainte-Jeanne d'Arc vacation camp) have not yet been formalized by the Commission de toponymie du Québec.

== Appendices ==
=== Bibliography ===
- Official site of the Sainte-Jeanne d´Arc summer camp.
- Press review of the history of the Sainte-Jeanne’Arc summer camp, compiled in 2020 by historian Gaétan Veillette.

=== Related Articles ===
- Contrecoeur, a town
- St. Lawrence River
- Des Grèves Vacation Camp
- Des Grèves Regional Park
