= Poisson-Blanc Regional Park =

Protected area in Laurentides, Quebec, Canada

- Parc régional du Poisson-Blanc
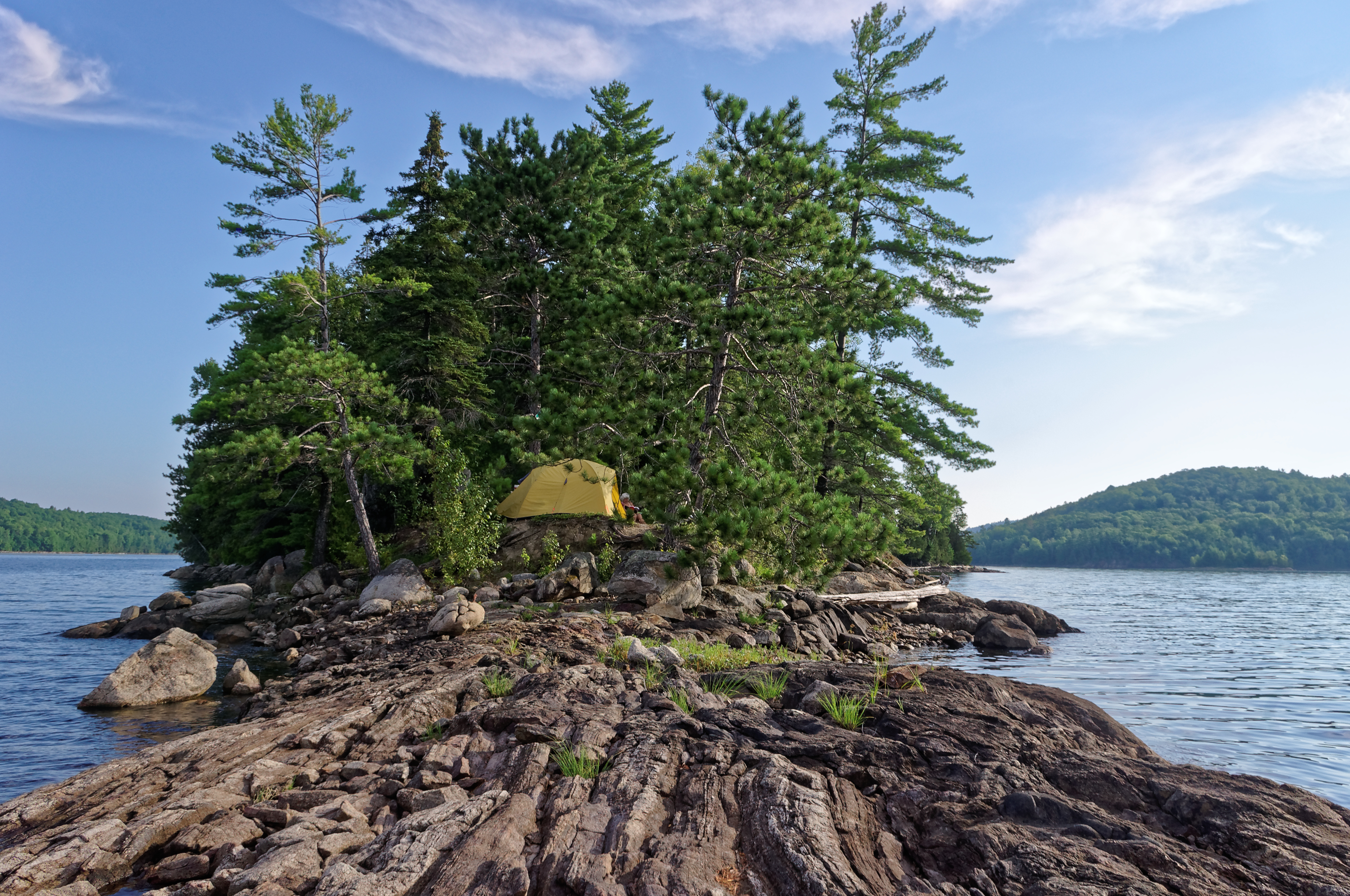
- Parc Régional at Lake Poisson Blanc

- Location within Quebec Location within Canada
- Interactive map of Poisson-Blanc Regional Park
- Location: Laurentides, Antoine-Labelle Regional County Municipality, Quebec, Canada
- Nearest city: Notre-Dame-du-Laus
- Coordinates: 46.095°N 75.67389°W
- Area: 85 km^{2} (33 sq mi)
- Elevation: 480 metres (1,570 ft)
- Established: 2008
- Administrator: Corporation du Parc du Poisson-Blanc
- Website: https://poissonblanc.ca/

The Poisson-Blanc Regional Park (French: Parc régional du Poisson-Blanc) is a regional park located at the Poisson-Blanc Lake (or Poisson-Blanc Reservoir) in the municipality of Notre-Dame-du-Laus, in the Antoine-Labelle Regional County Municipality, in administrative region of Laurentides, in Quebec, in Canada.

This park is administered by the "Corporation du Parc du Poisson-Blanc" (trans-en|Poisson-Blanc Parks Development Corporation) (CPPB) which is a non-profit organization and whose head office is located at 37 ch. de la Truite, Notre-Dame-du-Laus, Quebec, J0X 2M0. The CPPB was registered on March 7, 2005 in the Quebec enterprise register. This organization's mission is to see to the development and integrated management of the recreational tourism resources of Notre-Dame-du-Laus. This organization is mandated by the Antoine-Labelle Regional County Municipality, as well as the municipality of Notre-Dame-du-Laus for the operations of the park. The Poisson-Blanc Regional Park has been created in 2008.

The Bastion reception pavilion is located on a peninsula west of the village of Notre-Dame-de-Laus. It is also possible to access the Poisson Blanc reservoir from the south (Bowman/Denholm); if necessary, excursionists must rent boats at the Air-Eau-Bois outdoor base.

== Geography ==
The Poisson-Blanc regional park is located on the east shore of Poisson-Blanc Lake, near Notre-Dame-du-Laus village.

== History ==
In 2002, the creation of a regional park in Notre-Dame-du-Laus was already under consideration. In 2005, the Corporation du Parc du Poisson Blanc was formed. The organizers then drafted a plan to develop the islands of the Poisson-Blanc Lake.

In 2006-2007, the organization hired three technicians to undertake and coordinate the cleaning of the tank. Particularly in collaboration with the Air-Eau-Bois outdoor base, numerous chores made it possible to remove approximately two tons of waste left on the islands by unsupervised human activities. Among the initiatives deployed for cleaning up the islands, latrines have been set up on several islands.

In 2008, the Poisson Blanc Regional Park was officially created. Reservation of campsites on the islands will begin in 2009. In 2010, the park adds canoe and kayak rental services. Between 2008 and 2012, park workers set up a system of supervision and monitoring of activities on the islands of the reservoir. In addition, the park has developed approximately 10 kilometres (6.2 mi) of hiking trails in Devil's Mountain. At the start of the 2012 season, the Le Bastion reception pavilion was inaugurated.

== Activities ==
The park is open year round. Several hiking trails in the Poisson Blanc Regional Park are accessible by car from the parking lot in the Rapide-du-Fort sector and the Lac Cuillèrier sector. These trails are located on the Fort mountain.

The park offers hiking trails in the island sector of Poisson-Blanc Lake; these trails are accessible only by using a water craft. On the islands, at the end of each hiking route, hikers will have a striking glance of the Poisson Blanc reservoir. In winter, users can go snowshoeing.

Many park users canoe/kayak/sup-camping on the Poisson-Blanc Lake. Exercise practitioners can then stop for picnics, swimming or relaxing in the sun on the wild beaches. To accommodate users, the park offers a canoe, kayak and paddleboard rental service at Bastien, the park's reception pavilion in Notre-Dame-du-Laus.

== Accommodation ==
This regional park is offering 17 picnic stops on the islands of the reservoir. It offers also camping sites on the islands and in micro-shelters in the forest.

The Grand-Pic (accommodating 4 peoples) is a micro-refuge design for rooted in nature and is located at the end of the Pointe de la Truite. This strategic site is bordered on all sides by the Poisson-Blanc Lake. Le Pic-Mineur is a micro-refuge located just a few meters from the Poisson Blanc Reservoir.

== Toponym ==
This toponym is linked to the name of Poisson-Blanc Lake. This name of the lake and the river derives from the fact that white fish are caught there. The toponym "Poisson-Blanc regional park" was formalized on May 13, 2016 at the Place name bank of the Commission de toponymie du Québec.
