= Des Grèves Regional Park =

Park in Quebec, Canada

Parc régional des Grèves
- Interactive map of Parc régional des Grèves
- Nearest city: Contrecoeur, Marguerite-D'Youville Regional County Municipality, Quebec, Canada
- Coordinates: 46°49′21″N 72°09′12″W
- Area: 0.83 kilometres (0.52 mi)
- Established: 2009

The Parc régional des Grèves (in English: Des Grèves Regional Park) is a regional park in Quebec, located on the southeast shore of the St. Lawrence River. Inaugurated in 2011, it is located in the municipalities of Contrecoeur, in the Marguerite-D'Youville Regional County Municipality, in the administrative region of Montérégie, in Quebec, in Canada.

The vocation of this park is to ensure the conservation of the landscapes at the same time as to organize recreational activities. This park is administered by the Solidarity Cooperative of the Grèves regional park.

== Park characteristics ==
Following the territorial expansion of 2020, all the lots protected by different types of conservation agreements occupy an area of 0.83 kilometres (0.52 mi), including about sixty hectares of protected area.

This park is bounded to the northeast by about 2 km from the southeast shore of the St. Lawrence River, by the golf course (east side), the railway.

This park is separated into three zones:

- the one near the St. Lawrence River;
- the one between route 132 and the railway;
- the one along the east side of the railway line.

== Buildings and infrastructures ==
The park has two chalets, namely:

- the Contrecoeur reception, located on the site of Des Grèves Vacation Camp, at 10350 route Marie-Victorin, Contrecoeur J0L 1C0;
- Sorel-Tracy reception, located at 3100, chemin du Golf, Sorel-Tracy, QC, J3R 0E9.

Each chalet has a heritage interpretation site, visitor parking, a first aid station for first aid, basic services for recreational and tourist activities. The distance between the two chalets is 12 km.

Eleven multifunctional trails (walking, cross-country skiing and snowshoeing) have been set up in this park, over more than 14 km. In winter, this park offers 9 km of cross-country ski trails, 5 km of skate ski trails and 9 km of snowshoeing and winter walking trails.

These trails are accessible free of charge over the four seasons. Access is only on foot or, in winter, on snowshoes or cross-country skiing.

All trails are accessible to people with reduced mobility. However, slatted paths do not have safety rails.

== Main activities ==
The park's trails are popular all year round. Visitors to the park can observe the river and the wilderness, take photographs, have a picnic, practice PMR, practice snowshoeing or cross-country skiing.

Several groups organize activities in the park: classes in nature, gathering of seniors, scientific groups (ornithologists, arborists, collectors ...), families, etc.

The park is open from sunrise to sunset. Free entry.

== History ==
In 2006, four partners (Rio Tinto Fer et Titane, the Cégep de Sorel-Tracy, the Colonie des Grèves and the non-profit organization Kinéglobe) joined forces with the towns of Contrecœur and Sorel-Tracy to form the “Cooperative of solidarity of the regional park of Grèves”, which aims to develop this area into a regional park to improve the offer of recreational and tourist activities.

In 2009, the town of Contrecoeur and Nature-Action Québec joined forces to acquire part of the Bois de Contrecoeur, or 65 hectares, which belonged to the Les Grèves summer camp. This acquisition was made financially possible thanks to the participation of the Montreal Metropolitan Community (CMM), the Hydro-Quebec Foundation for the Environment (FHQE), the Ministry of Sustainable Development, Environment and Parks (MDDEP) as well as than the town of Contrecoeur. These partners recognized the exceptional forest ecosystem of the Bois de Contrecoeur.

In 2010, a walk was carried out on the coast of the St. Lawrence River in order to enhance the site while protecting nature. In 2010, the four partners launched the 2.5 million project aimed mainly at developing the hill (site P-84) of mine tailings about 500 meters wide, two kilometers long and 35 meters high. This site, which is located between Autoroute 30 and Route 132, occupies 290 hectares. The objective was then to enhance this site by creating a tourist recreation zone.

In 2016, the Union of Quebec Municipalities (UMQ) jointly awarded the “Your Favorite” prize to the towns of Contrecoeur and Sorel-Tracy to reward their initiatives aimed at developing the Grèves regional park.

In 2019, a grant of $53,000 is granted by the Regional Radiation Support Fund (FARR) to build various facilities in the park while $99,000 is granted for the upgrading of the infrastructure of the summer camp for Strikes. This sum was used in particular for the development of an outdoor climbing wall, the addition of two new interpretation stations, the installation of new outdoor furniture for the rest areas, and the redevelopment of the parking lot in the pavilion. reception of Sorel-Tracy, in order to promote recreational and tourist activities, in particular by improving infrastructures on the interpretation of nature.

In November 2019, a perpetual conservation easement was granted on eight lots acquired since 2009. This initiative is part of the sustainable development of the city of Contrecoeur in order to preserve the natural state of the Parc des Grèves.

In 2020, thanks to an investment of $190,000 made jointly by the city of Contrecoeur and Nature-Action Quebec, the conservation area of the regional park will expand by 15 hectares on the territory of Contrecoeur. This expansion for environmental purposes concerns two lots with joint ownership agreement.

This 2020 acquisition is part of the “Green and blue network of Greater Montreal” which aims to protect and enhance natural environments, landscapes and built heritage. It is an integrated and global perspective, which is based on local initiatives at the scale of Greater Montreal.

== See also ==
- Sainte-Jeanne-d'Arc Vacation camp
- Regional Park (Quebec)
