= Appalaches Regional Park =

Protected area in Chaudière-Appalaches, Quebec, Canada

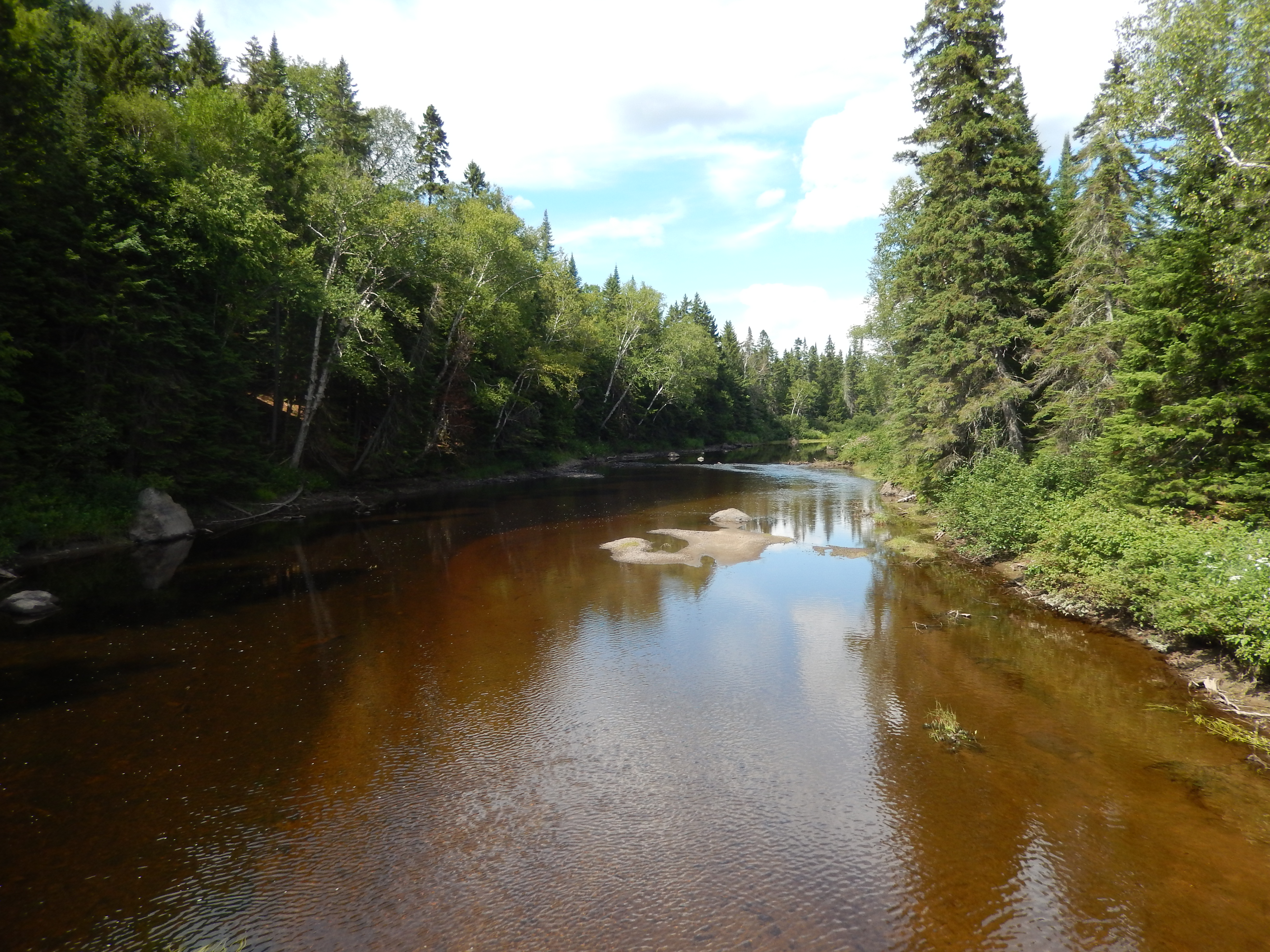
- Rivière Noire Nord-Ouest dans le parc.

- Location within Quebec
- Location: Canada, Quebec, Chaudière-Appalaches, Montmagny Regional County Municipality
- Nearest city: Montmagny
- Coordinates: 46.74305°N 70.10278°W
- Created: 1997
- Named for: The ranges of mountains where it is located
- Administrator: PARC RÉGIONAL DES APPALACHES
- Website: www.parcappalaches.com

The Parc régional des Appalaches (in English: Appalaches Regional Park) is a regional park located in Montmagny Regional County Municipality in the region of Chaudière-Appalaches, in Quebec, Canada. This park includes lakes, forests, rivers, marshes, peat bogs and mountains.

== Mission ==
The "Parc régional des Appalaches" is a non-profit organization registered on 10 January 1997 at Registre des entreprises du Québec and its head-office is at Sainte-Lucie-de-Beauregard.

== Toponymy ==
The toponym "Parc régional des Appalaches" derives from the mountain range where it is located.

The toponym "Parc régional des Appalaches" was registered as of 28 September 2004 at the "Banque de noms de lieux" of Commission de toponymie du Québec.

== Activities ==
Created in 1997, in the heart of the Appalachian forest, the Appalachian Park is made up of many natural sites where we find eskers, waterfalls, peat bogs, lakes, rivers, mountains, the highest of which is the Grande Coulée Mountain (853 metres (2,799 ft)), Sugar Loaf Mountain (650 metres (2,130 ft)) and Talon Lake mountain (580 metres (1,900 ft)). You will therefore find hiking trails, cycle paths and a canoe route in the summer season. In winter, snowshoeing and snow scooters are practiced on several trails in the Park. All the trails are adorned with sidewalks, stairs, walkways, gazebos and shelters, as well as resort infrastructure such as rustic or serviced campsites and shelters.

For their accommodation in the park, visitors can choose from a network of campsites, huts and cabins.

The network of hiking trails allows to be in contact with the wild nature and to view panoramas of lakes, rivers and mountains. Trails allow you to climb Mount Sugard Loaf and Montagne Grande Coulée, to their respective summit. Around thirty arched or suspended footbridges have been fitted out on the hiking trails to span rivers or bodies of water.

== Footpaths ==
The park has a network of 140 km of hiking trails.

| Number | Name | Length | Sector |
|---|---|---|---|
| 1 | Lac-Talon Trail | 6 kilometres (3.7 mi) | Saint-Fabien hiking trails |
| 2 | Érablière trail | 2 kilometres (1.2 mi) | Saint-Fabien hiking trails |
| 3 | Chutes-du-Ruisseau-des-Cèdres Trail | 3.5 kilometres (2.2 mi) | Saint-Fabien hiking trails |
| 4 | Petit-Lac-des-Vases trail | 4 kilometres (2.5 mi) | Saint-Fabien hiking trails |
| 5 | Chutes-de-la-Devost Trail | 2.5 kilometres (1.6 mi) | Saint-Fabien hiking trails |
| 6 | Portage Trail | 2.5 kilometres (1.6 mi) | Saint-Fabien hiking trails |
| 7 | Moose Trail | 16 kilometres (9.9 mi) | Grande-Coulée Mountain |
| 8 | Path of the Walls | 2.5 kilometres (1.6 mi) | Saint-Fabien hiking trails |
| 9 | Hill Path | 3.5 kilometres (2.2 mi) | Lac Carré |
| 10 | Pont-Brûlé trail | 6 kilometres (3.7 mi) | Sugar Loaf Mountain |
| 11 | Sentier du Garde-Feu | 3 kilometres (1.9 mi) | Sugar Loaf Mountain |
| 12 | Le Beauregard Trail | 6.5 kilometres (4.0 mi) | Sugar Loaf Mountain |
| 14 | Beaver Trail | 6 kilometres (3.7 mi) | Sugar Loaf Mountain |
| 15 | Le Trappeur Trail | 4 kilometres (2.5 mi) | Peat bogs of Saint-Just-de-Bretenières |
| 16 | Le Frontalier Trail | 4 kilometres (2.5 mi) | Peat bogs of Saint-Just-de-Bretenières |
| 17 | Peatland Trail | 5 kilometres (3.1 mi) | Peat bogs of Saint-Just-de-Bretenières |
| 18 | Le Petit-Maine Trail | 16.5 kilometres (10.3 mi) | Peat bogs of Saint-Just-de-Bretenières |
| 19 | Ghost Trail | 3 kilometres (1.9 mi) | Grande-Coulée Mountain |
| 20 * | Abris-sous-Roches trail | 1 kilometre (0.62 mi) | Grande-Coulée Mountain |
| 21 * | Le Lien Trail | 2 kilometres (1.2 mi) | Grande-Coulée Mountain |
| 22 | Le Serpentin Trail | 1 kilometre (0.62 mi) | Grande-Coulée Mountain |
| 23 | Le Raccourci Trail | 1 kilometre (0.62 mi) | Sugar Loaf Mountain |
| 24 * | The Return Trail | 2 kilometres (1.2 mi) | Grande-Coulée Mountain |
| 25 | Cabourons trail | 0.8 kilometres (0.50 mi) | Saint-Fabien hiking trails |
| 26 | Le Pêcheur Trail | 2 kilometres (1.2 mi) | Saint-Fabien hiking trails |
| 27 | Eskers Trail | 4 kilometres (2.5 mi) | Grande-Coulée Mountain |
| 28 | Le Parcours-des-Caps trail | 4 kilometres (2.5 mi) | Saint-Fabien hiking trails |
| 44 * | Le Merisier Trail | 5 kilometres (3.1 mi) | The Grouse Garden |
| 46 * | Le Bûché trail | 4 kilometres (2.5 mi) | The Grouse Garden |
| 48 * | Le Geai-Gris Trail | 48 kilometres (30 mi) | The Grouse Garden |
| | Cascades-de-la-Loutre Trail | 2 kilometres (1.2 mi) | Waterfalls of the Otter |
| | Le Défricheur Trail | 9 kilometres (5.6 mi) | Sugar Loaf Mountain |
| | Montagne-du-Lac trail | 3 kilometres (1.9 mi) | Lake Mountain |

* Winter trail only
