= Bell River =

Bell River may refer to:

- Bell River (New South Wales), Australia
- Bell River (Quebec), Canada
- Bell River (Yukon), a river of Yukon, Canada
- Bell River (South Africa)
- Bell River (Michigan), USA
- Paleo-Bell River, hypothesised former river in northern North America

== See also ==
- Belle River (disambiguation)
