= Chute-à-Bull Regional Park =

Protected area in Lanaudière, Quebec, Canada

- Location within Quebec
- Location: Canada, Quebec, Lanaudière, Matawinie Regional County Municipality
- Nearest town: Saint-Côme
- Coordinates: 46.30722°N 73.75889°W
- Created: 2003
- Administrator: Société de développement des parcs régionaux de la Matawinie (SDPRM).
- Website: www.parcsregionaux.org/parcs-regionaux/parcs/parc-regional-de-la-chute-a-bull/

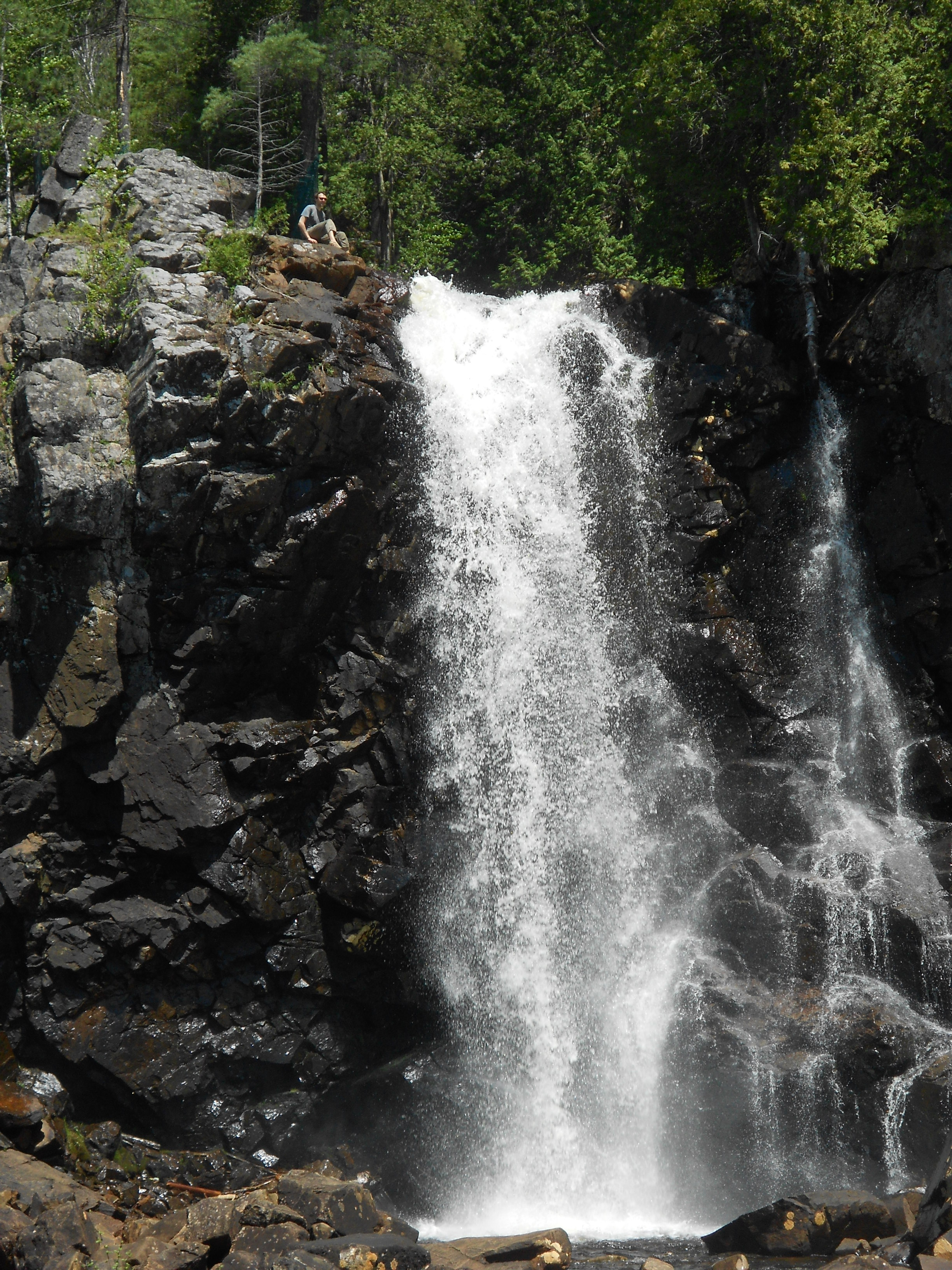
Chute-à-Bull waterfall

The Chute-à-Bull Regional Park (in French: Parc régional de la Chute-à-Bull) is a regional park bordering the rivière de la Boule and is located in the municipality of Saint-Côme, in the Matawinie Regional County Municipality, in administrative region of Lanaudière, in Quebec, in Canada.

This park is administered by the Matawinie Regional Parks Development Corporation (SDPRM) which is a non-profit organization and whose head office is located at 1661A, rue Principale, Saint-Côme, Quebec, J0K 2B0. The SDPRM was registered on April 7, 2008 in the Quebec enterprise register.

== Geography ==
The park is crossed by the rivière de la Boule (Boule River), a tributary of the L'Assomption River. The park covers an area in the shape of a rectangle. At the western end, the park begins at Lac Guénard. The access road is on the northwest side.

== Activities ==
This park is open year round. The access point to the park is located at: 46.3082°N 73.7605°W The reception desk has a tourist information service.

The park has four marked trails:

- Trapper trail: 0.6 kilometres (0.37 mi) for beginners with a loop route;
- Chute trail: 1.1 kilometres (0.68 mi) mixed type for beginners;
- Dame du Milieu trail: 1.6 kilometres (0.99 mi) of mixed type for beginners;
- Belvédère trail: 2 kilometres (1.2 mi) with a vertical drop of 100 metres (330 ft) with a loop route for beginners. The Belvédère trail leads to a viewpoint at the top of the mountain via a covered bridge.

These trails have nature interpretation panels, some dealing with the life of workers in the days of the log drive, vestiges of which can be seen along the trails. The trails of this park cross a forest of spruce, white pine and red pine. In addition to the main fall, 18 m high, we will see several small falls and waterfalls. The park connects to the Boule trail (3.9 km connecting trail).

== Accommodation ==
The park offers accommodation in three shelters whose style recalls the lives of forestry workers:

- Camp des Draveurs: capacity of 4 people with a distance of 0.4 km (summer) or 0.7 km (winter) from reception desk;
- Camp du Gardien: capacity of 4 people with a distance of 0.2 km (summer) and 0.5 km (winter) from reception desk
- Camp du Belvédère: capacity of 6 people, with a distance of 1.1 km (summer) and 1.4km (winter) from reception desk.

Each refuge is equipped with a wood stove. During the day, the refuges are places used as a rest stop by hikers.

== Toponym ==
This waterfall and the adjacent park were named in honor of an American who operated them annually during the spring logging period. This park was laid out to commemorate the time of the "drave". This toponym was made official on September 24, 2003 at the Place Names Bank of the Commission de toponymie du Québec.
