= Beauharnois-Salaberry Regional Park =

Protected area in Montérégie, Quebec, Canada

- Location within Quebec
- Location: Canada, Quebec, Montérégie, Beauharnois-Salaberry Regional County Municipality
- Nearest city: Beauharnois, Salaberry-de-Valleyfield
- Coordinates: 46.74305°N 70.10278°W
- Established: 1996

The Beauharnois-Salaberry Regional Park (in French: Parc régional Beauharnois-Salaberry) is a regional park located in the Beauharnois-Salaberry Regional County Municipality, in administrative region of Montérégie, in Quebec, in Canada.

The primary mission of the regional park is to enhance the banks of the Beauharnois Canal. It constitutes a vast recreational and leisure facility; it is accessible to all for the practice of outdoor activities and healthy lifestyles. It offers river and nice country landscapes.

== Geography ==
Less than an hour from downtown Montreal, this linear park is located on the south shore of the St. Lawrence River, southwest of Montreal.

== History ==
During the economic crisis of the 1930s, the major pipeline project was carried out between lakes Saint-François and Saint-Louis. This project aims to establish the St. Lawrence Seaway in the heart of the current territory of the MRC of Beauharnois-Salaberry. This project on the St. Lawrence River lasted 3 years. This canal stretches for nearly 25 kilometers in length and up to one kilometer in width in places. This canal was intended to supply the “Beauharnois” hydroelectric power station and subsequently to serve the St. Lawrence Seaway.

Subsequently, for about sixty years, the banks of the seaway remained abandoned and/or inaccessible, depending on the location. During the 1990s, thanks to cooperation between partners, the Beauharnois-Salaberry Regional Park became a reality. Consequently, citizens are reclaiming the shores of the St. Lawrence, with new access to vast natural, nautical, riparian and wooded areas. The very first cycle section of this park was inaugurated in 1996. The infrastructures, equipment and services of the Park are continuously developing; it links the two urban poles of the MRC and branches out to all of its rural municipalities.

== Activities ==
This park offers 70 km (43 mi) of flat asphalt and multifunctional trails along the Beauharnois Canal for cyclists, pedestrians and inline skaters. It is aimed at outdoor enthusiasts, cycling or boating enthusiasts.

This park offers services and equipments:

- 2 Launching ramps ("Halte des Plaisanciers" and "Halte des Villages")
- 4 Quays ("Halte des Villages Est and Ouest", "Halte de la Presqu'île", "Halte des Plaisisseurs")
- 13 Stopovers and stops accessible on foot, by bike or by car for picnicking, observing nature or fishing
- Composting sanitary shelters
- 4 observation towers
- 9 parking lots
- Bike patrol
- Patrol Sécuri-Parc
- Short-term accommodation for recreational vehicles (Halte des Plaisanciers) and watercraft (Halte des Villages Ouest and Halte de la Presqu'île).

== Toponymy ==
The toponym "Parc linéaire de la MRC-de-Beauharnois-Salaberry" was officialized as of February 2, 2005 at the "Banque de noms de lieux" of Commission de toponymie du Québec.
