= Des Grèves Vacation Camp =

Quebec summer camp

- Location within Quebec
- Location: 10350, route Marie-Victorin, Contrecoeur, QC, J0L 1C0, Canada
- Coordinates: 45°58′36″N 73°10′53″W
- Elevation: 14
- Type: Family camp and summer camp
- Restaurants: Cafétéria
- Season: 4 seasons camp
- Operated by: Colonie de vacances des Grèves inc.
- Owner: Colonie de vacances des Grèves inc.
- Established: 1912
- Website: www.coloniedesgreves.com

The Colonie de vacances des Grèves (English: "Des Grèves Vacation Camp"), established in 1912, is the oldest vacation camp still in operation in Quebec and French-Canada. Today, this colony is renowned as the largest French-speaking summer camp still in operation in North America.

This family and children's holiday camp is located at Cap de la Victoire, on the south-eastern shore of the St. Lawrence River, in the First Concession, in the town of Contrecoeur, in the regional county municipality (MRC) of Marguerite-D'Youville Regional County Municipality, in the administrative region of Montérégie, in province of Quebec, in Canada.

== Mission ==
The first mission of this vacation camp was to provide children from economically weak and less fortunate backgrounds in Montreal with the means to have a healthy recreation in the great outdoors and enjoy a beneficial vacation. The camp allows children to be introduced to different sports, plastic arts, crafts, etc., under the supervision of qualified instructors. The objective was to flee the disease of cities where tuberculosis was rife that medical science could not fight effectively.

In 1921, the motto of the Colony was in Latin: “Mens sana in corpore sano” (A healthy mind in a healthy body).

Today, the mission of the Colonie des Grèves de Contrecoeur is to offer all children, regardless of their economic situation, a place of leisure and culture where they can fully develop and flourish. Thus, the camp offers a range of services related to the field of recreation for families and young people, even in groups. The camp officially conveys the fundamental values: respect for oneself, for others and for one's environment, cooperation and empowerment.

"Des Grèves Vacation Colony" is accredited by the "Association des Camps du Québec" (Quebec Camps Association).

== Activities and services offered ==
The Colonie des Grèves offers:

- a special program of activities during spring break (usually late February or early March);
- a summer day camp program for children aged 5 to 12, including entertainment and day care;
- group and family accommodation;
- outdoor activities, as 30,000 people per year walk the trails of the Grèves regional park for walking, snowshoeing or cross-country skiing;
- general public activities;
- the rental of rooms as a place for meetings and reunions, such as weddings, family celebrations, work meetings, holiday party.

In winter, the camp offers access to the Parc régional des Grèves (English: Des Grèves Regional Park), for sporting activities such as cross-country skiing, snowshoeing, sliding, walking, a mini farm and an ice rink. The camp also offers tube sliding with sliding corridors.

The camp management decreed in March 2020 the suspension of camp activities for an indefinite period, following the imposition of health measures by the government of Quebec as part of the fight against the global pandemic of Coronavirus COVID-19. Consequently, the summer 2020 program only included day camps, in addition to municipal programs, in particular a camp for 4-year-olds, a camp specializing in sailing and, alternately, a natural science camp, survival in the forest. and life-size. In addition, the musical camps of the Chasse-galerie and the end of summer camps have been back.

== Customers ==
In 1925, the number of small settlers rose to 693, divided into two contingents: that of July and that of August.

For the summer of 1929, the colony had 935 registrations and 72,000 meals served. It maintains seven holiday camps with thirteen vast buildings.

In 1936, the Camp des Grèves welcomed 2,000 boys for its outdoor activities. This holiday camp was then financially supported by the "Fédération des Œuvres de Charité Canadiennes-Françaises" (Federation of French Canadian Charities), which held a fundraising campaign every spring.

Before leaving for the colony, each "settler" was weighed at the École Normale Jacques Cartier, and upon his return; The objective was to assess the colon's weight gain during his stay at the colony, which was considered a guarantee of physical health at the time. At the time, from Longueuil, the train was the most convenient means of transport for settlers (campers) and staff, calling for a stop at Cap de la Victoire.

The Colonie de Vacances des Grèves was reserved for boys, at least until 1956. Since the summer of 1967, the Colonie des Grèves has welcomed 900 children (boys and girls) per day at the summer day camp. They are transported daily by bus. This day camp was then reserved for children from low-income families living in parishes located near the Jacques-Cartier, Victoria, Champlain and Tunnel H.-Lafontaine bridges. This summer program was then subsidized by the Federation of French-Canadian Charities.

Throughout its history, this summer camp has been especially dedicated to children from underprivileged backgrounds in the Montreal region. From 1995 to 2000, the colony opened to residents of the Sorel - Contrecoeur region.

Since at least 1995, the colony has been organizing an open house every spring to publicize the staff, the site, the equipment, the type of accommodation and the activity areas of the camp.

== Owner ==
In 1915, the Sulpician community adopted the Colony. A company was incorporated by letters patent, under the presidency of Monsignor Georges Gauthier. In 1915, the colony's postal address was: Cap de la Victoire, parish of Saint-Roch du Richelieu. The administrative headquarters are at the École Normale Jacques Cartier, Parc Lafontaine, Montreal.

The “Colonie de vacances des Grèves” is a non-profit organization founded on April 13, 1933 under the Law on Recreation Clubs; this entity will operate until May 30, 2008.

At the same time, the “Domaine des Pins” was established in 1979. The "Domaine des Pins de Contrecoeur" was registered on February 13, 1995 until May 30, 2008, as a non-profit organization. The two entities merged under a new entity called “Colonie de vacances des Grèves” which was registered under part 3 of the Companies Act on May 30, 2008 in the Quebec enterprise register.

This new non-profit organization owns the building where the camp is located and operates it as a summer camp. According to the register, the Greves Vacation Colony offers leisure & cultural activities for young people, and leisure & hotel activities for families. This organization is headed by a board of directors.

== Sponsors ==
Since its founding, the activities, infrastructures and buildings of the Colony of Grèves have been financed thanks to:

- various fundraising activities, especially in Montreal, such as church collections, plays, concerts...;
- excursions (by train and / or boat) especially from Montreal and to the colony;
- grants from the Commission scolaire de Montréal, and large charitable organizations.

In 1926, the colonists generally did not pay a pension and benefited from the aid granted by various institutions, such as the Society of Saint Vincent de Paul, the City of Montreal, the Montreal Catholic School Commission, the Bruchési Institute and various specific organizations.

In the 1930s, the main organizations subsidizing the Colony of Grèves were the "Fédération des Oeuvres sociales de santé" (English: Federation of Social Health Works) and the "Fédération des Oeuvres de charité canadienne-française" (English: Federation of French Canadian Charities). The latter was merged in 1966 with other organizations to form Centraide Montreal, which continued to subsidize the colony.

The Cercle social Ville-Marie was founded in 1935 in Montreal with the mission of financing the "Les Grèves" holiday camp. From 1936 to 1942, the financial support of this social circle allowed the erection of the Souvenir pavilion (renamed Pavillon Père-Savignac), the Saint-Jean, SS.-Anges, Sainte-Jeanne d'Arc, Saint-Joseph dormitories and Saint-Jean Baptiste, a summer kitchen for the guardian and a "Solitude" for the seminarian-supervisors. In 1943, this funding allowed the construction of a "wash house", the improvement of the Kiwanis kitchen and the ornamentation of the chapel.

Since the 1990s, Quebec vacation camps have been subsidized by the Quebec government, via the Ministry of Education, Recreation and Sports for the operating and immobilization components. In 1995, the camp was also subsidized by Centraide and the Ministry of Municipal Affairs.

== Buildings and infrastructures ==
In 1926, the installations of the Greves colony included a chapel, a seminary where the ecclesiastics lived, a refectory for the supervisors and one for the colonists, as well as five dormitories where the children slept in double beds (like a boat bed).

In 1978, the colony could accommodate up to 626 people in the camp at the same time, including 126 members of staff, monitors, cooks, maintenance and administration workers.

In 2020, the Grèves Vacation Colony can accommodate up to 170 people in seven chalets, two inns or the 40-person Robert-Moore dormitory located in the main lodge. Auberge Édouard-Gouin can accommodate up to 23 people and has 14 rooms. Auberge Édouard-Gagnon can accommodate up to 44 people and has seven rooms for six people. It can accommodate groups of up to 200 people. This colony offers five meeting rooms for rent, with or without meal service.

In 1975, the colony covered approximately 2.6 kilometres (1.62 mi).

== Regional Park of Grèves ==
Des Greves Vacation Colony is connected to the "Parc régional des Grèves", which is located southwest of the village of Contrecoeur and northwest of autoroute 30. This park includes an exceptional forest with marshes, peat bogs and hundred-year-old pine groves on the shores of the St. Lawrence River. Visitors can observe the flora and fauna. The marked trails stretch for 14 kilometres (8.7 mi) for hiking, including the 1.4 kilometres (0.87 mi) overwater footbridge. In winter, this park offers 10 kilometres (6.2 mi) trails for snowshoeing and 9 kilometres (5.6 mi) for cross-country skiing.

This park has two entrances: the Sorel-Tracy reception (Jean-Paul Dubois chalet) and the Contrecoeur reception (Colonie des Grèves). This L-shaped playpen has two parts:

- northern part (between the river and the railway): the camp facilities, the skating rink and the La Savoyane observatory with a view of the river are located north of Route 132; while the mini farm, slide and hebertism trails are located between Route 132 and the railway line;
- part located to the south of the railway line; including the tailings yard, hebertism trails, cross-country ski and snowshoe trails, as well as walking trails.

This regional park has a conservation area (western part) of the site and the bird larder (vegetated area) on the south side of the railway line. It is a nature interpretation center, including interpretation stations and the reception pavilion. This park offers year-round activities including canoeing, a water body without a beach, an outdoor swimming pool, horseback riding, a playground with equipment, sliding, skating, snowshoeing and cross-country skiing.

The management of sports and outdoor recreational tourism activities in the park is assumed by the Coopérative de solidarité du Parc régional des Grèves, which was registered on September 8, 2006 in the Quebec enterprise register, in accordance with the Cooperatives Act.

== Battle of Champlain at Cap de la Victoire in 1610 ==
On June 19, 1610, the Montagnais, the Algonquins and French soldiers led by Samuel de Champlain began a battle at Cap de la Victoire (designated Cap Massacre by some authors), against a hundred Iroquois who had erected a strategic fort there. The Iroquois had built a circular barricade made of tree trunks joined by sturdy stakes fixed in the ground. During the French assault on the barricade, Champlain was seriously wounded in the neck by an arrow. Many Iroquois fell in battle or drowned in the general salvage.

The site of this battle is found at the eastern edge of the Parish of Contrecoeur, about 8.0 kilometres (5.0 mi) southwest of Sorel, on the borders of the Seigneury of Saint-Ours. This site is part of the Grèves Holiday Colony, which is in front of the Jeanne-d'Arc dormitory. This course was broken over about twenty years at the end of the 19th century and the beginning of the 20th century by the operation of a sand pit whose sand was transported on the river by barge. An indigenous trail of approximately 3.5 kilometres (2.2 mi) linked the Cap de la Victoire and the Richelieu river, of which approximately 0.6 kilometres (0.37 mi) crosses a savannah.

== History of the summer camp ==
In 1911, the Holiday Colony at Nominingue was founded by the Brothers of Saint-Vincent de Paul from the parish of Saint-Georges, following the initiative taken a few years earlier by their colleagues from the Patronage in Quebec. This initiative inspired Father Desrosiers, a secular priest from Lanoraie, to establish a similar project in Contrecoeur.

=== Period for boys: 1912-1967 ===
In 1912, Father Adélard Desrosiers (1873-1953) bought on July 4 a strip of land of 20 arpents on a sandy and relatively sterile domain, for $1,500, the equivalent of three years salary for a worker. This lot, which belonged to his aunts, is located at Cap de la Victoire on the banks of the St. Lawrence River, south-west of the village of Contrecoeur, that is to say in the direction of Saint-Laurent-sur-le-Fleuve. Through his family, Desrosiers knows this area well. Desrosiers founded the Les Grèves summer camp with his brother Arthur, then a seminarian and a friend MA Ladouceur.

This concept of a boys' vacation camp was inspired by European summer camps where children were taken to the sea (to the strike). It is also inspired by the Summer camps of New England, as well as the summer activities (Summer camps, Weekends and picnics) organized by the Association of Young Christian People YMCA, and the “Summer outings” organized by the "Outdoor companies".

Doctor Landouzy, dean of the Faculty of Medicine of Paris, specialist in tuberculosis, affirmed that “childcare through school colonies is like the first line of defense against tuberculosis, the second including the sanatorium and the third hospitals. It is indisputable that the strongest and the most important is currently the first”.

At this site at Cap de la Victoire, in July 1912, Father Desrosiers hosted six orphan boys from Montreal in a tent. And he immediately had a plank house built with donations of materials from people around. The Les Grèves holiday camp was inaugurated on August 18, 1912. In 1913, 90 boarders followed one another at Abbé Desrosiers' camp. A new building was added each following year.

In 1912, Father Adélard Desrosiers worked as vice-principal of the Jacques-Cartier Normal School (girls' section). This institution owned by the Congregation of Notre Dame of Montreal was located at 2330 rue Sherbrooke Ouest and it was in operation from 1913 to June 1969.

As early as 1913, the Montreal Catholic School Commission (French: Commission des écoles catholiques de Montréal) donated $700 to this work with the commitment of the abbot to welcome 75 boys to this camp; the latter will be chosen by the principals of the schools from among the most deserving underprivileged pupils and to provide them with board, board, supervision and games for 27 days. Commissioner Eugène Lafontaine had recommended that the School Board sponsor this holiday camp.

In 1914, the new director of the colony, Father Édouard Gouin built a large dormitory and set up games.

Construction of the first chapel in 1915

At the start of this summer camp, the boys are called by the bell and the whistle. After getting up at 7 a.m., the children first wash their toilet in the river, go to daily mass, have to bathe in the mornings and afternoons, and do a self-examination in the evening before going to sleep. Camp activities include ball games, excursions and stories told by the counselors. Each camper is involved in all the chores required for the good functioning of the camp, in particular the peeling of the potatoes, the cleaning of the ground, the maintenance of the trails, the collection of wood and the setting up of campfires"). The campers also helped transport goods, especially food. Without electricity, the camp had to obtain daily supplies from the village or from nearby residents.

The food is then composed of milk, soupane (oat-based porridge), pea soup, cereals, potatoes, baloney (derived from bologna), sausage, "spring beef", baked beans, fricassee, gibelottes…

In the summer of 1915, the colony's team, which operated over six weeks, consisted of 18 people: director, bursar, masters and supervisors, cook, assistant cook, foreman; only the cook was then paid. The colony then welcomed 142 children, each for three weeks.

In 1915, there were notably the construction of the Chapel of Grèves, a kitchen and the purchase of a refectory tent and rowboats. During the first years, there was the planting of the pine forest along the river; and later oak trees were planted there.

The Sulpicians took charge of the colony from 1912 to 1968 when the colony became secular. Subsequently, Pierre Bougie, a Sulpician, continued to be active in the colony.

In 1921, the colony then had four dormitories, a modest chapel, a refectory and a central house. It could accommodate 225 children at a time. At the end of the 1921 season, more than 2,753 children had been accommodated since the foundation, including 593 in the summer of 1921. In 1921 only more than 30,000 meals were served.

10th anniversary in 1922

The celebration of the 10th anniversary of this colony took place on August 12 and 13, 1922 on the site of the Greves colony. This celebration included a pageant of 250 children illustrating the heroic fight of Dollard des Ormeaux and a second pageant illustrating the battle of Champlain against the Iroquois at Cap de la Victoire, or on the site of the Colonie des Grèves.

Founding of the Colonie Sainte-Jeanne d'Arc for girls

At the same time, in 1926, Father Desrosiers acquired land near the first camp to meet the needs of girls. This twin colony created in 1926 is called Colonie Ste-Jeanne d’Arc.

In 1927, Mr. Lionel Lanthier acted as president of the Association des Anciens Colons des Grèves.

In 1931, there was the construction of the 2nd chapel thanks to fundraising campaigns in Montreal; a fire destroyed it in the summer of 1982.

On August 15, 1940, Édouard Gagnon (1918–2007), Sulpician P.S.S., was ordained a priest in the small chapel of the Les Grèves summer camp, of which he was then the director.

Drownings in 1933

On September 9, 1933, four members of the Cercle paroissial de Saint-Zotique, located in the Saint-Henri district of Montreal, drowned. The accident occurred in the middle of the river in front of Lanoraie and the Colonie des Grèves de Contrecoeur.

After the community supper at the Colony of Grèves, seven young adults and campers left in a rowboat for a walk on the river. They first crossed the river to go to the little circus in Lanoraie. On their return, immediately after having crossed the channel, the group had to endure the waves caused by the passage of the Clarke company ship Gaspésia and the wind. A wave capsized the rowboat. A lifeguard on the shore rescued three survivors with his canoe.

In 1933, the Kiwanis Club of Montreal donated $5,000 to the colony for the construction of a pavilion including a dormitory, dining hall and kitchen. This two-winged pavilion was inaugurated in mid-August 1933.

25th anniversary in 1937

As part of the 25th anniversary of the colony, celebrated on July 25, 1937, a monument was inaugurated, donated by the Association of Elders of the Colony. Leaving Montreal, participants (especially former settlers and supervisors) could get to the party by CNR train from Bonaventure station or by steamer Beloeil (leaving from Victoria quay). In 1937, in the theater building, the fathers presented the children with humoristic plays.

=== Mixed clientele period (boys and girls): from 1967 ===
Since 1967, the Grèves colony has been welcoming boys and girls, as much for the monitors as the campers, as much for the day camps as for the stays.

In 1970, the camp offered a vast program of activities: big games, sports, hebertism, rowboat rides, camping, crafts, natural sciences, folklore dancing, etc. The swimming pool, almost Olympic, was built during this period.

Art studio, theater and chapel fires

On July 17, 1974, a fire destroyed the building where the art studio was housed. On July 18, 1974, another fire destroyed a building that once housed a theater in the Colony; they had then been used as a warehouse for two years, in particular to store chairs and tables on the ground. Inaugurated in 1934, this theater could accommodate up to 700 children, seated on movable benches. They could also climb the half-timbered walls. Films were shown there several times a week and especially on rainy days. His 16mm sound projector was donated by the Association of Ancients. The theater was not open to the general public and was used for colony activities. There were often plays with elaborate sets. The theater has been active mostly in the 1930s, 1940s and 1950s.

In 1982, there was the fire of the second chapel.

Fête annuelle des flocons (Annual snowflake festival)

Since 2007, the Colony has organized the first Snowflake Festival annually, which generally takes place the 3rd week of January. This includes a night walk. Various other winter activities are then offered: dog sledding, snowshoeing, skating rink, cross-country skiing, pony carousel...

In 2009, 65 hectares of land was sold by the Grèves vacation colony to the city of Contrecoeur and to Nature-Action Québec. This joint acquisition will enhance the value of the Parc régional des Grèves and better protect nature.

100th anniversary in 2012

From August 17 to September 3, 2012, the colony celebrated its 100th anniversary in particular with a commemorative mass and a banquet on August 17, as the colony knew how to serve in the past on important anniversaries. In the festivals of the 1950s, the colony could welcome more than a thousand visitors (parents of the settlers and monitors), during these celebrations which took place three times a summer, on the second Sunday of each of the three colonies. At the time, the Grèves was really still the summer camp for the parishes of southern Montreal, at the same time 700 children and 125 monitors and employees were checked. Since the 1970s, people from the surrounding region have frequented it, and in far fewer numbers than in the past. During this centenary, a historical volume on the colony was published, entitled "Les Grèves 100 years of pleasure and leisure 1912-2012". The co-authors are: Suzanne Parmentier, Andrée Adam, Robert Binette, Guillaume Ducharme Désilets.

As part of the launch of the festivities for Contrecoeur's 350th anniversary, more than 1,350 visitors were registered for the activities of January 19, 2018 organized by the Colonie des Grèves on its site. A one-kilometer night stroll included several entertainment stations and magical lighting, in a fantastic world of tales and legends.

Halloween shows

In addition, each year, the colony organizes the montreuse evenings during Halloween. Costumed children enter rooms decorated or animated by vampires, witches and other monstrous characters.

== Colony leadership and workers ==
The general directors (sometimes referred to as "camp director") of the Colony were:

- 1912 and 1913 - Father Adélard Desrosiers (1873-1953) de Lanoraie. He was inspired by the holiday camps of the time in France, where the objective was to take children out of their urban environment to bring them to the sea.
- 1914 to 1916 - Édouard Gouin, p.s.s., Sulpician priest.
- 1917 to 1943 (25 years) - Mr. Ernest Savignac (1887-1955), p.s.s., priest of Saint-Sulpice. In 1916, he acted as assistant director. In 1933, he was chaplain of the “Colonie des Grès” when there were four drownings on the river in front of the Colony. Savignac really gave greatness to this colony. He founded André Grasset College in 1927 in Montreal.
- 1943 to 1946 - Jean-Paul Laurence, p.s.s., Sulpician priest. He had been involved in the colony since at least 1937.
- 1947 to 1952 - Édouard Gagnon (1918-2007), p.s.s., Sulpician priest was director of the summer camp where he had been ordained priest in the small chapel on August 15, 1940.
- 1953 to 1965 - Robert Moore p.s.s., Sulpician priest.
- 1966 - Hervé Hamel p.s.s., Sulpician priest.
- 1967 - Mr. Leroux.
- 1968 to 1971 - Lionel Ferras, p.s.s., Sulpician priest. In 1970, the camp then had 200 workers, including 140 instructors, 10 swimming instructors, two licensed nurses, specialists in organized recreation, a cook and his helpers. The camp then serves 2,500 meals per day.
- 1972 to 1974 - Pierre Champoux.
- 1975 to 1977 - Yvon Théroux.
- 1978 to 1989 - Gilles Malenfant.
- 1990 - M. Gagnon under the authority of Roger Boyer.
- 1993 to 1996 - Joint management: Camille Baril, Roger Boyer and Madeleine Moor.
- 1997 - Jean-Jacques Saint-Cyr.
- 1998 to 2007 - Madeleine Moore, sister of Robert Moore.
- 2007 and 2008 - Gestion Alter Ego de Sorel.
- 2008 to 2010 - Luc Pépin.
- 2010 to 2019 - Nancy Annie Léveillé.
- 2019 - Luc Malo, interim director.

Note: The colony was ruled by Sulpician priests until 1971.

Maintenance workers

In 1931, Arthur Baril (married to Léonie Guillemette) became responsible for the maintenance of the Greves colony until 1971. The latter notably built the docks with his son Camille Baril, which allowed a better use of the boats (rowboats, pedal boats, sailboats). A cement wall protected the shore from the waves of the river and from the ice. Arthur Baril had also built himself the house at Les Grèves, where his family lived and which served for the colony. Camille Baril succeeded his father in this role of maintenance manager which he exercised from 1971 to 1996. His own son, Pierre Baril, in turn succeeded his father in this same role; and the latter continues to work for the colony. In short, three generations of barrels have followed one another in this role.

In 1941, Napoleon Veillette (1895-1979) (2nd marriage to Blandine Cossette), brother-in-law of Arthur Baril, coming from Saint-Stanislas, came to settle with his family in Saint-Laurent-du-Fleuve (Contrecoeur) to work as a handyman at this summer camp. He notably built dormitories for the colony which welcomed boys during the summer season. The latter did this profession in the service of the colony throughout his career.

== Association of former settlers ==
The Association of Former Settlers of Grèves (French: Association des anciens colons) was created in 1924 by Father Ernest Savignac with the aim of having devoted and voluntary lay arms. The leaders of this association organized in particular on August 9, 1925 an excursion by car to the Colonie des Grèves in St-Roch-du-Richelieu. In 1927, Mr. Lionel Lanthier acted as president of this association. This association made the erection of a monument to the Grèves on July 25, 1937. In 1941, this association organized an excursion by special train in August to the Grèves colony. This alumni association would have ceased its activities after 1958 for lack of succession.

Generally, this Association organized:

- an annual excursion (by special train, boat or automobile) from Montreal to "Des Greves Vacation Colony" for current and former settlers;
- philanthropic events (e.g. concert in 1928, plays) to collect funds for the development of the Colony.

== Toponymy ==
The toponyms “Grèves vacation camp” and “Grèves regional park” have not yet been formalized by the Commission de toponymie du Québec. The name of the camp is associated with the strike on the southwestern shore of the St. Lawrence River, near the camp. This toponymic designation was assigned by Father Adélard Desrosiers, the founder of the camp. At the start of the 17th century, this area was the site of a clash between Champlain (founder of Quebec) and Native Americans. Since then, this area, which turns out to be a former sand pit, has been designated "Cap de la Victoire" or "Cap Massacre".

== Appendices ==
=== Bibliography ===
- Book "Ernest Savignac et les Grèves", by Adélard Desrosiers, 1873-1953, Montreal, 1953, publisher: Thérien frères Limitée, 83 p.
- Book "Au paradis des petits colons le Père des Grèves" (In the paradise of small settlers, Father des Grèves), by Roland L’Ermite (Father Roland Duhamel, p.s.s., superior of the Montreal Philosophy Seminar).
- Book “Au paradis des petits colons: les scènes de la vie aux Grèves décrites par des directeurs anciens et actuels" (In paradise of the small settlers: the scenes of the life with the Grèves described by former and current directors), preface by Olivier Maurault, Montreal, Imprimerie des Sourds-muets, 1930, 266 p.
- Official site of the Colonie des Grèves.
- Book "Les Grèves 100 ans de plaisir et de loisir 1912-2012" (Les Grèves 100 years of pleasure and leisure 1912-2012), published during the centenary of the Les Grèves summer camp in 2012. Editors: Suzanne Parmentier, André Adam, Robert Binette and Guillaume Ducharme Désilets. 212 pages. Abundantly illustrated. Note: Historical volume distributed by the Colonie des Grèves.
- Press review of the history of the Les Grèves summer camp, compiled in 2020 by historian Gaétan Veillette.

=== Related Articles ===
- Contrecoeur, a town
- St. Lawrence River
- Colonie de vacances Sainte-Jeanne d'Arc
- Des Grèves Regional Park
- List of summer camps (in the world)
