= Mount Sir-Wilfrid =

Mount in Laurentides, in Quebec, Canada

- 1 Sommet du Diable–783 m (2,569 ft); 2 Summit of Beelzebub–749 m (2,457 ft); 3 Top of the Fireguard–756 m (2,480 ft); 4 Summit of Dawn Wall–740 m (2,430 ft)

Highest point
- Peak: Sommet du Diable
- Elevation: 783
- Coordinates: 46.688333°N 75.593611°W

Geography
- Country: Canada
- Province: Quebec
- Administrative region: Laurentides
- Regional County Municipality (MRC): Antoine-Labelle Regional County Municipality
- Parent range: Laurentian Mountains

Mount Sir-Wilfrid (formerly "Montagne du Diable") is located in the Montagne-du-Diable Regional Park, south-east of the Baskatong Reservoir, in the Hautes-Laurentides region, in the municipality of Ferme-Neuve, in Antoine-Labelle Regional County Municipality (MRC), in Laurentides (region), in Quebec, in Canada.

== Geography ==
The summit of this mountain (Sommet du Diable at 783 m (2,569 ft)) is located at about 15 km (9.3 mi) northwest of Mont-Laurier and near Lake Windigo. In this sector of the Laurentian Mountains, the relief form an oblong mass of about 8 by 5 km (5.0 by 3.1 mi).

The summit has four peaks:

- Sommet du Diable (the top of the Devil): 783 metres (2,569 feet);
- the top of Belzébuth: 749 metres (2,457 feet);
- the top of the Garde-feu: 756 metres (2,480 feet);
- the top of the Dawn Wall: 740 metres (2,430 feet).

== History ==
According to a legend, this mountain is haunted by the Wendigo or Windigo, an evil spirit from Algonquin mythology.

Popularly, this mountain is designated "Montagne du Diable", a French adaptation of the old term Windigo used in this area to designate the stream and the lake. The toponymic designation Sir-Wilfrid was assigned in 1932; this designation is similar to the toponym Mont-Laurier, which the town is nearby. This toponymic designation evokes the memory of Wilfrid Laurier (1841–1919), Prime Minister of Canada, from 1896 to 1911.

== Montagne-du-Diable Regional Park ==
The mount Sir-Wilfrid is the main mountain of the Montagne-du-Diable Regional Park. This park offers many activities and services to visitors who are fond of mountain hiking.

== Toponymy ==
This mount was named in honor of Prime Minister of Canada Wilfrid Laurier.

The toponym "Mont Sir-Wilfrid" was made official on December 5, 1968, at the Place names bank of the Commission de toponymie du Québec.

== See also ==
- Montagne-du-Diable Regional Park
- List of mountains of Quebec
