= Sept-Chutes Regional Park =

Protected area in Lanaudière, Quebec, Canada

- Parc régional des Sept-Chutes
- Location within Quebec
- Location: Canada, Quebec, Lanaudière, Matawinie Regional County Municipality
- Nearest town: Saint-Zénon
- Coordinates: 46.46667°N 73.72222°W

The Sept-Chutes Regional Park (in French: Parc régional des Sept-Chutes) is a regional park located in the municipality of Saint-Zénon, in the Matawinie Regional County Municipality, in administrative region of Lanaudière, in Quebec, in Canada.

== Activities ==
This park is open year-round. The park offers various services, including nature interpretation panels, picnic tables and the sale of snacks and outdoor accessories (crampons, etc.).

The park has six marked trails:

- Le Voile de la mariée trail: 2.0 kilometres (1.2 mi) for beginners and intermediates;
- Michel Sokolyk trail: 3.8 kilometres (2.4 mi) for intermediates;
- Mont Barrière trail: 6.7 kilometres (4.2 mi) for intermediates;
- Lc Rémi trail: 4.9 kilometres (3.0 mi) for beginners and intermediates;
- Mont Brossard trail: 6.7 kilometres (4.2 mi) for intermediates;
- Mont Brossard trail (with short cut): 5.2 kilometres (3.2 mi) for intermediates.

Note: the length indicated turns out to be the total round-trip distance, either from the reception station (place of departure) to the place of arrival (reception station). In winter, snowshoeing is a popular practice.

The trails in this park are characterized by still wild nature. Each trail is marked and includes several nature interpretation panels to inform visitors about the rich flora and fauna of the park and the peculiarities of its panoramas.

The path along the tumultuous Black River passes near the "Veil de la Mariée" waterfall, which is 60 meters (200 feet) high. This same path leads to little Lac Guy. From there, visitors can take the respective trails of Mont Brassard and Barrière.

The Mont Brassard (summit: 655 metres (2,149 ft)) trail offers magnificent panoramas of the high hills of Saint-Zénon, the valley of the Noire River and of Lake Rémi. This trail leads the hiker to the top of a rocky peak overlooking Route 131 and the cliffs of Lac Rémi. At this point, the hiker is 365 meters (1,200 feet) above the elevation of the road and 590 meters (1,935 feet) above sea level! On the course, the hiker meets a pine forest with red pines and a forest of black spruce, called "black spruce".

The Mont Barrière trail involves going through different ecosystems, including a maple grove. Once at the top, the hiker has a superb panorama of the valley of the Black River. At the end of the route on this trail, the hiker must go around Lake Rémi and pass at the foot of a 150-meter (500-foot) cliff.

== Accommodation ==
The park offers five rustic camping sites near Guy and Rémi lakes. New shelters are under construction.

== Toponym ==
This toponym is linked to the series of seven falls on the course of the Noire River. These falls are distributed over a distance of 17.7 km from the course of the river; however, only the last fall is found in the territory of the Sept-Chutes regional park. This seventh fall popularly called "La Voile de la Mariée" (The Veil of the Bride).
