= Montagne-du-Diable Regional Park =

Protected area in Lanaudière, Quebec, Canada

- Location within Quebec
- Location: Canada, Quebec, Laurentides, Antoine-Labelle Regional County Municipality
- Nearest city: Mont-Laurier
- Coordinates: 46.72225°N 75.55498°W
- Designated: 2012
- Administrator: Parc régional de la Montagne du Diable
- Website: www.parcmontagnedudiable.com

The Montagne-du-Diable Regional Park (in French: Parc régional Montagne du Diable) is a regional park located in the municipality of Ferme-Neuve, in the Antoine-Labelle Regional County Municipality, in administrative region of Laurentides, in Quebec, in Canada.

== History ==
The Mount Sir-Wilfrid was named in 1932 in honor of Sir Wilfrid Laurier (1841-1919) who was the Prime Minister of Canada from 1896 to 1911. The proximity of the mountain to the municipality of Mont-Laurier would have a link in the choice of the toponym of the mountain.

== Main features and activities ==
This park is open year-round. In summer, visitors can go hiking, mountain biking, canoeing/kayaking, paddle boarding, hebertism circuit, outdoor day camp. The winter activities are: snowshoeing, classic skiing, Nordic skiing, skating no skating, ski hok, fatbike, acadéski.

The Village des Bâtisseurs has several infrastructures for recreational tourism activities:

- Eight nature chalets, six of which have a capacity of 6 to 10 people, and two chalets on stilts with a capacity of 4 to 6 people;
- Five unserviced campsites on the shores of "Lac de la Montagne";

The Mount Sir-Wilfrid is covered by three storeys of tree types: the maple-yellow birch grove at the bottom of the mountain; a mixture of white birch and softwood as it approaches 500 meters above sea level; the boreal forest, on top of the mountain.
