= Regional park (Quebec) =

Park in Quebec, Canada

A regional park, in Québec, is an area designated by a regional county municipality (MRC), or equivalent territory, for the dual purposes of recreation and promoting of nature conservation.

While National Parks of Quebec is solely dedicated to the conservation and stewardship of the natural environment, the Regional Parks organisation—despite sharing a potentially ‘earth-friendly’ perspective—allows more for recreational hobbies, sporting and leisurely activities, as well as some commercial property-leasing management and resource development.

== Features ==
In order to establish a regional park, a MRC must adopt a by-law which determines the base of the park. The by-law has no effect on private property, as long as the municipality does not own it. However, the regulation gives them the power to enter-into an agreement with the holder of a property right within the limits of the established park, and to establish a right of preemption, or even a right of supervision over the improvements that an owner brings to his buildings.

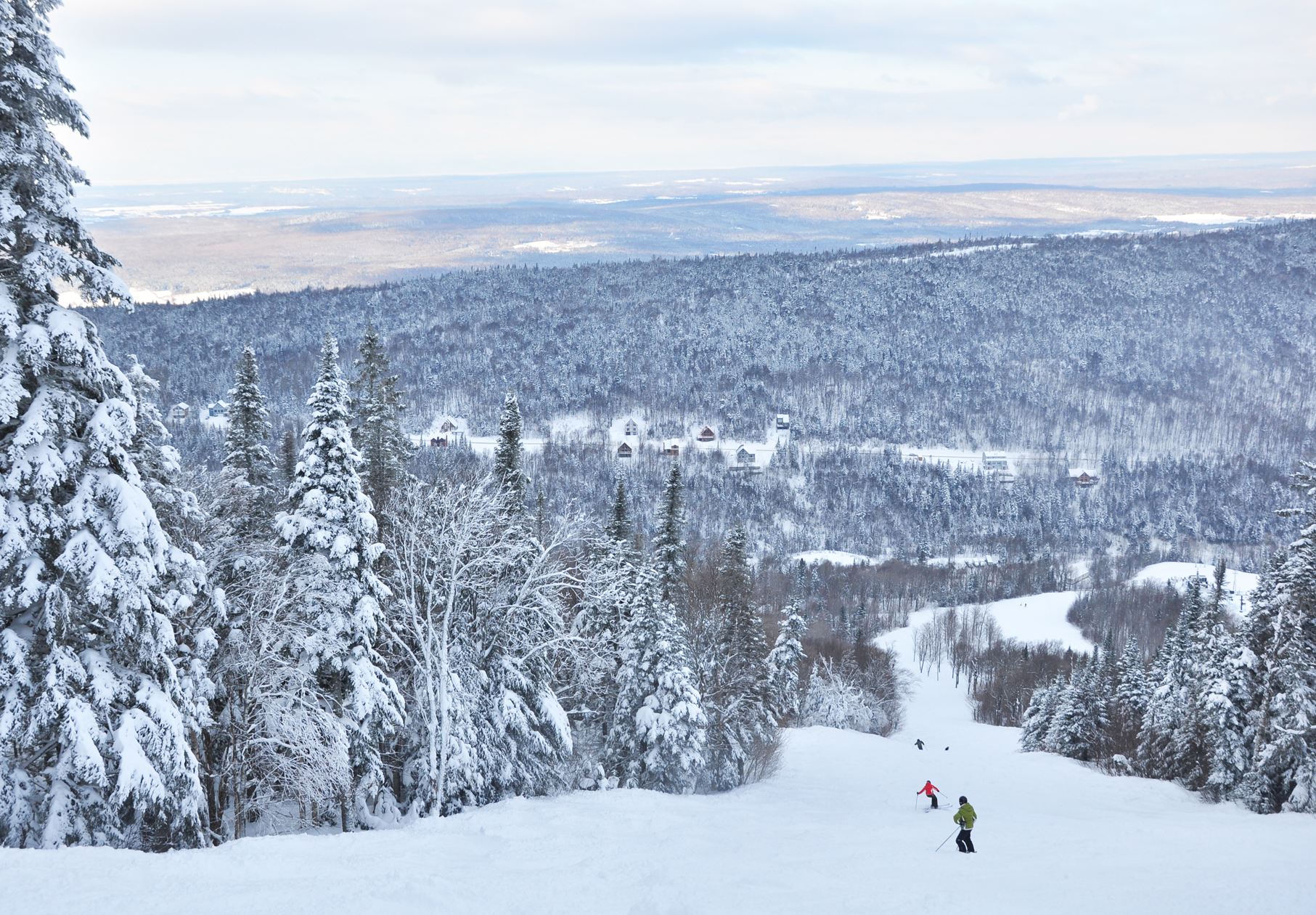
Compared to the designation of a national park of Quebec, the umbrella of ‘regional’ parks allows the practice of extensive recreational activities.

The MRC which has designated a territory as being a regional park may, within its limits, regulate:

- the administration and operation of the park
- protection and nature conservation;
- the security of users;
- the use or the parking of vehicles;
- the possession and care of domestic animals;
- the display;
- the operation of shops;
- the exercise of recreational activities;
- any use of a public road not governed by the Highway Safety Code.

The MRC may operate the commercial, recreational and lodging activities itself within the park boundaries or entrust them to a third party.

=== Designation ===
The legislative framework governing the parks does not provide for a controlled designation. The law provides for a MRC procedure to create a park, but does not govern the use of the designation “regional park”; it is neither compulsory nor regulated. Thus, the Association of regional parks of Quebec claims between 150 and 175 regional parks, while the Ministry of Municipal Affairs recognizes the existence of 17 of these territories.

== List of regional parks ==
Only 17 parks are registered in a land use planning and development plan and recognized by the Ministry of Municipal Affairs:

=== Montréal ===
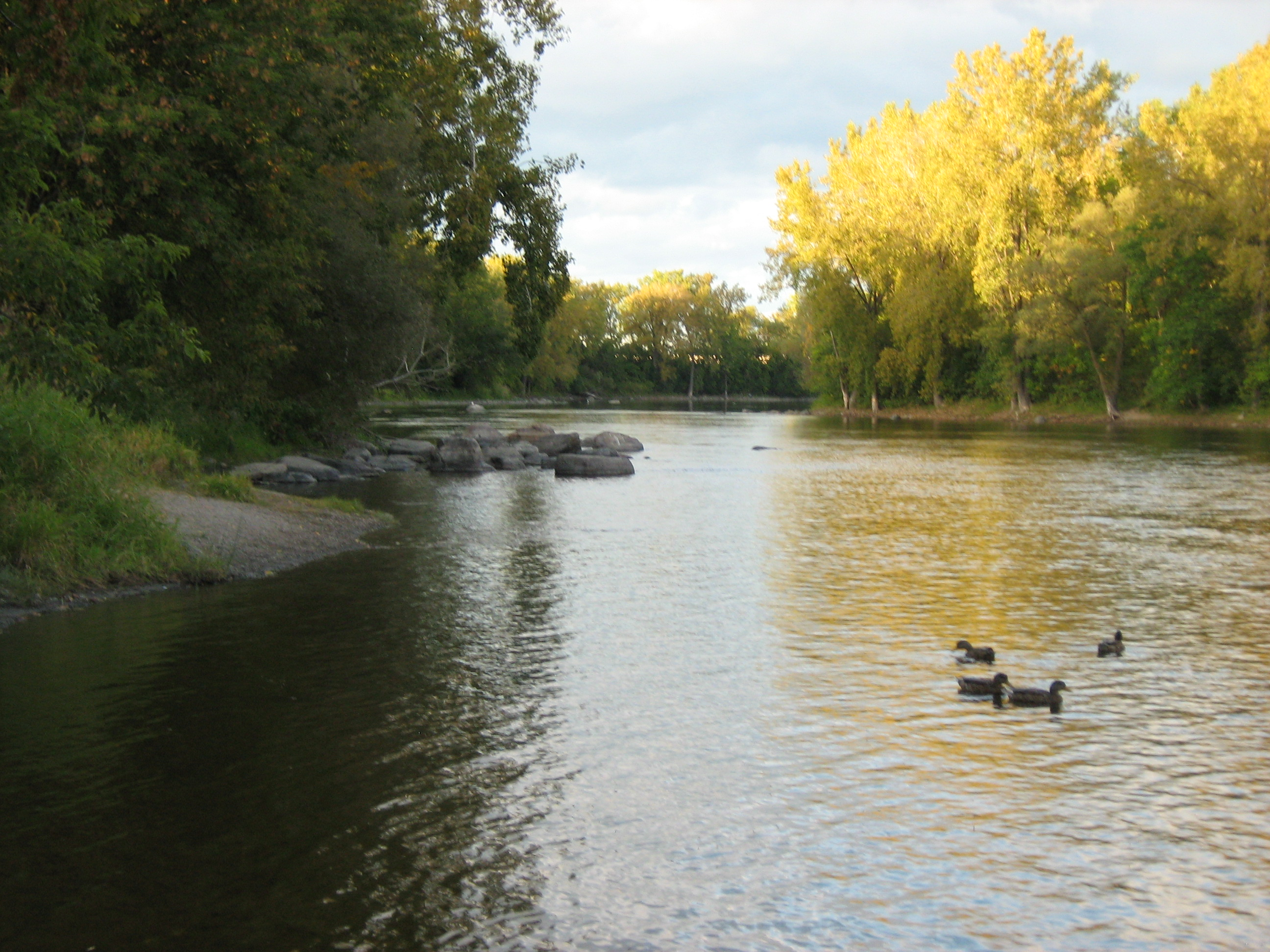
Autumn scene at L'Île-de-la-Visitation Nature Park.

Jurisdiction over intermunicipal parks is vested in the Montreal Urban Community (CUM) since its creation in 1969.

In addition, the CUM declared its exclusive jurisdiction over regional parks on its territory as of 1979. The same year, the metropolitan organization began acquiring green spaces: the Cap Saint-Jacques, the Bois de Liesse and de Saraguay, the Île de la Visitation, and the Pointe aux Trembles. L'Île-de-la-Visitation Nature Park is the first regional park of the CUM to be developed.

=== Montérégie ===
- Beauharnois-Salaberry Regional Park (Beauharnois-Salaberry, Montérégie)
- Des Grèves Regional Park (Marguerite-D'Youville)

=== North ===
- Boréal (Manicouagan, Côte-Nord)
- Cap Jaseux Aventures (Le Fjord-du-Saguenay, Saguenay–Lac-Saint-Jean)
- Obalski Regional Park (Chibougamau, Nord-du-Québec)

=== North-East ===
- Seigneurie-du-lac-Matapédia Regional Park (La Matapédia, Bas-Saint-Laurent)
- Canyon Portes de l'Enfer (TERFA) (Rimouski-Neigette, Bas-Saint-Laurent)
- Mont-Saint-Joseph Regional Park (Avignon, Gaspésie–Îles-de-la-Madeleine)
- Gros Cap Park (Les Îles-de-la-Madeleine)

=== East ===
- Parc de la Gorge (Coaticook)
- Grandes-Coulées Regional Park (L'Érable, Centre-du-Québec)
- Rivière-Gentilly Regional Park (Bécancour, Centre-du-Québec)
- Parc régional du Marécage-des-Scots (Le Haut-Saint-François)
- Parc régional du Mont-Ham (Les Sources, Centre-du-Québec)

=== Quebec Region ===
- Parc régional du Massif-du-Sud (Bellechasse, Les Etchemins)
- Vallée Bras-du-Nord (Portneuf)
- Parc naturel régional de Portneuf (Portneuf)
- Sainte-Anne, Canyon (La Côte-de-Beaupré, Capitale-Nationale)
- Sainte-Foy, Base de Plein Air (Quebec, Capitale-Nationale)
- Parc régional des Appalaches (Montmagny, Chaudière-Appalaches)

=== Central ===
- Centre de la côte Boisée-Groupe Plein Air Terrebonne (Les Moulins, Lanaudière)
- Parc régional de la Chute-à-Bull (Matawinie)
- Lac Taureau (Matawinie)
- Ouareau Forest Regional Park (Matawinie)
- Sept-Chutes (Matawinie, Lanaudière)
- Parc de la Rivière-Batiscan (Les Chenaux, Mauricie)
- Parc de Trois-Sœurs (La Tuque, Mauricie)

=== Laurentides ===
- Rivière-des-Mille-Îles (Thérèse-De Blainville, Laurentides; and Laval)
- Bois de Belle-Rivière; et P'tit Train du Nord (Laurentides)
- Rivière-du-Nord (La Rivière-du-Nord)
- Réservoir Kiamika; Montagne-du-Diable; et Poisson-Blanc (Antoine-Labelle)
- Parc d'Escalage et de Randonnée de la Montagne d'Argent; et Val-David - Val-Morin (Les Laurentides)

== See also ==
- Regional nature parks of France
- Natural Park of Belgium
- National Parks of Quebec
