= Obalski Regional Park =

Protected area in Mauricie, Quebec, Canada

- Parc régional Obalski
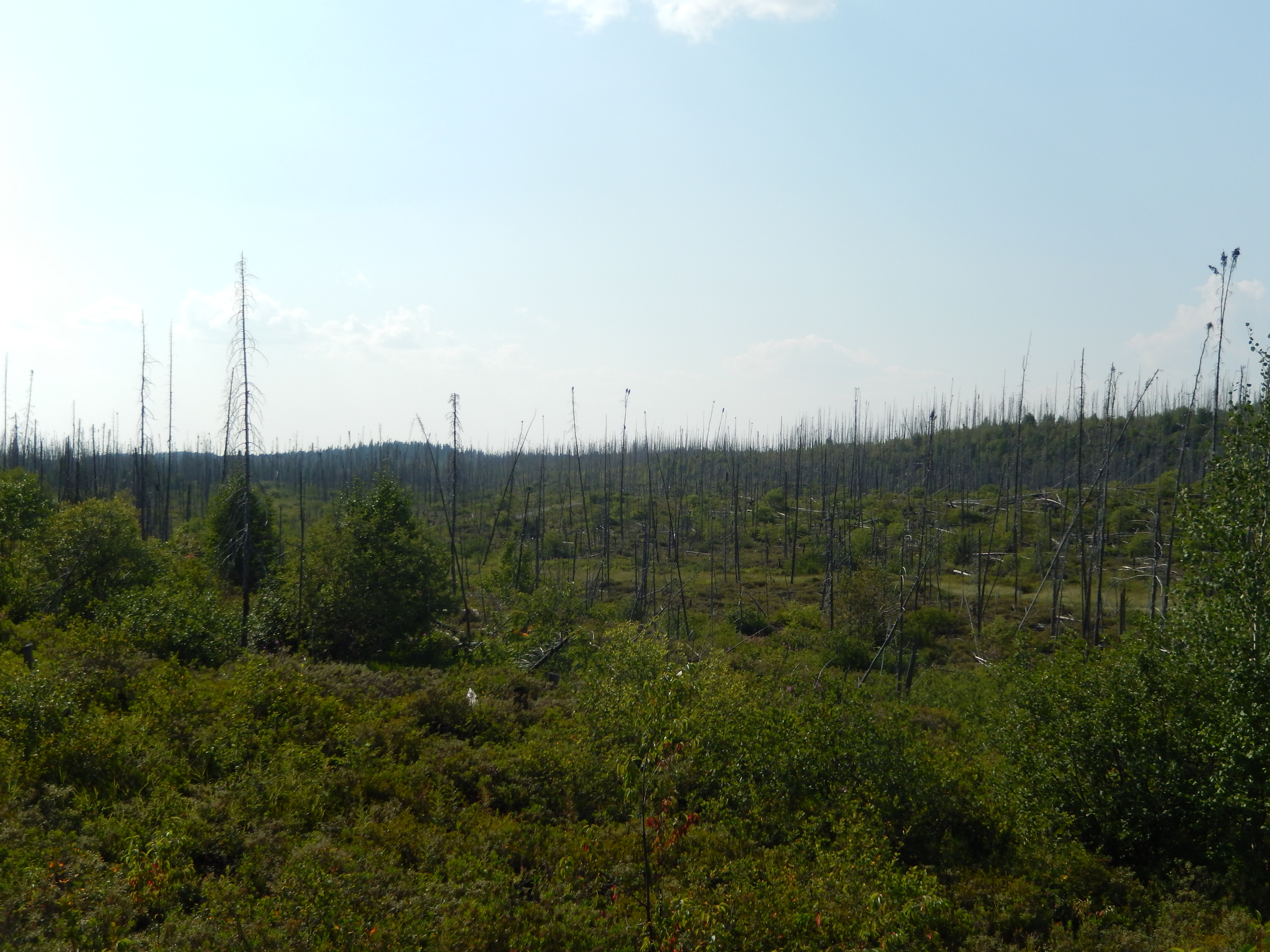
- Obalski Regional Park in August 2014.

- Location within Quebec
- Location: Canada, Quebec, Nord-du-Québec, Chibougamau
- Nearest city: Chibougamau
- Coordinates: 49.9148°N 74.3487°W
- Area: 22 km^{2} (8.5 sq mi)
- Operator: Ville de Chibougamau

The Obalski Regional Park (in French: Parc régional Obalski) is a regional park located in the municipality of Chibougamau, in the Regional County Municipality (MRC) of Jamésie, in administrative region of Nord-du-Québec, in Quebec, in Canada.

The mission of this regional park is to provide itself with numerous facilities, to promote outdoor recreational activities in a natural environment, to favor the conservation of the forest environment and the preservation of wildlife.

== Geography ==
This park is located east of the city of Chibougamau and east of route 167.

== Activities ==
This park is open year-round. Access to the park is free. In summer, most of the activities in the park are free. In winter, some charges may apply for services provided. This park occupies an area of 22 square kilometres (8.5 sq mi). It is divided into two distinct areas. The first part has developed trails. The other part is located further south east is more rustic and wild. This park has two shelters, two beaches, a point of observation of the region, an audio interpretation circuit by canoe entitled "La nature nous parle!" (Nature speaks to us!).

Visitors to the park can practice canoeing, kayaking, pedal boating and fishing (or ice fishing in winter). They can also go on hikes to interpret nature and the environment, observe flora and fauna, use the municipal beach (lake Gilman) with supervision. Cycling enthusiasts can ride 26.4 km; mountain biking, 24.6 km; and snow biking/fatbiking in winter. Snowshoeing can be practiced over 23.3 km and cross-country skying. The picnic area and municipal beach of lake Gilman are popular. The park has several nature interpretation panels.

The accesses to the park's trails are located near the municipal beach (49.9099°N 74.3571°W) of Chibougamau. Two other accesses are possible; one is located at the Mont-Chalco Outdoor Center (49.9148°N 74.3487°W), at km 238 of route 167, and the other one, at km 234 of Route 167, in front of the Chibougamau hospital (49.9150°N 74.3053°W). The paths of the park are under wooded cover in boreal forest.

- Kiwanis trail: starting from the town of Chibougamau, the Kiwanis trail circles Gilman lakes. This trail has a shortcut via the Hydro trail, partially skirting each of the lakes.
- Rustic Trail: this trail is taken via the Kiwanis Trail; the two trails join at the western end of Petit lac Gilman. Hikers can climb to the top of Mount Helios. This mount was named in honor of the Greek sun god. At the top, the view is magnificent over the city of Chibougamau, Chibougamau Lake and Dorés Lake.
- Lake Sauvage trail: this trail passes through the lake of the same name and ends at Chemin Campbell.
- Another trail leads to the top of Mount Chalco.

== History ==
This site was first used by the Crees. This area is still a trapping territory for the Cree community of Oujé-Bougoumou. In 2005, a forest fire ravaged the park.

== Flora and fauna ==
In the park, the visitors might see snowshoe hare, spruce grouse, ruffed grouse and red fox. Occasionally, it is possible to see the Canada lynx here and the rarer black bear.

== Toponymy ==
The toponym "Obalski regional park" evokes the memory of Joseph Obalski (1852-1915), a mining engineer who had the merit of having confirmed the presence of significant copper deposits in the region.
