= Grandes-Coulées Regional Park =

Protected area in Centre-du-Québec, Quebec, Canada

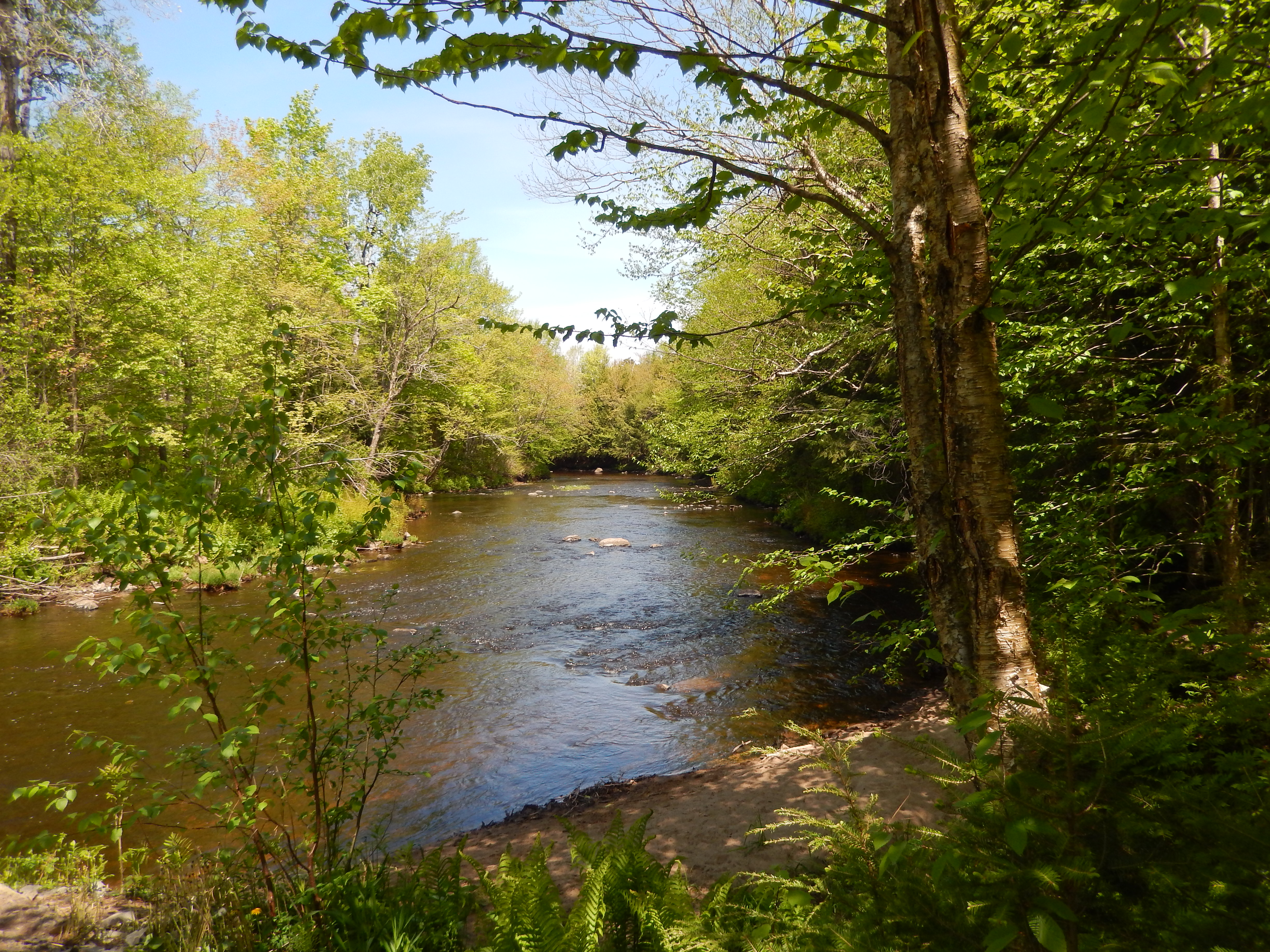
- The Noire River in the Grandes-Coulées Regional Park.

- Location within Quebec
- Location: Canada, Quebec, Centre-du-Québec, L'Érable Regional County Municipality
- Nearest city: Notre-Dame-de-Lourdes, Plessisville et Villeroy
- Coordinates: 46.371716°N 71.825231°W
- Area: 15.8 ha (39 acres)
- Created: 2011
- Visitors: 10,000
- Administrator: Parc régional des Grandes-Coulées
- Website: www.parcdesgrandescoulees.com

The regional park of Grandes-Coulées (in French: Parc régional des Grandes-Coulées) is a regional park of Quebec inaugurated in 2011 and located in the municipalities of Notre-Dame-de-Lourdes, Plessisville and Villeroy, in L'Érable Regional County Municipality, in the administrative region of Centre-du-Québec, in Quebec, Canada.

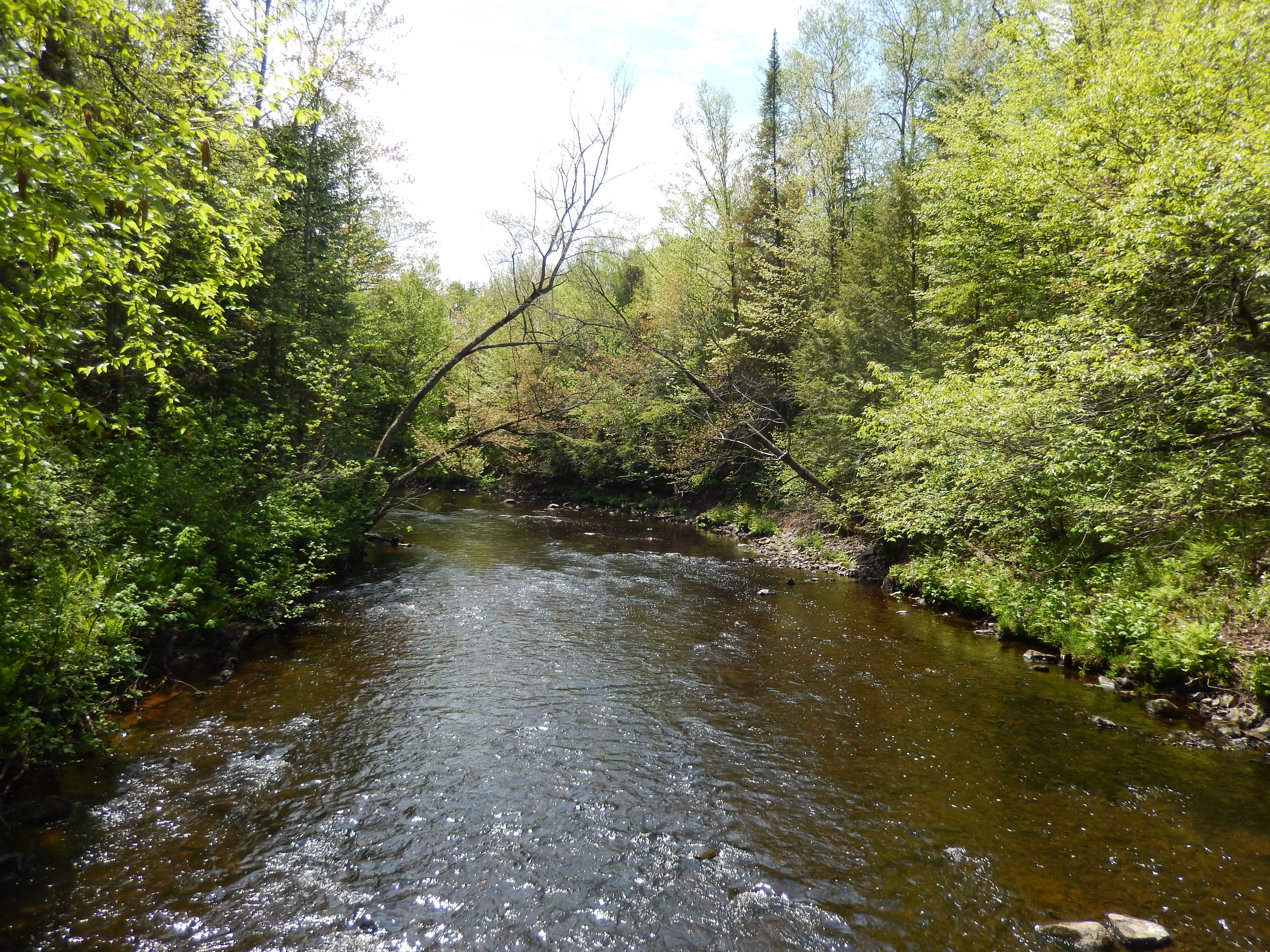
Another view of the Rivière Noire in the park.

The park's raison d'être is to position itself as a place for the practice of outdoor recreational activities and to make its territory accessible and attractive to the population of the L’Érable MRC, but also to visitors.

== Administration ==
The park is divided into five parts, including two protected areas, the Old Forest and the Great Bog. La Forêt Sauvage and la Plaine are located in Villeroy and are used for nature observation and for snowmobile. The total area occupied by the two main sectors, which are not connected, totals 30.97 square kilometres (11.96 sq mi), of which 20.67 square kilometres (7.98 sq mi) is occupied by peat bog and the rest by forest. The fifth part of the park is the Plessisville tourist office, the Carrefour de l'Érable, which has also served as an information center for the latter since 2012.

== Installations ==
You can find several trails in each sector, the most comprising 10 km of trails and the second comprising 3 km, including 1.2 km of wooden paving. There are also accommodation facilities, such as shelters, and sanitation facilities. Structures of hebertism have also been established there, such as sets of ropes, in addition to a food court. Several information panels on the park are present.

== History ==
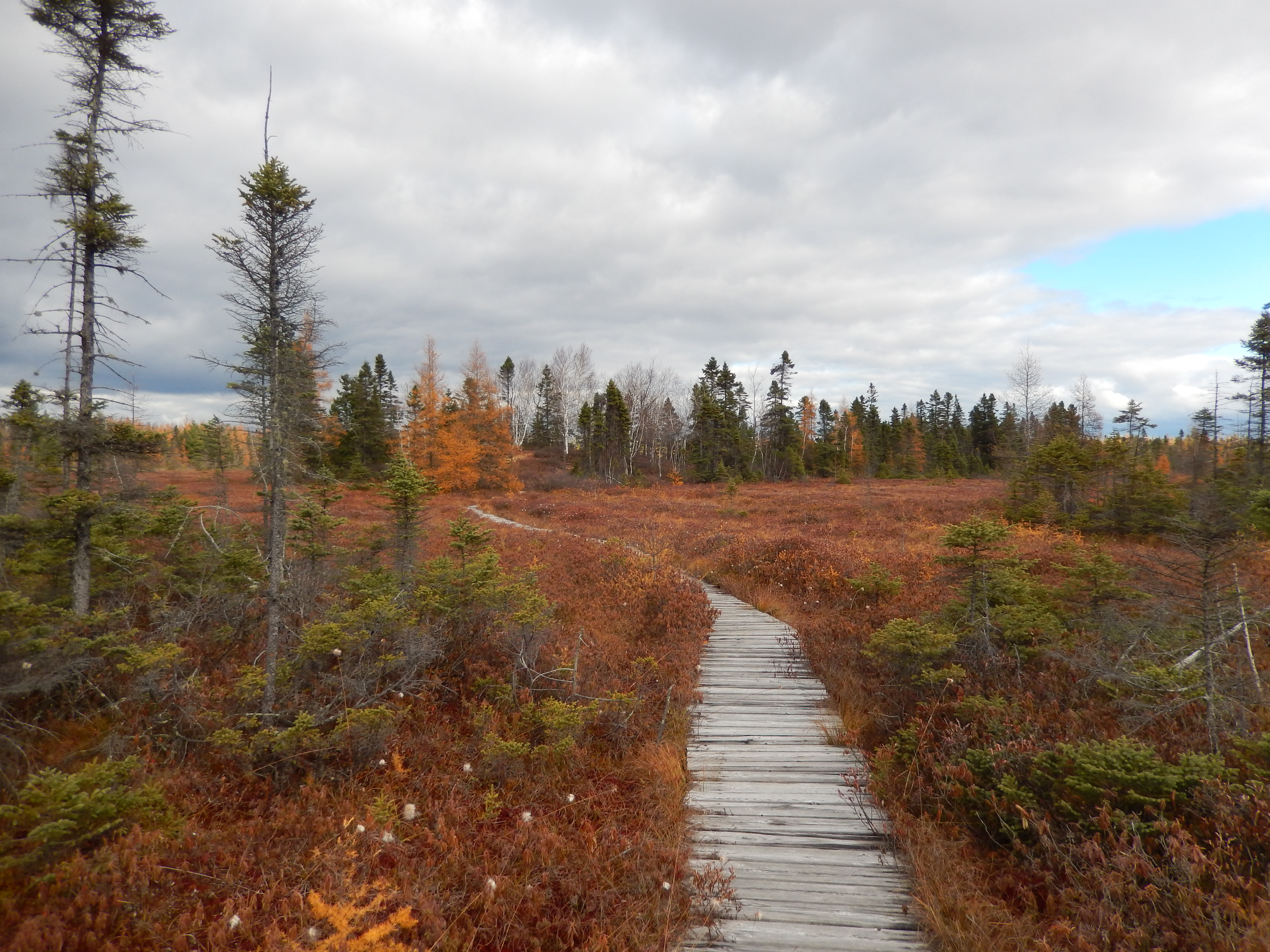
The Grande tourbière sector, in Villeroy.

Following a request from the regional county municipality (MRC), in 2010, the Grandes-Coulées regional park was officially recognized by the Ministry of Municipal Affairs and Housing (MAMH). The park was inaugurated in November 2011 by the L'Érable Regional County Municipality (MRC) in order to develop tourism in its region. The project initially constituted a grouping of five different poles of activity located in Villeroy and Plessisville, passing through a few other villages. These are the Old forest, the Great peat bog, the Forêt sauvage, the Plaine and the Carrefour de l'Érable. In 2018, the coordinator of the MRC de l'Érable, Steve Garneau, let it be known that he wanted to invest 200,000 $CAD over the next few years on the redevelopment of the park.

=== Fauna ===
The Grande peatland sector is home to several animal species such as the Upland Sandpiper and several types of butterflies such as the willow (trad. thule). Species potentially present include the Sandhill Crane and Short-eared Owl.

== Sports activities ==
Sporting activities that are practicable and permitted there include fishing, canicross, cani-VTT, hiking in snowshoes, hiking, running and cycling. Sports equipment is also available for hire. In winter, the park is also used for snowmobiling.

== Attendance ==
The park is open from sunrise to sunset. The old-growth forest sector is open year-round, while that of the Great peat bog opens from May 1 to October 30. Entrance is free.

== See also ==
- Regional Park (Quebec)
