= Belle River =

Belle River may refer to:

== Canada ==
- Belle River, Ontario, a community in Lakeshore, Ontario

== France ==
- Belle River, Saint Pierre and Miquelon

== United States ==
- Belle River, Louisiana
  - Belle River (Louisiana), a river of Louisiana
- Belle River, Michigan, an unincorporated community in St. Clair County
- Belle River (Michigan), a tributary of the St. Clair River
- Belle River Township, Douglas County, Minnesota

== See also ==
- Bell River (disambiguation)
- Belle-Rivière (disambiguation)
