= Bras-du-Nord Valley =

Recreative park in Capitale-Nationale, Quebec, Canada

- Location within Quebec
- Location: Canada, Quebec, Capitale-Nationale, Portneuf Regional County Municipality
- Nearest city: Saint-Raymond
- Coordinates: 46.90003°N 71.81470°W
- Administrator: Coop de solidarité de la Vallée Bras-du-Nord
- Website: Site officiel de la Vallée Bras-du-Nord

The Vallée Bras-du-Nord is an outdoor center in nature, located in the territory of the municipality of Saint-Raymond, in the regional county municipality of Portneuf Regional County Municipality, in the administrative region of Capitale-Nationale, in Quebec, Canada.

This park has five reception stations: Shannahan, Perthuis, Mauvais, Cantin and the main reception (Saint-Raymond sector) whose address is at 107 Grande Ligne, Saint-Raymond, QC, G3L 2Y4.

== Main activities ==
This outdoor destination in Quebec offers 80 kilometres (50 mi) of hiking and snowshoeing trails and 100 kilometres (62 mi) of singletrack-type mountain biking trails. The park also offers canyoning, via ferrata, fat bike and mountain skiing activities. In terms of nautical activities, this center offers 17.5 km of river descent in calm water.

== See also ==
=== Related Articles ===
- Regional Park (Quebec)
- Bras du Nord, a stream
