= Noire River (L'Assomption River tributary) =

River in Lanaudière, Quebec, Canada

- Location within Quebec
- Native name: Rivière Noire (French)

Location
- Country: Canada
- Provinces: Quebec
- Region: Lanaudière
- MRC: Matawinie Regional County Municipality

Physical characteristics
- Mouth: L'Assomption River
  - coordinates: 46°12′22″N 73°33′40″W

The Noire River (in French: rivière Noire) is a watercourse running through the municipalities of Saint-Zénon, Sainte-Émélie-de-l'Énergie and Saint-Jean-de-Matha, in the Matawinie Regional County Municipality (MRC), in the administrative region of Lanaudière, in Quebec, in Canada.

== Toponymy ==
The toponym Rivière Noire was made official on 5 December 1968 at the Place Names Bank of the Commission de toponymie du Québec.

== See also ==
- Sept-Chutes Regional Park
- List of rivers of Quebec
