= Marécage-des-Scots Regional Park =

Protected area in Centre-du-Québec, Quebec, Canada

- Location within Quebec
- Location: Canada, Quebec, Estrie, Le Haut-Saint-François Regional County Municipality
- Nearest city: Drummondville
- Coordinates: 45.51194°N 71.22594°W
- Operator: Centre local de développement (CLD) du Haut-Saint-François

The Marécage-des-Scots Regional Park (in French: Parc régional du Marécage-des-Scots) is a regional park of Quebec inaugurated in ? and straddling the municipalities of Hampden and Scotstown, in Le Haut-Saint-François Regional County Municipality, in the administrative region of Estrie, in Quebec, Canada.

The regional park is located northwest of Mont-Mégantic National Park. It has multi-use trails connecting the national park to the town of Scotstown.

== Administration ==
Le Haut-Saint-François Regional County Municipality has entrusted the management of the Marécage-des-Scots Regional Park to the Haut-Saint-François Local Development Center (CLD).

== Installations ==
The Marécage-des-Scots is a special ecosystem. Several stops have been set up, both along the Saumon River and McLeod Creek. These stops feature interpretive panels of fauna, flora, forestry and the history of the legendary Log hauler train. Children can enter a replica of the train. The section inside the MMFN is picturesque. This sector offers hiking trails on the Franceville ridge or on the brand new escarpments trail.

== Activities ==
Usually the park is closed during the hunting season until mid-December. Then, access is authorized in winter for the practice of snowshoeing (and cross-country skiing) until the spring thaw.

Park users can cycle and hike there for a total of 25 kilometres (16 mi). The park offers a 8.3 kilometres (5.2 mi) multi-purpose gravelly and winding trail (one way, or 16.6 kilometres (10.3 mi)) in forest area. Users also have access to an extension of another 4.5 kilometres (2.8 mi) (one way) thanks to a trail within the Franceville sector of the Mont-Mégantic National Park (PNMM) (Vallée trail). Note: Access fees for the inside MMFN section apply. These trails lead to the Beaver Stopover. A hybrid or mountain bike is recommended.

The park has three parking spaces: either at Walter-Mackenzie Park in Scotstown, at the gazebo at the outlet of McLeod Creek or opposite the Franceville entrance of the MMNP. To reach the two parking lots located on Franceville Road, just continue for 4 kilometres (2.5 mi) past the village of Scotstown. Coming from Sherbrooke, by route 108 or 112 East, take route 214 to Scotstown.

The park also has a children's play area and picnic area.

== Toponymy ==
This park includes the Marécage-des-Scots, hence the origin of the toponym "Marécage-des-Scots Regional Park". Ce toponyme a été officialisé le 27 novembre 2015 à la Banque de noms de lieux de la Commission de toponymie du Québec.
