= Paleo-Bell River =

River in Canada

The Paleo-Bell River is a hypothesized west-to-east flowing ancient river system in North America. The river may have drained an area larger than the current day Amazon River from the Eocene (50 million years ago) to the Pliocene (3 million years ago) with the direction of drainage caused by the uplift of the Rocky Mountains. It is named after Canadian geologist Robert Bell who first proposed the concept in 1895.

== Development of the Paleo-Bell River theory ==
In the late 1800s, Canadian geologist Robert Bell analyzed the flow of glacial ice during the Pleistocene working for the Geological Survey of Canada and from 1884 to 1885 explored the oceanography of Hudson Bay and Hudson Strait. During a meeting of the Royal Society of Canada in 1895, he proposed that before the Pleistocene glaciations a very large river drained portions of North America through the Hudson Strait.

A few years later A.W.G. Wilson at McGill University supported Bell's claims, finding that the Canadian Shield beneath Hudson Bay eroded almost flat and then uplifted and warped in the recent geological past.

== Evidence for the Paleo-Bell River ==
In the early 1970s, N.J. McMillan, a geologist with Aquitaine Petroleum, assessed the sediments in the Saglek Basin beneath the Hudson Strait. The sediment was deposited between 55 and five million years ago, but totaled to 2.5 million cubic kilometers, which was more than erosion from the uplands of Labrador and Baffin Island could explain.

During the 1980s, University of British Columbia researcher V. Eileen Williams found fossilized pollen grains in the sediments, some dating back to the Mesozoic. Based on similar palynomorphs eroded out of sedimentary rocks and moved thousands of kilometers by the Orinoco River and Mississippi River, forming an additional piece of evidence in favor of the hypothesis. In the early 1990s, Alejandra Duk-Rodkin interpreted eastward-dipping erosional surfaces crossing the Mackenzie River as indications of the eastward flow of the river.

In a 2013 paper, James Sears from the University of Montana reanalyzed fossil pollen and identified an assemblages similar to those found in the Chinle Formation and Supai Group in the Grand Canyon, suggesting a connection to that region.

== End of the river system ==
The flow of water from the Grand Canyon region may have stopped around 16 million years ago due to eruptions of the Yellowstone hot spot. Isostatic depression of the crust by ice sheets during the Pleistocene deprived the Saglek Basin of sediment as rivers drained directly into the newly formed Hudson Bay. Much of the river's flow was taken up by the Mackenzie River Basin, leaving the Saskatchewan River and Nelson River as the last remnants of the system.
