= Grande Coulée Mountain =

Mountain in RCM Montmagny in Quebec (Canada)

Highest point
- Peak: 853 metres (2,799 ft)
- Coordinates: 46°40′39″N 70°21′10″W

Geography
- Country: Canada
- Province: Quebec
- Administrative: Chaudière-Appalaches
- MRC: Montmagny Regional County Municipality
- Parent range: Notre Dame Mountains
- Topo map: Quebec

The montagne Grande Coulée (in English: Grande Coulée Mountain) is a mountain located at Saint-Paul-de-Montminy, in the Montmagny Regional County Municipality, in the administrative region Chaudière-Appalaches, Quebec, in Canada.

This mountain housed the Grande Coulée ski resort, an alpine ski center which was closed in 1999, and is now part of Appalachian Regional Park. It rises to 853 meters above sea level.
