= Bois de Belle-Rivière Regional Park =

Protected area in Laurentides, Quebec, Canada

- Location within Quebec
- Location: Canada, Quebec, Laurentides, Mirabel Regional County Municipality
- Nearest city: Mirabel
- Coordinates: 45.62528°N 74.07583°W
- Area: 176 ha (430 acres)
- Website: Site officiel du parc régional du Bois de Belle-Rivière

The Bois de Belle-Rivière Regional Park (also referred to as: Bois-de-Belle-Rivière Regional Educational Park) is a regional park located in the city of Mirabel, in the administrative region of Basses-Laurentides, in Quebec, Canada.

This regional park is open year round.

== Geography ==
This park has an area of 176 hectares (430 acres).

== Main activities ==
This regional park offers a network of hiking trails, which cross the two gardens and a wild forest. The park's website indicates that dogs can accompany their handler. The Art 3 artistic trail allows you to admire several works of art (by artists from the region and elsewhere) whose design is in harmony with nature. The park also has many picnic areas.

The park also offers treasure hunting and GPS rally activities. The objective of the activity is to discover clues while walking the trails. Users can also practice Disc Golf which is practiced according to the same basic rules of golf; however the ball and the sticks are replaced by the use of a "frisbee"; and a basket replaces the hole.

The park has a swimming infrastructure that includes several bodies of water (including the Naya basin), two water games and a paddling pool. Visitors can also fish for rainbow trout in a few ponds.

In winter, users can skate freely on a 2.5 kilometres (1.6 mi) ice trail in the forest. The park also offers 7 kilometres (4.3 mi) of beginner level ski touring or off piste snowshoeing activity. The sliding slope on tubes has a height of 20 metres (66 ft). The park organizes evenings illuminated with soft multicolored lights.

The park has an astronomical observatory. The observatory site is located in a region rated 5 on the Bortle scale (i.e. the brightness scale of the night sky). This situation favors the observation of the sky because the site is surrounded by agricultural land. This observatory is built on a collie 23 meters high, allowing to obtain a clear view on 360 degrees.

The Mirabel ornithology club offers several activities to the general public in the Bois de Belle-Rivière. This forest has several species of birds. The park also offers a 50,000 square foot dog park.

The park offers a rental service for five shelters for family accommodation (4 to 15 people). The park also offers a rental center for activities practiced in the park and events.

== Toponymy ==
The toponym "Bois de Belle-Rivière" was made official on December 17, 1987 at the Commission de toponymie du Québec. However, the toponym "Parc régional du Bois de Belle-Rivière" does not appear in this toponymic register.
