= Poisson-Blanc Lake =

Lac in Laurentides, Quebec, Canada

- Lac du Poisson Blanc (French)
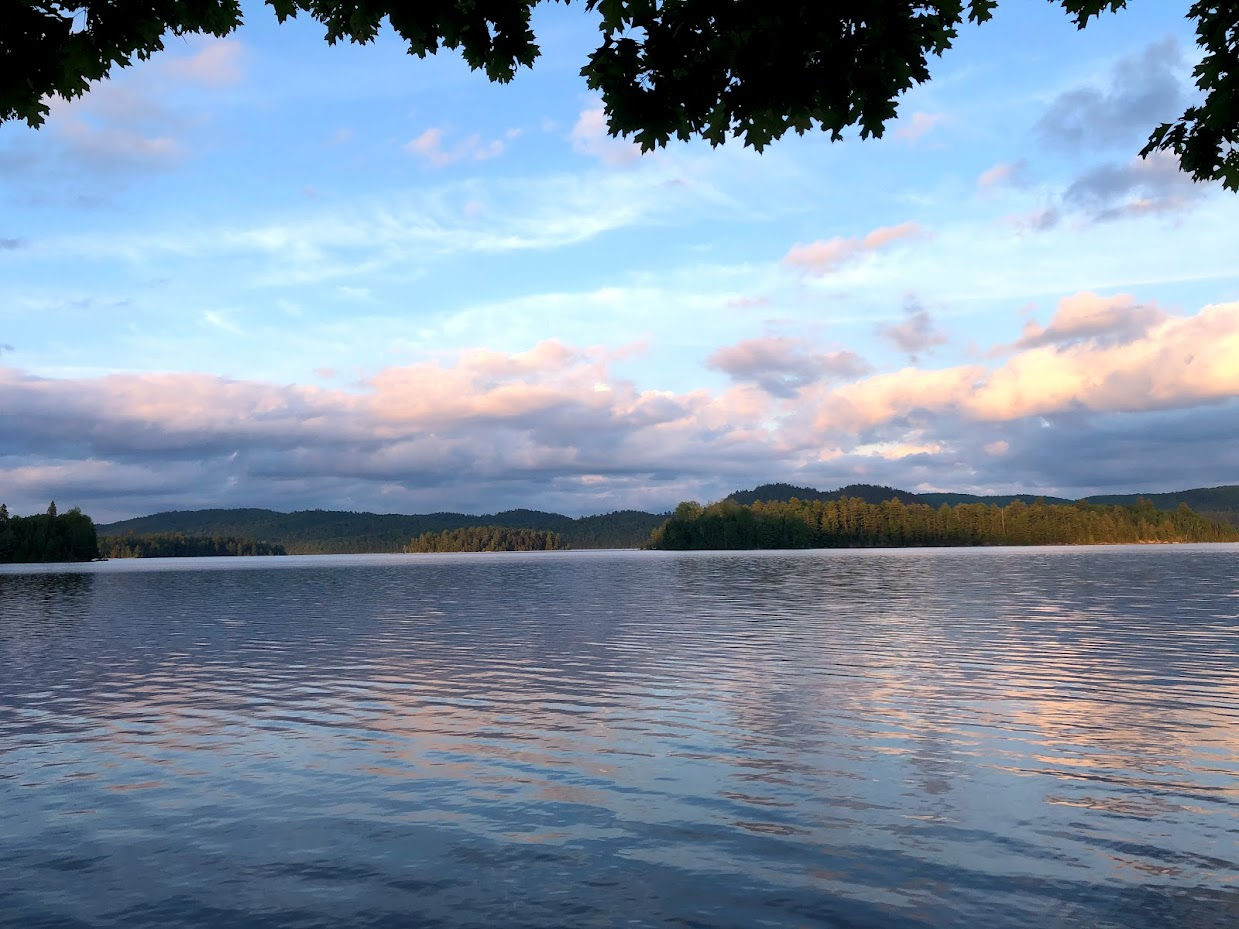

- Location within Quebec
- Location: Notre-Dame-du-Laus, Laurentides, Quebec, Canada
- Coordinates: 46.01389°N 75.70889°W
- Type: Reservoir
- Part of: Poisson-Blanc Reservoir
- Primary inflows: Rivière du Lièvre
- Primary outflows: Rivière du Lièvre
- Max. length: 25 kilometres (16 mi)
- Max. width: 4 kilometres (2.5 mi)

The Lac du Poisson Blanc (in English: Poisson-Blanc Lake) is a freshwater body of the municipality of Notre-Dame-du-Laus, in the Antoine-Labelle Regional County Municipality (MRC), in the administrative region of Laurentides, in Quebec, in Canada.

== Geography ==
Lac du Poisson-Blanc is located 7.4 km (4.6 mi) east of Lac Sainte-Marie which is a widening of the Gatineau River. The "Sables reservoir" is juxtaposed to the north of Lac du Poisson-Blanc. Lac du Poisson-Blanc is a tributary of the Lièvre River which is a tributary of the Ottawa River.

Covering an area of 85 km^{2} (33 sq mi), Lac du Poisson-Blanc is a freshwater reservoir that extends into the townships of Blake, Bigelow, Bowman and Hincks.

In 1928, a dam was erected on the Lièvre River created this reservoir, 25 km (16 mi) long and 4 km (2.5 mi) wide, thus enlarging the original Poisson-Blanc lake.

== Toponymy ==
The toponym "Lac du Poisson-Blanc" was formalized in 1931 to designate this reservoir, using the name of the original lake. The name of the lake was mentioned in 1914 by Eugène Rouillard. The name of the lake refers to the white fish that are abundant in its waters. The general name "Poisson Blanc" (White fish) refers to freshwater fish with pale, soft and rather bland flesh. For example, lake whitefish (Coregonus clupeaformis) which is a cold freshwater salmonid, is also commonly referred to as "white fish".

In 1914, on page 339 of his "Dictionary of rivers and lakes of the Province of Quebec", the explorer Rouillard relates that "In one of the bays of this lake is a remarkable cave called" The grotto of the Church". Its depth is estimated at 500 feet (150 m), while at a distance of 40 feet (12 m) from the entrance, it measures 20 feet (6.1 m) in height and width".

The toponym "lac du Poisson-Blanc" was made official on 5 December 1968 at the Place Names Bank of the Commission de toponymie du Québec.

== See also ==
- List of lakes of Canada
