= Domaine et manoir de Belle-Rivière =

Manoir in Laurentides, Quebec, Canada

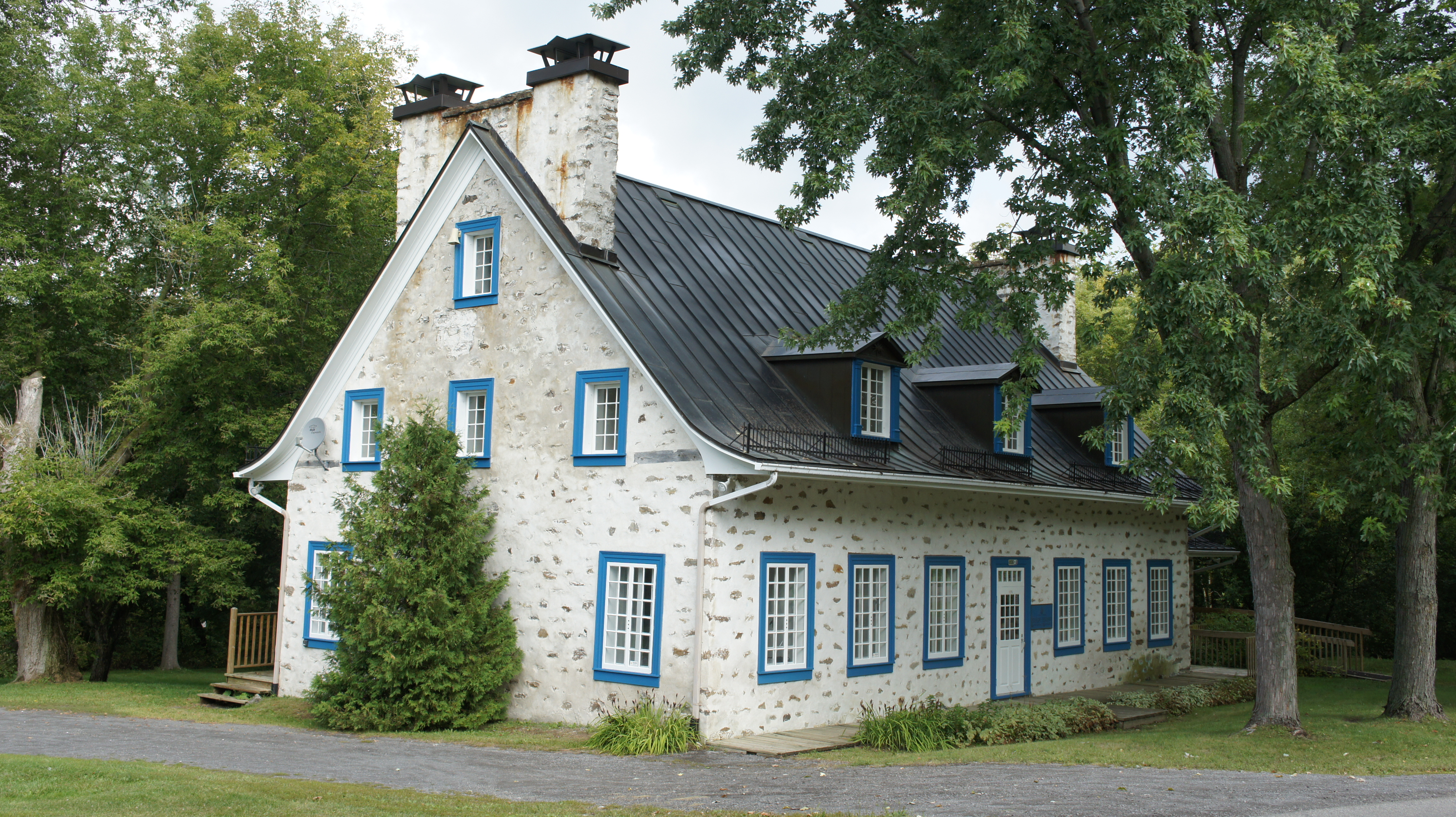
- Manoir de Belle-Rivière
- 45.62222°N 74.09695°W
- Location: Canada, Québec, Laurentides, Mirabel
- Type: Patrimonial estate
- Material: Stones
- Beginning date: 1804
- Website: Domaine et manoir de Belle-Rivière

The Domaine et manoir de Belle-Rivière (in English: estate and manor) is a heritage building built in 1804, located in the Sainte-Scholastique sector, of the city of Mirabel, in the administrative region of Laurentides, in Quebec, in Canada.

This seigneurial estate is located at 8106 rue de Belle-Rivière, in Mirabel. This heritage building is now the property of the cégep de Saint-Jérôme, where its environmental training centre is located.

== History ==
A mill was erected in 1804 in Belle-Rivière at the same time as the erection of the manor by the Sulpicians. The latter served as the miller's residence. The Sulpicians resided there during the annual harvests. The Sulpicians left the estate in 1911.

Between 1830 and 1850, the mansion would have undergone transformations.

== Toponymy ==
This seigneurial estate was classified as a heritage building on July 9, 1963. The toponym "Domaine et manoir de Belle-Rivière" was formalized on May 7, 2003 at the Commission de toponymie du Québec.

== See also ==
- Lordship of Lac-des-Deux-Montagnes
- Cégep de Saint-Jérôme (Environmental training center)
