= Contrecoeur =

Contrecœur
- City
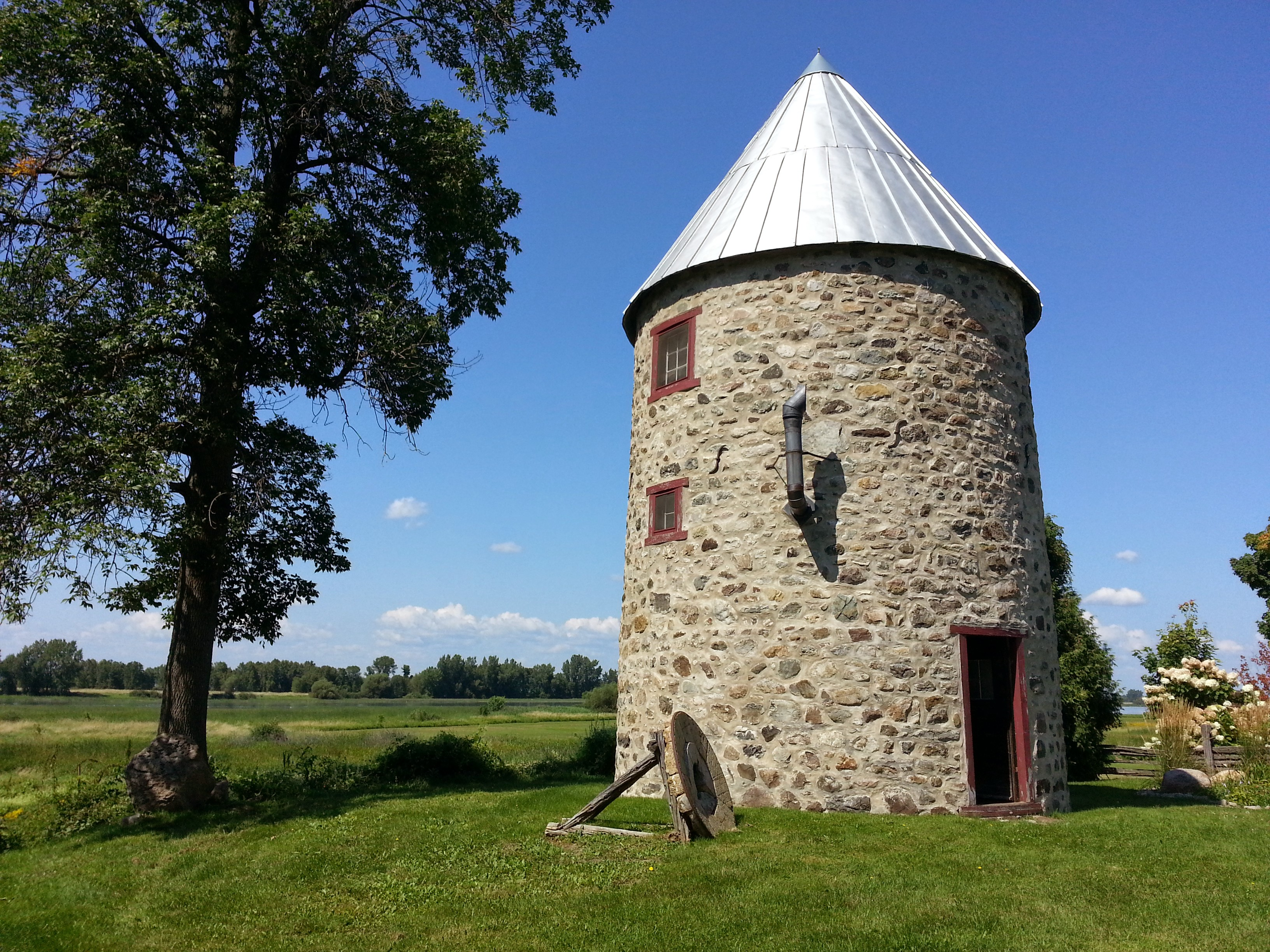
- Contrecoeur windmill known as "Moulin Chaput", built in 1742

- Coat of arms
- Motto: À cœur vaillant tout est possible
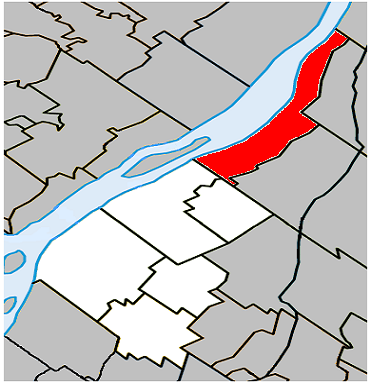
- Location within Marguerite-D'Youville RCM.

- Location in southern Quebec.
- Coordinates: 45°51′N 73°14′W
- Country: Canada
- Province: Quebec
- Region: Montérégie
- RCM: Marguerite-D'Youville
- Settled: 1681
- Constituted: January 1, 1976

Government
  - Mayor: Maud Allaire
  - Federal riding: Pierre-Boucher—Les Patriotes—Verchères
  - Prov. riding: Richelieu

Area
  - Total: 87.60 km^{2} (33.82 sq mi)
  - Land: 62.20 km^{2} (24.02 sq mi)

Population (2021)
  - Total: 9,480
  - Density: 152.4/km^{2} (395/sq mi)
  - Pop 2016-2021: ▲20.2%
  - Dwellings: 4,252
- Time zone: UTC−5 (EST)
  - Summer (DST): UTC−4 (EDT)
- Postal code(s): J0L
- Area codes: 450 and 579
- Highways A-30: R-132; R-137
- Website: www.ville.contrecoeur.qc.ca

Contrecœur (French pronunciation: [kɔ̃tʁəkœʁ]) is a city in southwestern Quebec, Canada on the south shore of the St. Lawrence River. The population as of the Canada 2021 Census was 9,480. Contrecœur is approximately 45 kilometres (28 mi) northeast of Montreal and is accessible via Autoroute 30, the main road from the southwest, which continues on to Sorel-Tracy.

== History ==
Plaque honouring pioneers of the town of Contrecœur

In 1672, Antoine Pécaudy de Contrecœur, a soldier of the Carignan-Salières Regiment, originally from Saint-Chef, Isère, France, was granted a seigneury by King Louis XIV. He and 68 other pioneers founded the town in 1681, and it is named in his honour. A migratory bird sanctuary is located near the town on Contrecœur Island. Contrecœur is currently twinned with Saint-Chef, in southeast France, and has been since 1993.

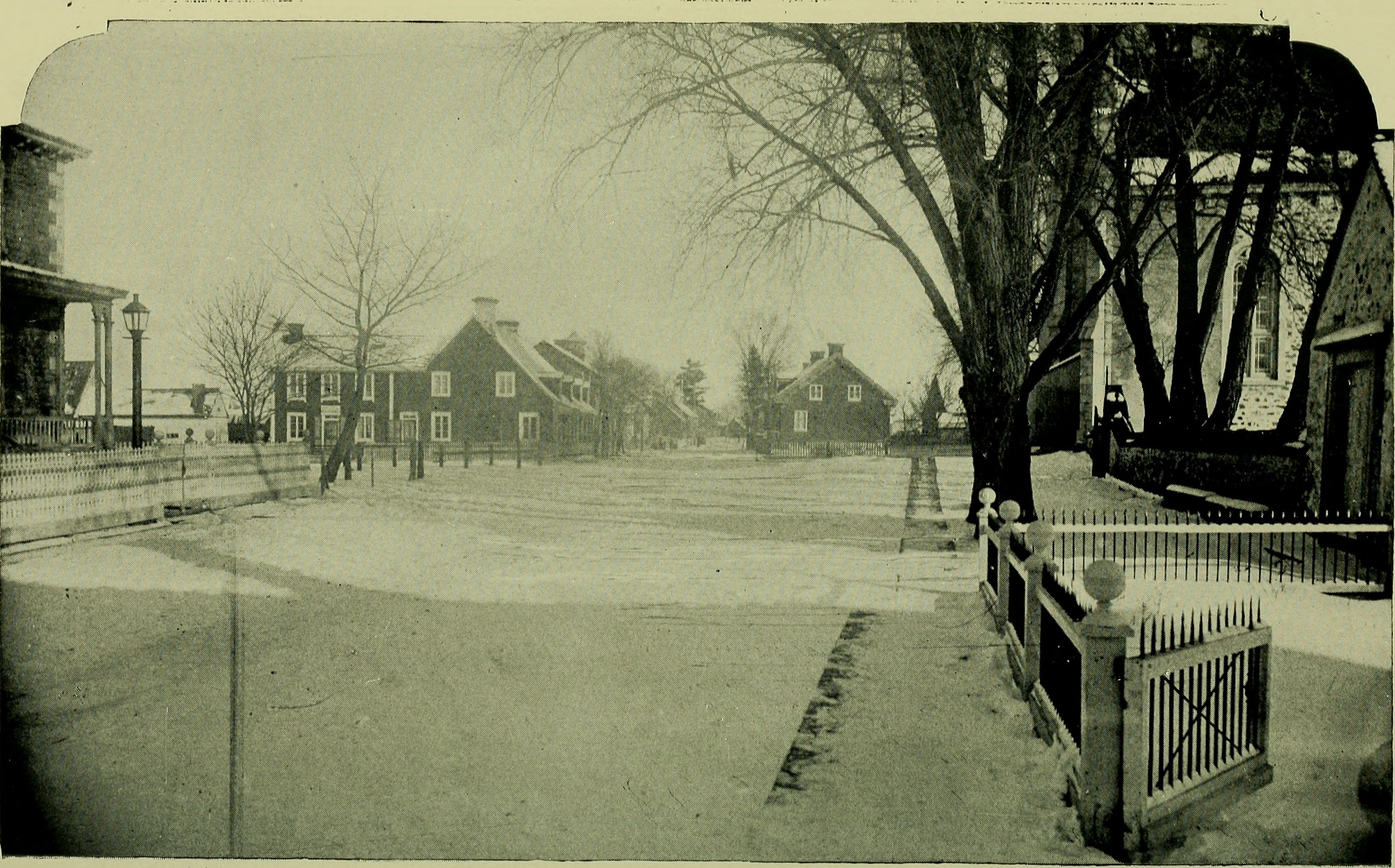
Contrecœur in the early 20th century

The steel mill in Contrecoeur-West was in 1994 privatised by the Quebec government. The initial owner of Norambar was Stelco, until Mittal purchased it in 2004. The steel mill in Contrecoeur-Est, Sidbec-Dosco, was privatised in 1994 into Ispat International. Mittal purchased that too, and merged with Arcelor to form ArcelorMittal in 2006. The Contrecoeur-West and Contrecoeur-East were administratively merged into ArcelorMittal Long Products Canada.

== Demographics ==
In the 2021 Census of Population conducted by Statistics Canada, Contrecoeur had a population of 9,480 living in 4,116 of its 4,252 total private dwellings, a change of 20.2% from its 2016 population of 7,887. With a land area of 62.2 km^{2} (24.0 sq mi), it had a population density of 152.4/km^{2} (394.7/sq mi) in 2021.

Population trend:

- Population in 2021: 9,480 (2016 to 2021 population change: 20.2%)
- Population in 2016: 7,887
- Population in 2011: 6,252
- Population in 2006: 5,678
- Population in 2001: 5,222
- Population in 1996: 5,331
- Population in 1991: 5,501
- Population in 1986: 5,553
- Population in 1981: 5,449
Canada census – Contrecoeur community profile

	2021	2016	2011
Population	9,480 (+20.2% from 2016)	7,887 (+26.2% from 2011)	6,252 (+10.1% from 2006)
Land area	62.20 km^{2} (24.02 sq mi)	61.51 km^{2} (23.75 sq mi)	61.19 km^{2} (23.63 sq mi)
Population density	152.4/km^{2} (395/sq mi)	128.2/km^{2} (332/sq mi)	102.2/km^{2} (265/sq mi)
Median age	38.8 (M: 38.8, F: 38.8)	40.5 (M: 40.1, F: 41.2)	44.6 (M: 43.7, F: 45.5)
Private dwellings	4,252 (total) 4,116 (occupied)	3,688 (total)	2,979 (total)
Median household income	$82,000	$64,347	$54,894

References: 2021 2016 2011

Canada Census Mother Tongue - Contrecœur, Quebec
Census	Total	French			English			French & English			Other		
Year	Responses	Count	Trend	Pop %	Count	Trend	Pop %	Count	Trend	Pop %	Count	Trend	Pop %
2021	9,440	8,900	▲18.0%	94.3%	120	▲20.0%	1.3%	80	▲128.6%	0.8%	265	▲82.8%	2.8%
2016	7,840	7,540	▲25.1%	96.2%	100	▲25.0%	1.3%	35	▲133.3%	0.4%	145	▲123.1%	1.8%
2011	6,185	6,025	▲11.3%	96.41%	80	▲128.6%	1.29%	15	▼62.5%	0.24%	65	▼27.8%	1.05%
2006	5,580	5,415	▲7.2%	97.04%	35	▼12.5%	0.63%	40	▲ n/a%	0.72%	90	▲100.0%	1.61%
2001	5,135	5,050	▼1.7%	98.34%	40	▼42.9%	0.78%	0	0.0%	0.00%	45	▲80.0%	0.88%
1996	5,235	5,140	n/a	98.18%	70	n/a	1.34%	0	n/a	0.00%	25	n/a	0.48%

== Education ==
Centre de services scolaire des Patriotes operates francophone public schools, including:

- École des Coeurs-Vaillants
- École Mère-Marie-Rose

The Riverside School Board operates anglophone public schools, including:

- Harold Sheppard Elementary School in Sorel-Tracy
- Heritage Regional High School in Longueuil

== Gallery ==
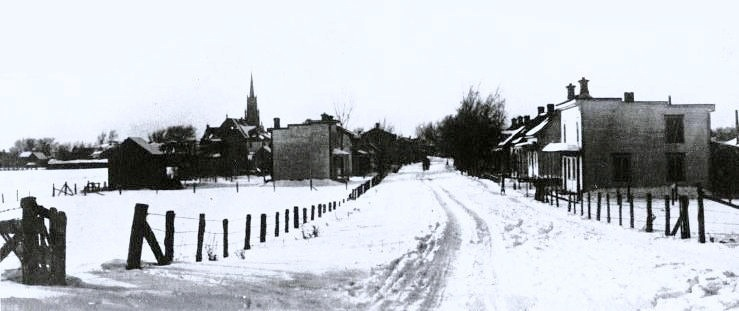
Rue de la Station Contrecœur around 1910

== See also ==
- List of cities in Quebec
