= Frédéric Martens =

French photographer and engraver (1806–1885)

- Friedrich von Martens
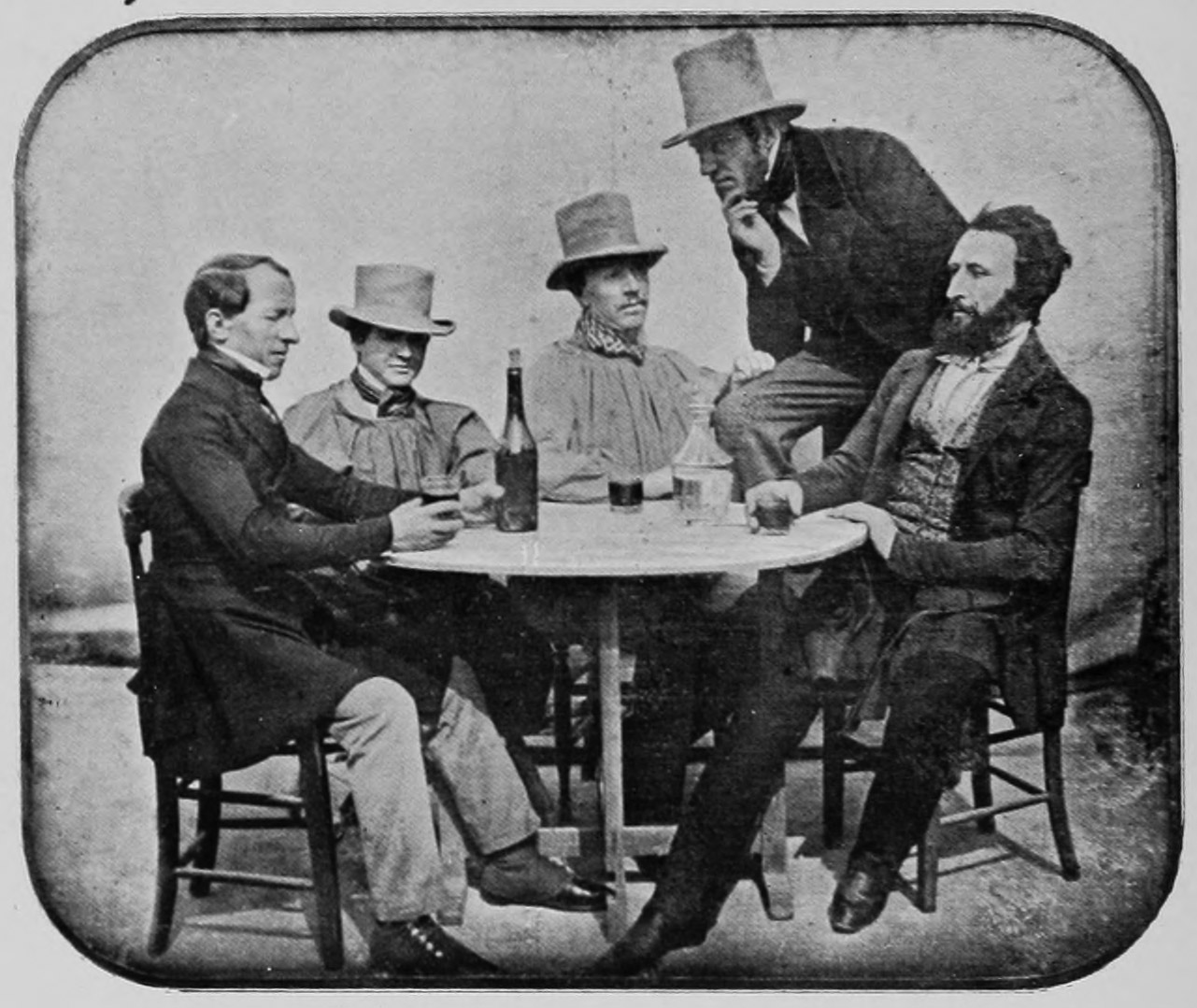
- 1844 daguerreotype of (from left) Noël Paymal Lerebours, 2 unknown men, Frédéric Martens and Marc Antoine Auguste Gaudin.
- Born: Friedrich von Martens; December 16, 1806; Venice, Italy
- Died: January 12, 1885 (aged 78); Paris, France
- Other name: Frédéric Vincent Martens
- Occupations: photographer, engraver
- Honours: Knight of the National Order of the Legion of Honor

Frédéric Vincent Martens, born Friedrich von Martens (December 16, 1806 – January 12, 1885) was an Italian-French photographer, engraver and inventor who spent most of his life and career in Paris. He also lived and worked in Italy, Switzerland, Germany, England and Belgium. Martens is best known for being the pioneer of panoramic-view photography.

== Early life ==
Martens was born on December 16, 1806 in Venice, in the Veneto region in northeastern Italy. His family was originally from the Kingdom of Württemberg and his father was a German diplomat.

Martens studied at the Accademia di Belle Arti di Venezia, literally The Academy of Fine Arts of Venice.

== Career ==
=== Before 1840 ===
Martens began his artistic career painting Italian landscapes. However, in the 1830s, he made a name for himself in western Europe as an engraver. He produced many steel engraving prints of Swiss artist's works such as Johann Ludwig Bleuler, Johann Rudolf Bühlmann, Johann Jakob Tanner and David Alois Schmid, or of his own drawings.

=== 1840s ===
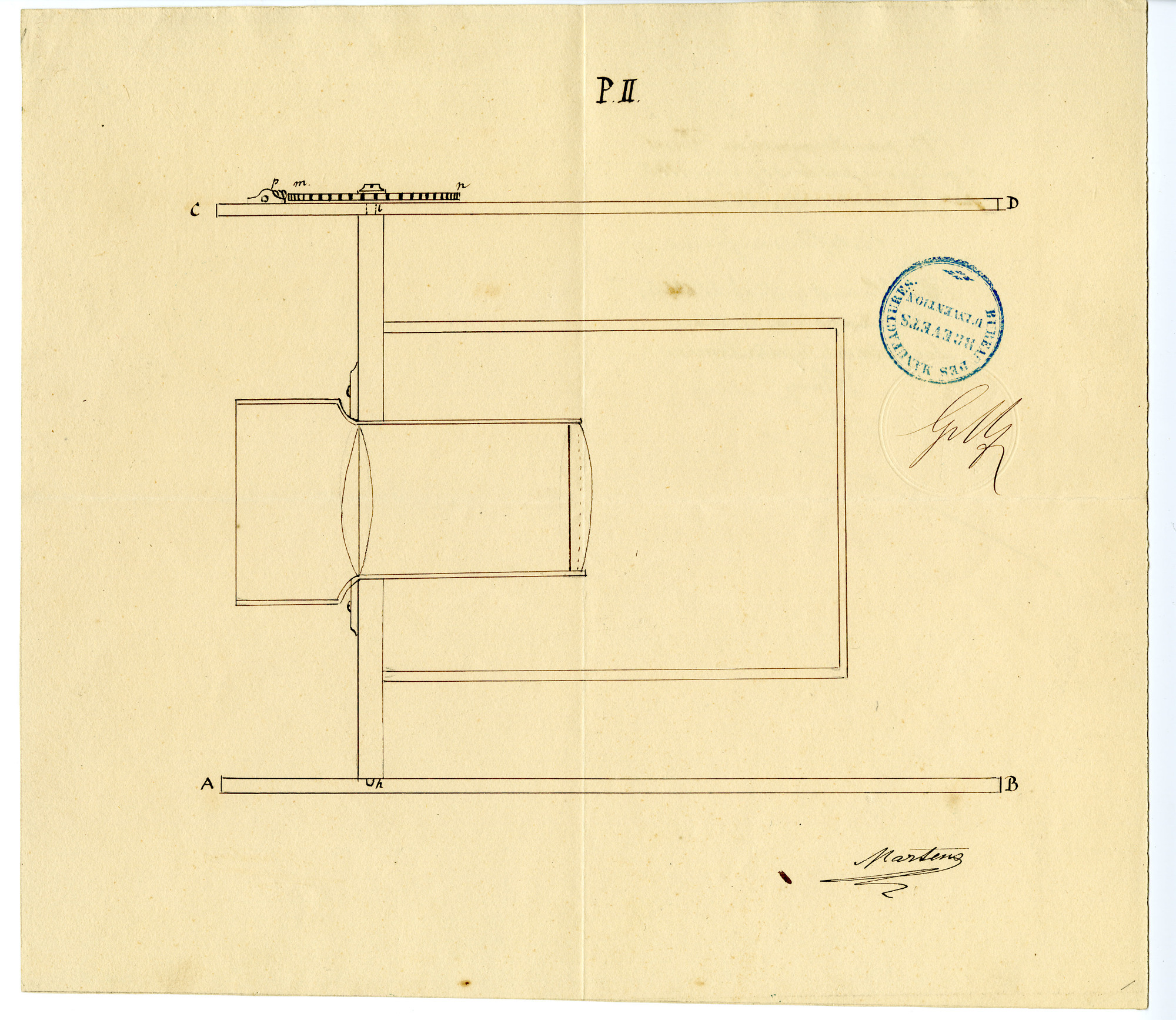
Mechanical drawing of the Megaskop-Kamera by Frédéric Martens.

In the early 1840s Martens's interest for photography awakened and he started working with photographers like Noël Paymal Lerebours and Pierre-Gustave Joly de Lotbinière.

From 1840 Martens worked in Lausanne with Samuel Heer and Marc Secretan on making daguerreotypes and on the process.

In 1844 Martens was commissioned to take photographs on a French government expedition to the Alps.

In 1845 Martens lived in Paris (17 rue Férou, in the 6th arrondissement). There he invented the Megaskop-Kamera, the first successful and technically effective panoramic camera. The first version of this camera featured a 1/4 swing lens and had a 150-degree arc. 4.7" × 15" curved daguerreotype plates were used on this model. A patent for this work is delivered on June 11, 1845 by the Minister of Agriculture and Commerce.

=== 1850s ===
In 1851 Martens was renowned as one of the best tablotypists (according to Henry Fox Talbot). This year, Martens exhibited several albumen prints of architectural views at the Great Exhibition in London, for which he was awarded the Council Medal.

Also on view was his panorama of Mont Blanc created with 14 calotypes. It was reshown at the 1855 Exposition Universelle in Paris.

On October 29, 1855, Martens was decorated with the National Order of the Legion of Honor (Knight).

=== 1860s to the end of his life ===
Until his death in 1885, Martens practiced photography and produced daguerreotypes and albumen prints. His most famous works are his panoramas of the river Seine.

== Death and archives ==
Martens died on January 12, 1885 at age 78 in his second apartment in the 6th arrondissement of Paris (84 rue Bonaparte). Most of his archive was burnt in 1871 during the Paris Commune.

== Collections ==
- Smithsonian National Museum of American History
- Musée d'Orsay
- Bibliothèque nationale de France
- Swiss National Library
