= Abal =

Abal (Spanish pronunciation: [aˈβal]) is a surname. Notable people with this surname include:

- Daniel Lede Abal (born 1976), German politician
- Diego Abal (born 1971), Argentinian football referee
- Francisco Abal (1951–1972), Uruguayan rugby player
- José Abal (born 1961), Spanish athlete
- Juan Manuel Abal Medina (1945–2025), Argentine journalist and politician
- Juan Manuel Abal Medina Jr. (born 1968), Argentinian politician
- Pablo Martín Abal (born 1977), Argentinian swimmer
- Sam Abal (born 1958), Papua New Guinean politician
- Tei Abal (1932?–1994), member of the parliament of Papua New Guinea

== See also ==
- Calligonum comosum
