= Bleuler =

Bleuler is a German language surname. Notable people with the surname include:

- Eugen Bleuler (1857–1939), Swiss psychiatrist
- Hermann Bleuler (1837–1912), Swiss engineer and army officer
- Johann Heinrich Bleuler (1758–1823), Swiss painter
- Johann Ludwig Bleuler (1792–1850), Swiss painter
- Konrad Bleuler (1912–1992), Swiss physicist
- Manfred Bleuler (1903–1994), Swiss physician and psychiatrist
