= Federley =

Federley is a surname. Notable people with the surname include:

- Alex Federley (1864–1932), Swedish-Finnish graphic artist
- Fredrick Federley (born 1978), Swedish politician
- Harry Federley (1879–1951), Finnish geneticist and eugenicist

== See also ==
- Fedderly
- Federle
