= Fedderly =

Fedderly is a surname. Notable people with the surname include:

- Bernie Fedderly, Canadian drag racing crew chief
- David Fedderly (born 1953), American orchestral tuba player and teacher
- Greg Fedderly, American opera singer

== See also ==
- Federle
- Federley
