= Frédéric Goupil-Fesquet =

French photographer (1857–1927)

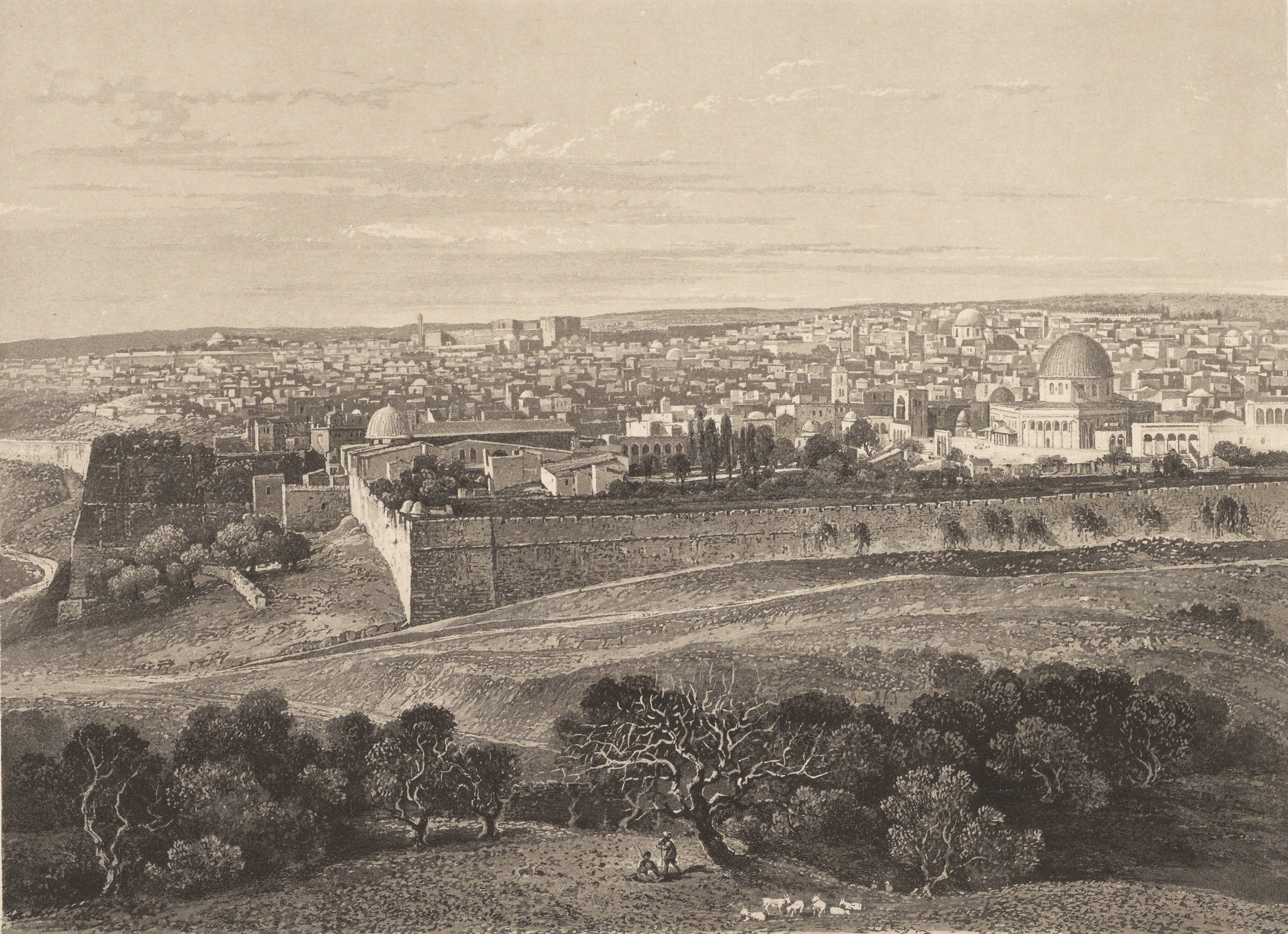
- Jerusalem, Fesquet. Dec. 1839.
- Born: Frédéric Goupil-Fesquet; 1817; Paris, France
- Died: 1878 (aged 60–61); Paris, France
- Known for: photography, painting

Frédéric Goupil-Fesquet (1817–1878) was a French painter and photographer who took the first ever photograph of Jerusalem during a trip he made from France in 1839.

== Journey to Jerusalem ==
In October 1839, Goupil-Fesquet sailed from the port of Marseille to Alexandria in Egypt on a photographic expedition. A few months earlier, on August 19, 1839, Daguerre published the daguerreotype method of photography. Fesquet's journey was innovative: he carried photographic equipment with him, had briefly studied the fundamentals of photography beforehand, and took pictures in some places that had not been photographed before. He went on a journey with a large format camera, a tripod, and boxes containing photographic metal plates and chemicals that would serve him on a journey of several months.

Until the development of photography, people read about famous sites of the world and had to be content with written descriptions or illustrations and drawings of the sites. The development of photography enabled the distribution of photographs of these sites. These photographs were a revolution for the general public, who were unable to visit the famous sites themselves (only a very small percentage of the population were able to travel to foreign countries at that time).

As part of this passion for photographs of famous sites, Noël Paymal Lerebours, a French painter and photographer, turned to producing photo stories. He is the one who provided Fesquet with the camera he used during that journey. The cameras that were used during this period were large-format cameras ("5x7 in this case).

On the trip, Fesquet accompanied his uncle, the French painter Horace Vernet. Vernet was also Fesquet's painting teacher, and Vernet tried capturing pictures as well. Some of the sources indicate that Fesquet's cousin Charles Marie Bouton also joined the trip and other sources indicate that Pierre-Gustave Joly de Lotbinière participated in part of the journey.

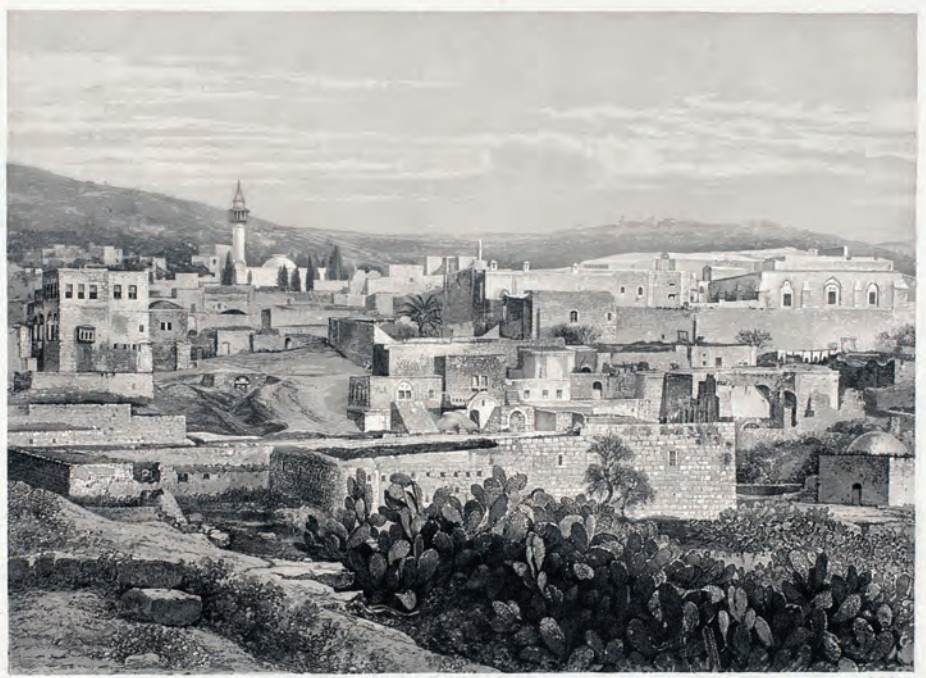
Nazareth, Fesquet . Dec. 1839.

The sailing voyage ended in Alexandria, Egypt, from which the delegation continued to Cairo and farther south to take photographs of the Pyramids and various other sites. From Cairo, the delegation travelled by land to Jerusalem, where they stayed from December 11 to 14, 1839. During this time, Fesquet photographed Jerusalem from the Mount of Olives, including the Temple Mount, the city walls, and its surroundings. From Jerusalem the expedition continued to Acre, where Fesquet photographed the old city from its rooftops, the people staying there, and the Crusader fortress in the background. Finally, he photographed the city of Nazareth and its surroundings. From Nazareth, the delegation continued to Damascus, then Turkey, and returned to Paris in the beginning of 1840.

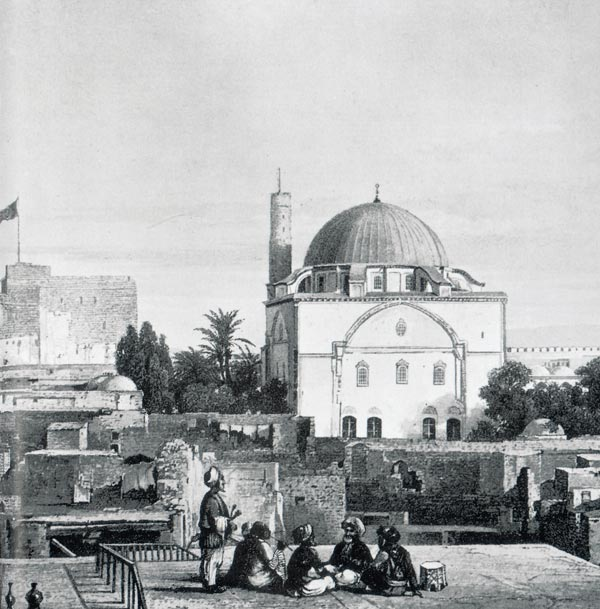
Acre, Fesquet Dec. 1839.

Upon his return, Goupil-Fesquet did not publish any more photographs and focused on painting. There is no evidence of Goupil-Fesquet ever using a camera after that point, but he did publish a travel report: Voyage d'Horace Vernet en Orient, 2 volumes, Brussels, Société Typographique Belge, Ad. Wahlen et Compagnie, 1844, 176 + 201 p.

== Works ==
Fesque was known as a painter, and his short activity as a photographer, while very young with no experience, ended with few photographs that were popular at that time due to the demand for pictures of famous sites. His work was exhibited at the Paris Salon.
