= Konrad Corradi =

Swiss landscape painter, illustrator and gouache artist

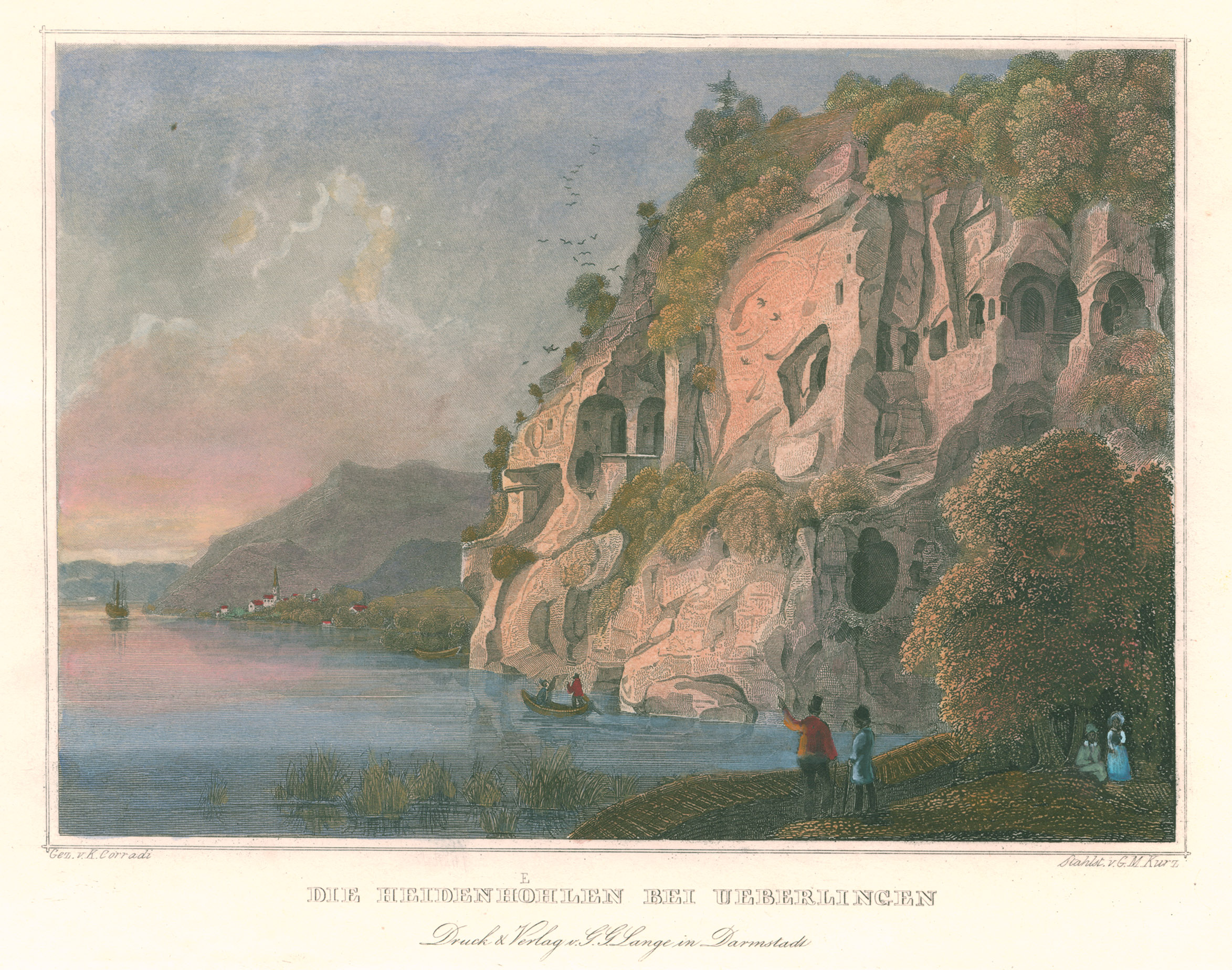
The Heidenhöhlen, near Überlingen; steel engraving by Georg Michael Kurz, from a drawing by Corradi

Konrad Corradi, originally Johann Corradi, (2 September 1813 in Oberneunforn – 9 April 1878 in Laufen-Uhwiesen) was a Swiss landscape painter, illustrator and gouache artist.

== Life and work ==
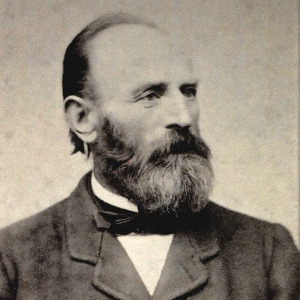
Konrad Corradi

In 1821, he began a six-year apprenticeship at the studios of Johann Heinrich Bleuler, the Younger (1787–1857) in Feuerthalen, which he completed in 1827. From 1833, he worked at the painting school and publishing house operated by Bleuler's brother, Johann Ludwig, at Schloss Laufen.

In 1837, he went to Meiringen, where he made the acquaintance of Johann Wilhelm Schirmer, who introduced him to oil painting. The following year, he married Elisabeth Egli from Uhwiesen, where he eventually settled. He continued to travel extensively in the summer, until he became too infirm.

In 1863, he was a co-founder of the Schweizer Alpen-Club.

Among his best known works were the illustrations commissioned by Gustav Georg Lange, a publisher in Darmstadt, for his book Das Großherzogthum Baden in malerischen Originalansichen ("The Grand Duchy of Baden in picturesque original views").

== Sources ==
- Robert Pfaff: Die Bleuler Malschule auf Schloss Laufen am Rheinfall, Verlag Kuhn-Druck, 1985. ISBN 978-3-906660-00-4
- "Corradi, Konrad". SIKART Lexicon on art in Switzerland.
