= Pierre-Gustave Joly de Lotbinière =

French businessman and photographer (1798–1865)

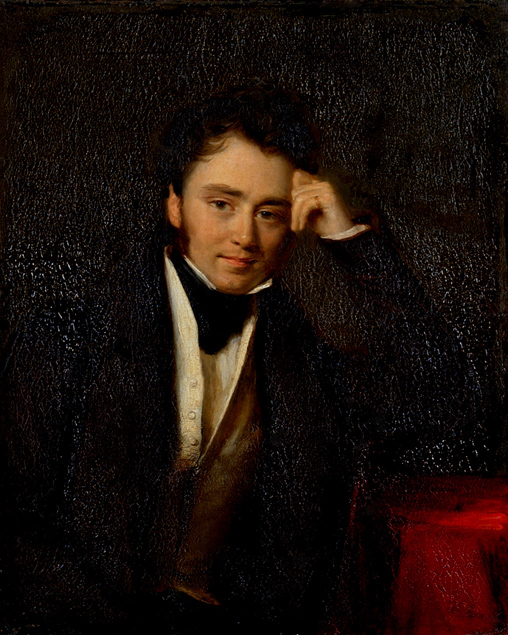
Pierre-Gaspard-Gustave Joly de Lotbinière

Pierre-Gaspard-Gustave Joly de Lotbinière (February 5, 1798 - June 8, 1865) was a Swiss businessman and amateur daguerreotypist, born in Frauenfeld, Switzerland and citizen of the Republic of Geneva, and married to a Canadian seigneuress. Famous for being the first to photograph the Acropolis of Athens and some ancient Egyptian monuments, he is also the father of Sir Henri-Gustave Joly de Lotbinière, Premier of Quebec from 1878 to 1879.

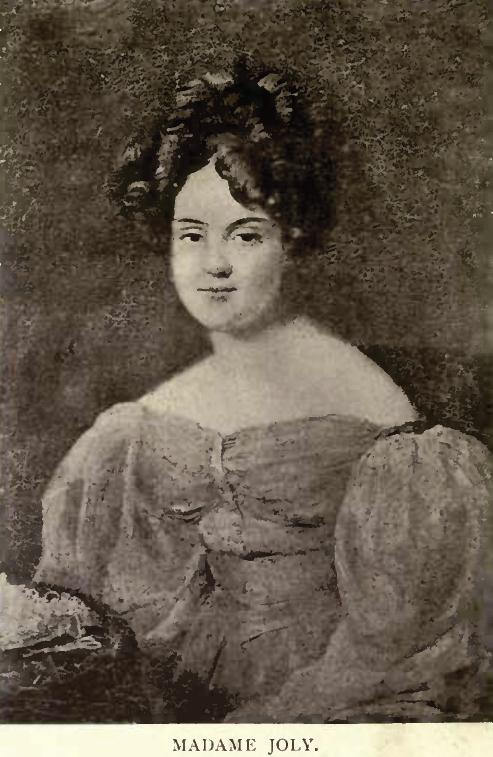
Julie Christine Chartier Joly de Lotbinière

== Biography ==
=== Early life ===
Pierre-Gustave Joly was the son of Antoine Joly de Marval, merchant, and of Ursula Fehr de Brunner. Early in the 1800s, his family settled in Épernay in Champagne, where they specialized in wine trading. While the father and the eldest son, Moïse-Salomon, remained in Épernay, Pierre-Gustave travelled far and wide to find new buyers, first concentrating on Europe, including Germany, Poland, Russia and Sweden, eventually even crossing the Atlantic Ocean to visit the United States and Canada.

While there, he met and on December 17, 1828, married in Montreal Julie-Christine Chartier de Lotbinière, daughter of Michel-Eustache-Gaspard-Alain Chartier de Lotbinière 2nd Marquis de Lotbinière. The seigneury of Lotbinière near Quebec City was her dowry. After his wedding, he unofficially added "de Lotbinière" to the first part of his family name. The couple spent the first two years of their marriage in Épernay, where in 1829 their first son, Henri-Gustave, was born, then lived from 1830 in Lotbinière. There, Joly managed his wife's possessions as well as his own investments in French Guiana and the Canadian railroad. He also sometimes travelled to France.

=== Traveller in Greece, Egypt and the Holy Land ===
In 1839, Joly was in Paris at the time when Louis Daguerre unveiled his early photographic process to the scientific world. Embarking on a trip to the Middle East, Pierre-Gustave acquired one of the first daguerreotype cameras from Noël Paymal Lerebours in order to make photographic records of the ancient monuments he was about to see on his journey. He travelled via Malta to Greece, where he visited Athens and other places, and then carried on to Alexandria. There, he met the painter Horace Vernet and his nephew, Frédéric Goupil-Fesquet, who were also carrying daguerreotype equipment. The three men undertook some excursions in Egypt together before parting company. Joly then travelled to the Holy Land, Syria and Turkey. Back in Paris, five of his 92 plates were published by Lerebours in his book Excursions daguerriennes (1840–41), others by architect Hector Horeau for his book Panorama from Egypt and Nubia (1841). Due to technological restrictions, the daguerreotypes themselves could not be reproduced and, instead, were copied as engravings which could then be printed. None of Joly's original plates has been identified, and they may well be lost. What they contained is known through his diary which was published in 2011.

=== Later life ===
He returned to his family in Quebec and is not known to ever taking any further photographs after this trip. Instead, Joly built a summer estate at Pointe-Platon near Sainte-Croix. Known today as Domaine Joly-De Lotbinière, the estate has been entered in the register of Canada's Historic Places.

In 1861, after 33 years of marriage, Joly separated from his wife who, in the previous year, had signed over the seigneury of Lotbinière to their eldest son Henri-Gustave. Joly returned to Paris where he died in 1865 and was buried in the Montmartre Cemetery. His wife died at age 77 in Quebec on October 24, 1887 having survived her husband for many years; her remains was buried at Vaudreuil.

== Children ==
The couple had three children, one daughter and two sons.

His eldest son, Sir Henri-Gustave Joly served as Premier of Quebec and Lieutenant-Governor of British Columbia. Joly inherited the seigneury of Lotbinière from his mother in 1860, and later the family estate of Pointe Platon. He added the last part of his mother's maiden name "de Lotbinière" to the first part of his father's name "Joly", by Act of Parliament, in 1888. He was created a K.C.M.G. by Queen Victoria, 1895.

His daughter Amelie-Ursule Joly married Captain Henry George (H.G.) Savage, R.E., and their daughter, Alice, became the Vicomtesse de Coux after marrying Alfred Aimé Etienne Michel de Coux.

His son Edmond Joly, entered the army, being gazetted to the 32nd Regiment. While on sick leave, he volunteered for service in the Crimea, and was present with the Connaught Rangers at the taking of Sebastopol. In 1857 he left for India, to rejoin his old regiment. Edmond Joly was with the Connaught Rangers at the Siege of Sevastopol (1854–1855), but was killed at the Siege of Lucknow September 25, 1857.

== Images ==
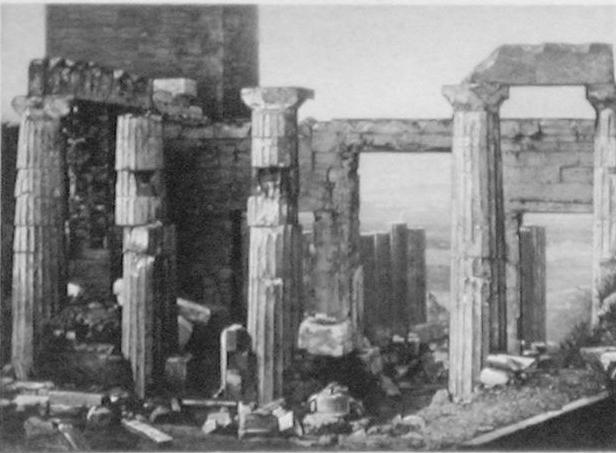
The Propylaea, Athens, in October, 1839

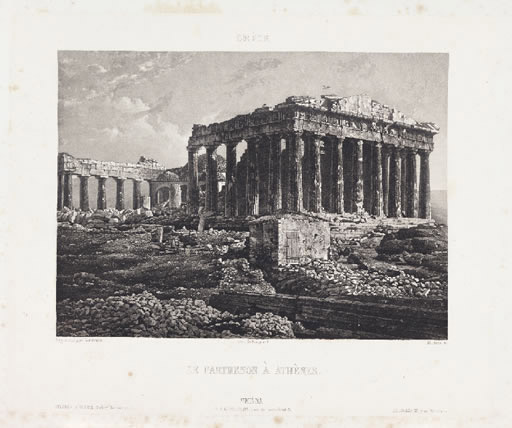
The Parthenon, Athens, in October, 1839

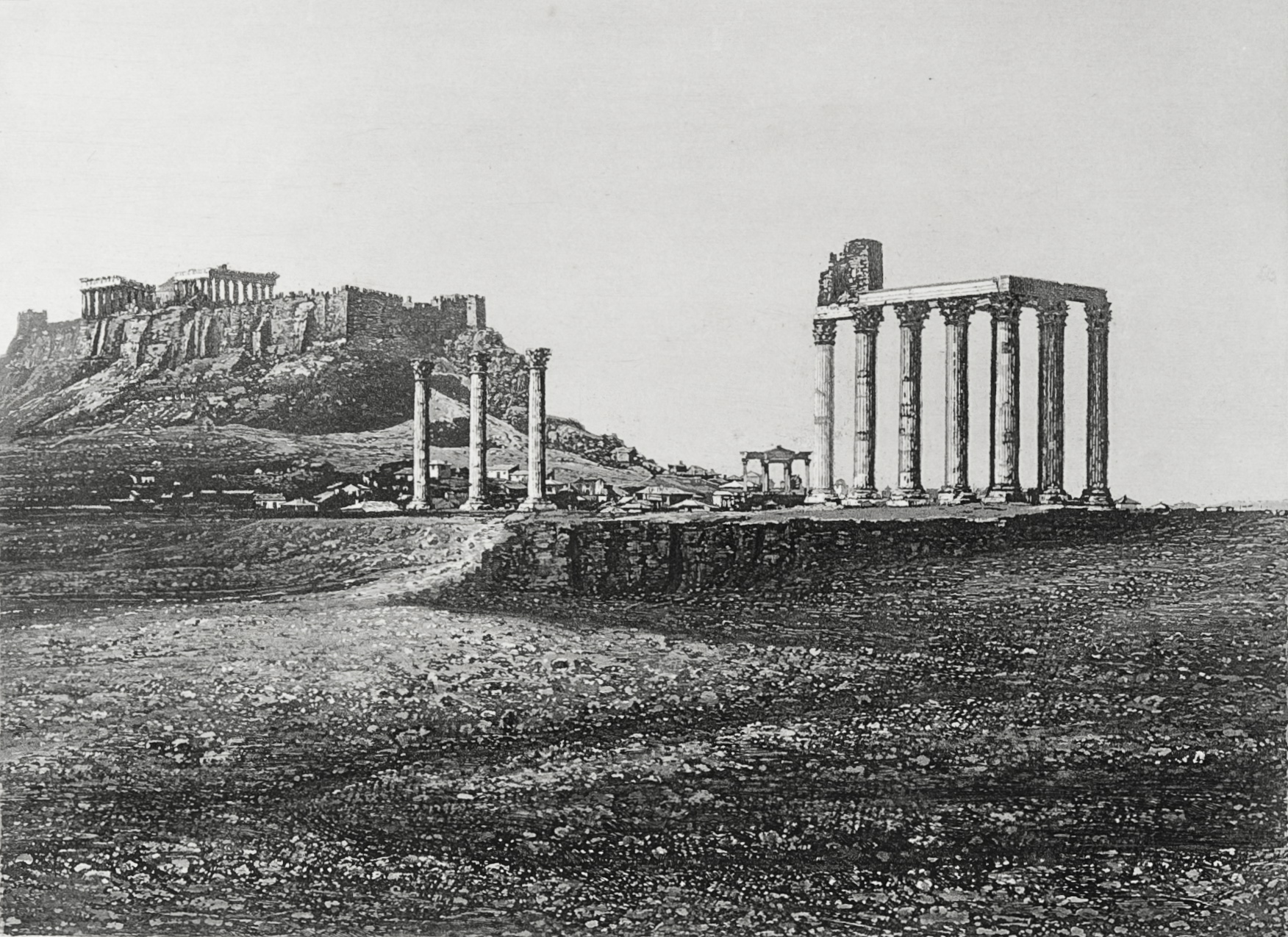
The Temple of Olympian Zeus, Athens, in October, 1839

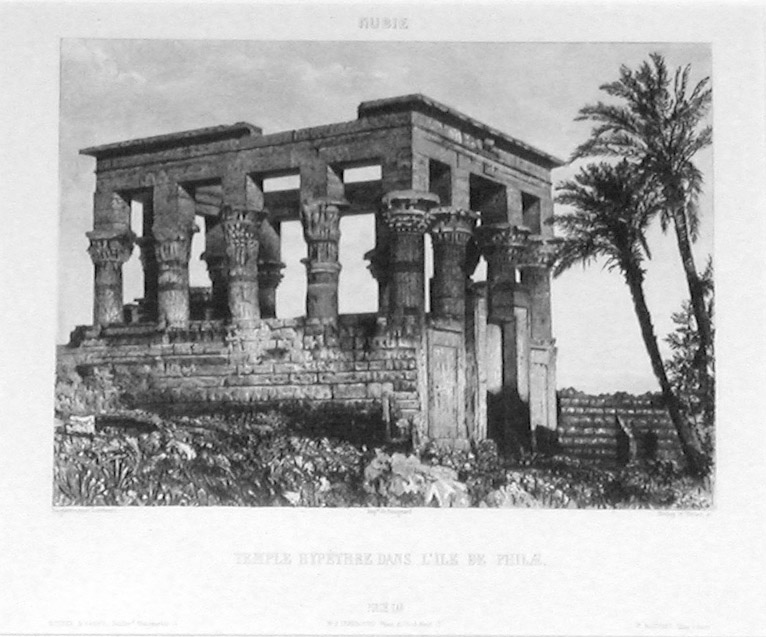
Trajan's Kiosk, Philae, in December, 1839

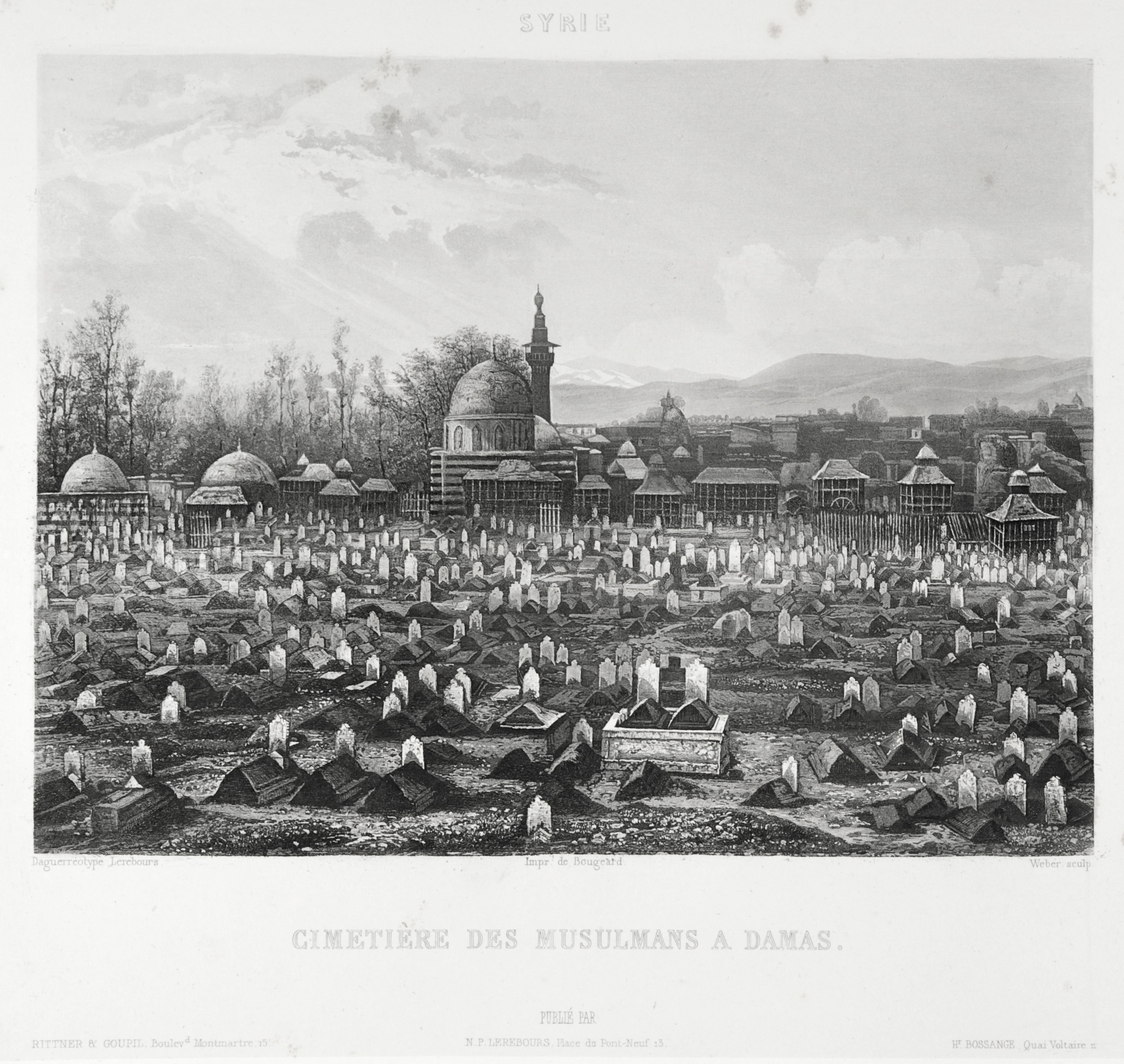
Bab al-Saghir cemetery, Damascus, in March, 1840

== Other sources ==
- Eleanor Brown, The world's first daguerreotype images : Canadian travel photographer Pierre Gustave Gaspard Joly de Lotbinière, in The Archivist n°118, November 1999, pp. 22–29.
- Hazen Sise, The Seigneur of Lotbinière - His "Excursions daguerriennes", Canadian Art, 1951, Vol. IX, no 1.
- Leclerc, Hélène (2002). Fides (ed.). Domaine Joly-De Lotibnière. Fides, Editions. ISBN 978-2-7621-2356-2.
- Lerebours, Noël-Marie Paymal (1840–1843). Lerebours (ed.). Excursions daguerriennes : vues et monuments les plus remarquables du globe.
