= Harry Federley =

Finnish zoologist, geneticist and professor (1879–1951)

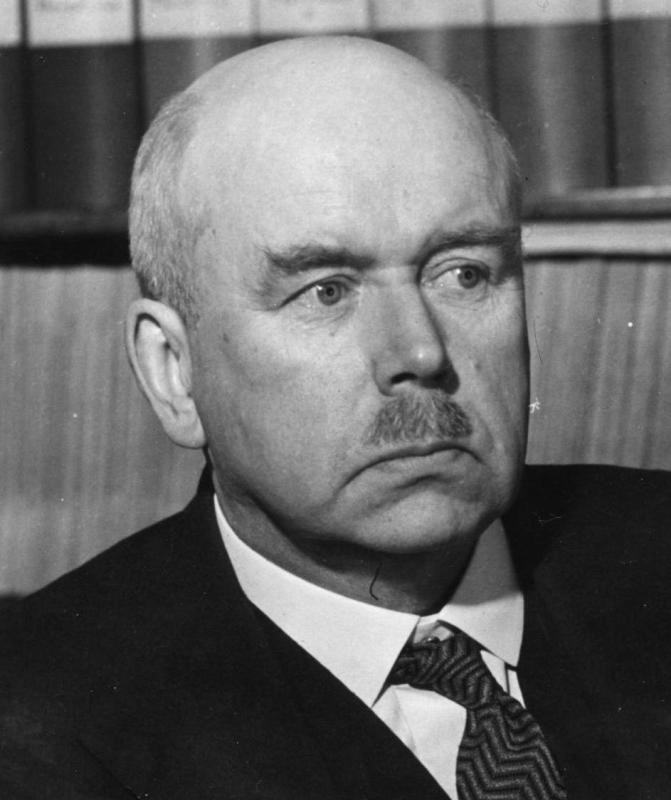

Harry Federley (22 March 1879 – 13 November 1951) was a Finnish zoologist and pioneer of genetics. He conducted hybridization experiments on moths and was later also involved in eugenics in Finland. He was the founder of the department of genetics at the University of Helsinki.

== Life and work ==
Federley was born in Viipuri in a family of business people. His mother was of German origin while his father was Swedish. He went to study at the University of Helsinki where he examined the development of lepidopteran embryos. For his doctoral research in 1906 he examined the effect of temperature and moisture in the pupal period and its effect on the pigmentation of lepidopteran wings. He also made experiments on breeding of the Pygaera moths under Enzio Reuter. In 1910 Federley went to Jena to study embryology (Entwicklungsgeschichte) and examine Haeckel's biogenetic law but shifted interests to genetics. He examined Johannsen's Elementen der exakten Erblichkeitslehre and Bateson's works working with Ludwig Plate on mice in addition to his moths. In 1913 he wrote on chromosome ratios in Pygaera with cross-breeding between P. anachoreta, P. curtula and P. pigra which produced infertile offspring. He showed that they had two sets of chromosomes (a pair each from each parent) rather than one set. From 1909 he gave lectures on heredity at the University of Helsinki and in 1915 he was made docent of genetics rather than of zoology and thus became the first teacher of genetics in Finland. In 1923 he became extraordinary personal professor and he then established a department of genetics. He retired in 1949.

Federley became aware of eugenics and the German circles which included Ludwig Plate who contributed to the journal Archiv für Rassen- und Gesellschaftsbiologie. Federley wrote reviews for the same journal while he worked in Jena. In 1911, Federley attended the International Hygiene Exhibition in Dresden where a section was devoted to eugenics. Federley became a proponent of eugenics in Finland and worked in association with the Public Health Association of Swedish-speaking Finland (founded in 1921, Samfundet Folkhälsan i Svenska Finland) with suggestions on sterilization of the "feeble-minded" although this was voluntary. Federley worked with the Florin Commission along with Ossian Schauman and Jarl Hagelstam. He was involved in promoting positive eugenics, the rewarding of Swedish-speaking mothers in Finland. His lectures included a course in “Human heredity and eugenics” which he offered until 1946. The teaching included readings from the German textbook by Baur, Fischer and Lenz, Grundrißder menschlichen Erblichkeitslehre und Rassenhygiene.
