= Federle =

Federle is a surname. Notable people with the surname include:

- Egidius Federle (1810–1876), German landscape painter and illustrator
- Helmut Federle (born 1944), Swiss painter
- Lisa Federle (born 1961), German physician
- Michael Federle, American manager and publisher
- Tim Federle (born 1980), American writer and screenwriter
