= Emanuel Labhardt =

Swiss landscape painter, graphic artist and lithographer

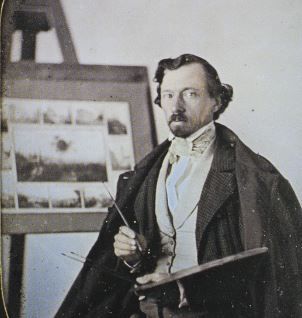
Emanuel Labhardt (date unknown)

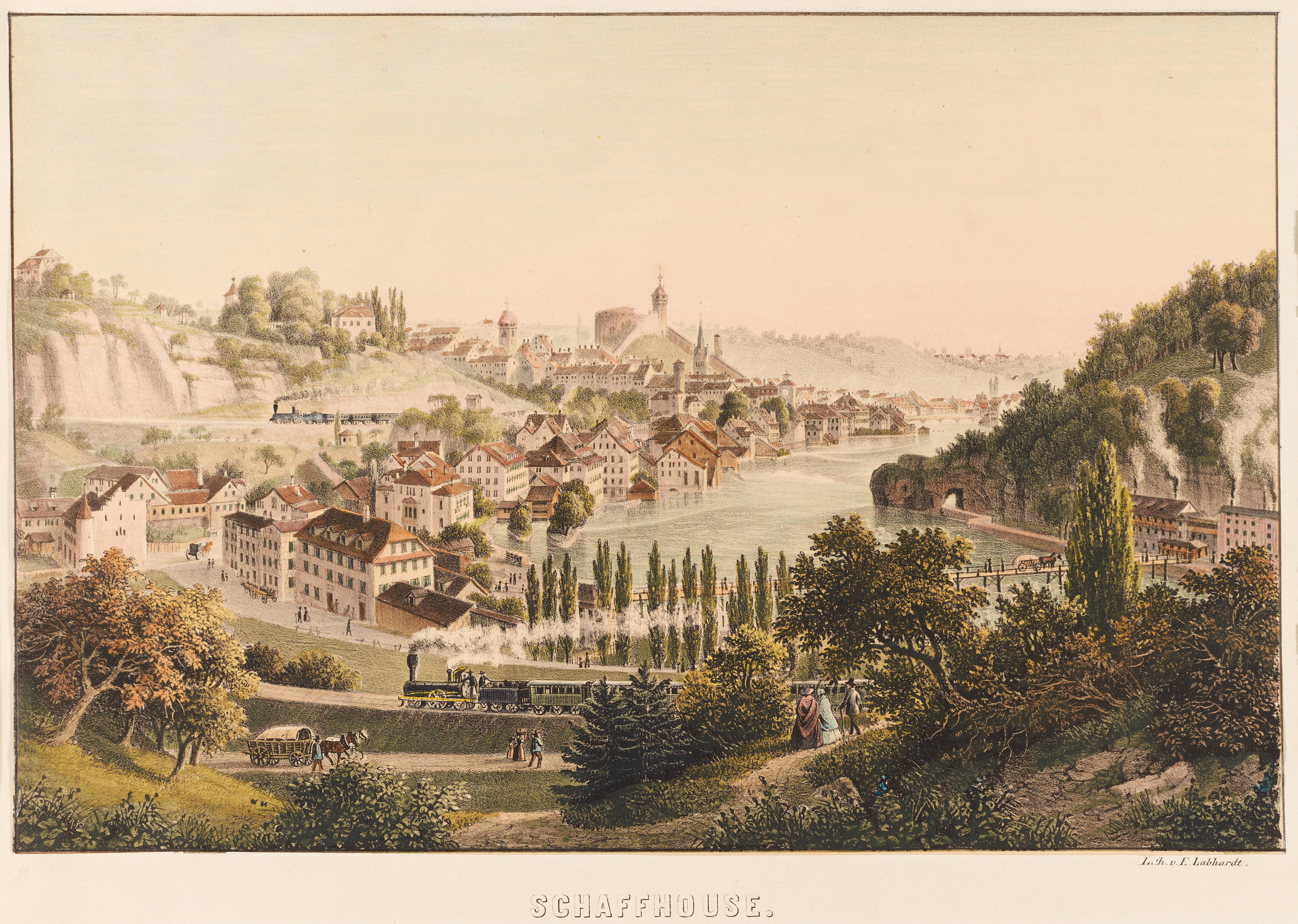
View of Schaffhausen, from the West

Emanuel Labhardt (11 March 1810, Steckborn - 10 June 1874, Feuerthalen) was a Swiss landscape painter, graphic artist and lithographer.

== Life and work ==
From 1827, he was an apprentice for drawing, painting, etching and lithography in the studios of Johann Heinrich Bleuler, the Younger (1787–1857) in Feuerthalen; under the supervision of Johann Heinrich Wirz (1784-1866). In 1832, he married Wirz's daughter Caroline.

The following year, he went to work for Bleuler's brother, Johann Ludwig, who had an art school and publishing firm at Laufen Castle. During his time there, under commission from his employer, he took several study trips to Bodensee, Central Switzerland and other European countries.

In 1837, he founded his own lithographic company in Feuerthalen. Caroline died from giving birth to their sixth child. He eventually married her youngest sister, Else, with whom he had nine more children. During the Sonderbund War, he served as a Captain. He also managed the post office in Feuerthalen and became the Gemeindepräsident (head of the Municipality) there in the late 1860s.

During his professional life, he mastered various other painting and printing techniques, such as watercolors, gouache, copper etching and aquatints. Of particular note is his 1866 publication, Album von Schaffhausen.

He died in 1874, after a brief, but serious illness.

== Sources ==
- "Labhardt, Emanuel". SIKART Lexicon on art in Switzerland.
- Manfred Weigele: Emanuel Labhardt, Landschaftsmaler aus Steckborn. Museum im Turmhof, Steckborn 2010, ISBN 978-3-033-02440-3 (Exhibition catalog). (Online).
