= Pointe-Platon Ecological Reserve =

Ecological reserve in Quebec, Canada

Coordinates: 46.6625°N 71.8417°W

- IUCN category Ia (strict nature reserve)
- Interactive map of Pointe-Platon Ecological Reserve
- Location: Sainte-Croix, Lotbinière Regional County Municipality, Québec, Canada
- Established: 1995

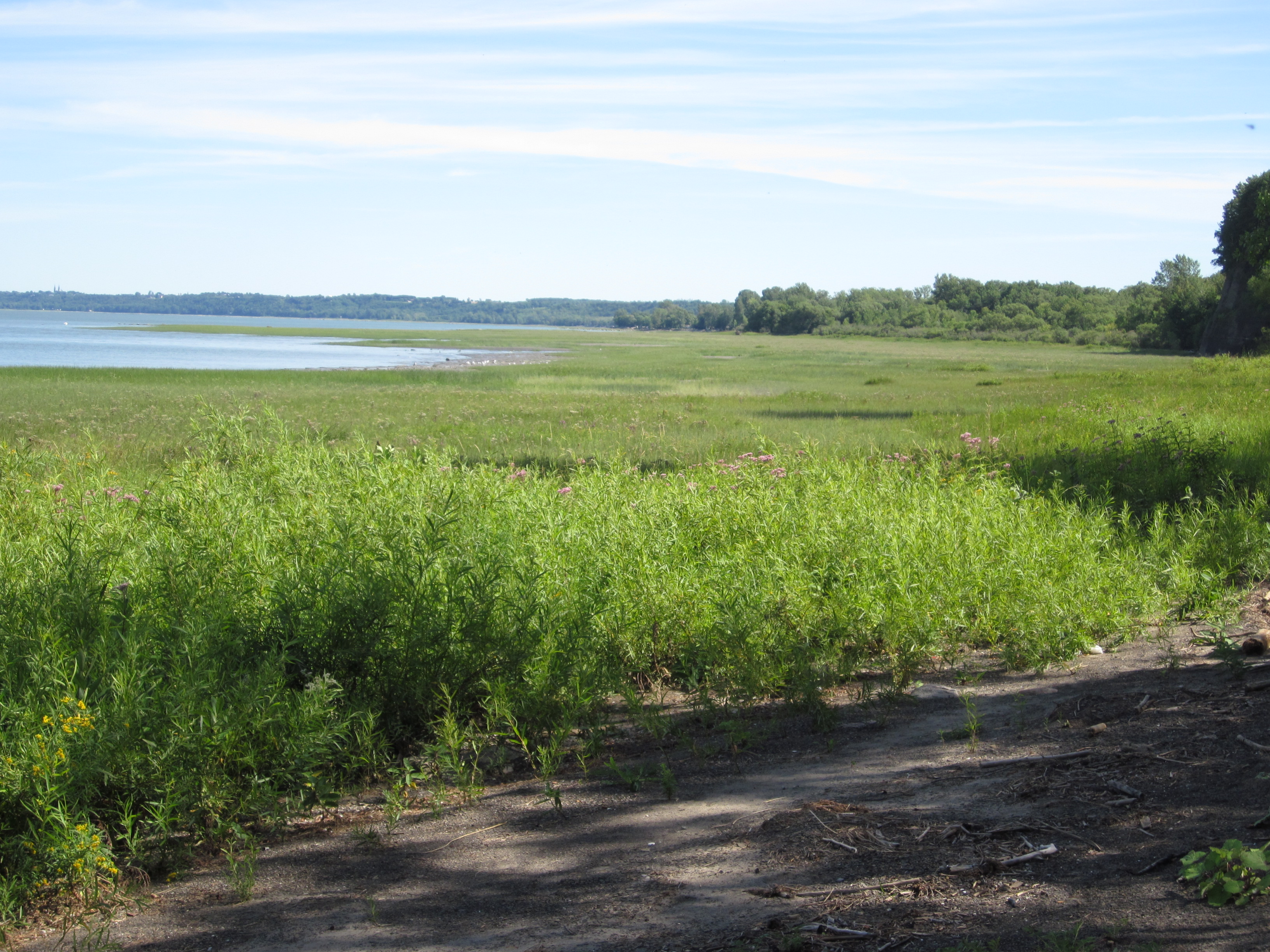
Pointe-Platon Ecological Reserve seen from the beach of Domaine Joly-De Lotbinière

Pointe-Platon Ecological Reserve is an ecological reserve in Quebec, Canada. It was established in 1995.

"Pointe Platon" was the name of the Manor House and estate which was occupied by the de Lotbinière family. Pierre-Gustave Joly de Lotbinière (1798-1865) and his wife Julie-Christine Chartier de Lotbinière, 5th seigneuresse of Lotbinière lived at "Pointe Platon" for several years
