= Lisa Federle =

German physician (born 1961)

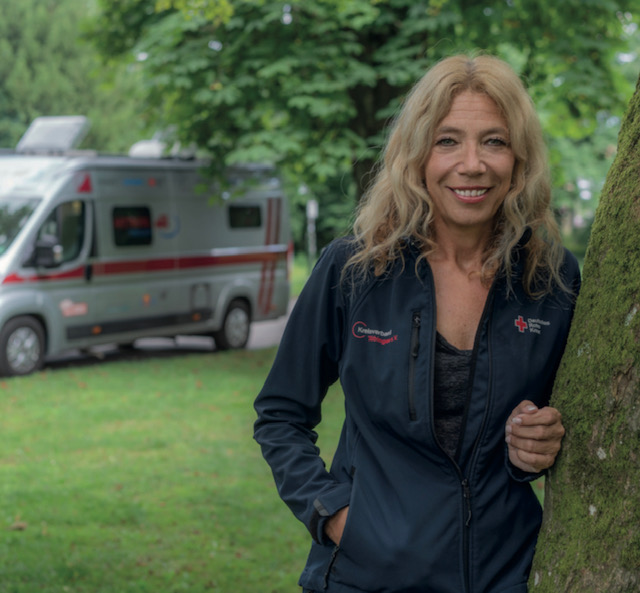
- Federle in front of the Tübingen medical mobile that is financed by donations
- Born: 31 July 1961 (age 64); Tübingen, West Germany
- Occupation: Physician

Lisa Federle (born 31 July 1961) is a German doctor and emergency physician. In 2015, she introduced a "mobile doctor's practice" in the Tübingen district to treat refugees in their emergency shelters as well as homeless people. During the COVID-19 pandemic, it became a mobile fever and diagnostic clinic. With the test strategy she had initiated, she adapted the Tübingen model for targeted pandemic control. In 2020, she was awarded the Federal Cross of Merit for her commitment.

== Life and career ==
Lisa Federle was born and raised in Tübingen, West Germany. She attended elementary school in 1968 and in 1972 the Wildermuth-Gymnasium Tübingen. After dropping out of school with two children, she worked in the catering trade without giving up her aspiration to become a doctor. After starting a family, she graduated from the evening grammar school in Reutlingen in 1986 and from secondary school in 1990. She then studied medicine at the University of Tübingen and graduated in 1998 with a doctorate at 37. After five years of training in anaesthesia and intensive care, she acquired specialist status.

In 2015, Federle developed a "mobile doctor's practice" for the Tübingen district so that refugees could receive medical care in their emergency accommodation. Other groups, such as homeless people, could also be cared for with this mobile service. In his laudatory speech on the occasion of the award of the Federal Cross of Merit, Federal President Frank-Walter Steinmeier praised her approach, stating that "The medical practice on wheels is still a model today. Without a long lead time, when the corona pandemic broke out, it was able to be equipped with a mobile test station and used immediately in care facilities whose situation was particularly difficult."

In May 2022, her autobiography "Auf krummen Wegen" was published. It became an instant success, entering the bestseller list at number 2.

Another book, "Vom Glück des Zuhörens", was published in October 2023.

Federle is married and the mother of four children.

== Affiliations ==
Federle is the deputy chairwoman of the district doctors, honorary president of the German Red Cross in Tübingen and the district's pandemic officer. She is a member of the CDU and represented it in the municipal council from 2009 to 2014. She has been a district councilor since 2014. In the state election on 27 March 2011 in Baden-Württemberg, she also ran and lost the direct mandate by 21 votes to The Greens candidate Daniel Lede Abal.

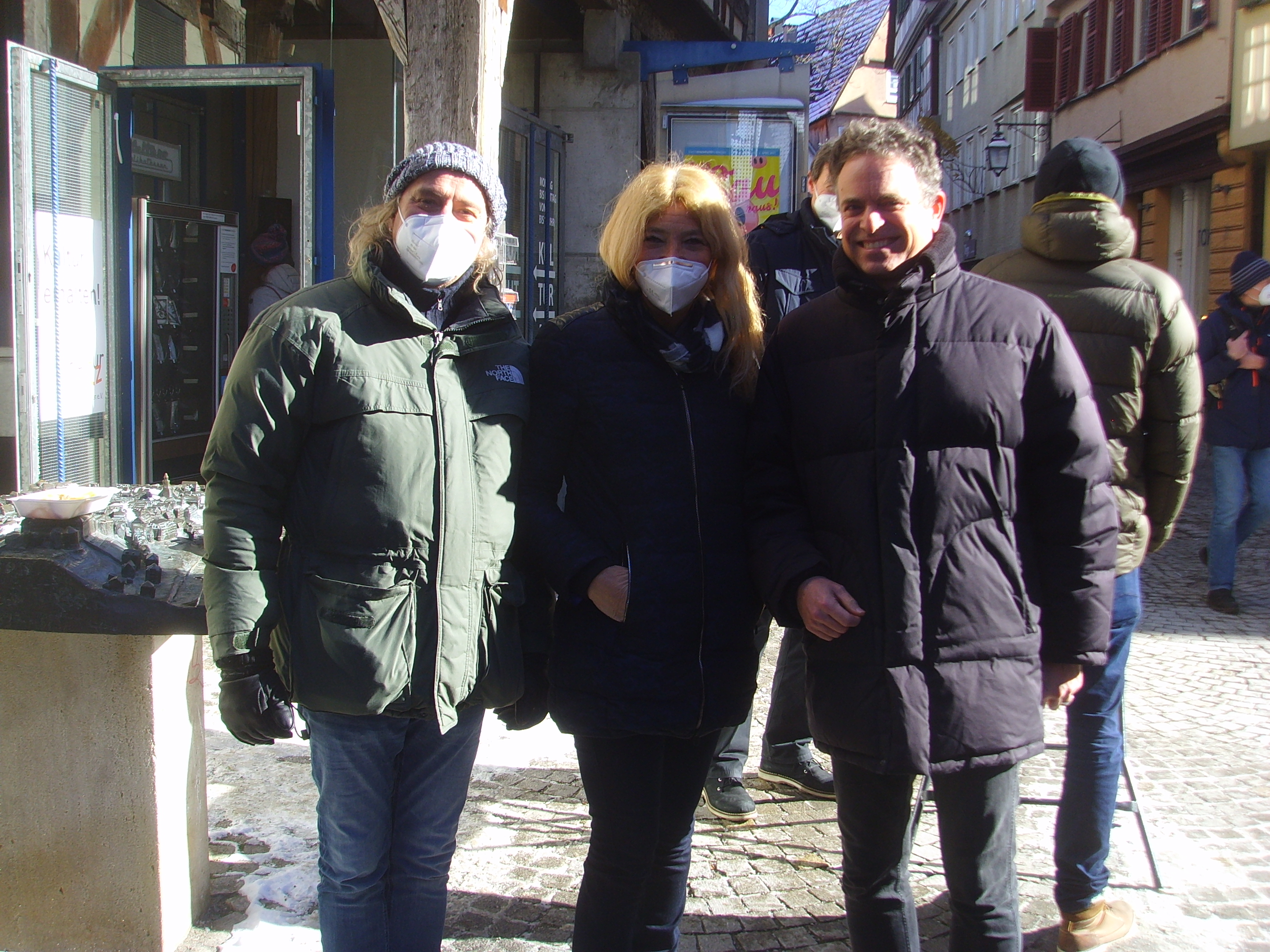
Singer Dieter Thomas Kuhn, Lisa Federle and CureVac-Founder Ingmar Hoerr
