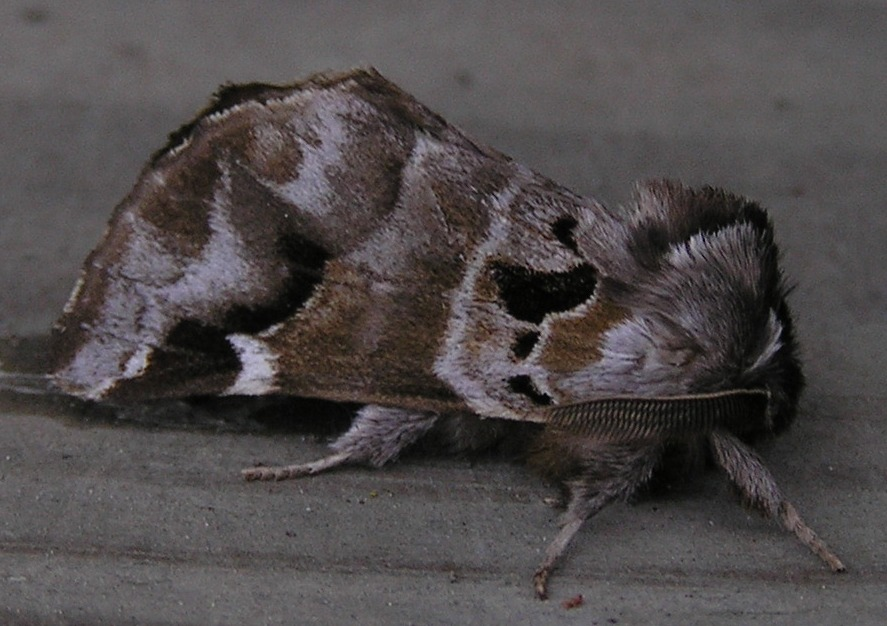

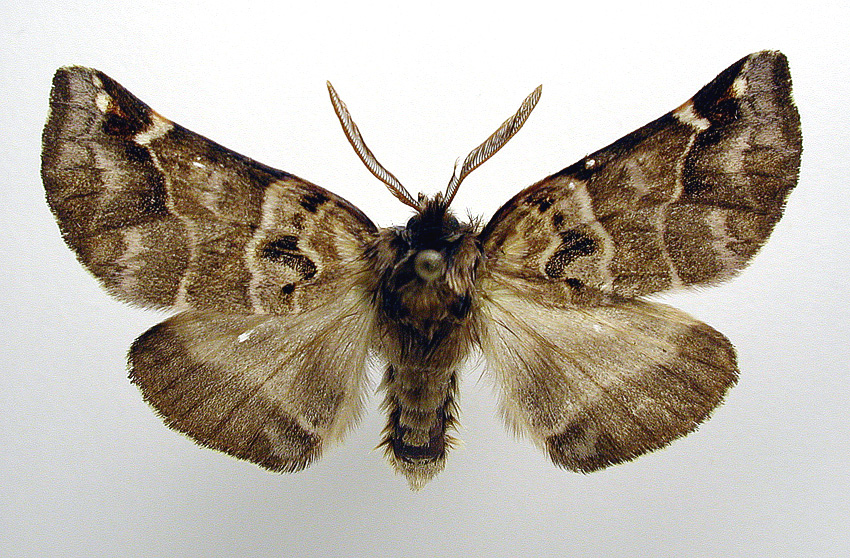

Scientific classification
- Kingdom: Animalia
- Phylum: Arthropoda
- Clade: Pancrustacea
- Class: Insecta
- Order: Lepidoptera
- Superfamily: Noctuoidea
- Family: Notodontidae
- Genus: Pygaera; Ochsenheimer, 1810
- Species: P. timon

Binomial name
- Pygaera timon Hübner, 1803

= Pygaera =

Genus of moths

Pygaera is a monotypic genus of moths in the family Notodontidae erected by Ferdinand Ochsenheimer in 1810. Its only species, Pygaera timon, was first described by Jacob Hübner in 1803. It is found in northern and central Europe, through eastern Asia up to Ussuri and Japan.

The wingspan is 17–19 mm. The moth flies from May to July depending on the location.

The larvae feed on Populus tremula, Populus alba and Populus nigra.

== Former species ==
- Pygaera voeltzkowi Aurivilius, 1909 is now placed in the genus Clostera.
