= Egidius Federle =

German landscape painter and illustrator

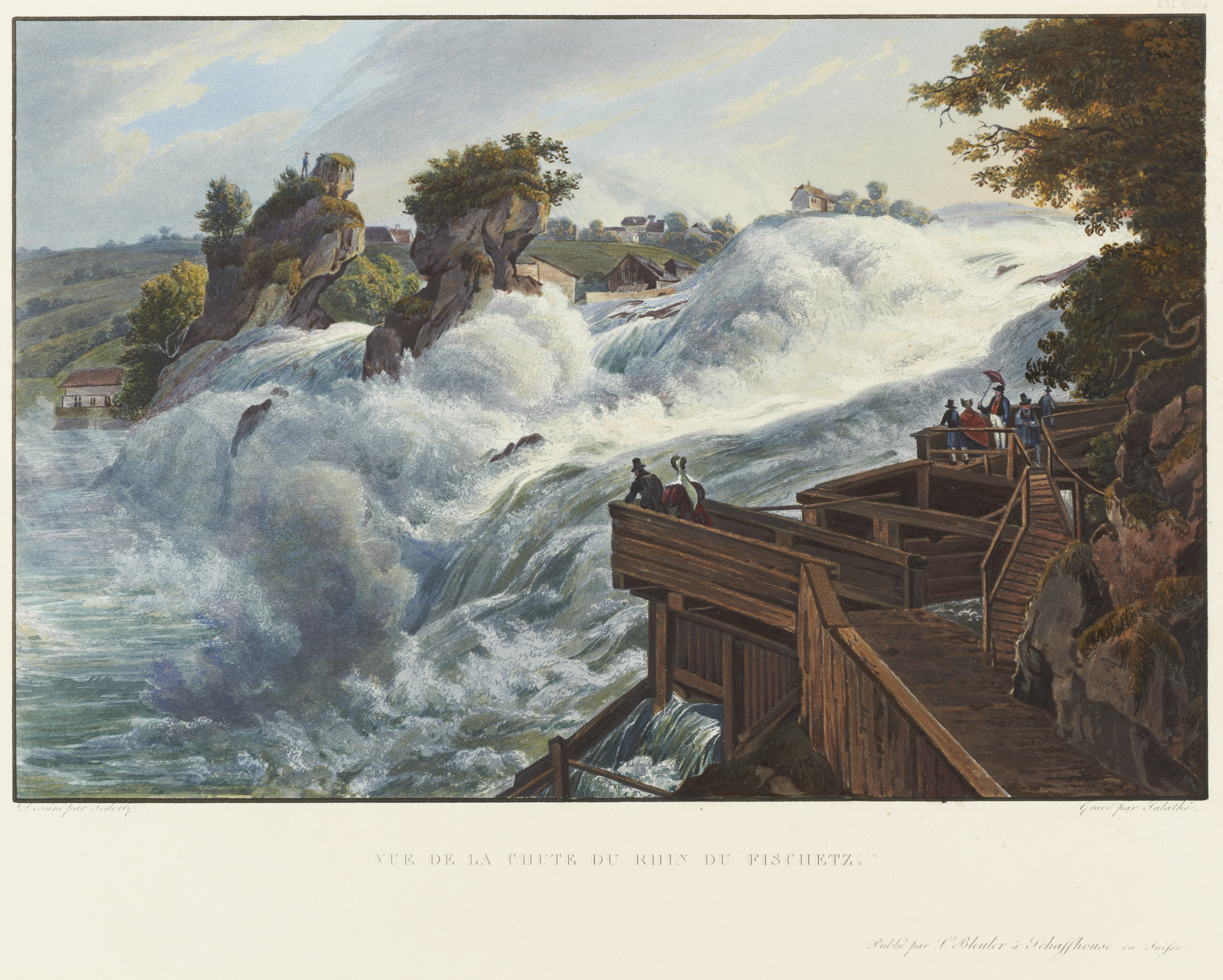
The Rheinfall; engraving by Friedrich Salathé from a watercolor by Federle

Egidius Federle (10 October 1810 – 21 March 1876) was a German landscape painter and illustrator.

== Life and work ==
He was born in Stühlingen. From 1822 to 1823, he served an apprenticeship with the Swiss painter and publisher, Johann Ludwig Bleuler, in Schaffhausen, then finished his apprentice period in 1826 with Bleuler's brother-in-law, Johann Heinrich Uster (1774-1866), in Feuerthalen. After that, he lived with Bleuler and, in 1833, followed him, together with several other painters from Bleuler's school, to Schloss Laufen, above the Rheinfall.

He continued to work for Bleuler's publishing company, specializing in the creation of vedute; contributing illustrations for numerous books. After Bleuler's death in 1850, he moved to Konstanz, where he lived until 1861, when he moved to Freiburg im Breisgau, where he worked as a landscape painter and art teacher.

Among the notable publishing projects he participated in were:

- Malerische Reise von Freiburg im Breisgau durch das Höllenthal und Donaueschingen nach Schaffhausen (Picturesque journey from Freiburg im Breisgau through Höllenthal and Donaueschingen to Schaffhausen) c. 1830;
- Der Rhein von den Quellen bis zur Mündung. (The Rhine from its sources to its mouth) c. 1826. Reissued by Ausgabe Zweibrücken, 1842 and Alexandra Press, Basel 1996, ISBN 3-9521134-0-9.
- Voyage pittoresque des bords du Rhin., Designed by L. Bleuler and Federle; engraved by Hurlimann, Hemely, Salathé and Weber, with explanatory text, liberally translated from the German of Emil Zschokke, by C. F. Girard. Château de Laufen, Bleuler, o. J.; Strasbourg, imprimerie de G. Silbermann, 1845.

Federle died in 1876 in Freiburg im Breisgau.

== Sources ==
- Federle, Aegidius. In: Ulrich Thieme (Ed.): Allgemeines Lexikon der Bildenden Künstler von der Antike bis zur Gegenwart. Vol. 11: Erman–Fiorenzo. E. A. Seemann, Leipzig 1915, pg. 335 Online
- Max Schefold: Alte Ansichten aus Baden, Tafel- und Katalogband. Konrad, Weissenhorn 1971. ISBN 978-3-87437-061-5
- Robert Pfaff: Die Bleuler Malschule auf Schloss Laufen am Rheinfall. 1985. ISBN 978-3-906660-00-4
