= José Abal =

Spanish Paralympic athlete

Medal record

Paralympic athletics

Representing Spain

Paralympic Games
Silver medal – second place	1992 Barcelona	Pentathlon - PW3-4

José Manuel Abal Lores (Note: In this Spanish name, the first or paternal surname is Abal and the second or maternal family name is Lores.) (born 15 July 1961) is a paralympic athlete from Spain competing mainly in category PW3-4 Pentathlon events.

Abal competed in two Paralympics, in 1992 in his home country and then in 1996 in Atlanta. In 1992 he competed in the marathon but failed to finish and then won silver in the pentathlon behind the world record performance of Czechoslovakia's Vojtěch Vašíček. In 1996 he finished well down the field in the pentathlon, finishing ninth overall, finished third in the discus, could only manage fifth in the heat of his 200 m and pulled out of the shot and javelin before the start.
