= Johann Heinrich Bleuler =

Swiss artist

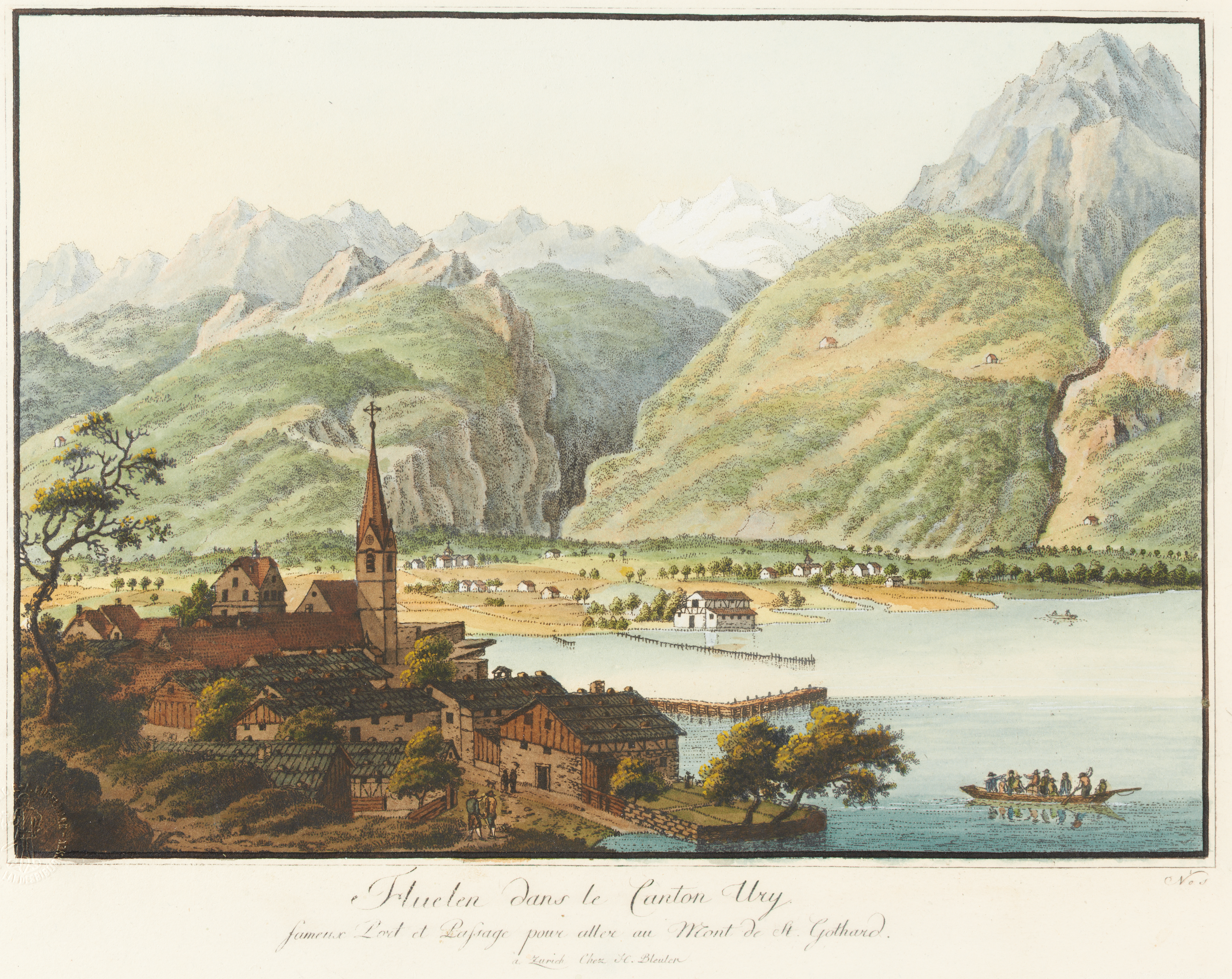
Flüelen in the Canton of Uri, from the Swiss National Library

Johann Heinrich Bleuler, the Elder (31 December 1758 – 25 January 1823) was a Swiss artist who worked with porcelain, landscape sketches and gouache. He was also an art teacher and a publisher of engravings.

== Life ==
He was born in Zollikon and initially trained as a porcelain painter at the Porzellanmanufaktur Kilchberg-Schooren near Zürich. At the beginning of the 1780s, he settled in Feuerthalen and established a dynasty of artists that became known as the "Bleulerische Malschule". Between 1799 and 1804, he worked at Laufen Castle near Schaffhausen, then returned home.

He catered to the popular tastes of the time; often in the style of Ludwig Hess, who had died prematurely. Much of his art involved gouache landscapes and panoramic views of Swiss cities. His watercolors are in the collection of the ETH Zürich. During his final years, he mostly painted flowers.

Bleuler died in 1823 in Feuerthalen.

== The Bleulerische Malschule ==
He had four children. His eldest son, Johann Heinrich Bleuler, the Younger (1787–1857) specialized in painting vedute. His second son, Johann Ludwig, was a landscape painter and art publisher.

He also took two of his godchildren into his home when their parents died; Johann Heinrich Uster (1774–1866), who married Bleuler's daughter Karoline, and Johann Heinrich Wirz (1785–1866). Later, he adopted Anna Bose (1783–1851), who married Wirz and became a gouache painter. Eventually, his family and descendants included twenty-five artists.

== Sources ==
- Johann Heinrich Bleuler der Ältere. In: Ulrich Thieme, Felix Becker (Eds.): Allgemeines Lexikon der Bildenden Künstler von der Antike bis zur Gegenwart. Begründet von Ulrich Thieme und Felix Becker. Vol.4: Bida–Brevoort. Wilhelm Engelmann, Leipzig 1910, pg.115
- Ursula Isler-Hungerbühler: Die Maler vom Schloß Laufen. Kulturgeschichtliche Studie. Rascher, Zürich 1953.
- Robert Pfaff: Die Bleuler Malschule auf Schloss Laufen am Rheinfall. Kuhn-Druck, Neuhausen am Rheinfall 1985, ISBN 3-906660-00-1.
