= Daniel Lede Abal =

German politician (born 1976)

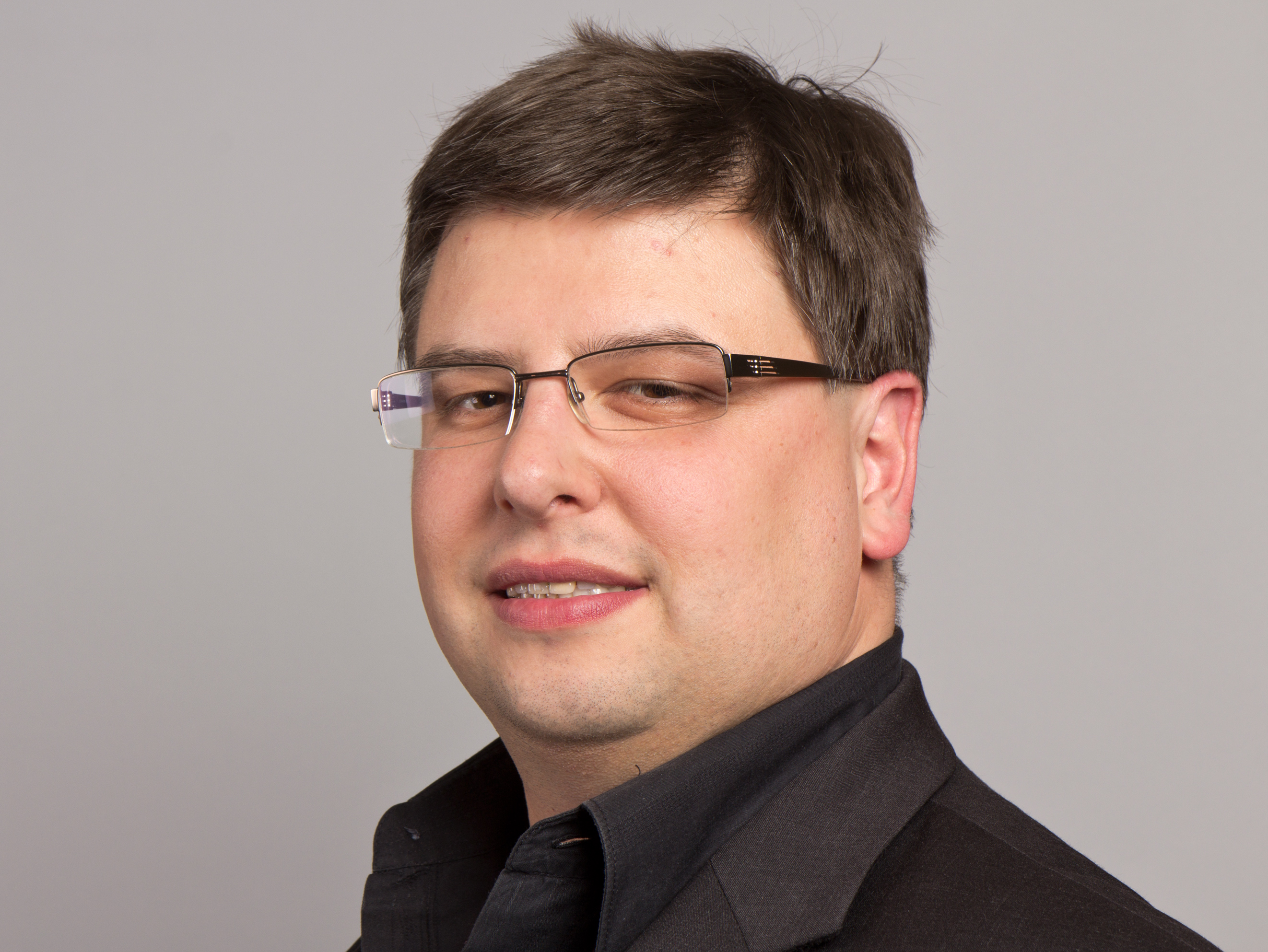
- Lede Abal in 2013

Member of the Landtag of Baden-Württemberg
- Incumbent
- Assumed office 1 May 2011
- Preceded by: Monika Bormann
- Constituency: Tübingen

Personal details
- Born: 1 June 1976 (age 49) Stuttgart
- Party: Alliance 90/The Greens (since 1998)

Daniel Andreas Lede Abal (born 1 June 1976 in Stuttgart) is a German politician serving as a member of the Landtag of Baden-Württemberg since 2011. He has served as chief whip of Alliance 90/The Greens since 2022.
