= Johann Ludwig Bleuler =

Swiss artist (1792–1850)

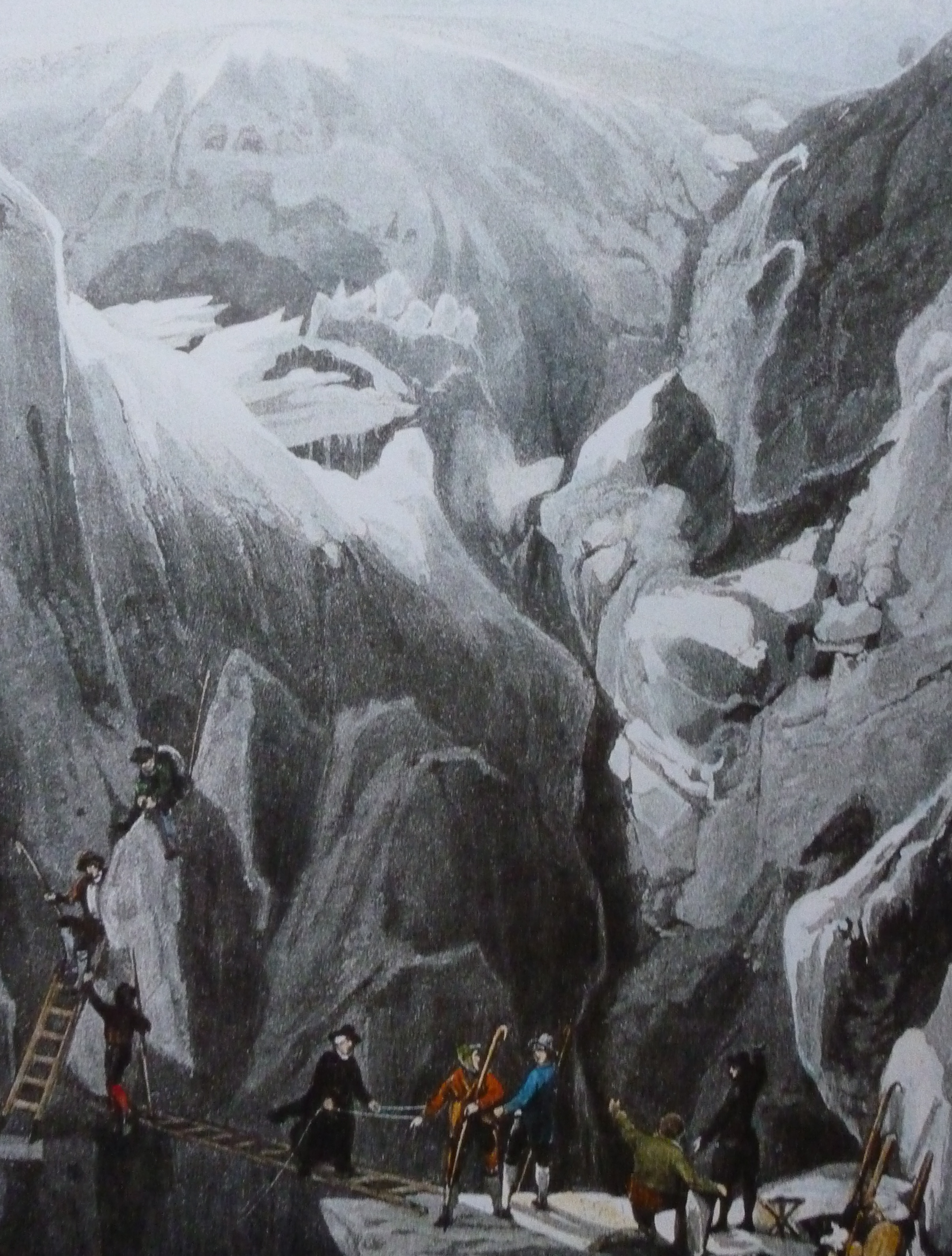
Placidus a Spescha crossing the pass near the Rheinwaldhorn glacier (1818)

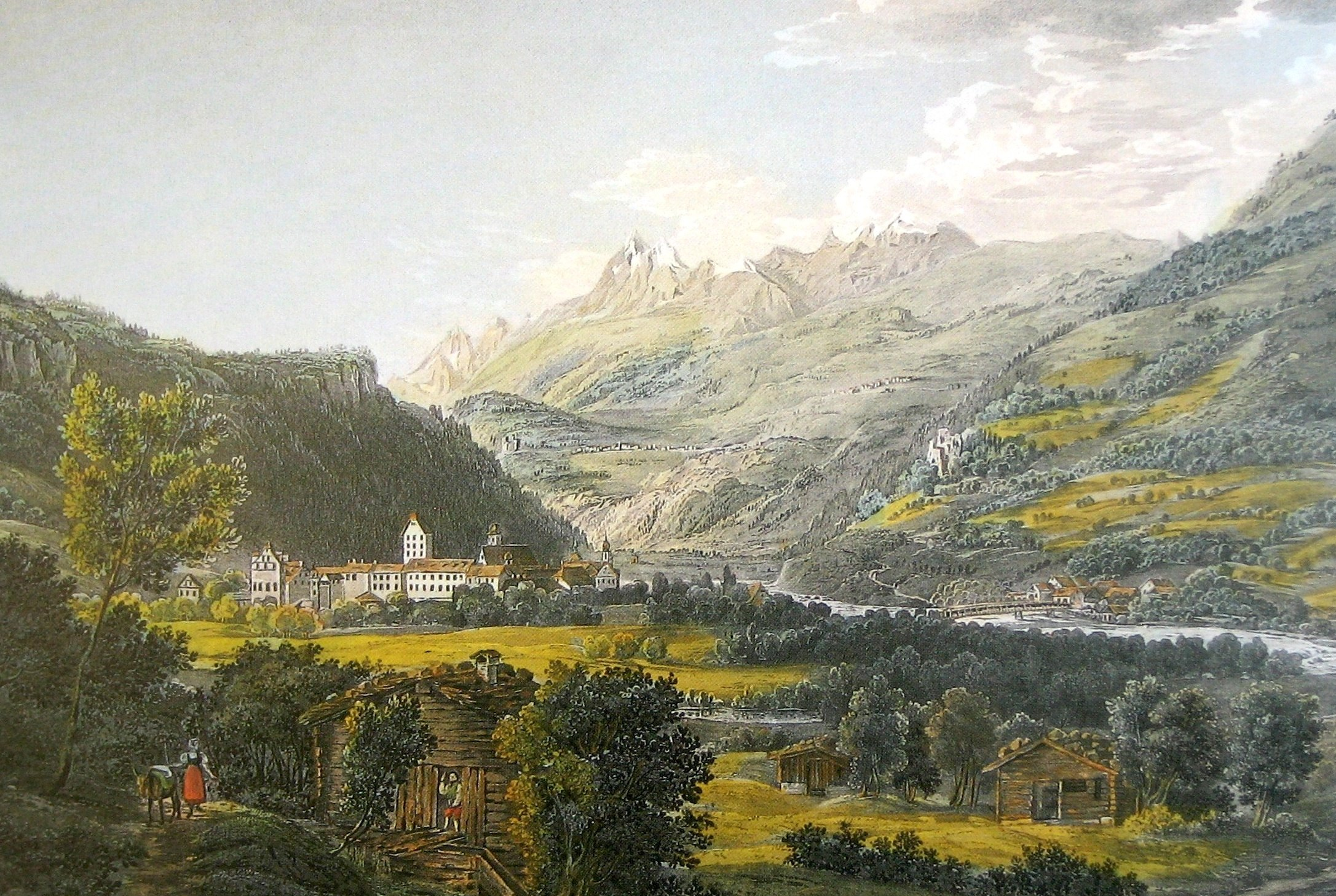
View of Ilanz on the Vorderrhein (1818)

Johann Ludwig Bleuler, sometimes called Louis (12 February 1792 – 28 March 1850) was a Swiss painter, landscape artist, and publisher.

== Biography ==
Bleuler was born in Feuerthalen. His father, Johann Heinrich, was a landscape painter and member of the Schweizer Kleinmeister (lesser masters). His older brother, Johann Heinrich, the Younger (1787–1857) also became a painter. He began his artistic training in his father's workshop, where he learned painting and draftsmanship.

From 1817 to 1818, he travelled throughout the Rhine region, making landscape sketches and studies. The following year, he participated in an exhibition at the Künstlergesellschaft (an artists' association) in Zürich. That same year, he made a combination study and business trip to Brussels and Amsterdam. During a subsequent stay in Paris, he met his future wife, Antoinette Trillié. Back in Feuerthalen, he and his older brother took over management of their father's business.

In 1824, he started his own publishing company in Schaffhausen. Beginning in 1827, he worked on a sequence of prints featuring landscapes and vedute along the Rhein; a project that would occupy him until his death. His major work, Voyage pittoresque aux bords du Rhin et de la Suisse was published in 1845. The aquatints were all colored by hand, using gouache techniques that gave them the appearance of Old Masters.

In 1833, he had moved his home and fast growing business to Schloss Laufen near the Rheinfall. Many well known, or soon to be well known, artists were employed by his shop, including Egidius Federle, Konrad Corradi and Emanuel Labhardt.

In 1838, he made a business trip to St. Petersburg. While there, he contracted a serious illness that left him in poor health. In the following years, his company was nearly ruined, through a combination of new printing techniques and the Revolutions of 1848. He died on 28 March 1850 in Laufen-Uhwiesen.

== Sources ==
- Bleuler, Joh. Ludwig. In: Ulrich Thieme, Felix Becker (Eds.): Allgemeines Lexikon der Bildenden Künstler von der Antike bis zur Gegenwart. Vol.4: Bida–Brevoort. Wilhelm Engelmann, Leipzig 1910, pg.115 *
- Johann Ludwig Bleuler: Der Rhein von den Quellen bis zur Mündung. Alexandra Press, Basel 1996, ISBN 3-9521134-0-9.
- Barbara Kemmer: Kunstsinn und Geschäftskalkül. Der Rheinfall in den Landschaftsveduten der Bleuler Malschule. In: Claudia Heitmann (Hrsg.): Der Rheinfall. Erhabene Natur und touristische Vermarktung. Ausst.-Kat. Mittelrhein-Museum Koblenz, Regensburg 2015, S. 55–62.
