= Noël Paymal Lerebours =

Noël Marie Paymal Lerebours
- Born: February 16, 1807; Paris
- Died: July 23, 1873 (aged 66); Neuilly-sur-Seine
- Occupation: optician
- Known for: daguerreotypist
- Notable work: Excursions Daguerriennes

Noël Marie Paymal Lerebours (16 February 1807 – 23 July 1873) was a French optician and daguerreotypist. He is best known today for his Excursions Daguerriennes, books of views of the world's monuments, based on early photographs redrawn by hand as Aquatint engravings.

== Early life ==
Lerebours was born in Paris of an unknown father. His mother, Marie Jeanne Françoise Paymal, a seamstress from Vitry-sur-Marne, worked in Rue Froidmanteau, Tuileries, Paris. She married Jean Lerebours, an optician, who adopted the child on 11 June 1836. On the death of his adoptive father, Lerebours took over the optician's shop in the Place du Pont-Neuf and formed a partnership with Marc Secretan in 1845, the firm being known as Lerebours et Secretan. As well as producing high quality lenses and glasses for astronomical observatories, during the years 1840-1850 Lerebours was equally interested in improving daguerreotype photography.

== Career ==
In the autumn of 1839, Lerebours used his skill in optics to manufacture and sell a sliding box whole-plate camera, copied from the instruction manual for Daguerre's pioneering instrument.

Lerebours noted in 1842 that in just two months he had taken 1500 portraits. Among these were daguerreotypes of the King, Louis-Philippe of France and Queen Amélie, in June or July 1842. Lerebours and Antoine Claudet took the royal portraits at a distance of 2 metres using daylight from the large windows of the Tuileries palace. The exposure time was 85 seconds using 1/4 plate double lens cameras.

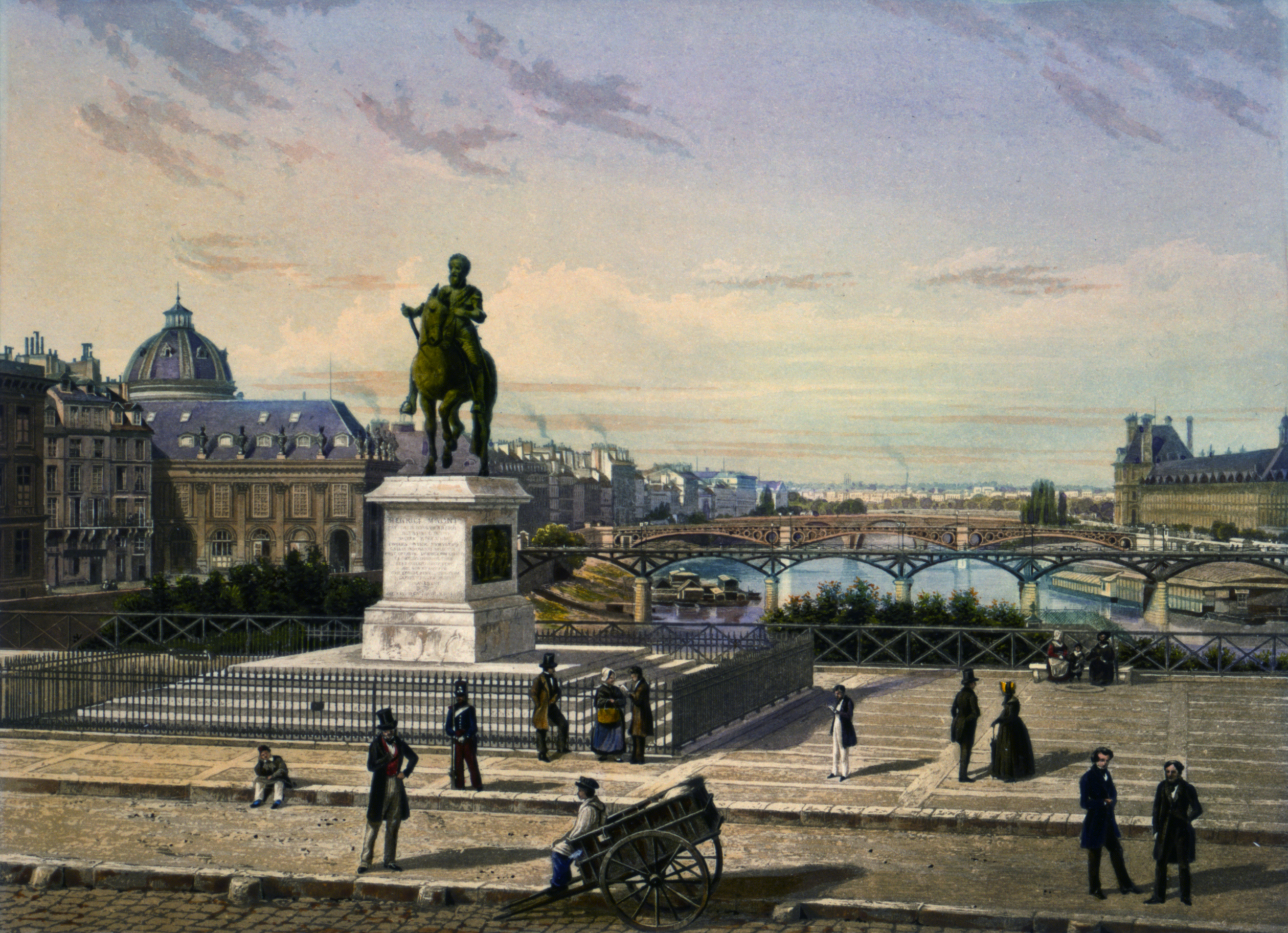
Aquatint engraving "View from the Pont Neuf, Paris" from Lerebours' Excursions Daguerriennes

He took an early astronomy photograph, of the sun, in that year, 1842, but the plate revealed little detail due to overexposure (solarisation). His colleague Hippolyte Fizeau, working with the physicist Jean Bernard Léon Foucault made the first plate showing sunspots in 1844. His studio soon became a major meeting place and centre of innovation in daguerreotype photography. He worked with Fizeau and Marc Antoine Gaudin, with whom he claimed he could make images in a tenth of a second, which was exceptional for that time. The first plate photographs were tried out using Fizeau's sensitization methods. In his workshop there were panoramic daguerreotypes of the river Seine, preserved today in the Carnavalet Museum.

Lerebours is known for his Excursions Daguerriennes, books of views of the world's monuments, based on early photographs, produced in Paris in a number of subscription volumes between 1841 at the dawn of photography and 1864. Some of the photographs, of the Niagara Falls as well as of Rome and Paris, were taken by the English industrial chemist Hugh Lee Pattinson. These were then transferred to engravings to illustrate Lerebours' Excursions Daguerriennes (Paris, 1841–1864). However, the manual process of translating the photographs to aquatint engravings took away the immediacy of the real daguerreotypes, whatever the gains in quality.

In 1851, Lerebours was one of the founders of the first photographic society, the Société Héliographique.

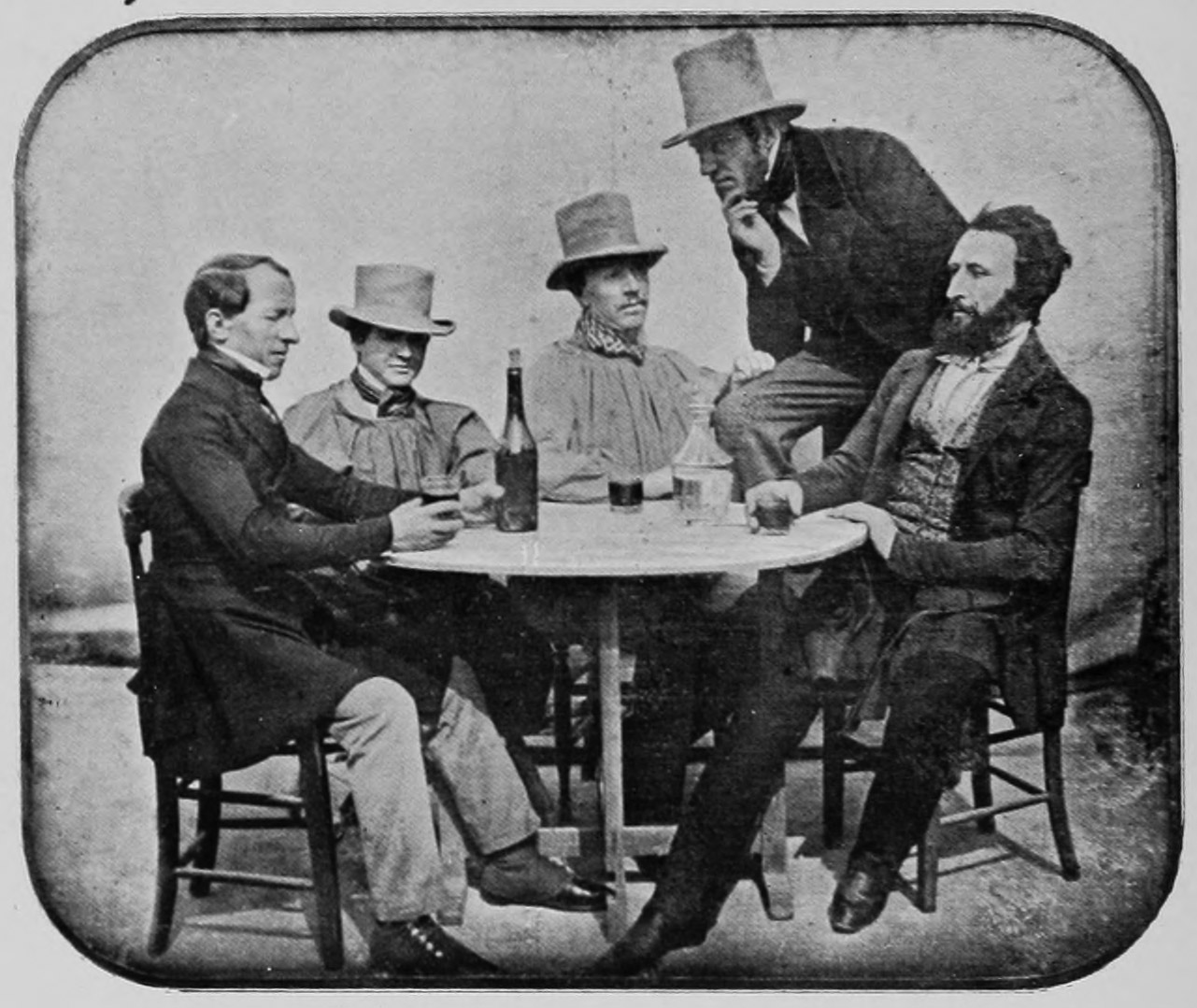
1844 daguerreotype of Lerebours (on left), with Frederic Martens (standing), inventor of panoramic camera, and Antoine Gaudin (on right)

Lerebours retired in 1855. He died in Neuilly-sur-Seine.

== Museums and galleries ==
- Metropolitan Museum of Art (3 works)
- Getty Museum (2 works)
- Musée d'Orsay (in exhibition, 2006)

== Works ==
Lerebours published the following books (in French, with English translations as indicated).

- Description des microscopes achromatiques simplifiés (1839)
- Excursions daguerriennes : vues et monuments les plus remarquables du globe (2 volumes, 1840–1844)
- Derniers perfectionnements apportés au daguerréotype, with Marc Antoine Gaudin (1841)
- Traité de photographie, derniers perfectionnements apportés au daguerréotype (4th edition, 1843)

--- A treatise on photography (English translation)

- Instruction pratique sur les microscopes, contenant la description des microscopes achromatiques simplifés (3rd édition, 1846)
- De l'Emploi des lunettes pour la conservation de la vue (1861)

== Excursions daguerriennes ==
Aquatints based on daguerreotypes published by Lerebours in his Excursions daguerriennes in 1842.

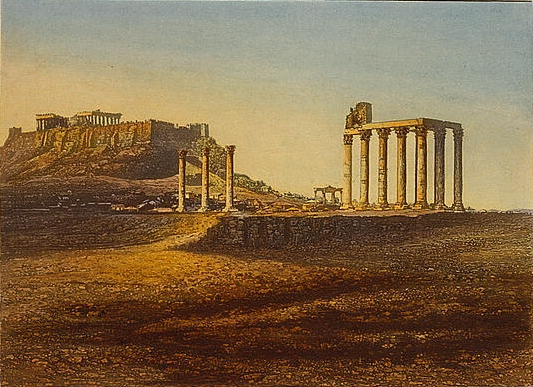
The Acropolis, Athens

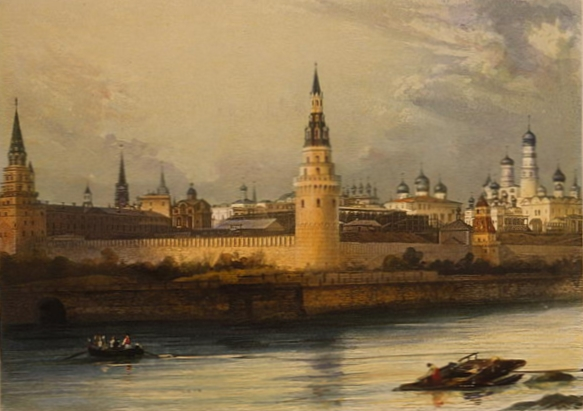
The Kremlin, Moscow

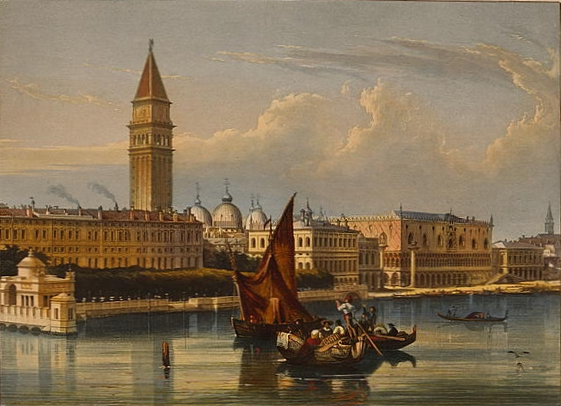
Entrance to the Grand Canal, Venice

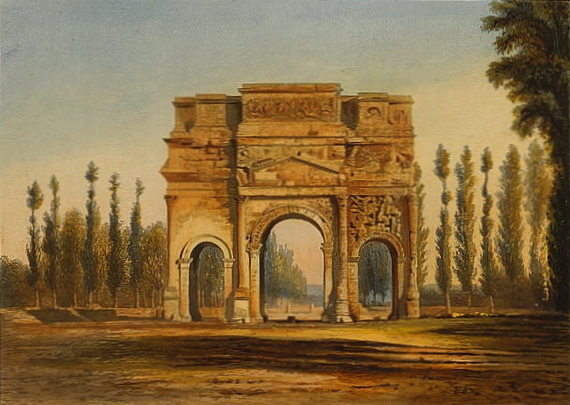
The Triumphal Arch of Orange

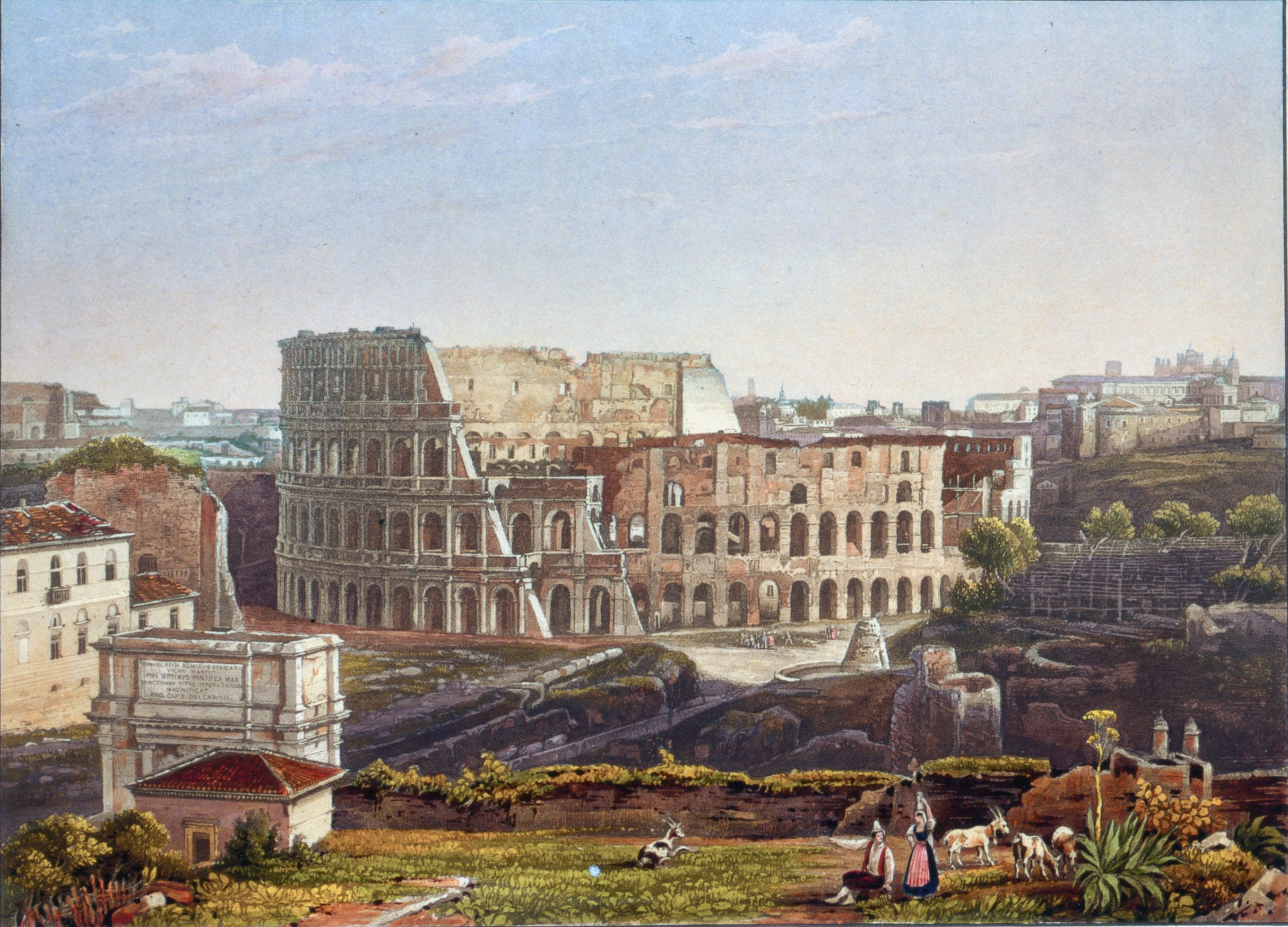
The Coliseum, Rome
