= List of lakes of Quebec =

This is an incomplete list of lakes of Quebec, a province of Canada.

== Larger lake statistics ==

This is a list of lakes of Quebec with an area larger than 400 km^{2} (150 sq mi).

Quebec lakes larger than 400 km^{2} (150 sq mi)
Lake	Area (including islands)	Altitude	Depth max.	Volume
Caniapiscau Reservoir	4,318 km^{2} (1,667 sq mi)	535 m (1,755 ft)	49 m (161 ft)	53.8 km^{3} (12.9 cu mi)
Robert-Bourassa Reservoir	2,815 km^{2} (1,087 sq mi)	175 m (574 ft)	137 m (449 ft)	61.7 km^{3} (14.8 cu mi)
La Grande-3 Reservoir	2,420 km^{2} (930 sq mi)	256 m (840 ft)		
Lac Mistassini	2,335 km^{2} (902 sq mi)	372 m (1,220 ft)		
Manicouagan Reservoir	1,973 km^{2} (762 sq mi)	360 m (1,180 ft)	350 m (1,150 ft)	139.8 km^{3} (33.5 cu mi)
Gouin Reservoir	1,570 km^{2} (610 sq mi)	404 m (1,325 ft)		
Lac a l'Eau-Claire	1,383 km^{2} (534 sq mi)	241 m (791 ft)	178 m (584 ft)	
Laforge-1 Reservoir	1,288 km^{2} (497 sq mi)			
Lake Champlain	1,269 km^{2} (490 sq mi)			
Lac Bienville	1,249 km^{2} (482 sq mi)	426 m (1,398 ft)		
Lac Saint-Jean	1,053 km^{2} (407 sq mi)	99 m (325 ft)	63.1 m (207 ft)	11.9 km^{3} (2.9 cu mi)
Opinaca Reservoir	1,040 km^{2} (400 sq mi)	216 m (709 ft)		
Pipmuacan Reservoir	978 km^{2} (378 sq mi)	396 m (1,299 ft)		13.9 km^{3} (3.3 cu mi)
Lake Abitibi	931 km^{2} (359 sq mi)			
La Grande-4 Reservoir	765 km^{2} (295 sq mi)	377 m (1,237 ft)		
Lake Minto	761 km^{2} (294 sq mi)	168 m (551 ft)		
Lac Guillaume-Delisle	712 km^{2} (275 sq mi)			
Cabonga Reservoir	677 km^{2} (261 sq mi)	361 m (1,184 ft)		
Outardes-4 Reservoir	625 km^{2} (241 sq mi)			24.3 km^{3} (5.8 cu mi)
Eastmain Reservoir	533 km^{2} (206 sq mi)	130 m (430 ft)		
Lake Manouane	584 km^{2} (225 sq mi)	494 m (1,621 ft)		
Lacs des Loups Marins	576 km^{2} (222 sq mi)	262 m (860 ft)		
Lake Evans	547 km^{2} (211 sq mi)	232 m (761 ft)		
Lac Sakami	533 km^{2} (206 sq mi)	186 m (610 ft)		
Lac Payne	533 km^{2} (206 sq mi)	130 m (430 ft)		
Lac aux Feuilles	470 km^{2} (180 sq mi)	tidal		
Lac Albanel	444 km^{2} (171 sq mi)	389 m (1,276 ft)		
Baskatong Reservoir	413 km^{2} (159 sq mi)	223 m (732 ft)	96 m (315 ft)	
Dozois Reservoir	405 km^{2} (156 sq mi)	389 m (1,276 ft)		

== 0–9 ==
- Lake 3.1416

== A ==
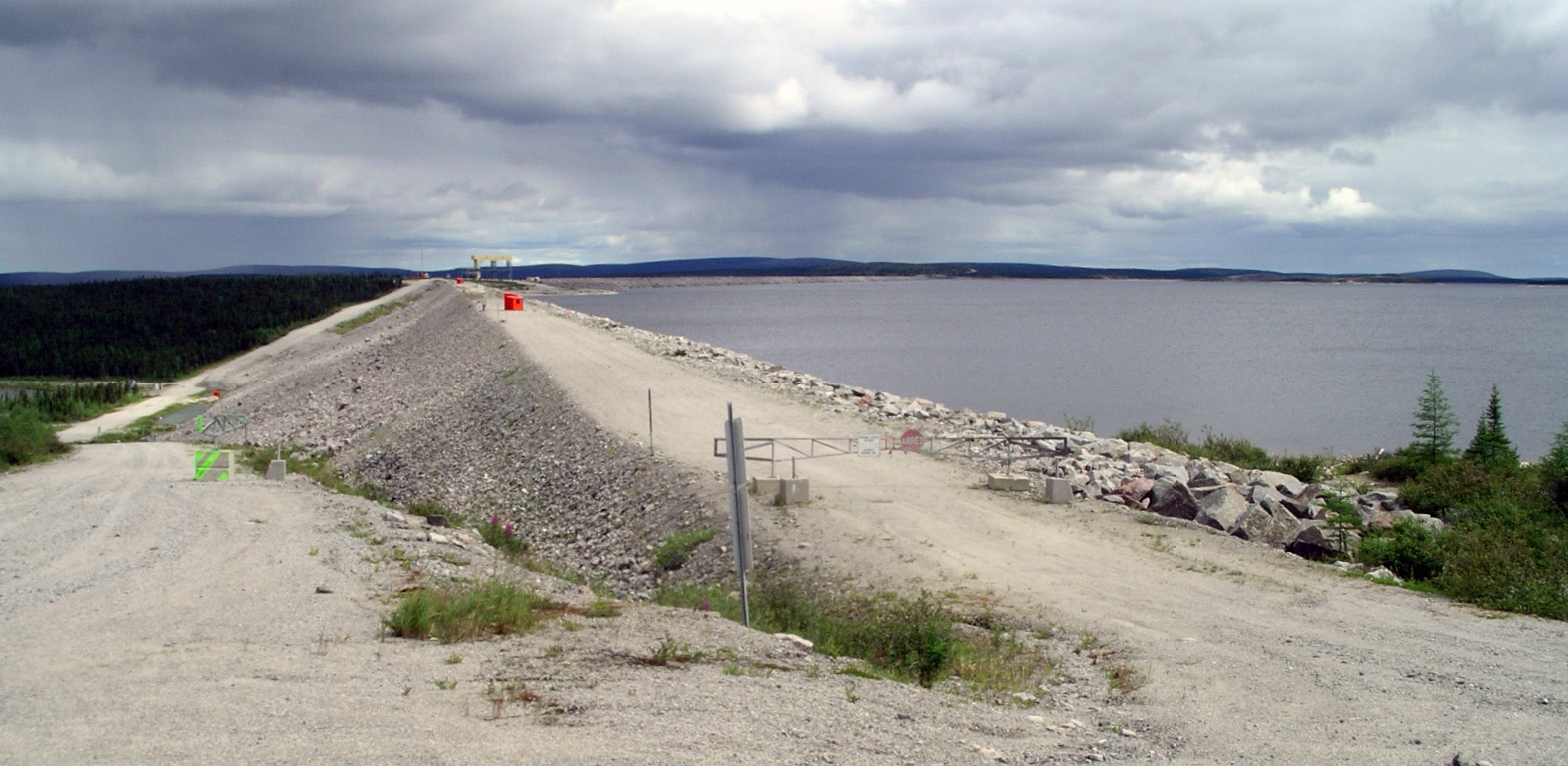
Caniapiscau Reservoir

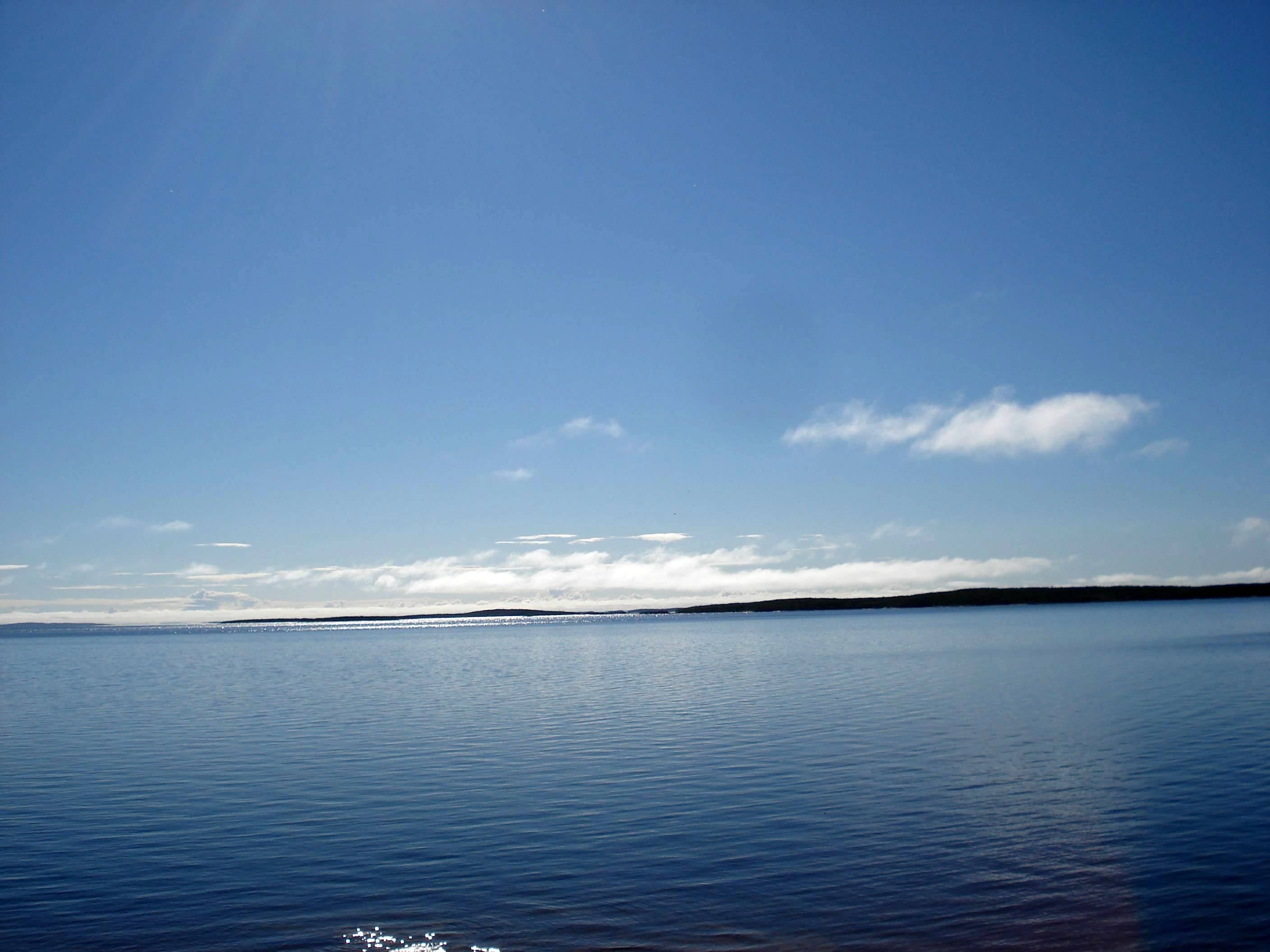
Robert-Bourassa Reservoir

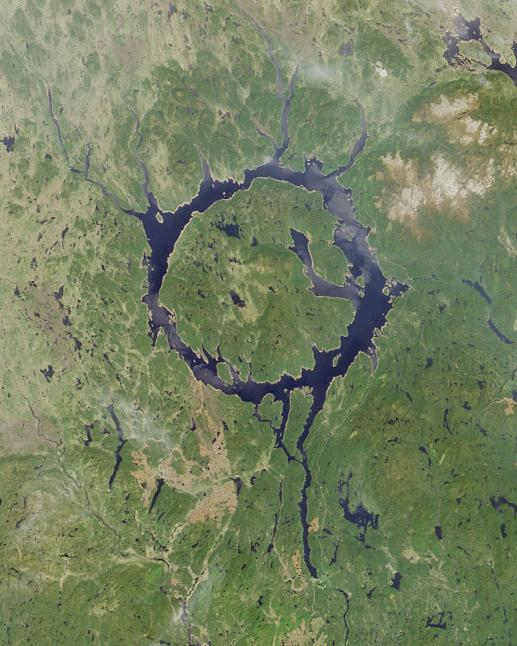
Manicouagan Reservoir

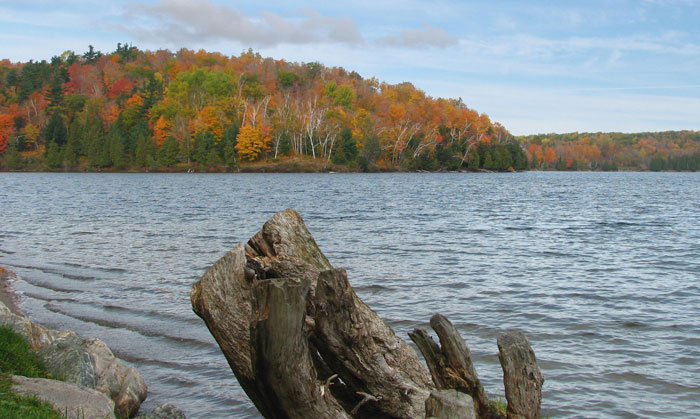
Meech Lake from Blanchet beach by south-west coast

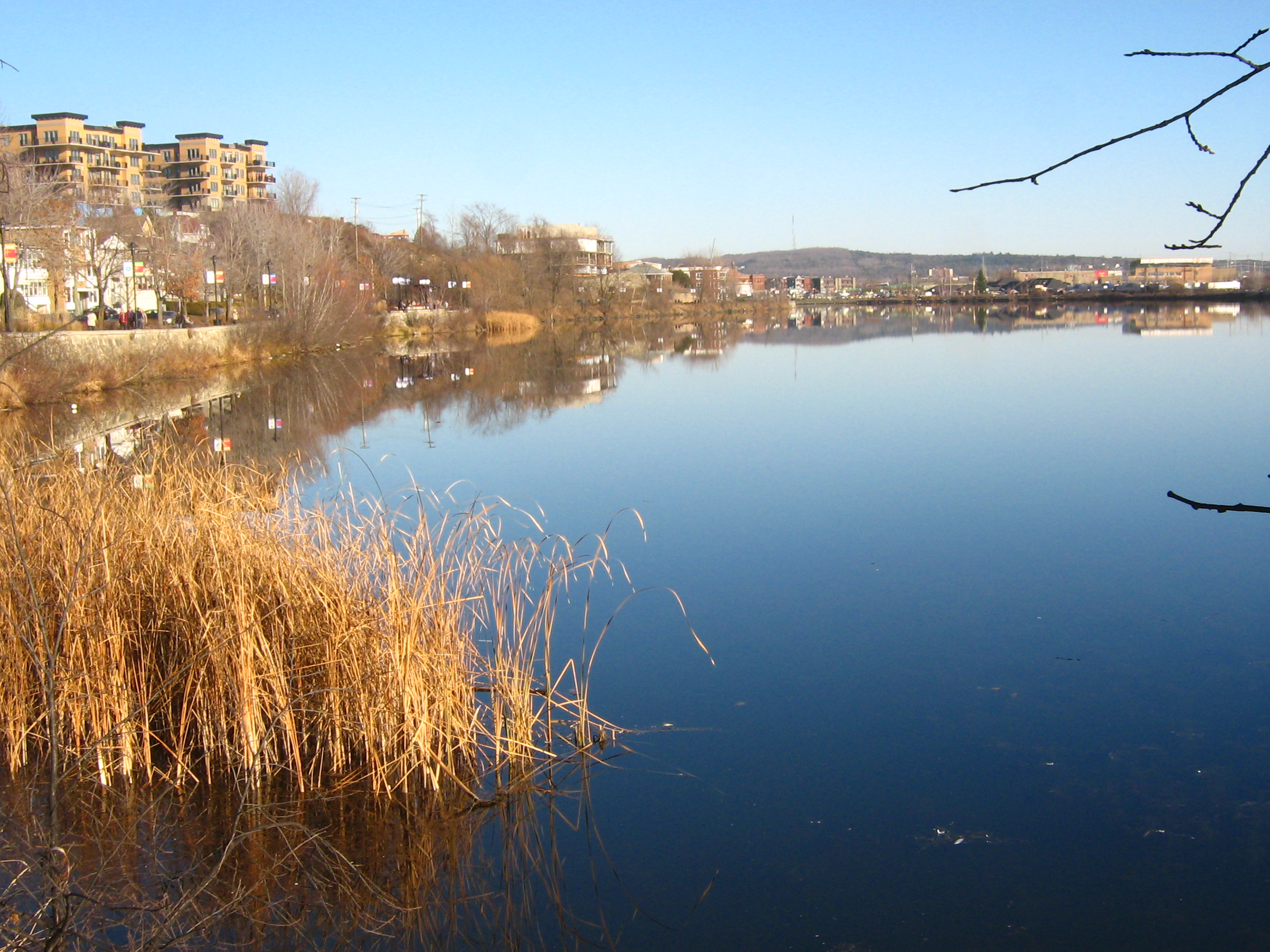
Lac des Nations

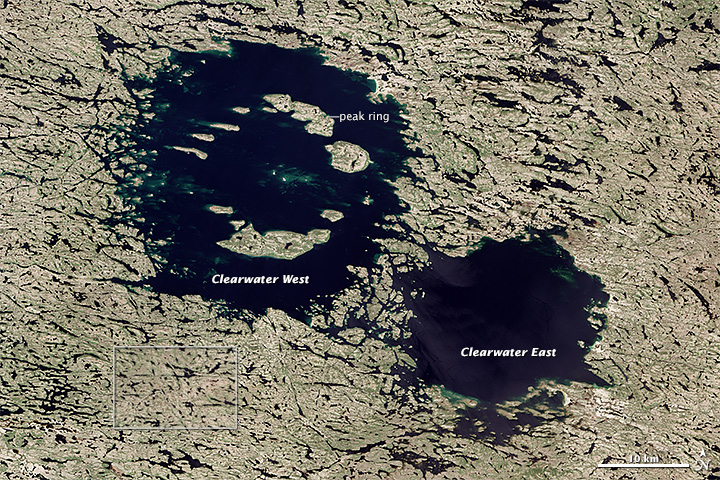
Clearwater Lakes (Lac a l'Eau-Claire)

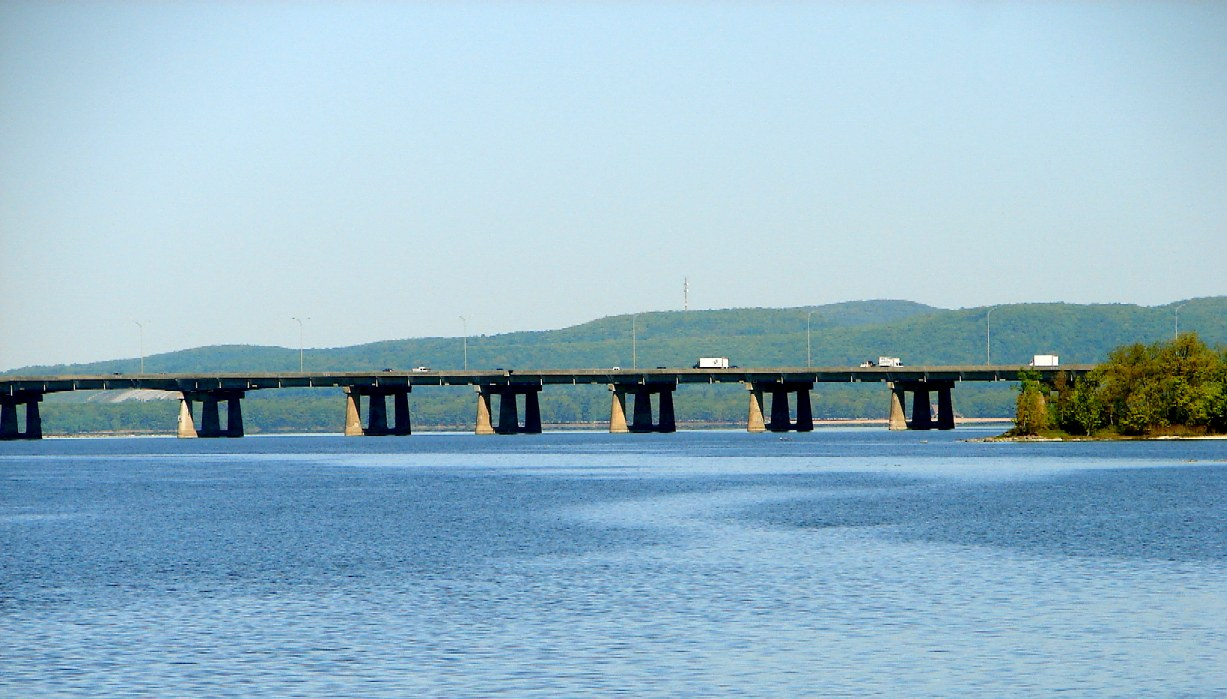
Île aux Tourtes Bridge across Lake of Two Mountains, with Mont Oka in the background

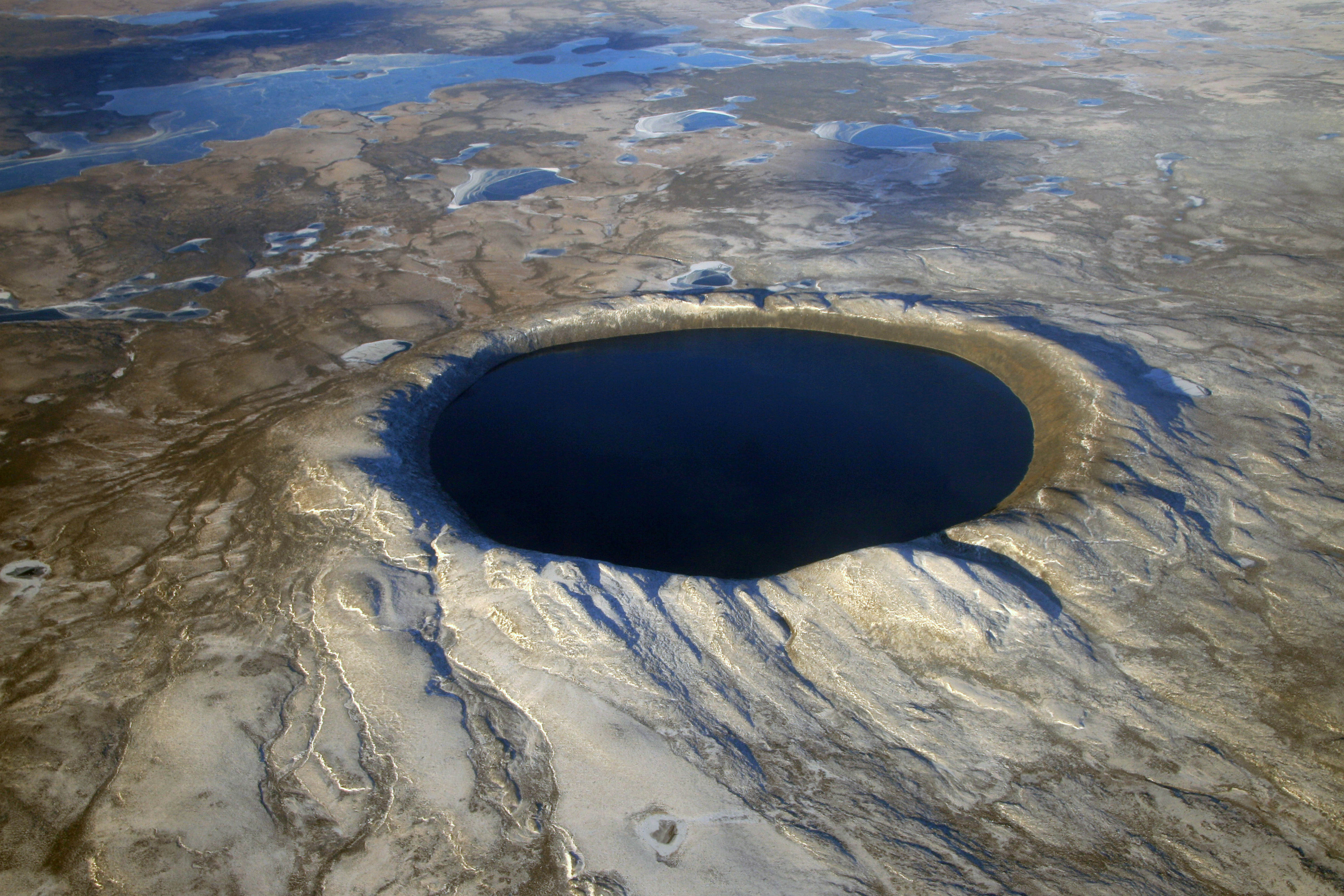
Pingualuit crater lake

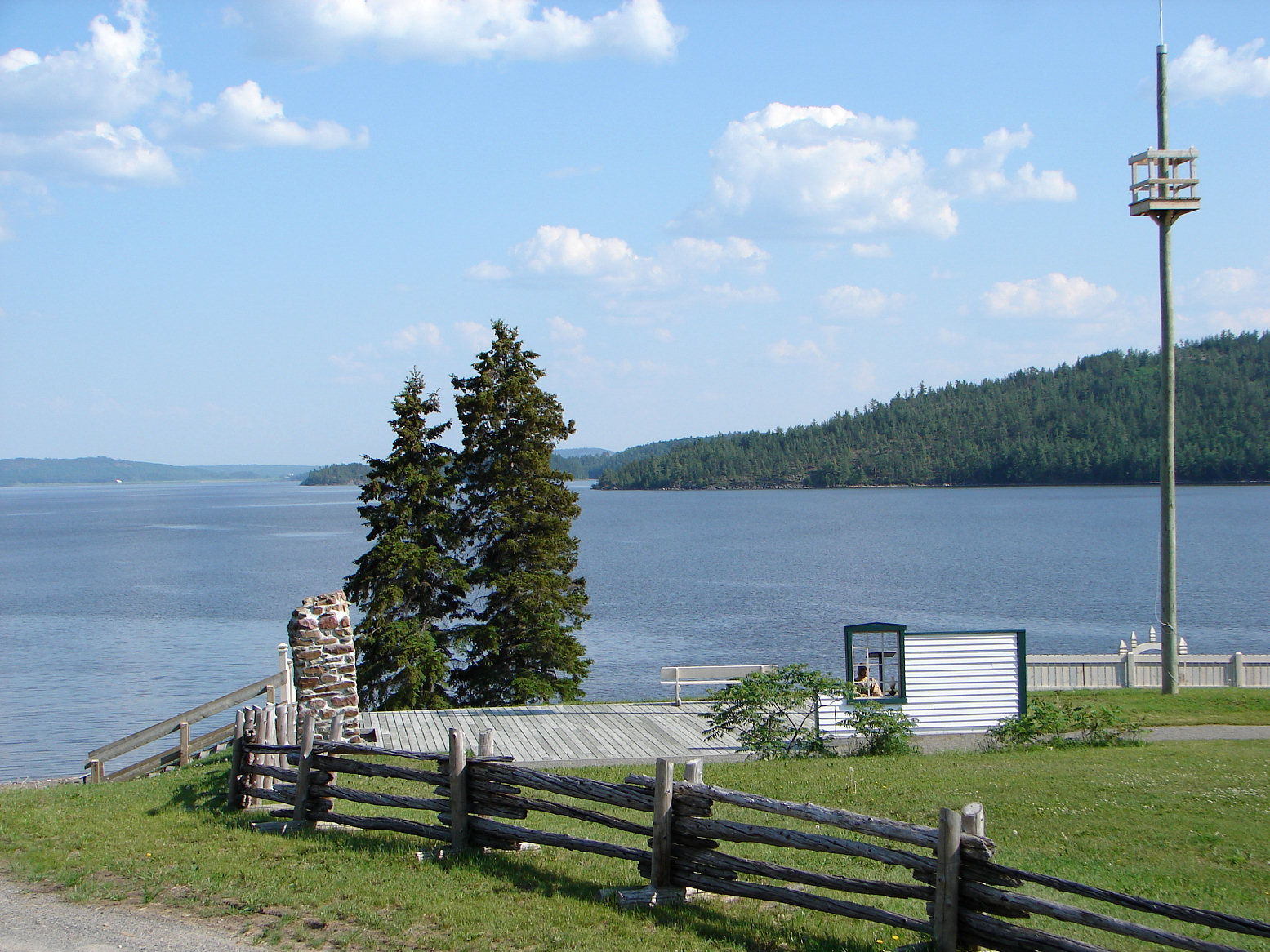
Looking south over Lake Timiskaming from Fort Témiscamingue near Ville-Marie, Quebec.

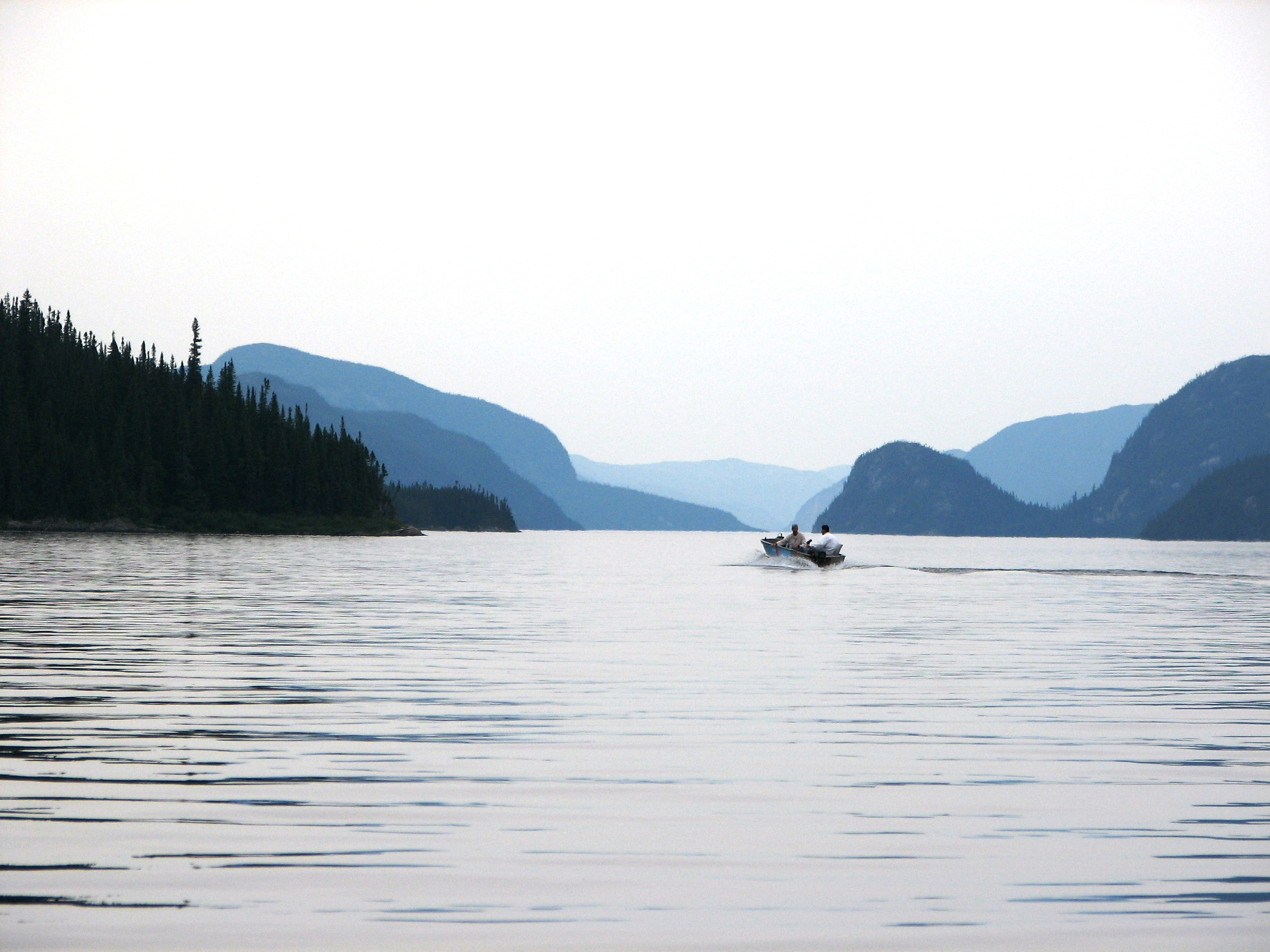
Lac Walker

- Lake Abitibi in Ontario and Quebec
- Lake Albanel
- Allioux Lake
- Archange Lake (Mékinac)
- Lake Arpin
- Lake Aylmer

== B ==
- Baskatong Reservoir
- Batiscan Lake, Quebec
- Lac Beauchamp
- Lake Bermen
- Lake Bienville
- Lac aux Biscuits
- Reservoir Blanc
- Lac La Blanche
- Lake Blouin
- Blue Sea Lake
- Lac Boivin
- Boyd Lake (Quebec)
- Brome Lake
- Lake Brompton
- Burnt Lake (Canada)
- Lake Burton (Quebec)

== C ==
- Cabonga Reservoir
- Lac Cabot
- Caniapiscau Reservoir
- Causapscal Lake
- Clearwater Lakes or Lac a l'Eau-Claire
- Lake Champlain in Quebec and New York, Vermont
- Lake Charest (Mékinac)
- Châteauvert Lake (La Tuque)
- Lac des Chats
- Cinconsine Lake
- Lac des Chicots (Sainte-Thècle)
- Croche Lake (Sainte-Thècle)
- Lake of the Cross (Lac-Édouard)

== D ==
- Du Pretre
- Du Cardinal
- Lake Dana
- Lac Deschênes
- Dozois Reservoir
- Lac Dumoine
- Duncan Lake (Quebec)

== E ==
- Eastmain Reservoir
- Lake Édouard (Quebec)
- Lake Evans (Quebec)

== F ==
- Lake Fontaine (Mékinac)
- Lac du Fou (Mékinac)

== G ==
- Gouin Reservoir
- Lac Grand, Quebec
- Grand Lake Bostonnais
- Grand Lac Nominingue
- Lake Guindon
- Lac Guillaume-Delisle

== H ==
- Lake Hackett (Mékinac)
- Harrington Lake

== J ==
- Jacqueline Lake
- Lake Jesuit
- Lake Juillet
- Julian Lake

== K ==
- Lake Kapibouska
- Kempt Lake (Matawinie)
- Kenogami Lake
- Lake Kipawa
- Lake Kiskissink

== L ==
- La Pêche Lake
- Lac à la Perdrix
- Lac des Écorces (Antoine-Labelle)
- Lac La Blanche
- Lac Lancre
- Little Cedar Lake
- Leamy Lake
- Lake Lescarbot
- Lake Louisa
- Lacs des Loups Marins
- Lake Lovering
- Low Lake

== M ==
- Lake Magog
- Manicouagan Reservoir
- Petit lac Manicouagan
- Lake Manouane
- Lake Masketsi (Mékinac)
- Lake Massawippi
- Lake Matagami
- Lake Matapedia
- Lac McArthur
- McTavish reservoir
- Meech Lake
- Mékinac Lake
- Lake Mégantic
- Lake Memphremagog
- Lake Minto
- Missionary Lake
- Lake Mistassini
- Mondonac Lake
- Montauban Lake (Portneuf)
- Musquaro Lake

== N ==
- Lake Naococane
- Lac des Nations
- Lake Nedlouc
- Lake Nemiscau
- Petit Lac Nominingue

== O ==
- Lake Olga
- Opiscoteo Lake
- Osisko Lake
- Lake Ouareau

== P ==
- Lac Paradis
- Lake Péribonca
- Lake Pierre-Paul (Mékinac)
- Pink Lake
- Lac des Pins, Aumond, Quebec
- Pingualuit crater lake
- Pipmuacan Reservoir
- Lac Phillipe
- Lake Plétipi
- Lake Pohenegamook
- Lake Poncheville

== R ==
- Lake Roberge (Grandes-Piles)
- Lake Roberge (Lac-Masketsi)
- Robert-Bourassa Reservoir
- Roggan Lake

== S ==
- Lake Saint François (Estrie)
- Lake Saint Francis (Canada)
- Lake Saint-Charles
- Lake Saint-Jean
- Lake Saint-Louis
- Petit Lac Saint-François
- Lake Saint Pierre
- Lac au Saumon
- Lac Sauvage (Mont-Blanc)
- Lac-des-Seize-Îles, or "Sixteen Islands Lake"
- Lac Simard (Temiscamingue)
- Selby Lake
- Simard Lake (Gouin Reservoir)
- Simard Lake (Petit-Mécatina)
- Soscumica Lake
- Lake Stukely

== T ==
- Taureau Reservoir
- Taylor Lake (Quebec)
- Lake Témiscouata
- Lake Terrien (Mékinac)
- Lake Timiskaming in Ontario and Quebec
- Lake Tourouvre
- Lake Traverse (Mékinac)
- Lake Tremblant
- Lake Trenche (Lac-Ashuapmushuan)
- Lake Troilus
- Lake of Two Mountains

== V ==
- Lake Ventadour (La Tuque)
- Lake Verneuil
- Lake Vlimeux (Mékinac)

== W ==
- Lake Wabano
- Lake Wakuach
- Lake Walker
- Wapizagonke Lake
- Lake Waswanipi
- Lake Wayagamac
- Lake Wickenden

== Y ==
- Lake Yasinski

== See also ==
- List of rivers of Quebec
- Geography of Quebec
