= Lac Sakami =

Reservoir in Quebec, Canada

- Location in Quebec
- Location: Nord-du-Québec, Quebec
- Coordinates: 53°15′07″N 76°45′41″W
- Primary outflows: Sakami River, Eastmain River
- Basin countries: Canada
- Surface area: 738 km^{2} (285 sq mi)
- Average depth: 113 m (371 ft)
- Surface elevation: 186 m (610 ft)

Lac Sakami is a lake in the northwest of the province of Quebec in Canada. It is located east of James Bay, south of the Robert-Bourassa Reservoir and north of the Opinaca Reservoir.

Lac Sakami is now a reservoir of the James Bay Project with a depth of 113 m (371 ft), an elevation of 186 m (610 ft) and an area of 738 km^{2} (285 sq mi). Prior to being used as a reservoir it had an area of 533 km^{2} (206 sq mi). The Cree called the lake Mesackamee.

== See also ==
- List of lakes of Quebec
