= Wabano =

Wabano may refer to:

- Lake Wabano, La Tuque, Quebec, Canada
- Wabano River, La Tuque, Quebec, Canada
