= Eastmain River =

Eastmain
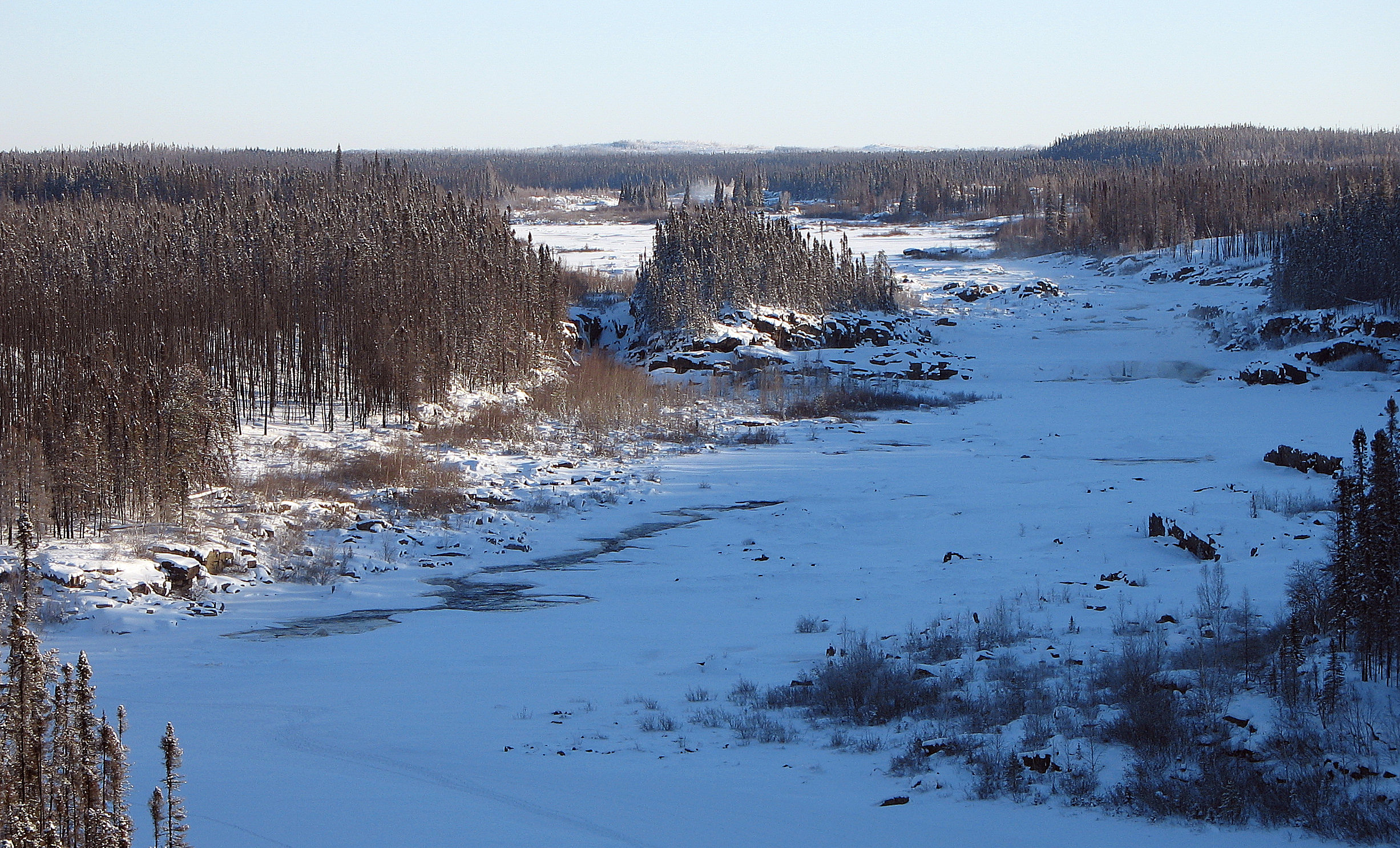
- Eastmain River in Dec. 2005 at the James Bay Road.

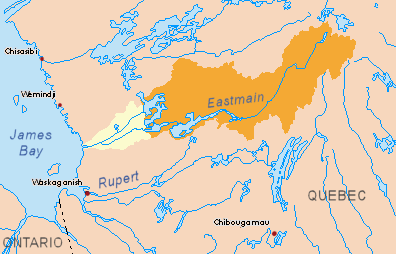
- Drainage basin of the Eastmain River. Current basin in yellow. Diverted basin to the La Grande River in orange. Original basin in yellow and orange.

Location
- Country: Canada
- Province: Quebec
- Region: Jamésie

Physical characteristics
- Source: Lac Bréhat
  - location: Baie-James, Nord-du-Québec, Québec, Canada
  - coordinates: 52°31′30″N 70°52′00″W
  - elevation: 554 m (1,818 ft)
- Mouth: James Bay
  - location: Eastmain, Nord-du-Québec, Quebec, Canada
  - coordinates: 52°14′30″N 78°34′00″W
  - elevation: 0 m (0 ft)
- Length: 756 km (470 mi)
- Basin size: 46,400 km^{2} (17,900 sq mi)
- Discharge
  - average: 930 m^{3}/s (33,000 cu ft/s)

Basin features
- Tributaries
  - left: (upstream) Eau Froide River, Miskimatao River, outlet of lake Sipestikuch, Causabiscau River, Wabistane River, Upstream from Opinaca Reservoir: Acotago River, outlet of lake Kapeykuck Ministiru, Nicolas River, Déry River, Caché Creek, outlet of "Lac de la Marée", Tichégami River, outlet of lakes Chamic and Mistamiquechamic, outlet of lake Clauzel, outlet of lake Lavalette, outlet of lake Cadieux, Saffray River; Upstream of Hécla Lake: outlet of lake Jules-Léger (via Bréhat Lake); Des Quatre-Temps River (via Bréhat Lake.
  - right: (upstream); La Pêche River (Eastmain), Opinaca River, Kauskatachinu Creek, Kasapawatach Creek, Rapin Creek, Wapatikw Creek, Upstream of Opinaca Reservoir: Wabamisk River, À l'Eau Claire River (Eastmain), outlet of lakes Village, outlet of lake Bauerman, Ross River (Eastmain River), Cauouatstacau River, Misask River; Upstream of Hécla Lake: Du Grand Portage Creek (via Hécla Lake), Léran River (via Hécla Lake)

The Eastmain River, formerly written East Main, is a river in west central Quebec. It rises in central Quebec and flows 800 km (500 mi) west to James Bay, draining an area of 46,400 km^{2} (17,900 sq mi). The First Nations Cree village of Eastmain is located beside the mouth.

== Name ==
Eastmain is a compounding of the river's former name East Main, which was taken from the former Hudson's Bay Company outpost at its mouth. This post controlled company trading operations in the East Main District on the eastern side of James Bay.

== Geography ==
Since the late 1980s, most of the waters of the Eastmain River have been diverted and flow northwards through the Opinaca Reservoir, with a surface area of about 950 square kilometres (370 sq mi), and into the Robert-Bourassa Reservoir of Hydro-Québec's La Grande Complex. The remainder of the Eastmain River contains only about 10 percent of the volume of its former flow, and is now subject to freeze-up in winter (see photo). These changes have affected the Cree and Inuit peoples who live along the Eastmain River and James Bay coast, making it more difficult for them to travel in winter and reducing their access to fish in the river.

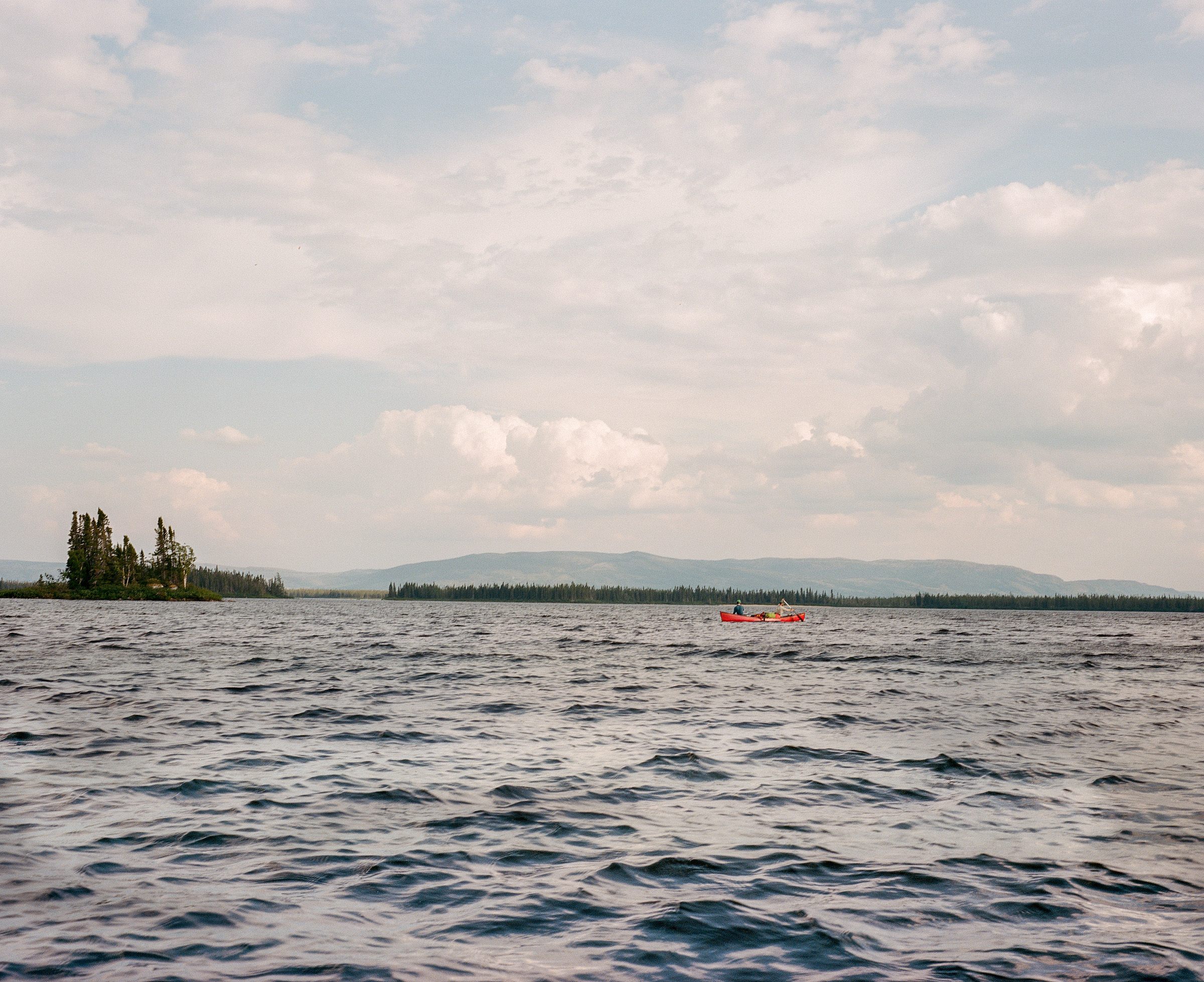
Upper Eastmain River with Otish Mountains

In 2005, a further hydroelectric project on the upper Eastmain River was under construction. The project was part of the original hydroelectric project provided for by the James Bay and Northern Quebec Agreement of 1975. The Eastmain Reservoir will eventually have a surface area of about 600 square kilometres (230 sq mi), and the Eastmain-1 power plant will generate a maximum of 900 MW.

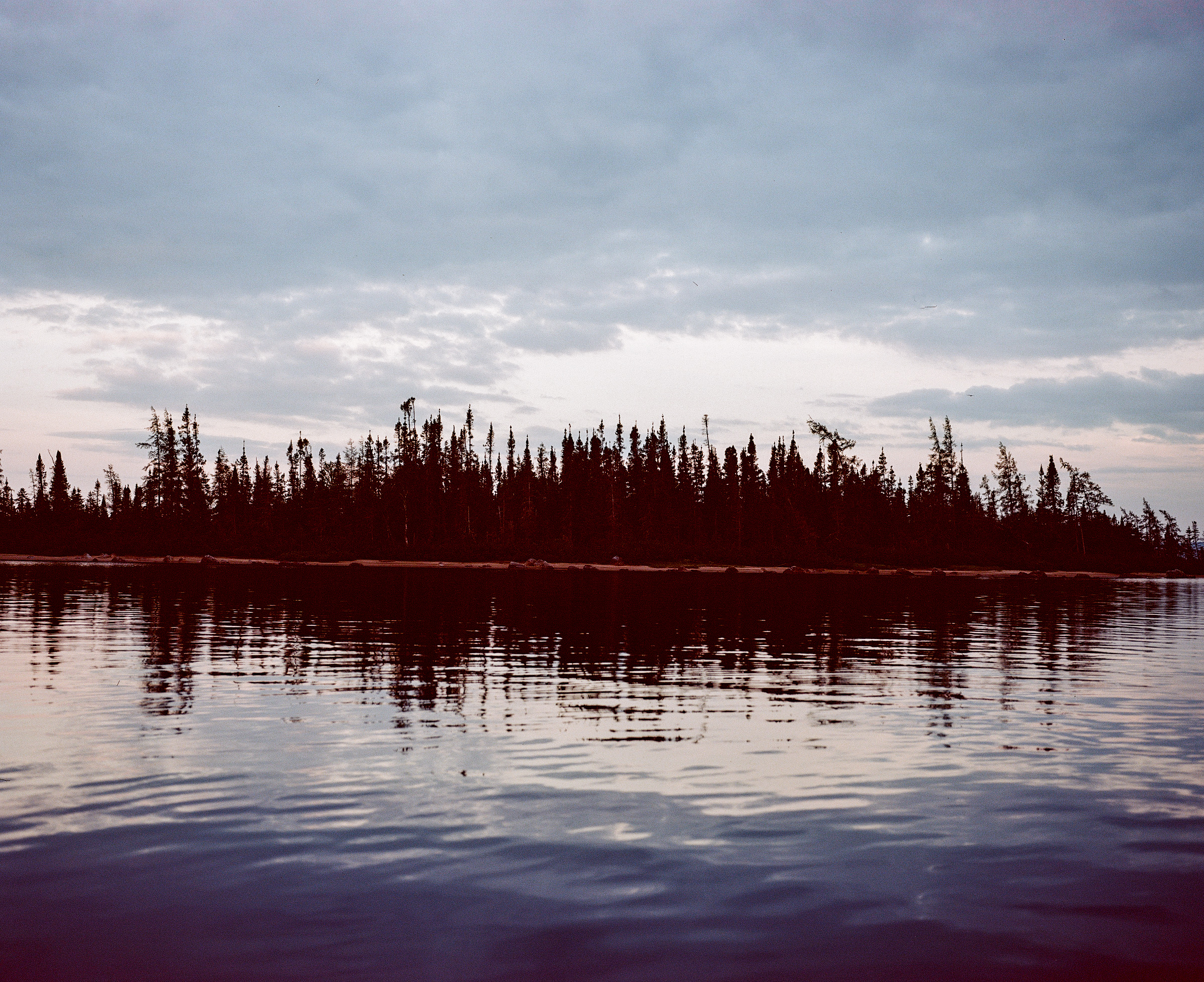
Boreal forest shoreline of Eastmain River

== History ==
The mouth of the Eastmain was a centre of the Hudson's Bay Company fur trade. Charles Bayly reached it from Rupert House in the 1670s. After Rupert House was destroyed in 1686, the area was visited by a ship from York Factory. In 1723 to 1724, Joseph Myatt of the Hudson's Bay Company built a post.

== See also ==
- Centrale Eastmain-1
- James Bay Project
- Jamésie
- List of rivers of Quebec
- List of longest rivers of Canada
