= Lovering =

Lovering is a surname. Notable people with the surname include:

- David Lovering (born 1961), American musician and magician
- George Mason Lovering (1832–1919), American soldier and Medal of Honor recipient
- Henry B. Lovering (1841–1911), American politician from Massachusetts
- Jane Lovering, British author
- John Francis Lovering (born 1930), Australian geologist
- Joseph Lovering (1813–1892), American scientist and educator
- Lawson Lovering (born 2003), American basketball player
- Otho Lovering (1892–1968), American film editor
- Paul Lovering (born 1975), Scottish footballer
- Thomas S. Lovering (1896–1991), American geologist
- William C. Lovering (1835–1910), American politician from Massachusetts

== See also ==
- Lake Lovering, a lake in Quebec, Canada
- USS Lovering, the name of more than one United States Navy ship
- Lovering Colony State Hospital, a former state hospital in Taunton, Massachusetts, in the United States
