= Taylor Lake =

Taylor Lake may refer to:

- Taylor Lake (Cumberland)
- Taylor Lake (Guysborough)
- Taylor Lake (Hants)
- Taylor Lake (Nova Scotia)
- Taylor Lake (Quebec)
- Taylor Lake (Saskatchewan)
- Taylor Lake (Clay County, Arkansas), a lake in Clay County, Arkansas
- Taylor Lake (Texas)
