= Lac Supérieur =

Lac Supérieur may refer to:

- Lake Superior (French: Lac Supérieur)
- Lac-Supérieur, a municipality of Quebec, Canada, named after Lake Superior
