= Mont Blanc, Quebec =

Ski resort in the Laurentian Mountains in Quebec, Canada

Coordinates: 46°06′06″N 74°29′03″W

Mont Blanc
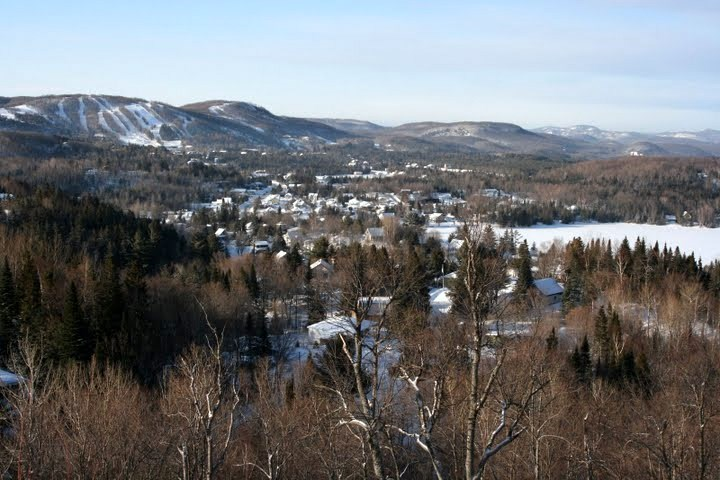
- Interactive map of Mont Blanc
- Location: Mont-Blanc, Quebec, Canada
- Vertical: 210 metres (690 ft)
- Top elevation: 580 m (1,900 ft)
- Trails: 43 total 15% Easy; 27% Intermediate; 46% Difficult; 12% Extremely difficult
- Lift system: 7 total 3 quadruple chair 2 triple chair 2 magic carpet
- Lift capacity: 10,350 skiers/hr
- Snowmaking: 85%
- Website: Ski Mont Blanc

Mont Blanc is a ski resort in the Laurentian Mountains and south of Mont-Tremblant, in Les Laurentides Regional County Municipality (MRC), in administrative region of Laurentides (region), in Quebec, Canada. It is located in the municipality of Mont-Blanc, just east of Mont Tremblant.

The resort was owned and operated by the Robinson family from 1976 to 2021. On September 12, 2021, the ski resort was purchased by the Groupe Forman, a developer. Since 2021, there has been an effort to develop Mont Blanc into a "four-season" resort, with chairlift-assisted mountain biking, water park (Wibit) and wakeboarding.

== Main recreational activities ==
The ski resort offers 208 vertical metres. This ski center is equipped with seven ski lifts. It has 43 trails as well as two snow parks and 2 learning areas. It offers a wide variety of trails suitable for all levels of skiers and snowboarders.

There are three distinct sides, or "versants", each with its own parking lot and chalet: the Versant Mont Blanc (site of the hotel, main cafeteria, rental shop, ski school and bar), often known colloquially as the "Hotel" side, Versant Faustin (which was formerly a separate ski area) and the Versant Nord (for more advanced skiers and snowboarders).

More than 130 certified instructors train new skiers (of all ages) who are learning a sliding sport (skiing, snowboarding) on gentle slopes, easy lifts and safe terrain. Since 2024, the mountain offers night skiing to its skiers on the Versant Mont Blanc, serving 10 illuminated slopes running from Friday to Sunday evenings.
