= Lac Sauvage =

- Location within Quebec
- Location: Bas-Saint-Laurent, Quebec, Canada
- Coordinates: 46°03′01″N 74°31′19″W
- Type: Freshwater lake
- Basin countries: Canada
- Managing agency: Organisme de bassins versants des rivières Rouge, Petite Nation et Saumon (OBV RPNS)
- Surface area: 50 ha (120 acres)
- Max. depth: 13.8 m (45 ft)
- Water volume: 4.9 million cubic metres (4,000 acre⋅ft)
- Surface elevation: 319 m (1,047 ft)

Lac Sauvage (English: Wild lake) is a freshwater lake in the Mont-Blanc municipality of Quebec, Canada.

A sealed road circumnavigates all but the Western shore of the lake, serving the cottages of the local residents. Powered craft such as motorboats have been forbidden since 1990.

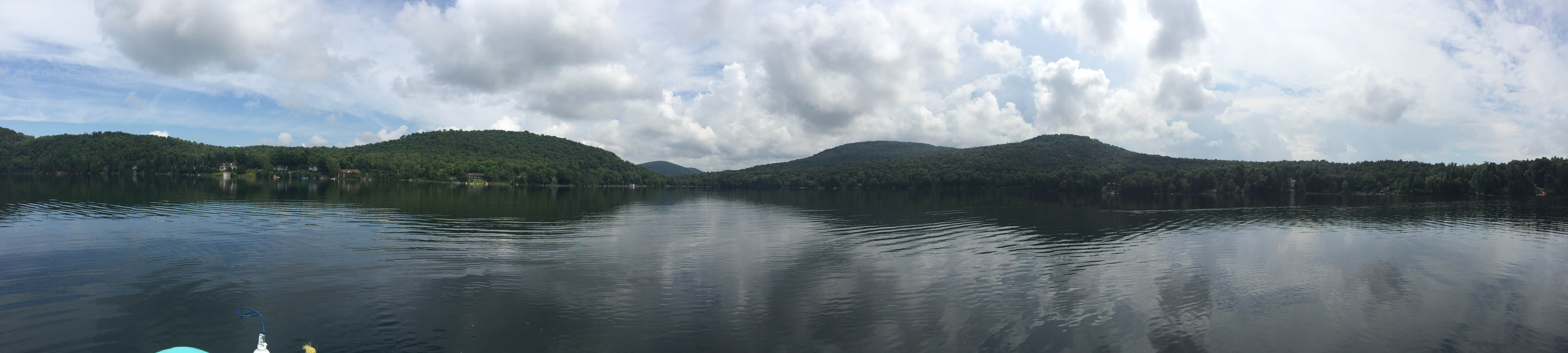
Northern side

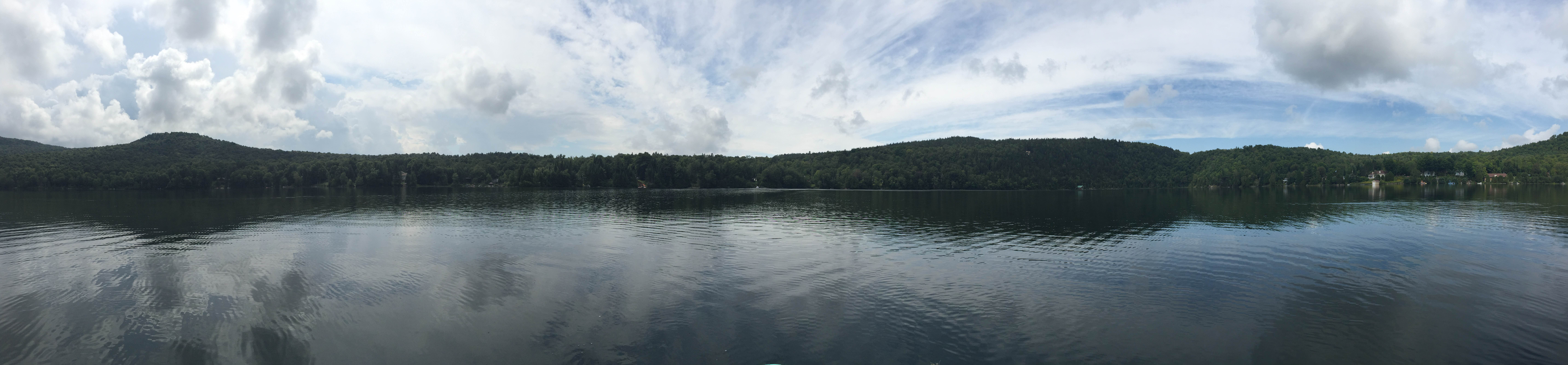
Southern side

== See also ==
- List of lakes of Quebec
