= Mont-Blanc, Quebec =

Mont-Blanc
- Municipality
- Municipalité de Mont-Blanc
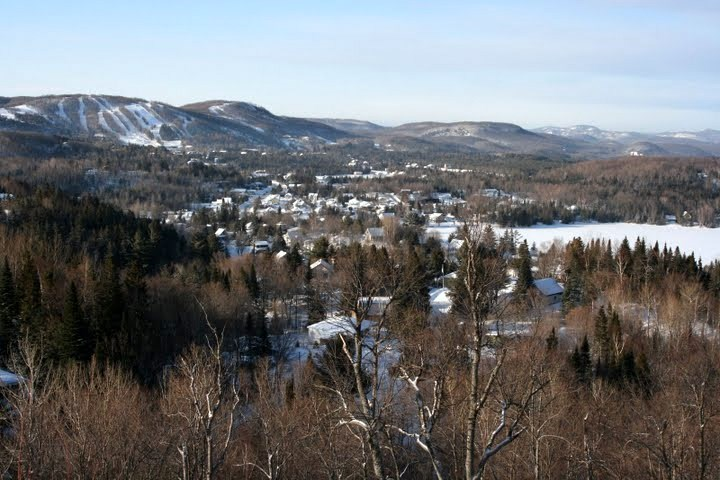
- Mont-Blanc with Mont Blanc in the background

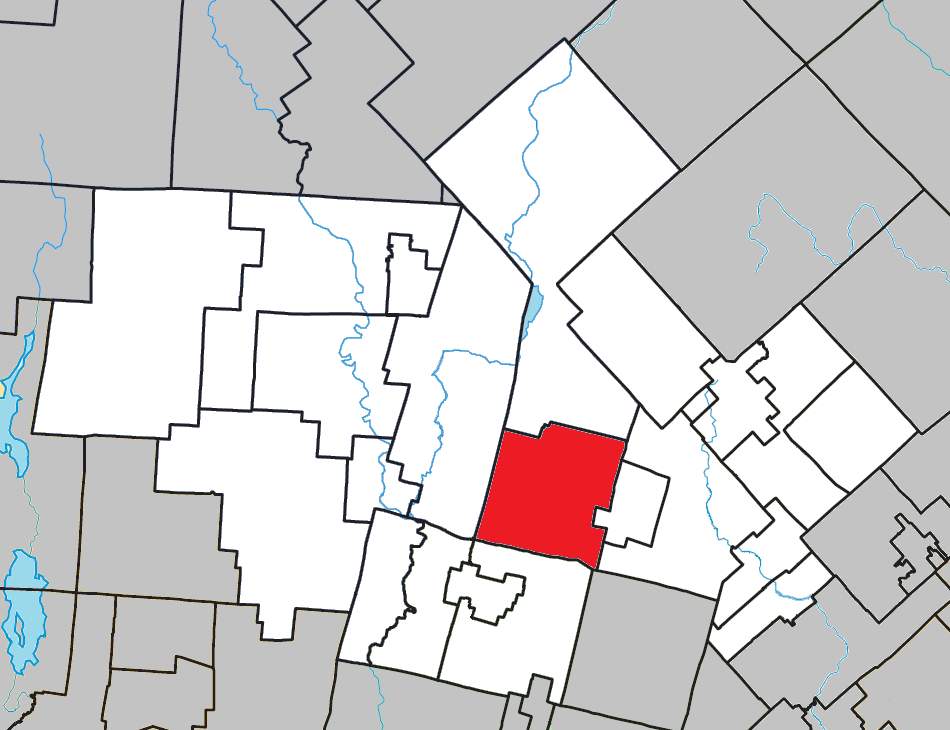
- Location within Les Laurentides RCM

- Location in central Quebec
- Coordinates: 46°07′N 74°29′W
- Country: Canada
- Province: Quebec
- Region: Laurentides
- RCM: Les Laurentides
- Settled: 1869
- Constituted: January 3, 1996
- Name change: January 29, 2022
- Named for: Mont Blanc

Government
  - Mayor: Jean Simon Levert
  - Fed. riding: Laurentides—Labelle
  - Prov. riding: Labelle

Area
  - Total: 128.93 km^{2} (49.78 sq mi)
  - Land: 120.21 km^{2} (46.41 sq mi)

Population (2021)
  - Total: 3,780
  - Density: 31.4/km^{2} (81/sq mi)
  - Change 2016-21: ▲8.0%
  - Dwellings: 2,520
- Time zone: UTC−5 (EST)
  - Summer (DST): UTC−4 (EDT)
- Postal code(s): J0T 2G0
- Area code(s): 819
- Highways: R-117 (TCH)
- Website: mont-blanc.quebec

Mont-Blanc (French pronunciation: [mɔ̃ blɑ̃]), is a municipality in the Laurentides region of Quebec, Canada, part of the Les Laurentides Regional County Municipality.

The municipality was formerly known as Saint-Faustin–Lac-Carré. The application to change the name to the Municipality of Mont-Blanc was approved by the Government of Quebec on January 14, 2022 and officially modified on January 29, 2022.

== History ==
Settlement of the Saint-Faustin area began in 1869 as part of Antoine Labelle's plan to colonize the Laurentians, and it was known as La Ripousse until 1879. In 1878, the Parish of Saint-Faustin was founded (named in honour of Faustinus), and the following year its post office opened. In 1957, the Municipality of Saint-Faustin-Sud was created when it separated from the Municipality of Saint-Faustin (now Lac-Supérieur). In 1960, its name was shortened to simply Saint-Faustin.

As for the Lac-Carré area, its development was spurred on by the construction of the railway in the 1890s. In 1900, the post office opened there under the name Saint-Faustin-Station, referring to the train station at that location. In 1922, the Village Municipality of Saint-Faustin-Station was formed, when it separated from the Township of Wolfe (now Lac-Supérieur). In 1947, it was renamed to Lac-Carré, after the lake around which it developed.

In 1996, the Municipality of Saint-Faustin–Lac-Carré was formed when the Village Municipality of Lac-Carré and the Municipality of Saint-Faustin merged. Its inhabitants were called Faustilacois and Faustilacoises. In 2022, the municipality was renamed to Mont-Blanc after the main mountain in its territory.

== Demographics ==
Canada census – Mont-Blanc, Quebec community profile

	2021	2016	2011
Population	3,780 (+8.0% from 2016)	3,499 (+0.9% from 2011)	3,467 (+16.1% from 2006)
Land area	120.21 km^{2} (46.41 sq mi)	121.53 km^{2} (46.92 sq mi)	121.28 km^{2} (46.83 sq mi)
Population density	31.4/km^{2} (81/sq mi)	28.8/km^{2} (75/sq mi)	28.6/km^{2} (74/sq mi)
Median age	45.2 (M: 45.2, F: 45.2)	43.2 (M: 43.7, F: 42.8)	42.8 (M: 43.1, F: 42.4)
Private dwellings	2,520 (total) 1,791 (occupied)	2,517 (total)	2,407 (total)
Median household income	$70,500	$56,741	$47,983

References: 2021 2016 2011

Historical census populations – Mont-Blanc
Year	Pop.	±%
2001	2,790	—
2006	2,985	+7.0%
2011	3,467	+16.1%
2016	3,499	+0.9%
2021	3,780	+8.0%
Source: Statistics Canada

Home Language (2021)
Language	Population	Percentage (%)
French	3,565	94%
English	135	4%
Other	25	1%

Mother Tongue (2021)
Language	Population	Percentage (%)
French	3,525	93%
English	140	4%
Other	55	2%

Visible Minorities (2021)
Ethnicity	Population	Percentage (%)
Not a visible minority	3,730	99%
Visible minorities	45	1%

== Education ==
Sainte Agathe Academy (of the Sir Wilfrid Laurier School Board) in Sainte-Agathe-des-Monts serves English-speaking students in this community for both elementary and secondary levels.

== See also ==
- Lac Sauvage
