= Saint-François-Xavier-de-Brompton =

- Municipality
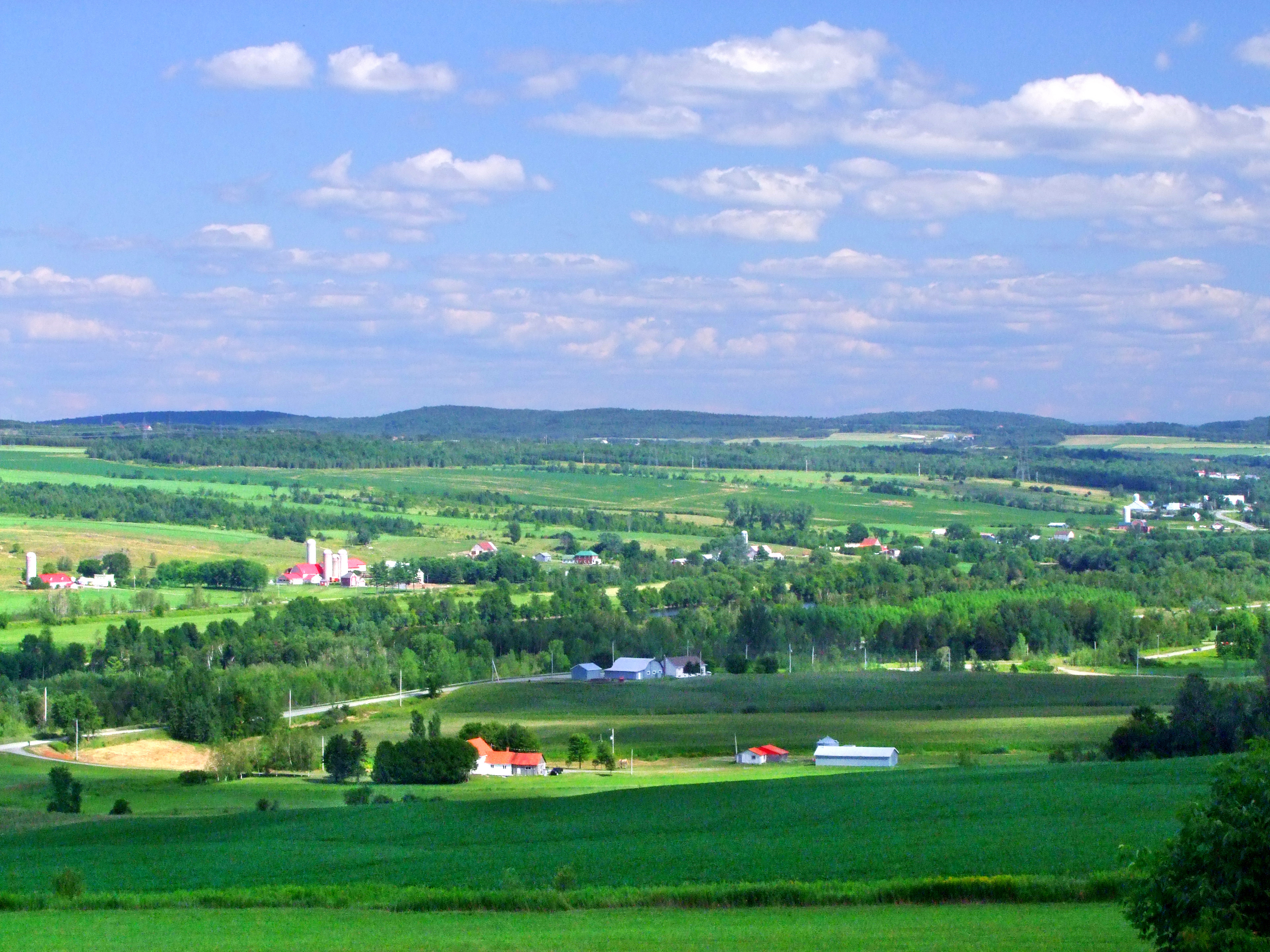

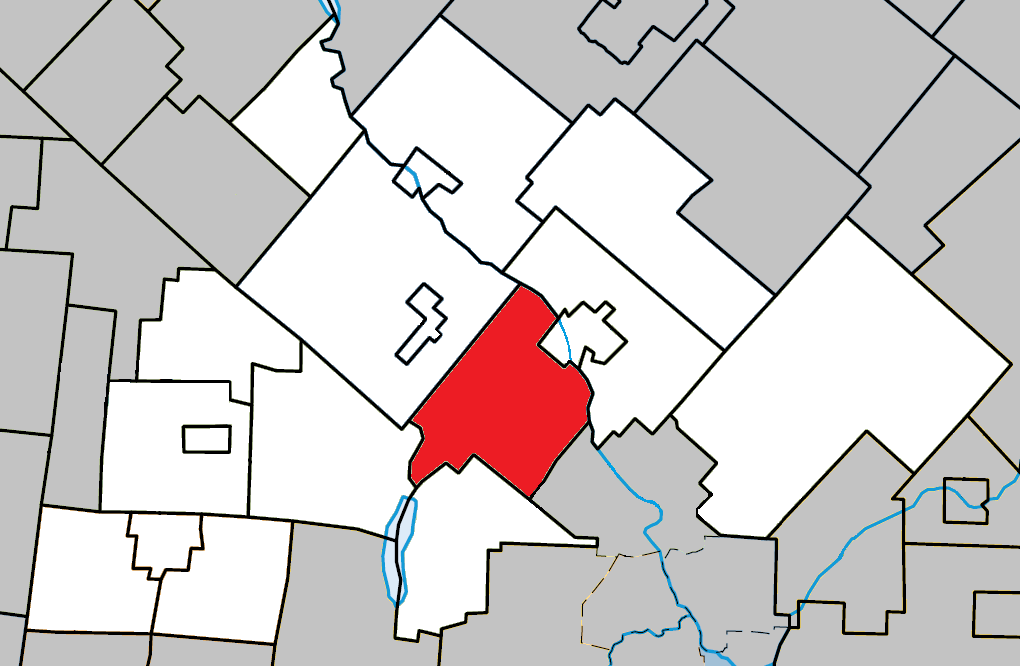
- Location within Le Val-Saint-François RCM

- Location in southern Quebec
- Coordinates: 45.5333°N 72.05°W
- Country: Canada
- Province: Quebec
- Region: Estrie
- RCM: Le Val-Saint-François
- Constituted: December 28, 1887

Government
  - Mayor: Alexandre Roy
  - Federal riding: Richmond—Arthabaska—des-Sources
  - Prov. riding: Richmond

Area
  - Total: 98.90 km^{2} (38.19 sq mi)
  - Land: 97.51 km^{2} (37.65 sq mi)

Population (2011)
  - Total: 2,101
  - Density: 21.5/km^{2} (56/sq mi)
  - Pop 2006-2011: ▲4.1%
  - Dwellings: 886
- Time zone: UTC−5 (EST)
  - Summer (DST): UTC−4 (EDT)
- Postal code(s): J0B 2V0
- Area code: 819
- Highways A-55: R-249
- Website: www.municipalite. sfxb.qc.ca

Saint-François-Xavier-de-Brompton is a municipality in Le Val-Saint-François Regional County Municipality in the Estrie region of Quebec, Canada. Prior to November 16, 2013 it was a parish municipality.

== Demographics ==
=== Population ===
Historical Census Data - Saint-François-Xavier-de-Brompton, Quebec
Year	Pop.	±%
1991	1,834	—
1996	2,008	+9.5%
2001	2,001	−0.3%
2006	2,018	+0.8%
2011	2,101	+4.1%

=== Language ===
Mother tongue (2011)

Language	Population	Pct (%)
French only	2,040	96.9%
English only	40	1.9%
English and French	15	0.7%
Non-official languages	10	0.5%

== See also ==
- List of municipalities in Quebec
- Petit Lac Saint-François
