= Opinaca Reservoir =

Lake in the northwest of Quebec, Canada

- Location in Quebec
- Location: Nord-du-Québec, Quebec
- Coordinates: 52°38′58″N 76°19′54″W
- Primary inflows: Opinaca River
- Primary outflows: Opinaca River
- Catchment area: 30,000 km^{2} (12,000 sq mi)
- Basin countries: Canada
- Surface area: 1,040 km^{2} (400 sq mi)
- Average depth: 8.2 m (27 ft)
- Max. depth: 51 m (167 ft)
- Water volume: 8.5 km^{3} (6,900,000 acre⋅ft)
- Residence time: 0.34 years
- Shore length^{1}: 2,200 km (1,400 mi)
- Surface elevation: 216 m (709 ft)
- Frozen: December to May
- ^{1} Shore length is not a well-defined measure.

Opinaca Reservoir is a lake in the northwest of the province of Quebec in Canada. It is located 140 km east of James Bay, south of the Robert-Bourassa Reservoir and south of Lac Sakami. It is connected by a 41 km narrows to the Eastmain Reservoir located east.

Opinaca Reservoir is a reservoir of the James Bay Project with an elevation of 216 m (709 ft) and an area of 1,040 km^{2} (400 sq mi).

== See also ==
- List of lakes of Quebec
