= Lake 3.1416 =

Lake in Quebec, Canada

- Location within Quebec
- Location: Rivière-aux-Outardes, Quebec
- Coordinates: 49°45′07″N 68°06′48″W
- Surface area: 0.78 square kilometres (0.30 sq mi)

Lake 3.1416 is a small lake (0.78 km^{2}) in the municipality Rivière-aux-Outardes, Quebec, Canada, in the administrative region Côte-Nord.

The lake gets its name from the fact that three property owners have a camp that is 14 feet wide and 16 feet long.

== See also ==
- List of lakes of Quebec
- The number pi.
