= Mayo, Quebec =

Mayo
- Municipality
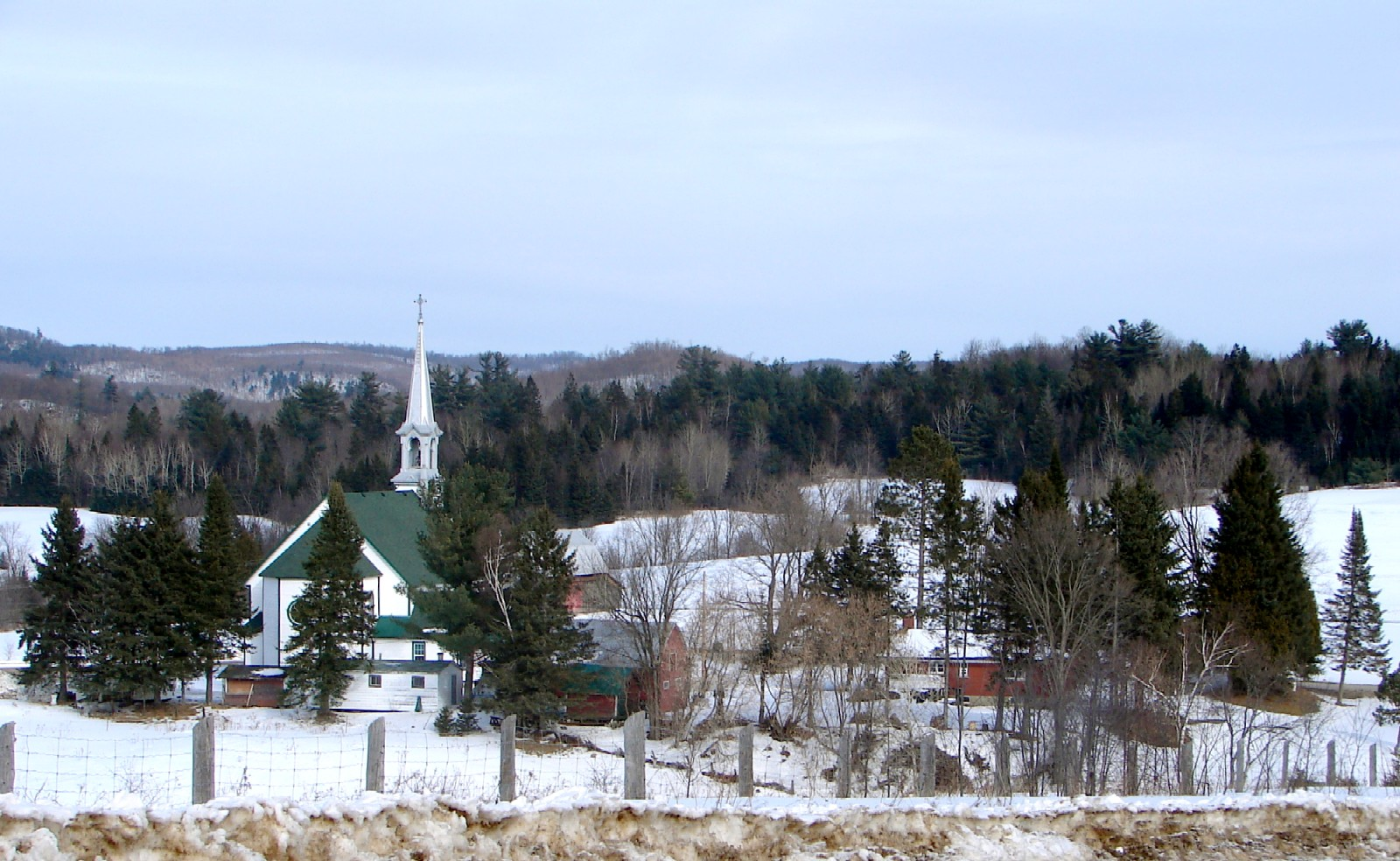

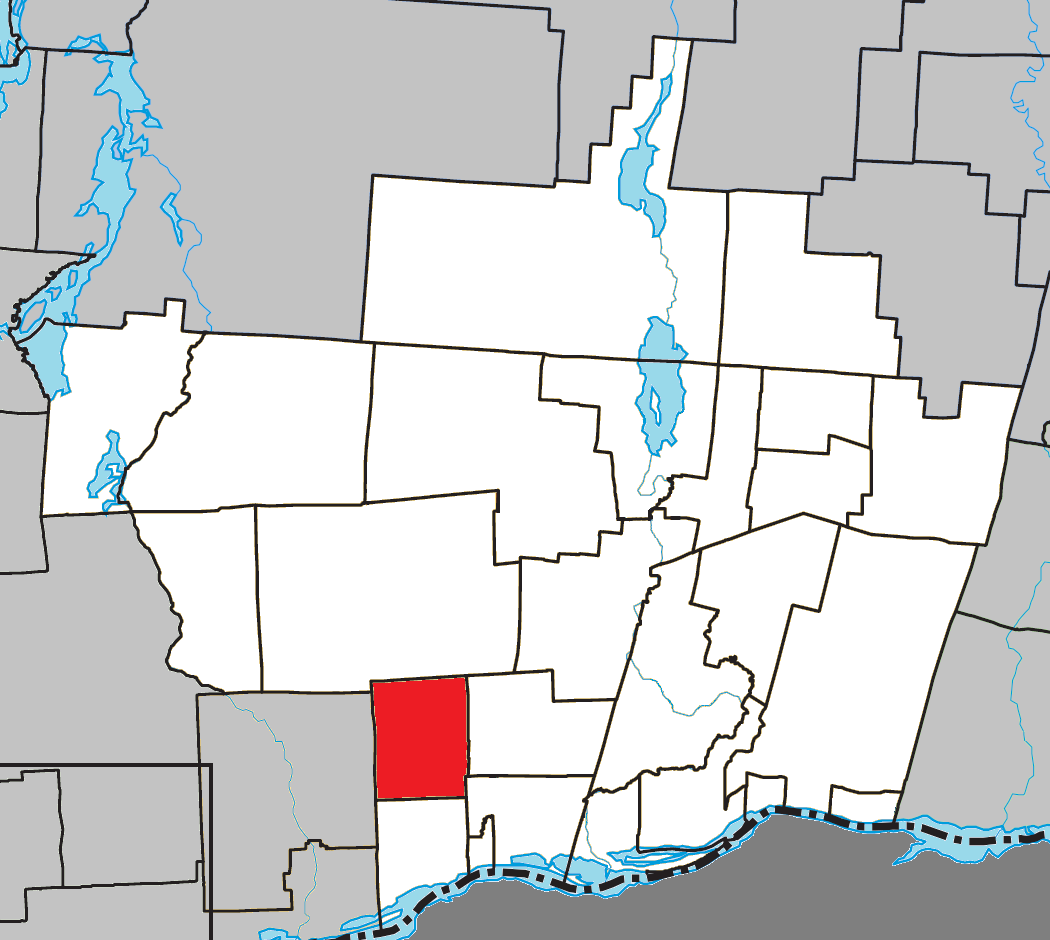
- Location within Papineau RCM

- Location in western Quebec
- Coordinates: 45°40′N 75°21′W
- Country: Canada
- Province: Quebec
- Region: Outaouais
- RCM: Papineau
- Constituted: August 1, 1864

Government
  - Mayor: Robert Bertrand
  - Federal riding: Argenteuil—La Petite-Nation
  - Prov. riding: Papineau

Area
  - Total: 77.50 km^{2} (29.92 sq mi)
  - Land: 72.51 km^{2} (28.00 sq mi)

Population (2021)
  - Total: 704
  - Density: 9.7/km^{2} (25/sq mi)
  - Pop 2016-2021: ▲17.1%
  - Dwellings: 395
- Time zone: UTC−5 (EST)
  - Summer (DST): UTC−4 (EDT)
- Postal code(s): J8L 4J7
- Area code: 819
- Highways: R-315

Mayo is a municipality in the Papineau Regional County Municipality of western Quebec, located northeast of the city of Gatineau (Buckingham sector). Mayo is south of the hamlet of Mulgrave-et-Derry.

== History ==
The area which would become the municipality of Mayo in 1864, just north of the township of Lochaber, began to be settled in the nineteenth century mainly by Irish and German immigrants as well as French Canadians. The Irish settlers arrived in Mayo between 1820–1830, pre-famine immigrants. They would have arrived in Montreal and traveled along the Ottawa River and then along the Blanche River. The settlers would have found great comfort in their new surroundings, the hilly terrain resembling that of Ireland, and subsequently their new home was named Mayo after County Mayo in Ireland. The main industries which drive the economics of the municipality were, and still are, farming and forestry as well as the manufacturing of potash.

== Demographics ==
Canada census – Mayo community profile

	2021	2016	2011
Population	704 (+17.1% from 2016)	601 (5.1% from 2011)	572 (4.2% from 2006)
Land area	72.51 km^{2} (28.00 sq mi)	73.25 km^{2} (28.28 sq mi)	72.06 km^{2} (27.82 sq mi)
Population density	9.7/km^{2} (25/sq mi)	8.2/km^{2} (21/sq mi)	7.9/km^{2} (20/sq mi)
Median age	46.4 (M: 45.2, F: 47.6)	43.6 (M: 43.6, F: 43.7)	47.6 (M: 46.9, F: 47.9)
Private dwellings	395 (total) 297 (occupied)	403 (total)	347 (total)
Median household income	$88,000	$68,992	$39,824

References: 2021 2016 2011

Historical census populations – Mayo, Quebec
Year	Pop.	±%
1986	338	—
1991	370	+9.5%
1996	401	+8.4%
2001	443	+10.5%
2006	549	+23.9%
2011	572	+4.2%
2016	601	+5.1%
2021	704	+17.1%
Source: Statistics Canada

Mother tongue:

- English as first language: 24.1%
- French as first language: 68.1%
- English and French as first language: 5%
- Other as first language: 2.1%

== Our Lady of Knock Shrine ==
The people of Mayo had a strong connection with their Irish roots. The parish of St. Malachy in Mayo was very important in the municipality's connection with Ireland. In County Mayo, Ireland there is a town called Knock where, in 1879, there were reports of an apparition of the Virgin Mary, St. Joseph and St. John. The story of this miracle was brought to Canada as early as 1882, and in 1949 the then pastor of St. Malachy, Father Braceland, was inspired to construct a replica of the Our Lady of Knock Shrine in Mayo.

== La Blanche Forest ==
The La Blanche forest, located on the eastern shores of La Blanche Lake in Mayo and Mulgrave-et-Derry, contains rare old-growth forest and many endangered plant species such as ginseng. The forest is protected in the Forêt-la-Blanche Ecological Reserve, a 20.52 square kilometres (7.92 sq mi) area of preservation for this forest which has been sheltered from disturbance for centuries. The forest is also home to many species of rare birds such as the blue heron and the cerulean warbler. The La Blanche forest was designated a permanent protected area in October 2003 giving it the legal distinction of an ecological reserve, the highest protection possible in Quebec.

== See also ==
- List of anglophone communities in Quebec
