= Lake Arpin =

Lake in Lantier, Quebec, Canada

- Location within Quebec
- Location: Lantier, Les Laurentides Regional County Municipality, Quebec J0T 1V0
- Coordinates: 46.13078°N 74.281483°W
- Primary outflows: Lac Magnan
- Max. length: .825 km (0.513 mi)
- Max. width: .410 km (0.255 mi)

Lake Arpin is a small lake located in the Laurentian Mountains of Quebec, Canada. This is a non populated lake. The first house to be built close to the water was in 2005. Until this house was built, the only access point was Chemin du Sentier, an almost fully grown-in dirt road. A bridge now gives access from Chemin du Lac Arpin to a small river which connects to the lake. This lake is used in the summer months by a Jewish Hasidic community located across the street, the four families who have summer houses on the lake and the families who live on connecting lakes: lac Magnan and lac Papineau.

The fish population in the lake includes perch, sun fish, cat fish and muskellunge.

== See also ==
- List of lakes of Quebec
