= Lac La Blanche =

Lake in Quebec, Canada

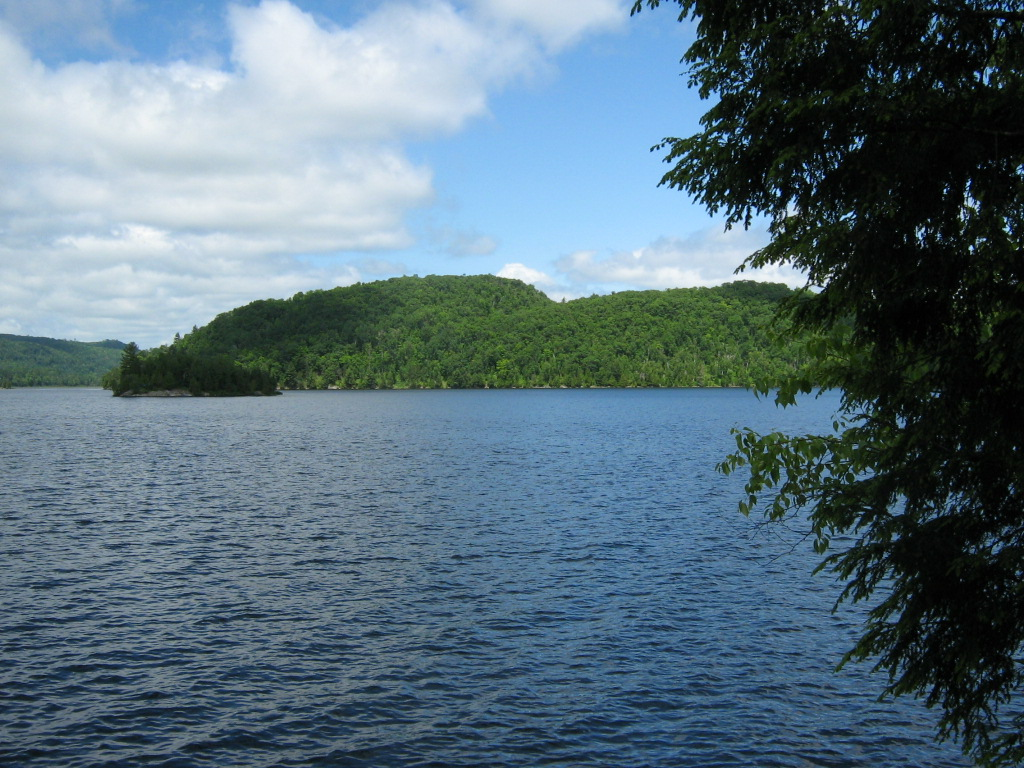

- Location within Quebec
- Location: Mulgrave-et-Derry / Mayo, Papineau Regional County Municipality, Quebec
- Coordinates: 45°43′25″N 75°19′10″W
- Primary inflows: Inlet River
- Primary outflows: Blanche River
- Basin countries: Canada
- Max. length: 4 km (2.5 mi)
- Max. width: 2.8 km (1.7 mi)
- Islands: 5

Lac La Blanche (French, meaning "White Lake") is a small lake located on the boundary between Mulgrave-et-Derry and Mayo, Quebec, Canada. The lake has three islands.

A 20.52 square kilometres (7.92 sq mi) area between its eastern shores and Lac Britannique (Britannia Lake) is protected in the Forêt-la-Blanche Ecological Reserve. This area contains a rare old-growth forest and many endangered plant species.

Fish species: mostly Largemouth bass, Yellow Perch, Sunfish, Catfish, and trout.

== See also ==
- List of lakes in Canada
