= Lake Vlimeux =

Lake in Quebec, Canada

- Location within Quebec
- Location: Mékinac Regional County Municipality, Mauricie, Quebec
- Coordinates: 46°50′41″N 72°41′43″W
- Type: natural
- Basin countries: Canada
- Max. length: 2.1 km (1.3 mi)
- Max. width: 0.450 km (0.280 mi)

The Lake Vlimeux straddles in two municipalities Saint-Roch-de-Mékinac and Sainte-Thècle, in the Mekinac Regional County Municipality, in Mauricie, in Quebec, in Canada. This lake is marking the former northwestern boundary of the lordship of Batiscan, which was once the property of Jesuits.

== Geography ==
Lake Vlimeux is located mainly in the territory of rank 1 Saint-Roch-de-Mékinac, some in row 2, and the part in Sainte-Thècle is included in the range II South Western Lejeune Township. This lake is located 4.3 km (direct line) east of Saint-Maurice River, 3.5 km (direct line) north of Second Lake Roberge, 6.4 km (direct line) south of the church of Saint-Joseph-de-Mékinac and 6.4 km (direct line) west of Lake Jesuit.

Lake Vlimeux covers 1.1 km^{2} and is 2.1 km long. This lake has three sections, the respective width: southern part (300 m.), Long bay with a 100 m wide central part (450 m) and northern part (700 m). Five tributaries of Lake Vlimeux, three islands and peninsulas give it a very irregular contour. The shape of the lake resembles a tree whose height is facing south. The lake Vlimeux receives the water from lake Pleau and Lake Elizabeth, located to the south.

The lake Vlimeux draining from the north into the creek Vlimeux, which crosses the Little lake Vlimeux. Both lakes are spaced by 150 meters. Possessed by the Government of Québec, a dam is arranged at the mouth of Little Lake Vlimeux. Thence Vlimeux Creek flows north and cut three woodlots west end of the territory of Sainte-Thècle (row 1 Southwest). The stream continues his journey in the territory of Trois-Rives, branching off to the northwest, draining the rows I and II, and will flow into the Mekinac River, which in turn flows west to empty into the Saint-Maurice River.

== Toponymy ==
"Lake Vlimeux" appears on a map of the Lejeune Township in 1881. The name "Lake Vlimeux" appears in the 1914 in edition of "Dictionary of rivers and lakes in the province of Quebec". This gazetteer designation has undergone several variations on forest maps such as Villemieux and Vilimieux.

In 1959, the Commission de toponymie du Québec (Geographic Board of Québec) has standardized this case under the name "Lake Venimeux". This name appears in the "Gazette officielle du Québec" in 1969 and "Gazette officielle du Québec" in 1978. Finally, the Geographical Names Board of Québec changed his mind by restoring the old form, the toponym "Lake Vlimeux" was officially registered on January 31, 1980, the Bank of place names in Commission de toponymie du Québec (Geographical Names Board of Quebec) given that the toponym "Lake Vlimeux" was well established in the regional dialect.

In the ancient language of French-Canadians, the term "vlimeux" evokes the unpredictability, malicious, mischievous, mocking or "ratoureur" a person to reach his ends subtly, sometimes making use of indirect means to deceive. The Wikdictionnaire attributed quasi-synonyms such as: playful, "ratoureux", comic, inconvenient or tanning. Seeking to know the etymology of the term, some researchers argue the thesis that the toponym "vlimeux" would be a derivative of "poisonous". Moreover, in modern parlance, the term usually has a pleasant or nice, used in addressing children connotation. However, use of the term "Vlimeux" for naming a place is unusual.

== See also ==
- Grandes-Piles
