= Roggan Lake =

Lake in Quebec, Canada

- Location within Quebec
- Location: Baie-James, Quebec
- Coordinates: 54°08′37″N 77°47′32″W
- Basin countries: Canada

Roggan Lake (Lac Roggan) is a lake in western Quebec, Canada.
