= Lake Yasinski =

- Lac Yasinski
- Location in Quebec
- Location: Jamésie, Quebec
- Coordinates: 53°16′41″N 77°34′59″W
- Type: lake
- Part of: James Bay drainage basin
- Primary inflows: Iskutawapu Sakahikanistikw River
- Primary outflows: Maquatua River
- Basin countries: Canada
- Max. length: 23 km (14 mi)
- Max. width: 4 km (2.5 mi)
- Surface elevation: 142 m (466 ft)

Lake Yasinski (French: Lac Yasinski) is a lake in Baie-James municipality, Jamésie territory, in Nord-du-Québec, Quebec, Canada. It is in the James Bay drainage basin about 80 kilometres (50 mi) east of James Bay.

The primary inflow, at the southwest, is the Iskutawapu Sakahikanistikw River. The primary outflow at the west, is the Maquatua River, which flows to James Bay at the community of Wemindji.

The James Bay Road passes along the northeast shore of the lake and over the Lake Yasinki Culvert (French: Ponceau du Lac-Yasinski), just south of the start of the Trans-Taiga Road.
