= Low Lake =

Lake in Quebec, Canada

- Location within Quebec
- Location: Baie-James, Quebec
- Coordinates: 52°28′51″N 76°18′29″W
- Basin countries: Canada

Low Lake (or Lac Low) is a lake in western Quebec, Canada. It is located in the municipality of Baie-James.
