= Lac Lancre =

Lake in Quebec, Canada

- Location within Quebec
- Coordinates: 47°19′39″N 77°33′56″W
- Settlements: Réservoir-Dozois (unorganized area)

Lac Lancre is a lake in the Canadian province of Quebec. This lake is located in Réservoir-Dozois (unorganized area), La Vallée-de-l'Or (regional county municipality, Abitibi-Témiscamingue (administrative region), Quebec, Canada.
