= Lake Kapibouska =

- Location within Central Quebec
- Interactive map of Lake Kapibouska
- Location: Saint-Tite, Quebec
- Coordinates: 46.7153°N 72.5749°W
- Type: Former lake
- River sources: Rivière des Envies
- Basin countries: Canada

The former Lake Kapibouska was formed artificially by a bulge in the Rivière des Envies, in the city of Saint-Tite, in the Mekinac Regional County Municipality, in Mauricie, in Quebec, in Canada.

== Geography ==
The lake Kapibouska was located southwest of the city of Saint-Tite, between the street and the current bridge built on the road "Haut-du-Lac Nord" on the Rivière des Envies. The current distance between this bridge and "Le Bourdais street" bridge is 3 km (in direct line). Roads "Haut-du-lac Nord" and "Haut-du-lac Sud" were the contour of this old lake. These two parallel roads are generally spaced between 0.4 km to 0.7 km. While the distance between the bridge spanning "Le Bourdais stream" and Little Mékinac North River is 3.8 km (in direct line). This old lake had an elongated shape with a curve to the South toward the bridge of the "Du Moulin street", where the topography of the surrounding land brought a strong narrowing of the watercourse.

It is possible that the lake extended further south of the "Du Moulin street", probably up to the railway bridge, spanning the Rivière des Envies, because of other beaver dams in downstream. Referring to today's topography, the delimitation of the former lake Kapibouska is difficult to define, particularly because of embankments erected in history to enlarge the grounds of individuals, businesses or support to establish routes or bridges. In addition, the leveling of agricultural land has changed the surrounding terrain in places.

Until the late 19th century, a series of beaver dams kept the level of water of this reservoir. Several colonies of beavers maintained their habitats. Following the settlement of the area, since 1833, the Beavers have been victims of overhunting for their fur because of the damage they caused to the trees. With the decline of the beaver population, the inhabitants of Saint-Tite progressively destroyed (and sometimes they organized public chores) these beaver dams in the late 19th century.

During spring floods, the lake Kapibouska sometimes caused destructive flooding to the surrounding buildings, roads, sawmills, agriculture and stacks of wood. These dams interfere with the descent of logs floating on the river between places of cutting and sawmills, requiring more activities to loggers or "cageux". However, the level control of the reservoir allow the inhabitants to carry on the lake (and a small segment of the tributaries) in river boats, on wooden cages or rafts. The lake also favored roads ice over the river to connect Saint-Stanislas, before the development of crossable roads on each shores.

== Toponymy ==
"Kapibouska" comes from an Algonquin word meaning "where there are reeds".

== History ==
Saint-Just-de-Kapibouska mission was established in 1851 around Lake Kapibouska or on the site of the present city of Saint-Tite. When the canonical foundation 1859, Bishop of Diocese of Trois-Rivières retained the toponym Saint-Tite. While civil erection of the parish municipality date of 1863. The parish was named in honor of Titus, apostle, companion Paul and Bishop of Knossos

== See also ==
- Saint-Tite
- Rivière des Envies
- Batiscanie, Quebec
