= Julian Lake =

Lake in Eeyou Istchee Baie-James, Quebec, Canada

- Location within Quebec
- Location: Baie-James, Quebec
- Coordinates: 54°25′03″N 77°58′22″W
- Basin countries: Canada

Julian Lake is a lake in western Quebec, Canada, situated east of Hudson Bay.
