= Lac-Supérieur =

- Municipality
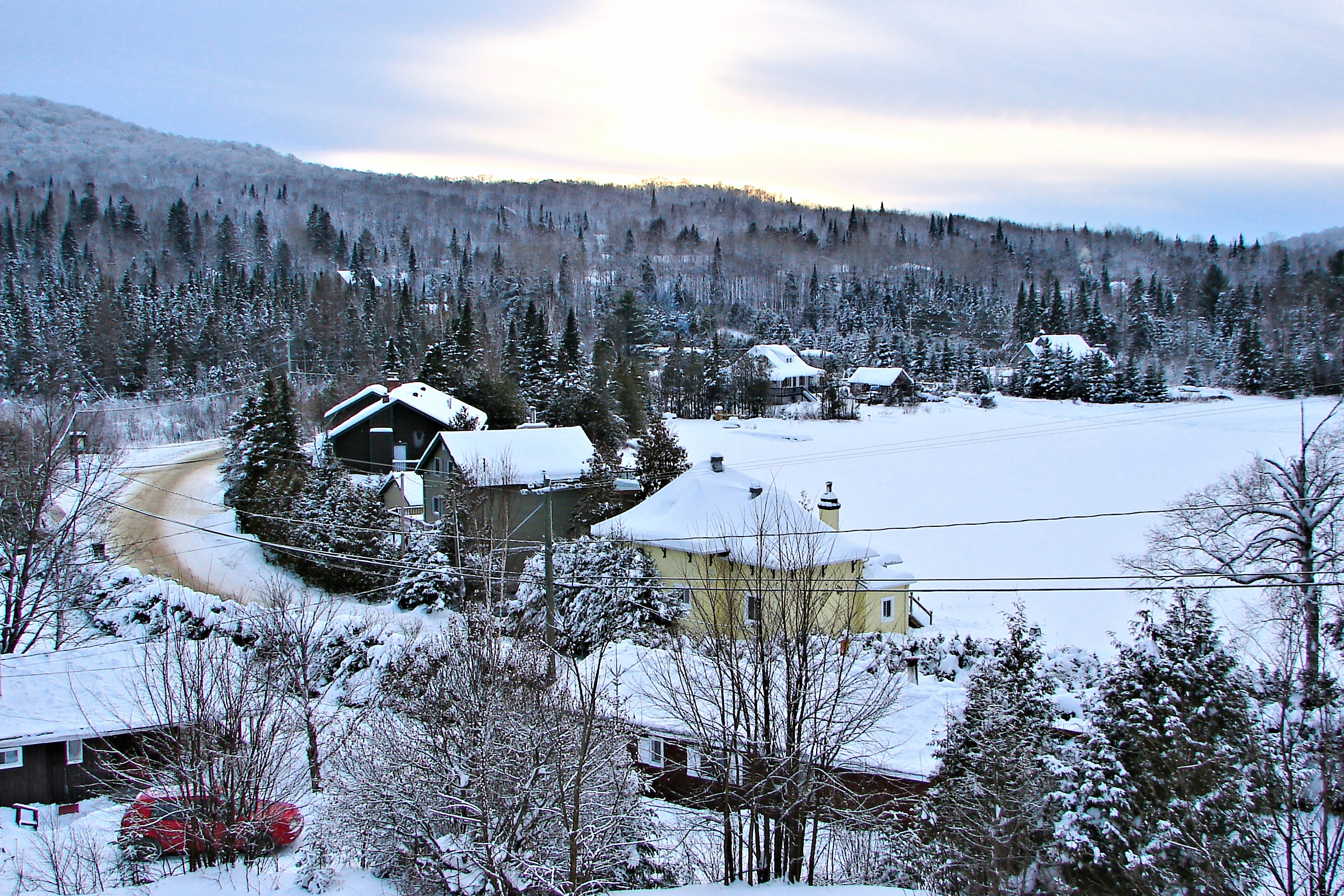
- Lac-Supérieur in winter

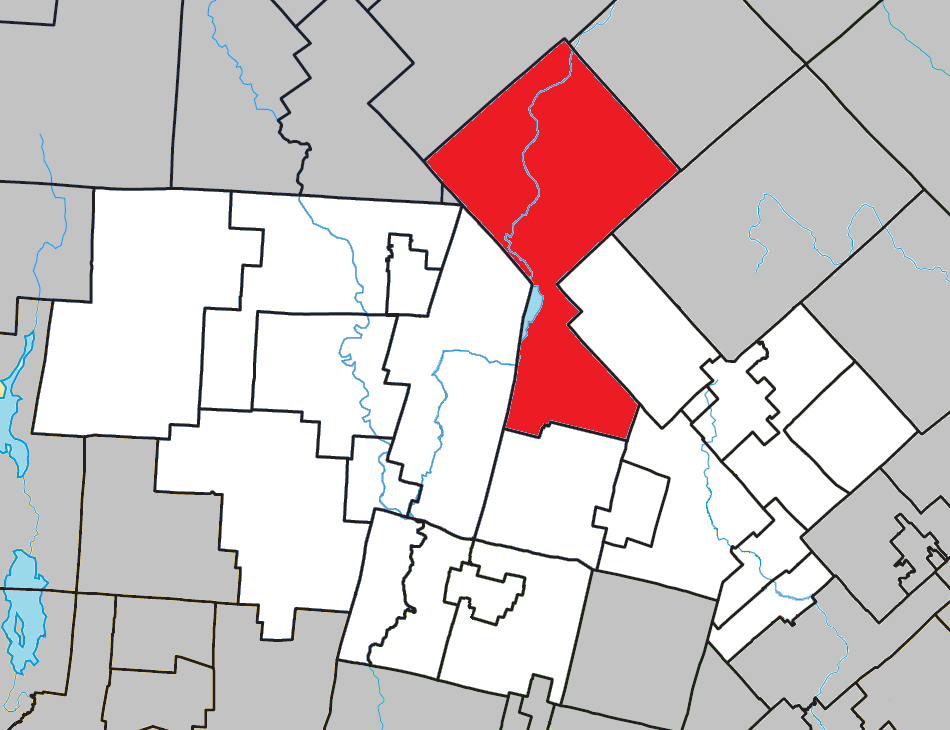
- Location within Les Laurentides RCM

- Location in central Quebec
- Coordinates: 46°12′N 74°28′W
- Country: Canada
- Province: Quebec
- Region: Laurentides
- RCM: Les Laurentides
- Settled: 1881
- Constituted: January 1, 1881

Government
  - Mayor: Steve Perreault
  - Fed. riding: Laurentides—Labelle
  - Prov. riding: Labelle

Area
  - Total: 386.25 km^{2} (149.13 sq mi)
  - Land: 365.98 km^{2} (141.31 sq mi)

Population (2021)
  - Total: 1,972
  - Density: 5.4/km^{2} (14/sq mi)
  - Change 2016-21: ▲4.4%
  - Dwellings: 1,718
- Time zone: UTC−5 (EST)
  - Summer (DST): UTC−4 (EDT)
- Postal code(s): J0T 1J0 & J0T 1P0
- Area code: 819
- Highways: No major routes
- Website: www.muni.lacsuperieur.qc.ca

Lac-Supérieur (French pronunciation: [lak sypeʁjœʁ]) is a municipality in the Laurentides region of Quebec, Canada, part of the Les Laurentides Regional County Municipality. It is named after Lake Superior (Lac Supérieur) in the Laurentian Mountains, due east of Mont Tremblant Resort. The community of Lac-Supérieur is just south of the lake, which itself is ringed with cottages. The entire northern portion of the municipality is mostly undeveloped and part of the Mont-Tremblant National Park.

== History ==
The municipality was formed in 1881 and initially named Wolfe, in tribute to British General James Wolfe. Its first settlers were Canadians repatriated from California and the western United States.

In 1944, the municipality was renamed to Saint-Faustin, the name of the parish founded in 1878 in what is now part of Mont-Blanc. In 1957, it was renamed again to its present name, a designation previously assigned to the post office which opened in 1913.

== Geography ==
=== Climate ===
Climate data for Lac-Supérieur, Quebec
Month	Jan	Feb	Mar	Apr	May	Jun	Jul	Aug	Sep	Oct	Nov	Dec	Year
Record high °C (°F)	11.0 (51.8)	13.5 (56.3)	20.0 (68.0)	29.0 (84.2)	32.5 (90.5)	34.0 (93.2)	34.5 (94.1)	36.1 (97.0)	33.5 (92.3)	27.0 (80.6)	19.0 (66.2)	13.0 (55.4)	36.1 (97.0)
Mean daily maximum °C (°F)	−7.3 (18.9)	−4.6 (23.7)	1.5 (34.7)	9.1 (48.4)	16.9 (62.4)	22.0 (71.6)	24.2 (75.6)	22.9 (73.2)	18.0 (64.4)	10.5 (50.9)	3.0 (37.4)	−4.3 (24.3)	9.3 (48.7)
Daily mean °C (°F)	−13.4 (7.9)	−11.3 (11.7)	−5.1 (22.8)	3.2 (37.8)	10.4 (50.7)	15.6 (60.1)	18.1 (64.6)	16.9 (62.4)	12.4 (54.3)	5.7 (42.3)	−1.0 (30.2)	−9.3 (15.3)	3.5 (38.3)
Mean daily minimum °C (°F)	−19.3 (−2.7)	−17.9 (−0.2)	−11.8 (10.8)	−2.8 (27.0)	3.9 (39.0)	9.1 (48.4)	11.9 (53.4)	10.9 (51.6)	6.7 (44.1)	0.8 (33.4)	−5 (23)	−14.2 (6.4)	−2.3 (27.9)
Record low °C (°F)	−42.0 (−43.6)	−41.1 (−42.0)	−35 (−31)	−22.8 (−9.0)	−10.0 (14.0)	−3.0 (26.6)	−1.0 (30.2)	−1.0 (30.2)	−7.0 (19.4)	−15.0 (5.0)	−22.0 (−7.6)	−38.0 (−36.4)	−42.0 (−43.6)
Average precipitation mm (inches)	95.4 (3.76)	77.0 (3.03)	67.0 (2.64)	75.3 (2.96)	98.5 (3.88)	105.8 (4.17)	97.5 (3.84)	109.7 (4.32)	107.7 (4.24)	105.2 (4.14)	102.2 (4.02)	88.8 (3.50)	1,130 (44.49)
Average rainfall mm (inches)	25.5 (1.00)	22.0 (0.87)	30.1 (1.19)	60.2 (2.37)	97.2 (3.83)	105.8 (4.17)	97.5 (3.84)	109.7 (4.32)	107.5 (4.23)	101.0 (3.98)	71.4 (2.81)	22.6 (0.89)	850.5 (33.48)
Average snowfall cm (inches)	69.9 (27.5)	55.0 (21.7)	36.9 (14.5)	15.2 (6.0)	1.3 (0.5)	0.0 (0.0)	0.0 (0.0)	0.0 (0.0)	0.2 (0.1)	4.2 (1.7)	30.8 (12.1)	66.2 (26.1)	279.6 (110.1)
Source: Environment Canada based on the Saint-Donat weather station

== Demographics ==
Historical census populations – Lac-Supérieur

Year	Pop.	±%
1891	669	—
1901	1,283	+91.8%
1911	1,467	+14.3%
1921	1,482	+1.0%
1931	1,211	−18.3%
1941	1,197	−1.2%
1951	1,175	−1.8%

Year	Pop.	±%
1956	1,093	−7.0%
1961	386	−64.7%
1966	346	−10.4%
1971	394	+13.9%
1976	481	+22.1%
1981	709	+47.4%
1986	852	+20.2%

Year	Pop.	±%
1991	952	+11.7%
1996	1,199	+25.9%
2001	1,439	+20.0%
2006	1,745	+21.3%
2011	1,892	+8.4%
2016	1,888	−0.2%
2021	1,972	+4.4%

Population counts are not adjusted for boundary changes.
Source: Statistics Canada

Private dwellings occupied by usual residents (2021): 996 (total dwellings: 1,718)

Mother tongue (2021):

- English as first language: 5.6%
- French as first language: 91.1%
- English and French as first languages: 1.0%
- Other as first language: 2.0%

== Local government ==
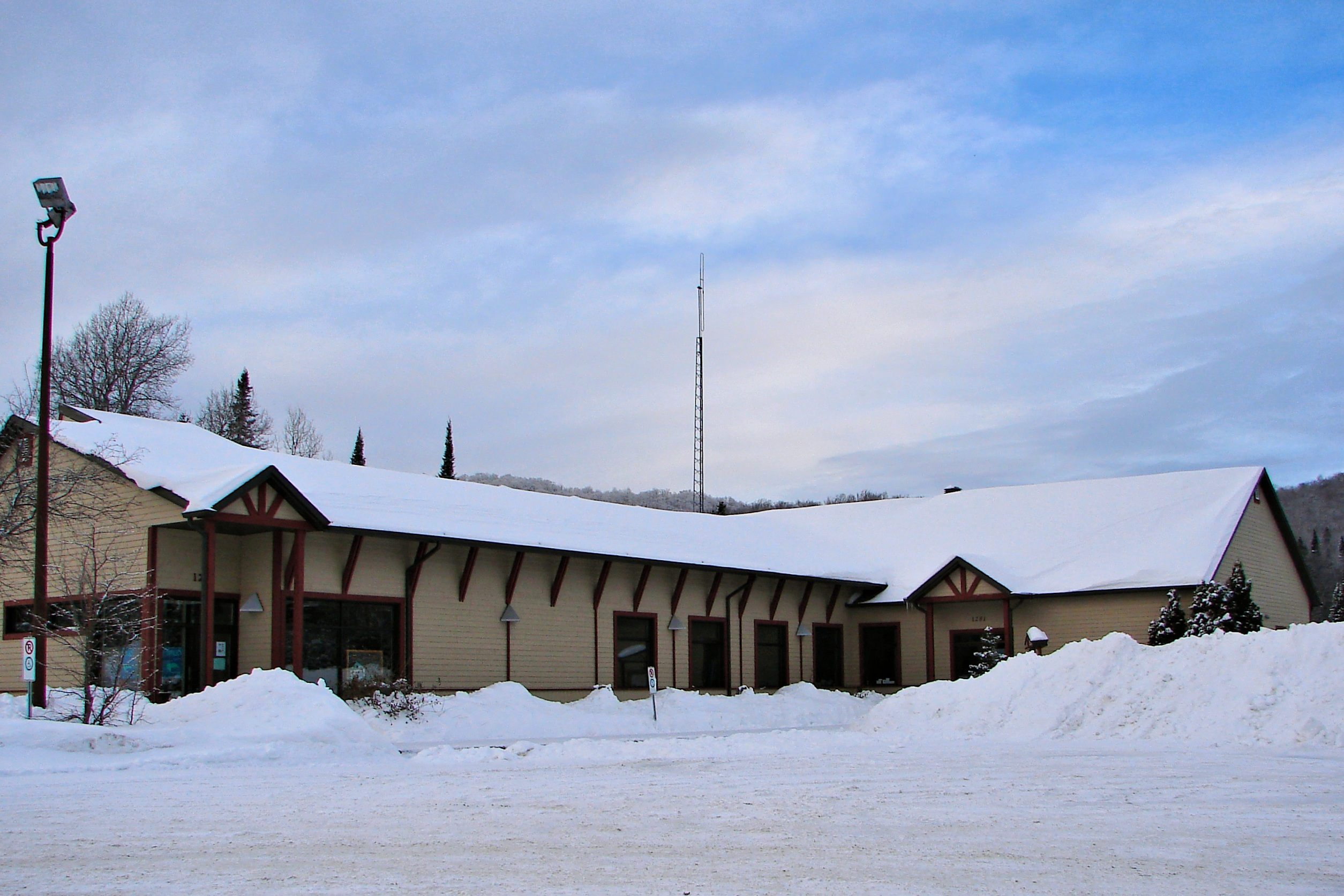
Lac-Superieur municipal building

List of former mayors:

- François Asselin (1881–1884, 1890–1902)
- Pierre Vanier (1884–1890)
- Calixte Forget (1902–1903)
- Manésippe Laurence (1903–1905)
- Pierre Bélanger (1905–1908, 1908–1910)
- F. R. Asselin (1908)
- Frédéric Sigouin (1910–1915, 1921–1933)
- Adjuteur Hébert (1915–1921)
- Cléophas Levert (1933–1937, 1939–1945)
- Alfred Daigle (1937–1939)
- Patrick Desjardins (1945)
- Théodore Legault (1945–1952, 1953–1955)
- Eddy Whelan (1952–1953)
- Léo Boivin (1955–1957)
- Onésime Grenier (1957–1961)
- Omer Racine (1961–1965)
- Jules Lauzon (1965–1979)
- Bernard Campeau (1979–1985, 1993–1997)
- André Desjardins (1985–1993)
- Monique Grenier (1997–2005)
- Gaétan Imbeau (2005–2009)
- Daniele Lagarde (2009–2013)
- Danielle St-Laurent (2013–2017)
- Steve Perreault (2017–present)

== Education ==
Sainte Agathe Academy (of the Sir Wilfrid Laurier School Board) in Sainte-Agathe-des-Monts serves English-speaking students in this community for both elementary and secondary levels.
