= Allioux Lake =

Lake in Capitale-Nationale, Quebec, Canada

- Location within Quebec
- Location: Lac-Jacques-Cartier, La Côte-de-Beaupré Regional County Municipality, Capitale-Nationale, Quebec, Canada
- Coordinates: 47°27′09″N 70°55′47″W
- Primary inflows: (Clockwise from the mouth) Stream (coming from the east), stream (coming from the south), stream (coming from the northeast), stream (coming from the northeast) which constitutes the outlet of Lac Stagnant.
- Primary outflows: Green stream
- Basin countries: Canada
- Max. length: 4.3 km (2.7 mi)
- Max. width: 1.6 km (0.99 mi)
- Surface elevation: 863 m (2,831 ft)

The lac Allioux is a freshwater body located northeast in of Quebec City, in the unorganized territory of Lac-Jacques-Cartier, in the La Côte-de-Beaupré Regional County Municipality, in the administrative region of Capitale-Nationale, in the province of Quebec, in Canada. This body of water is part of the Laurentides Wildlife Reserve.

The hydrographic side of Lac Allioux is served by a secondary forest road for forestry purposes. Forestry is the main economic activity in this valley; recreational tourism, second.

Because of the altitude, the surface of Lake Allioux is generally frozen from the end of November to the beginning of April; however, safe circulation on the ice is generally done from the beginning of December until the beginning of April.

== Geography ==
Lac Allioux is located near the southeastern limit of the Laurentides Wildlife Reserve. Lac Allioux du Nord is surrounded by mountains whose summits of proximity reach 1,056 metres (3,465 ft) in the east, 1,101 metres (3,612 ft) in the west and 1,001 metres (3,284 ft) to the northeast. Its mouth is located at:

- 2.8 kilometres (1.7 mi) west of Savane Lake (Lac-Pikauba) which empties north into the rivière Savane du Nord;
- 6.6 kilometres (4.1 mi) north-east of the course of the Rivière des Neiges;
- 46.8 kilometres (29.1 mi) north of the confluence of the Sainte-Anne River and the St. Lawrence River;
- 30.6 kilometres (19.0 mi) southwest of downtown Baie-Saint-Paul.

Lac Allioux has a length of 4.3 kilometres (2.7 mi) with a strongly indented periphery, a maximum width of 1.6 kilometres (0.99 mi) and an altitude of 863 metres (2,831 ft). This lake is mainly fed by two streams (coming from the east), a stream coming from the south, a stream (coming from the west) and the discharge of a set of lakes including Mornay, Sifrine, MacLeod and Petit lac MacLeod.

From the mouth of Lac Allioux, the current first descends on 8.9 kilometres (5.5 mi) towards the north by the Green stream which crosses Lake Bignell (length: 1.1 kilometres (0.68 mi); altitude: 847 metres (2,779 ft)); on 4.2 kilometres (2.6 mi) towards the south-east following the course of an unidentified stream; on 54.1 kilometres (33.6 mi) first towards the south-east, the south, then the south-west, following the course of the Sainte-Anne River, which crosses downtown Beaupré, to the northwest shore of the St. Lawrence River.

== Toponymy ==
Since 1929, this body of water has been locally designated "Lac Vert" on geographic maps. In 1943, the Commission de géographie du Québec assigned it the designation "Lac Allioux". This toponym evokes Vincent Allioux (Vannes, France, 1698 - 1735) who came to New France around 1721. He taught hydrography at the Collège de Québec until 1729; then returned to France to study theology. He returned to Quebec in 1734 as a Jesuit priest. Recalled in France for family reasons, he left the Company of Jesus in 1735. The Jesuits had been teaching hydrography since 1671, but it was not until 1708 that they were officially commissioned by the king.

The toponym "Lac Allioux" was formalized on December 5, 1968, at the Place Names Bank of the Commission de toponymie du Québec.

== See also ==
=== Related article ===
- Charlevoix Regional County Municipality
- Lac-Jacques-Cartier, an unorganized territory
- Laurentides Wildlife Reserve
- Sainte-Anne River (Beaupré)
- St. Lawrence River
