= Petit Lac Saint-François (Saint-François-Xavier-de-Brompton) =

Lake in Saint-François-Xavier-de-Brompton, Quebec, Canada

- Location within Quebec
- Location: Saint-François-Xavier-de-Brompton, Quebec, Canada
- Coordinates: 45.53695°N 72.03667°W
- Basin countries: Canada

Petit Lac Saint-François or Lake Tomcod is a lake in the municipality of Saint-François-Xavier-de-Brompton, in regional county municipality (MRC) of Le Val-Saint-François, in the administrative region of Estrie, Quebec, Canada. Cyanobacteria (blue-green algae) are present in the lake.

== Geography ==
This lake borders the east side of the village of Saint-François-Xavier-de-Brompton. It is located south of route 249 and west of highway 55.

== Toponymy ==
The toponym "Petit lac Saint-François" was made official on December 5, 1968, at the Commission de toponymie du Québec.
