= Forêt-la-Blanche Ecological Reserve =

Ecological Reserve in Québec, Canada

- IUCN category Ia (strict nature reserve)
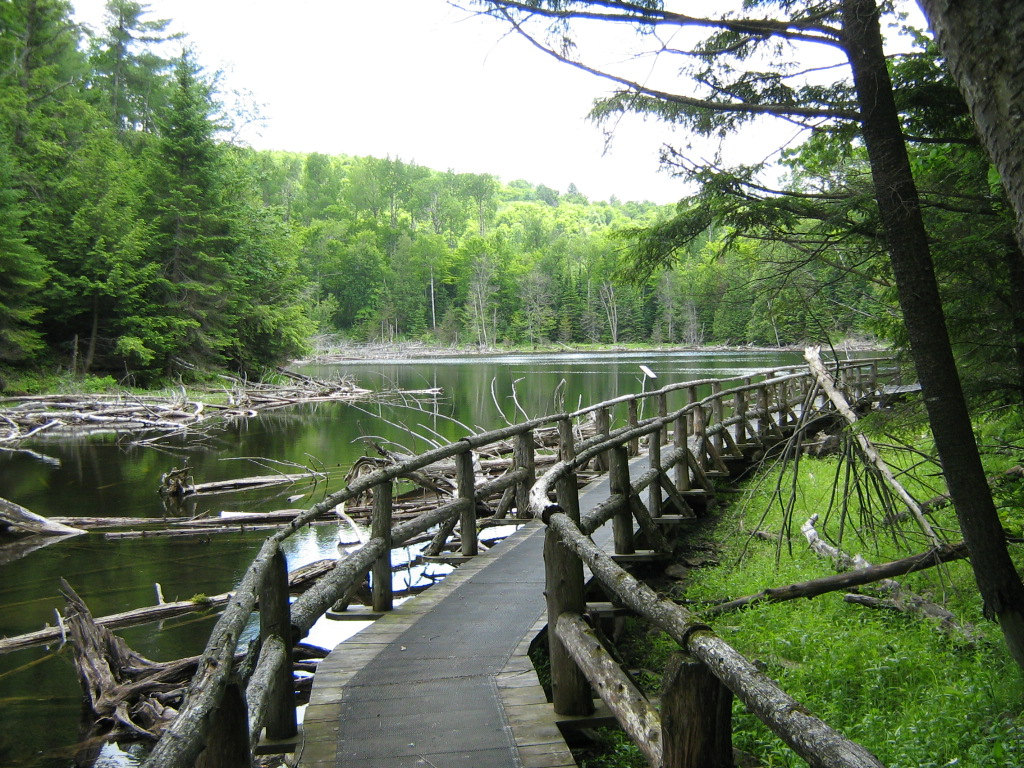
- Forêt-la-Blanche Ecological Reserve
- Interactive map of Forêt-la-Blanche Ecological Reserve
- Location: Mayo / Mulgrave-et-Derry / Saint-Sixte, Papineau RCM, Quebec, Canada
- Coordinates: 45.7314°N 75.28°W
- Area: 2,057.52 ha (5,084.2 acres)
- Established: October 8, 2003
- Website: www.foretlablanche.org

Forêt-la-Blanche Ecological Reserve is an ecological reserve in Quebec, Canada. It was established on October 8, 2003.

The reserve is notable for its exceptional forest ecosystem, that include stands of mature trees that never been affected by human activity and have suffered very little natural disturbance (e.g. natural decline, windfall, fires).

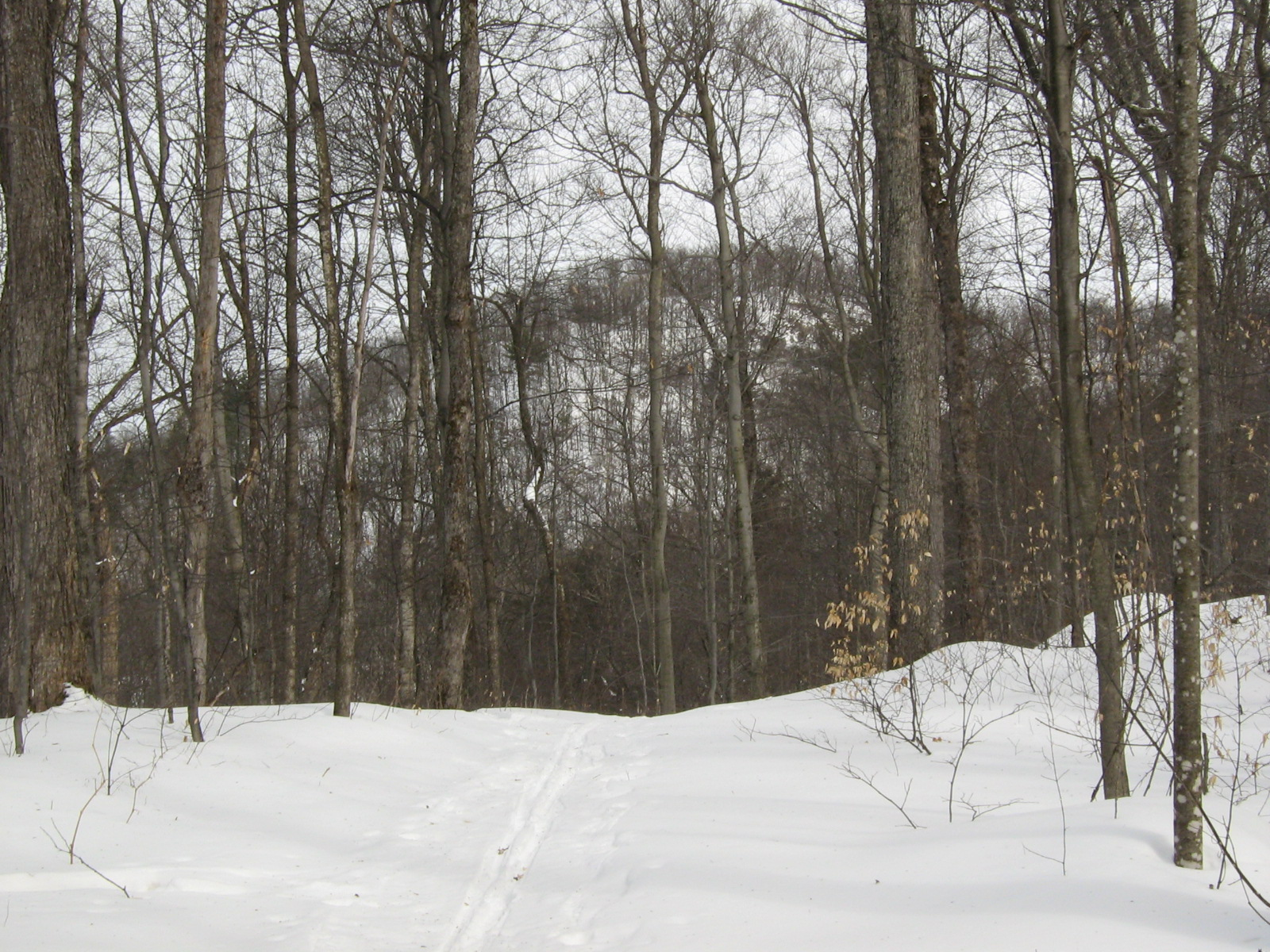

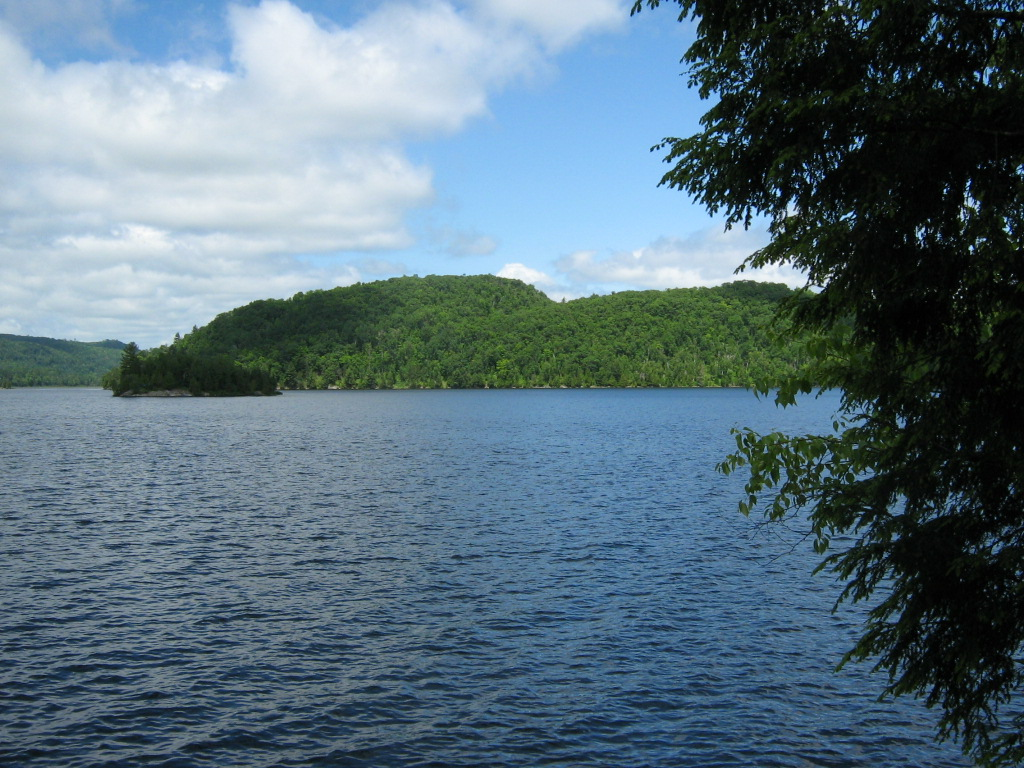
