= Lake Verneuil =

Lake in Quebec, Canada

- Location within Quebec
- Location: Baie-James, Quebec
- Coordinates: 49°32′52″N 74°31′08″W
- Basin countries: Canada

Lake Verneuil is a lake in northern Quebec, Canada.

Lac Verneuil lies at an elevation of 366 metres above sea level.
