= Paradise Lake (Quebec) =

Lake in Quebec, Canada

Lac Paradis
- Location within Quebec
- Location: Quebec
- Coordinates: 49.247536°N 78.034183°W
- Basin countries: Canada

Paradise Lake (Lac Paradis) is an emerald-green lake near Matagami in Quebec, Canada.

The lake is located on the east side of Quebec Route 109 as it runs from Amos to Matagami, 134 km north of Amos. It is labelled on some maps as "Lac Mandjoci" (the word Mandjoci means a monster in Algonquin). The unusual green colour of the water is caused by copper ores in suspension, and has led to the lake being described as an "exceptional natural site".

The Motel Paradis used to stand between the road and the lake, together with an information panel entitled "What gives the emerald water its colour". By the beginning of 2010 visitors reported the hotel to be abandoned and described it as "creepy". It was destroyed by fire in late October 2010. A Télébec emergency phone still stands between the road and the lake (June 2013).
