= Lac du Fou =

Lake in Saint-Roch-de-Mékinac, Quebec, Canada

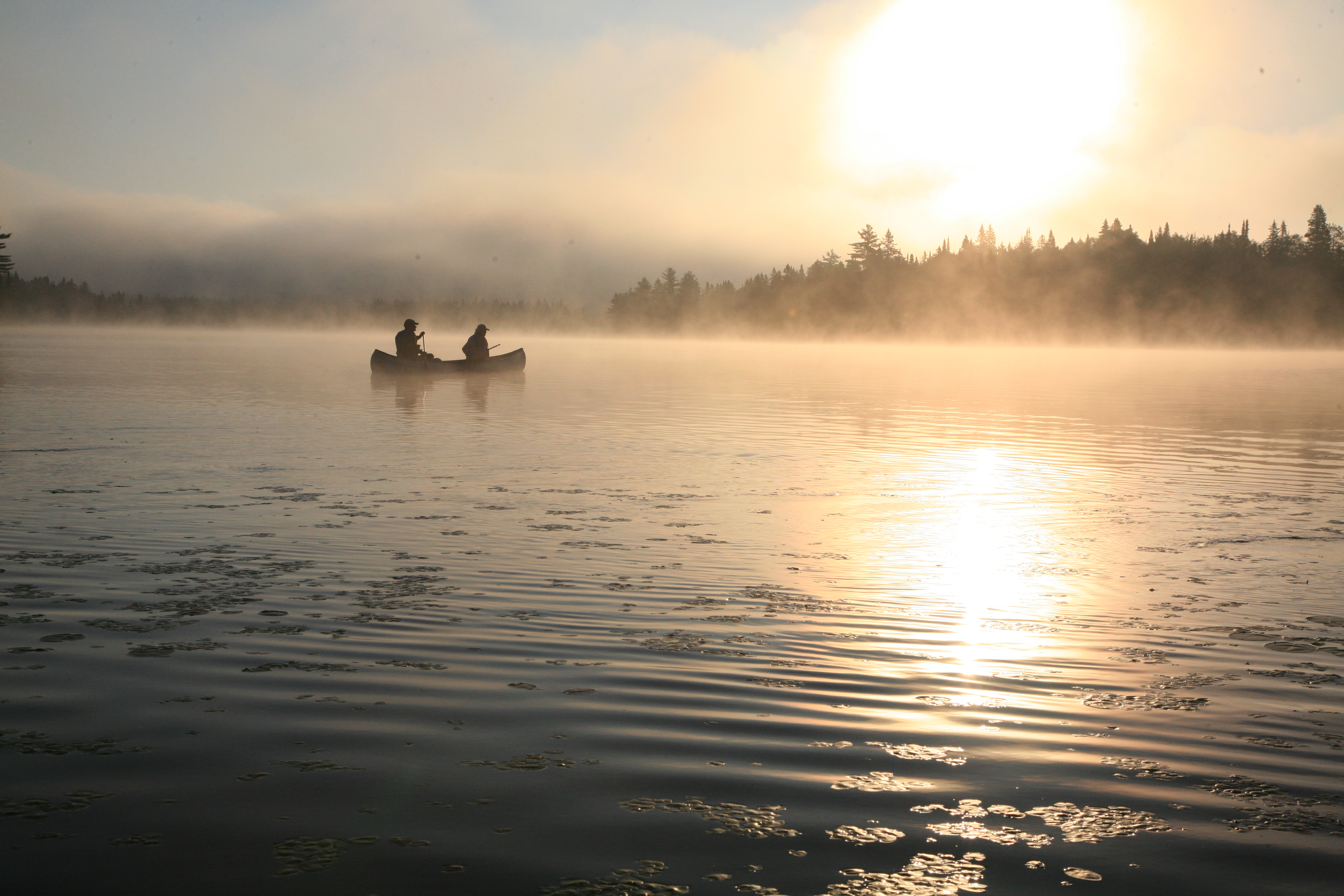

- Location within Quebec
- Location: Quebec in Canada
- Coordinates: 46°46′49″N 72°52′57″W
- Lake type: natural
- Primary outflows: Saint-Maurice River
- Basin countries: Canada
- Max. length: 2.4 km (1.5 mi)

The lac du Fou (lake crazy) is located in the municipality of Saint-Roch-de-Mékinac, in La Mauricie National Park, in the region Mauricie, in Quebec, in Canada. Located west of the Saint-Maurice River, this lake is surrounded by forest and is mainly used for outdoor activities by visitors of La Mauricie National Park.

== Geography ==
This lake supplies including the outlet of Lake Hamel, located north-east, and Lake Dion, located to the west. The mouth of the lake (Lac du Fou), located southeast of the lake empties into the "stream of crazy" which has a total length of 8.8 km (measured by water). It flows eastward across the lake Satchel, then Cutaway lake. From the mouth of the latest lake, creek runs 7 km (measured with water) before emptying into the Saint-Maurice River in Grandes-Piles and Saint-Roch-de-Mékinac.

The lake is 3.2 km long (measured by water) or 2.4 km (measured in a straight line). The lake is located 5.8 km (direct line) west of Saint-Maurice River.

The route of row 1 (eastbound) passes south of the lake.

== Name ==
This lake has a complex shape (in three parts) and appears very serpentine to some, "as if it were designed by a crazy artist practicing abstract style."

== See also ==
- Lac de la tourbière (Lake Bog)
- Lake Gabet
- Lake Wapizagonke
- Laurentien Trail
- La Mauricie National Park
- Mekinac Regional County Municipality
- Saint-Roch-de-Mékinac
