= Lake Wabano =

Lake in Quebec, Canada

Wabano Lake
- Location within Quebec
- Location: Quebec
- Coordinates: 47°15′14″N 73°24′23″W
- Type: Natural
- Basin countries: Canada

Wabano Lake is located in La Tuque, in administrative region of Mauricie in the province of Quebec, in Canada. This lake is located in forest area.

== Toponymy ==
The toponym "Wabano Lake" was recorded on July 4, 1980 in the "Bank of place names" of Commission de toponymie du Québec.
