= Taylor Lake (Quebec) =

- Location within Quebec Location within Canada
- Location: Gatineau Park
- Coordinates: 45°36′15″N 76°02′58″W
- Type: lake

Taylor Lake is a small lake in Gatineau Park area of Quebec, Canada. It is one of the park's smaller lakes. It is located mostly in the municipality of La Pêche and partly in Pontiac, both in Les Collines-de-l'Outaouais Regional County Municipality, Quebec.
