= Lake Lovering =

Lake in Quebec, Canada

- Lac Lovering (French)
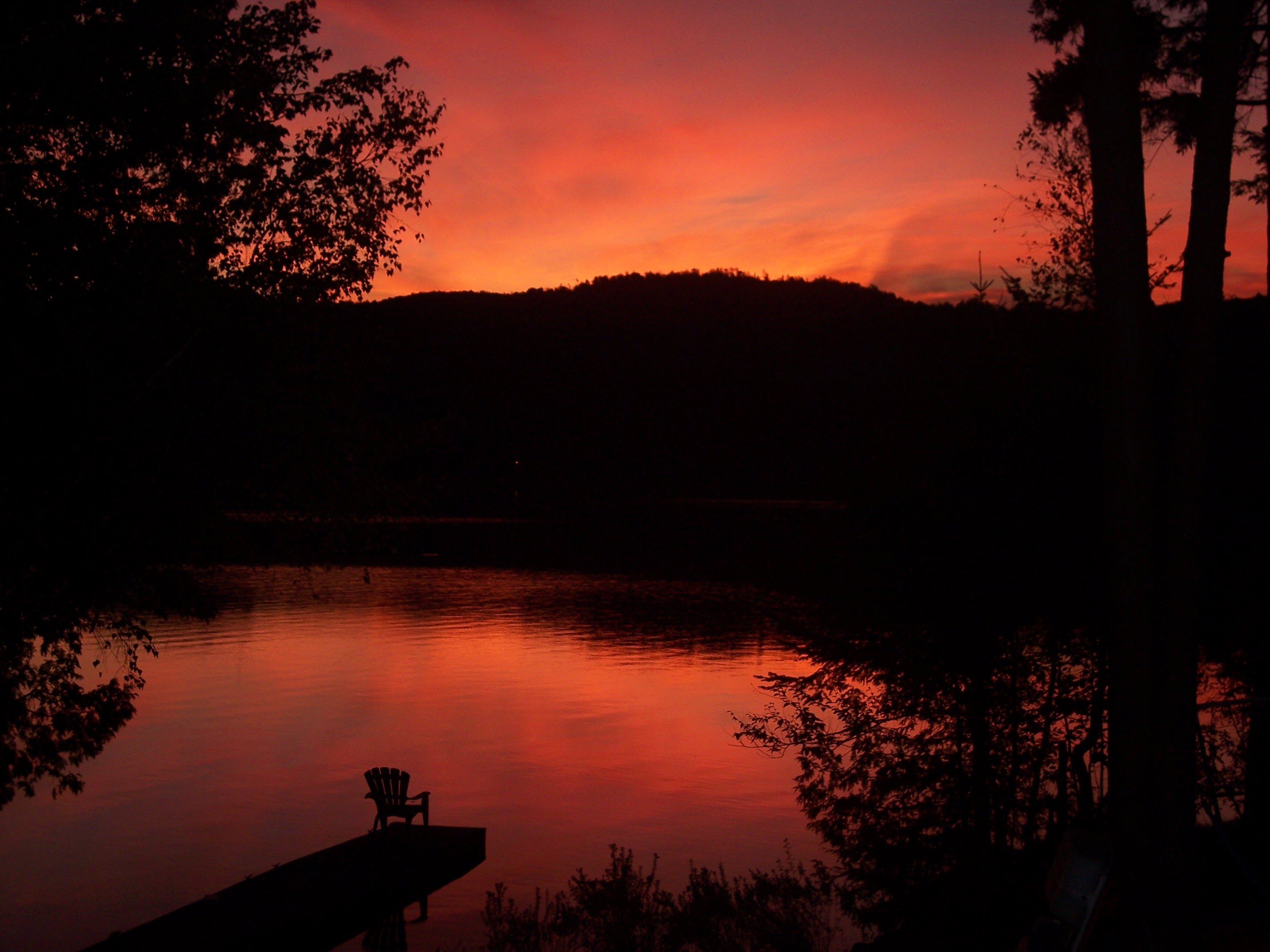
- Sunrise at Lake Lovering

- Location within Quebec
- Location: Memphrémagog Regional County Municipality, Estrie, Quebec
- Coordinates: 45°10′24″N 72°09′00″W
- Basin countries: Canada
- Max. length: 6 km (3.7 mi)
- Max. width: 0.75 km (0.47 mi)
- Surface area: 4.6 km^{2} (1.8 sq mi)
- Average depth: 25 m (82 ft)
- Surface elevation: 243 m (797 ft)

Lake Lovering (French: Lac Lovering) is a lake located in the Memphrémagog Regional County Municipality of the Estrie region of Quebec, Canada. It is located south of the city of Magog.

Lake Lovering is 6 kilometres (3.7 mi) long by 0.75 kilometres (0.47 mi) wide. It has a surface area of 4.6 square kilometres (1.8 sq mi) and an average depth of 25 metres (82 ft). It is situated at an elevation of 243 metres (797 ft).

In 1970 concerned landowners created an organization, la Société de conservation du lac Lovering, in response to the consequences of rapid residential urbanization of the lake shore. Its goal is to raise awareness of the hazards to the lake to local residents and authorities.
