= Eastmain Reservoir =

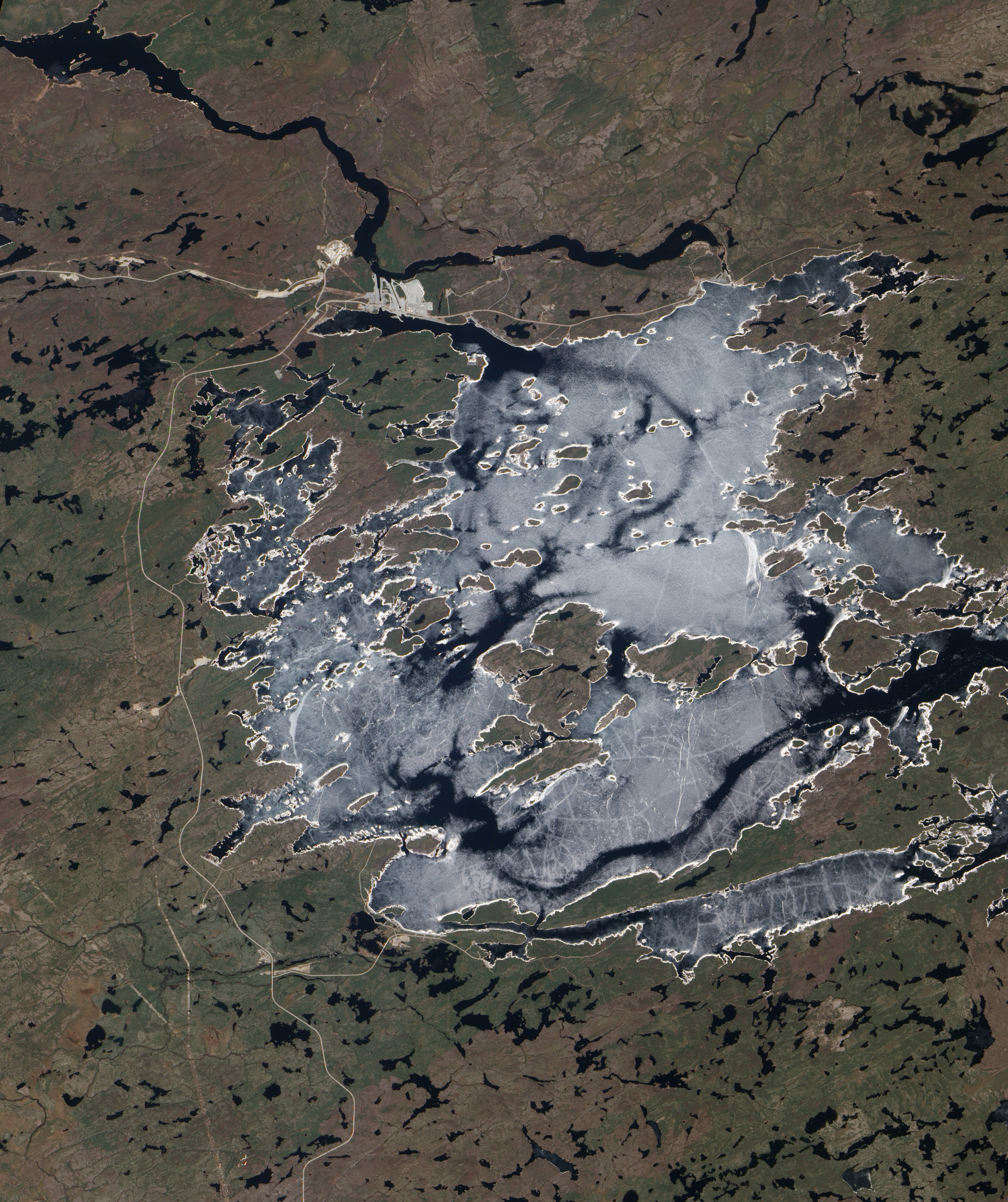
- Wide-area view of the Eastmain Reservoir

- Location within Quebec
- Location: Quebec
- Coordinates: 52°10′54″N 75°52′26″W
- Type: Reservoir
- Basin countries: Canada

Location within Canada

The Eastmain Reservoir is a reservoir which lies about 800 kilometres north of Montreal. The reservoir is part of the Eastmain-1-A/Sarcelle/Rupert Project which is designed to increase hydroelectric power for the Canadian province. Some of the structures along this reservoir include the Eastmain-1 power house and the Bernard-Landry power house. Eastmain-1 has three water turbines that can collectively generate as much as 480 megawatts of power. Meanwhile, HydroQuébec explains that Bernard-Landry is intended to supplement its slightly older neighbor. Bernard-Landry can generate up to 768 megawatts.
