= List of reservoirs by volume =

The classification of a reservoir by volume is not as straightforward as it may seem. As the name implies, water is held in reserve by a reservoir so it can serve a purpose. For example, in Thailand, reservoirs tend to store water from the wet season to prevent flooding, then release it during the dry season for farmers to grow rice. For this type of reservoir, almost the entire volume of the reservoir functions for the purpose it was built. Hydroelectric power generation, on the other hand, requires many dams to build up a large volume before operation can begin. For this type of reservoir only a small portion of the water held behind the dam is useful. Therefore, knowing the purpose for which a reservoir has been constructed, and knowing how much water can be used for that purpose, helps determine how much water is in possible reserve.

== Terminology ==
The following terms are used in connection with the volume of reservoirs:

Nominal volume
Capacity
The total volume of all water held behind a dam at the maximum level possible.
Initial volume
Design volume
The possible volume within the reservoir after it first opens. Many rivers are high in silt that over time deposits behind a dam reducing capacity.
Active volume
Live volume
The total capacity minus the dead pool volume. This is the volume that can serve some downstream purpose. For example, it is the volume available to make hydroelectric power or provide drinking water to a city.
Dead pool volume
Minimum volume
The amount of water left in a reservoir that cannot be used for the purpose for which the reservoir was constructed. At this state, the reservoir is termed fully drawn down. For example, if built to supply water in the dry season, it is the water left behind when no more water can be extracted. Frequently, the effective minimum volume is greater if the water is needed for a purpose behind a dam.
Available capacity
May require knowing the reservoir's primary purpose. If it is designed to prevent flooding, it may be the volume of water that can be retained before reaching maximum or top water.
Actual
Current
When coupled with another term, reflects the fact the level behind the dam is not constant.

== Expanded versus artificial lakes ==
The list below largely ignores many natural lakes that have been augmented with the addition of a relatively minor dam. For example, a small dam, two hydroelectric plants, and locks on the outlet of Lake Superior make it possible to artificially control the lake level. Certainly, the great majority of the lake is natural. However, the control of water that can be held in reserve means a portion of the vast lake functions as a reservoir.

Recognition of lakes like Lake Superior greatly changes the list below. For example, the Francis H. Clergue Generating Station and Saint Marys Falls Hydropower Plant, which are both on the lake's outlet, operate with just 5.9 meters total head. This is short compared to other dams. However, when viewed against the 81,200 km2 area of the lake, even a small range in Lake Superior's water level means its active volume is greater than the largest nominal in the table below.

== List ==
Rank	Reservoir	Dam	River	Country	Year	Nominal volume km^{3}	Ref.
1	Lake Kariba	Kariba Dam	Zambezi River	Zambia and Zimbabwe	1959	180.6	, 160.3
2	Bratsk Reservoir	Bratsk Dam	Angara River	Russia	1964	169	, 169.3
3	Lake Volta	Akosombo Dam	Volta River	Ghana	1965	150	, 148
4	Manicouagan Reservoir	Daniel-Johnson Dam	Manicouagan River	Canada	1968	141.85	, 141.7
5	Guri Reservoir	Guri Dam	Caroní River	Venezuela	1986	135	
6	Lake Nasser	Aswan High Dam	Nile River	Egypt and Sudan	1971	132	
7	Nigat Lake	Grand Ethiopian Renaissance Dam	Blue Nile River	Ethiopia	2023	79	
8	Williston Lake	W. A. C. Bennett Dam	Peace River	Canada	1967	74.3	
9	Krasnoyarsk Reservoir	Krasnoyarsk Dam	Yenisei River	Russia	1967	73.3	
10	Zeya Reservoir	Zeya Hydroelectric Station (ru)	Zeya River	Russia	1978	68.4	
11	Robert-Bourassa Reservoir	Robert-Bourassa generating station	La Grande River	Canada	1981	61.71	
12	La Grande-3 Nord Reservoir	La Grande-3 generating station	La Grande River	Canada	1981	60.02	
13	Ust-Ilimsk Reservoir	Ust-Ilimsk Dam	Angara River	Russia	1977	59.3	
14	Boguchany Reservoir	Boguchany Dam	Angara River	Russia	2012	58.2	
15	Kuybyshev Reservoir	Zhiguli Hydroelectric Station	Volga River	Russia	1955	58	
16	Cahora Bassa	Cahora Bassa Dam	Zambezi River	Mozambique	1974	55.8	
17	Serra da Mesa Reservoir	Serra da Mesa Dam	Tocantins River	Brazil	1998	54.4	
18	Caniapiscau Reservoir	Brisay generating station	Caniapiscau River	Canada	1981	53.8	
19		Pati–Chapetón (proposal)	Paraná River	Argentina	?	53.7	
20	Bukhtarma Reservoir	Bukhtarma Hydroelectric Power Plant	Irtysh River	Kazakhstan	1967	53	
21	Danjiangkou Reservoir	Danjiangkou Dam	Han River (Yangtze River tributary)	China	1962	51.6	
22	Atatürk Reservoir	Atatürk Dam	Euphrates	Turkey	1992	48.7	
23	Irkutsk Reservoir	Irkutsk Dam	Angara River	Russia	1956	46	
24	Lago Tucuruí	Tucuruí Dam	Tocantins River	Brazil	1984	45.54	
25	Los Barreales Lake	Loma de la Lata Dam (Cerros Colorados Complex)	Neuquén River	Argentina	1973	27.7	
26	Mari Menuco reservoir	Planicie Banderita hydroelectric power plant (Cerros Colorados Complex)	Neuquén River	Argentina	1979	13.8	
27	Three Gorges Reservoir	Three Gorges Dam	Yangtze River	China	2009	39.3	
28	Lake Mead	Hoover Dam	Colorado River	United States	1936	37.3	
30	Roseires Reservoir	Roseires Dam	Blue Nile	Sudan	1966	36.3	
31	Vilyuy Reservoir (ru)	Vilyuy Dam (ru)	Vilyuy River	Russia	1967	35.9	
32	Lake Powell	Glen Canyon Dam	Colorado River	United States	1964	35.55	
33	Lake Argyle	Lake Argyle Dam	Ord River	Australia	1971	35	
34	Nechako Reservoir	Kenney Dam	Nechako–Kemano	Canada	1966	35	
35	Sobradinho Reservoir	Sobradinho Dam	São Francisco River	Brazil	1979	34.1	
36	Smallwood Reservoir	Churchill Falls	Churchill River	Canada	1971	32.64	
37		Jenpeg Dam	Lake Winnipeg outlet	Canada	1975	31.79	
38	Keban Dam Lake	Keban Dam	Euphrates	Turkey	1971	31.5	
39	Volgograd Reservoir	Volga Hydroelectric Station	Volga River	Russia	1958	31.5	
40	Sayano-Shushenskoye Reservoir (ru)	Sayano-Shushenskaya Dam	Yenisei River	Russia	1990	31.3	
41	Lake Sakakawea	Garrison Dam	Missouri River	United States	1953	30.22	
42	Lake Kossou	Kossou Dam	Bandama River	Ivory Coast	1961	30	
43		Iroquois Dam	St. Lawrence River	Canada	1958	29.96	
44	Lake Oahe	Oahe Dam	Missouri River	United States	1966	29.11	
45	Lake Itaipu (pt)	Itaipu Dam	Paraná River	Brazil and Paraguay	1983	29	
46	Rybinsk Reservoir	Rybinsk Dam	Volga River	Russia	1941-1947	25.4	
47	Fort Peck Lake	Fort Peck Dam	Missouri River	United States	1930	23.1	
47	La-Grande 4 Reservoir	La Grande-4 generating station	La Grande River	Canada	1984	19.5	
48	Kakhovka Reservoir	Kakhovka Dam	Dnieper River	Ukraine	1956	0 (Previously 18.2)	
49	Sanmenxia Reservoir	Sanmenxia Dam	Yellow River	China	1962	16.2	
50	Mingachevir reservoir	Mingachevir Dam	Kura River	Azerbaijan	1953	15.73	
51	Merowe Reservoir	Merowe Dam	Nile River	Sudan	2009	12.50	

== See also ==
- List of reservoirs by surface area
- List of conventional hydroelectric power stations
- List of largest reservoirs in the United States
