= Robert A. Boyd =

Robert A. Boyd CM OQ (June 21, 1918 – November 6, 2006) was a Canadian electric engineer and utility executive. He successfully led the construction of the first phase of the James Bay hydroelectric project, a large dam complex built in northern Quebec by Hydro-Québec during the 1970s and early 1980s.

== Early life and family ==
Born in Sherbrooke, Quebec in a working-class family to a Scot-Irish father and a French Canadian mother. Boyd graduated from École Polytechnique de Montréal in 1943.

== Career ==
Soon after finished school, Boyd joined the ranks of the newly created provincially owned utility Hydro-Québec, as the first French-speaking engineer ever hired by the company. He spent his 37-year career in different positions, reaching the top job in 1977.

In 1972, Quebec Premier Robert Bourassa asked Boyd to take the helm of the Société d'énergie de la Baie James, a Crown corporation tasked with the construction of the first phase of what was then called Le projet du siècle (The Project of the Century), a network of dams, reservoirs and three giant hydroelectric generating stations located in a remote area 1,000 kilometres (620 miles) north of Montreal. Stretching for 700 kilometres (435 miles) east of James Bay along the course of the La Grande River, the 10,000 MW public works project presented massive logistical challenges to the builders: roads and airstrips had to be built and towns for the 18,000 workers had to be set up deep into the Quebec Hinterland.

Boyd took over as president of Hydro-Québec on August 9, 1977, after the departure of financier Roland Giroux. During his 4-year tenure as president of the Crown Corporation, Boyd secured large bond issues with international banks to finish the construction project. On October 27, 1979, Boyd inaugurated, with Premier René Lévesque, the LG-2 generating station, a massive 5,616 MW underground powerhouse buried deep in the Canadian Shield.

Construction on Phase I of the James Bay Project was completed in 1984, when La Grande-3 and La Grande-4 generating stations came on-line further upstream.

== Honors and awards ==
In 1978, he received an honorary doctorate from Concordia University. Boyd was selected Construction's Man of the Year in 1981 by the Engineering News-Record for his work on the James Bay project.

== See also ==
- Hydro-Québec
- James Bay Energy
- Churchill Falls
