= La Grande =

La Grande may refer to:

- La Grande, Oregon, a city in Union County, Oregon, United States.
- La Grande River, a river in northwestern Quebec, Canada
- LaGrande Technology, the Intel technology
- La Grande-Motte, a commune in the Hérault département in Occitanie in southern France
