= La Grande-2-A generating station =

Hydroelectric power station in Quebec

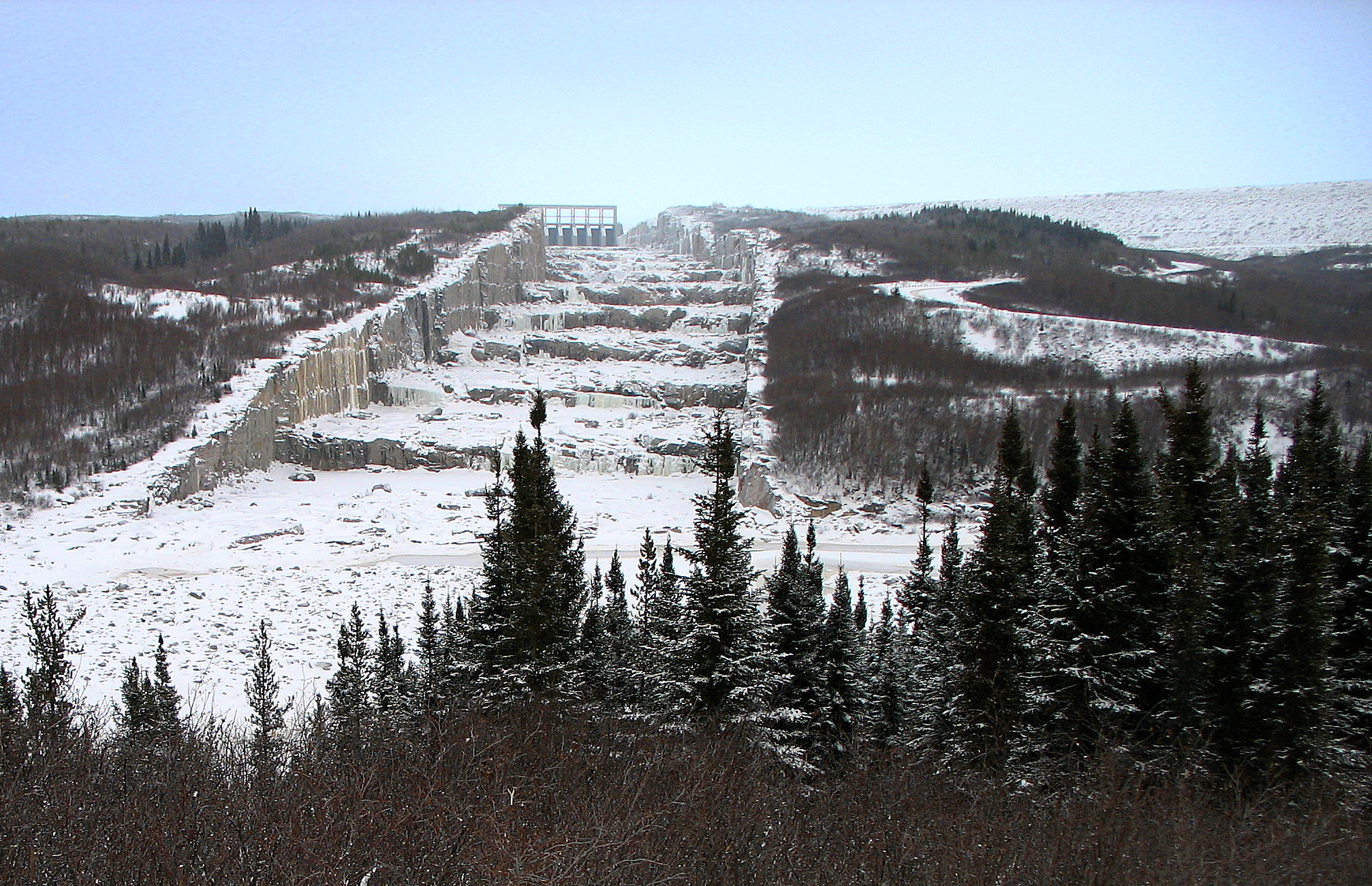
- Interactive map of La Grande-2-A generating station
- Official name: La Grande-2-A
- Location: Baie-James, Quebec, Canada
- Coordinates: 53°46′46″N 77°32′54″W
- Opening date: 1992
- Owner: Hydro-Québec

Dam and spillways
- Impounds: La Grande River
- Spillway capacity: 16,280 m^{3}/s (574,923 cu ft/s)

Reservoir
- Creates: Robert-Bourassa Reservoir
- Total capacity: 6,170,000,000 m^{3} (5,000,000 acre⋅ft)
- Surface area: 2,835 km^{2} (1,095 mi^{2})

Power Station
- Hydraulic head: 138.5 m (454 ft)
- Turbines: 6 × 351 MW (Francis turbine)
- Installed capacity: 2,106 MW
- Source: Hydro-Québec, The La Grande Complex visitor booklet, 2004, ISBN 2-550-41276-1

The La Grande-2-A is a hydroelectric power station on the La Grande River that is part of Hydro-Québec's James Bay Project. The station can generate 2,106 MW and was commissioned in 1991–1992. Together with the adjacent Robert-Bourassa generating station, it uses the reservoir and dam system of the Robert-Bourassa Reservoir to generate electricity.

== See also ==
- List of largest power stations in Canada
- Reservoirs and dams in Canada
