= Robert-Bourassa Reservoir =

Large reservoir in Quebec, Canada

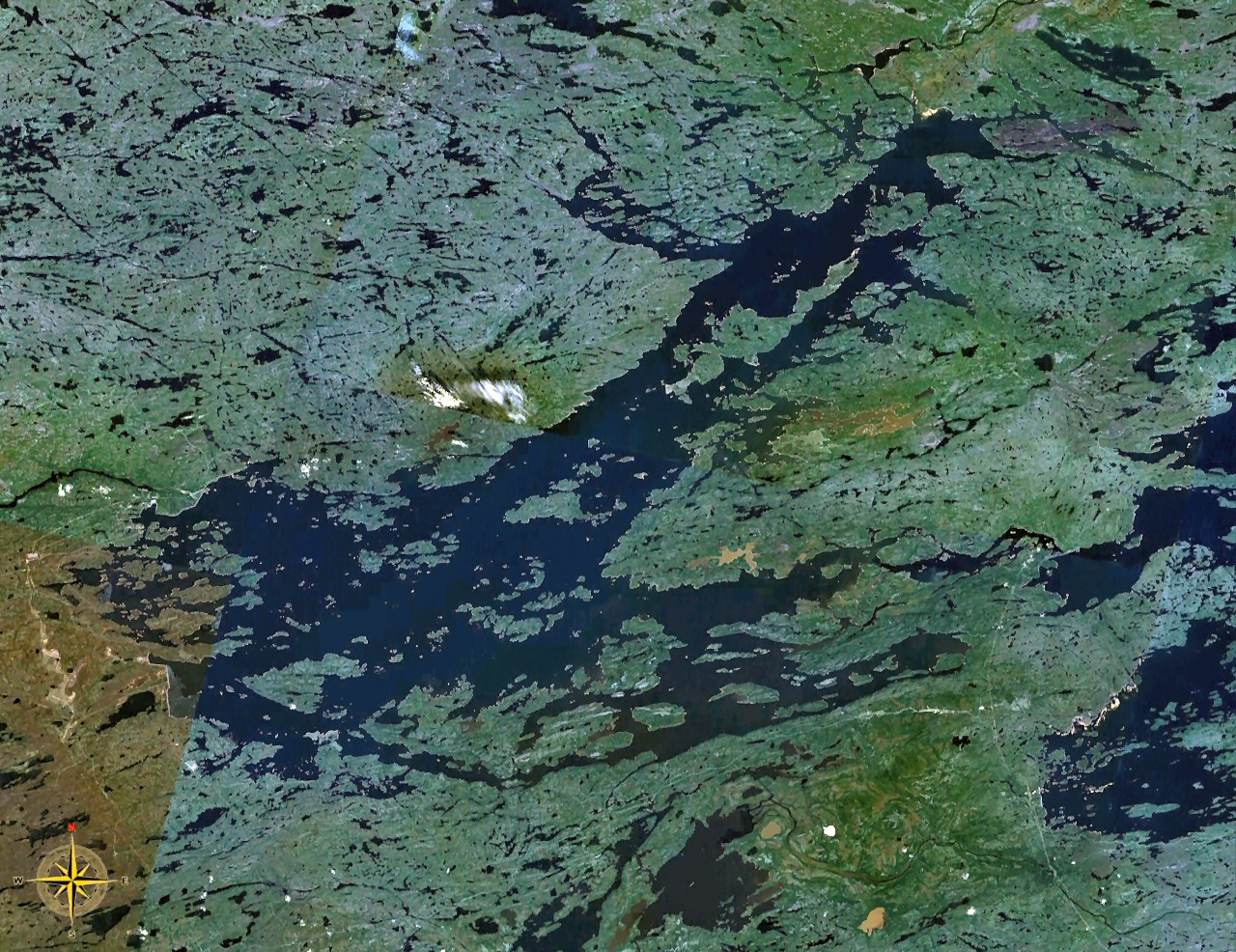

- Location in Quebec
- Location: Baie-James, Jamésie Territory, Quebec
- Coordinates: 53°45′N 77°00′W
- Lake type: Artificial
- Primary inflows: La Grande River
- Primary outflows: La Grande River
- Catchment area: 97,643 km^{2} (37,700 sq mi)
- Basin countries: Canada
- Surface area: 2,835 km^{2} (1,095 sq mi)
- Average depth: 21.8 m (72 ft)
- Max. depth: 137 m (449 ft)
- Water volume: 61.7 km^{3} (14.8 cu mi)
- Residence time: 0.5 years
- Shore length^{1}: 4,550 km (2,830 mi)
- Surface elevation: 175 m (574 ft)
- ^{1} Shore length is not a well-defined measure.

The Robert-Bourassa Reservoir (French: Réservoir Robert-Bourassa) is a man-made lake in northern Quebec, Canada. It was created in the mid-1970s as part of the James Bay Project and provides the needed water for the Robert-Bourassa and La Grande-2-A generating stations. It has a maximum surface area of 2,835 square kilometres (1,095 sq mi), and a surface elevation between 168 metres (551 ft) and 175 metres (574 ft). The reservoir has an estimated volume of 61.7 cubic kilometres (14.8 cu mi), of which 19.4 cubic kilometres (4.7 cu mi) is available for hydro-electric power generation.

The reservoir is formed behind the Robert-Bourassa Dam that was built across a valley of the La Grande River. This dam was constructed from 1974 to 1978, is 550 m (1,800 ft) wide at its base, and has 23 million m^{3} (30 million yd^{3}) of fill. There are another 31 smaller dikes keeping the water inside the reservoir.

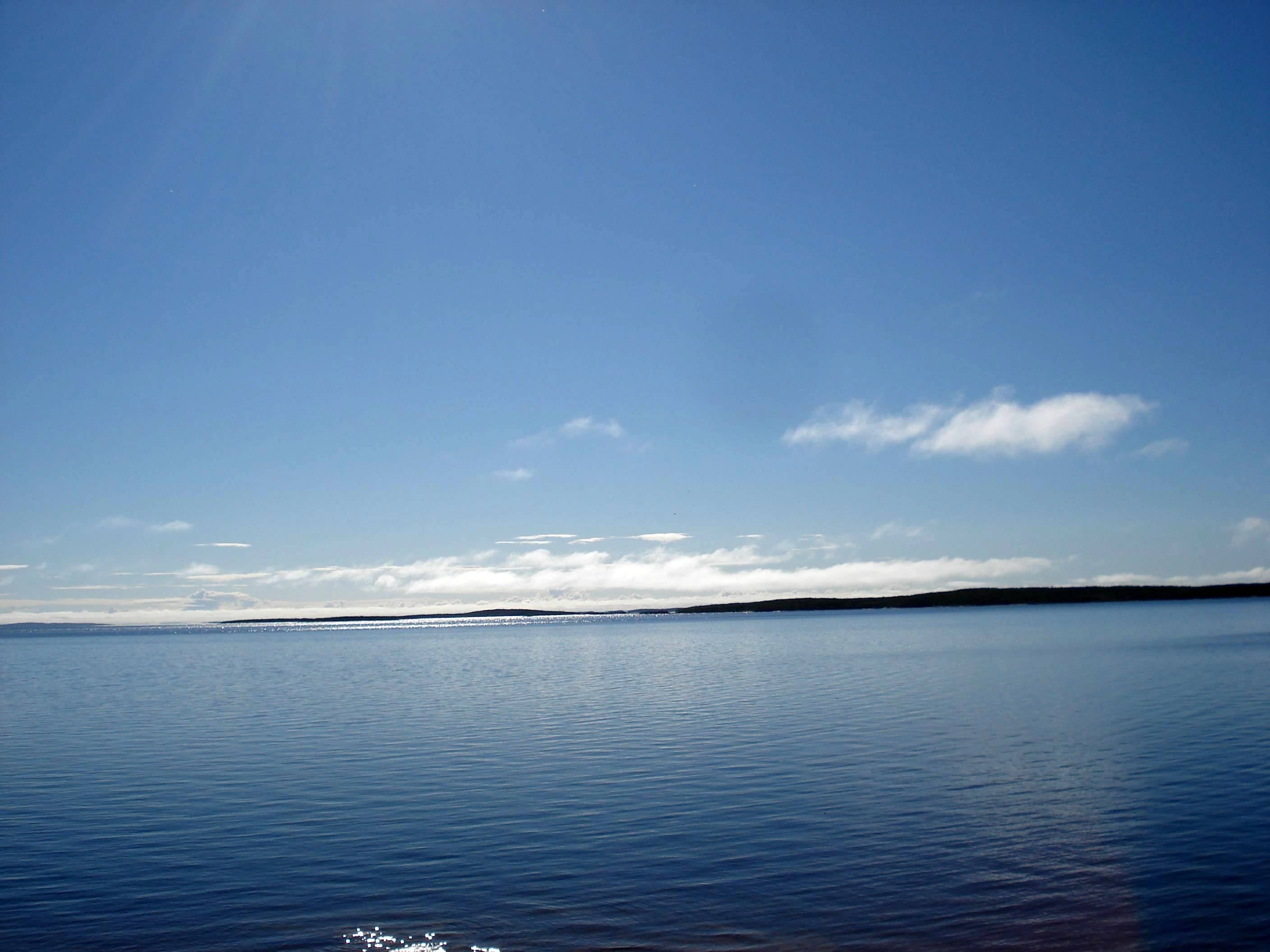
Robert-Bourassa reservoir near the Robert-Bourassa generating station.

== See also ==
- List of lakes of Quebec
