= Laforge-2 generating station =

Hydroelectric power station in Quebec

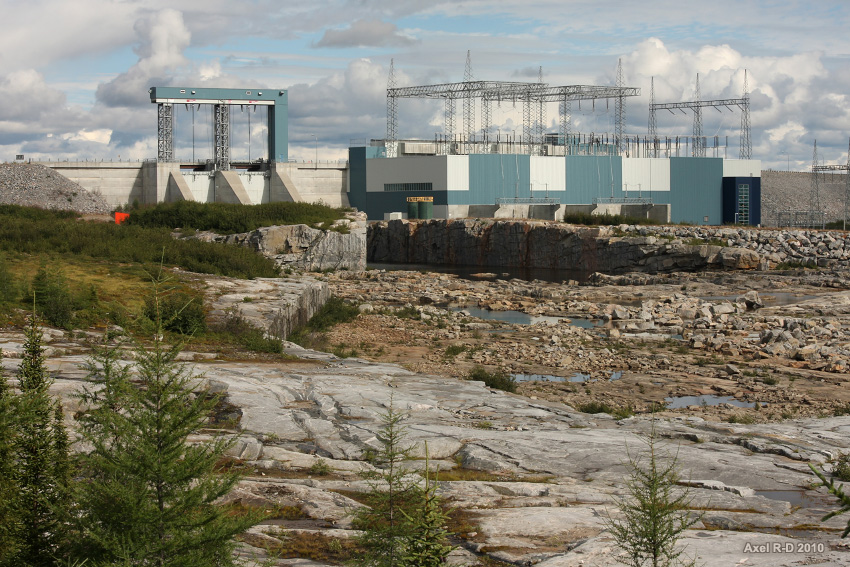
- Interactive map of Laforge-2 generating station
- Official name: Centrale Laforge-2
- Location: Baie-James, Quebec, Canada
- Coordinates: 54°35′20″N 71°16′50″W
- Opening date: 1996
- Owner: Hydro-Québec

Dam and spillways
- Impounds: Laforge River
- Spillway capacity: 2,350 m^{3}/s (82,989 cu ft/s)

Reservoir
- Creates: Laforge-2 Reservoir
- Surface area: 260 km^{2} (100 mi^{2})

Power Station
- Hydraulic head: 27.4 m (90 ft)
- Turbines: 2 × 159.5 MW (Kaplan turbine)
- Installed capacity: 319 MW
- Hydro-Québec, The La Grande Complex visitor booklet, 2004, ISBN 2-550-41276-1

The Laforge-2 is a hydroelectric generating station on the Laforge River, a tributary of the La Grande River, and is part of Hydro-Québec's James Bay Project. The station can generate 319 MW and was commissioned in 1996. It is considered a "run of the river" generating station since the Laforge-2 Reservoir is located much farther upstream. Together with La Grande-1, they are the only two generating stations of the James Bay Project that use a reservoir without any major water level fluctuations. Thus, the amount of electricity generated by the station depends almost entirely on the waterflow of the river, which is largely controlled by upstream reservoirs and generating stations.

== See also ==
- List of power stations in Canada
- Reservoirs and dams in Canada
