= James Bay Project =

Hydroelectric dams in Quebec, Canada

Coordinates: 53.777123°N 77.464600°W

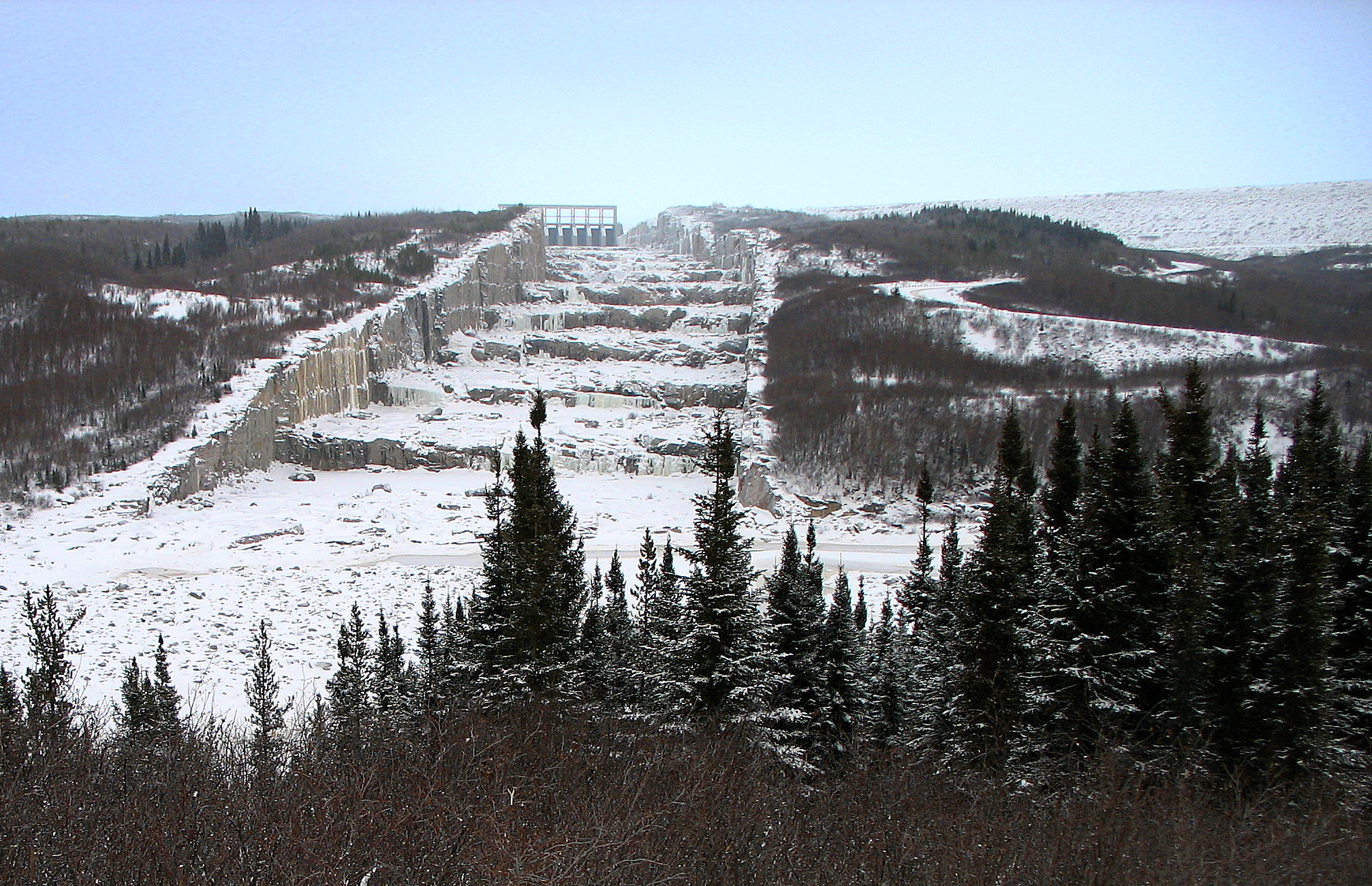
The spillway of the Robert-Bourassa Dam (formerly La Grande-2)

The James Bay Project (French: projet de la Baie-James) involves the construction of a series of hydroelectric power stations on the La Grande River in northwestern Quebec, Canada by state-owned utility Hydro-Québec, and the diversion of neighbouring rivers into the La Grande watershed. It is located between James Bay to the west and Labrador to the east, and its waters flow from the Laurentian Plateau of the Canadian Shield. The project is one of the largest hydroelectric systems in the world. It has cost upwards of US$20 billion to build and has an installed generating capacity of 15.244 GW, at the cost of 7,000 square miles of Cree hunting lands. It has been built since 1974 by James Bay Energy (SDBJ) for Hydro-Québec.

Construction costs of the project's first phase in ≈ 1971 amounted to $13.7 billion (1987 Canadian dollars). The eight power stations of the La Grande Complex generate an average of 9.5 GW, enough to meet the total demand of a small industrialized economy such as Belgium. The James Bay power stations represent almost half of Hydro-Québec's total output and capacity.

The development of the James Bay Project was controversial. It led to an acrimonious conflict with the 5,000 Crees and 4,000 Inuit of Northern Quebec over land rights, lifestyle and environmental issues. A ruling against the Quebec government in 1973 forced the Robert Bourassa government to negotiate a far-reaching agreement, the James Bay and Northern Quebec Agreement, involving the Cree, the Inuit, the Quebec and Canadian governments, Hydro-Québec, the SEBJ, and later the Naskapi First Nations. In the 1990s, forceful opposition by the Crees and their environmental allies caused the cancellation of the Great Whale Project, a proposed 3,000 MW complex north of La Grande River.

In February 2002, the Bernard Landry government and the Grand Council of the Crees signed the Peace of the Braves (French: Paix des Braves) and the Boumhounan Agreement, establishing a new relationship between Quebec and the Crees and agreeing on environmental rules for the construction of three new power stations built between 2003 and 2011 — the Eastmain-1, Eastmain-1-A and Sarcelle generating stations — and the diversion of the Rupert River.

== Geography ==
The James Bay region, also known as Jamésie, is a 350,000 km^{2} (135,136 sq mi) territory, bordered by the 49th and 55th parallels, James Bay on the western side and by the drainage divide with the Saint Lawrence River basin on the eastern side. The topography of the area consist of generally low relief areas and includes three parts: a 150 km (93 mi) coastal plain, a rolling plateau with a maximum elevation of 400 m (1,300 ft) and the Otish Mountains to the east of the territory, with peaks reaching 900 to 1,100 m (3,000 to 3,600 ft).

The area is part of the Canadian Shield and is largely made up of Precambrian igneous and metamorphic rocks. Relief has been eroded by successive glaciations in the Pleistocene era, as recently as 6,000 years ago, leaving depositions of loose materials: moraines, clay, silt and sand and reshaped the hydrography of the territory.

The region's climate is subarctic. Winters are long and last, on average, from October 22 to May 4. Summers are short and mild, with temperatures averaging 13.6 °C (56.5 °F) in July, while dropping to −22.9 °C (−9.2 °F) in January. Annual precipitation averages 765 mm (30.1 in), a third in snow. Highest monthly rainfall is registered in the summer and snow depths vary from 50 to 100 cm (20-40 in) in the winter. Precipitations are significantly lower than the annual average of 1,050 mm (41 in) recorded in Montreal. The area lies in the zone of discontinuous permafrost, whose depth is significantly reduced by the deep snow cover.

The natural seismicity of the area is low. An earthquake of magnitude 5 on the Richter magnitude scale occurred in 1941, its epicenter located approximately 150 km from the La Grande-3 generating station. However, episodes of induced seismicity occurred during the initial fill of reservoirs. In 1983, a magnitude 4 tremor was recorded 50 km (31 mi) upstream of LG-3's main dam.

Climate data for La Grande Riviere Airport (1991−2020 normals, extremes 1976–2020)
Month	Jan	Feb	Mar	Apr	May	Jun	Jul	Aug	Sep	Oct	Nov	Dec	Year
Record high humidex	3.0	4.8	12.0	21.8	33.9	38.0	44.3	35.5	31.6	28.3	13.4	7.6	44.3
Record high °C (°F)	3.3 (37.9)	5.0 (41.0)	11.8 (53.2)	22.3 (72.1)	32.6 (90.7)	35.0 (95.0)	37.3 (99.1)	31.2 (88.2)	28.3 (82.9)	23.5 (74.3)	12.3 (54.1)	7.4 (45.3)	37.3 (99.1)
Mean daily maximum °C (°F)	−17.2 (1.0)	−15.4 (4.3)	−7.9 (17.8)	0.5 (32.9)	10.1 (50.2)	18.1 (64.6)	20.7 (69.3)	18.8 (65.8)	12.9 (55.2)	5.5 (41.9)	−2.5 (27.5)	−10.8 (12.6)	2.7 (36.9)
Daily mean °C (°F)	−21.7 (−7.1)	−20.8 (−5.4)	−14 (7)	−5.1 (22.8)	4.3 (39.7)	11.5 (52.7)	14.8 (58.6)	13.6 (56.5)	8.6 (47.5)	2.4 (36.3)	−5.4 (22.3)	−14.5 (5.9)	−2.2 (28.0)
Mean daily minimum °C (°F)	−26.1 (−15.0)	−26.1 (−15.0)	−20.0 (−4.0)	−10.6 (12.9)	−1.6 (29.1)	4.9 (40.8)	8.8 (47.8)	8.3 (46.9)	4.3 (39.7)	−0.7 (30.7)	−8.3 (17.1)	−18.1 (−0.6)	−7.1 (19.2)
Record low °C (°F)	−40.9 (−41.6)	−44.6 (−48.3)	−39.7 (−39.5)	−31.4 (−24.5)	−22.6 (−8.7)	−6.6 (20.1)	−0.9 (30.4)	−0.5 (31.1)	−7.0 (19.4)	−16.7 (1.9)	−29.2 (−20.6)	−40.3 (−40.5)	−44.6 (−48.3)
Record low wind chill	−56	−56.9	−51.2	−40.1	−24.2	−12.5	−3.4	−6.5	−10.3	−19.7	−40.3	−52.9	−56.9
Average precipitation mm (inches)	31.0 (1.22)	22.2 (0.87)	27.9 (1.10)	29.2 (1.15)	43.8 (1.72)	61.7 (2.43)	85.6 (3.37)	89.7 (3.53)	110.3 (4.34)	88.5 (3.48)	68.1 (2.68)	43.9 (1.73)	701.9 (27.63)
Average rainfall mm (inches)	1.1 (0.04)	1.2 (0.05)	3.4 (0.13)	9.3 (0.37)	34.6 (1.36)	60.0 (2.36)	85.6 (3.37)	90.9 (3.58)	107.0 (4.21)	62.5 (2.46)	15.2 (0.60)	1.7 (0.07)	472.5 (18.60)
Average snowfall cm (inches)	30.4 (12.0)	21.6 (8.5)	24.7 (9.7)	19.9 (7.8)	9.5 (3.7)	2.3 (0.9)	0.0 (0.0)	0.0 (0.0)	3.4 (1.3)	26.4 (10.4)	54.5 (21.5)	43.0 (16.9)	235.7 (92.8)
Average precipitation days (≥ 0.2 mm)	16.6	11.7	11.4	10.5	13.1	11.7	15.2	15.8	20.1	20.7	22.3	20.1	189.1
Average rainy days (≥ 0.2 mm)	0.42	0.68	1.0	3.7	9.3	11.4	15.2	15.9	19.5	13.7	5.0	1.4	97.2
Average snowy days (≥ 0.2 cm)	16.5	11.6	10.8	8.5	5.7	1.2	0.04	0.0	1.5	10.5	20.3	19.8	106.4
Average relative humidity (%) (at 15:00 LST)	74.4	67.3	59.7	56.6	54.0	49.8	56.6	60.2	68.8	76.3	84.5	81.8	65.8
Mean monthly sunshine hours	76.5	114.0	167.2	197.7	226.6	256.3	247.0	204.5	102.8	69.7	37.8	35.5	1,735.5
Percentage possible sunshine	30.6	41.3	45.5	47.1	46.0	50.4	48.3	44.5	26.9	21.2	14.6	15.1	36.0
Source: Environment Canada (sun 1981–2010)

Climate data for La Grande IV
Month	Jan	Feb	Mar	Apr	May	Jun	Jul	Aug	Sep	Oct	Nov	Dec	Year
Mean daily maximum °C (°F)	−18.1 (−0.6)	−17.5 (0.5)	−8.0 (17.6)	1.3 (34.3)	9.8 (49.6)	17.0 (62.6)	20.0 (68.0)	18.2 (64.8)	11.0 (51.8)	3.7 (38.7)	−4.3 (24.3)	−13.2 (8.2)	1.7 (35.0)
Daily mean °C (°F)	−24.6 (−12.3)	−24.4 (−11.9)	−15.7 (3.7)	−5.1 (22.8)	3.5 (38.3)	10.2 (50.4)	13.6 (56.5)	12.4 (54.3)	6.8 (44.2)	0.5 (32.9)	−8.3 (17.1)	−18.9 (−2.0)	−4.2 (24.5)
Mean daily minimum °C (°F)	−31.1 (−24.0)	−31.3 (−24.3)	−23.4 (−10.1)	−11.5 (11.3)	−2.7 (27.1)	3.3 (37.9)	7.1 (44.8)	6.5 (43.7)	2.5 (36.5)	−2.8 (27.0)	−12.4 (9.7)	−24.6 (−12.3)	−10.0 (13.9)
Average precipitation mm (inches)	30 (1.2)	26 (1.0)	28 (1.1)	38 (1.5)	55 (2.2)	80 (3.1)	98 (3.9)	101 (4.0)	133 (5.2)	88 (3.5)	61 (2.4)	44 (1.7)	782 (30.8)
Average rainfall mm (inches)	0 (0)	0 (0)	2 (0.1)	16 (0.6)	45 (1.8)	79 (3.1)	98 (3.9)	101 (4.0)	123 (4.8)	43 (1.7)	10 (0.4)	1 (0.0)	518 (20.4)
Average snowfall cm (inches)	35 (14)	28 (11)	29 (11)	23 (9.1)	10 (3.9)	1 (0.4)	0 (0)	0 (0)	9 (3.5)	46 (18)	58 (23)	53 (21)	292 (114.9)
Mean monthly sunshine hours	84	128	167	184	208	221	209	183	89	54	41	54	1,622
Source: The Weather Network.

== History ==
=== Exploration ===
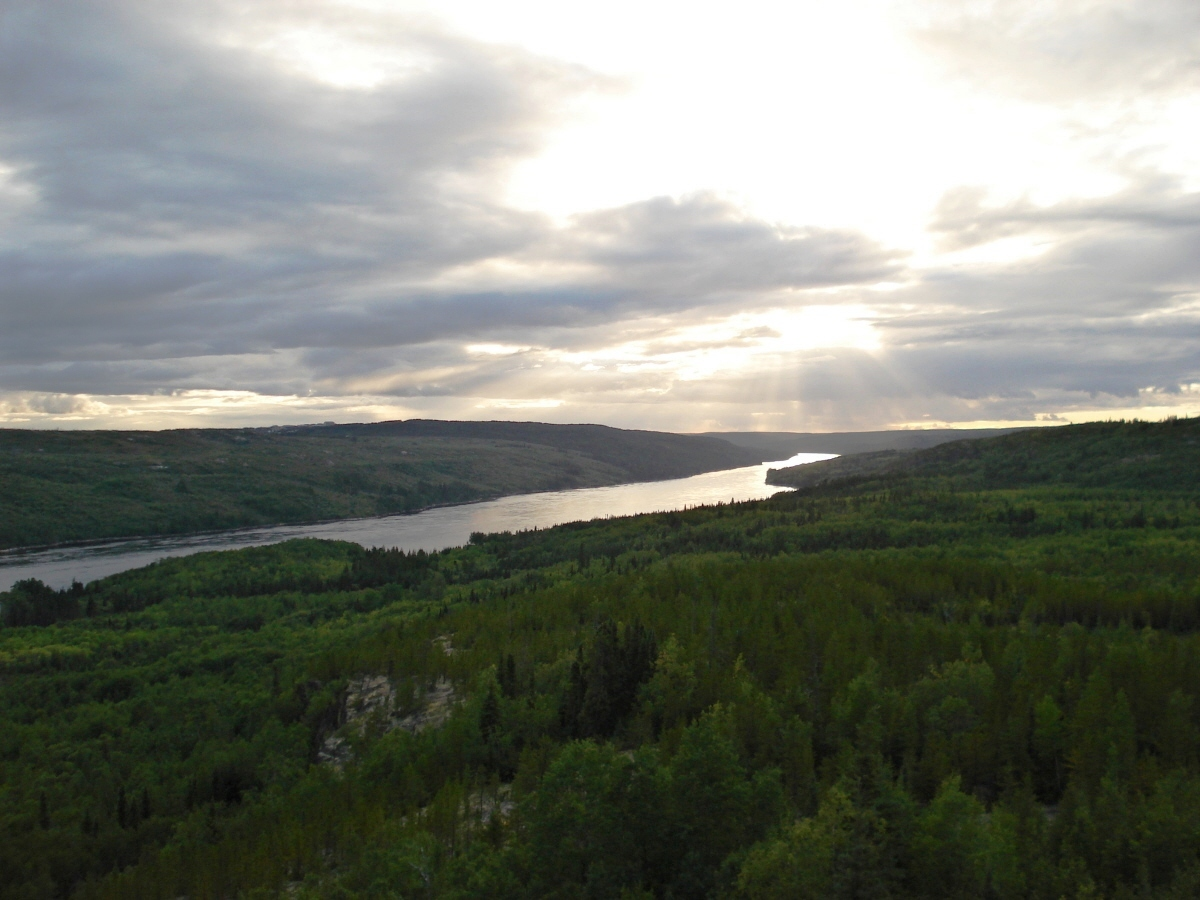
La Grande River, near Radisson, Quebec

Between 1950 and 1959, a team led by H. M. Finlayson conducted water surveys of the Nottaway, Broadback and Rupert Rivers—collectively known by the abbreviation NBR—on behalf of the Shawinigan Water & Power Company, a large investor-owned utility based in Shawinigan, Quebec. Among options studied by Shawinigan's engineers was the possible diversion of these rivers to the Saint-Maurice River watershed in order to increase output at the company's 8 power stations.

With the nationalization of privately owned utilities in 1963, Hydro-Québec inherited the preliminary studies conducted by Finlayson and his team on the hydroelectric potential of James Bay rivers. However, other projects, such as the Manicouagan-Outardes project on the North Shore and the possibility of building a large power station at Churchill Falls in Labrador proved easier and less expensive and the Crown corporation devoted only minimal resources to the vast potential of northern rivers. In 1965, Hydro-Québec survey program included exploration of the territory and hydrographic surveys of areas between the 52nd and 55th parallel.

In 1967, the company stepped up the work on the La Grande and Eastmain rivers. Dozens, then hundreds of people were sent by helicopter and seaplanes in inaccessible areas of the taiga to perform surveys and geological studies to identify potential sites for hydropower development. Faced with budget concerns, Hydro-Québec did cut back exploration budgets between 1968 and 1970, but the company maintained planning and analysis work, since early data showed a large potential for development.

=== Early steps ===
On December 16, 1969, Liberal Backbencher Member of the National Assembly Robert Bourassa met with the president of Hydro-Québec, Roland Giroux over lunch at the parliamentary dining room in Quebec City. After the meeting Bourassa, who was about to launch a leadership bid for the position left vacant by the resignation of former Premier Jean Lesage, became convinced of the probability and suitability of the project and made the development of James Bay hydroelectricity a major plank of its leadership campaign. Elected as the party leader in January, Bourassa went on to win the general election on April 29, 1970, and his tenure as Premier of Quebec became closely linked to hydroelectric development in general and with the James Bay project in particular.

For Bourassa the development of James Bay project addressed two of his priorities. In Energy in the North, an essay published in 1985, Bourassa, an economist by profession, argued that "Quebec's economic development relies on the development of its natural resources". Moreover, Bourassa argued his 1969 estimates showed demand for electricity would outstrip supply by 11,000 MW by 1983, concurring with forecasts made at the time by Hydro-Quebec.

Six months after his election, Bourassa began working on the details of the scheme with his adviser, financier Paul Desrochers. The two men met secretly with Roland Giroux and Robert A. Boyd for an update in September 1970 and the next month he travelled to New York City in the midst of the October Crisis to negotiate financing for the project, estimated at the time to cost between $5 billion and $6 billion.

Bourassa introduced his plan to the provincial cabinet in March 1971 and recommended hiring the US engineering firm Bechtel to oversee the construction. Liberal strategists then chose to make the announcement before a partisan crowd assembled at Quebec's Little Coliseum as part of the Liberal party gathering celebrating the first year of Bourassa's term, on April 30, 1971. According to journalists witnessing the scene, Bourassa's speech concluded on a scene of indescribable enthusiasm.

=== Nuclear lobby ===
The announcement quickly generated a public debate on the wisdom to engage the province on such a large-scale project. For several years, a lobby spearheaded by the Canadian government and its nuclear venture, Atomic Energy of Canada Limited, promoted the adoption of nuclear energy in Quebec, as a way to "share the benefits of Canada with our fellow francophone citizens", as Canadian Prime Minister Lester B. Pearson said. The lobby had its supporters within the ranks at Hydro-Québec, and has been vocal when the provincial government made the decision to invest in the Churchill Falls venture with Brinco. Several Parti Québécois spokesmen, including energy critic Guy Joron and economic adviser Jacques Parizeau voiced their opposition to the Bourassa scheme. In an interview with Montreal's Le Devoir, the former economist and public servant who later became premier of Quebec commented: "We don't have to dam every single river just because they're French Canadian and Catholic."

However, Bourassa himself and Hydro-Québec senior management — including President Roland Giroux and commissioners Yvon DeGuise and Robert Boyd — were firmly behind the large hydroelectric development to be built in northern Quebec. At the time Giroux, a financier, argued that large international investors "are still wary about nuclear energy. If we bring them a good hydroelectric project, and James Bay is a good one, they'll soon show where their preferences lie". As an engineer, Boyd expressed concerns at this early date about the uncertainty of nuclear energy. He recommended maintaining a certain expertise in the field but advocated delaying nuclear expansion as late as possible.

The Quebec premier received an unexpected backing when the Chairman of the Council of Ministers of the USSR, Alexei Kosygin visited Montreal in October 1971. Kosygin supported Bourassa's project and expressed concerns regarding his country's own nuclear power, explaining his country had to develop the technology because the USSR lacked suitable rivers to expand its own hydroelectric network of dams and power stations.

=== Options ===
Two options were considered when Bourassa unveiled his plan for the construction of several large hydroelectric power stations on the rivers flowing into James Bay, either on the Nottaway, Broadback, Rupert and Harricana Rivers in the south (NBR Project), or on the La Grande and Eastmain Rivers to the north. The northerly rivers were selected in May 1972, various studies conducted by engineering firms having concluded the La Grande option would be more cost effective, while having a lesser impact on forestry and would require less flooding, thus minimizing impacts on First Nations fishing and hunting. Another area of concern was the silty nature of the terrain in the NBR area, which would have complicated the damming.

The project, as described at the time, would involve the construction of four generating stations on the La Grande River and the diversion of the Eastmain and Caniapiscau rivers into the La Grande watershed. Responsibility for the project would be overseen by the Société d'énergie de la Baie-James, a newly created mixed corporation (public/private) controlled by Hydro-Québec, headed by Robert A. Boyd.

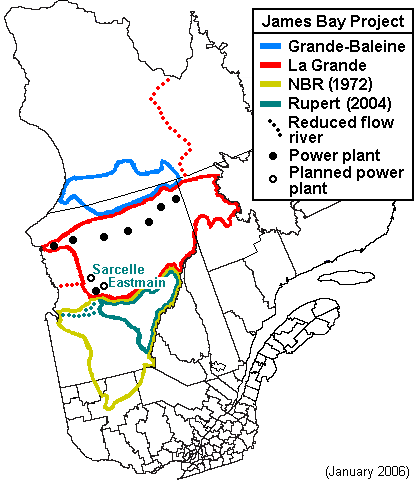
Affected watersheds

As environmental assessments were not then required under Quebec law, construction of the 700 kilometres (430 mi) James Bay Road to the La Grande River was begun in 1971 and completed by October 1974 at a cost of about $400 million. In 1973 and 1974, a temporary winter ice road was used to bring in the heavy equipment required for the construction of the roadbed and some 13 major bridges spanning the many rivers of the region.

Construction had boomed in Montreal for Expo 67, leading to an inflated workforce. In the following years, the decreased demand for labor meant that times were tough for the construction industry in Montreal. As Bourassa had promised in the 1970 election that his government would create 100,000 jobs in the construction industry, there was much violent competition between various construction unions to have their workers engaged in the James Bay Project. Canadian historian Desmond Morton noted that there were 540 different incidents between the two main construction unions in Quebec on sites associated with the James Bay Project between 1970 and 1974, many of them "very bloody". In the 1973 election, after the Fédération des travailleurs et travailleuses du Québec (FTQ) union had donated generously to the Parti libéral du Québec, Bourassa announced that only companies employing workers from the FTQ-affiliated Conseil des métiers de la construction headed by André "Dédé" Desjardins would work on the James Bay project. In March 1974, when one sub-contractor refused to fire two workers belonging to the rival CSN union, the FTQ workers destroyed the LG-2 site, causing $35 million in damage. On 21 March 1974, the workers on the LG-2 site rioted and used their bulldozers to destroy the site that they were working on while other workers set buildings afire.

In response to the riot at the LG-2 site, Bourassa created a royal commission headed by Judge Robert Cliche, the union official Guy Chevrette and a prominent Montreal labor lawyer Brian Mulroney to examine the question of freedom of expression within Quebec construction unions. The Cliche commission as it became known found widespread corruption within the construction unions as the columnist Peggy Curran wrote that the Cliche commission uncovered "...tales of nepotism, bribery, sabotage, blackmail and intimidation; charges of union organizers with criminal records who gave lessons in how to break legs; thugs-for-hire who would happily beat up a rival union organizer’s teenager or strangle their dog." Desjardins was called before the Cliche commission several times starting in November 1974, where it was established that he was closely associated with the Montreal Mafia, and engaged in thuggish practices as president of the Conseil des métiers de la construction union.

Although the Aboriginal Crees had traditional hunting and trapping areas in the region, no seasonal or permanent roads existed at the time. Opposition to the project, however, was strong among the 5,000 Crees of James Bay, the 3,500 Inuit to the north and several environmental groups. They believed the government of Quebec was acting in violation of treaties and committing unlawful expropriation and destruction of traditional hunting and trapping lands. Furthermore, the Cree and Inuit had not been informed of the hydroelectric project until after construction of the access road had begun. The federal Indian affairs minister Jean Chrétien intervened on the side of the Cree and the Inuit, hiring lawyers to argue their case in the courts. Both Bourassa and the Prime Minister, Pierre Trudeau were Liberals and federalists, but relations between the two were very strained at best as the French-Canadian nationalist Bourassa was a "soft federalist" who favored devolving the powers of the federal government down to the provinces while the Canadian nationalist Trudeau was a "hard federalist" who favored concentrating power in the hands of the federal government. Relations between Quebec City and Ottawa were brought to the breaking point in 1971 when Bourassa vetoed the Victoria charter for patriating the British North America Act to give Canada its own constitution on the grounds that if the British North American Act was going to be changed, then the federal government should cede more powers to the provinces. The willingness of the Trudeau government to intervene on the side of the Cree and Inuit against the Quebec government was at least in part caused by the feud between Bourassa and Trudeau.

In a speech championing the Cree, Chrétien said Bourassa "could go to hell", charging that he did not have the right to build on or flood the land claimed by the Cree. In 1973, the federal government's lawyers won a court injunction ordering the James Bay project stopped until a treaty could be signed with the Cree and Inuit, but an appeals court overturned the ruling days later. However, Bourassa agreed to negotiate with the First Nations as the federal government announced it was willing to take the matter to the Supreme Court. In later years, the Cree and Inuit were given a settlement of $150 million, negotiated by Cree chief Billy Diamond.

In November 1975, the governments of Canada and Quebec signed the James Bay and Northern Quebec Agreement with the Cree of the James Bay region and the Inuit of northern Quebec, affirming exclusive hunting and fishing rights to about 170,000 km^{2} of territory and about $250 million in financial compensation in return for the right to develop the hydroelectric resources of Northern Quebec. The planned La Grande-1 power station would be built about 50 km further away from the Cree village of Chisasibi than originally planned. The Agreement also provided for an extensive environmental follow-up of all aspects of the hydroelectric development on the La Grande and Eastmain rivers and the establishment of a joint environmental assessment process for any future hydroelectric project involving other rivers of Northern Quebec.

== The project ==
=== Phase I ===
The period of construction of the first phase of the project covered about 14 years. By 1986, the largest power stations and reservoirs on the La Grande River were mostly completed, including the Robert-Bourassa (originally named La Grande-2), La Grande-3 and La Grande-4 generating stations, with an installed capacity of 10,800 MW, and five reservoirs covering an area of 11,300 km^{2}. The Eastmain and Caniapiscau river diversions each added about 800 m^{3}/s of water to the La Grande River. The power plants of the first phase of the James Bay Project produce about 65 TWh of power each year, operating at about 60% of their maximum rated generating capacity.

During this first phase of construction, over 155,000,000 cubic metres (203,000,000 cu yd) of fill, 138,000 tons of steel, 550,000 tons of cement, and nearly 70,000 tons of explosives were used. Concurrent employment by the project reached 18,000. Of the 215 dikes and dams, many surpassed the height of skyscrapers, with one reaching 56 stories. The terraced diversion channel at Robert-Bourassa generating station was carved 30 m (one hundred feet) deep into the side of a mountain. Water tumbles from the reservoir to the river below at a height greater than that of Niagara Falls. A 4,800 km (3,000 mi) network of transmission lines was necessary to bring generated power to consumers in southern Quebec. The network contains several 735-kilovolt lines and one 450-kilovolt DC line directly linked to the U.S. power grid.

=== Phase II ===
During the late 1980s and early 1990s, construction of the second phase of the James Bay project centred on the construction of five secondary power plants on the La Grande River and its tributaries (La Grande-1, La Grande-2A, Laforge-1, Laforge-2 and Brisay), adding a further 5,200 MW of generating capacity by the end of 1996. Premier Bourassa estimated that this phase would create 40,000 construction job-years (equivalent to 4,000 jobs lasting 10 years). Three new reservoirs covering an area of 1,600 km^{2} were created, including the Laforge-1 Reservoir covering 1,288 km^{2}. The generating plants of this second phase of the project produce about 18.9 TWh of power per year, operating at between 60% and 70% of their maximum rated generating capacity.

On March 13, 1989, a massive solar storm caused a failure of the La Grande complex, plunging most of Quebec into darkness for nine hours.

=== Great Whale River project ===
During the construction of the second phase of the James Bay Project, Hydro-Québec proposed an additional project on the Great Whale River (French: Grande rivière de la Baleine), just to the north of the La Grande River watershed. Opposition among the Cree was even more vocal this time than in the early 1970s. In 1990, Grand Chief Matthew Coon Come organized a canoe trip from Hudson Bay to the Hudson River, in Albany, New York, and this very effective public relations stunt brought international pressure to bear on the government of Quebec. The Cree had experienced considerable culture shock with the introduction of permanent transportation routes to the south and very few Cree were employed on the construction site. Poverty and social problems remained prevalent in the isolated Cree and Inuit villages of Northern Quebec, even in areas where there were no hydroelectric or mining activities.

By the 1980s, the natural ebb and flow of the La Grande, Eastmain and Caniapiscau rivers had been severely modified, notably delaying the formation of a solid ice cover near the Cree village of Chisasibi, and about 4% of the traditional hunting and trapping territories of the Cree had been lost to the rising waters of the reservoirs, including about 10% of the territories of the Cree village of Chisasibi. At the same time, new roads, snowmobiles and bush airlines facilitated access to distant hunting territories of the interior. While highly motivated, the Cree's opposition to the Great Whale River Project was mainly ineffective until 1992 when the State of New York withdrew from a multibillion-dollar power purchasing agreement due to public outcry and a decrease in energy requirements. In 1994, the Government of Quebec and Hydro-Québec suspended the project indefinitely.

=== Rupert River diversion ===
In 2002, the Quebec government and the Grand Council of the Crees signed a landmark agreement, "La Paix des Braves" (literally "The Peace of the Braves"), ensuring the completion of the last phase of the original James Bay Project: construction of the Eastmain-1 generating station, with a capacity of 480 MW, and the Eastmain Reservoir with a surface area of about 600 km^{2} (230 sq mi).

A subsequent agreement in April 2004 put an end to all litigation between the two parties and opened the way to a joint environmental assessment of the projected diversion of the Rupert River, to the south of the Eastmain River. The project entails the diversion of about 50% of the total water flow of the Rupert River (and 70% of the flow at the diversion point) towards the Eastmain Reservoir and into the La Grande Complex, and the construction of two additional generating stations: Eastmain-1A and Sarcelle, with a combined capacity of 888 MW. The Rupert diversion would generate a total of 8.5 TWh of electricity at the new and existing power stations.

Former Grand Chief of the Crees (Eeyou Istchee) Matthew Mukash (elected in late 2005 and served until 2009) opposed the Rupert River diversion and favoured the construction of wind turbines.

== Hydro-electric installations ==
The hydro-electric stations in the La Grande watershed are:

- La Grande-1 generating station
- Robert-Bourassa generating station (formerly La Grande-2)
- La Grande-2-A generating station
- La Grande-3 generating station
- La Grande-4 generating station
- Laforge-1 generating station
- Laforge-2 generating station
- Brisay generating station
- Eastmain-1 generating station
- Eastmain-1-A generating station
- Sarcelle generating station

== Environmental impacts ==
Although there was no environmental impact assessment legislation before the James Bay Project's initial construction phase in the 1970s, a major environmental research program was conducted before Phase I began.

The environmental impacts of the James Bay Project largely stem from the creation of a complex chain reservoir through the integration of all the watersheds of the eastern shores of the Hudson Bay, from the southern tip of James Bay to Ungava Bay in the north. This has had the consequence of diverting the flow of water from four major rivers into a large body of water, ultimately changing the dynamics of the land, an environmental political phenomenon labelled by some critics as a "first build, then paint green" policy.

=== Mercury pollution ===
Two of these main diverted rivers are the Caniapiscau River and the Eastmain River into which the James Bay Project submerged about 11,000 km^{2} of boreal forest (taiga). Consequently, the flooded vegetation's stored mercury (Hg) was released into the aquatic ecosystem, and due to the diversion of the water flow to contained reservoirs, the sudden abundance of mercury in the James Bay area in 1979 was unable to be dispersed and diluted as would have been the case in natural waters. Because the James Bay Cree (East Cree) live a mostly traditional lifestyle including a diet rich in fish and sea mammals, there is a possibility that the damming project has contributed to northern Quebec's Cree having the highest measured methyl-mercury concentration of all Canadian First Nations. Because of the simultaneous mercury contamination in James Bay from other activities in the area, including paper milling, the direct effect of the project on mercury levels has been difficult to ascertain. From 1981 to 1982, a few years after the flooding of La Grande River, mercury levels in lake whitefish (Coregonus clupeaformis) increased up to fourfold their pre-flooding levels, while those in northern pike (Esox lucius) rose up to sevenfold during the same period. In natural lakes, these concentrations are five to six times less than in the James Bay area. This rapid spike of mercury levels in two of the fish species used extensively by the area's Cree is attributed to the processes of bioaccumulation and biomagnification. Biaccumulation is the initial consequence of mercury pollution, as the toxin is first incorporated into the given ecosystem's producers. In the James Bay area ecosystem, mercury being released from the decaying flooded trees would be incorporated in trace amounts in zooplankton. Benthic organisms (benthos), the whitefish's primary prey, consume a great deal of zooplankton, causing the mercury concentration in a single organism to magnify due to accumulation of mercury and its inability to be excreted. In turn, whitefish, due to their greater size, consume large numbers of benthic invertebrates, thus incorporating the individual mercury accumulations of each organism and creating their own store of mercury. The effect is further exacerbated by humans consuming this built up store of mercury. The James Bay Mercury Agreement, signed in 1986 between the Grand Council of the Crees (of Québec), the Cree Regional Authority, the Cree Bands, the Government of Québec, Hydro-Québec and the Société d’énergie de la Baie James (James Bay Energy), aims "to restore and strengthen Cree fisheries [...] but [...] also adequately take into account the health risks associated with human exposure to mercury."

=== Local climate changes ===
The establishment of reservoirs containing large amounts of standing water has the ability to produce local climate changes. Alteration of annual precipitation patterns, increased abundance of low stratus clouds and fog, and warmer autumns and cooler springs, leading to a delay in the beginning and end of the growing season, have all been observed in the vicinity of the project's major reservoirs. The doubling of the freshwater input into James Bay during the winter decreases the salinity of the seawater, thereby increasing the freezing point of the bay. The resultant increased ice content at the northern section of the project in the winter has cooled warm air currents more than usual, bringing harsher Arctic weather, including strong winds and less precipitation, to south-central Quebec. The tree line at the southern edge of the development has shifted noticeably southward since the project's construction.

=== Water flow modifications ===
Following construction of the project, the area's water flow was substantially modified. In the James Bay area in general, the average monthly surface runoff rate in the winter increased by 52%, doubling the total freshwater input, while that of the summer months decreased by 6%. The James Bay area's water flow is most affected by the hydroelectric project from January to April because rivers have their lowest runoff rates in the winter months when freezing occurs. Additionally, runoff rates in the damming system can be altered to meet power needs, which are highest in the winter and lowest in the summer, thereby more completely reversing the natural water flow cycle. As evidenced by the 500% increase in its winter runoff, the La Grande River is the pillar of the James Bay project's hydroelectric capacity, with the runoff increasing from an average yearly amount of 1,700 m^{3}/s to 3,400 m^{3}/s, and from 500 m^{3}/s to 5,000 m^{3}/s in the winter. This immense harnessing of the area's energy at La Grande was made possible by reducing the Eastmain River's water flow at its mouth by 90% and by reducing that of the Caniaspiscau River's by 45%, and then by diverting these rivers into La Grande. Not only does this alter the runoff amount of the Eastmain and the Caniaspiscau Rivers, but also their drainage location, since prior to having been directly merged with La Grande, these rivers’ drainage locations were separate from the La Grande River. The summer runoff rate of La Grande increased by 40%, making the average annual runoff rate 91% greater than its natural rate.

Because of the change in the runoff rates of James Bay, massively increasing in the winter months, and increasing considerably in the summer as well, there has been more extreme fluctuation in the water levels. This has killed many trees along the shoreline, which are not equipped with deep enough root systems and tolerance of prolonged exposure to seawater to withstand these fluctuations. As well, the increased riverbank erosion downstream of the dams has washed the flora’s habitat down the river. The result has been considerable decay (decomposition) of dead trees along the shoreline, consequently releasing stored mercury into the area's terrestrial ecosystem through bioaccumulation in decomposers and detritovores and eventual biomagnification up the food web. This has left the area's Cree susceptible to mercury poisoning from both land and sea. Any shoreline plants that could potentially provide vegetation growth to replace any of the lost wetland habitats in these zones of periodic fluctuations are destroyed.

=== Changes in migration routes ===
Other changes in the delicate balance of the James Bay ecosystem can be illustrated through the animal migration patterns, salmon spawning, and destruction of wildlife habitats. The significant loss of wetlands and the blocking of passageways to those wetlands that remain has inhibited salmon spawning and migration in the James Bay area. Additionally, diverting rivers towards the James Bay could cause changes in the geographical pattern of river water discharge into the sea.[36]

Caribou populations, which have been expanding since the 1950s, have adopted migration routes throughout much of the Quebec-Labrador Peninsula and have thus been increasingly abundant in the James Bay area, the valley of the Caniapiscau, and around George River (Quebec).[37] Variations in the water flow of the Caniapiscau River from 1981 to 1984, during the period when the Caniapiscau Reservoir was being filled, may have contributed to the death by drowning of 10,000 migratory woodland caribou in September 1984, representing about 1.5% of the herd at that time. On the other hand, the reduced flow of the Caniapiscau River and the Koksoak River has permanently reduced the risk of natural floods on the lower Caniapiscau during the period of caribou migrations, giving hunters greater access to caribou than ever before. About 30,000 caribou are killed each year by Inuit, Cree and American and European hunters.

Seasonal reversal in the flow of rivers can potentially rob the rich nutrients that thrive in various mudflats and coastal marshes, affecting millions of migratory birds such as waterfowl, Canada geese, and various inland birds that use the coastlines of both the James and Hudson Bays during their spring and fall migrations.[38]

== Social impact ==
The James Bay and Northern Quebec Agreement provided considerable financial and administrative resources for the Cree and Inuit communities to deal with the environmental and social consequences of the project and provide for future economic development, such as the creation of the local airline Air Creebec. The James Bay Project also was an impetus for the forging of a collective identity among the Cree of Quebec and for the establishment of the Grand Council of the Crees (Eeyou Istchee). The Agreement notably provided for major institutional structures for local government, economic development, schools and health services, mostly under the control of the Grand Council of the Crees and the Kativik Regional Government, in Nunavik.

Yet, the social consequences of the hydroelectric project itself pale in comparison to the social impact of the Cree coming into direct contact with the society and economic forces of francophone Quebec. The greatest impact stems from the construction in the early 1970s of the James Bay Road (Route de la Baie James) from Matagami to the new town of Radisson, near the Robert-Bourassa generating station (La Grande-2), and on to the nearby Cree village of Chisasibi. During the main construction period of the late 1970s, Radisson housed a population several times greater than the Cree population of Chisasibi, although it currently has a population of about 500.

Nevertheless, the Cree communities have themselves continued the push to build additional roads from the James Bay Road westward to the Cree coastal villages of Wemindji, Eastmain and Waskaganish. These roads, opened between 1995 and 2001, have further facilitated access to hunting areas of the interior and encouraged commercial and social exchanges between the Cree villages and with southern Quebec. A separate road (Route du Nord) also links the James Bay Road to Chibougamau, via the Cree village of Nemaska. The building of these newer roads was largely the work of Cree construction companies.

The James Bay Road also opened the region to further mineral exploration and clear-cut logging in the southern James Bay area and substantially reduced the cost of transport. These activities have put further strains on the traditional hunting and trapping activities of the Cree in the southern James Bay region, notably the villages of Waskaganish and Nemaska. Such activities, however, only accounted for about half the economic activity of the Cree communities in 1970 and less than 20% by the late 1990s. Hunting and fishing in the Cree villages mostly involves young adults and older Cree with few professional qualifications. Such activities are furthermore sustained by an income replacement program financed by the government of Quebec that offers the equivalent of a modest annual salary for hunters and their families who live in the bush for at least several weeks of the year.

== See also ==
- Baie-James
- Great Recycling and Northern Development Canal
- James Bay Cree hydroelectric conflict
- List of generating stations in Quebec
- Quebec – New England Transmission
- Robert A. Boyd
- Site C dam
- Kinzua dam
- Alta controversy
- Environmental racism
