= Laforge-1 generating station =

Hydroelectric power station in Quebec

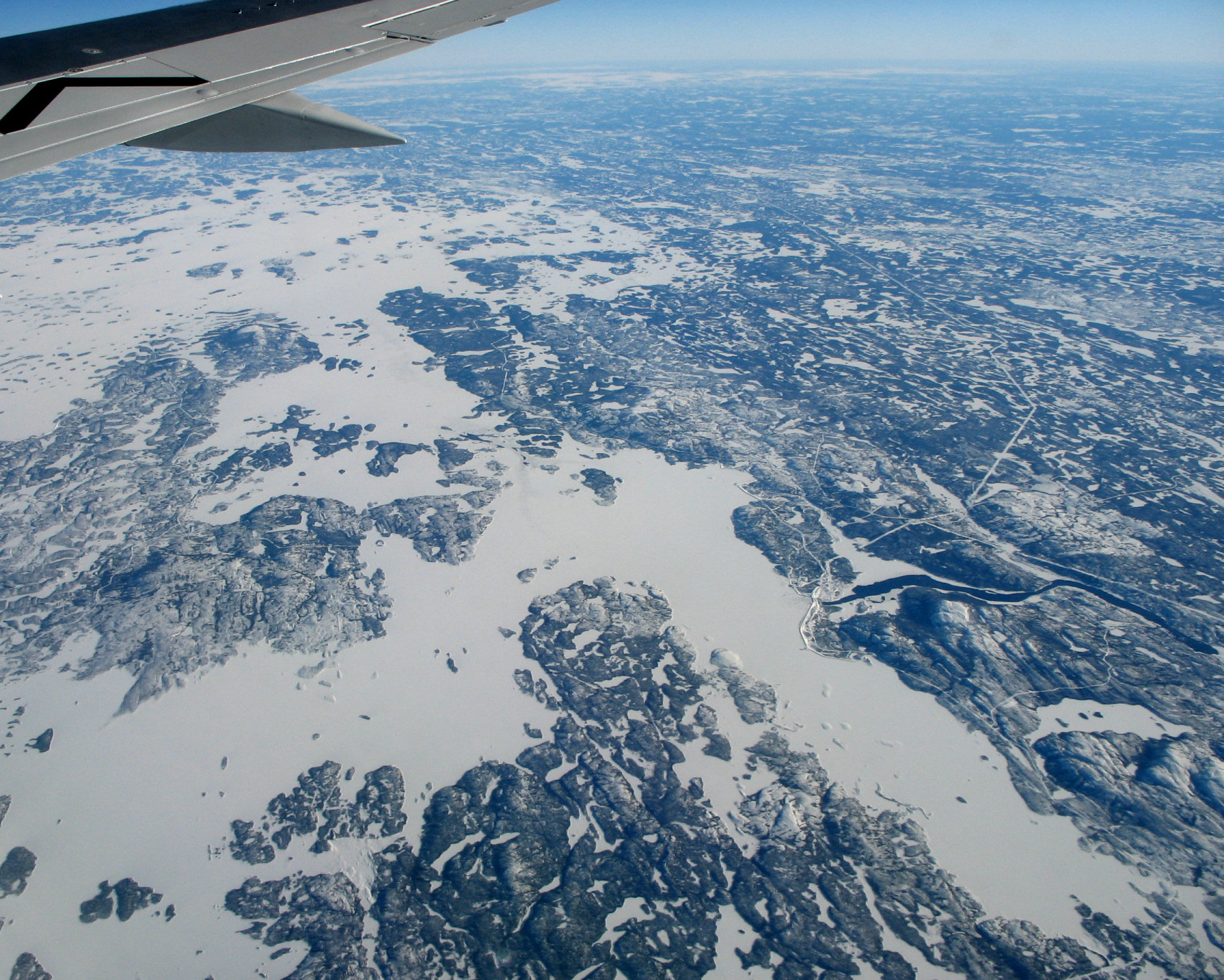
- Aerial view of the Laforge-1 dam and reservoir
- Interactive map of Laforge-1 generating station
- Official name: Laforge-1
- Location: Baie-James, Quebec, Canada
- Coordinates: 54°10′00″N 72°37′00″W
- Opening date: 1994
- Owner: Hydro-Québec

Dam and spillways
- Impounds: Laforge River
- Spillway capacity: 2,510 m^{3}/s (88,640 cu ft/s)

Reservoir
- Creates: Laforge-1 Reservoir
- Surface area: 1,288 km^{2} (497 mi^{2})

Power Station
- Hydraulic head: 57.3 m (188 ft)
- Turbines: 6 × 146.3 MW (Francis turbine)
- Installed capacity: 878 MW
- Hydro-Québec, The La Grande Complex visitor booklet, 2004, ISBN 2-550-41276-1

The Laforge-1 is a hydroelectric power station on the Laforge River, a tributary of the La Grande River, and is part of Hydro-Québec's James Bay Project. Commissioned in 1993–1994, it generates up to 878 MW through the reservoir and dam system.

== See also ==
- List of largest power stations in Canada
- Reservoirs and dams in Canada
