= La Grande-1 generating station =

Hydroelectric power station in Quebec

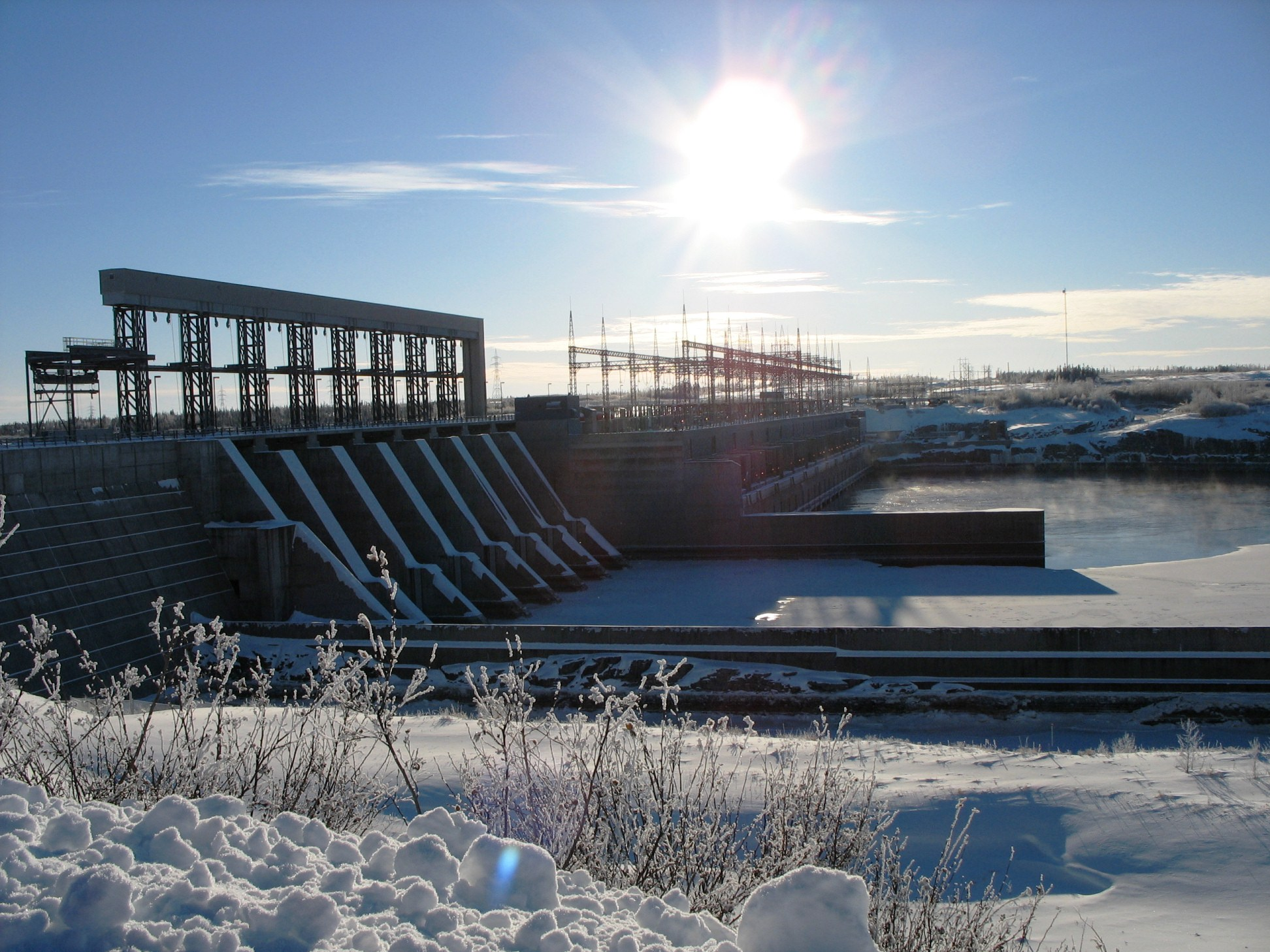

- Location within Quebec
- Official name: Centrale La Grande-1
- Country: Canada
- Location: Baie-James, Quebec
- Coordinates: 53°44′04″N 78°34′25″W
- Status: Operational
- Construction began: 1989
- Opening date: 1994-1995
- Construction cost: C$2.5 billion
- Owner: Hydro-Québec

Dam and spillways
- Type of dam: Barrage
- Impounds: La Grande River
- Height: 25 m (82 ft)
- Length: 2,584 m (8,478 ft)
- Dam volume: 1,070,000 m^{3} (38,000,000 ft^{3})
- Spillways: 1
- Spillway type: Parabolic
- Spillway capacity: 16,280 m^{3}/s (574,923 cu ft/s)

Reservoir
- Total capacity: 1,228 hm^{3} (4.34×10^{10} ft^{3})
- Active capacity: 98 hm^{3} (3.5×10^{9} ft^{3})
- Surface area: 70 km^{2} (27 mi^{2})
- Maximum length: 75 km (47 mi)
- Normal elevation: 32.0 m (105.0 ft)

Power Station
- Type: Run-of-the-river
- Hydraulic head: 27.5 m (90 ft)
- Turbines: 12 × Kaplan turbines General Electric (8); GEC Alsthom (4)
- Installed capacity: 1,436 MW
- Capacity factor: 57%
- Annual generation: 7,500 GWh

The La Grande-1 (LG-1) is a hydroelectric power station on the La Grande River that is part of Hydro-Québec's James Bay Project. The station can generate 1,436 MW and was commissioned in 1994–1995. A run of the river generating station, it is one of only two generating stations of the James Bay Project that use a reservoir without any major water-level fluctuations (the Laforge-2 generating station is the other). Thus, the amount of electricity generated by the station depends almost entirely on the water-flow of the river, which is largely controlled by upstream reservoirs and generating stations.

== See also ==
- List of largest power stations in Canada
- List of electrical generating stations in Quebec
- Reservoirs and dams in Canada
- Hydro-Québec
- James Bay Project
- Chisasibi, Quebec
