= James Bay Energy =

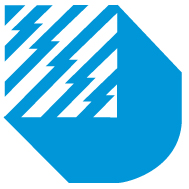
Logo of the Société d'énergie de la Baie James

The Société d'énergie de la Baie James is the company in charge of building the hydroelectric development known as the James Bay Project in northern Quebec. It was established in December 1971 by the Société de développement de la Baie James (SDBJ), a Crown corporation of the province of Quebec and became a wholly owned subsididiary of Hydro-Québec in 1978.

== Origins ==
In the summer of 1971, the National Assembly of Quebec passed Bill 50, an Act establishing the Société de développement de la Baie James (SDBJ), a Crown corporation tasked with the development of natural resources as well as the general administration of the James Bay territory. The development of the hydroelectric potential was the focus of a newly created subsidiary (the SEBJ) with Hydro-Québec as a majority shareholder along with the SDBJ. Both corporations would be chaired by Pierre A. Nadeau, an insurance executive recruited by Robert Bourassa's money man, Paul Desrochers.

The passage of Bill 50 was controversial with Hydro-Québec's top executives, who felt the government tried to bypass the powerful utility. As the party picking up the bill, Hydro wanted control over the development of the hydroelectric project. Commissioner Robert A. Boyd, who was slated as the top Hydro-Québec executive and Nadeau's right-hand man at the SEBJ, first declined the appointment, explaining that with no background in public works, Nadeau would have little credibility with the engineers running the operations. Conflict soon erupted between Hydro-Québec and Nadeau, who left less than a year after his appointment. He was replaced by Boyd, who kept informed of the latest development on the project by consulting with colleagues on the board on a daily basis.

== See also ==
- James Bay Project
- Hydro-Québec
