= Iroquois Dam =

The Iroquois Dam, also known as the Iroquois Control Dam, is a significant piece of infrastructure located on the St. Lawrence River in Canada. The dam is located in Iroquois, Ontario, and has played an essential role in managing the water levels of the river.

The dam forms a water reservoir upstream of the power dam between Cornwall, Ontario, and Massena, New York. The Iroquois Dam limits high water levels downstream in Lake St. Lawrence and during ice management operations to help facilitate the formation of a safe, stable ice cover upstream of the structure.
