= La Grande-3 generating station =

Hydroelectric power station in Quebec

- Interactive map of La Grande-3 generating station
- Official name: La Grande-3
- Location: Baie-James, Quebec, Canada
- Coordinates: 53°43′47″N 75°58′06″W
- Opening date: 1984
- Owner: Hydro-Québec

Dam and spillways
- Impounds: La Grande River
- Spillway capacity: 10,000 m^{3}/s (350,000 cu ft/s)

Reservoir
- Creates: La Grande-3 Reservoir
- Surface area: 2,420 km^{2} (934 mi^{2})

Power Station
- Hydraulic head: 79.2 m (260 ft)
- Turbines: 12 × 201.5 MW (Francis turbine)
- Installed capacity: 2,418 MW
- Capacity factor: 58%
- Annual generation: 12,300 GW·h
- Hydro-Québec, The La Grande Complex visitor booklet, 2004, ISBN 2-550-41276-1

The La Grande-3 or LG-3 is a hydroelectric dam on the La Grande River in northern Quebec, part of Hydro-Québec's James Bay Project. The station can generate 2,418 MW and was commissioned in 1982–1984. It generates electricity through the reservoir and dam system. The dam and reservoir both are named La Grande-3. The community of Sakami was founded for its construction.

== See also ==
- List of largest power stations in Canada
- Reservoirs and dams in Canada
