= Robert-Bourassa generating station =

Hydroelectric power station in Québec, Canada

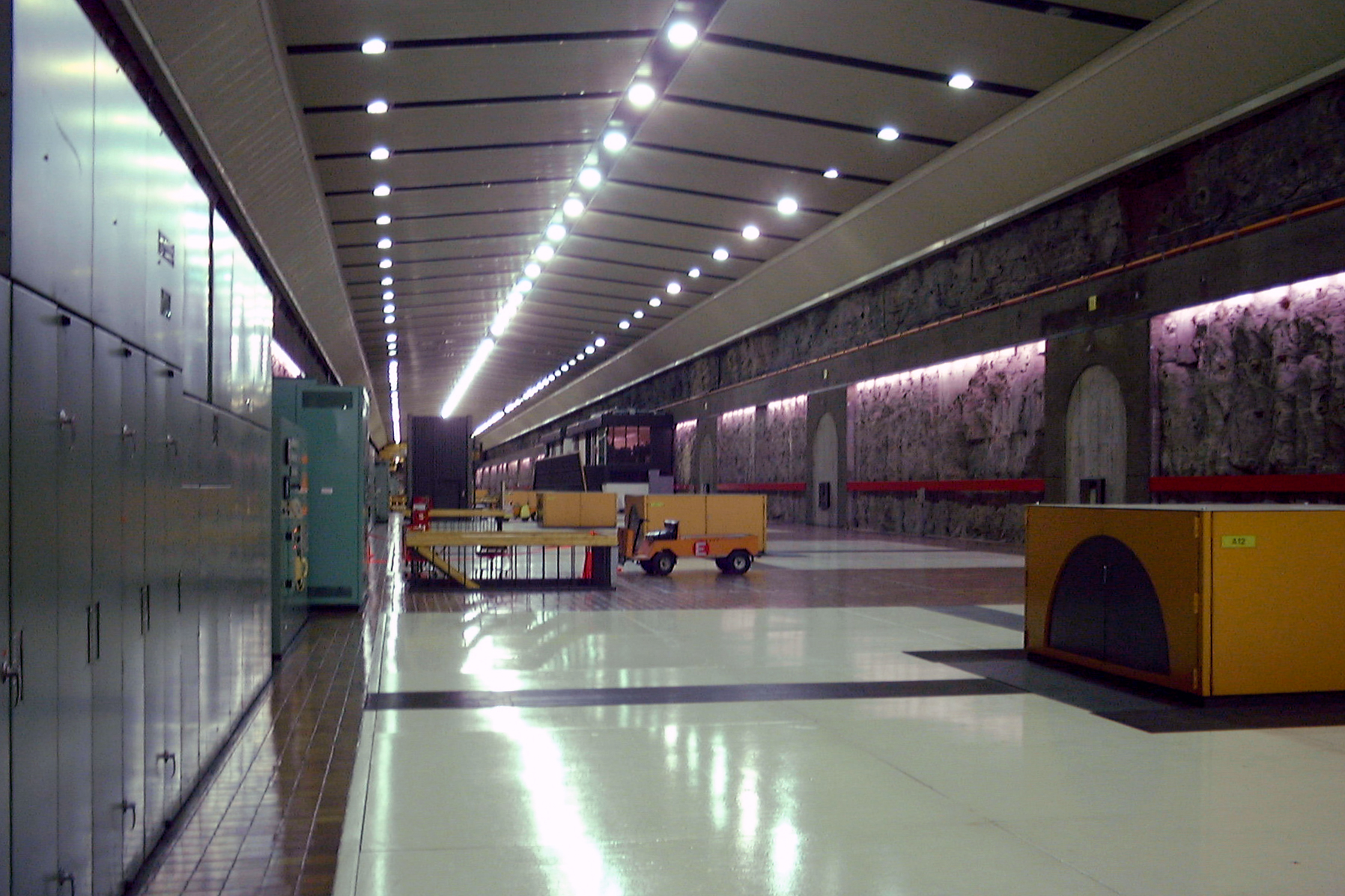
- Interactive map of Robert-Bourassa generating station
- Official name: Centrale Robert-Bourassa
- Location: Baie-James, Quebec, Canada
- Coordinates: 53°47′43″N 77°26′26″W
- Construction began: 1974
- Opening date: 1981
- Construction cost: C$3.8 billion (1987)
- Owner: Hydro-Québec

Dam and spillways
- Type of dam: Embankment dam
- Impounds: La Grande River
- Height: 162 m (531 ft)
- Length: 2,835 m (9,301 ft)
- Width (crest): 9 m (30 ft)
- Spillway capacity: 17,600 m^{3}/s (621,538 cu ft/s)

Reservoir
- Creates: Robert-Bourassa Reservoir
- Total capacity: 61.7 km^{3} (50,000,000 acre⋅ft)
- Surface area: 2,835 km^{2} (1,095 mi^{2})

Power Station
- Hydraulic head: 137.2 m (450 ft)
- Turbines: 16 × 351 MW; Francis turbines
- Installed capacity: 5,616 MW
- Capacity factor: 63%
- Annual generation: 31,000 GWh (110,000 TJ)
- Sources: * Société d'énergie de la Baie James 1987, pp. 117–180, 370*Hydro-Québec, The La Grande Complex visitor booklet, 2004, ISBN 2-550-41276-1

The Robert-Bourassa generating station, formerly known as La Grande-2 (LG-2), is a hydroelectric power station on the La Grande River that is part of Hydro-Québec's James Bay Project in Canada. The station can generate 5,616 MW and its 16 units were gradually commissioned between 1979 and 1981. Annual generation is in the vicinity of 26500 GWh.

Together with the adjacent 2,106 MW La Grande-2-A generating station (LG-2-A), commissioned in 1991–1992, it uses the reservoir and dam system of the Robert-Bourassa Reservoir to generate electricity. The two plants taken together account for more than 20% of Hydro-Québec's total installed capacity of 36,810 MW in 2009. It is Canada's largest hydroelectric power station, ranks in 15th place on the list of largest hydroelectric power stations and is the world's largest underground power station.

Initially known as La Grande-2, it was renamed after Robert Bourassa who, as Premier of Quebec (1970–1976 and 1985–1994), gave the James Bay Project a vital political impetus.

== Context ==
The Robert-Bourassa generating station is the main facility of the James Bay hydroelectric project, a large hydroelectric complex built on the La Grande River, a large river in Quebec's sparsely populated northern Quebec. It was also the first to be built, between 1974 and 1981. It was inaugurated by Premier René Lévesque of Quebec, on October 27, 1979.

Design work on the generating station, dam and reservoir began in October 1970 when Montreal-based engineering firm Rousseau Sauvé Warren (RSW) was commissioned by Hydro-Québec to prepare a feasibility study for a hydroelectric complex on the La Grande River. Another engineering firm, Asselin, Benoît, Boucher, Ducharme & Lapointe (ABBDL) was tasked with a feasibility study on the more southerly NBR (Nottaway, Broadback, Rupert) rivers. At RSW the development of the La Grande River was championed by François Rousseau, one of firm's associates and a former Hydro-Québec senior engineer.

A final decision to build the hydroelectric complex on the La Grande hydrographic system was made in 1972, after engineers determined the NBR project would be less cost effective because of the silty nature of the soils in the NBR area. The La Grande option had the added advantages of a lesser impact on First Nations hunting and fishing, on the boreal forest and would require less flooding.

== Construction ==
The main dam is located 117.5 kilometers (73.0 mi) from the mouth of the river, in the transition zone between the plateau and the coastal plain, and has a maximum height of 162 meters (531 ft). Twenty-nine dykes of various sizes close the reservoir. They are organized in three group: dykes D1-D4 are located north of the spillway, nicknamed the Staircase of the Giants, D5-D14 are located on the left shore of the river while a third group, nicknamed the Duncan dykes (D17-D27), are located 30 kilometers (19 mi) south. The dam and dykes hold a reservoir covering an area of 2,835 square kilometres (1,095 mi^{2}) with a useful capacity of 19.365 billion m^{3}.

The generating station itself is located 137.2 meters (450 ft) underground, 6 kilometers (3.7 mi) downstream from the main dam. It hosts 16 Francis turbines, set up in two groups of eight each.

In 1974, in what was one of the most extreme cases of workplace sabotage up to that time, workers at the La Grande-2 site used bulldozers to topple electric generators, damage fuel tanks, and set buildings on fire. The project was delayed a year, and the direct cost of the damage estimated at CAD$2 million. The causes were not clear, however three factors have been cited: inter-union rivalry, poor working conditions, and the perceived arrogance of American executives at the contractor, Bechtel Corporation.

=== Road ===
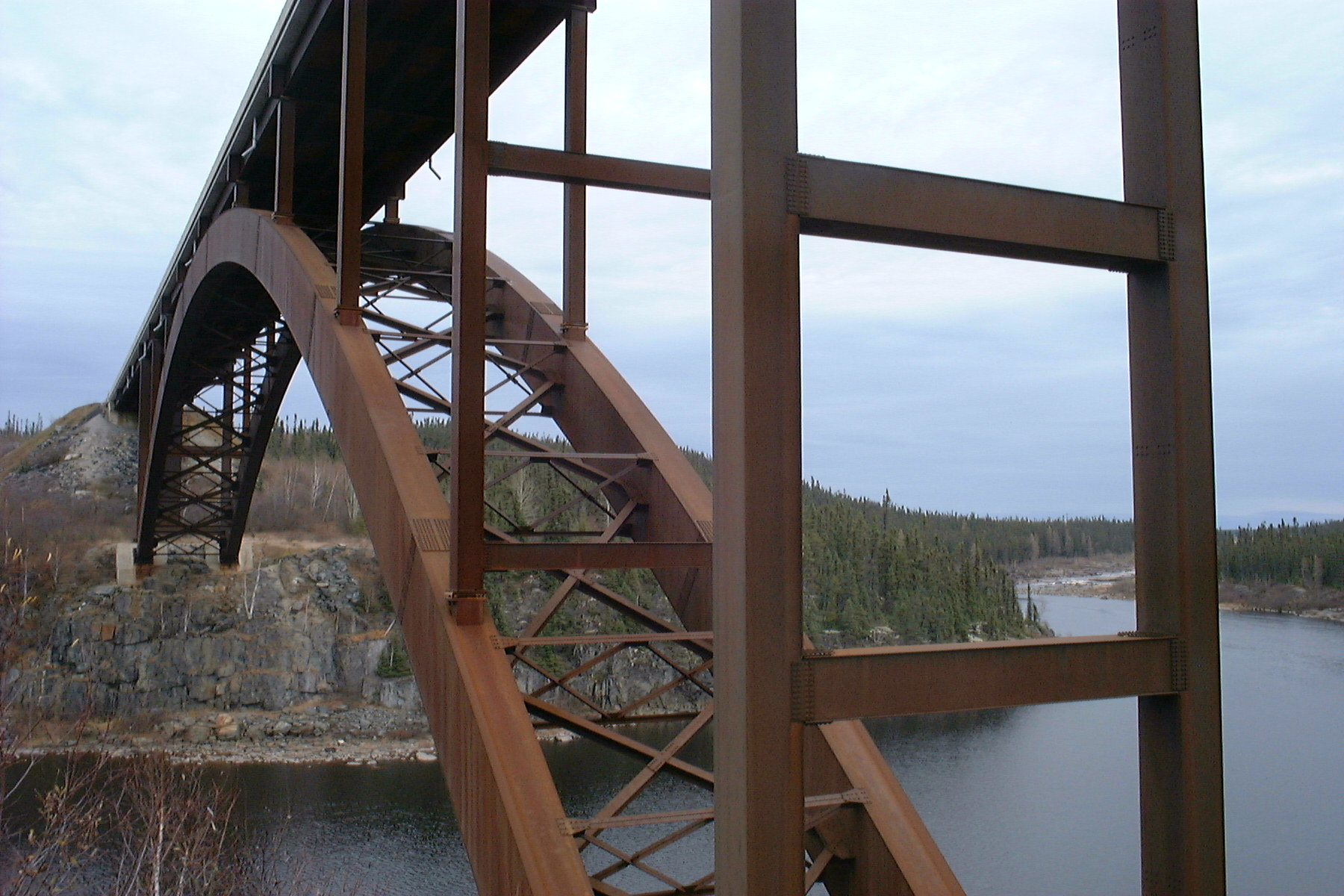
The 274-metre long Eastmain River bridge, one of 12 river crossings built to link the worksite to southern Quebec.

The first step towards the construction of the La Grande-2 generating station took place in June 1971, in Matagami, a small mining town located 630 kilometers (390 mi) south of La Grande River. Engineering firm Desjardins, Sauriol and Associates were tasked with the construction of a basic road to the future site and the Cree settlement at Fort George. The deadline was tight: 450 miles (720 km) in 450 days.

The first challenge involved deploying teams of land surveyors and lumberjacks by seaplanes and helicopters to clear a path for a permanent road. Parallel to the path, a few kilometres away, an ice road was built to move heavy machinery north. The first milestone was reached on February 11, 1972, with the opening of the 555 meters (1,821 ft) ice bridge crossing the Rupert River.

The temporary road reached the La Grande River in December 1972, allowing the minimum necessary level of access needed to begin work – namely to construct housing for the thousands of people who would work on the dam for the next decade. A permanent road surfaced with gravel was completed on October 20, 1974, at a cost of $348 million, and was paved over the next two years.

=== Temporary diversion ===
The first stage of construction was the temporary diversion of the La Grande River; the tunnels had to be big enough to protect the construction site from floods, but not so large as to unnecessarily increase cost. Two diversion tunnels were drilled into the left bank of the river and were opened on April 27, 1975. For the next three and a half years the flow of the river would be diverted through the tunnels. Each tunnel was 14.8 metres (49 ft) wide and 18 metres (59 ft) high; the north tunnel was 730 metres (2,400 ft) long and the south, 830 metres (2,720 ft). The tunnels were designed to carry the 65-year flood flow of the La Grande River, calculated at 7,500 cubic metres per second (260,000 cu ft/s).

Since the original construction schedule called for completion on February 15, 1980, the south diversion tunnel was scheduled to be closed in November 1978, during low river flows in the winter. However, the deadline was revised forward by 60 days, and the tunnel had to be reinforced to withstand harsh autumn conditions.

After the dam was completed, the tunnels are still used as flood control outlet works and have a design flow of 3,100 cubic metres per second (110,000 cu ft/s).

=== Dam and dykes ===
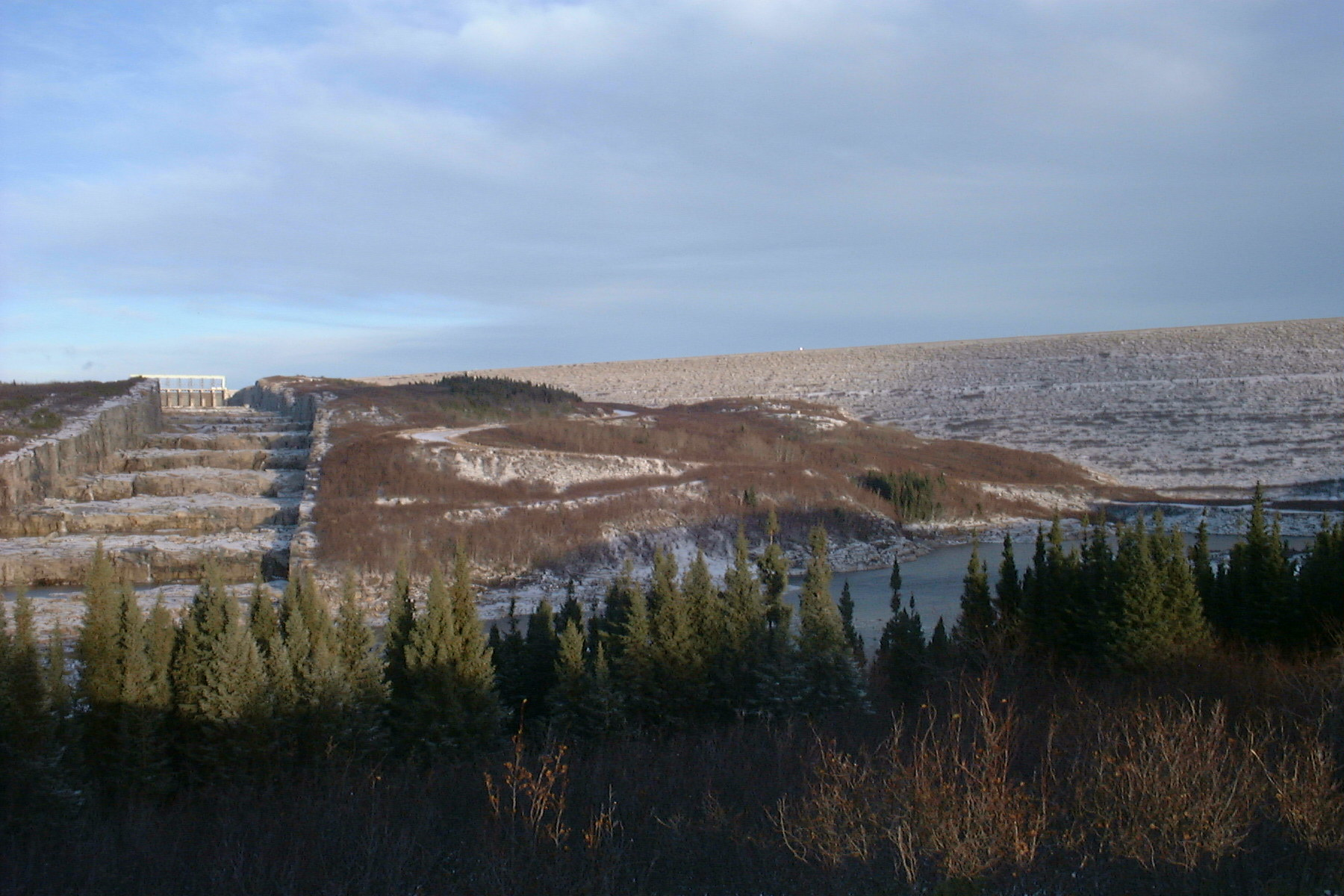
Spillway (left) and main dam

The Robert-Bourassa dam is located 117.5 kilometres (73.0 mi) from the mouth of the La Grande River, in the transition zone between the Laurentian Plateau (the elevated Canadian Shield) and the coastal plain. It has a maximum height of 162 metres (531 ft) and is 2,836 metres (9,304 ft) long at the crest. The core of the earthfill dam is made of glacial moraine which is impervious, and available in large quantities within a 10 kilometres (6.2 mi) radius of the dam site, due to extensive glaciation of the area during the last ice age. The core is slightly inclined upstream, to increase resistance against the immense pressure of water in the reservoir. The layers above consist of fill zones of varying coarseness, and is surfaced with riprap to reduce erosion.

The original plan envisioned the construction of a concrete-face rock-fill dam, but this was rejected in favor of a more conventional embankment design, partly because of the lower cost, and also because the concrete face would have to be inspected from time to time requiring drainage of the reservoir. Because of the huge size of the reservoir, this would be essentially impossible.

In order to hold the reservoir at its operating height of 175.3 metres (575 ft), 29 dikes surround the reservoir basin at various locations. Dikes D-1 to D-4 are located immediately to the north; D-5 to D-14 (the "Forebay dikes") to the south; and D-17 to D-27 (the "Duncan dikes") about 30 miles (48 km) further south. They range in size from D-26B, 82 metres (269 ft) long, to D-20, 6,052 metres (19,856 ft) long.

Dams and dikes of the Robert-Bourassa development
Type	Crest length		Max. height		Min. top width		Excavation volume		Fill volume	
	m	ft	m	ft	m	ft	m^{3}	ft^{3}	m^{3}	ft^{3}
North dikes (D1-D4)	5,278	17,316	50	160	8	26	1,361,000	48,100,000	26,274,000	927,900,000
Main dam	2,836	9,304	162	531	9	30	1,361,000	48,100,000	26,274,000	927,900,000
Forebay dikes (D5-D14)	9,018	29,587	66	217	7.6	25	2,176,000	76,800,000	11,482,000	405,500,000
Duncan dikes (D14-D27)	13,675	44,865	52	171	7.6	25	1,884,000	66,500,000	12,070,000	426,000,000
Total	27,972	91,772					5,421,000	191,400,000	49,826,000	1.7596×10^{9}

=== Reservoir ===
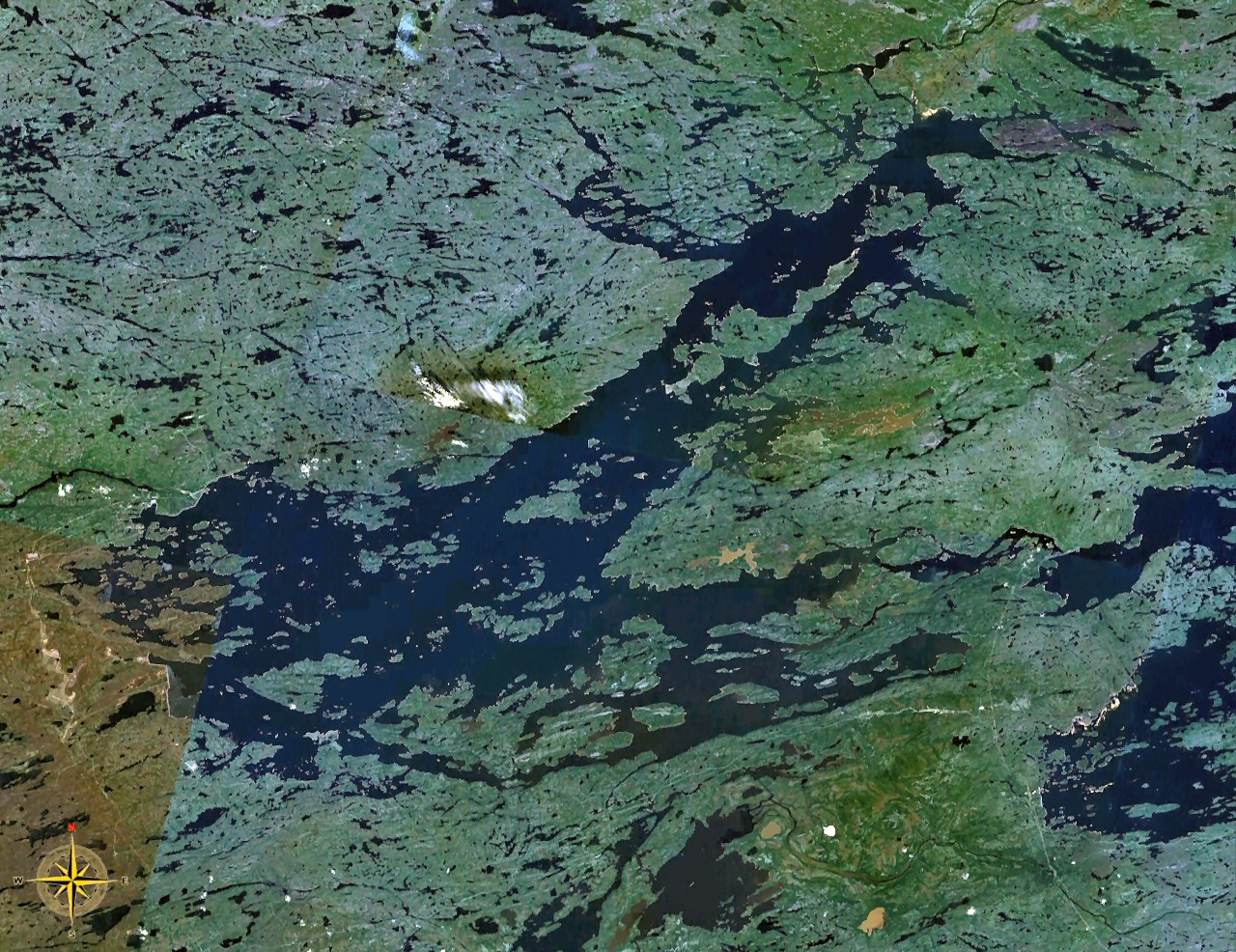
The Robert Bourassa Reservoir as seen from space

Covering an area of 2,835 square kilometres (1,095 mi^{2}) – greater in size than Luxembourg – the vast Robert-Bourassa Reservoir is fed by an upstream catchment of 32,480 square kilometres (12,540 mi^{2}), plus water diversions from the James Bay Project, the Caniapiscau Reservoir and the EOL (Eastmain-Opinaca-La Grande) diversion project. About 19.365 cubic kilometres (15,699,000 acre⋅ft) is active or usable storage for power generation, out of a total volume of 61.4 cubic kilometres (49,800,000 acre⋅ft). Because of its great size, it is inhabited by a diverse array of aquatic flora and fauna.

On November 27, 1978, the diversion tunnels were closed and water began to back up behind the dam. The enormous reservoir took over a year to completely fill. The water initially rose very fast: 43 metres (141 ft) during the first week, with 15 metres (49 ft) on the first day alone. The reservoir reached its minimum operational level of 167.6 metres (550 ft) on September 2, 1979, and reached its normal maximum level of 175.3 metres (575 ft) in December 1979.

==== Desaulniers pumping station ====
The construction of the Duncan dikes partially blocked the flow of the Desaulniers River, which is located to the southeast of the Robert-Bourassa Reservoir. The river flowed into Desaulniers Lake at an elevation of 143.3 metres (470 ft), 32 metres (105 ft) below the level of the Robert-Bourassa Reservoir. To prevent the flooding of an additional 30 square kilometres (12 mi^{2}) and preserve the lake in its natural state, a pump station was installed which removes water from the Desaulniers Lake to the Robert-Bourassa Reservoir. The pump station was designed to remove an annual average of 2.8 cubic metres per second (99 cu ft/s), from a drainage area of 160 square kilometres (62 mi^{2}).

The pumping station was commissioned in June 1977. It has four pumps with a capacity of 1.7 cubic metres per second (60 cu ft/s) each, with a maximum lift of 54.3 metres (178 ft). Each pump is powered by a 1,120 KW (1,500 hp) motor. The pumping station also served to divert water away from the Desaulniers river bed, during the construction of dike D-20.

=== Spillway ===
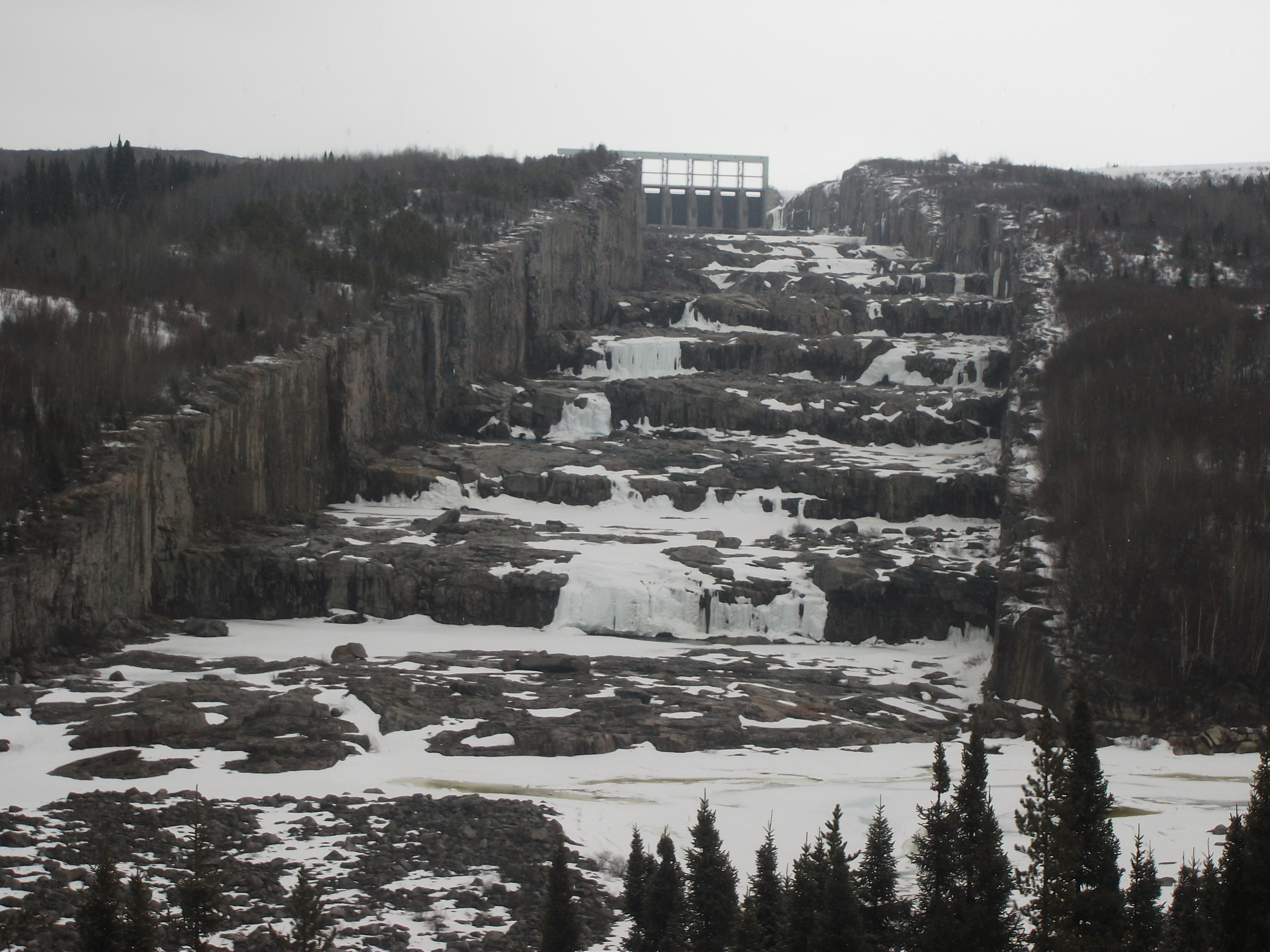
Spillway close up view

The spillway, nicknamed Staircase of the Giants, is near the north end of the main dam and is part of dike D-4. It consists of a concrete control structure and a man-made waterfall discharging into a stilling basin below the dam. The spillway has eight 12.2-metre (40 ft) wide gates, separated by 4.3-metre (14 ft) thick columns. The gates are opened and closed by cable winches, in order to control spills. The eight gates are all opened at the same time once every 15 years.

Having passed through the gates, the kinetic energy of the water is dissipated in a 135-by-122-metre (443 ft × 400 ft) basin at the foot of the control structure. It then flows down a 1,500-metre (4,900 ft) long rock channel with a vertical drop of 110-metre (360 ft) on its way back into the La Grande river. The channel has 10 steps ranging from 9.1 to 12.2 metres (30 to 40 ft) in height and 127 to 200 metres (417 to 656 ft) in length. The flow rate increases from 11 metres per second (36 ft/s) at the top of the spillway to 22 metres per second (72 ft/s) at the bottom.

=== Generating station ===
The Robert-Bourassa hydroelectric station, formerly named La Grande-2 or LG2, is located underground about 6 kilometres (3.7 mi) downstream of the main dam. With an installed capacity of 5,616 megawatts, it is the largest power station owned by Hydro-Québec, and the largest underground power station in the world. On October 27, 1979, 3,000 people gathered for the dedication of the power plant by Quebec Premier René Lévesque.

The underground complex, including a service tunnel, the generation room and a surge chamber, required the excavation of 2,350,000 cubic metres (83,000,000 ft^{3}) of material. The plant was constructed by Rousseau Sauvé Warren (RSW) of Montreal. Unlike other facilities in the James Bay Project, the LG2 was constructed to imperial rather than metric specifications, even though Canada had converted to the metric system in the 1970s.

The power station can be accessed either by an elevator or a tunnel. The plant has 16 Francis turbines, divided into two sets of eight each, and separated by a mounting area, workshops, control room, elevator shaft and ventilation system.

The turbines were built by two partners of James Bay Energy (SEBJ). Units 1, 3, 5, 7, 10, 12, 14 and 16 were built by Marine Industries Limited (MIL), while units 2, 4, 6, 8, 9, 11, 13 and 15 were built by Canadian General Electric (alternators) and Dominion Engineering Works (turbines). The two groups have somewhat different characteristics. The turbines manufactured by MIL are lighter, 96 tonnes compared to 111, and have fifteen blades, compared to 11 for the other group.

Each turbine is rated at 339 MW at a 137-metre (449 ft) head and a speed of 133.33 rpm. The generators are rated at 370 megavolt amperes (MVA), which is increased to 390 MVA in the winter.

Power station specifications
Facility	Soil excavation		Rock excavation		Concrete		Steel	
	m^{3}	ft^{3}	m^{3}	ft^{3}	m^{3}	ft^{3}	kg	lb
Intake channel	78,000	2,800,000	552,000	19,500,000				
Water crane			183,000	6,500,000	81,500	2,880,000	4,200,000	9,300,000
Penstocks			190,000	6,700,000	55,000	1,900,000	960,000	2,120,000
Service tunnel and well			101,000	3,600,000	3,500	120,000	25,000	55,000
Adit	21,000	740,000	175,000	6,200,000	2,500	88,000	3,000	6,600
Transformer station	417,000	14,700,000	530,000	19,000,000	19,000	670,000	711,000	1,567,000
Generator room and ventilation			454,000	16,000,000	127,000	4,500,000	5,951,000	13,120,000
Surge chamber			371,000	13,100,000	12,000	420,000	550,000	1,210,000
Drainage galleries	608,000	21,500,000	1,370,000	48,000,000	500	18,000		
Tailrace	114,000	4,000,000	179,000	6,300,000				
Total	1,238,000	43,720,000	4,105,000	144,967,000	301,000	10,630,000	12,400,000	27,337,000

=== La Grande-2-A ===
This part of the James Bay Project can generate 2,106 MW and was commissioned in 1991–1992.

== Photos ==
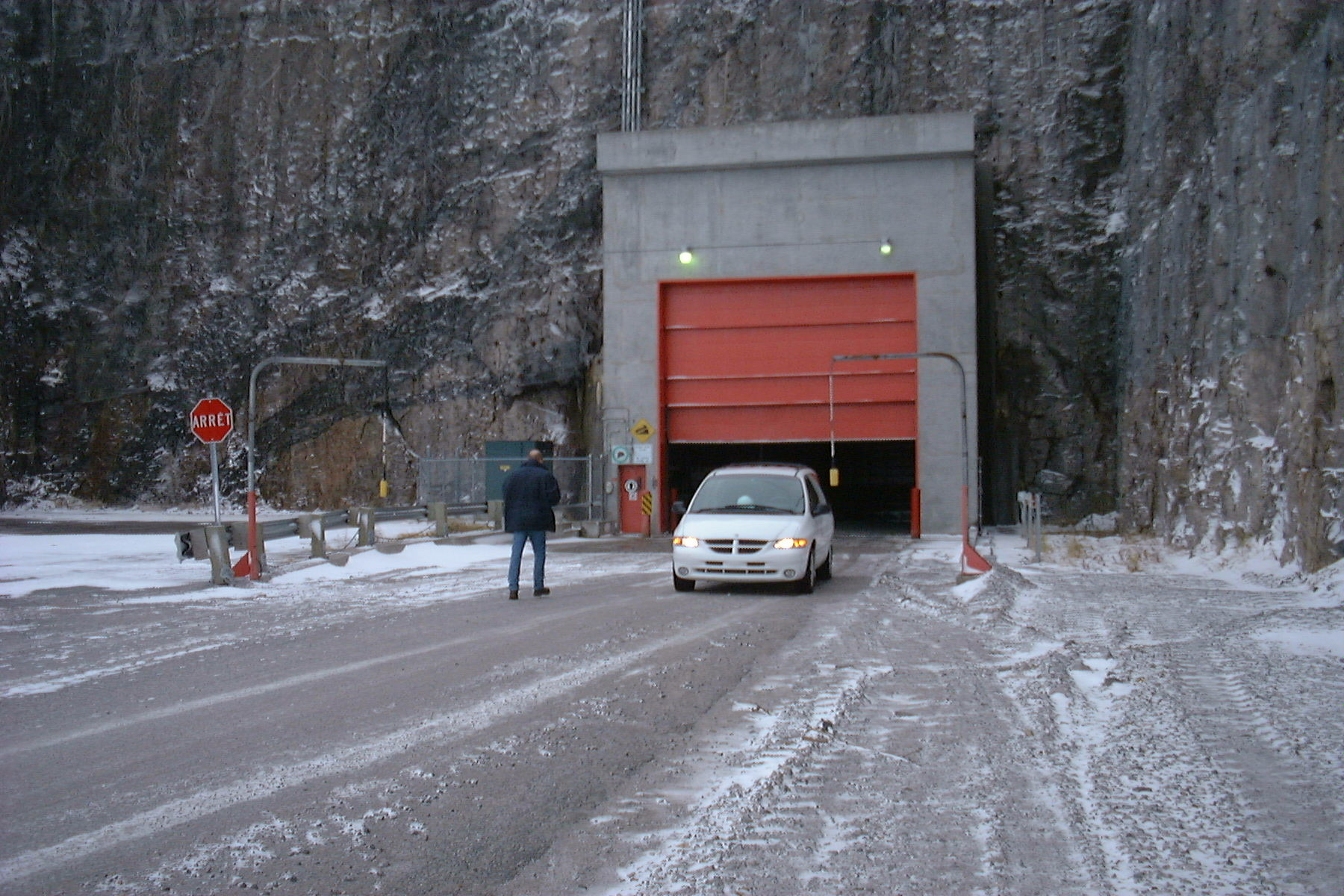
Main entrance of the underground generating station

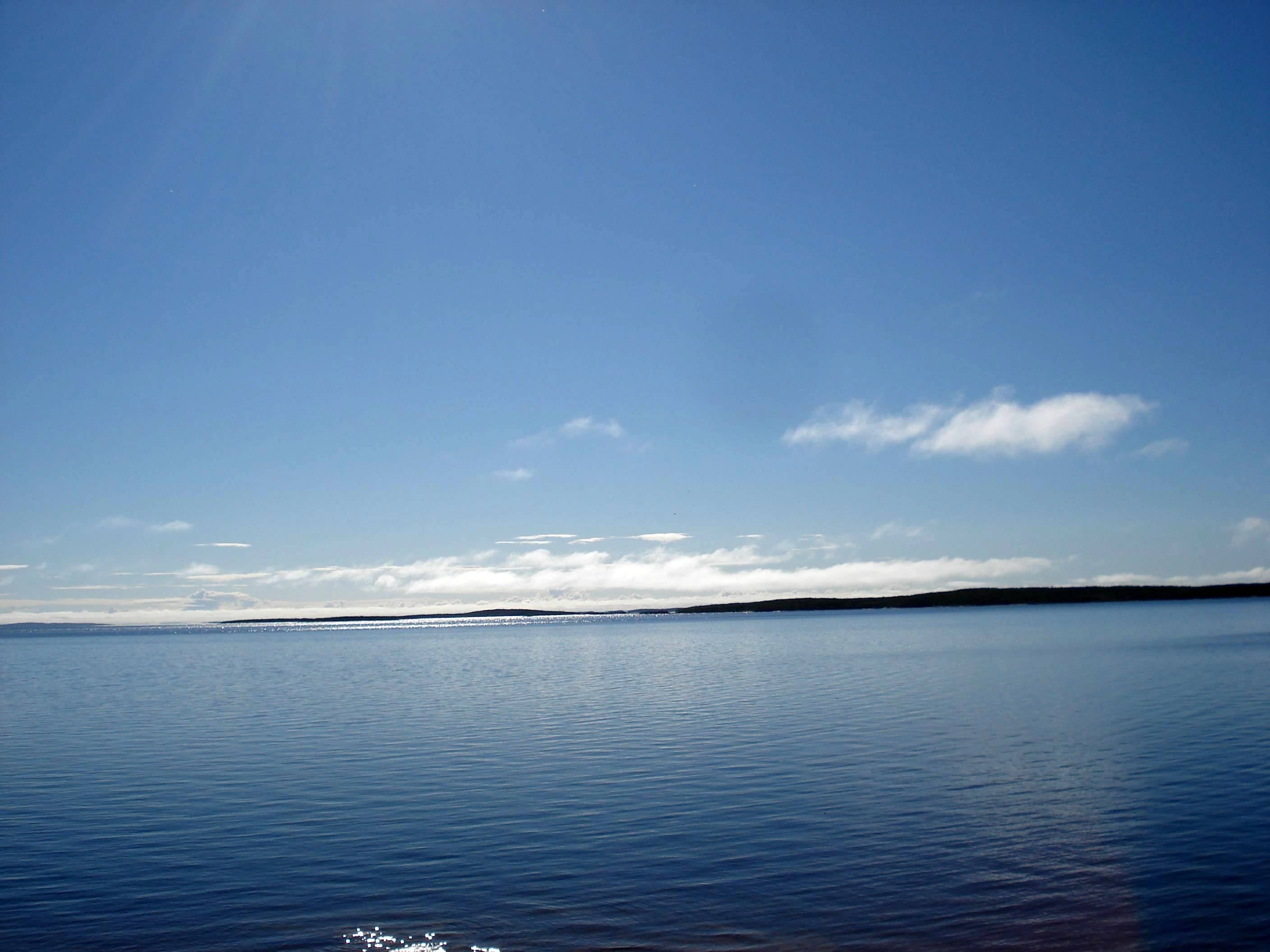
The Robert-Bourassa Reservoir, near the generating station

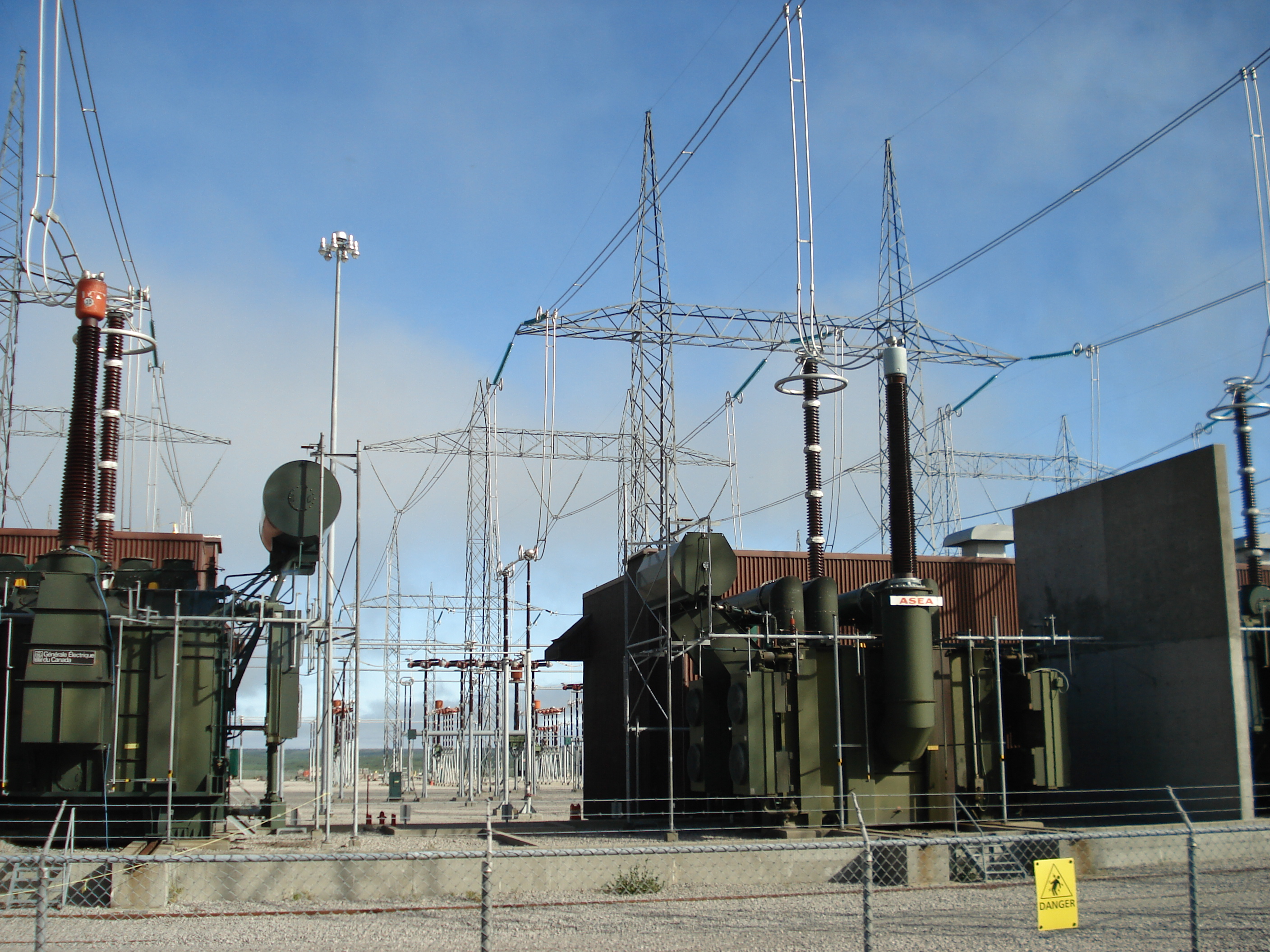
Electric transformers at the plant's switchyard

== See also ==
- List of largest power stations in Canada
- List of conventional hydroelectric power stations
- List of hydroelectric stations in Quebec
- Reservoirs and dams in Canada

== Works cited ==
- Bolduc, André; Hogue, Clarence; Larouche, Daniel (1989), Hydro-Québec, l'hértitage d'un siècle d'électricité (in French) (third ed.), Montreal: Libre-Expression / Forces, ISBN 2-89111-388-8 (also available in English, under the title Hydro-Québec After 100 Years of Electricity)
- Bolduc, André (2000), Du génie au pouvoir : Robert A. Boyd, à la gouverne d'Hydro-Québec aux années glorieuses (in French), Montreal: Libre Expression, ISBN 2-89111-829-4.
- Lacasse, Roger (1983), Baie James, une épopée, Montreal: Libre Expression, ISBN 2-89111-109-5.
- Société d'énergie de la Baie James (1987), Complexe hydroélectrique de la Grande-Rivière. Réalisation de la première phase (in French), Montreal: Société d'énergie de la Baie James/Éditions de la Chenelière, ISBN 2-89310-010-4.
- Turgeon, Pierre (1992), La Radissonie, le pays de la baie James (in French), Montreal: Libre expression, ISBN 2-89111-502-3.
