= Roland Giroux =

- Born: 15 January 1913
- Died: 4 November 1991 (aged 78)
- Known for: Chair, Quebec Hydro-Electric Commission
- Spouse: Yvette Blain
- Awards: Order of Canada

Roland Giroux, CC (15 January 1913 – 4 November 1991) was from 1969 to 1977 the Chairman of the Quebec Hydro-Electric Commission (today known generally as Hydro-Québec).

He is a member of the Order of Canada, first becoming an Officer in June 1972 then in July 1977 was promoted as a Companion, the highest rank within the order.

Giroux died of a heart attack in Quebec at age 78 leaving his wife Yvette Blain and three children.
