= La Grande-4 generating station =

Hydroelectric power station in Quebec

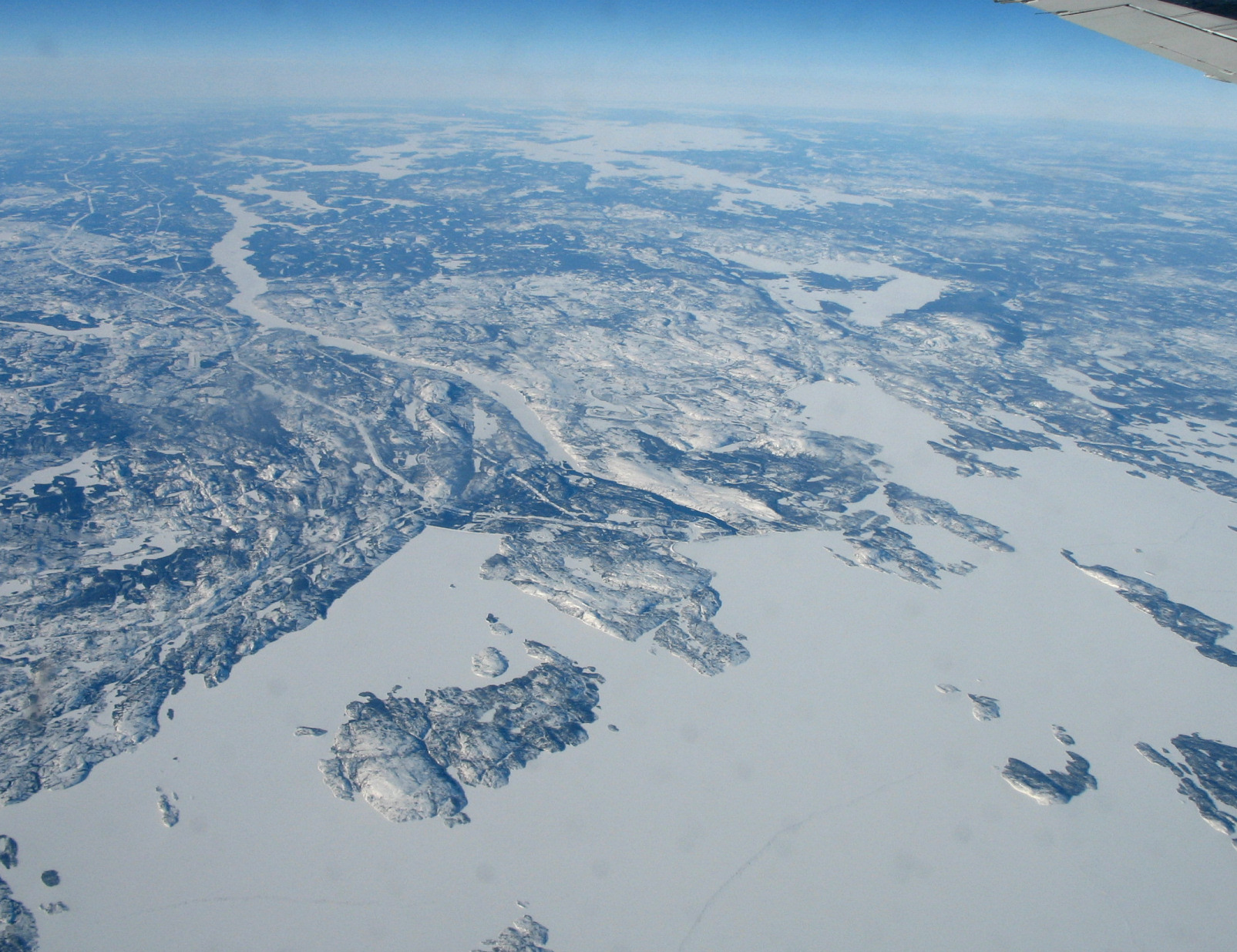
- Aerial view of the La Grande-4 reservoir and dam
- Interactive map of La Grande-4 generating station
- Official name: La Grande-4
- Location: Baie-James, Quebec, Canada
- Coordinates: 53°53′10″N 73°27′45″W
- Opening date: 1986
- Owner: Hydro-Québec

Dam and spillways
- Impounds: La Grande River
- Height: 125 m (410 ft)
- Length: 3,800 m (12,500 ft)
- Spillway capacity: 7,335 m^{3}/s (259,033 cu ft/s)

Reservoir
- Creates: LG-4 Reservoir
- Surface area: 765 km^{2} (295 mi^{2})

Power Station
- Hydraulic head: 116.7 m (383 ft)
- Turbines: 9 × 308.8 MW (Francis turbine)
- Installed capacity: 2,779 MW
- Hydro-Québec, The La Grande Complex visitor booklet, 2004, ISBN 2-550-41276-1

The La Grande-4 (LG-4) is a hydroelectric generating station on the La Grande River in Quebec, Canada that is part of Hydro-Québec's James Bay Project. The station can generate 2,779 MW and was commissioned in 1984. It generates electricity through the reservoir and dam system.

== See also ==
- List of largest power stations in Canada
- List of hydroelectric stations in Quebec
- Reservoirs and dams in Canada
