= La Grande River =

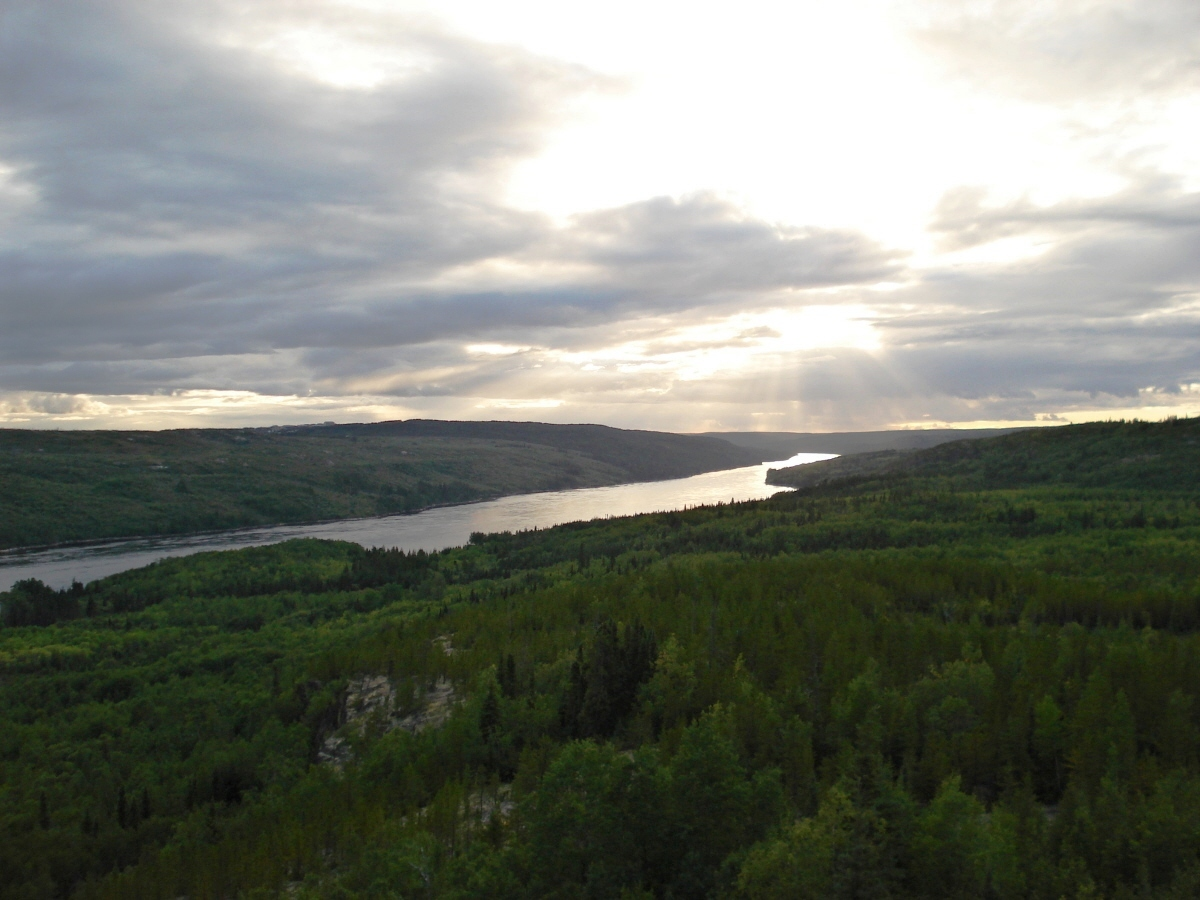
- La Grande River near Radisson, Quebec

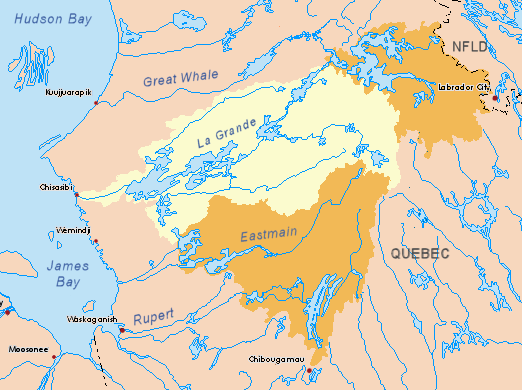
- La Grande River original basin in yellow. Diverted basins in orange.

Location
- Country: Canada
- Province: Quebec
- Region: Jamésie

Physical characteristics
- Source: Lac Nichicun
  - location: Nitchequon
  - coordinates: 53°12′30″N 70°56′00″W
- Mouth: James Bay
  - location: Chisasibi
  - coordinates: 53°50′00″N 79°04′00″W
  - elevation: 0 m (0 ft)
- Length: 893 km (555 mi)
- Basin size: 97,600 km^{2} (37,700 sq mi)
- Discharge
  - average: 3,400 m^{3}/s (120,000 cu ft/s)
  - minimum: 345 m^{3}/s (12,200 cu ft/s)
  - maximum: 4,450 m^{3}/s (157,000 cu ft/s)

La Grande River (French: La Grande Rivière, pronounced [la ɡʁɑ̃d ʁivjɛʁ]; Cree: Chisasibi; both meaning "great river") is a river in northwestern Quebec, Canada, rising in the highlands of the north-central part of the province and flowing roughly 900 km (560 mi) west to its drainage at James Bay. It is the second-longest river in the province, surpassed only by the Saint Lawrence River.

Originally, the La Grande River drained an area of 97,400 km^{2} (37,600 sq mi), and had a mean discharge of 1,690 m^{3}/s (60,000 cu ft/s). Since the 1980s, when hydroelectric development diverted the Eastmain and Caniapiscau rivers into the La Grande, its total catchment area has increased to about 175,000 km^{2} (68,000 sq mi), with its mean discharge being more than 3,400 m^{3}/s (120,000 cu ft/s). In November 2009, the Rupert River was also (partially) diverted, adding another 31,430 km^{2} (12,140 sq mi) to the basin.

At one time, the La Grande was known as the "Fort George River". The Hudson's Bay Company operated a trading post on the river, at Big River House, between 1803 and 1824. In 1837, a larger trading post was established at Fort George, on an island at the mouth of the river. In the early 20th century, this trading post became a village as the Crees of the James Bay region abandoned their nomadic way of life and settled nearby. The modern Cree village of Chisasibi, which replaced Fort George in 1980, is situated on the southern shore of the La Grande River, several kilometers to the East.

== Tributaries ==
Significant tributaries of La Grande River include:

- Kanaaupscow River
- Sakami River
  - Eastmain River (diverted)
    - Opinaca River
    - Rupert River (diverted)
- Rivière de Pontois
  - Rivière de la Corvette
- Laforge River
  - Caniapiscau River (diverted)

== Hydro-electric development ==
The river has been extensively developed as a source of hydroelectric power by Hydro-Québec, starting in 1974. An area of 9,900 km^{2} (3,800 sq mi) was flooded and almost all of the flow of the Eastmain River and approximately 70% of the flows of the Rupert River were diverted into the La Grande watershed. The following generating stations are on the La Grande River and its tributaries in upstream order:

- La-Grande-1 (LG-1)
- Robert-Bourassa
- La Grande-2A (LG-2A)
- La Grande-3 (LG-3)
- La Grande-4 (LG-4)
- Laforge-1 (LF-1)
- Laforge-2 (LF-2)
- Brisay
- Eastmain-1

As a result of the development projects, the Cree people of the region lost some parts of their traditional hunting and trapping territories (about 10% of the hunting and trapping territories used by the Cree of Chisasibi). Organic mercury levels increased in the fish, which forms an important part of their diet, as the organic material trapped by the rising waters in the new reservoirs began to filter into the food chain. Careful follow-up by Cree health authorities since the 1980s has been largely successful. The authorities continue to promote the regular consumption of fish, with the notable exception of the predatory species living in the reservoirs, which still show high levels of mercury.

== Climate ==
Climate data for La Grande Rivière (La Grande Rivière Airport) WMO ID: 71827; coordinates 53°38′N 77°42′W; elevation: 195.1 m (640 ft); 1991–2020 normals, extremes 1976–present
Month	Jan	Feb	Mar	Apr	May	Jun	Jul	Aug	Sep	Oct	Nov	Dec	Year
Record high humidex	3.0	4.8	12.0	21.8	33.9	38.0	44.3	35.5	31.6	28.3	13.4	7.6	44.3
Record high °C (°F)	3.3 (37.9)	5.0 (41.0)	11.8 (53.2)	22.3 (72.1)	32.6 (90.7)	35.0 (95.0)	37.3 (99.1)	31.2 (88.2)	28.3 (82.9)	23.5 (74.3)	12.3 (54.1)	7.4 (45.3)	37.3 (99.1)
Mean daily maximum °C (°F)	−17.2 (1.0)	−15.4 (4.3)	−7.9 (17.8)	0.5 (32.9)	10.1 (50.2)	18.1 (64.6)	20.7 (69.3)	18.8 (65.8)	12.9 (55.2)	5.5 (41.9)	−2.5 (27.5)	−10.8 (12.6)	2.7 (36.9)
Daily mean °C (°F)	−21.7 (−7.1)	−20.8 (−5.4)	−14.0 (6.8)	−5.1 (22.8)	4.3 (39.7)	11.5 (52.7)	14.8 (58.6)	13.6 (56.5)	8.6 (47.5)	2.4 (36.3)	−5.4 (22.3)	−14.5 (5.9)	−2.2 (28.0)
Mean daily minimum °C (°F)	−26.1 (−15.0)	−26.1 (−15.0)	−20.0 (−4.0)	−10.6 (12.9)	−1.6 (29.1)	4.9 (40.8)	8.8 (47.8)	8.3 (46.9)	4.3 (39.7)	−0.7 (30.7)	−8.3 (17.1)	−18.1 (−0.6)	−7.1 (19.2)
Record low °C (°F)	−40.9 (−41.6)	−44.6 (−48.3)	−39.7 (−39.5)	−31.4 (−24.5)	−22.6 (−8.7)	−6.6 (20.1)	−0.9 (30.4)	−0.5 (31.1)	−7.0 (19.4)	−16.7 (1.9)	−29.2 (−20.6)	−40.3 (−40.5)	−44.6 (−48.3)
Record low wind chill	−56.0	−56.9	−51.2	−40.1	−27.0	−12.5	−3.4	−6.5	−10.3	−19.7	−40.3	−52.9	−56.9
Average precipitation mm (inches)	31.0 (1.22)	22.2 (0.87)	27.9 (1.10)	29.2 (1.15)	43.8 (1.72)	61.7 (2.43)	85.6 (3.37)	89.7 (3.53)	110.3 (4.34)	88.5 (3.48)	68.1 (2.68)	43.9 (1.73)	701.9 (27.63)
Average rainfall mm (inches)	1.1 (0.04)	1.2 (0.05)	3.4 (0.13)	9.3 (0.37)	34.6 (1.36)	60.0 (2.36)	85.6 (3.37)	90.9 (3.58)	107.0 (4.21)	62.5 (2.46)	15.2 (0.60)	1.7 (0.07)	472.5 (18.60)
Average snowfall cm (inches)	30.4 (12.0)	21.6 (8.5)	24.7 (9.7)	19.9 (7.8)	9.5 (3.7)	2.3 (0.9)	0.0 (0.0)	0.0 (0.0)	3.4 (1.3)	26.4 (10.4)	54.5 (21.5)	43.0 (16.9)	235.7 (92.8)
Average precipitation days (≥ 0.2 mm)	16.6	11.7	11.4	10.5	13.1	11.7	15.2	15.8	20.1	20.7	22.3	20.1	189.1
Average rainy days (≥ 0.2 mm)	0.42	0.68	1.0	3.7	9.3	11.4	15.2	15.9	19.5	13.7	5.0	1.4	97.2
Average snowy days (≥ 0.2 cm)	16.5	11.6	10.8	8.5	5.7	1.2	0.04	0.0	1.5	10.5	20.3	19.8	106.4
Average relative humidity (%) (at 1500 LST)	74.4	67.3	59.7	56.6	54.0	49.8	56.6	60.2	68.8	76.3	84.5	81.8	65.8
Source: Environment and Climate Change Canada

== See also ==
- James Bay Project
- List of longest rivers of Canada
