= Radisson, Quebec =

Radisson
- Unconstituted locality
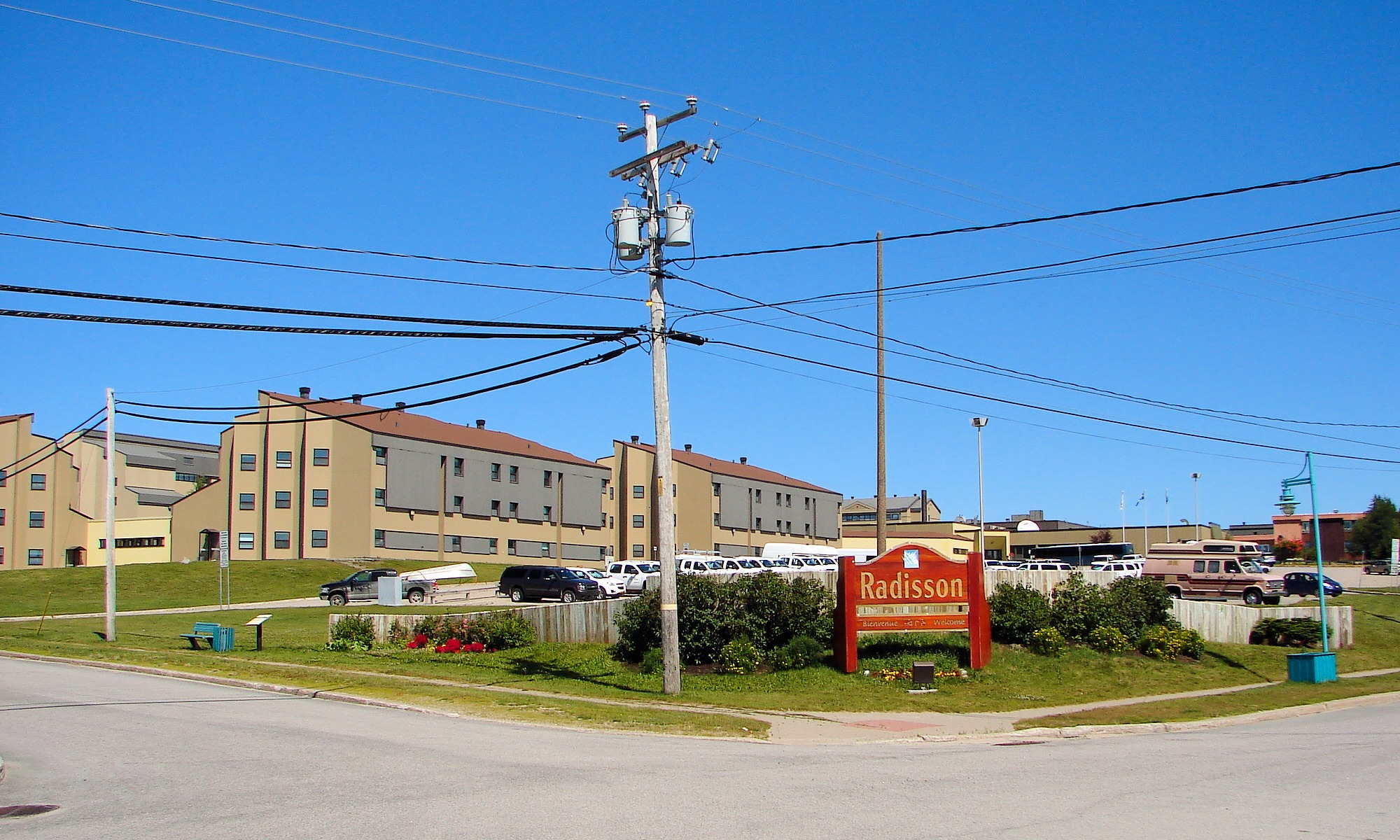

- Location within Quebec
- Coordinates: 53°47′30″N 77°37′00″W
- Country: Canada
- Province: Quebec
- Region: Nord-du-Québec
- TE: Jamésie
- Municipality: Eeyou Istchee Baie-James
- Settled: 1975

Government
  - Federal riding: Abitibi—Baie-James—Nunavik—Eeyou
  - Prov. riding: Ungava

Area
  - Land: 4.83 km^{2} (1.86 sq mi)

Population (2021)
  - Total: 203
  - Density: 42.1/km^{2} (109/sq mi)
  - Change (2016–21): ▼56.6%
  - Dwellings: 235
- Time zone: UTC−05:00 (EST)
  - Summer (DST): UTC−04:00 (EDT)
- Postal Code: J0Y 2X0
- Area code: 819

Radisson is a small unconstituted locality situated near the Robert-Bourassa hydroelectric power station on the La Grande River in the municipality of Eeyou Istchee Baie-James in Quebec, Canada. Geographically, Radisson is located halfway between the southern and northernmost points in Quebec and is, besides Schefferville, the only non-native town north of the 53rd parallel in the province.

Despite its remoteness, Radisson has plenty of services for its residents and travellers: two fuel stations, hotel, motel, campground (summer only), a general store, restaurants, gift shops, a school and a hospital. It is also home to a huge Hydro-Québec employee facility, from where guided tours to the Robert-Bourassa power station start. It also houses employees of Air Inuit who are stationed at La Grande Rivière Airport.

== History ==
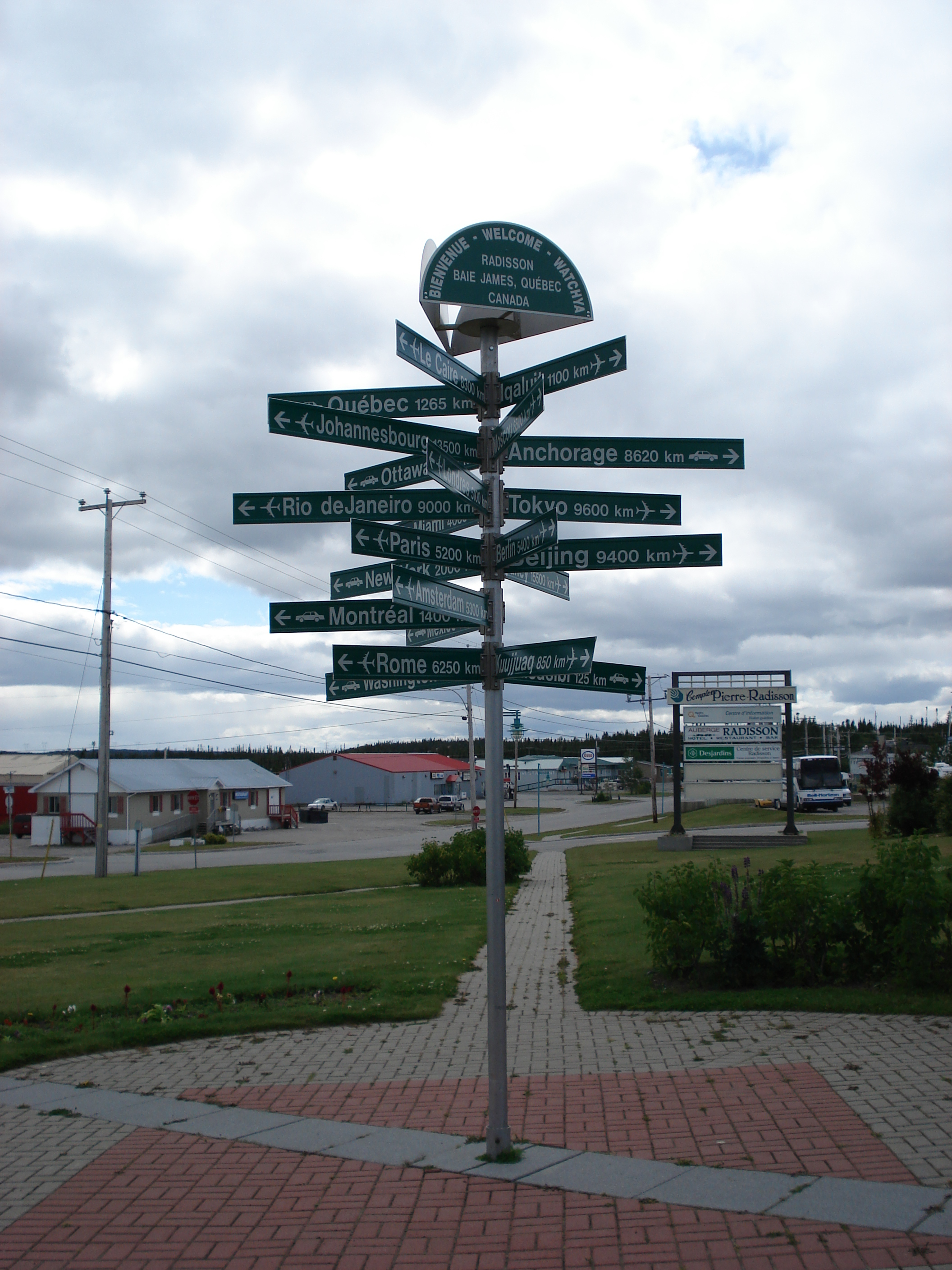
Novelty signpost in the centre of Radisson

Radisson was founded in 1974 to accommodate workers for the James Bay hydroelectric project and named by the Société de développement de la Baie James after Pierre-Esprit Radisson, a 17th-century French explorer and founder of the Hudson's Bay Company. During the peak construction period in 1977, its population reached about 2,500 and has fluctuated since that time. Currently it is a community of about 300 people. The main employer is Hydro-Québec and its main subsidiary, the Société de l'énergie de la Baie James. Many locals are also employed in the tourism/hospitality industry that caters especially to the outdoor sports, such as hunting, fishing, and camping.

Radisson, also referred to on some unofficial maps as "La Grande", is part of the Municipality of Baie-James which covers most of the territory of James Bay region, with the exception of the Cree villages as well as towns of Chapais, Chibougamau, Matagami and Lebel-sur-Quévillon, all of which are enclaves.

The town is accessible by road from Matagami, 620 km (390 mi) to the south. The road is known as the James Bay Road (French: Route de la Baie James) and was built during the construction of the James Bay Project in the mid-1970s. No services whatsoever are available along this road with the exception of a 24-hour service station, complete with cafeteria and lodging, at kilometre 381. The road is fully paved, well maintained and ploughed during the winter, making Radisson accessible year-round. It is also accessible via La Grande Rivière Airport.

== Geography ==
The Cree village of Chisasibi is about 100 km (62 mi) to the west, near the mouth of the La Grande River. To the East is the Trans-Taiga Road (French: Route Transtaïga) that leads to the Caniapiscau Reservoir and the former construction camp of Caniapiscau (now used by a wilderness outfitter).

=== Climate ===
Climate data for La Grande Rivière (La Grande Rivière Airport) WMO ID: 71827; coordinates 53°38′N 77°42′W; elevation: 195.1 m (640 ft); 1991–2020 normals, extremes 1976–present
Month	Jan	Feb	Mar	Apr	May	Jun	Jul	Aug	Sep	Oct	Nov	Dec	Year
Record high humidex	3.0	4.8	12.0	21.8	33.9	38.0	44.3	35.5	31.6	28.3	13.4	7.6	44.3
Record high °C (°F)	3.3 (37.9)	5.0 (41.0)	11.8 (53.2)	22.3 (72.1)	32.6 (90.7)	35.0 (95.0)	37.3 (99.1)	31.2 (88.2)	28.3 (82.9)	23.5 (74.3)	12.3 (54.1)	7.4 (45.3)	37.3 (99.1)
Mean daily maximum °C (°F)	−17.2 (1.0)	−15.4 (4.3)	−7.9 (17.8)	0.5 (32.9)	10.1 (50.2)	18.1 (64.6)	20.7 (69.3)	18.8 (65.8)	12.9 (55.2)	5.5 (41.9)	−2.5 (27.5)	−10.8 (12.6)	2.7 (36.9)
Daily mean °C (°F)	−21.7 (−7.1)	−20.8 (−5.4)	−14.0 (6.8)	−5.1 (22.8)	4.3 (39.7)	11.5 (52.7)	14.8 (58.6)	13.6 (56.5)	8.6 (47.5)	2.4 (36.3)	−5.4 (22.3)	−14.5 (5.9)	−2.2 (28.0)
Mean daily minimum °C (°F)	−26.1 (−15.0)	−26.1 (−15.0)	−20.0 (−4.0)	−10.6 (12.9)	−1.6 (29.1)	4.9 (40.8)	8.8 (47.8)	8.3 (46.9)	4.3 (39.7)	−0.7 (30.7)	−8.3 (17.1)	−18.1 (−0.6)	−7.1 (19.2)
Record low °C (°F)	−40.9 (−41.6)	−44.6 (−48.3)	−39.7 (−39.5)	−31.4 (−24.5)	−22.6 (−8.7)	−6.6 (20.1)	−0.9 (30.4)	−0.5 (31.1)	−7.0 (19.4)	−16.7 (1.9)	−29.2 (−20.6)	−40.3 (−40.5)	−44.6 (−48.3)
Record low wind chill	−56.0	−56.9	−51.2	−40.1	−27.0	−12.5	−3.4	−6.5	−10.3	−19.7	−40.3	−52.9	−56.9
Average precipitation mm (inches)	31.0 (1.22)	22.2 (0.87)	27.9 (1.10)	29.2 (1.15)	43.8 (1.72)	61.7 (2.43)	85.6 (3.37)	89.7 (3.53)	110.3 (4.34)	88.5 (3.48)	68.1 (2.68)	43.9 (1.73)	701.9 (27.63)
Average rainfall mm (inches)	1.1 (0.04)	1.2 (0.05)	3.4 (0.13)	9.3 (0.37)	34.6 (1.36)	60.0 (2.36)	85.6 (3.37)	90.9 (3.58)	107.0 (4.21)	62.5 (2.46)	15.2 (0.60)	1.7 (0.07)	472.5 (18.60)
Average snowfall cm (inches)	30.4 (12.0)	21.6 (8.5)	24.7 (9.7)	19.9 (7.8)	9.5 (3.7)	2.3 (0.9)	0.0 (0.0)	0.0 (0.0)	3.4 (1.3)	26.4 (10.4)	54.5 (21.5)	43.0 (16.9)	235.7 (92.8)
Average precipitation days (≥ 0.2 mm)	16.6	11.7	11.4	10.5	13.1	11.7	15.2	15.8	20.1	20.7	22.3	20.1	189.1
Average rainy days (≥ 0.2 mm)	0.42	0.68	1.0	3.7	9.3	11.4	15.2	15.9	19.5	13.7	5.0	1.4	97.2
Average snowy days (≥ 0.2 cm)	16.5	11.6	10.8	8.5	5.7	1.2	0.04	0.0	1.5	10.5	20.3	19.8	106.4
Average relative humidity (%) (at 1500 LST)	74.4	67.3	59.7	56.6	54.0	49.8	56.6	60.2	68.8	76.3	84.5	81.8	65.8
Source: Environment and Climate Change Canada

== Demographics ==
In the 2021 Census of Population conducted by Statistics Canada, Radisson had a population of 203 living in 105 of its 235 total private dwellings, a change of −56.6% from its 2016 population of 468. With a land area of 4.83 km^{2} (1.86 sq mi), it had a population density of 42.0/km^{2} (108.9/sq mi) in 2021.
