= Nemiscau River =

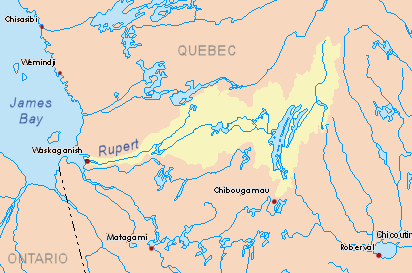
- Watershed of Rupert River

Location
- Country: Canada
- Province: Quebec
- Region: Nord-du-Québec

Physical characteristics
- Source
  - location: Eeyou Istchee Baie-James, Nord-du-Québec, Quebec
  - coordinates: 52°2′40″N 74°55′20″W
  - elevation: 1,191 m (3,907 ft)
- Mouth: Lake Nemiscau
  - location: Eeyou Istchee Baie-James, Nord-du-Québec, Quebec, Canada
  - coordinates: 50°14′44″N 73°48′57″W
- Length: 180 km (110 mi)
- Basin size: 3,015 km^{2} (1,164 sq mi)

The Nemiscau River is a river flowing in the municipality of Baie-James, an administrative region of Nord-du-Québec, in Quebec, Canada.

== Geography ==
The Nemiscau River flows into Lake Nemiscau. The Nemiscau River flows over 100 kilometres (62 mi) northeast to southwest in the Nord-du-Québec (administrative region) passing south of the hamlet of Nemaska.

The river takes its waters from a set of lakes to the east and southeast of the Eastmain Reservoir; the upper lake is 5.7 kilometres (3.5 mi) of Eastmain or at the east of a highest peak at 450 metres (1,480 ft). In this very complex headwaters, the river passes through numerous lakes and marshes, such as Cramoisy lakes, Teilhard, Biggar and Mountains.

Neighboring hydrographic watersheds are:

- North side: Pontax River, Eastmain River, Eastmain Reservoir;
- South side: Rupert River;
- West side: Lake Nemiscau.

At the end of its course, the river flows into the northern edge of Lake Nemiscau, which matches the shape of a U open towards the northeast. The other end of this U receives waters from Rupert River. Lake Nemiscau is north of Lake Giffard and Lake Evans, and south of Jolliet Lake.

== Toponymy ==
In 1672, the explorer Charles Albanel (Catholic priest) had given the name "Nemiskausipiou" to name what is today the Rupert River. During his 1679 trip, Louis Jolliet was also used "Nemisco" to describe the current Rupert River. Handwritten notes indicate Jolliet, "My land was entered by the Saguenay, which comes close to a large lake, named "Timigaming" (the Lake Mistassini), the source River Némiskau (ie Rupert), which discharges into the North Bay (the James Bay), on which I made my way to the sea."

The "Nemiscau" name designating the current river has been in use since the 1940s. Because of upwelling, this river became the Nemiscau Lake, before the waters join the Rupert River. In 1982, the Commission de toponymie du Québec (English: Quebec Names Board) formalized the movement toponymique pointing this river "Rivière Nemiscau".

In 1690, maps refer to the name "Rupert" which refers to the river and the fort. Subsequently, the maps of Claude-Charles Bacqueville de La Potherie use the spelling "R. Rupert" and those of Father Laure in 1731–1732 "R. Rupert." In 1744, Nicolas Bellin also uses graphieu "R. Nemiscau".

Later, the name "Rupert River" prevailed until the 20th century. The place name Nemiscau was recovered, but moving to the northeast to identify the branch of the river remained unnamed until the 1940s.

Cree language, the term "Nemiscau" means "where fish are abundant". "François R." on the map entitled "Party of New France" by Alexis Jaillot, Paris, 1685. "Miskoutenagachit" is on the "Map of Canada or New France and discoveries that were there made" by Guillaume Delisle, Paris 1703. The map "A New and Exact Map of the Dominions of the King of great Britain on ye continent of North America" ([London], 1715, revised in 1732 or after) shows "Miskautenagachit R".

The place name Nemiscau River was formalized on Dec. 2, 1982, to the Bank of place names in Commission de toponymie du Québec (Quebec Names Board).

== See also ==
- Baie-James, a municipality
- Rupert River, a watercourse
- Eastmain River, a watercourse
- Lake Nemiscau, a body of water
- Charles Albanel, French Jesuit priest, missionary and explorer in New France
- Louis Jolliet, a French explorer in New France.
- Jamésie
- Rupert River
- List of rivers of Quebec
