= Caniapiscau (disambiguation) =

Caniapiscau is an unorganized territory in the Canadian province of Quebec.

Caniapiscau may also refer to:

- Caniapiscau Regional County Municipality, Quebec
- Caniapiscau River, a river in the Ungava Bay watershed
- Caniapiscau Reservoir, a reservoir on the upper Caniapiscau River in the Côte-Nord administrative region
- Caniapiscau Aerodrome, located near Caniapiscau
