= James Bay Road =

Highway in Quebec

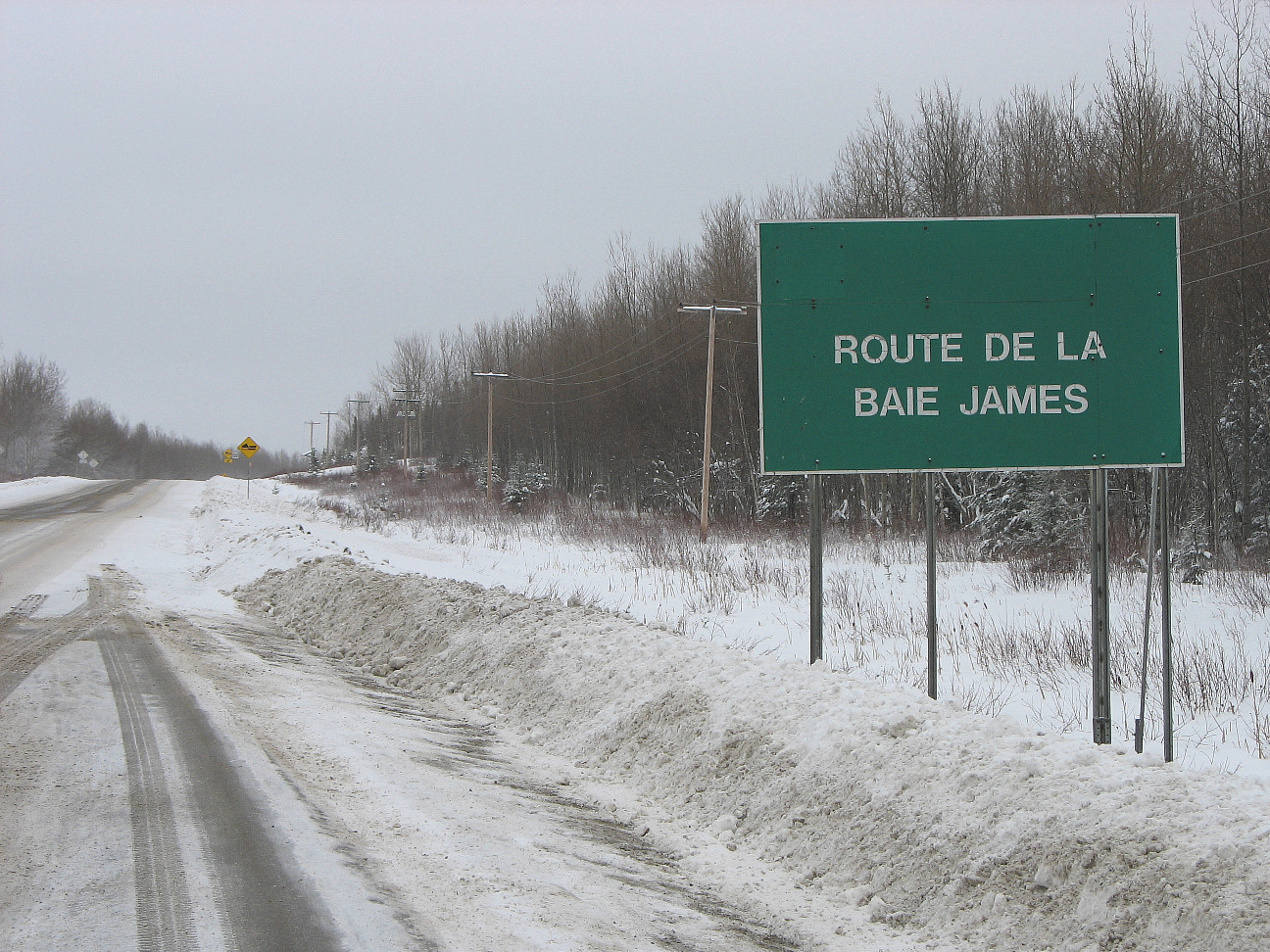
Start of the James Bay Road

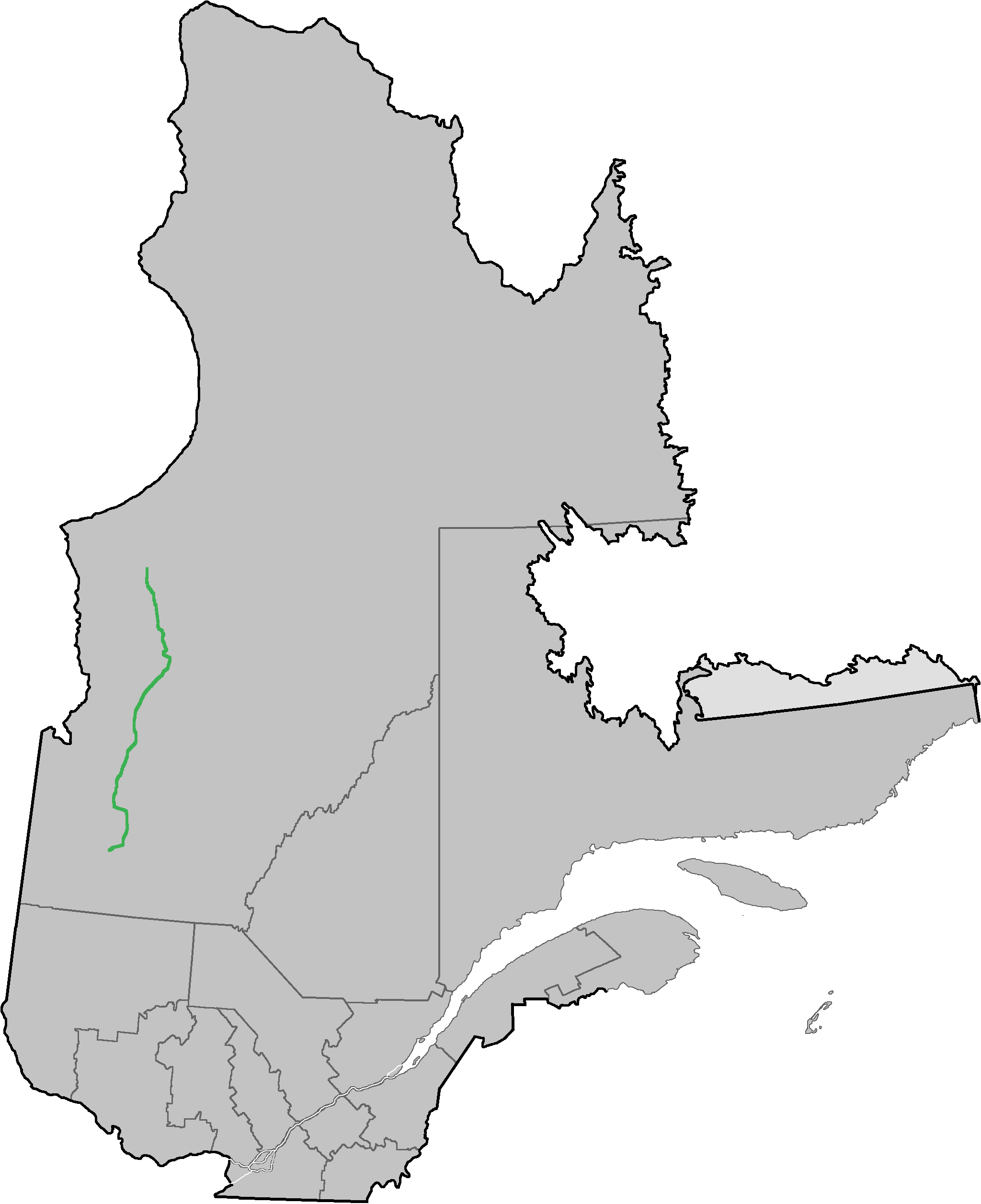
Map of James Bay Road in Quebec

The James Bay Road (French: Route de la Baie James), officially the Billy-Diamond Highway (French: Route Billy-Diamond), is a remote wilderness highway winding its way through the Canadian Shield in northwestern Quebec and reaches into the James Bay region. It starts in Matagami as an extension of Route 109 and ends at Radisson. The road is fully paved, well maintained, and plowed during the winter. It was originally constructed to carry loads of 300 tons and has mostly gentle curves and hills with wide shoulders. The road is maintained by the Eeyou Istchee James Bay Regional Government (formerly by the municipality of Baie-James). Connecting to other routes such as the Trans-Taiga Road and the Route du Nord, the highway draws tourists interested in reaching the remote wilderness surrounding James Bay, part of Hudson Bay.

On November 10, 2020, the James Bay Road was renamed in honour of Billy Diamond, former Grand Chief of the Grand Council of the Crees and chief Cree negotiator of the James Bay and Northern Quebec Agreement.

There is currently a proposal supported by the region's Cree communities to build a gravel extension some 250 kilometres (160 mi) farther north to the twin communities on the Great Whale River: the Cree village of Whapmagoostui and the northern (primarily Inuit) village of Kuujjuarapik, in the Nunavik region.

== History ==
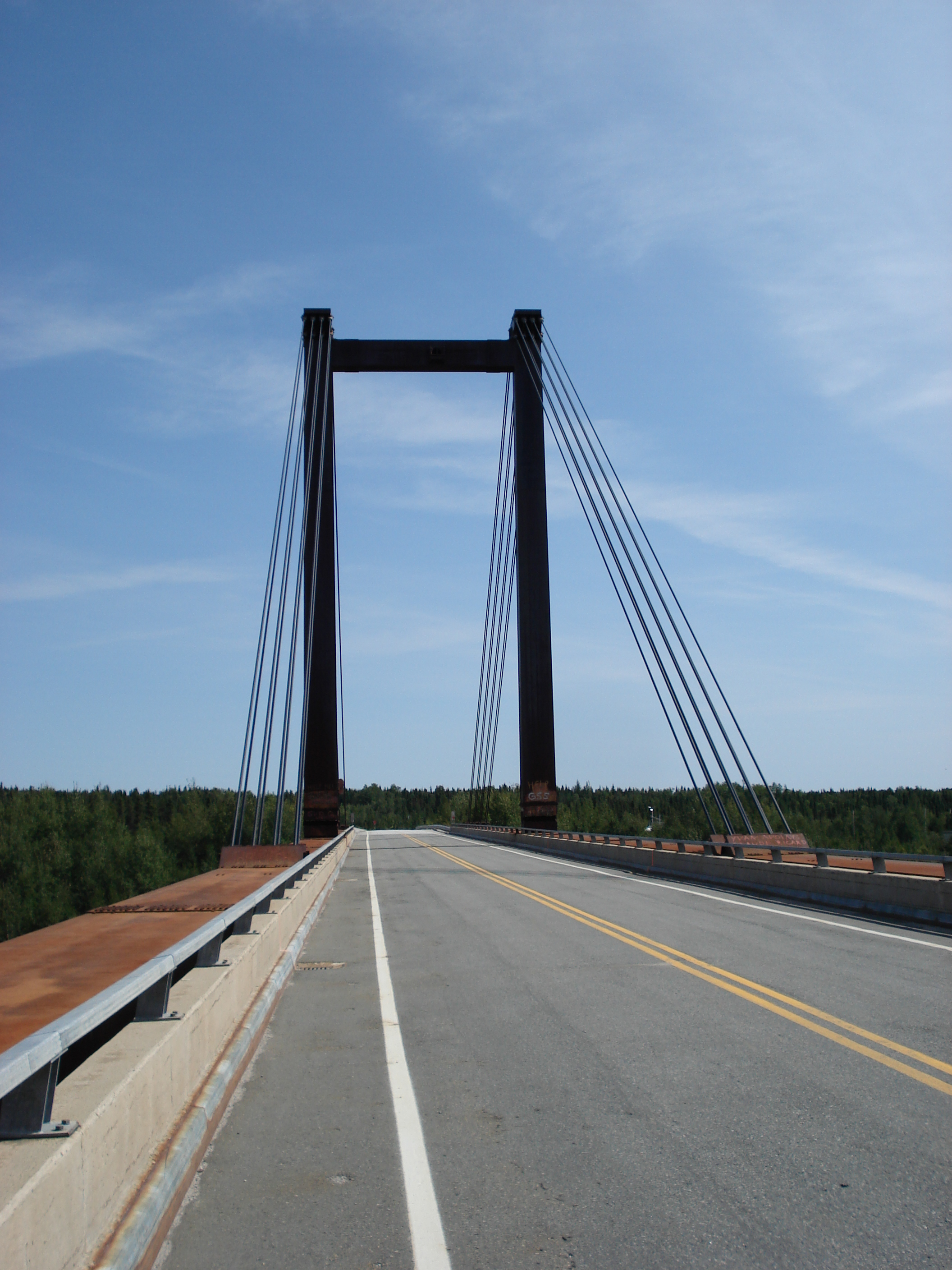
Bridge over the Rupert River.

The James Bay Road was conceived as an access road for the hydroelectric projects developed in the James Bay region in the 1970s and onwards. Construction began in 1971 and was completed in October 1974. Gravel branch routes have since been built from the highway, including four roads west to Cree villages on or near James Bay (the one to Chisasibi is paved for most of the way). The Trans-Taiga Road (French: Route Transtaïga) was built and reached Caniapiscau in 1979. The 406 kilometres (252 mi) long Route du Nord (North Road), which also is not a numbered route, connects from km 275 (measured from Matagami) southeast to near Chibougamau, Quebec.

== Route Description ==
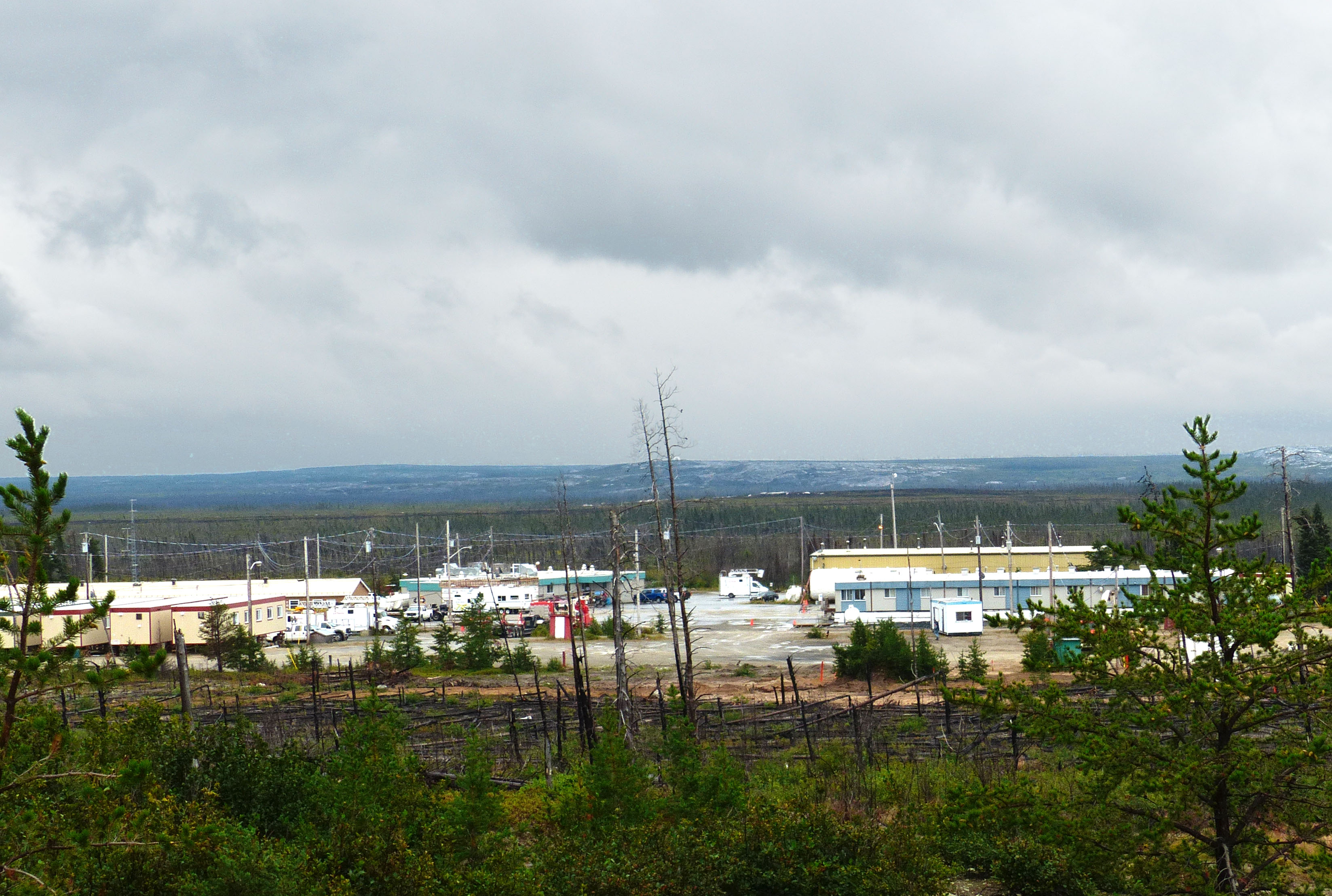
Relais Routier Km 381

There are no services and development along the James Bay Road except for a full-service station at 381 kilometres (237 mi) from Matagami. The station, located at kilometre marker 381, is operational 24 hours per day, 7 days per week, and is complete with a cafeteria and rudimentary lodging.

Because of the remote nature of the road, there is a registration office along the side of the road for travellers to register. Located a few kilometers north of Matagami, it is staffed 24 hours per day, 7 days per week, and also serves as a tourist office for the communities along or off the James Bay Road.

As further safety provisions, there are six roadside emergency telephones, which connect with staff in the registration office.

== Municipalities along Billy-Diamond Road ==
- Matagami
- Eeyou Istchee Baie-James

== Junction List ==
Km	Mi	
0	0	Matagami, km 0 marker for James Bay Road
6	3.7	Checkpoint for registration office
135	83.9	Emergency telephone
201	125	Emergency telephone
232	144	Bridge crossing the Broadback River
237	147	Junction with road to Waskaganish, 102 km (63 mi) west
247	153	Emergency telephone
257	160	Bridge crossing the Rupert River
275	171	Junction with the North Road, highway through Nemaska (117 km (73 mi) east) to Chibougamau (440 km (270 mi) east)
301	187	Emergency telephone
351	218	Junction with road to Eastmain, 103 km (64 mi) west
381	236	Relais 381, 24-hr service station
395	245	Bridge crossing the Eastmain River
411	255	Bridge crossing the Opinaca River
444	276	Emergency telephone
504	313	Emergency telephone
518	322	Junction with road to Wemindji, 96 km (60 mi) west
544	338	Junction with Trans-Taiga Road, 582 km (362 mi) east to Brisay, and an additional rough 84 km (52 mi) suitable only for four-wheel drive vehicles, no services; the road ends approximately 160 km (99 mi) west from Labrador, near Schefferville, Quebec
589	366	La Grande Rivière Airport, serving Radisson, Quebec
600	373	Junction with road to Chisasibi, 90 km (56 mi) west
617	383	Junction with access road to Radisson, 5 km (3.1 mi)
620	385	End of road - Hydro-Québec controlled-access roads from here into Robert Bourassa Power Station.

== Image gallery ==
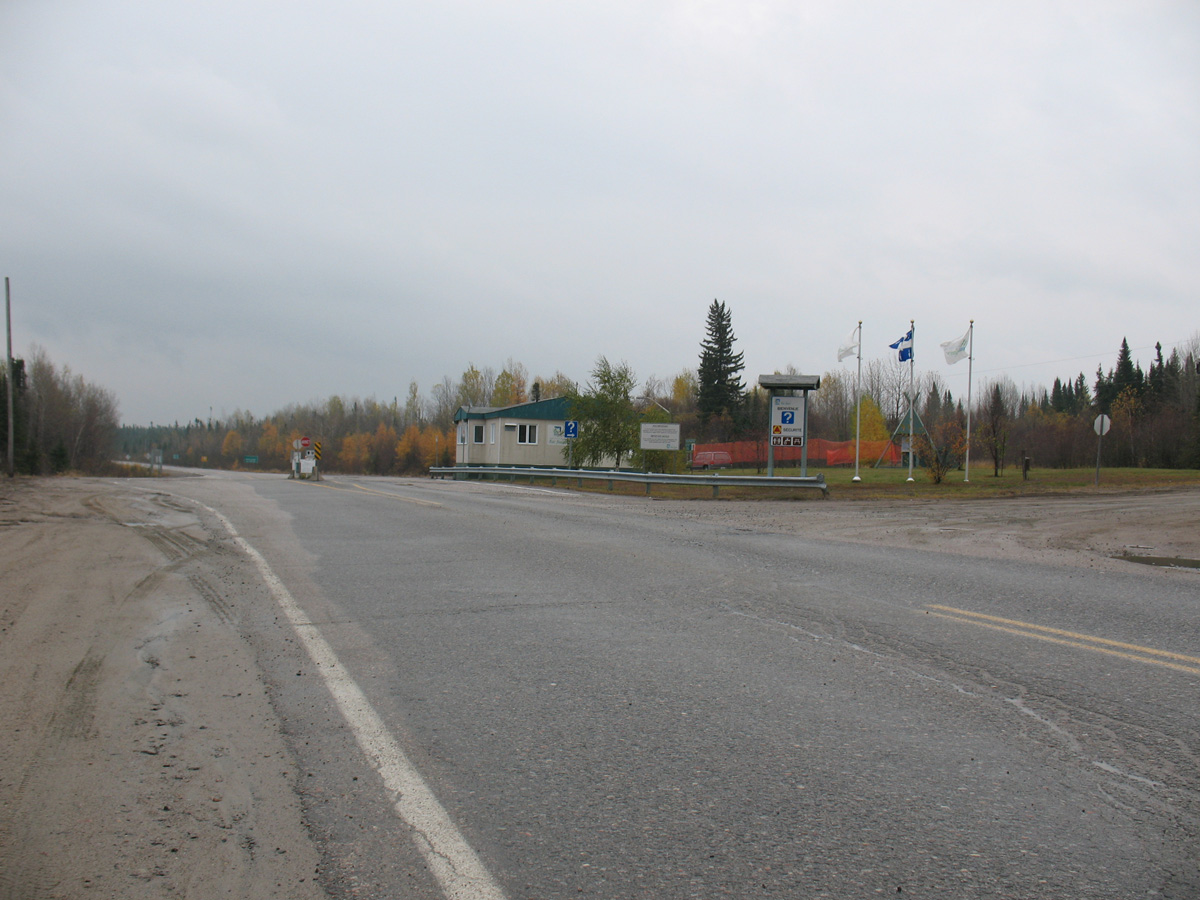
The James Bay Road Check Point

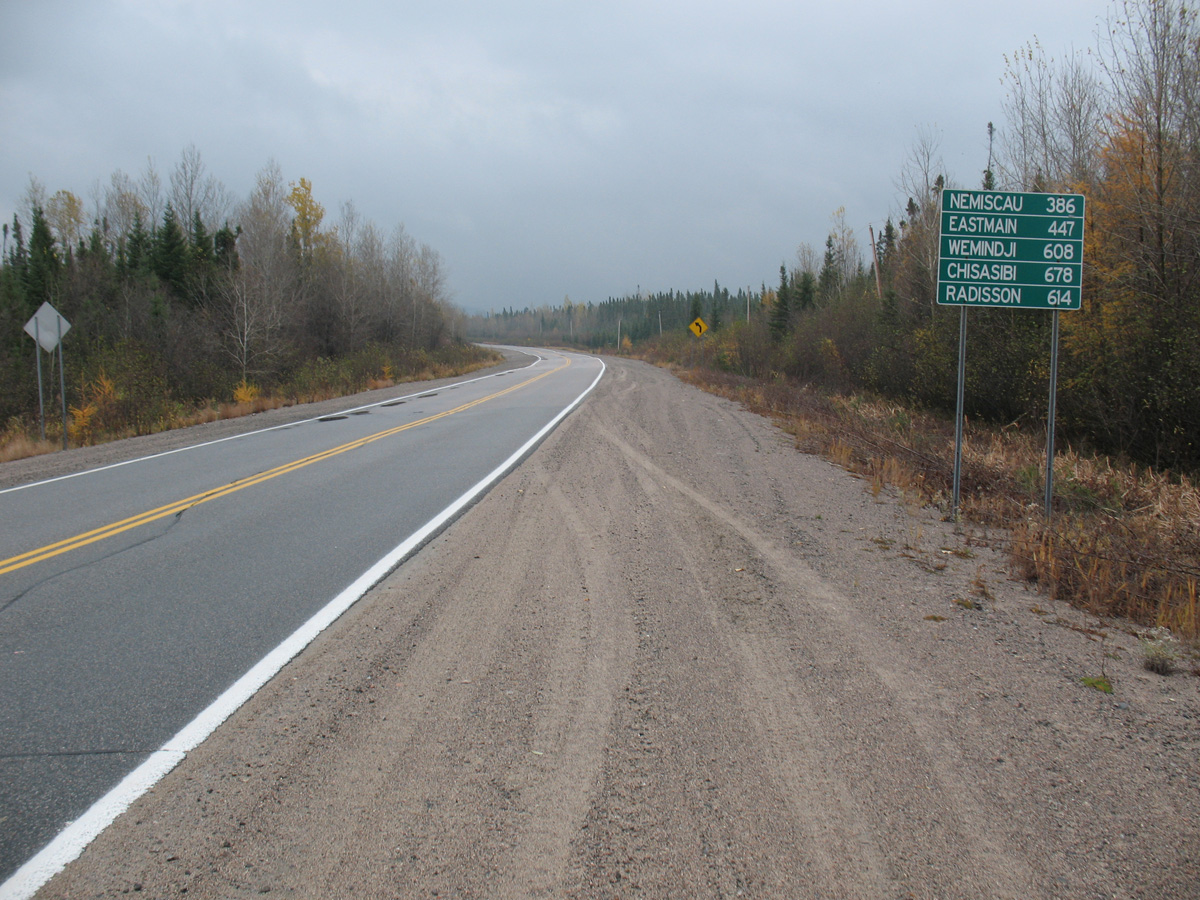
Distances to each town, from the Check Point.

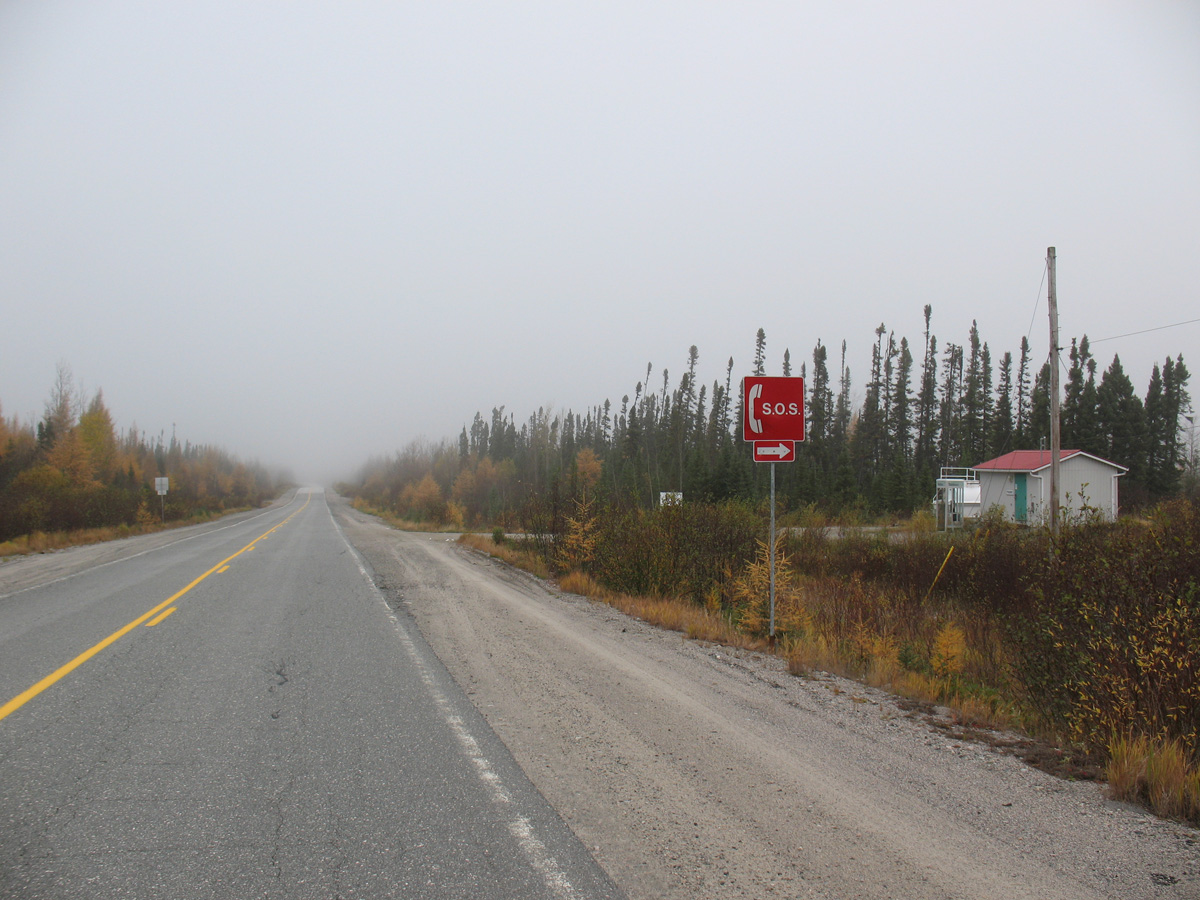
S.O.S. phone stations along the James Bay Road

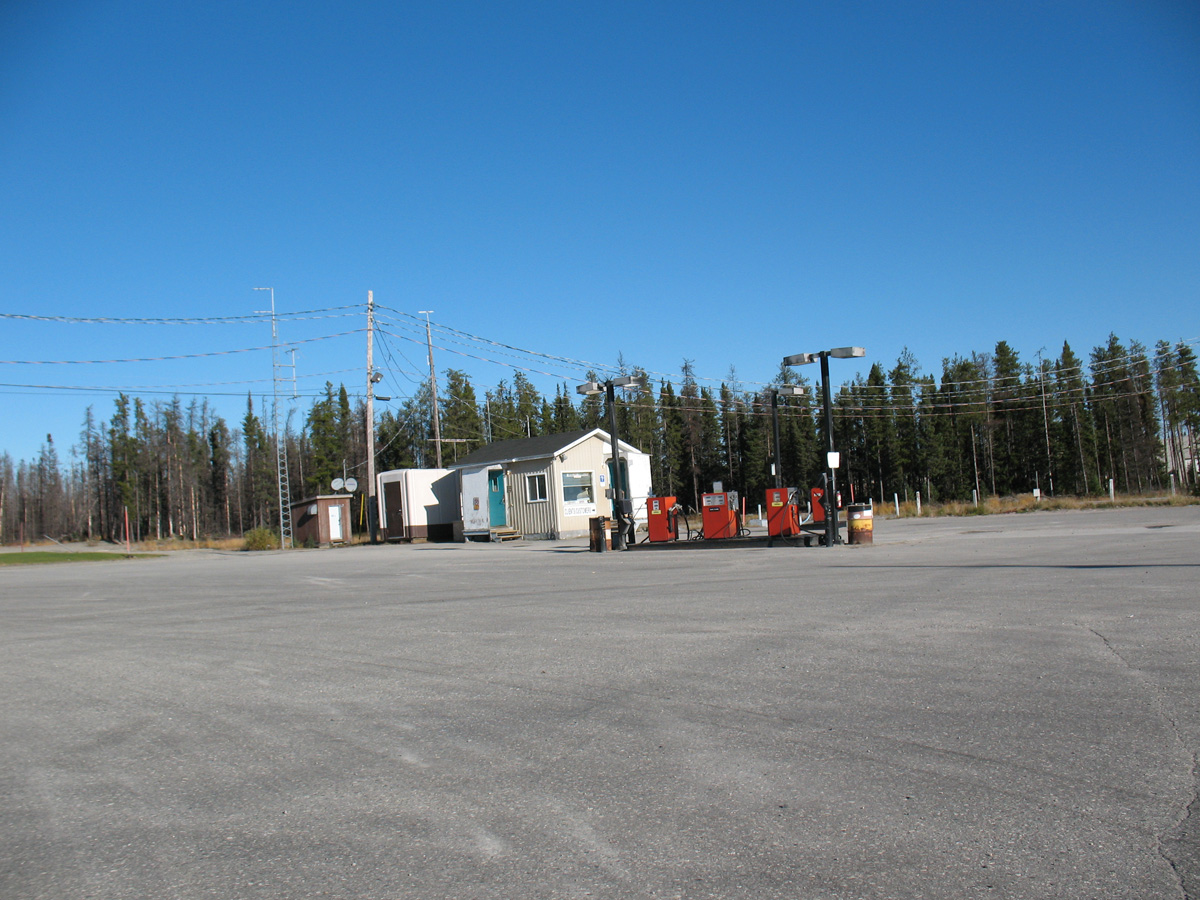
James Bay Road fuel station

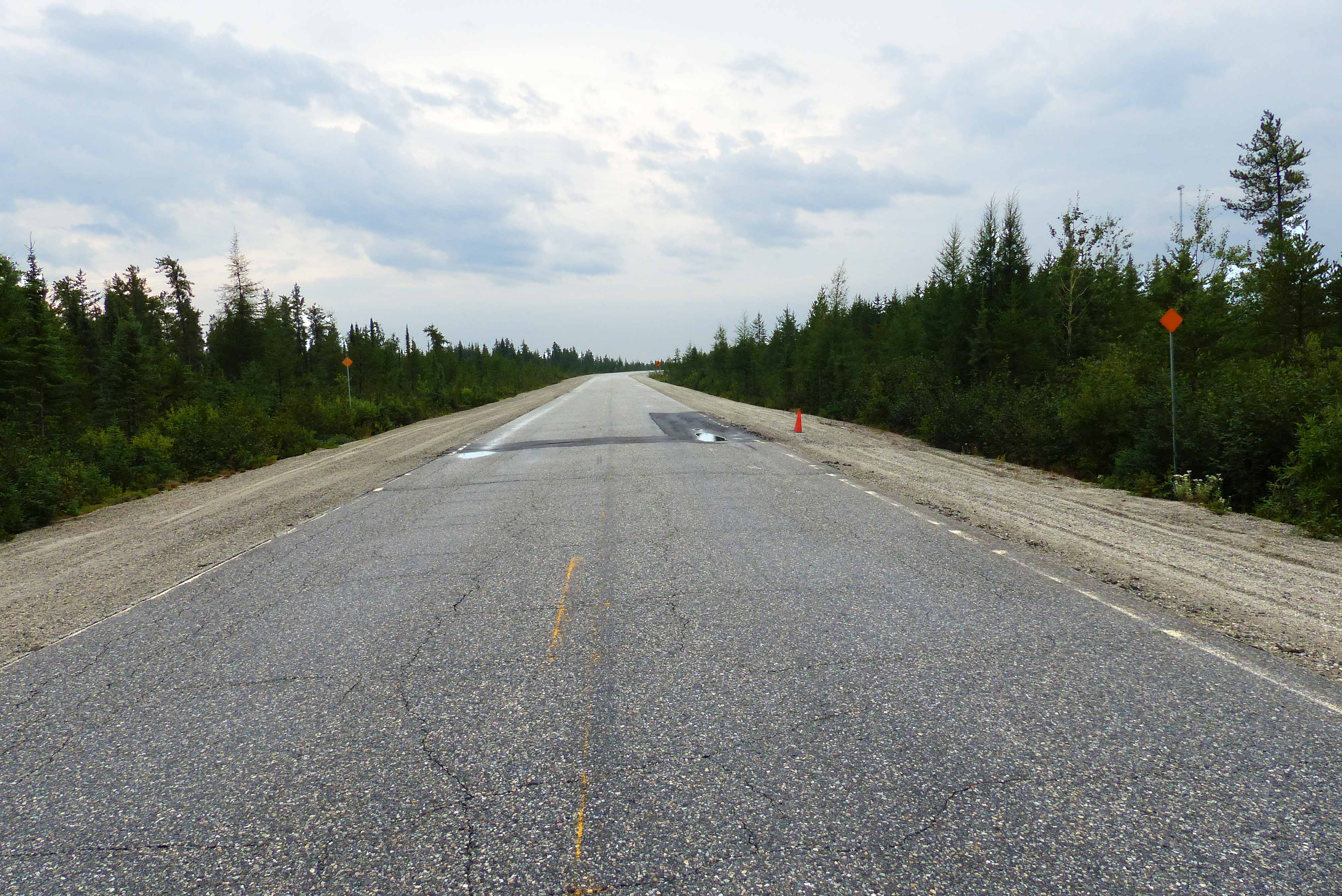
Road hazard

== See also ==
- List of Quebec provincial highways
