= Trans-Taiga Road =

Road in Quebec

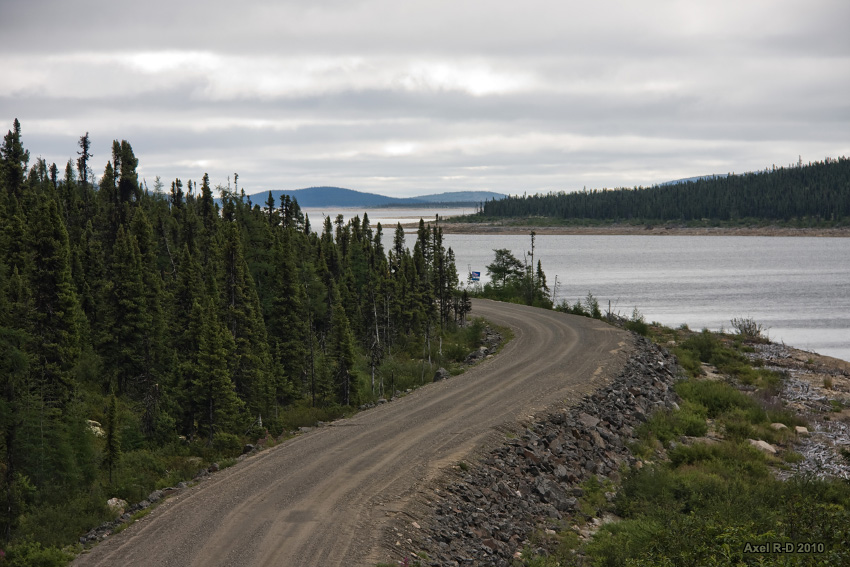
The Transtaiga Road at the Caniapiscau Reservoir

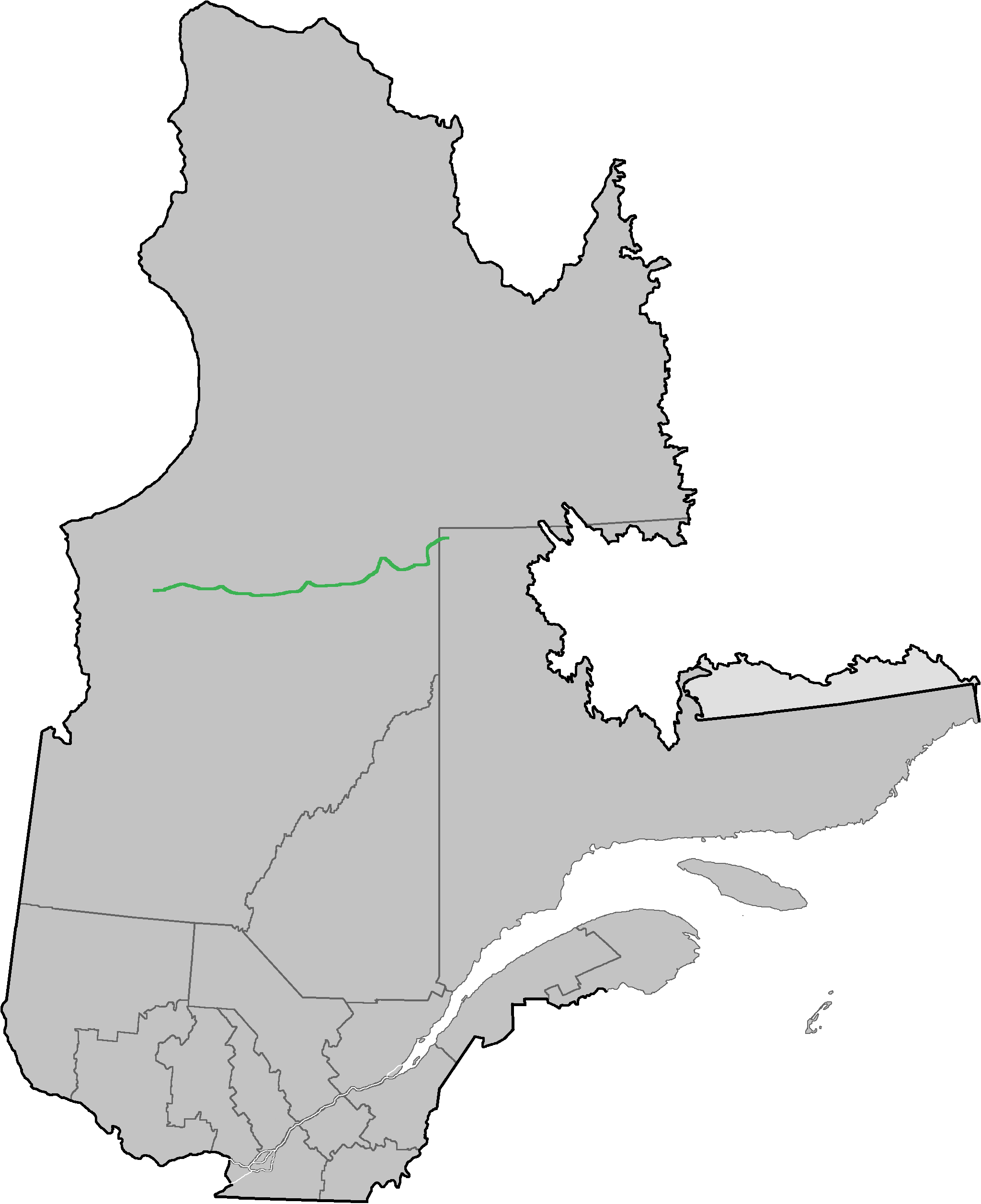
Map of Trans-Taiga Road in Quebec

The Trans-Taiga Road (French: Route Transtaïga) is an extremely remote wilderness road in northern Quebec, Canada. It is 582 kilometres (362 mi) long to Centrale Brisay and another 84 kilometres (52 mi) along the Caniapiscau Reservoir. The entire road is unpaved.

The road begins at 53.323336°N 77.445122°W (km 544 of the James Bay Road) and ends at 54.827814°N 69.857950°W, on the shores of the Caniapiscau Reservoir.

== Description ==
The road's northeastern terminus is almost at the 55th parallel north, making it the northernmost continuous road in Eastern North America. Though the terminus is also the furthest point from any town via road in North America (745 kilometres or 463 miles from Radisson), is nonetheless relatively close – 190 kilometres (120 mi) – to Schefferville geographically. It does not, however, provide access to it, as the intervening terrain is impassable even in an all-terrain vehicle. The road's end is also close to the southern limit of Nunavik.

The Trans-Taiga Road branches off from the James Bay Road (French: Route de la Baie James) at kilometre 544. It was built as an access road to the hydro-electric generating stations of Hydro-Québec along the La Grande River and Caniapiscau River. Several outfitters are established along this road, providing wilderness hunting and fishing expeditions, and some may also provide fuel, food and lodging. Otherwise, there are no services along this road.

While the Trans-Taiga Road is reportedly drivable by ordinary passenger vehicles for its entire length, Hydro-Québec recommends use of 4WD vehicles for the section between Brisay and Caniapiscau, which is of a rougher grade than the rest of the road.

As the name of the road indicates, this road winds its way through Quebec's vast boreal forest, characterized by stunted spruce and pine, bogs and rocky outcroppings. Taiga is the Russian term for the same type of forest.

== Municipalities along Trans-Taiga Road ==
- Eeyou Istchee Baie-James

== Extension ==
Regional and provincial officials have suggested building a link from the road's northeastern terminus in Caniapiscau to Kuujjuaq, several hundred kilometres to the north in Nunavik, also accessing Schefferville along the way. As the road east of Centrale Brisay is extremely rough (large rocks on the road surface), part of the existing road would also need upgrading. An extension via Schefferville would likely require crossing the province of Newfoundland and Labrador.

In 2020, a Memorandum of Understanding was signed between the James Bay Cree Nation of Eeyou Istchee and the Government of Québec. The MOU sets a roadmap for infrastructure development. Phase III of the Infrastructure program includes extension of the Trans-Taiga road eastward to connect with Schefferville, over an approximate distance of 200 km.

== Waypoints ==
Km	Mi	Description
0	0	Start of Trans-taiga Road at km 544 of the James Bay Road
23	14	Emergency telephone
56	35	Sakami Lake
62	39	Robert-Bourassa Reservoir
100	62	Junction with access road to La Grande-3 generating station, 30 km (19 mi) north
270	168	Junction with access road to Shaakichiuwaanaan lithium mining project site, 20 km (12 mi) south
286	178	CargAir depot, fuel available
292	181	La Grande-4 Airport
311	193	Junction with access road to La Grande-4 generating station, 5 km (3.1 mi) north
358	222	Mirage Outfitter and Pourvoirie Mirage Aerodrome, fuel available
395	245	Junction with access road to Laforge-1 generating station, 38 km (24 mi) north
525	326	Junction with access road to Laforge-2 generating station, 6 km (3.7 mi) north
582	362	Brisay generating station
666	414	End of Transtaiga Road, Caniapiscau Reservoir

== See also ==
- James Bay Project
- List of Quebec provincial highways
