= Lake Nemiscau =

Lake in Quebec, Canada

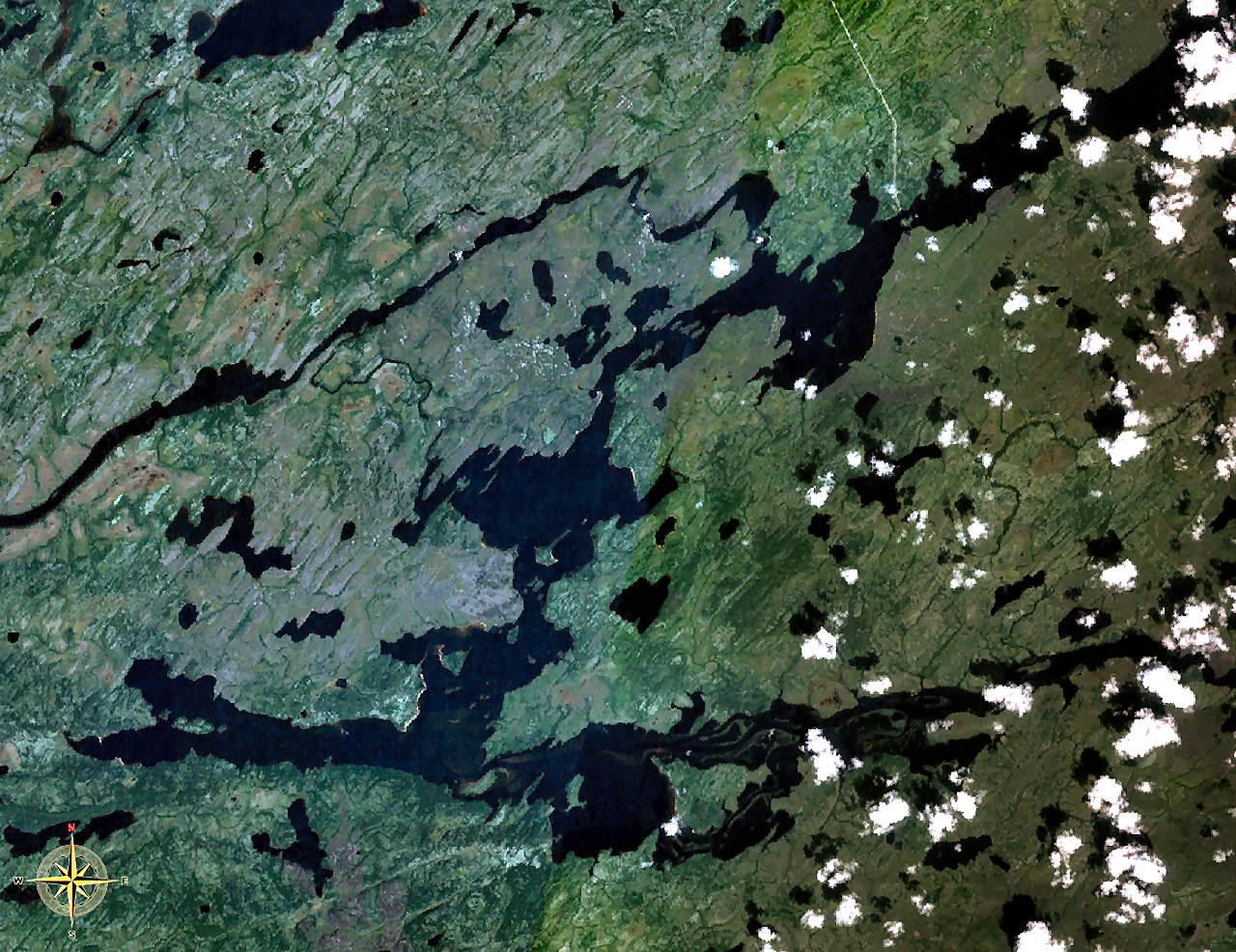
- Satellite view of Nemiscau Lake

- Location within Quebec
- Location: Baie-James, Jamésie Territory, Quebec
- Coordinates: 51°25′40″N 76°43′12″W
- Primary inflows: Rupert River, Nemiscau River
- Primary outflows: Rupert River
- Basin countries: Canada

Lake Nemiscau (in French: Lac Nemiscau) is a freshwater lake. It is located in the municipality of Eeyou Istchee James Bay, which is in the administrative region of Nord-du-Québec, in north-western Quebec, in Canada. The lake Nemiscau is crossed by Rupert River.

The abandoned settlement of Nemiscau is on the north shore, but in recent years, Cree people have been re-establishing Nemiscau as a summer residence. The nearest village is the town of Nemaska, about 60 kilometres (37 mi) northeast.

== Geography ==
Lake Nemiscau is crossed by Rupert River coming from South and also fed by Nemiscau River coming from East.

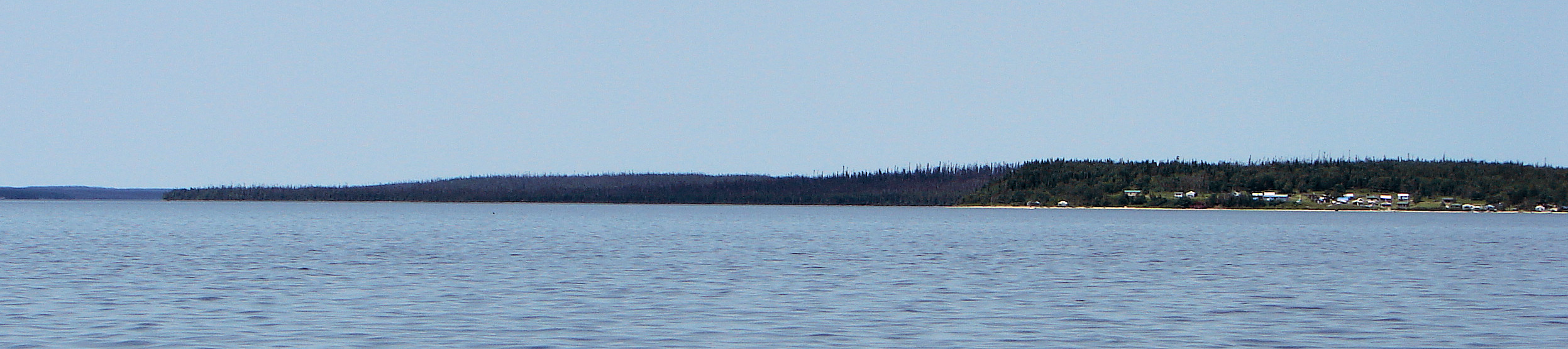
Lake Nemiscau with the settlement of Nemiscau on its shore.

== Toponymy ==
The place name Lake Nemiscau was formalized on December 2, 1982, by the Commission de toponymie du Québec (English: Quebec Names Board).

== See also ==
- Rupert Bay
- James Bay
