= Nemiscau =

Coordinates: 51°19′15″N 76°55′40″W

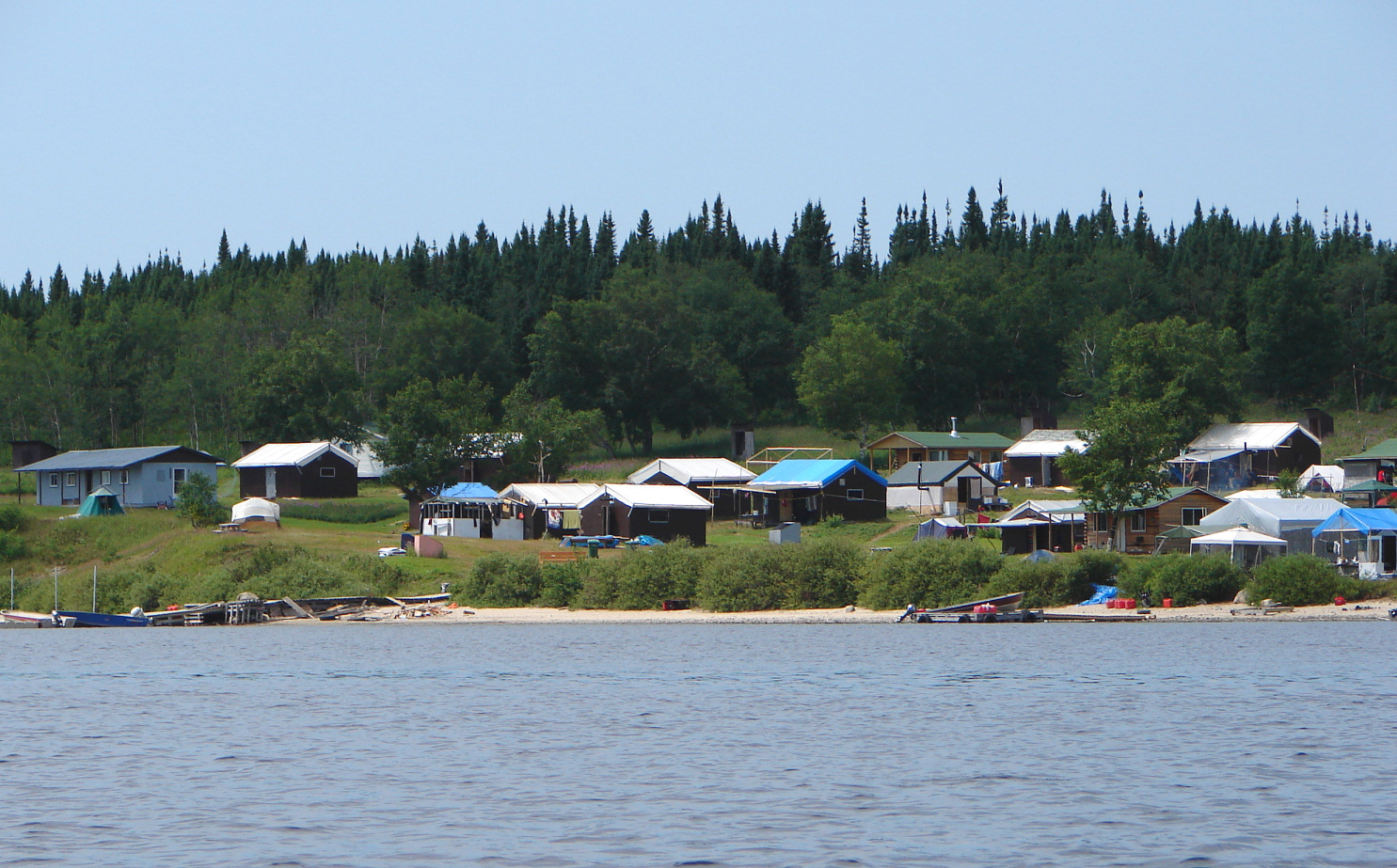
Nemiscau Cree settlement, summer 2006.

Nemiscau (or Old Nemaska) is a semi-permanent Cree settlement in northern Quebec, Canada, on Lake Nemiscau.

During the mid-twentieth century, Thomas Nelson Dodd Jr., PhD, an American professor of chemistry from St. Peter's College in New Jersey, encountered the Cree people living at Nemiscau as he was canoeing in the nearby waterways. He developed a friendship with the people, and returned every summer as a kind of one-man peace corps. During his years with the Cree, he documented their spoken dialect which had never been written, as well as their customs and habits. He persuaded the Canadian government to build modern housing for the Crees, and Dr. Dodd's work was substantial enough to merit a federal grant of $15,000 from the American Philosophic Society in 1961. Dr. Dodd returned to Nemiscau every summer until July 1965, when he perished in a plane crash en route to Nemiscau.

Nemiscau is the former site of a Hudson's Bay Company post until 1970. The settlement was abandoned in the mid-1970s when Hydro-Québec proposed hydro-electric development on the Rupert River, which would have resulted in the flooding of the area. Its residents were dispersed to Waskaganish and Mistissini until the new community of Nemaska was built. Since the development plans have been canceled, the Cree originally living here have started to return to Nemiscau, using it as a summer encampment. There are only a handful of year-round residents in Nemiscau.

== Climate ==
Nemiscau has a warm-summer humid continental climate (Köppen climate classification Dfb) with mild to warm summers with cool nights and freezing cold winters lasting half the year.

Climate data for Nemiscau
| Month | Jan | Feb | Mar | Apr | May | Jun | Jul | Aug | Sep | Oct | Nov | Dec | Year |
|---|---|---|---|---|---|---|---|---|---|---|---|---|---|
| Mean daily maximum °C (°F) | −13.0 (8.6) | −10.0 (14.0) | −3.2 (26.2) | 5.1 (41.2) | 14.8 (58.6) | 20.1 (68.2) | 21.9 (71.4) | 20.5 (68.9) | 16.1 (61.0) | 7.5 (45.5) | −0.1 (31.8) | −8.4 (16.9) | 5.9 (42.7) |
| Mean daily minimum °C (°F) | −23.2 (−9.8) | −21.5 (−6.7) | −15.5 (4.1) | −5.8 (21.6) | 2.0 (35.6) | 7.9 (46.2) | 10.8 (51.4) | 10.1 (50.2) | 6.2 (43.2) | 0.4 (32.7) | −5.9 (21.4) | −16.8 (1.8) | −4.3 (24.3) |
| Average precipitation days (≥ 1mm) | 7 | 8 | 7 | 7 | 8 | 9 | 11 | 10 | 10 | 10 | 10 | 11 | 108 |
Source: http://www.storm247.com/weather/105839292/climate
