= Route du Nord =

Road in Quebec, Canada

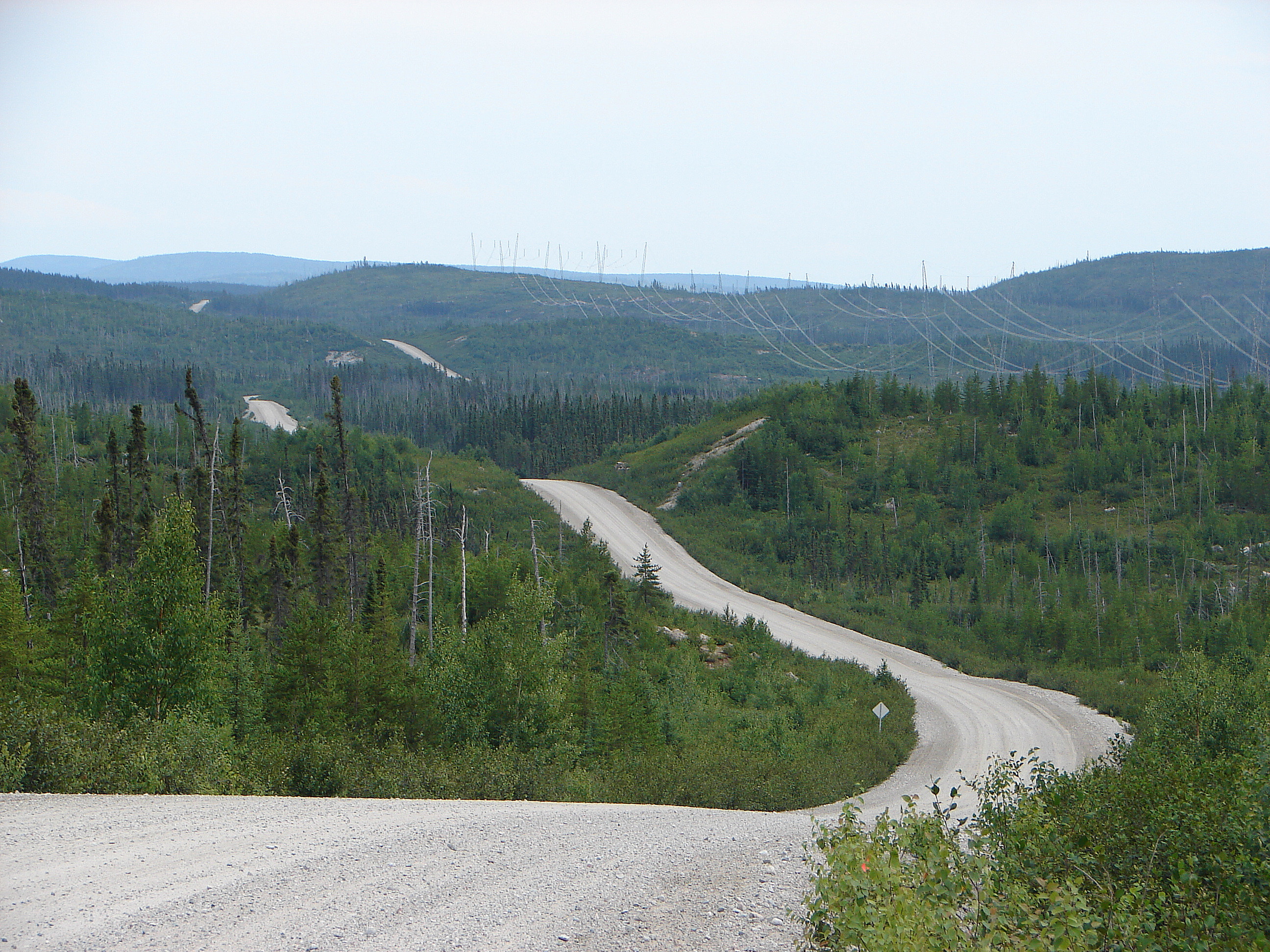
The North Road winding its way through Quebec's wilderness

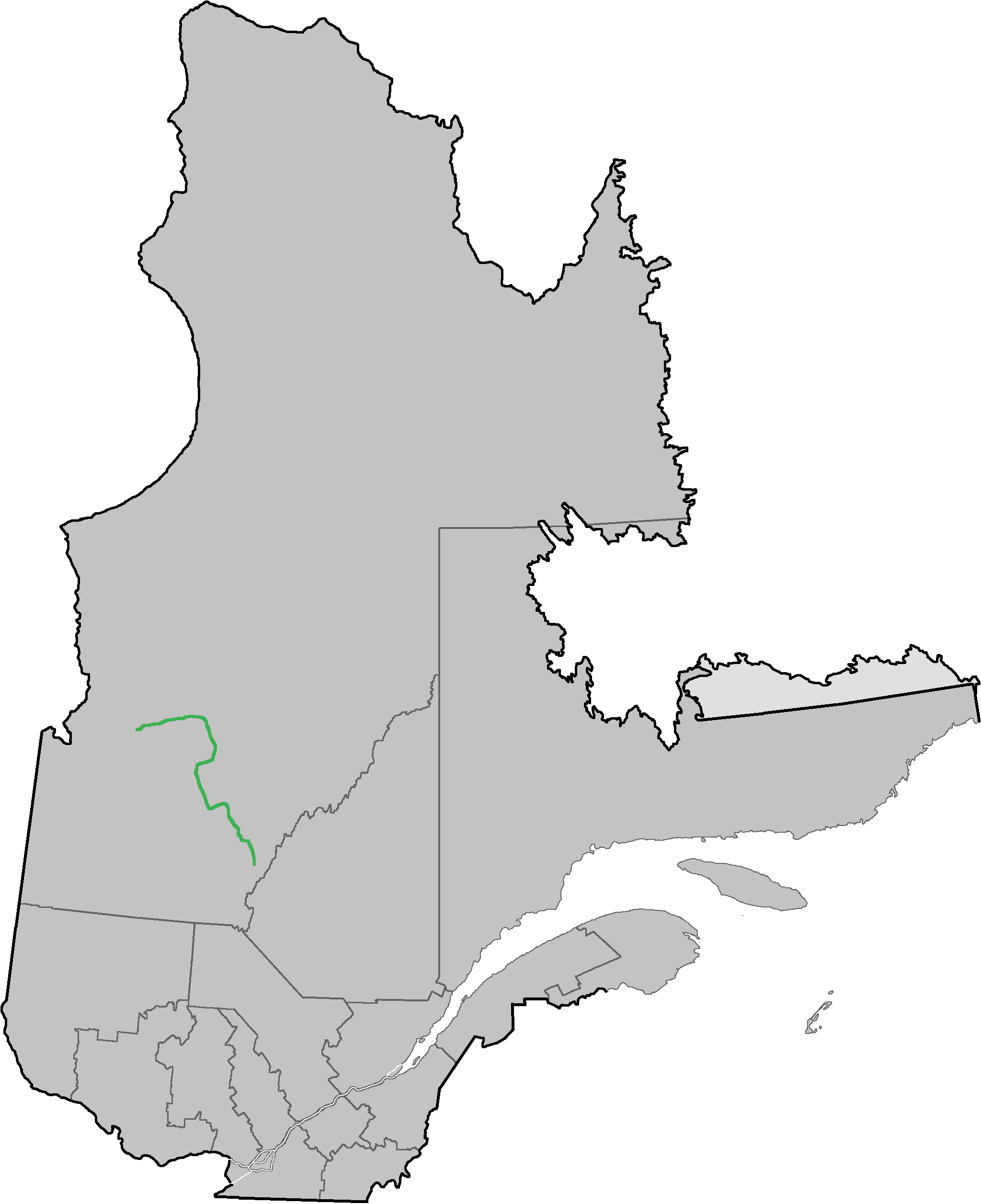
Map of North Road in Quebec

The Route du Nord (French for North Road) is an isolated wilderness road in central Quebec, Canada, connecting Chibougamau with the James Bay Road (French: Route de la Baie James) at km 275. It is 407 kilometres (253 mi) long, all of it unpaved. Extensive logging takes place along the southern half of this road.

There are no services available along the full length of the North Road, except at km 290 at the Cree Construction Company where fuel and repair services are periodically available. Also, fuel, food, and lodging can be obtained in the Cree village of Nemaska during the day time.

== Municipalities along Route du Nord ==
- Chibougamau
- Eeyou Istchee Baie-James

== Waypoints ==
Km	Mi	
0	0	junction with Route 167, about 15 km north of Chibougamau
238	148	bridge crossing the Rupert River
248	154	Hydro-Québec's Albanel substation
288	179	Hydro-Québec's Nemiscau substation
290	180	Cree Construction Company, services periodically available
291	181	junction with gravel access road to Eastmain-1 power station
296	184	junction with gravel road to Nemaska, 10 km north
407	253	junction with James Bay Road, end of North Road

== See also ==
- List of Quebec provincial highways
