= Pontax River =

Physical characteristics
- Source
  - location: Lake Champion
  - coordinates: 51°39′57″N 76°16′17″W
- Mouth
  - location: James Bay
  - coordinates: 51°35′55″N 78°48′54″W
- Length: 210 km (130 mi)
- Basin size: 8,133 km^{2} (3,140 sq mi)

The Pontax River is a river in Quebec, Canada. It flows into James Bay just north of Rupert River
