= Caniapiscau =

- Unorganized territory
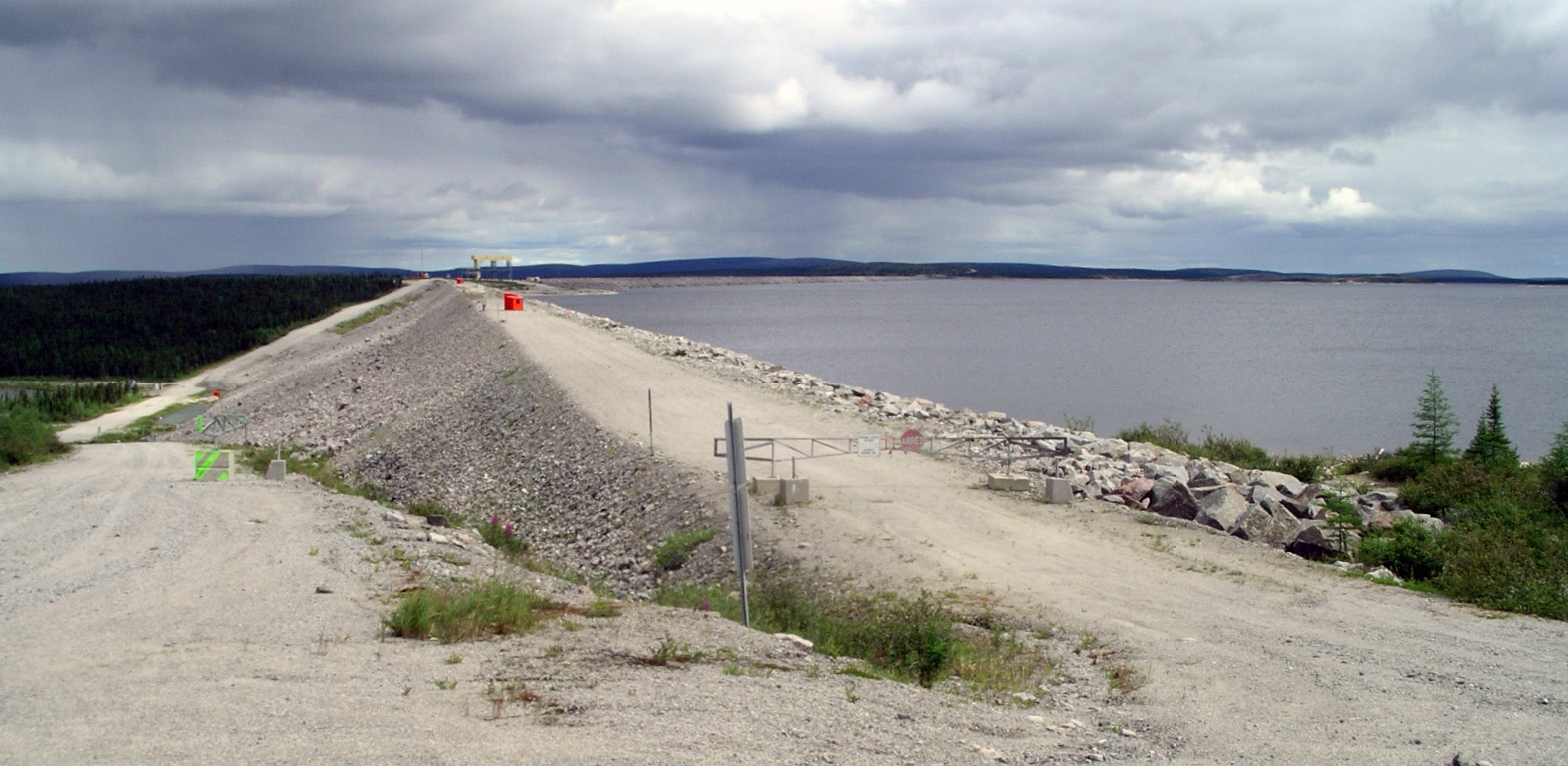
- Caniapiscau Reservoir

- Location in Côte-Nord Region of Quebec
- Coordinates: 54°52′N 69°55′W
- Country: Canada
- Province: Quebec
- Region: Côte-Nord
- RCM: Caniapiscau
- Constituted: unspecified

Government
  - Federal riding: Côte-Nord—Kawawachikamach—Nitassinan
  - Prov. riding: Duplessis

Area
  - Total: 40,577.46 km^{2} (15,667.04 sq mi)
  - Land: 30,108.23 km^{2} (11,624.85 sq mi)

Population (2021)
  - Total: 0
  - Density: 0/km^{2} (0/sq mi)
  - Pop (2016-21): N/A
  - Dwellings: 0
- Time zone: UTC-5 (EST)
  - Summer (DST): UTC−4 (EDT)
- Highways: No major routes

Caniapiscau (English: /ˌkæniəˈpɪskoʊ/; French pronunciation: [kanjapisko]) is a vast unorganized territory in the Côte-Nord region of Quebec, Canada, part of Caniapiscau Regional County Municipality.

The territory is home to the huge Caniapiscau Reservoir, the largest body of water in Quebec and the second-largest reservoir in Canada. The reservoir was named after Lake Caniapiscau that was flooded in 1981 during the formation of the reservoir. The name comes from the Cree or Innu term kaniapiskau or kaneapiskak which means "rocky point" or "place where there is a rocky point". Albert Peter Low had noted in 1895 that "a high rocky headland jutts into the lake." He probably referred to the northwest facing peninsula that gives the reservoir the shape of an arc as we know it now.

In the 19th century, Lake Caniapiscau was frequented by hunters and fur traders. In 1834, the Hudson's Bay Company opened there an outpost to link its facilities in the James Bay region with those of Ungava Bay. The Kaniapiskau Post closed in 1870.

== Community ==
Map of the Caniapiscau Reservoir.

Caniapiscau (54°52′4.1″N 69°50′10.5″W) is a small community without a permanent population, just north of the Caniapiscau Reservoir. It was formed as a temporary worksite in 1974 for workers involved in the construction of the dams and floodgates of this reservoir. The reservoir was built as part of the James Bay Project that gave rise to the La Grande hydroelectric complex. The worksite was closed after construction ended towards 1984.

Accessible only by air from 1974 to 1976, when a temporary landing strip was cleared on a nearby frozen lake, by an ice road from James Bay from 1977 to 1979 and, since late 1979, by the 666 kilometres (414 mi) long gravel Trans-Taiga Road (French: Route Transtaïga) which branches off the James Bay Road (French: Route de la Baie James). The 84 kilometres (52 mi) between Caniapiscau and Brisay is only recommended for four-wheel drive vehicles due to large rocks on the coarse-gravel surface.

The site is now used by an outfitter (fishing and caribou hunting) and the commercial Lac Pau (Caniapiscau) Water Aerodrome, operated by Air Tunilik, allows floatplanes to launch, subject to seasonal conditions.

== Demographics ==
Historical census populations – Caniapiscau, Quebec

Year	Pop.	±%
1991	0	—
1996	0	0.00%
2001	0	0.00%
2006	0	0.00%

Year	Pop.	±%
2011	0	0.00%
2016	0	0.00%
2021	0	0.00%

Source: Statistics Canada

== Transport ==
Caniapiscau is accessible by car via the Trans-Taiga Road. Located approximately 75 km south of Radisson, the Trans-Taiga highway is an unpaved gravel road. Along the road there are several campgrounds where users are able to spend the night. Donations are accepted, but not required. There are also several outfitters located along the way. Some are only open during certain times of the year, however Pourvoirie Mirage is open all year round at km 358. Food and gas may be purchased at this location. The now closed Caniapiscau Aerodrome was located in this region.
