= Rupert River =

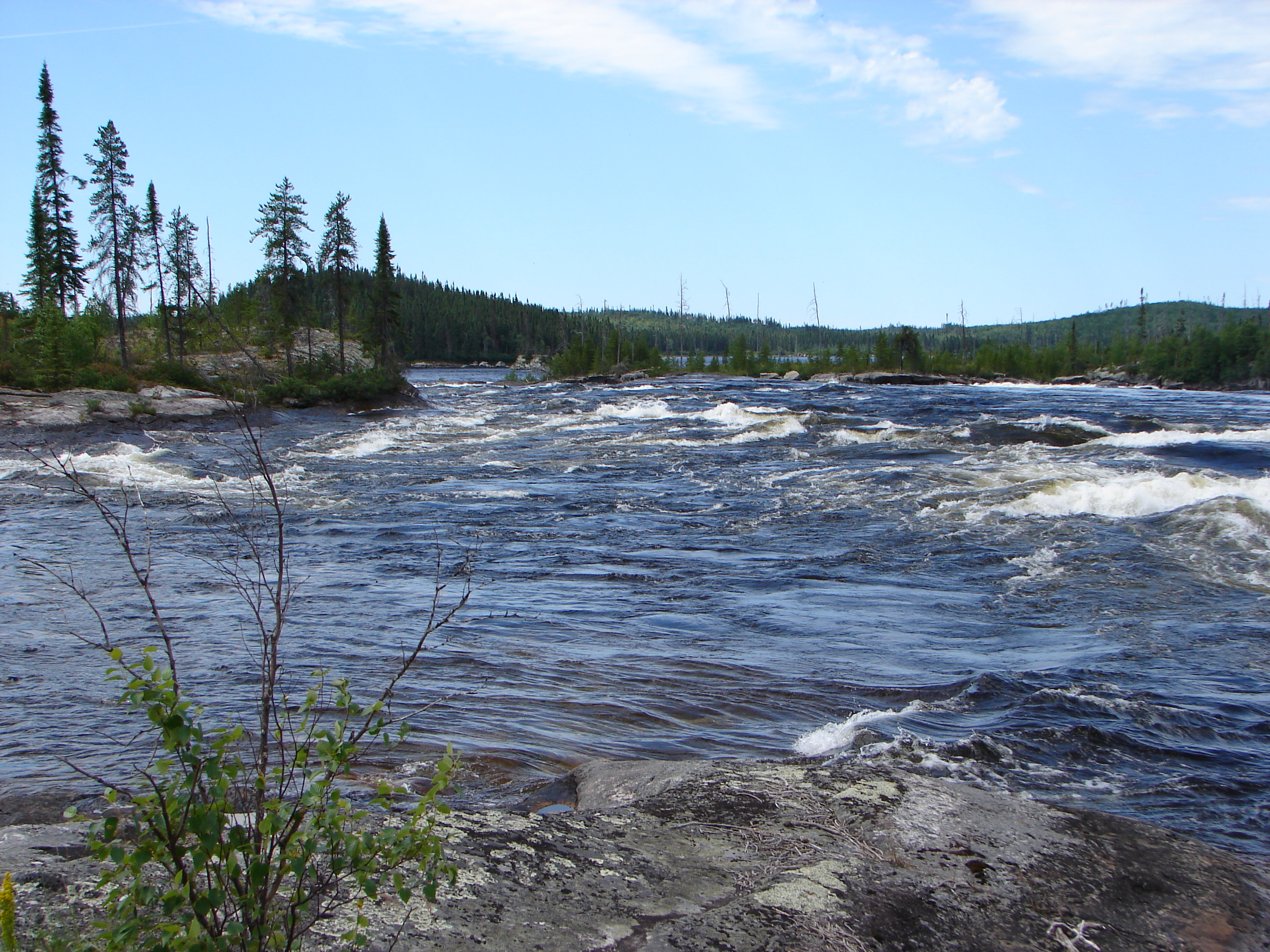

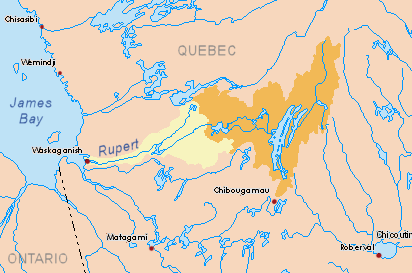
- Drainage basin of the Rupert River. Current basin in yellow. Diverted basin to the Eastmain and La Grande Rivers in orange. Original basin in yellow and orange.
- Native name: Rivière Rupert (French)

Location
- Country: Canada
- Province: Quebec
- Region: Nord-du-Québec

Physical characteristics
- Source: Lake Mistassini
  - coordinates: 50°57′0″N 73°42′0″W
- Mouth: Rupert Bay
  - location: Waskaganish
  - coordinates: 51°29′0″N 78°46′0″W
- Length: 763 km (474 mi)
- Basin size: 43,400 km^{2} (16,800 sq mi)
- Discharge
  - average: 900 m^{3}/s (32,000 cu ft/s)
- Discharge
  - location: Lake Mistassini outlet
  - average: 434 m^{3}/s (15,300 cu ft/s)

Basin features
- Tributaries
  - left: (upstream); Kaupuschun creek; Chikaskutakanich creek; Gaulier creek; Nastimistech creek; Kaipeyach creek; Tordu creek; Wapamiskushish creek; Kaumwakweyuch creek; outlet of lake Mézières; outlet of lake Du Détour; Kawaiskamichisi creek; La Marte River; outlet of a set of unidentified lakes; outlet of a set of unidentified lakes.
  - right: (upstream); Chikaskutckanish creek; Kaneusteko creek; Kaneusteko Takutachun creek; Papimichunich Kamachisteweyach creek; Papimichun Takutachun creek; Kapapimichun Takutachun creek; Puysh creek) (via the Bras Sipastikw); Itahunan creek (via the Bras Sipastikw); Kapisiyatiwakamiuch creek; Jolliet River; Nemiscau River (via Nemiscau Lake); Kawasachuck creek; Lemare River; outlet of lake Kawaskekamach; Kayechischekaw creek.

The Rupert River is a river in Quebec, Canada. From its headwaters in Lake Mistassini, the largest natural lake in Quebec, it flows 556 kilometres (345 mi) west into Rupert Bay on James Bay. The Rupert drains an area of 43,400 square kilometres (16,800 sq mi).

There is some extremely large whitewater on the river, but paddlers can avoid much of it by portage routes on the side. The most impressive falls, which cannot be avoided except by portaging, are the "Oatmeal Rapids" right at the James Bay Road (a set of cascades dropping 18 m (59 ft)) and "The Fours" near the end of the river (a 24 m (79 ft) drop).

The Rupert has long been an important river for the Cree of the area. Every year, a group of Cree youth from the village of Waskaganish, at the mouth of the Rupert, travel up the river to Lake Nemiscau.

Major tributaries of the Rupert are (in downstream order):

- Natastan River (Rivière Natastan)
- Lemare River (Rivière Lemare) - 1,290 km^{2} (500 sq mi) subbasin
- Marten River (Rivière à la Marte) - 4,505 km^{2} (1,739 sq mi) subbasin
- Nemiscau River (Rivière Nemiscau) - 3,015 km^{2} (1,164 sq mi) subbasin

== History ==
In 1668, an expedition led by Médard des Groseilliers came to the mouth of the Rupert River in order to bypass French-controlled areas along the St. Lawrence River and in doing so, trying to break the French hold on the fur trade. They named the river after the sponsor of the expedition, Prince Rupert. A fort (originally called Fort Charles) was established at the mouth of the river, which later became the trading post Rupert House, the oldest trading post of the Hudson's Bay Company. From then on, the Rupert River played a vital role in supplying inland trading posts (such as Nemiscau and Mistissini) with regular canoe brigades, right until the beginning of the twentieth century when supplies started to come from the south via rail and later road.

While having lost its importance as a trade route, the Rupert River has long been a popular destination for recreational canoe camping and whitewater canoeing.

== Hydroelectric development ==
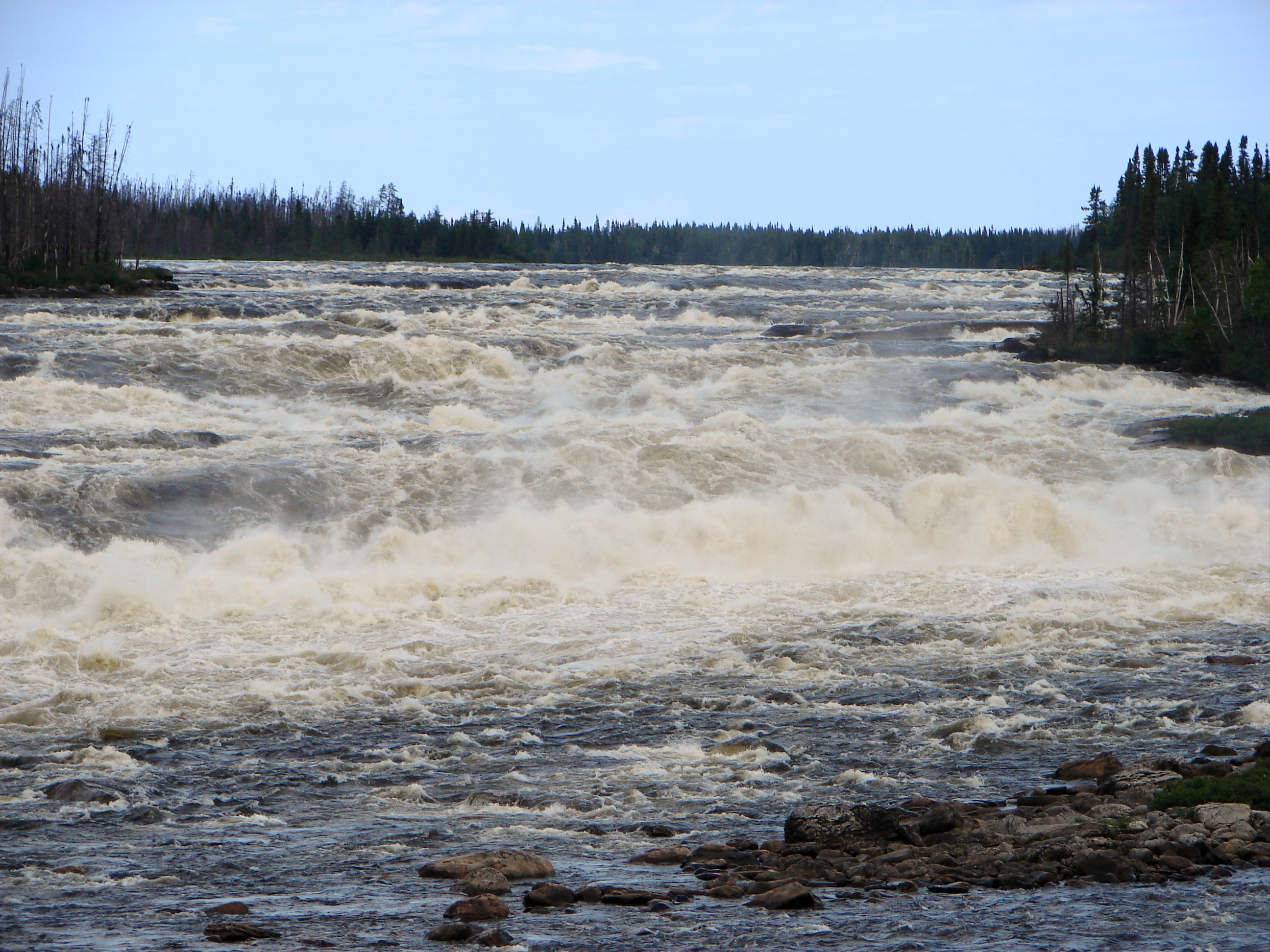
The Oatmeal Rapids on the Rupert River.

The Rupert, together with the Nottaway and Broadback rivers, was initially considered to be dammed and diverted as part of the James Bay Project. But in 1972, hydro-electric development began on the more northerly La Grande and Eastmain rivers, and the NBR Project was shelved.

The plan to divert the Rupert's headwaters into the La Grande hydroelectric complex was revived in 2002 when a landmark agreement between the Government of Quebec and the Grand Council of the Crees was signed. In this agreement, known as La Paix des braves (literally "Peace of the Braves"), the two parties agreed to authorize the completion of a long-delayed hydroelectric project on the Eastmain River, just to the north of the Rupert River. A subsequent agreement in April 2004 put an end to all litigation between the two parties and opening the way to the joint environmental assessment of the diversion of about 50% of the total water flow of the Rupert River (and 70% at the diversion point) northwards to the Eastmain River and into the La Grande hydroelectric watershed. The Grand Chief of the Crees, Matthew Mukash , elected in late 2005, opposed the Rupert diversion project, preferring the development of wind turbines in the region.

After completion of the joint environmental assessments by the Cree, Quebec and Canadian authorities, the governments of Quebec and Canada authorized the diversion and construction of hydroelectric installations on the Rupert River in late 2006. The diversion of water from the river began in November, 2009. 29,600 square kilometres (11,400 sq mi) or 68% of its basin will be diverted through a 2.9 kilometres (1.8 mi) long transfer tunnel from the Rupert Forebay to the Rupert Tailbay in the Nemiscau basin and then onward to the Eastmain 1 Reservoir. The remaining work was complete in 2012.

== Image gallery ==
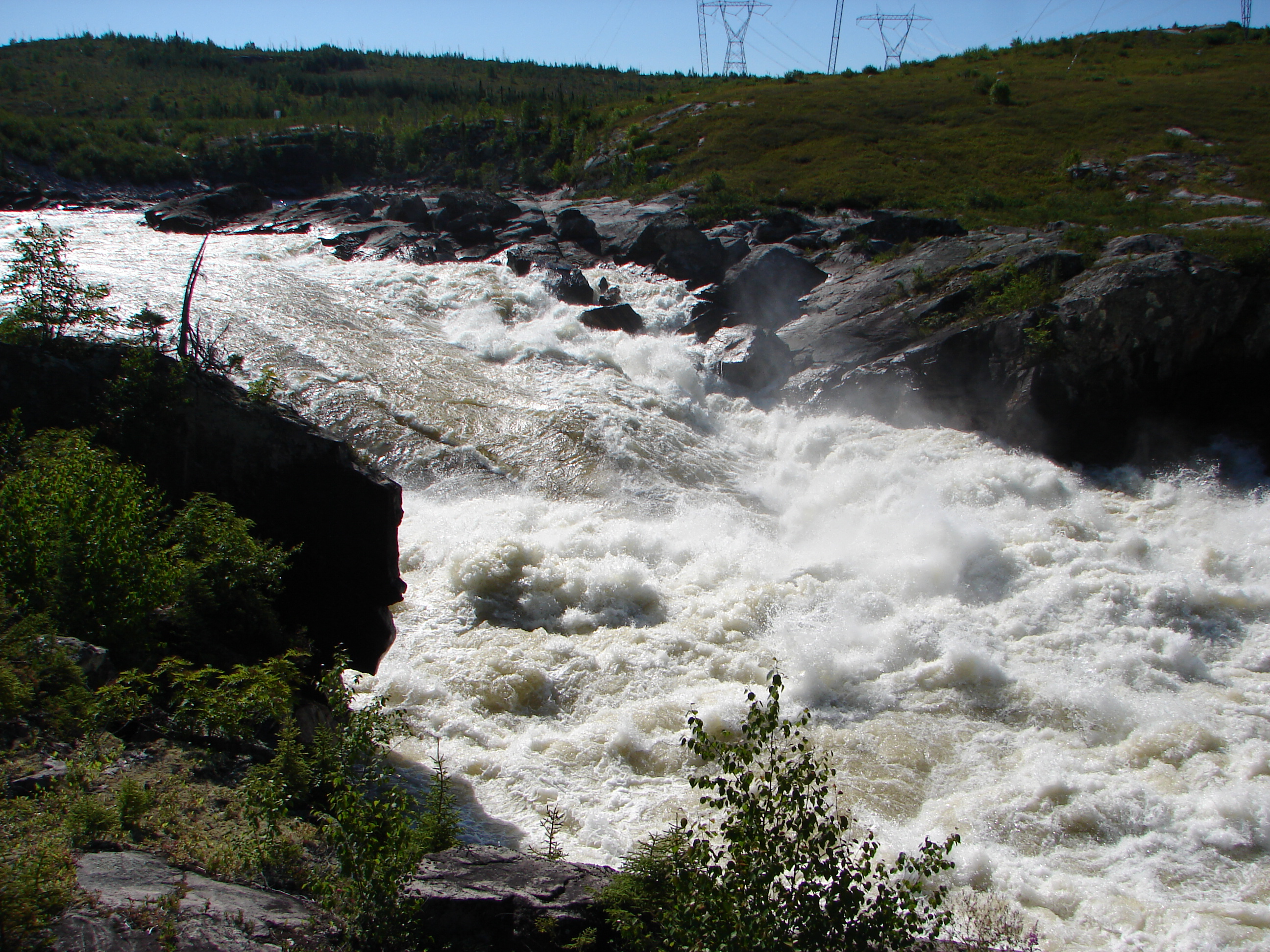
Rupert River at the Route du Nord

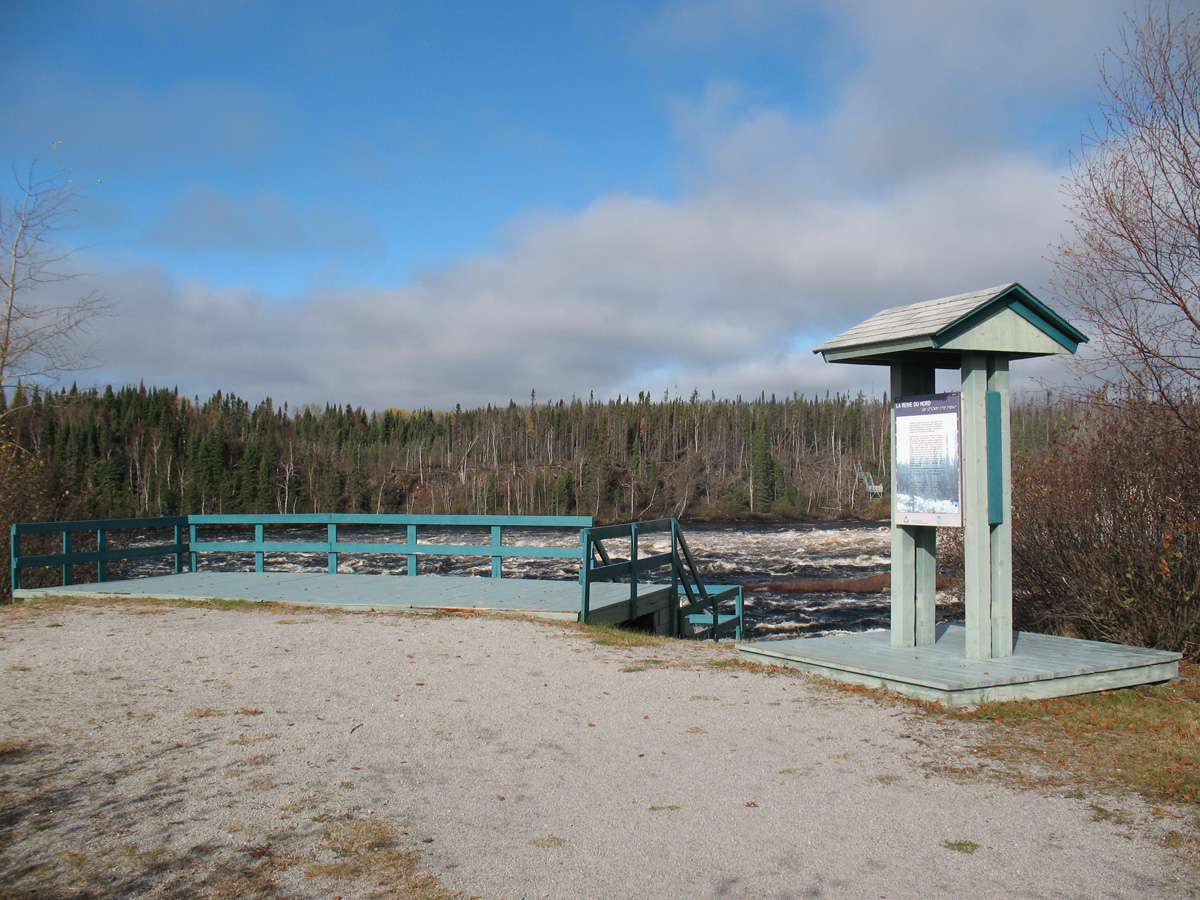
The Rupert River lookout

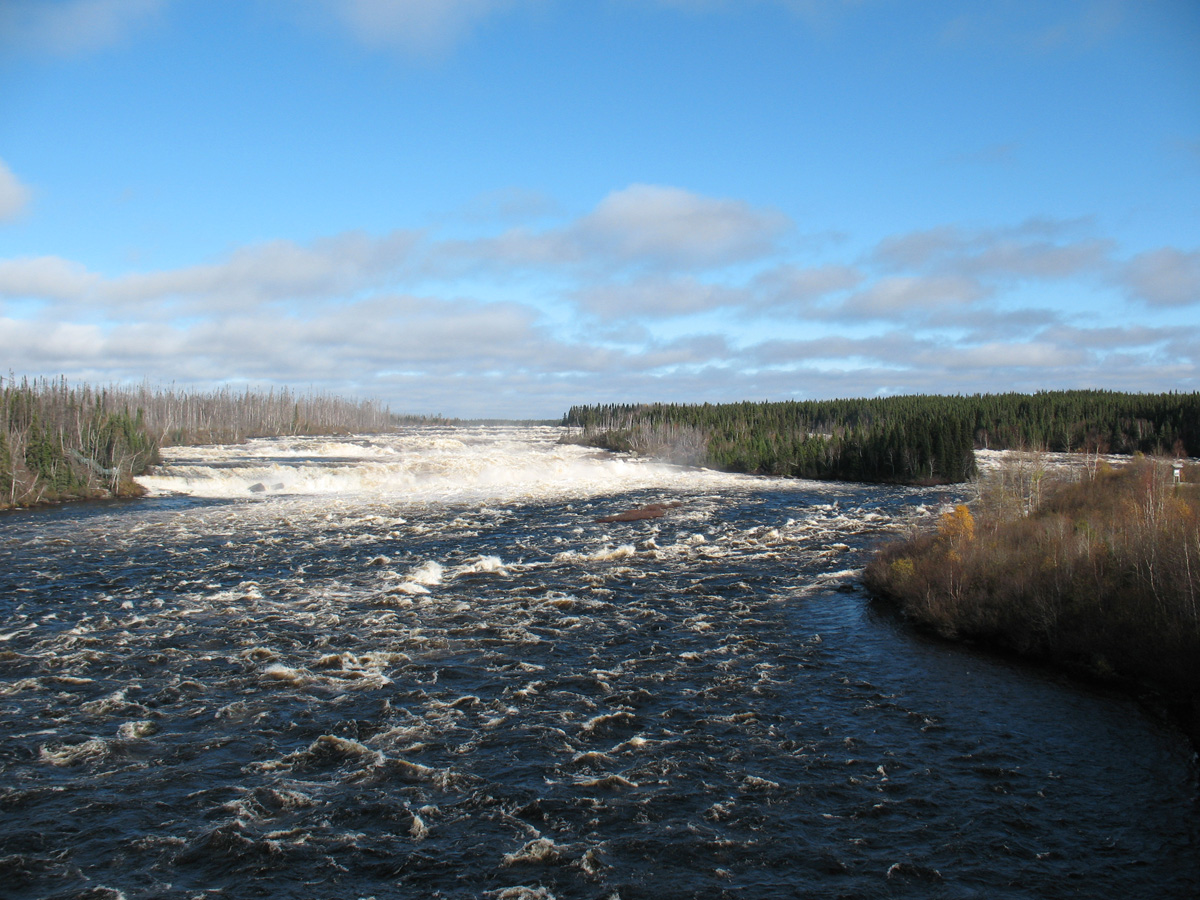
The Rupert River at the James Bay Road.

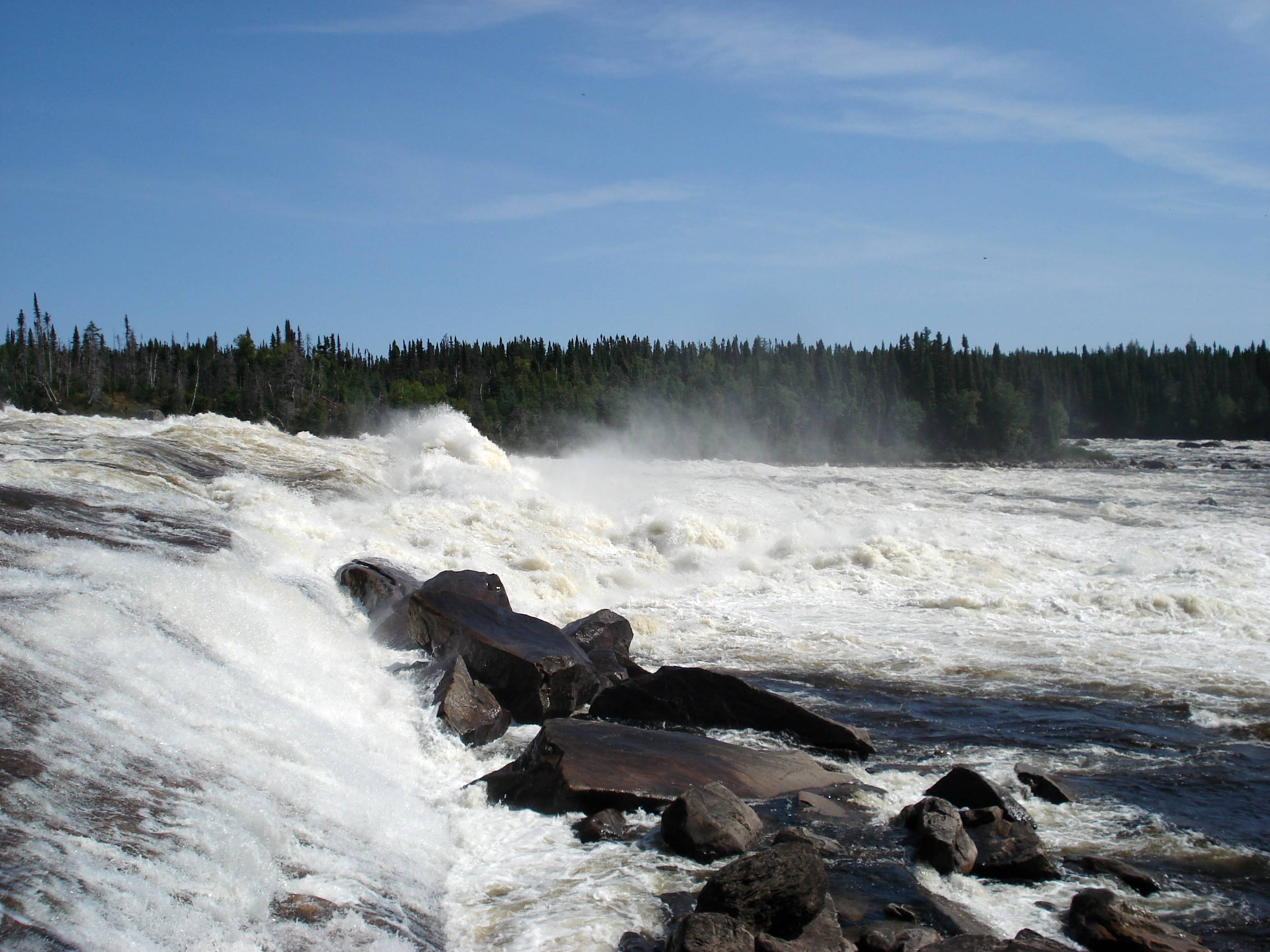
Close-up of the Oatmeal Rapids

== See also ==
- List of longest rivers of Canada
- Royal eponyms in Canada
- List of rivers of Quebec
