= Brisay generating station =

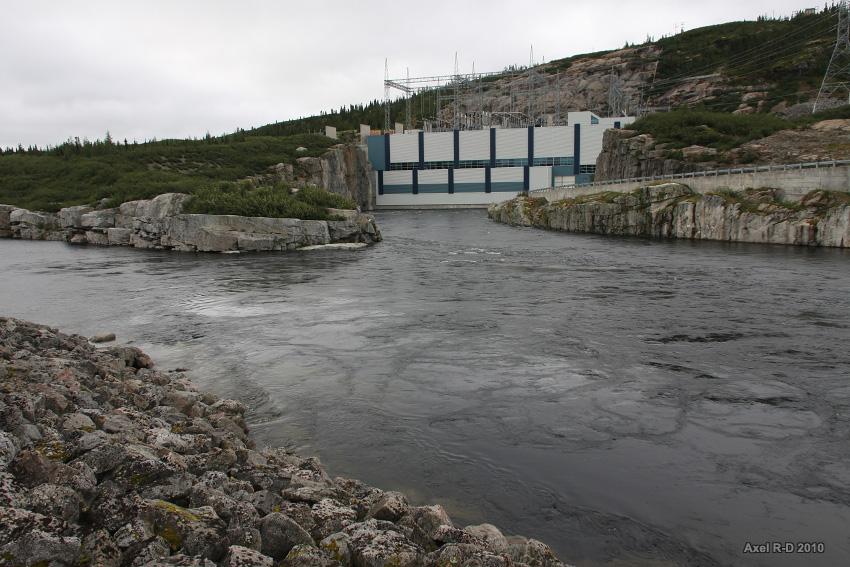
- Interactive map of Brisay generating station
- Official name: Centrale Brisay
- Location: Baie-James, Quebec, Canada
- Coordinates: 54°26′30″N 70°31′50″W
- Opening date: 1993
- Owner: Hydro-Québec

Reservoir
- Creates: Caniapiscau Reservoir
- Surface area: 4,275 km^{2} (1,651 mi^{2})

Power Station
- Hydraulic head: 37.5 m (123 ft)
- Turbines: 2 × 234.5 MW (Kaplan turbine)
- Installed capacity: 469 MW
- Hydro-Québec, The La Grande Complex visitor booklet, 2004, ISBN 2-550-41276-1

The Brisay hydroelectric generating station is on the Caniapiscau Reservoir, in the Canadian province of Quebec. Part of Hydro-Québec's James Bay Project, the station can generate 469 MW. It was commissioned in 1993. It generates electricity through the reservoir and dam system.
