= Nemaska =

Nemaska ᓀᒥᔅᑳᐤ (Nemiskâw)
- Terre réservée crie (Cree reserved land)

- Nemaska Nemaska (Canada)
- Coordinates: 51°41′06″N 76°15′22″W
- Country: Canada
- Province: Quebec
- Region: Nord-du-Québec
- Territory: Eeyou Istchee
- Constituted: 1978

Area
  - Total: 97.30 km^{2} (37.57 sq mi)
  - Land: 98.42 km^{2} (38.00 sq mi)

Population
  - Total: 832
- Website: Nemaska.com

Nemaska (Cree: ᓀᒥᔅᑳᐤ/Nemiskâw, meaning underwater point, but commonly associated with the word namesiskâw, meaning many fish.) is a small Cree community located on the shores of Lake Champion, in Quebec, Canada. It is a small Cree village with a population of 832 people at the 2021 census. Nemaska is the seat of the Grand Council of the Crees and Cree Regional Authority.

It was officially known (by the Quebec government) as Nemiscau until May 8, 2010.

Nemaska is a new and modern village that consists of Cree families originally living at the Nemiscau trading post on Lake Nemiscau (51°19′N 76°55′W). The settlement was abandoned in the mid-1970s when Hydro-Québec proposed hydro-electric development on the Rupert River, which would have resulted in the flooding of the area. The nearby Hydro-Québec electrical substation and airport, both called Nemiscau, create confusion as to the town's name. As a result, many maps indicate the new site by the old name Nemiscau.

Nemaska is accessible by air (from Hydro-Québec's Nemiscau Airport) and by car over the gravel North Road (Route du Nord). About 14 km (8.7 mi) east from the village is the huge Hydro-Québec substation of Nemiscau.

== Education ==
The Cree School Board operates the Luke Mettaweskum School (Cree: ᓘᒃ ᒣᑕᐧᐁᔥᑲᒻ ᒋᔅᑯᑕᒫᒉᐅᑲᒥᒄ).
