= Caniapiscau Reservoir =

Reservoir in Quebec, Canada

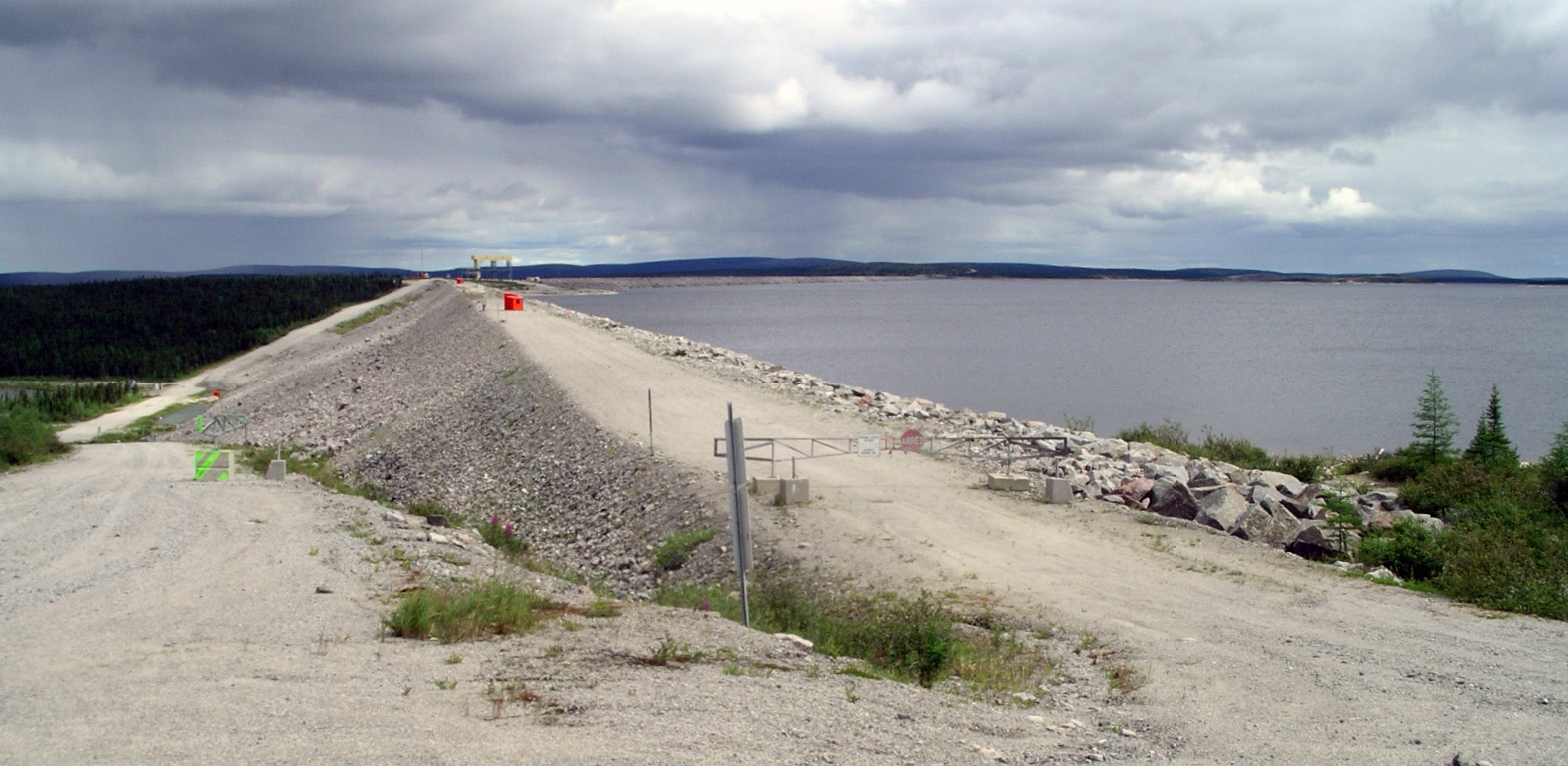

- Location in Quebec
- Location: Caniapiscau / Baie-James, Quebec, Canada
- Coordinates: 54°09′27″N 69°50′44″W
- Type: Artificial
- Primary inflows: Caniapiscau River
- Primary outflows: Laforge River, Caniapiscau River
- Catchment area: 36,800 km^{2} (14,200 sq mi)
- Basin countries: Canada
- Max. length: 120 km (75 mi)
- Max. width: 135 km (84 mi)
- Surface area: 4,318 km^{2} (1,667 sq mi)
- Max. depth: 49 m (161 ft)
- Water volume: 53.8 km^{3} (12.9 cu mi)
- Residence time: 2.2 years
- Shore length^{1}: 4,850 km (3,010 mi)
- Surface elevation: 535 m (1,755 ft)
- Islands: 300
- Settlements: Caniapiscau
- ^{1} Shore length is not a well-defined measure.

The Caniapiscau Reservoir (French: Réservoir de Caniapiscau) is a reservoir on the upper Caniapiscau River in the Côte-Nord administrative region of the Canadian province of Quebec. It is the largest body of water in Quebec and the second largest reservoir in Canada.

The Caniapiscau Reservoir, formed by two dams and forty-three dikes, is the largest reservoir by surface area of the James Bay Project. As headpond, it feeds the power plants of the La Grande complex in the winter and provides up to 35% of their production. Its total catchment area is about 36,800 square kilometres (14,200 sq mi).

The reservoir was named after Lake Caniapiscau that was flooded during the formation of the reservoir. The name is an adaptation of the Cree or Innu toponym kâ-neyâpiskâw, which means "rocky point". Albert Peter Low had noted in 1895 that "a high rocky headland juts into the lake." He probably referred to the northwest facing peninsula that gives the reservoir the shape of an arc as we currently know it.

The Caniapiscau Reservoir is accessible by bush plane and, since 1981, by a gravel road from James Bay (the Trans-Taiga Road). At the very end of this road, near the Duplanter spillway, is the former worksite of the Société d'énergie de la Baie-James, named Caniapiscau. There is no permanent human habitation at the reservoir, but it is used by outfitters for seasonal hunting and fishing expeditions and by some Cree for subsistence fishing and trapping. It is isolated from society, and there are very few gas stations or other services nearby.

== History ==
Map of the Caniapiscau Reservoir

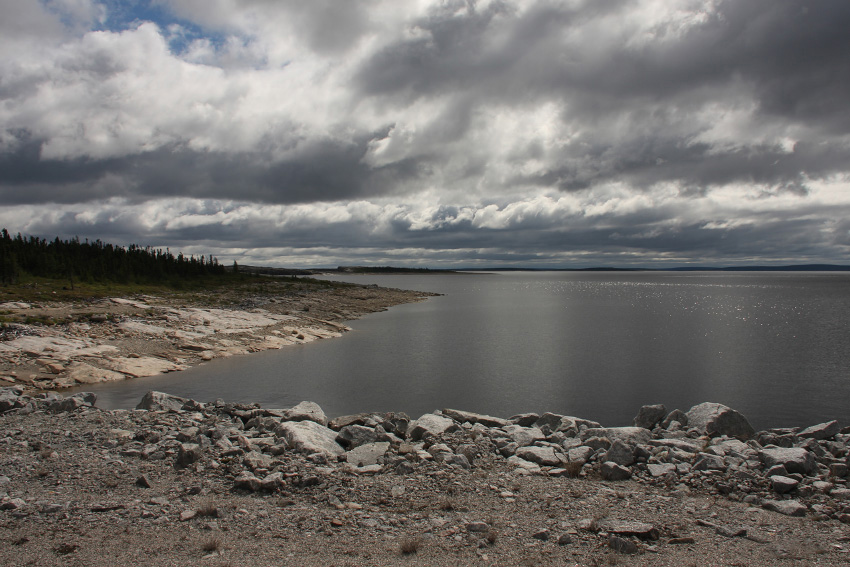
Caniapiscau Reservoir

The natural lakes of the region were formed about nine thousand years ago as glaciers left Quebec after having scoured the Canadian Shield for ninety thousand years. The prototype of these lakes was an ice dam lake that drained southwards into the Gulf of Saint Lawrence at a time when areas further north (Nunavik) were still glaciated. As post-glacial rebound elevated the southern part of the Canadian Shield more rapidly than the north, the region began to drain northward into the Caniapiscau River, a tributary of the Koksoak River, and ultimately into Ungava Bay.

Prior to impoundment, Lake Caniapiscau covered about 470 square kilometres (180 sq mi) and was frequented by hunters and fur traders in the 19th century. In 1834, the Hudson's Bay Company opened an outpost there to link its facilities in the James Bay region with those of Ungava Bay but closed the Kaniapiskau Post in 1870.

In 1976, Société d'énergie de la Baie James, a subsidiary of Hydro-Québec, began construction on the Caniapiscau Reservoir, designed to feed the hydro-electric generating stations of the James Bay Project. Filling the reservoir began on October 25, 1981, and over the next three years it flooded numerous lakes such as Lakes Caniapiscau, Delorme, Brisay, Tournon, and Vermouille. It now fills a depression in the highest part of the Laurentian Plateau of the Canadian Shield, covering 4,318 square kilometres (1,667 sq mi), or about four times the size of the natural lakes prior to impoundment.

Since August 1985, the Caniapiscau River has been partially diverted to the west into the Laforge River of the La Grande River watershed, flowing west to James Bay.

Many new islands were created as a result of the lake's impoundment, and in 1997 Quebec's Commission de toponymie published a map naming those islands for significant works of Québécois literature. The names of the islands attracted controversy not only because they predominantly used French-language works, but also because Cree and Inuit First Nations leaders claimed that the sites already had native names prior to becoming islands, which were ignored and overwritten.

== Flora ==
The Caniapiscau Reservoir is in the zone of discontinuous permafrost. The area surrounding the reservoir is vegetated entirely with taiga, or boreal forest, characterized by widely spaced Black Spruce with a thick underlayer of yellow-grey lichen and interspersed with muskeg and bogs. In the more moist areas, some closed coniferous forest stands may appear. On the more exposed land, a forest-tundra transition zone occurs where the woodland is replaced by lichen-dominated tundra.

== See also ==
- List of lakes of Quebec
- Hydro-Québec
- James Bay Project
- List of Quebec rivers

== Bibliography ==
- Société d'énergie de la Baie James (1987). Complexe hydroélectrique de la Grande-Rivière: Réalisation de la première phase (in French). Montreal: Société d'énergie de la Baie James/Éditions de la Chenelière. ISBN 2-89310-010-4.
