= Harrington Lake =

Summer residence of the Prime Minister of Canada

Harrington Lake _{La résidence du lac Mousseau (French)}
- Interactive map of the Harrington Lake _{La résidence du lac Mousseau (French)} area

General information
- Architectural style: Colonial Revival style
- Location: Gatineau, Quebec, Canada
- Coordinates: 45°33′14″N 75°55′46″W
- Current tenants: Prime Minister of Canada
- Construction started: 1925
- Client: Cameron Macpherson Edwards
- Owner: The King in Right of Canada
- Landlord: National Capital Commission

Technical details
- Size: 16 room home on 5.4-hectare (13-acre) property

Lac Mousseau
- Location within Quebec
- Location: Gatineau Park, Quebec
- Coordinates: 45°34′10″N 75°57′24″W
- Basin countries: Canada

Harrington Lake (French: La résidence du lac Mousseau) is the summer residence and all-season retreat of the prime minister of Canada, and also the name of the land which surrounds it. The farm that surrounded most of the lake was the property of Margaret and John Harrington. John could not farm the land and moved to the local town of Iron Sides (now Old Chelsea). The family stayed on the farm for many years and eventually moved to old Ottawa. The property is located near Meech Lake—where the Meech Lake Accord was negotiated in 1987—approximately 35 kilometres northwest of Ottawa, in Gatineau Park, amidst the Gatineau Hills in Quebec. The property is not open to the public, but the Mackenzie King Estate, the retreat of Prime Minister William Lyon Mackenzie King at Kingsmere, is a tourist attraction located 2 kilometres south in the park.

== Description ==
Since 1986, the 5.4-hectare (13-acre) property at Harrington Lake has been managed by the National Capital Commission. The property includes four recreational buildings; the land, which formerly consisted of cultivated fields, has reverted to secondary forest.

In addition to the main cottage with its view over the lake, the Harrington estate includes the following structures:

- staff cottage
- upper guest cottage
- lower guest cottage
- boat house and paddleboat dock
- long dock (located the northeast of the retreat)

The lake itself and the area around it are referred to as Lac Mousseau. The French name Mousseau comes from another early settler to the area, Louis Mousseau, who bought property in 1867.

The retreat is accessed by Chemin de Lac Meech with a gatehouse, staffed by the Royal Canadian Mounted Police Protective Policing Service, at the driveway of the retreat. The prime minister's motorcade accesses Harrington Lake from Ottawa via Quebec Autoroute 5.

== History ==
Several families came in the 19th century to settle the Harrington Lake area, including the Harrington and the Mousseau families. The lake eventually became known as "Harrington Lake" in English and "lac Mousseau" in French. The Mousseau family had built a farm on the shores of the lake, which remained in the family for several decades. Since the land was not suitable for farming, the lumber industry replaced it as the primary economic activity. In the early 20th century, two Americans, W. A. Drum and W. L. Donnelly, built a sawmill at Harrington Lake to serve the lumber industry.

In the 1920s, Lieutenant Colonel Cameron Macpherson Edwards, a member of a prominent lumbering family in Ottawa, inherited part of the property from his uncle, Senator William Cameron Edwards (who had owned 24 Sussex Drive). He recognized the value of the land for recreation, as well as for lumber. He purchased more land around the lake, expanding his total holdings to some 1,200 hectares (3,000 acres). He also ordered the demolition of the mill buildings at Harrington Lake, and replaced them with a 16-room cottage that was designed in the Colonial Revival style, very common in the 1920s according to the NCC, but with the addition of large fieldstone chimneys.

In 1951, the lake and the property (including neighbouring land belonging to William Duncan Herridge and Stanley Healey) were acquired by the King in Right of Canada to build up preserves of natural areas around the capital. In 1959, supporters of Prime Minister John Diefenbaker suggested that he needed a quiet place to go fishing, not too far from Ottawa. Later that year, Harrington Lake was chosen as the site for an official country residence and the buildings were formally designated as a secure residence for Canada’s prime ministers.

During the first prime ministership of Pierre Trudeau, his then-wife, Margaret, added a vegetable garden; according to Kim Campbell's autobiography Time and Chance, the garden still provided the house with fresh produce at the time of that writing. Campbell was the only prime minister to have spent her entire term in office residing at Harrington Lake. Initially, Campbell took up residence at Harrington Lake so that her predecessor, Brian Mulroney, could continue to reside at 24 Sussex Drive until renovations on his new private residence in Montreal were completed. Once Mulroney vacated 24 Sussex, Campbell had not finished moving to that address before her party was defeated in the 1993 election.

== See also ==
- Chequers, the retreat of the prime minister of the United Kingdom
- Camp David, the retreat of the president of the United States
- Harpsund, the retreat of Prime Minister of Sweden
