= Federal Woodlands Preservation League =

Canadian environmental organization

- Founded: 1934
- Type: Volunteer
- Headquarters: Ottawa, Ontario, Canada
- Key people: First President: Harry Baldwin; First patrons: R.B. Bennett, William Lyon Mackenzie King

The Federal Woodlands Preservation League (French: Ligue contre le déboisement des sites fédéraux) is a volunteer environmental advocacy organization. Its goal is to decrease logging around the Meech Lake and Kingsmere areas. Since its founding in 1934, the League has worked with the Canadian Federal Government on preservation issues, and is credited with creating Gatineau Park.

== History ==
On September 20, 1933, King met with his private secretary Harry Baldwin to discuss the issue. "We talked of starting a 'Society to preserve the Natural Beauty of the environs of Ottawa' – that was the suggested title I gave it, growing out of his wish to bring pressure on Quebec & Fed. govts. to save the roadsides their fringe of trees etc." wrote King in his diary.

At the League's first meeting on May 8, 1935, at Ottawa's Chateau Laurier, Prime Minister R.B. Bennett and opposition leader Mackenzie King were appointed as its patrons. Its first president was Harry Baldwin.

The list of its patrons and members includes many notable citizens of the day. While it operated between 1934 and 1947, members of the league included Governors General Bessborough, Tweedsmuir, and Athlone; Prime Ministers Sir Robert Borden, Arthur Meighen, R.B. Bennett, and Mackenzie King; Harry Baldwin, Percy Sparks, Duncan MacTavish, Ernest Lapointe, and Ambrose O’Brien. As well, its membership included Colonel J.T.C. Thompson, W.D. Herridge, Lieutenant-Colonel Cameron Macpherson Edwards, and Charles Bowman.

== The Lower Gatineau Woodlands Survey ==
On April 3, 1935, the chairman of the League's research committee, Percy Sparks, urged Interior Minister T.G. Murphy to commission a study of the Gatineau Hills' woodlands.

The resulting report, the Lower Gatineau Woodlands Survey, described the "effects of wood cutting operations and of fires on the aesthetic value of the forests" in the lower Gatineau valley and recommended remedial measures. The Survey drew up a history of forest fires and logging activities throughout the 19th and early 20th centuries, examined the excessive logging caused by the Depression, and dealt with other questions such as land ownership, timber growth rates, yield per acre, etc. It concluded that nearly 40 percent of the area surveyed had been "completely or partially cut" in the previous 20 years.

The Survey outlined eight options to control excessive cutting in the area, including public education, land purchase, and the creation of a national park. Of the alternatives discussed, the report recommended gradual land purchase. This would allow the government to acquire the most important areas and purchase additional land as funds and time allowed. The national park method was downplayed because the size of the area studied – about 16,000 acres (65 km^{2}) – was too small and it was felt the scheme would be too expensive and complicated in the short term.

Although the Survey was published in late 1935, the government did not start purchasing land until 1938. Two factors explain this delay: first, a new government was elected in late 1935, with Mackenzie King's Liberals defeating the Bennett Conservatives; second, King seemed very hesitant and cautious in this regard, since he had been wrongly accused in 1927 of wanting to build a national parkway to ease access to his summer residence at Kingsmere. Moreover, King's journal entry of December 20, 1937, indicates that he continued to fear criticism in this regard and needed prodding to take action. The entry relates a conversation King had with Finance Minister Charles Dunning concerning the creation of a national park in the Gatineau Hills:

He wanted to know what I wished to have done. I told him that the matter had stood over last year because of my feeling that people might think I was seeking to improve property around Kingsmere. I have come to the conclusion this year that I should not let possible misunderstanding of my ownership at Kingsmere stand in the way of a much-needed preservation of the forest. I told him I wished them to go ahead with the work, though personally it meant less in the way of seclusion for myself on the way to and from Kingsmere to have even the Meach Lake district open to tourists. I believe that we owe it to the Capital of Canada to save that part of its environment. I think he will agree to the $100,000 being appropriated for that purpose.

On October 9, 1937, Sparks was elected president of the Federal Woodlands Preservation League to replace Harry Baldwin. And, on December 13, 1937, Sparks sent a memorandum to King's office concerning the League's recent activities. The memorandum proposed an action plan for creating Gatineau Park, including the number of acres to be acquired and their cost, as well as public information and funding plans. It also informed Prime Minister King that Sparks would be giving a speech on this issue at the Chateau Laurier on January 18, 1938.

== Land purchases begin ==
As a result of League efforts, land purchases for Gatineau Park began in 1938. By 1941, 14,553 acres (58.89 km^{2}) had been acquired. However, the war put a stop to land acquisitions and to League activities. Following the war, in 1945, the League resumed its activities by pressing the government to continue expanding and developing the park. Though it had been created in 1938, the park remained without shape or direction. To solve the problem, Sparks wrote what is in essence the first Gatineau Park master plan: the Memorandum on the Enlargement and Development of the Gatineau Park, submitted to the Federal District Commission on October 9, 1945. The document recommended that the park's size be increased to at least 50,000 acres (200 km^{2}), provided a funding scheme for the purchase of land, and recommended the building of a parkway and recreational facilities.

== Advisory Committee on Gatineau Park ==
The League dissolved in 1947, when its more prominent members were appointed to the Federal District Commission's Advisory Committee on Gatineau Park.

Former League President Percy Sparks was unanimously elected chairman of the Advisory Committee at its first meeting in 1947. He continued to make significant contributions to park planning by writing the 1949 Report of the Advisory Committee on the Gatineau Park and the 1952 Report on the Master Plan for the Development of Gatineau Park. The latter document highlighted significant divisions among committee members over the issue of private property in the park.

== Sparks resigns from Gatineau Park committee ==
In 1954, Sparks resigned from the Advisory Committee over a disagreement with Federal District Commission Chairman General Howard Kennedy. In his last public statement on the park, a 1956 Memorandum to a joint parliamentary committee, Sparks charged that certain landowners were undermining park development for selfish reasons, underlining that General Howard Kennedy owned land in Gatineau Park. Sparks also mentioned that Lac Philippe residents had received expropriation notices, while their Meech Lake and Kingsmere counterparts had not, although the Meech and Kingsmere Lakes were far more important to park development.

== League and Sparks officially recognized ==
The National Capital Commission recognized Sparks' key contribution as president of the Federal Woodlands Preservation League and Chairman of the Advisory Committee on Gatineau Park, during an official ceremony dedicating the Roderick Percy Sparks Exhibition Hall in the park's visitor centre on July 8, 2005.

== See also ==
- Gatineau Park
- Percy Sparks
