= Thomas Willson =

Canadian inventor (1860–1915)

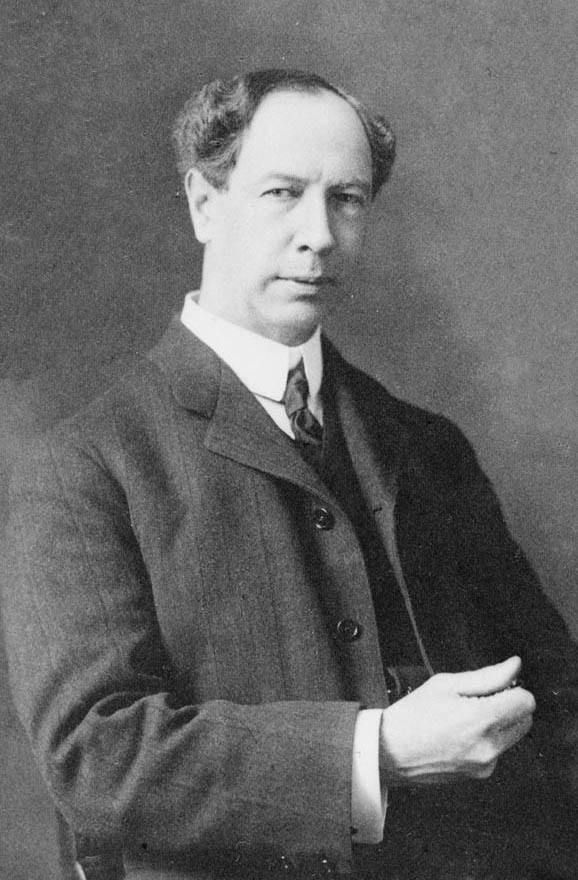
- Willson, c. 1914
- Born: March 14, 1860; Princeton, Ontario, Canada West
- Died: December 20, 1915 (aged 55); New York City, New York, United States
- Occupation: Inventor

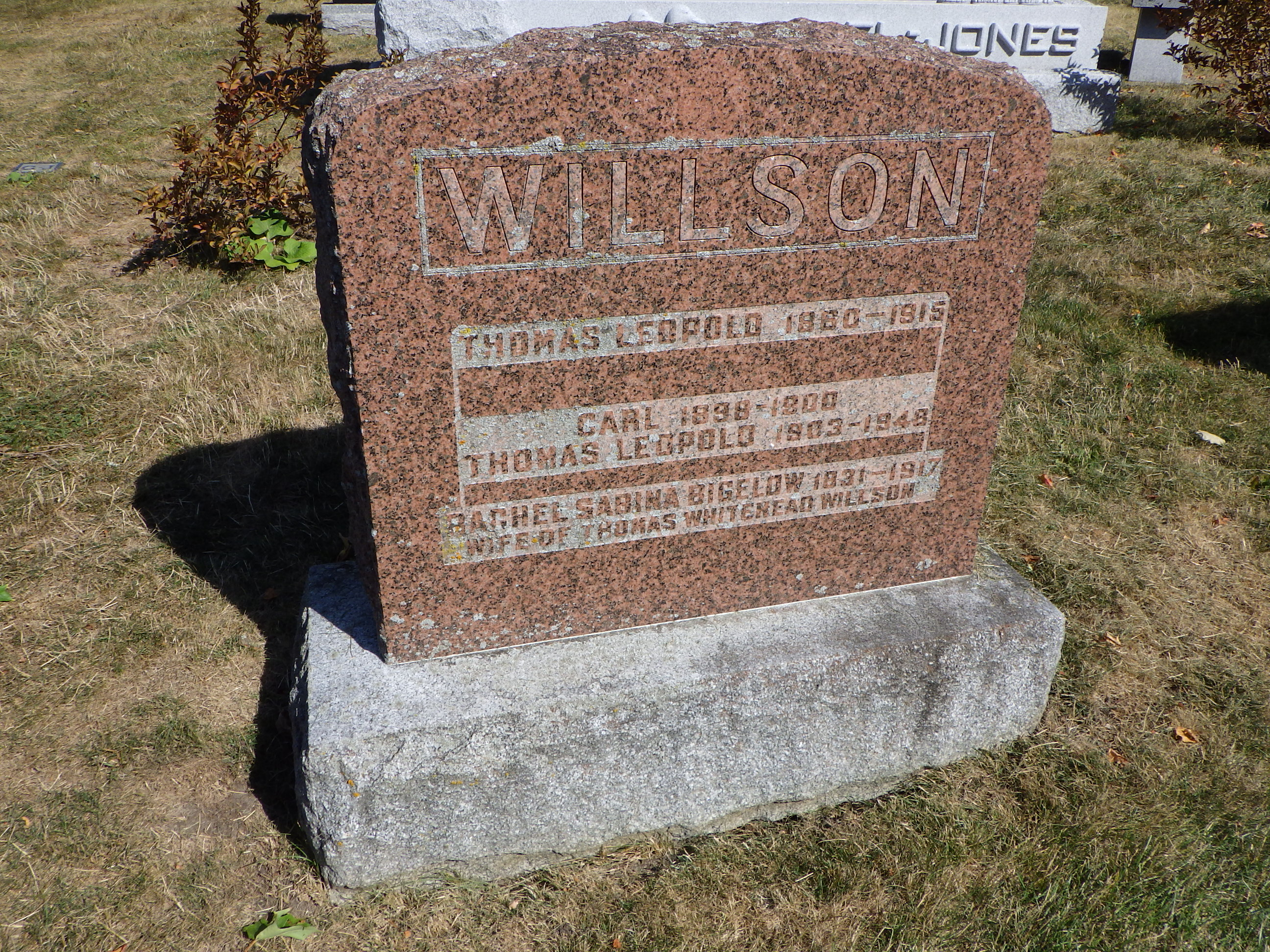
Willson's grave in Beechwood Cemetery in Ottawa

Thomas Leopold "Carbide" Willson (March 14, 1860 – December 20, 1915) was a Canadian inventor.

== Biography ==
Willson was born on a farm near Princeton, Canada West, on March 14, 1860, and went to school in Hamilton, Ontario. By the age of 21, he had designed and patented the first electric arc lamps used in Hamilton. He moved to the United States in search of opportunities to sell his ideas.

In 1892, Willson discovered an economically efficient process for creating calcium carbide, which is used in the production of acetylene gas. In 1895, he sold his patent to Union Carbide.

In the same year, Willson married Mary Parks in California and moved back to Canada. He built a house for his mother in Woodstock, Ontario in 1895. During 1900 and 1901, he moved to Ottawa and opened carbide plants both in Ontario (Merritton and Ottawa) and Quebec (Shawinigan). In 1911, he founded the International Marine Signal Company to manufacture marine buoys and lighthouse beacons.

Willson was the first person to own an automobile in Ottawa. In 1907, Willson built a summer house on Meech Lake in what is now Gatineau Park. The house is now owned by the federal government and notable for being the site of negotiations on the Meech Lake Accord. In 1911, he began experimenting with the condensation of phosphoric acid in the manufacture of fertilizers at a mill on Meech Creek within the park. Due to this venture and running out of capital, he missed one interest payment and lost nearly all of his estate to his creditor, American tobacco king James Buchanan Duke. The Meech Lake estate was then sold to Arthur Vining Davis who would go on to further Willson's enterprising effort by establishing the Quebec aluminum industry at Arvida, the name of the town being a portmanteau of his own name.

Willson died of a heart attack in New York City on December 20, 1915, while trying to raise funds for a hydroelectric project in Labrador. His dream was finally realized in 1974 as the Churchill Falls project. His name was given to an island on the Saguenay river, near the Shipshaw powerhouse.
