= Prime ministers of Canada in popular culture =

There have been numerous depictions of prime ministers of Canada in popular culture.

== Film and television ==
- John A. Macdonald:
  - In 1979 TV movie Riel, played by Christopher Plummer (Note: Plummer was a great-grandson of John Abbott)
  - In 2011, John A.: Birth of a Country, Macdonald is played by Shawn Doyle.
  - Played by Robert Christie in the 1966 CBC Television miniseries Reluctant Nation
- Pierre Trudeau:
  - In the 1980 film The Kidnapping of the President, played by Aubert Pallascio
  - In 2005 CBC mini series Trudeau II: Maverick in the Making, played by Stéphane Demers
- In the 2002 CBC mini series Trudeau, four prime ministers were portrayed
  - Pierre Trudeau, played by Colm Feore
  - Jean Chrétien, played by Guy Richer (during the film's time frame, Chrétien was a cabinet minister under Trudeau)
  - Lester Pearson, played by William Parsons
  - John Turner, played by Karl Pruner
- In the 2006 CBC mini series Prairie Giant: The Tommy Douglas Story, two prime ministers were portrayed:
  - John Diefenbaker, played by Paul Gross
  - Mackenzie King, played by Andy Jones
- John Diefenbaker, in the 1997 CBC miniseries The Arrow played by Robert Haley
- Sir Wilfrid Laurier:
  - In a 2011 episode of Murdoch Mysteries, played by Brian Paul (the actual prime minister, Stephen Harper, made a cameo portraying Toronto police officer Pete Armstrong in that episode)
  - Played by Jack Creley in the 1966 CBC Television miniseries Reluctant Nation
- Mackenzie King, played by Dan Beirne in the 2019 film The Twentieth Century
- Justin Trudeau, on a number of animated television sitcoms:
  - Showtime Network's Our Cartoon President, season 1 episode 5 "State Dinner," aired 4 March 2018
  - FOX TV's Family Guy, season 17 episode 11 "Trump Guy," aired 13 Jan 2019
  - FOX TV's The Simpsons, season 30 episode 21 "D'oh Canada," aired 28 April 2019

=== Fictional prime ministers ===
Fictional prime ministers of Canada have been portrayed in television series, including Rideau Hall, South Park, Jacob Two-Two, The Best Laid Plans and The West Wing, televisions films such as H_{2}O, and motion pictures such as Canadian Bacon, My Internship in Canada, Buried on Sunday, Long Shot and London Has Fallen.

== Literature ==
- Sir John Sparrow David Thompson plays a significant role in Knights of the Sea by Paul Marlowe
- Pierre Trudeau appeared in the Marvel Comics series Uncanny X-Men, issues #120-121. He ordered the Canadian superhero team Alpha Flight to apprehend Wolverine, who resigned from Alpha Flight to join the X-Men.
- Justin Trudeau has made appearances in a number of comics and graphic novels. He appears on the cover of the Chapterhouse Comics 2016 Summer Special with Captain Canuck. He also has a cameo in Marvel Comics' Civil War II: Choosing Sides (vol. 1 #5) as a "friend and sparring partner" of Tony Stark's, who attempts to mediate a schism between the Avengers and Alpha Flight known as the Second Superhuman Civil War. Trudeau's life, from his childhood as the son of a prime minister to his election to the same position in 2015 and the media attention that followed, was also chronicled in a graphic novel biography from Tidal Wave Productions' Political Power series released in September 2020.

=== Fictional prime ministers ===
- Jean-Jacques Charles: A Very Political Lady (1979) by Judy LaMarsh, said to be based on Pierre Elliott Trudeau.
- Gary Cody, in Marvel Comics' Alpha Flight (introduced as a low-level bureaucrat in 1978, killed by a supervillain in 2012)
- Scotty Gutenberg, replaced Cody after Cody's death
- Ross Hamilton: Party Favours (1997) by Jean Doe, said to be based on Brian Mulroney
- Bobby Laurier: Party Favours (1997) by Jean Doe, said to be based on Jean Chrétien
- Sir Henry Marwood: Pour la patrie (1895) by Jules-Paul Tardivel, said to be based on John A. Macdonald.
- Barton McGarvie: Scribes and Scoundrels (1997) by George Galt, said to be based on Brian Mulroney.
- April McTavish: Party Favours (1997) by Jean Doe, said to be based on Kim Campbell.
- Perry Pleaser: Jacob Two Two and the Dinosaur (1987) by Mordecai Richler
- The Prime Minister: S: Portrait of a Spy (1977) by Ian Adams, said to be based on Pierre Elliott Trudeau.
- Jean Rioux: Party Favours (1997) by Jean Doe, said to be based on Paul Martin.
- James Howden: "In High Places" (1961) By Arthur Hailey
- Gavin Strong: Prime Minister (2016), by Ainsley Booth and Sadie Haller; erotic novel similar to Fifty Shades of Grey in which the protagonist is said to be based on Justin Trudeau.

== As themselves ==
Paul Martin and Stephen Harper have appeared as themselves as the sitting prime ministers on the CTV sitcom Corner Gas:

- Paul Martin in the third-season episode "Fun Run"
- Stephen Harper in the fourth-season episode "Gopher It"

Justin Trudeau also appeared as himself in the later spin-off series Corner Gas Animated, in season 2 episode 5 "Paper Sashay" airing 15 July 2019.

Trudeau also made a cameo appearance on the 25 November 2022 episode of Canada's Drag Race: Canada vs. the World (season 1, episode 2), as a special guest in the "werk room" segment of the show. Commentators made note of the significance of Trudeau being the first national head of government to appear on the program at a time of heightened concern for the well-being of LGBT communities; the pre-taped episode aired a week after the attack on patrons at the Club Q nightclub in Colorado Springs, Colorado.

Several sitting prime ministers have also appeared as themselves on the CBC sketch comedy series Royal Canadian Air Farce, while Harper, Martin, and Chretien have all appeared in at least one installment of the satirical CBC series The Rick Mercer Report.

== Notable impersonators ==
- Royal Canadian Air Farce has portrayed several prime ministers
  - Pierre Trudeau, played by Don Ferguson
  - Joe Clark, played by Don Ferguson
  - Brian Mulroney, played by Don Ferguson
  - Kim Campbell, played by Luba Goy
  - Jean Chrétien, played by Roger Abbott
  - Paul Martin, played by Don Ferguson
  - Stephen Harper, played by Craig Lauzon
- Double Exposure has portrayed several prime ministers
  - Joe Clark, played by Bob Robertson
  - Jean Chrétien, played by Bob Robertson
  - Pierre Trudeau, played by Bob Robertson
  - Brian Mulroney, played by Bob Robertson
  - Kim Campbell, played by Linda Cullen
- Max Ferguson has portrayed several prime ministers on his radio shows
  - Pierre Trudeau: on CBC Radio's Max Ferguson Show
  - Lester Pearson: on CBC Radio's Rawhide and the Max Ferguson Show
  - John Diefenbaker: on CBC Radio's Rawhide and the Max Ferguson Show
- Martin Short played Pierre Trudeau on episodes of SCTV
- Mike Myers played Jean Chrétien on the November 13, 1993 episode of Saturday Night Live (season 19, episode 6) during the Weekend Update segment, in which he offers the "Canadian perspective" on NAFTA but rambles on aimlessly about unrelated subjects. At the end of the skit, "news anchor" Kevin Nealon humorously mispronounces Chrétien's name as "Gene Cretin."
- Jimmy Fallon played Justin Trudeau during the December 8, 2019 (season 45, episode 8) cold open of Saturday Night Live, "NATO Cafeteria," in which several world leaders portrayed as "cool kids" in a high school cafeteria banded together to tease and isolate U.S. president Donald Trump.
- Brian Mulroney was portrayed in the "Robin Sparkles" video on season two of How I Met Your Mother.

== Other appearances ==
- In the 1994-99 CTV/CBS primetime comedy-drama series Due South, RCMP officer Benton Fraser's companion dog was named "Diefenbaker." Paul Gross, the Canadian actor who played Benton Fraser, later went on to portray John Diefenbaker in the 2006 CBC miniseries Prairie Giant about social democratic leader Tommy Douglas.
- Justin Trudeau himself acted in a 2007 CBC docudrama The Great War portraying WW1 hero (and real life fifth cousin twice removed through Michel Dubuc (1644-1722)) Talbot Mercer Papineau.
