= Snow Job (TV series) =

Canadian television sitcom

- Country of origin: Canada
- No. of seasons: 3
- No. of episodes: 50

Production
- Running time: Approx. 22 minutes

Original release
- Network: CTV
- Release: February 21, 1983 – 1985

Snow Job is a Canadian television sitcom airing on the CTV network. The series, which ran from 1983 to 1985, was set in a ski lodge in the Laurentian Mountains in Quebec. The series was produced by Champlain Productions, the production division of CFCF-TV.

The show's cast included Jack Creley, Rummy Bishop, Richard Rebiere, Liliane Clune, Joanne Cote, and Gabe Cohen.

Guest stars included Jack Duffy, Bruce Gray, Peter Keleghan, Richard Simmons, Dale Hayes and Ruth Buzzi. Wayne Gretzky also appeared as himself, in an episode in which a young woman won a date with him in a contest.
