= Lac Phillipe =

Lake in Canada

Lac Philippe Philippe Lake
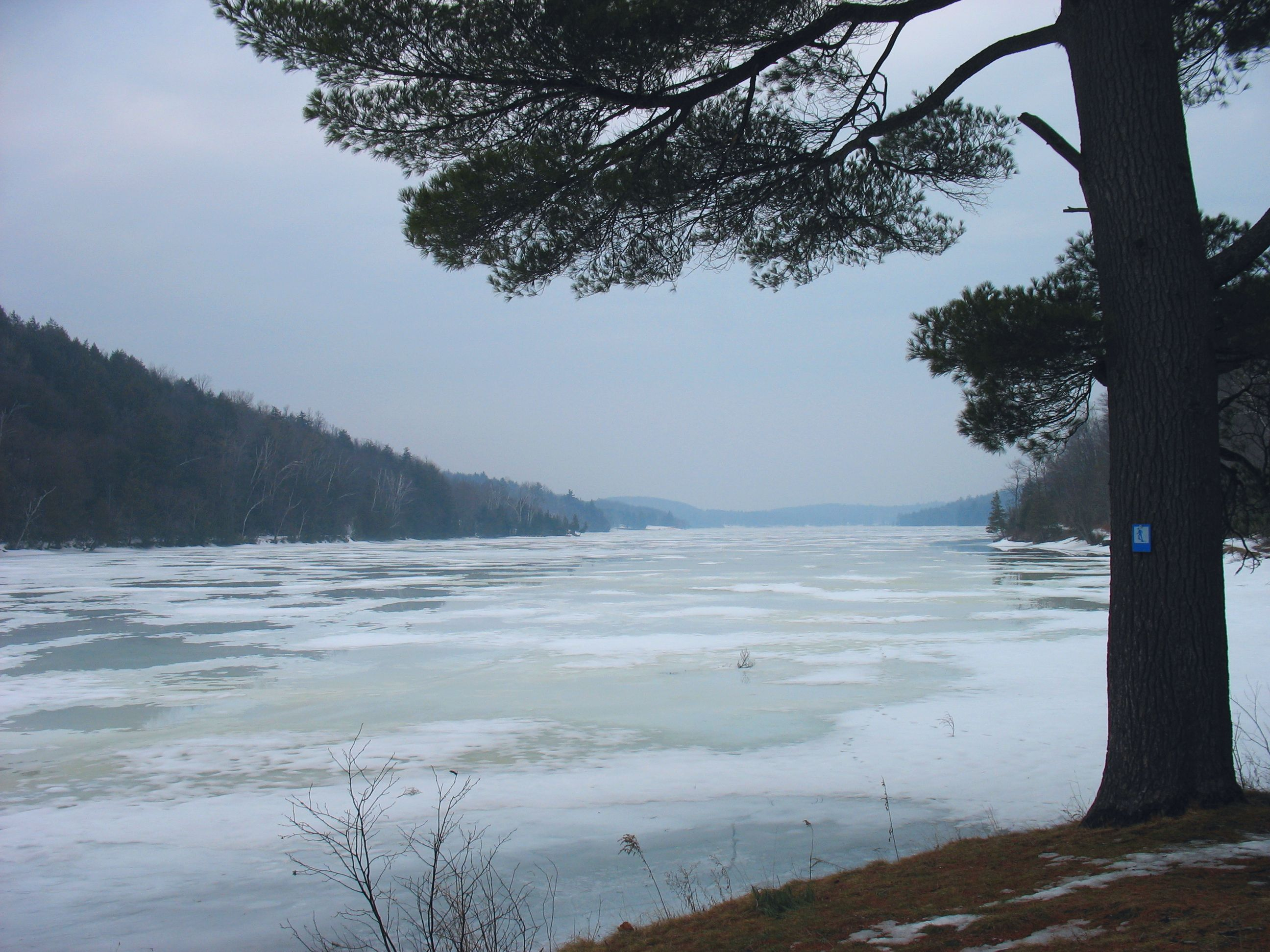

- Location within Quebec
- Location: Pontiac / La Pêche, Les Collines-de-l'Outaouais Regional County Municipality, Quebec
- Coordinates: 45°36′23″N 76°00′10″W
- Primary inflows: Smith Creek
- Basin countries: Canada
- Surface area: 1.76 km^{2} (0.68 sq mi)
- Average depth: 8.96 m (29.4 ft)
- Surface elevation: 171 metres (561 ft)

Lac Philippe is a medium-sized lake located on the north side of Gatineau Park. The lake is one of a chain of freshwater lakes found within the Gatineau park that drain into the Gatineau River through Meech Creek. It is one of the largest bodies of water in the northernmost stretches of the park, along with lac La Pêche (Fishing Lake) and lac des Loups (Lake of the Wolves), which are located in the extreme northwestern reaches. The lake is approximately a 45-minute drive from Ottawa

== Recreation ==
Swimming is permitted on the beach and is even guarded by lifeguards. Campsites are available on the coast of Lac Philippe. One may rent paddle-boats, kayaks, and canoes however. An admission fee is charged when driving into the park during the camping season. The lake is known for its family-friendly picnic areas and its clean water.

== Environmental Issues ==
Lac Philippe's ecological health has been under great stress from litter contamination, due to the level of human usage of the water body. 2017 saw the greatest ratio of water quality 'fail' grades (12%) to 'pass' grades (88%) compared to any year since at least 2011, which is a strong indicator of the lake's overall health in 2017. Upon walking around the shoreline, one may find such items sitting in the water's edge as inflated air mattresses and beer cans. Conservation measures should focus on litter reduction and limitation/elimination of external toxins (for example: hygiene products, food, bits of plastic, and toxic runoff from nearby campsites).

== Faunae ==
During the Autumn, Lac Philippe provides stunning presentations of colourful tree leaves blanketing the surrounding mountains. It offers feeding grounds for numerous bird species including the Common Loon (Gavia immer).
