= Prime Minister of Canada =

Head of government

- Premier ministre du Canada
- Incumbent; Mark Carney since March 14, 2025
- Government of Canada; Privy Council Office
- Style: The Right Honourable (Note: This title is granted to holders of the office for life upon taking office.) (formal); Prime Minister (informal)
- Abbreviation: PM
- Member of: Parliament; Privy Council; Cabinet
- Reports to: House of Commons
- Residence: 24 Sussex Drive (de jure); Rideau Cottage (de facto)
- Seat: Office of the Prime Minister and Privy Council building
- Appointer: Monarch (represented by the governor general); with the confidence of the House of Commons
- Term length: At His Majesty's pleasure
- Constituting instrument: None (constitutional convention)
- Inaugural holder: John A. Macdonald
- Formation: July 1, 1867
- Deputy: Deputy Prime Minister
- Salary: CA$435,400 (2026)
- Website: pm.gc.ca

The prime minister of Canada (Note: French: premier ministre du Canada. When the position is held by a woman, the French title is première ministre du Canada.) is the head of government of Canada. Under the Westminster system, the prime minister governs with the confidence of a majority of the elected House of Commons; as such, the prime minister typically sits as a member of Parliament (MP) and leads the largest party or a coalition of parties. As first minister, the prime minister selects ministers to form the Cabinet.

Not outlined in any constitutional document, the prime minister is appointed by the monarch's representative, the governor general, and the office exists per long-established convention. Constitutionally, executive authority is vested in the monarch (who is the head of state), but the powers of the monarch and governor general are nearly always exercised on the advice of the Cabinet, which is collectively responsible to the House of Commons. Canadian prime ministers are appointed to the Privy Council and styled as the Right Honourable (French: le très honorable), (Note: When the style is held by a woman, the French title is la très honorable.) a privilege maintained for life.

The prime minister is supported by the Prime Minister's Office and heads the Privy Council Office. The prime minister also selects individuals for appointment as governor general, provincial lieutenant governors, territorial commissioners, as well as to the Senate of Canada, Supreme Court of Canada, other federal courts, and senior members of the military and public service.

Mark Carney is the current prime minister of Canada, taking office on March 14, 2025. Since Canadian Confederation in 1867, 24 prime ministers have formed 30 ministries.

== Origin of the office ==
The position of prime minister is not outlined in any Canadian constitutional document and is mentioned only in a few sections of the Constitution Act, 1982, and in the Letters Patent, 1947 issued by King George VI. The office and its functions are instead governed by constitutional conventions and modelled on the same office in the United Kingdom.

== Qualifications and selection ==
In 2008, a public-opinion survey showed that 51 per cent of Canadians believed they voted to directly elect the prime minister. In fact, the prime minister, along with the other ministers in Cabinet, is appointed by the governor general on behalf of the monarch. By the conventions of responsible government, the foundation of parliamentary democracy, the governor general will call to form a government the individual most likely to receive the support, or confidence, of a majority of the directly elected members of the House of Commons; as a practical matter, this is often the leader of the party, or a coalition of parties, whose members form a majority, or a very large plurality, of seats in the House of Commons. No document is needed to begin the appointment; both the invitation and acceptance are usually oral.

A prime minister who has given intention to resign may advise the governor general on whom to appoint as the next prime minister. However, if the prime minister is resigning because he or she has lost the confidence of the House of Commons, the viceroy is not obligated to follow that advice. If the leader of the opposition is unable or unwilling to form a government, (Note: When Prime Minister John A. Macdonald died in office in 1891, Governor General the Lord Stanley of Preston approached John Thompson to form a government. But Thompson declined and instead advised Stanley to call on Senator John Abbott. Ahead of Prime Minister Mackenzie Bowell's resignation in 1896, Donald Smith turned down the offer to be the next head of government, leading Governor General the Earl of Aberdeen to appoint Charles Tupper as prime minister. Robert Borden announced his intention to resign as prime minister in 1920. Thomas White was summoned by Governor General the Viscount Byng of Vimy and rejected the appointment as prime minister. Byng then installed Arthur Meighen as his chief advisor.) the governor general can consult whomever he or she wishes.

While there is no legal requirement for the prime minister to be an M.P., for practical and political reasons the prime minister is expected to win a seat very promptly. However, in rare circumstances, individuals who are not sitting members of the House of Commons have been appointed to the position of prime minister. Two former prime ministers—John Joseph Caldwell Abbott and Mackenzie Bowell—served in the 1890s while members of the Senate. Both, in their roles as government leader in the Senate, succeeded prime ministers who had died in office—John A. Macdonald in 1891 and John Sparrow David Thompson in 1894.

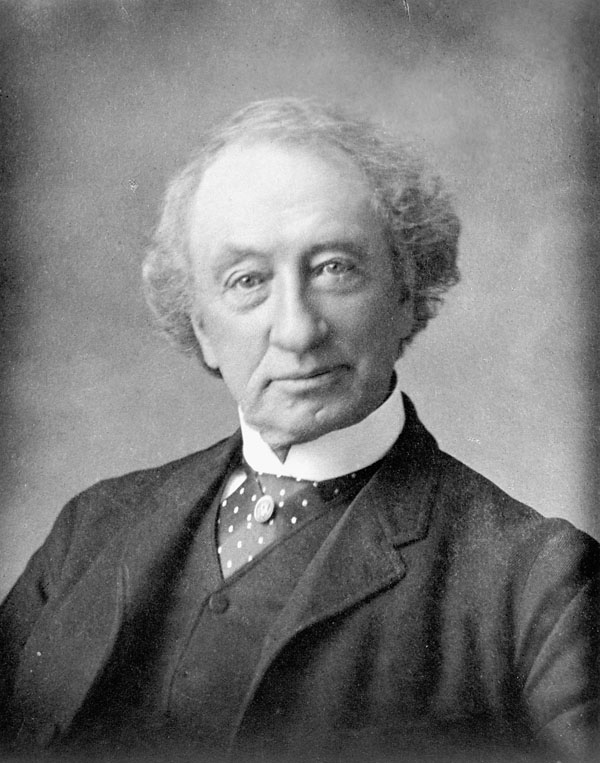
John A. Macdonald, the first prime minister of Canada (1867–1873, 1878–1891)

Prime ministers who are not M.P.s upon their appointment (or who lose their seats while in office) have since been expected to seek election to the House of Commons as soon as possible. For example, William Lyon Mackenzie King, after losing his seat in the 1925 federal election and again in the 1945 Canadian federal election (despite his party being elected government both times), briefly governed without a seat in the House of Commons on both occasions before winning a by-election a few weeks later. Similarly, John Turner replaced Pierre Trudeau as leader of the Liberal Party in 1984 and subsequently was appointed prime minister while not holding a seat in the House of Commons; Turner won a riding in the next election, but the Liberal Party was swept from power.

When a prime minister loses his or her seat in the legislature, or should a new prime minister be appointed without holding a seat, the typical process that follows is that a member in the governing political party will resign to allow the prime minister to run in the resulting by-election. A safe seat is usually chosen; while the Liberal and Conservative parties generally observed a practice of not running a candidate against another party's new leader in the by-election, the New Democratic Party and smaller political parties typically do not follow the same practice. However, if the governing party selects a new leader shortly before an election is due, and that new leader is not a member of the legislature, they will normally await the upcoming election before running for a seat in Parliament.

== Term of office ==
The prime minister serves at His Majesty's pleasure, meaning the post does not have a fixed term, and once appointed and sworn in by the governor general, the prime minister remains in office until he or she resign, is dismissed, or dies.

While the life-span of a parliament is constitutionally limited to five years, a 2007 amendment to the Canada Elections Act, Section 56.1(2) limited the term of a Parliament to four years, with election day being set as the third Monday in October of the fourth calendar year after the previous polling date. The governor general may still, on the advice of the prime minister, dissolve parliament and issue the writs of election prior to the date mandated by the constitution or Canada Elections Act; the King–Byng Affair was the only time since Confederation that the governor general refused the prime minister's request for a general vote.

Following parliamentary dissolution, should the prime minister's party subsequently win a majority of seats in the House of Commons, it is unnecessary to reappoint the prime minister or for the prime minister to retake the oath of office. If, however, an opposition party wins a majority of seats, the prime minister may resign or choose to meet Parliament to see if the incumbent government can win a confidence vote. Should the prime minister's party achieve a minority while an opposition party wins a plurality (i.e., more seats than any other party but less than a majority), the prime minister can attempt to maintain the confidence of the House by forming a coalition with other minority parties, which was last entertained in 1925 or by entering into a confidence-and-supply agreement, or by winning support of other parties on a vote-by-vote basis.

== Role and authority ==
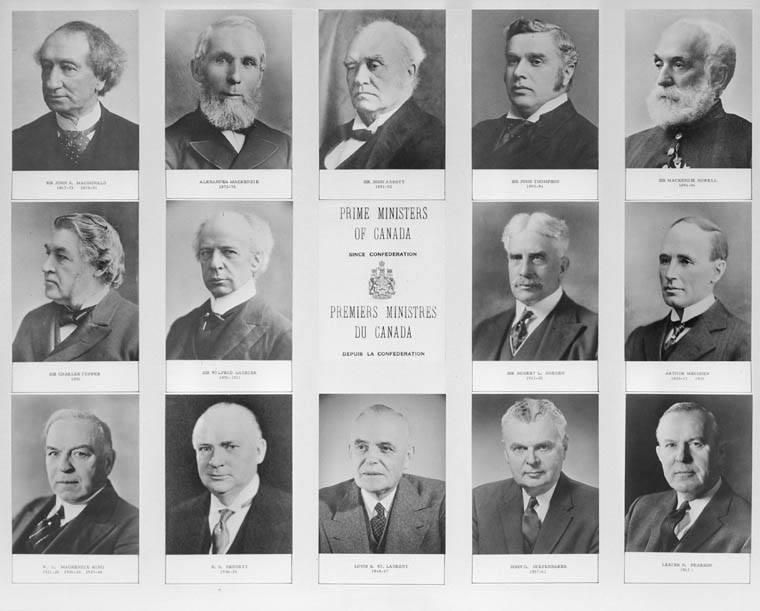
Canada's prime ministers during its first century

Because the prime minister is, in practice, the most politically powerful member of the Canadian government, he or she is sometimes erroneously thought to be Canada's head of state, (Note: A 2008 Ipsos-Reid poll found 42% of respondents thought the prime minister was head of state.) when in fact that role belongs to the Canadian monarch, represented by the governor general. The prime minister is instead the head of government and is responsible for advising the Crown on how to exercise much of the royal prerogative and its executive powers, which are governed by the written constitution and constitutional conventions. However, the function of the prime minister has evolved with increasing power. Today, per the doctrines of constitutional monarchy, the advice given by the prime minister is ordinarily binding, meaning the prime minister effectively carries out those duties ascribed to the sovereign or governor general, leaving the latter to act in predominantly ceremonial fashions. As such, the prime minister, supported by the Office of the Prime Minister (P.M.O.), controls the appointments of many key figures in Canada's system of governance, including the governor general, the Cabinet, justices of the Supreme Court, senators, heads of Crown corporations, ambassadors and high commissioners, the provincial lieutenant governors, and approximately 3,100 other positions. Further, the prime minister plays a prominent role in the legislative process—with the majority of bills put before Parliament originating in the Cabinet.

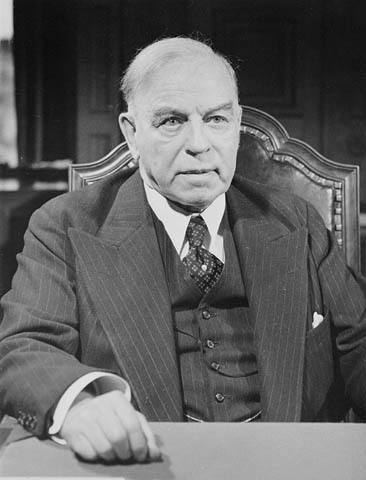
William Lyon Mackenzie King, the 10th prime minister of Canada (1921–1926; 1926–1930; 1935–1948)

Pierre Trudeau is often credited with, throughout his tenure as prime minister (1968–79, 1980–84), consolidating power in the P.M.O., which is itself filled by political and administrative staff selected at the prime minister's discretion and unaccountable to Parliament. At the end of the 20th century and into the 21st, analysts—such as Jeffrey Simpson, Donald Savoie, Andrew Coyne, and John Gomery—argued that both Parliament and the Cabinet had become eclipsed by prime ministerial power; (Note: See note 2 at Cabinet of Canada.) Savoie wrote: "The Canadian prime minister has little in the way of institutional check, at least inside government, to inhibit his ability to have his way." Indeed, the position has been described as undergoing a "presidentialization", to the point that its incumbents publicly outshine the actual head of state (and prime minister's spouses are sometimes referred to as First Lady of Canada). Former governor general Adrienne Clarkson alluded to what she saw as "an unspoken rivalry" that had developed between the prime minister and the Crown. It has been theorized that such is the case in Canada as its Parliament is less influential on the executive than in other countries with Westminster parliamentary systems; particularly, Canada has fewer M.P.s, a higher turnover rate of M.P.s after each election, and a U.S.-style system for selecting political party leaders, leaving them accountable to the party membership rather than caucus (as is the case in the U.K.).

There do exist checks on the prime minister's power: the House of Commons may revoke its confidence in an incumbent prime minister and Cabinet or caucus revolts can quickly bring down a serving premier and even mere threats of such action can persuade or compel a prime minister to resign, as happened with Jean Chrétien. The Reform Act, 2014, codifies the process by which a caucus may trigger a party leadership review and, if necessary, chose an interim leader, thereby making a prime minister more accountable to the M.P.s in one's party. Caucuses may choose to follow these rules, though the decision would be made by recorded vote, thereby subjecting the party's choice to public scrutiny.

The Senate may delay or impede legislation put forward by the Cabinet, such as when Brian Mulroney's bill creating the Goods and Services Tax (G.S.T.) came before the Senate, and given Canada's federal nature, the jurisdiction of the federal government is limited to areas prescribed by the constitution. Further, as executive power is constitutionally vested in the monarch, meaning the royal prerogative belongs to the Crown and not to any of its ministers, the sovereign's supremacy over the prime minister in the constitutional order is thus seen as a "rebuff to the pretensions of the elected: As it has been said, when the prime minister bows before the queen, he bows before us [the Canadian people]." Either the sovereign or the governor general may therefore oppose the prime minister's will in extreme crisis situations. (Note: See "Responsibilities" and note 1 at Cabinet of Canada.) Near the end of her time as governor general, Adrienne Clarkson stated: "My constitutional role has lain in what are called 'reserve powers': making sure that there is a prime minister and a government in place, and exercising the right 'to encourage, to advise, and to warn'[...] Without really revealing any secrets, I can tell you that I have done all three."

== Privileges ==
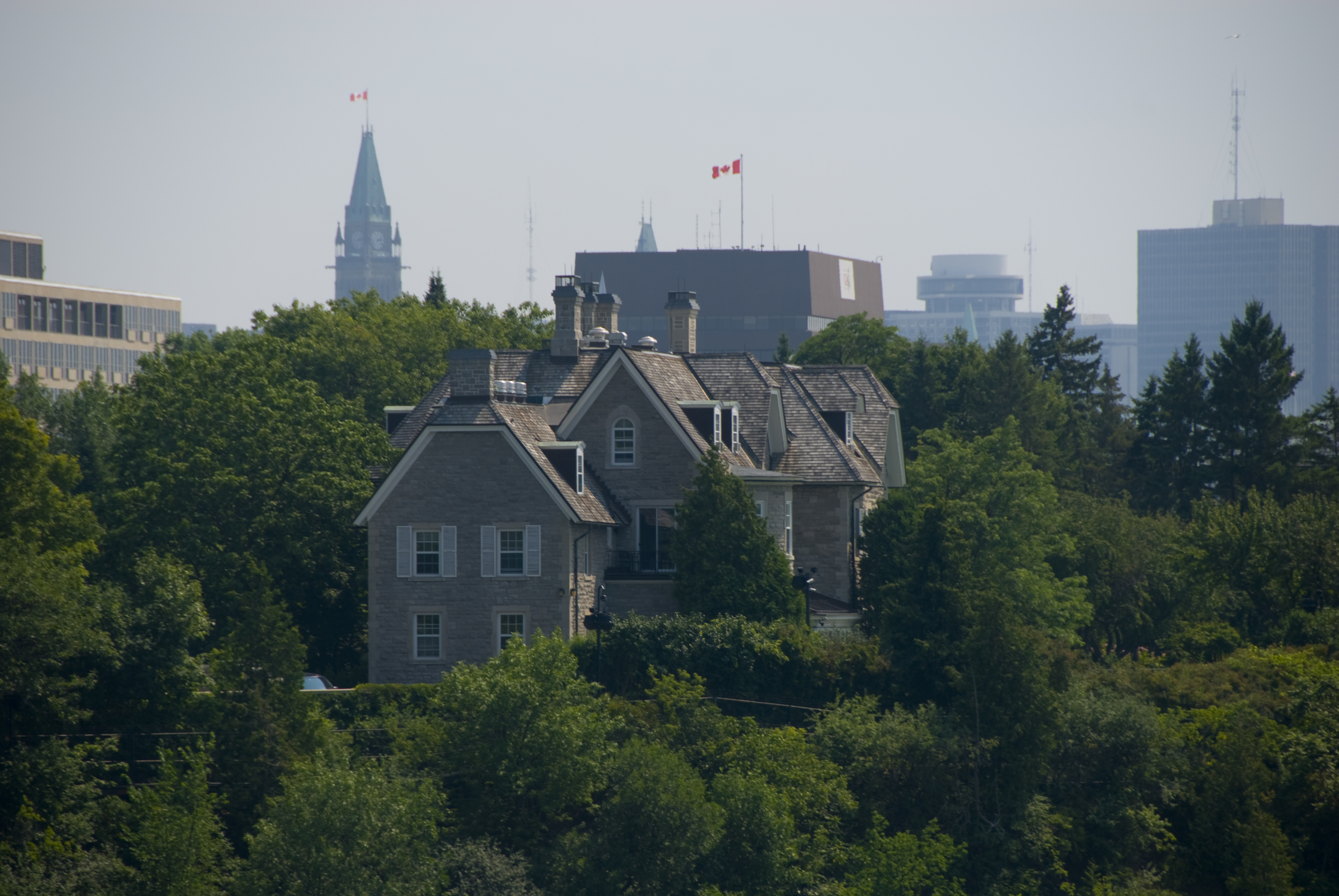
24 Sussex Drive, the official residence of the prime minister of Canada

Two official residences are provided to the prime minister—24 Sussex Drive in Ottawa and Harrington Lake, a country retreat in Gatineau Park—as well an office in the Office of the Prime Minister and Privy Council building (formerly known as Langevin Block), across from Parliament Hill.

For transportation, the prime minister is afforded an armoured car (a car allowance of $2,000 per year) and shared use of two official aircraft—an Airbus CC-330 Husky for international flights and a Bombardier CC-144 Challenger for domestic trips. The Royal Canadian Mounted Police also furnish constant personal security for the prime minister and his or her family. All of the aforementioned is provided through budgets approved by Parliament.

As of April 2024, the prime minister's annual salary is $406,200 (consisting of an M.P.'s salary of $203,100 and the prime minister's additional salary of $203,100).

A serving or former prime minister is accorded a state funeral, wherein his or her casket lies in state in the Centre Block of Parliament Hill. Bennett was the only former prime minister of Canada to die and be buried outside the country. John Thompson also died outside Canada, at Windsor Castle, where Queen Victoria permitted his lying-in-state before his body was returned to Canada for a state funeral in Halifax.

The mark of the prime ministership of Canada, applied to the arms of prime ministers

Prior to 1919, it was traditional for the monarch to bestow a knighthood on newly appointed Canadian prime ministers. Accordingly, several carried the prefix Sir before their names; of the first eight prime ministers of Canada, only Alexander Mackenzie refused the honour of a knighthood. Following the 1919 Nickle Resolution, however, the House of Commons declared that it should be against the policy of the Canadian Sovereign (and the Canadian government advising the Monarch when such honours are not within the Monarch's personal gift) to bestow aristocratic or chivalric titles to Canadians. The Crown in right of Canada (but not the Crown in right of the United Kingdom, which has periodically bestowed such Imperial honours on such citizens) has since adopted this policy generally, such that the last prime minister to be knighted near appointment was Robert Borden, who was the prime minister at the time the Nickle Resolution was debated in the House of Commons (and was knighted before the resolution). Still, Bennett was, in 1941, six years after he stepped down as prime minister, elevated to the peerage of the United Kingdom by King George VI as Viscount Bennett, of Mickleham in the County of Surrey and of Calgary and Hopewell in Canada. No prime minister has since been titled.

The Canadian Heraldic Authority (C.H.A.) grants former prime ministers an augmentation of honour on the coat of arms of those who apply for them. The heraldic badge, referred to by the C.H.A. as the mark of the Prime Ministership of Canada, consists of four red maple leaves joined at the stem on a white field (Argent four maple leaves conjoined in cross at the stem Gules); the augmentation is usually a canton or centred in the chief. Joe Clark, Pierre Trudeau, John Turner, Brian Mulroney, Kim Campbell, Jean Chrétien and Paul Martin were granted arms with the augmentation.

== Style of address ==
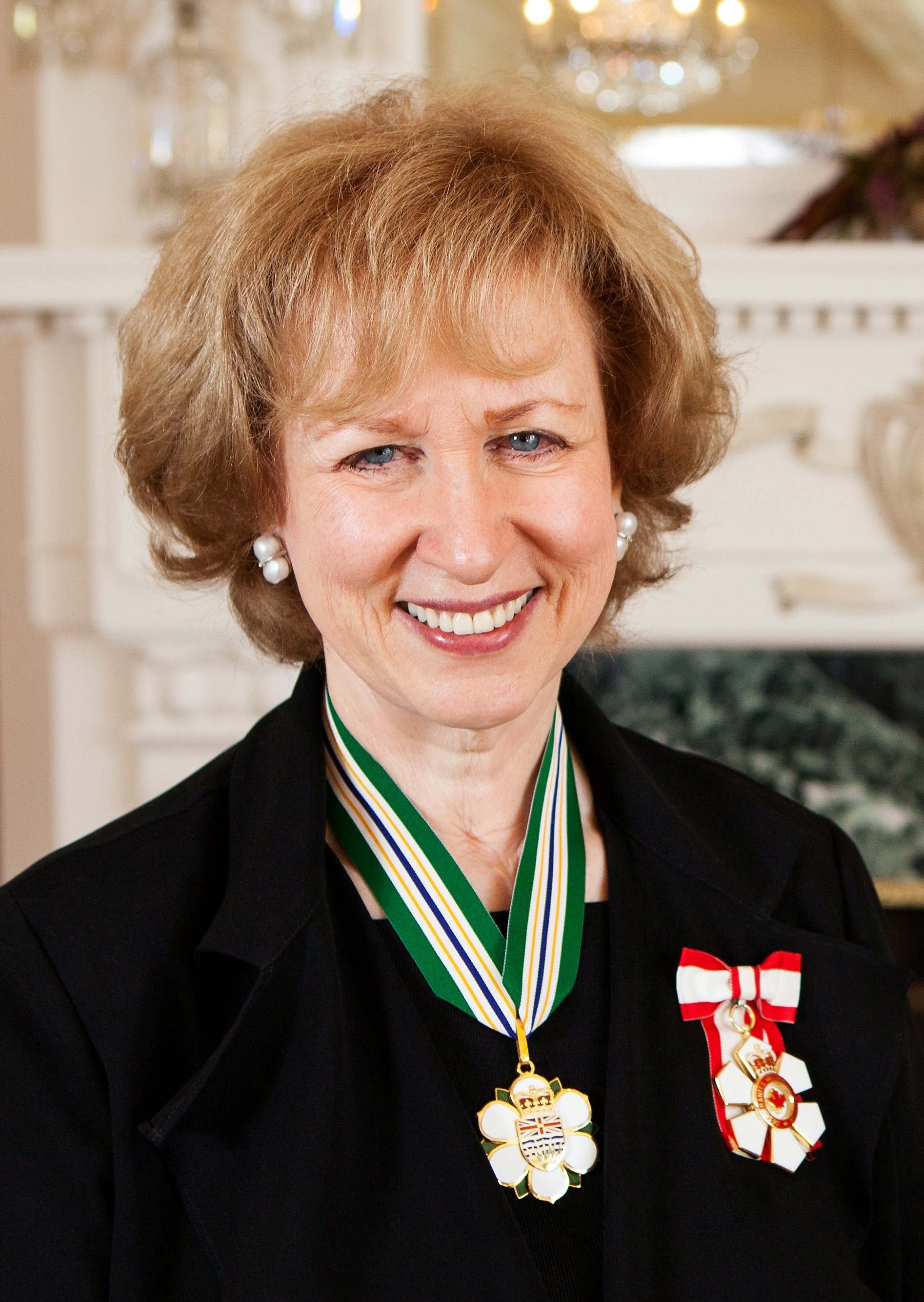
Kim Campbell, the 19th prime minister of Canada (1993) and only female and British Columbia–born person to hold the office

Canada continues the Westminster tradition of using the title Prime Minister when one is speaking to the federal head of government directly; the Department of Canadian Heritage advises that the term Mr. Prime Minister should not be used in official contexts. The written form of address for the prime minister should use his or her full parliamentary title: The Right Honourable [name], [post-nominal letters], Prime Minister of Canada. However, while in the House of Commons during Question Period, other members of parliament may address the prime minister as the Right Honourable Member for [prime minister's riding] or simply the Right Honourable Prime Minister. Former prime ministers retain the prefix the Right Honourable for life; should they remain sitting M.P.s, they may be referred as the Right Honourable Member for [member's riding], by their portfolio title (if appointed to one), as in the Right Honourable Minister of National Defence, or should they become opposition leaders, as the Right Honourable Leader of the Opposition.

In the decades following Confederation, it was common practice to refer to the prime minister as Premier of Canada, a custom that continued during the First World War, around the time of Robert Borden's premiership. While contemporary sources speak of early prime ministers of Canada as premier, the modern practice is to refer to the federal head of government almost exclusively as the prime minister, while the provincial and territorial heads of government are termed premiers (in French, premiers are addressed as premier ministre du [province]).

== Activities post-prime ministership ==
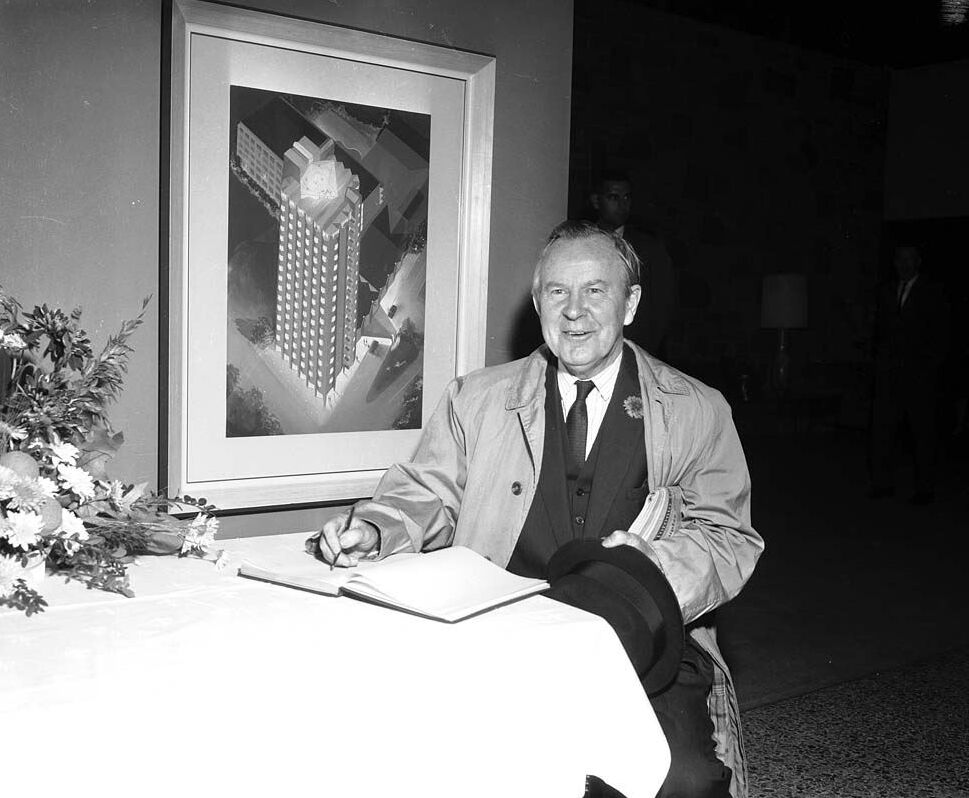
Lester Pearson, 1965

After exiting office, former prime ministers of Canada have engaged in various pursuits. Some remained in politics: Bowell continued as a senator, and Bennett moved to the United Kingdom and was elevated to the House of Lords. A number were leaders of the Official Opposition: John A. Macdonald, Arthur Meighen, Mackenzie King, and Pierre Trudeau, all before being reappointed as prime minister (Mackenzie King twice); Alexander Mackenzie and John Diefenbaker, both prior to sitting as regular Members of Parliament until their deaths; Wilfrid Laurier dying while still in the post; and Charles Tupper, Louis St. Laurent, and John Turner, each before they returned to private business. Meighen was also appointed to the Senate following his second period as prime minister, but resigned his seat to seek reelection and moved to private enterprise after failing to win a riding. Also returning to civilian life were: Robert Borden, who was Chancellor of Queen's and McGill Universities, as well as working in the financial sector; Lester B. Pearson, who was Chancellor of Carleton University; Joe Clark and Kim Campbell, who were university lecturers, Clark also consultant and Campbell working in international diplomacy and as the director of private companies and chairperson of interest groups; while Pierre Trudeau and Jean Chrétien returned to legal practice. Former prime ministers also commonly penned autobiographies—Tupper, for example—or published their memoirs—such as Diefenbaker and Paul Martin.

== See also ==
- Historical rankings of prime ministers of Canada
- List of prime ministers of Canada
- List of prime ministers of Canada by time in office
- List of prime ministers of Canada by religious affiliation
- List of books about prime ministers of Canada
- Prime ministers of Canada in popular culture
- Spouse of the prime minister of Canada

== Notes ==
Order of precedence
Preceded by Louise Arbour as Governor General of Canada	Prime Minister of Canada; Canadian order of precedence (ceremonial)	Succeeded by Richard Wagner as Chief Justice of Canada
