= Heraldic mark of the prime minister of Canada =

- Armiger: Prime Minister of Canada
- Use: Appears on the coats of arms of prime ministers who pursue an emblem from the Canadian Heraldic Authority.

The heraldic mark of the prime minister of Canada is granted to holders of the office who pursue an official personal coat of arms from the Canadian Heraldic Authority.

== History ==
Currently, eight former prime ministers have official coats of arms featuring the mark, including: Joe Clark, Pierre Trudeau, John Turner, Brian Mulroney, Kim Campbell, Jean Chrétien, and Paul Martin.

Following his father’s death in 2000, Justin Trudeau inherited Pierre Trudeau’s coat of arms, and is consequently the eighth former Canadian prime minister to possess arms featuring the heraldic mark. Three children of Paul Martin were also granted differenced versions of their father’s arms, all of which continue to feature the prime minister’s mark, thus demonstrating its heritable nature.

== Gallery ==
=== Personal coats of arms ===
Prime ministers John A. Macdonald and Charles Tupper both had personal coats of arms, however neither feature the heraldic mark because the symbol had not been adopted during their tenure.

Joe Clark

Pierre Trudeau

John Turner

Brian Mulroney

Kim Campbell

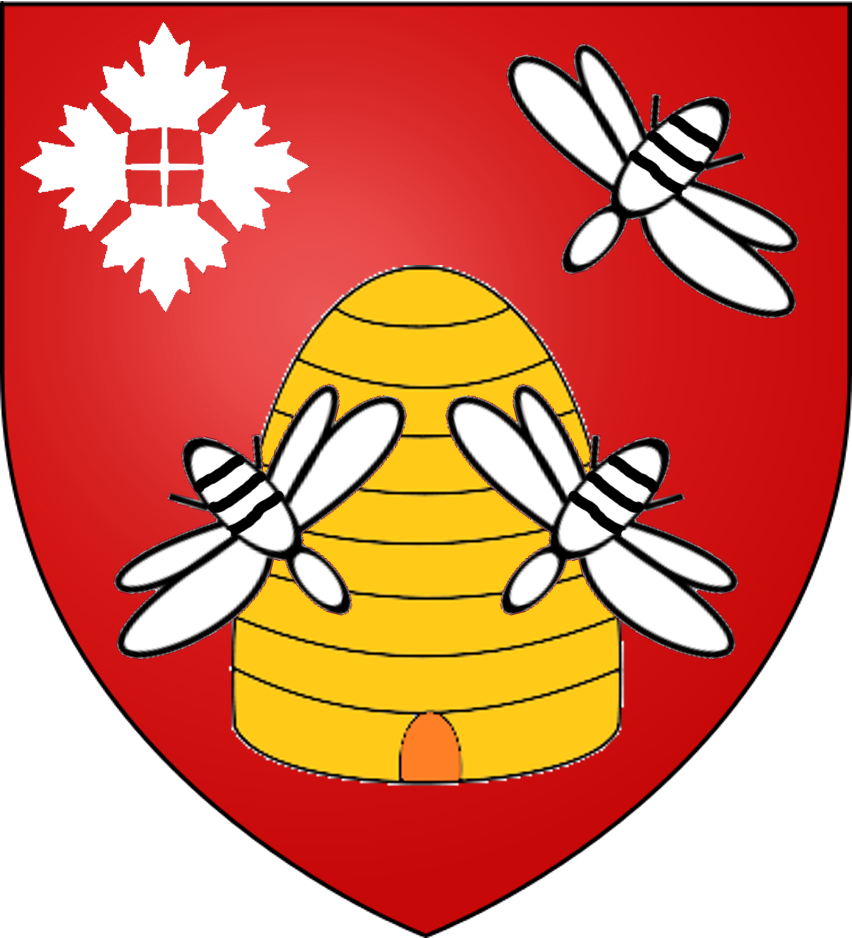
Jean Chrétien

Paul Martin
