= Percy Sparks =

Canadian manufacturer and environmentalist

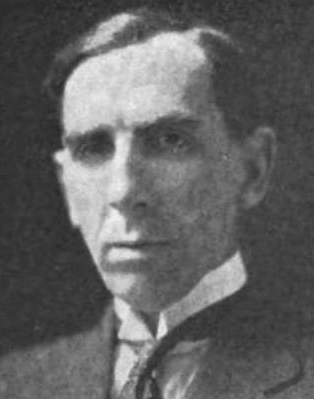
- Born: Roderick Percy Sparks; March 7, 1880; Ottawa, Canada
- Died: March 29, 1959 (aged 79); Ottawa, Canada
- Education: Ottawa Collegiate Institute
- Occupation: Manufacturer
- Spouse: Rheba Fraser (m. 1911)
- Children: 3

Roderick Percy Sparks (March 7, 1880 – March 29, 1959) was a Canadian manufacturer and environmentalist. He is widely credited with being the Father of Gatineau Park.

Born on March 7, 1880, in Ottawa, Canada, Sparks was the great grandnephew of Ottawa pioneer Nicholas Sparks. Educated at the Ottawa Public School, and the Ottawa Collegiate Institute, he was a garment manufacturer as well as president and executive committee member of various commercial associations, including the Canadian Manufacturers Association.

He married Rheba Fraser on February 11, 1911, and they had three children.

He served as the president/commodore of the Britannia Boating Club from 1910 to 1913.

== Gatineau Hills ==
The Ottawa Journal of March 30, 1959, credited Percy Sparks with being the "father of the Gatineau Park," adding that, as chairman of the Federal Woodlands Preservation League from 1937 to 1947, he "brought about the first purchase by the Dominion government of what is now […] Gatineau Park." On May 12, 1955, the same paper said that "Mr. Sparks and his associates are generally credited with 'selling' the late Prime Minister Mackenzie King the idea of setting aside a national recreation area on the outskirts of Canada's capital."

A noted conservationist, tariff expert and successful businessman, he waged battles against government corruption in the 1920s, playing a key role in the 1926 Customs Investigation, and defended workers' rights in the 1930s, helping Conservative MP Harry Stevens establish the Select Committee on Price Spreads. He also dedicated nearly a quarter century of his life to building a park in the Gatineau Hills.

As chairman of the research committee of the Federal Woodlands Preservation League, Sparks had urged the Bennett government to commission a survey of the Gatineau forests in a letter of April 3, 1935, to Interior Minister T. G. Murphy. The importance of the resulting study was acknowledged in the 1952 annual report of the Federal District Commission:

The government, having been concerned about the cutting of the forest cover in the Kingsmere area, authorized an extensive survey of this matter and the findings were published in the Lower Gatineau Woodlands Survey. [In 1938], as a result of the above-mentioned report, the Commission commenced the development of Gatineau Park by the acquisition of land.

While chairman of the League, Sparks also wrote several documents that were crucial to the creation and initial development of Gatineau Park. They include a December 13, 1937, memorandum to the office of Prime Minister King outlining a proposal for creating the park; a preliminary master plan proposal for Gatineau Park sent to the Federal District Commission on October 9, 1945; and a 1946 memorandum to the Standing Senate Committee on Tourist Traffic.

Sparks also played a central role in helping orient the park's design and development in his capacity as chairman of the Advisory Committee on Gatineau Park from 1947 to 1954. He did so by, among other things, writing the 1949 Report of the Advisory Committee on Gatineau Park and – perhaps most importantly – the 1952 Report on a Master Plan for Development of Gatineau Park (the latter being, in effect, the first comprehensive master plan for the park, though the NCC has failed to acknowledge this).

Sparks was also a member of the Advisory Committee's Parkway subcommittee which had been created to study the possibility of building a parkway through Gatineau Park. In July 1953, the subcommittee went on a fact-finding mission to Virginia's Shenandoah National Park and Tennessee's Great Smoky Mountain National Park. The recommendations made in its report were largely inspired by Shenandoah's Skyline Drive, and many of them were later implemented in Gatineau Park. The park's Étienne Brulé Lookout is a mirror image of lookouts found throughout Shenandoah.

In his last major contribution to the park, a 1956 memorandum to a joint parliamentary committee, Sparks argued that the public interest had been seriously ignored in the planning and management of Gatineau Park. He underlined that the personal, financial and political interests of area landowners exercised undue influence over park development:

All of the property owners in [the Meech Lake and Kingsmere] area have a direct financial interest in the plans of the Commission [...]. In fact it is no reflection on them to say that their interest may be in direct conflict with the public interest.

Perhaps his most eloquent vision statement for the park is to be found in the 1949 Report of the Advisory Committee on Gatineau Park:

The prime objective of this plan should be to retain throughout the main area of the park the atmosphere of the Canadian woods and preserve for all time the natural beauty of the lakes and wooded hills as an inspiration to all … While this park will serve a useful purpose as a place of recreation, bringing physical benefits, its greater purpose lies in its possibilities as a moral and spiritual force in the lives of those who visit it.

Roderick Percy Sparks died of pneumonia in Ottawa on March 29, 1959, following a holiday in Tucson, Arizona.

== Continuing influence ==
Sparks' influence continues to be evident throughout Gatineau Park, most notably in policies advocated in successive NCC master plans. The extent of that influence was acknowledged in 1950 by French urban planner Jacques Gréber in his landmark report on Canada's capital:

The Advisory Committee to the Federal District Commission on Gatineau Park, of which Mr. P. Sparks is Chairman […] are in full and enthusiastic accord with us on the possibilities of this wooded reserve, and have, in large measure, inspired our recommendations relative to practical developments of this providential asset of the Capital Region.

== Official recognition ==
As well, the NCC recognized Sparks' key contribution to the park, albeit belatedly, when it dedicated the Roderick Percy Sparks Exhibition Hall at an official ceremony in the park's visitors centre on July 8, 2005. Speaking on that occasion, Sparks' grandson, Sandy Crawley, recalled memories of his grandfather:

One of the lessons I learned from my grandfather, whom we called Pop, was that you have to fight for what you believe in. Pop understood that parks like this one don't get started on their own [...] He knew that it sometimes takes a little arm twisting to get things done. Pop also taught me when I was very young that if I was ever worried or agitated or upset, I could always go into the woods and I was surrounded by nature, which was really my best friend. He taught me that when I was four years old and it still serves me now that I'm 57. The park is a testament to that set of values and to his profound appreciation for nature.

Words from his eldest granddaughter, Ms. Michal Anne Crawley, were also spoken during the dedication ceremony:

Pop gave us an appreciation for nature and a heritage which, even if we live in cities, can never be taken away. It is in our blood. And in our family's particular blood are the Gatineau Hills, thanks to him. We hope Gatineau Park will continue to give that heritage to all who visit. It is a special place, one to be cherished and taken care of.

His grandson, Rod Crawley, also related vivid impressions of Percy Sparks:

I remember holding his hand, being led on walks along well-worn paths, made by him, listening to and witnessing the unfolding natural world. What especially struck me as a child were the animals of the forest and the relationship they have with each other, and with the forces of nature, which I was able to witness on a daily basis.

Pop built a wonderful set of swings at "Stone Acres," his farm on the Meech Lake Road. The ropes were so long we could touch the leaves of the tall maples with our toes – like flying, if only for an instant.

He built a dam on one of the creeks that ran through the property and created a small pond on which we skated with joy each winter. He built a barn, and chicken house. The barn had a tin roof. To be inside it, and hear the rain on the tin roof was one of our coziest feelings.
