= Princeton, Ontario =

Coordinates: 43.171°N 80.526°W

Location of Princeton in Ontario

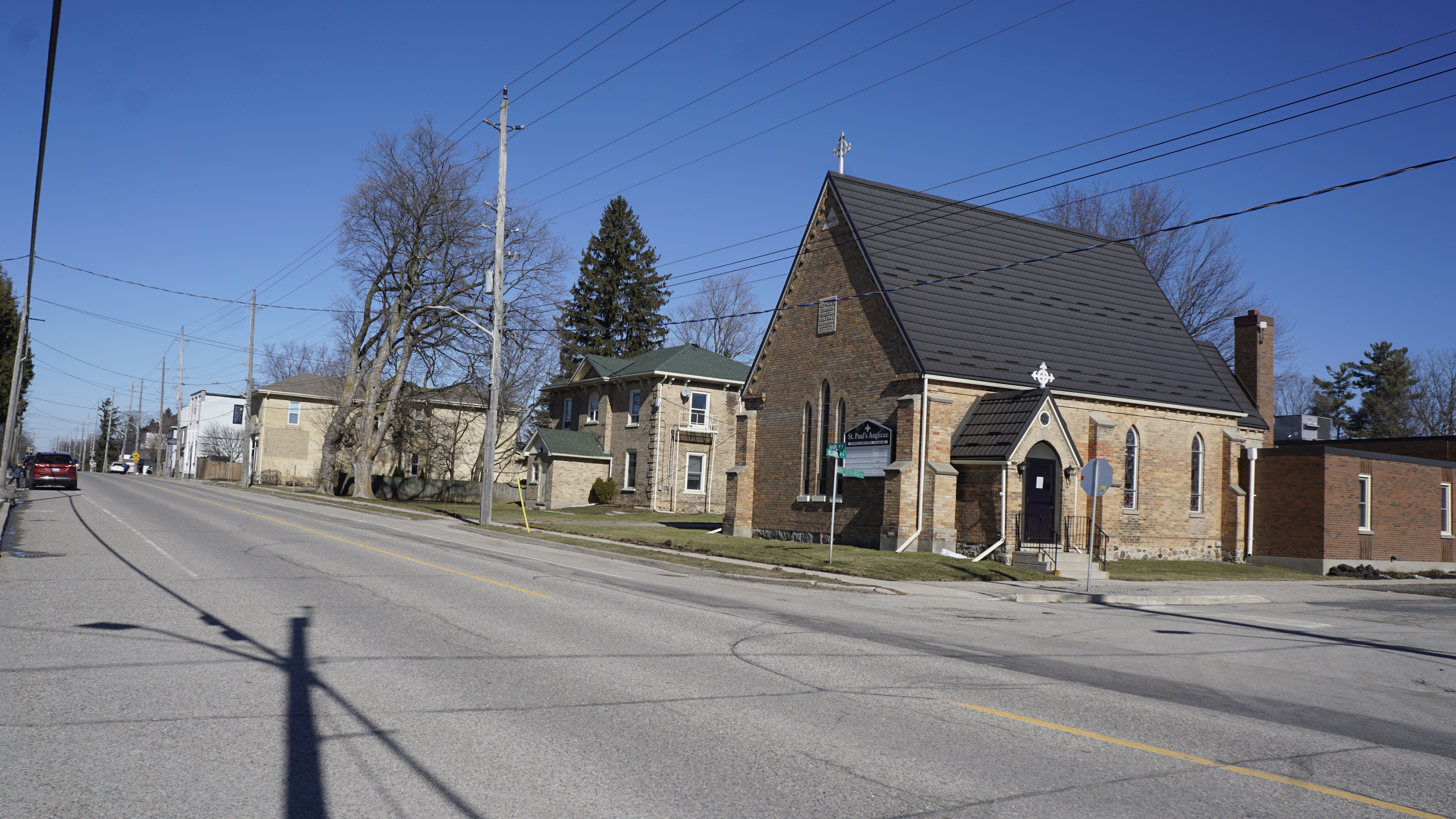
Main Street in Princeton

Princeton is a community in Blandford-Blenheim, which is part of Oxford County, Ontario, Canada. .

Princeton is home to the Van Besien site, a significant archaeological site representing the Glen Meyer phase of the Ontario Iroquoian tradition. Excavated primarily between 1971 and 1972 by Dr. William Noble of McMaster University, the site dates to approximately 900–1100 AD. The village expanded over time from 1.2 to 3.0 acres and featured multiple longhouses protected by a defensive palisade. Findings at the site provided early evidence of maize cultivation and sedentary village life in the Oxford County region. A 1978 news report popularized the site's discovery during local construction, but it had been a subject of academic study since 1969.

The Princeton Public Library is a branch of the Oxford Public Library. Princeton also has 3 churches, 1 community park (parking off of Elgin ST west), a museum (in the same building as the public library located at 25 main st S), a community Centre (35 main st S), a post office (24 main st N) and has multiple small businesses

The population is about 500 people.

Thomas Leopold "Carbide" Willson, who invented an economical method of mass-producing calcium carbide, was born on a farm near Princeton, Ontario, in 1860.
