= Royal Canadian Mounted Police Protective Policing =

Protective services by the RCMP

The Protective Policing Service (French: Services de police de protection), operated by the Royal Canadian Mounted Police, provides security details for domestic and foreign VIPs when abroad.

== History ==
In October 2022, concerns were raised that the RCMP has not recruited enough officers to provide close protection work, undermining RCMP's capabilities to protect VIPs.

Under a 2022-23 Departmental Plan, the RCMP PPS will move to a centralized model to provide enhanced oversight/compliance.

In May 2023, the RCMP is given more funding to establish more close protection units for politicians, depending on risk assessment.

== Organisation ==
PPS operations consist of RCMP officers, assisted by civilian and public servants who specialise in intelligence analysis, geospatial analysis and technological expertise.

A number of RCMP close protection units include the Governor General Protective Detail, the Prime Minister Protective Detail and the Divisional Protective Services.

== Duties ==
RCMP officers in PPS operations are responsible for protecting the following VIPs:

- Royal Family (when in Canada)
- Canadian Governor General
- Prime Minister.
- Members of Parliament and Senators
- Foreign diplomats in Canada,
- Supreme, Federal Court and Federal Court of Appeal justices
- Other persons designated by Minister of Public Safety as protected persons.

== Training ==
Prospective RCMP officers are placed under the National Close Protection Officer Course as of March 2022.

== Provincial counterparts ==
Many provinces have a similar organization that is responsible for the protection of the provincial Lieutenant-Governor, the Premier, other members of the provincial cabinet, and members of the judiciary.

- Alberta: Alberta Sheriffs Branch
- Newfoundland and Labrador: Royal Newfoundland Constabulary
- Ontario: Ontario Provincial Police
- Quebec: Sûreté du Québec
- Quebec also have protection for ministers, opposition leaders and other high level officials by the DPP (Direction de la Protection des Personalités) which is a division of the MSP (Ministère de la Sécurité Publique du Québec)

== See also ==
- United States Secret Service#Other U.S. federal law enforcement agencies
