= Reluctant Nation =

- Genre: Docudrama
- Written by: Eric Koch; Melwyn Breen
- Starring: Tom Harvey; Arch McDonnell
- Country of origin: Canada
- Original language: English
- No. of seasons: 1

Production
- Executive producer: Eric Koch
- Producer: Melwyn Breen
- Running time: 30 minutes

Original release
- Network: CBC Television
- Release: 15 September – 20 October 1966

Reluctant Nation is a Canadian historical docudrama television miniseries that aired on CBC Television in 1966.

== Premise ==
This series was produced as a Canadian Centennial project, featuring dramatic portrayals of historical Canadian leaders who are interviewed in the format of contemporary television journalism. This public affairs style highlighted concerns which faced the early Canadian Confederation such as dealings with the United States and Europe, dealings among Canadian provinces and the role of francophones in the new nation.

John Saywell of York University was a series consultant.

== Cast ==
- Arch McDonnell as a reporter
- Tom Harvey as a reporter
- Antony Parr as Andrew George Blair
- Claude Bede as William Stevens Fielding
- Jack Creley as Wilfrid Laurier
- Robert Christie as John A. Macdonald
- Robert Goodier as Honoré Mercier
- Paul Kligman as Oliver Mowat
- E. M. Margolese as John Norquay
- Norman Welsh as Goldwin Smith
- William Osler as William Van Horne

== Scheduling ==
This half-hour series was broadcast on Thursdays at 10:30 p.m. (Eastern time) from 15 September to 20 October 1966.
