= Gatineau Park =

Federal park in Gatineau, Quebec

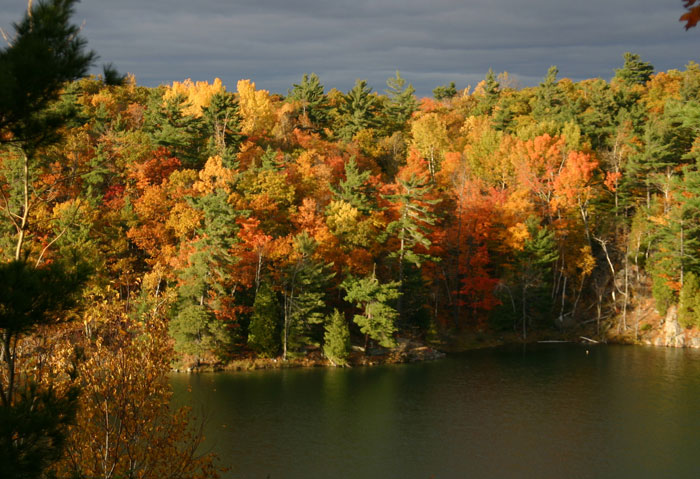
- Pink Lake at the end of October
- Interactive map of Gatineau Park
- Location: Gatineau / Les Collines-de-l'Outaouais Regional County Municipality, Quebec, Canada
- Nearest city: Gatineau
- Coordinates: 45°35′N 76°00′W
- Area: 361.31 km^{2} (139.50 sq mi)
- Established: 1938
- Governing body: National Capital Commission
- Website: ncc-ccn.gc.ca/places/gatineau-park

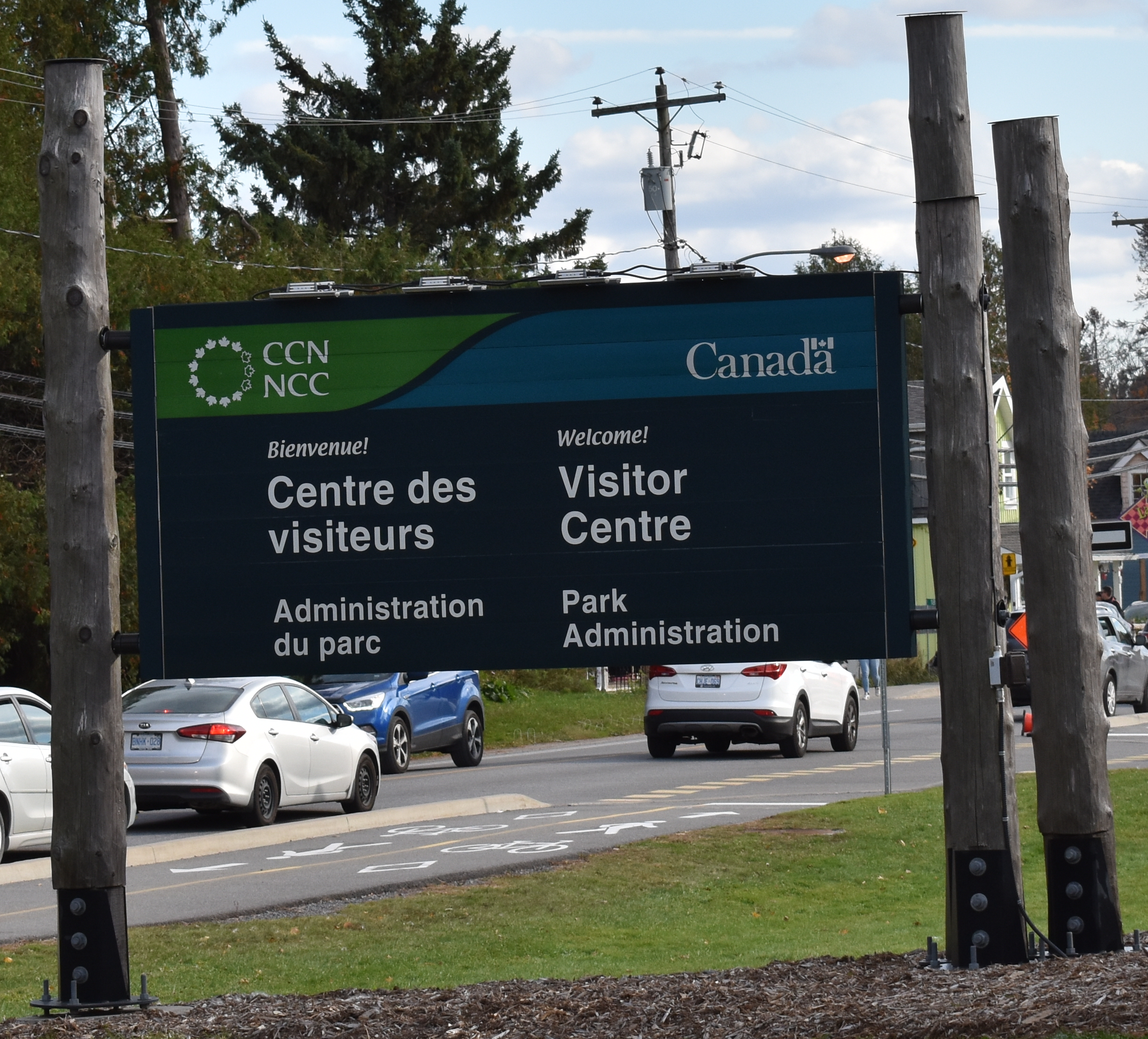
Gatineau Park Visitor Centre sign

Gatineau Park (French: Parc de la Gatineau) is a federal park located in the Outaouais region of Quebec, Canada. Administered by the National Capital Commission as part of the National Capital Region, Gatineau Park is a 361 square kilometres (139 mi^{2}) wedge of land extending north and west from the city of Gatineau. With a perimeter of 179.2 kilometres (111.3 mi), the park includes parts of the municipalities of Chelsea, Pontiac, La Pêche, and the City of Gatineau. The main entrance to the park is 4 kilometres (2.5 mi) north of downtown Ottawa, Ontario.

The park's area has a long history of human inhabitation and usage predating the arrival of European settlers. Its more recent pre-park history includes various forms of human exploitation such as farming, logging, hunting, and industrial activity. The idea of creating a park in the Gatineau Hills for recreational purposes was proposed as early as 1903. In 1938 money was allotted for the acquisition of Gatineau woodlands (for preservation) and the construction of a parkway.

The Government of Canada maintains a conference centre at Meech Lake, known as Willson House, the site of meetings leading to a failed attempt to reform Canada's Constitution in 1987, the Meech Lake Accord.

There are significant ongoing controversies about the administration of the park, including its status as the only federal park that is not part of the national parks system, the existence and construction of private residences inside it, residents' extensive violation of shoreline protection bylaws at Meech Lake, and changes to its boundaries without the knowledge of parliament. For instance, inspection reports carried out by the Municipality of Chelsea in 2013 and 2015 confirm that 119 structures have been built without permit at Meech Lake, and that 80% of Meech Lake residents whose properties were inspected continue to violate county bylaw MRC 137-09 several years after it was adopted.

== History and politics ==
Although advocated by Dominion Parks Commissioner James Harkin to be the first national park in Quebec, it remains the only federal park that is not a national park, a situation that has direct repercussions on its ecology, boundaries, and land mass.

Created in 1938, Gatineau is the only federal park not protected by the National Parks Act, largely as a result of former Prime Minister William Lyon Mackenzie King's caution, fear of criticism, and desire for privacy.

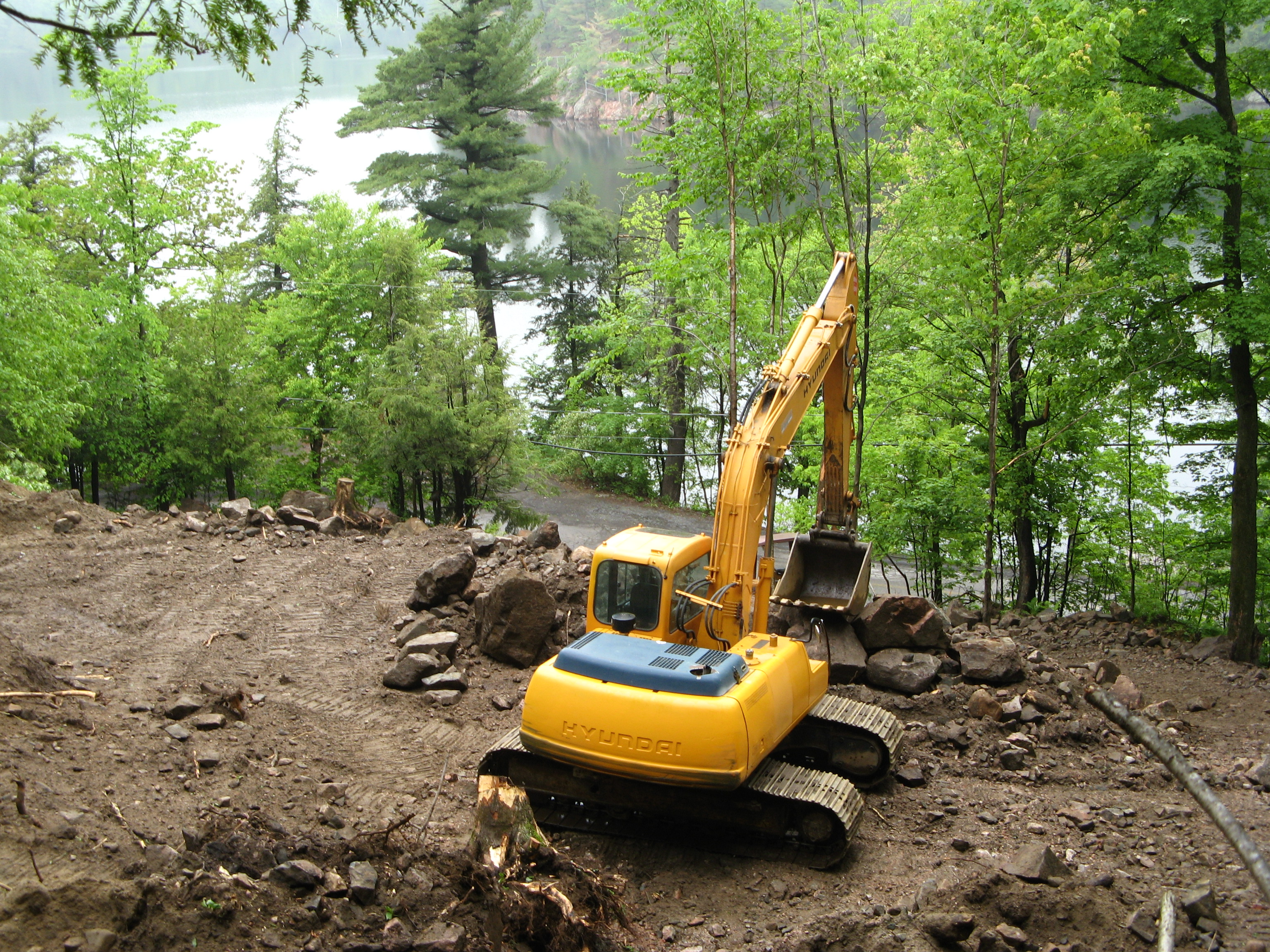
NCC allows shoreline construction at Meech Lake, 2008

Gatineau Park was to be the first national park created by the first parks service in the world, the Dominion Parks Branch.

On December 3, 1913, Dominion Parks Commissioner James B. Harkin wrote to Deputy Minister of the Interior William Cory, arguing that Gatineau Park should be the first major eastern national park in a broader nationwide parks system. Although nine St. Lawrence islands had been reserved for park purposes in 1904, they were not formally constituted as a Dominion park until December 1914. Harkin wrote that:

"The East has no national parks like those in the Rockies, and it is proposed that the country develop a broader scheme of parks than exists in any other country […] Bringing into effect the proposed Gatineau Park […] would, I think, most easily commence this scheme."

A few months later, on Cory's suggestion, Harkin wrote Quebec Minister of Mines and Forests Charles Devlin inquiring whether he would help establish a national park in the Gatineau district. Although provincial officials wrote back that the matter would receive their minister's immediate attention, Devlin died before he could follow up on Harkin's request, and no further response was ever received. With the First World War intervening shortly thereafter, the government of Canada had to tend to more pressing matters.

On April 7, 1927, the idea of creating a Gatineau national park was again raised in the House of Commons, where MPs considered a bill to create the Federal District Commission, which would build parks and parkways on both sides of the Ottawa River. During debate, however, Conservative MP John Edwards accused Prime Minister King of wanting to create a park around his Kingsmere property and ease access to it by building a parkway. Though he denied the charge, the criticism would shape King's subsequent decisions regarding the park.

It would take another eleven years for the park to be created in embryonic form on July 1, 1938, as a result of efforts by Percy Sparks of the Federal Woodlands Preservation League. By choosing to create the park through gradual property acquisition, the King government allowed private property to continue existing in Gatineau Park—a situation that has prevented the park from becoming a national park.

Today, the National Capital Commission manages the park, along with all federal lands and buildings in Canada's National Capital Region. Its policies on park boundaries, land management and ownership, as well as on residential construction in the park, have been the subject of controversy.

To address these issues, several private members' bills have been introduced in the Senate and House of Commons since 2005. The federal government also tabled its own Gatineau Park legislation in June 2009 and April 2010. None of the bills tabled so far has been enacted into law.

The latest government legislation on the subject, Bill C-20, was reported back to the House of Commons on November 15, 2010. However, it died on the Order Paper before it could be given third reading when the 40th parliament was dissolved.

In the fall of 2010, a controversy broke out in the press pertaining to the rehabilitation of Trail no. 1 in Gatineau Park. According to published reports, the contractor hired by the NCC had laced the trail with broken glass and other debris; the NCC reacted to this news by hiring an engineering firm to study the problem. Its report concluded that garbage spread along the trail was within acceptable standards, a conclusion that park advocates met with scepticism. The NCC also confirmed staff for the contractor were not certified in the maintenance of summer trails in the park, as required by their contract.

More recently, on April 30, 2014, the Conservative government defeated the latest private member's bill pertaining to Gatineau Park, a bill that had been tabled by Hull-Aylmer NDP MP Nycole Turmel. The Conservatives argued that the bill (C-565) was too restrictive, since it applied only to Gatineau Park and not to other green space in the National Capital Region. They also said they voted against it because they intended to re-introduce their own legislation in the near term. According to park activists, C-565, though seriously flawed, should have been sent to committee for study and amendment.

Building on the work of the predecessor Federal Woodlands Preservation League, the modern-day New Woodlands Preservation League and its Gatineau Park Protection Committee advocate greater public access to the park while opposing residential development inside it.

== Sites and activities ==
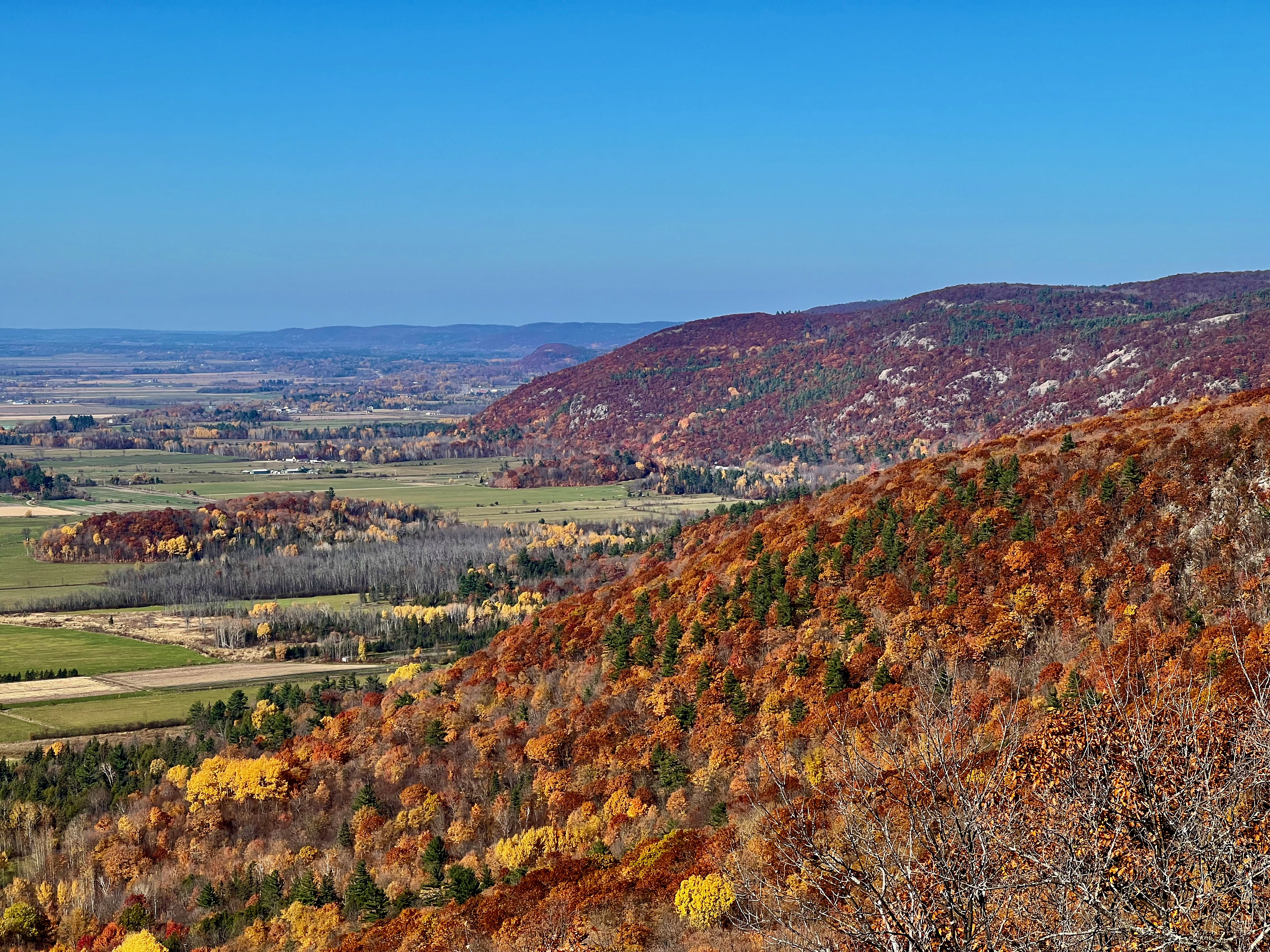
Ottawa Valley and Gatineau Hills from Champlain lookout in Gatineau Park

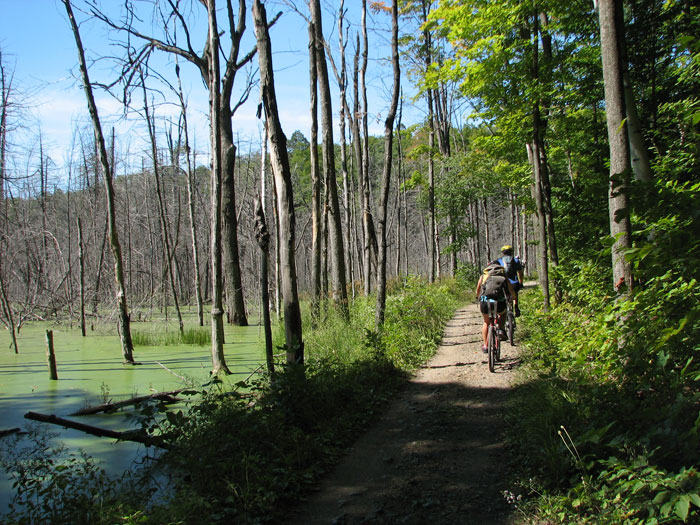
Biking along one of the many trails in Gatineau Park

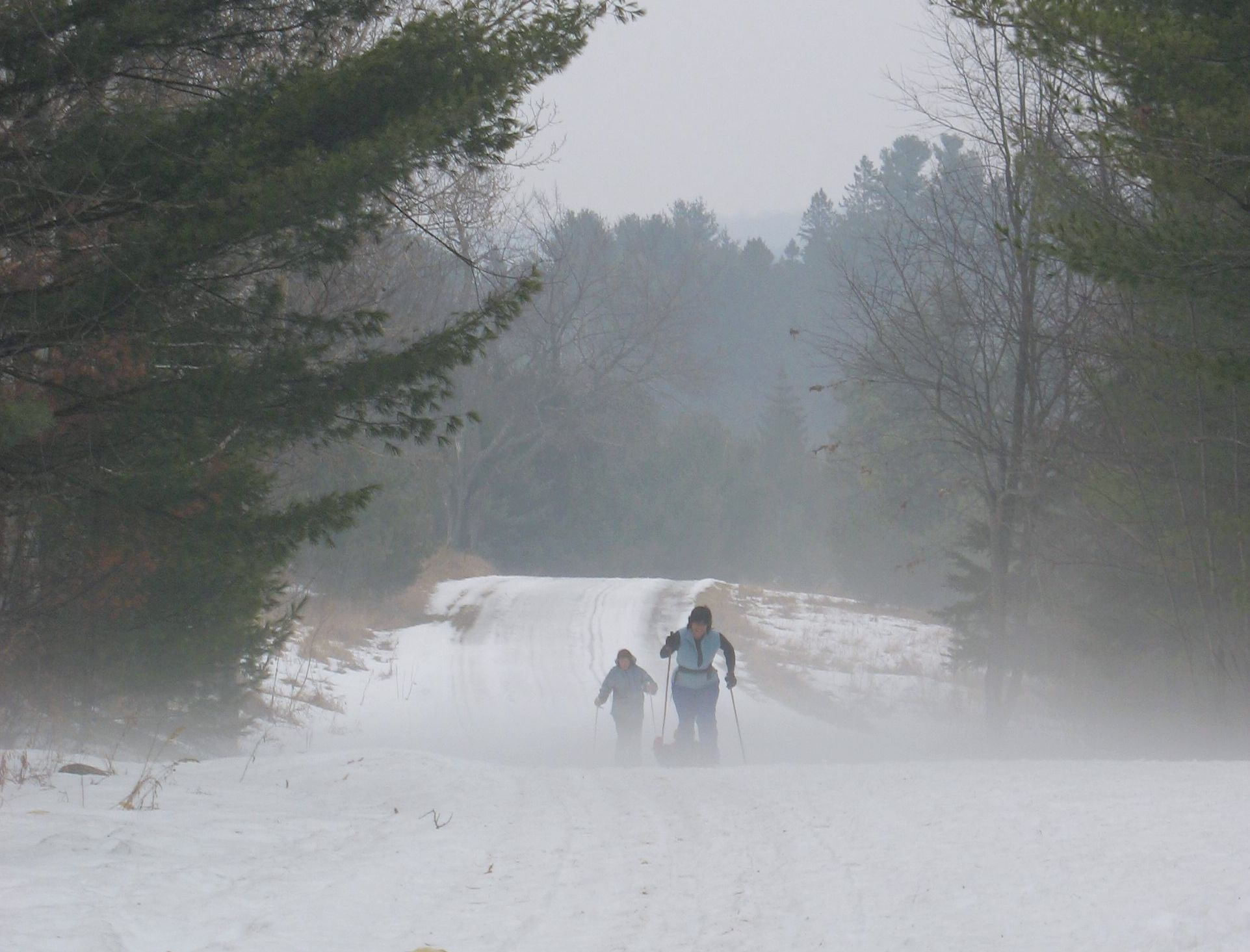
Cross country ski trail in Gatineau Park

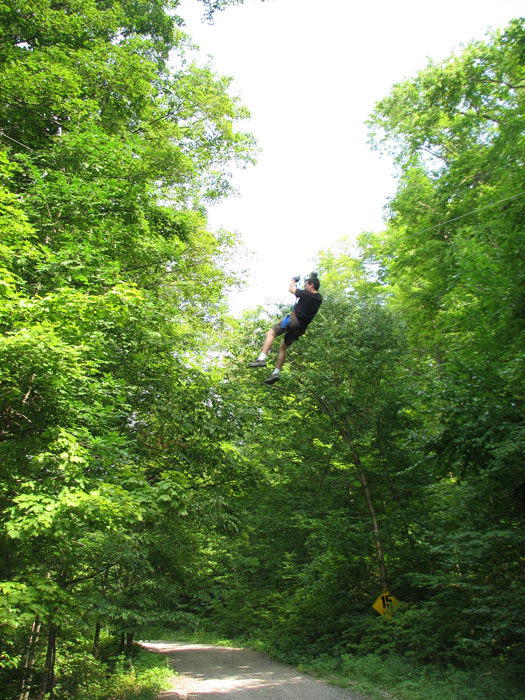
Ziplining in the park

Gatineau Park is a recreational destination offering public facilities including beaches, campgrounds, picnic areas, trails, and parkways. There are 165 km (103 mi) of hiking trails and 90 km (56 mi) of trails for mountain bikes and the Trans Canada Trail passes through the park. The park is also popular with cyclists where many routes are quite steep and very demanding on legs, heart and lungs.

Beaches are located at Meech Lake, Lac Phillipe and La Pêche Lake. While no camping is allowed at Meech Lake, there are campgrounds at the other two lakes. All three lakes are open to canoeists, but gas motor boats are only allowed at Meech Lake due to the presence of many private properties.

Cross-country skiing is one of the park's main recreational activities. Nearly 200 km (120 mi) of cross-country trails criss-cross the park, which hosts the annual Gatineau Loppet ski race (formerly known as Keskinada Loppet). Downhill skiing and snowboarding are engaged in at Camp Fortune.

During the summer months, Camp Fortune offers an aerial experience including ziplines and treetop obstacles.

Although the practice is not formally permitted in the park, some of the more secluded corners are popular with nudists. In particular there is an unofficial nude beach that has been in use since the late 1930s. Located northwest of parking lot P11 on trail 36, the beach is extensively used by members of Ottawa's gay community.

The Mackenzie King Estate, the former summer home of William Lyon Mackenzie King, the tenth Prime Minister of Canada, with its 231 hectares of landscaped green space, is located south of Kingsmere Lake. The cottages, including Kingswood and the primary residence, Moorside, were recently restored and now feature interactive exhibits about Mackenzie King's era. There is a café and tea room at the estate. The estate also features the picturesque collection of stone ruins and a small waterfall that runs down the escarpment near Moorside. Mackenzie King donated his estate to the people of Canada at his death in 1950.

Located at Kingsmere, the official residence of the Speaker of the House of Commons of Canada since 1955, and known as The Farm, was part of William Lyon Mackenzie King's estate. This rural property consists of a renovated farmhouse and five outbuildings surrounded by 1.74 hectares (4 acres) of fields and forests. The residence is closed to the public, but a virtual tour is available.

Also located inside the park is the Prime Minister of Canada's country retreat and official summer residence Harrington Lake, also called Lac Mousseau.

At the end of the Gatineau Parkway, Champlain lookout provides views of the Ottawa Valley from high atop the Eardley Escarpment. When leaves change colour in fall, tourists and locals are drawn to the park's lookouts, roads, and pathways to enjoy the autumn scenery.

Pink Lake is a meromictic lake found in the park. Tiny algae in the lake give it a bright green colour. The lake's name comes from the Pink family who originally owned property in the area. The park includes many other lakes.

King Mountain, a prominent peak along the Eardley Escarpment at approximately 350 m (1,150 ft), was the first triangulation point in Canada. The mountain's unique positioning provides an interesting spectrum of vegetation ranging from evergreen and deciduous forests to windswept savannas. The mountain is also home to a number of trees which are rare in the area, including some that are nearly 600 years old. For many years, a 30-foot-high (9.1 m) red-coloured cedar cross was located on top of King Mountain. Originally erected by Old Chelsea's parish priest, Father Maguire, it could be seen for miles around. It eventually rotted and fell over the cliff.

== Wildlife ==
Gatineau Park provides habitat for many species of birds including the pileated woodpecker and common loon. Turkey vultures and migrating hawks may be observed soaring on the thermals above the Eardley Escarpment. The park is also home to a large population of beavers and white-tailed deer, as well as black bears and two wolf packs in the more remote sections.

== See also ==
- Category:Lakes of Outaouais
- List of National Parks of Canada
