= Jack Creley =

American-Canadian actor (1926–2004)

- Born: Jack Craig Creley; March 6, 1926; Chicago, Illinois, United States
- Died: March 10, 2004 (aged 78); Toronto, Ontario, Canada
- Education: Dramatic Workshop
- Occupation: Actor
- Military career
- Allegiance: United States
- Branch: United States Army
- Conflicts: World War II; Battle of Okinawa

Jack Creley (March 6, 1926 – March 10, 2004) was an American-Canadian actor of stage, film, and television.

== Early years ==
Creley was born in Chicago, Illinois, on March 6, 1926. During the Great Depression, his family moved to California, where he acted in amateur theatre as a teenager, until he was old enough to enlist in the United States Army late in World War II. He was shot in the shoulder during the Battle of Okinawa, and spent the rest of his life telling the story that he knew he was destined to become an actor when he realized he was responding to the injury like a character in a John Wayne film.

After the end of the war, he went to New York City to study acting under Erwin Piscator at the Dramatic Workshop, where he was a classmate of Harry Belafonte, Tony Curtis and Rod Steiger. He moved to Montreal in 1951 to take a job with the Mountain Theatre Company, and remained there until 1954, when he moved to Toronto. Soon after moving to Toronto, he met David Smith, who would be his partner for the remainder of his life.

== Career ==
In Toronto, he acted on stage, including frequent performances at the Stratford Festival, and often appeared in CBC Television anthology series, including Scope, Playbill, CBC Summer Theatre, Encounter, Folio, Startime, Horizon, Playdate and several Wayne and Shuster sketches, as well as performing in cabaret shows.

In 1956, Creley starred in the Canadian production of Salad Days, and in 1958 he starred in the Canadian production of Visit to a Small Planet. In 1960, he played two roles at the Stratford Festival, as Lord Capulet in Romeo and Juliet and as King Philip in King John.

Creley had his first major film role in 1961, in the Western film The Canadians. After completing a run as Holofernes in a Stratford Festival production of Love's Labour's Lost that summer, he returned to New York to appear in a Broadway production of A Man for All Seasons as Cardinal Wolsey. After completing his run in New York, he appeared in a Stratford Festival production of The Gondoliers, and then went to London to appear alongside Corinne Conley, Dave Broadfoot, Eric House and Eric Christmas in the musical revue Clap Hands at the Hammersmith Theatre. Following the end of that show's run, most of the cast returned to Canada, although Creley remained in London to take a role as National Security Advisor Mr. Staines in the film Dr. Strangelove.

After returning to Canada, he appeared in productions of Edward Albee's The Zoo Story and Anton Chekhov's Summer in the Country. During this time, he also became a popular voice-over artist for television commercials, recording at least 18 commercial spots in 1965 and 1966. He directed a musical revue, The Decline and Fall of the Entire World As Seen Through the Eyes of Cole Porter, in 1965 and 1966, and when he stepped in for several shows in the absence of lead performer Louis Negin, it was his first time singing on stage since the end of Clap Hands in 1963.

In 1966, he appeared as Prime Minister Wilfrid Laurier in the CBC Television miniseries Reluctant Nation, and in 1969 he appeared in the television series Strange Paradise as Laslo Thaxton.

In 1970, he starred in the musical Oh, Coward! at Theatre in the Dell, alongside Patricia Collins and Gordon Thomson. Charles Pope from the Toronto Star called his performance "magnificent".

In 1972 he had his second and final Broadway role, appearing in a production of There's One in Every Marriage as Roubillon, and in 1974 he had his last role at Stratford in a production of The Imaginary Invalid. In this era, he began to appear more often in film and television roles, most notably in the film Videodrome and the television sitcom Snow Job. His final role was a guest appearance on E.N.G. in 1990.

== Personal life ==
Creley and Smith shared ownership of an antique store, The Green Dolphin, beginning in 1955, and later of a clothing store, Mr. Smith. They also had a widespread reputation among actors as being excellent hosts of parties; performers such as Vivien Leigh, Sean Connery, Richard Burton, Bea Arthur, and Billy Dee Williams were frequent houseguests of the couple.

=== Illness and death ===
Late in life, Creley suffered two strokes, and began to develop aphasia. He died on March 10, 2004, in Toronto.

== Filmography ==
=== Film ===
Year	Title	Role	Notes
1961	The Canadians	Greer	
1964	Dr. Strangelove	NSA Staines	
1966	The Marvel Super Heroes	Thor/ Don Blake (Voice)	
1969	Change of Mind	Bill Chambers	
1970	The Man Who Wanted to Live Forever	Dr. George Simmons	ABC Movie of the Week
1971	The Crowd Inside	Wealthy older man	
1971	The Reincarnate	Everett Julian	
1974	Alien Thunder	Arthur Ballentyne	
1974	A Star Is Lost!	Billy Norman	
1977	Welcome to Blood City	Webb	
1977	Rituals	Jesse	
1981	Tulips	Florist	Uncredited
1982	If You Could See What I Hear	Dean Franklin	
1983	Videodrome	Brian O'Blivion	
1983	The Magic Show	Shumway	
1983	All in Good Taste	Lou Melnik	
1986	Police Academy 3: Back in Training	Mr. Bellows	
1986	Spearfield's Daughter	Stephen Jensen	
1987	Police Academy 4: Citizens on Patrol	Judge	
