= Meech Lake =

Lake located within Gatineau Park of Gatineau, Quebec, Canada

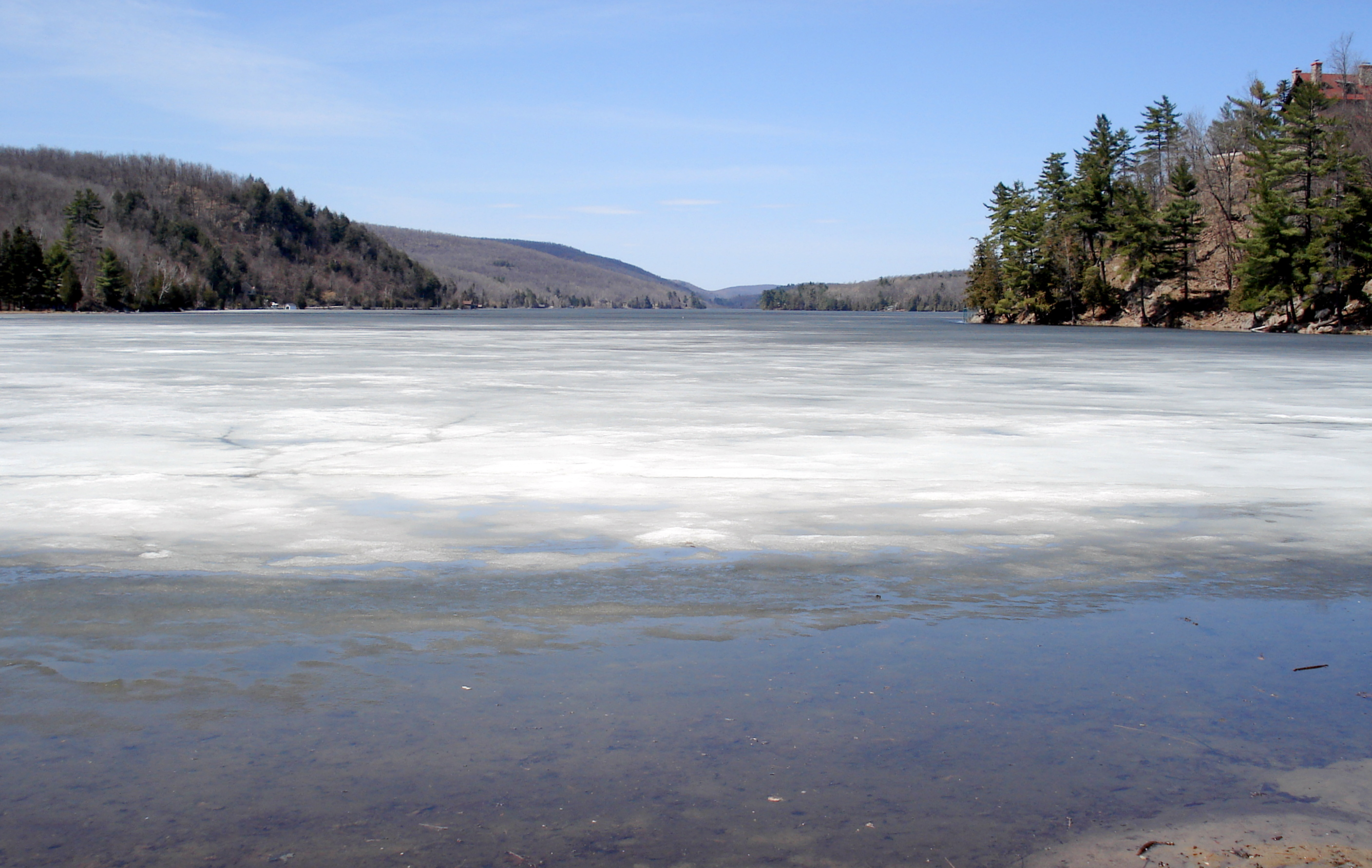
- View from O'Brien Beach at the south-east end of the lake in early spring

- Location within Quebec
- Location: Chelsea, Les Collines-de-l'Outaouais Regional County Municipality, Quebec
- Coordinates: 45°32′06″N 75°53′21″W
- Basin countries: Canada

Meech Lake (French: Lac Meech) is located within Gatineau Park in the Municipality of Chelsea, Quebec, Canada, about 20 km northwest of Gatineau. The lake was named after Reverend Asa Meech, an early settler in the area.

Canadian inventor Thomas "Carbide" Willson built a summer home on the lake in the early 1900s. In 1981, the Willson House was converted into a government conference centre. Its most notable use was in 1987, as the site of meetings on the Meech Lake Accord (which proposed the overhauling of Canada's constitution) between the provincial premiers and then-Prime Minister Brian Mulroney.

The lake is a multi-use recreational area for open water swimming, paddling, snowshoeing, nordic skiing, and hiking, and hosts the annual Meech Lake Triathlon. Since at least the early 1970s, secluded areas of the lake near the Carbide Willson Ruins have also been used informally for nude sunbathing and swimming, and the area has a documented history as a gathering place for Ottawa's gay community, subject to recurring disputes over enforcement and National Capital Commission (NCC) policy through the 2010s.

== Etymology ==
The lake was named after Reverend Asa Meech, an early settler in the area. In 1931, the Geographic Board of Canada recorded the name as "Meach Lake." Following a 1951 petition by Marion Meech, the Commission de toponymie du Québec later corrected the spelling in 1978, and the name "Lac Meech" was formally adopted at the request of the director of Gatineau Park.

== History ==
=== Thomas "Carbide" Willson and the mill ruins ===
Thomas "Carbide" Willson, an inventor, began acquiring lakefront property at Meech Lake in the early 1900s and built a dam, generating station, and chemical works at the site, including an early phosphoric acid condensation plant, between 1911 and 1913. Willson died in 1915. By the 1970s, the mill ruins had become a well-known local landmark, and a 1988 history of the park noted that, although discouraged by the NCC, they had become a favoured retreat for nude sunbathers. In 1980 and again in 1999, NCC officials stated that promoting the ruins as a heritage attraction was intended to discourage the site's use by nudists.

=== The Meech Lake Accord (1987) ===
In 1981, Willson's former summer home on the lake was converted into a government conference centre. In 1987, the house was the site of negotiations between Prime Minister Brian Mulroney and the ten provincial premiers over the Meech Lake Accord, a package of proposed amendments to Canada's constitution intended to secure Quebec's agreement to the 1982 constitutional amendments. The accord was never ratified, and its failure is widely credited with contributing to a resurgence of Quebec sovereigntist sentiment.

=== Naturist and LGBTQ community history ===
The National Capital Commission's acquisition of lakefront properties beginning in 1963 and 1964 led to Meech Lake being opened up to public access in 1970, and press coverage from the same period documents both resident complaints about the sudden increase in visitors and the earliest recorded disputes over nude sunbathing near the mill ruins. Eighteen people were arrested near the site for public nudity in August 1971; the charges were later dismissed, and a follow-up report the next year noted the area had "been regularly frequented by nudists for many years," indicating the practice predated the arrests.

By the late 1970s the ruins were locally well known as a nudist gathering place. A regular interviewed in 1980, who had been visiting for six years, described the draw as the area's peacefulness and the fact that "many of his friends, most of them gay," also frequented the site. That same year, an NCC official stated that plans to develop the ruins into a heritage tourist attraction were intended to discourage nudists from continuing to use the site.

Complaints from the West Hull municipal council and a competing request from the Federation of Quebec Naturists for an officially designated site led the NCC, in 1984, to introduce a regulation tolerating nude sunbathing in a defined area around the ruins; attendance was reported as high as 250 people on summer weekends. A Quebec court ruled the following year that the NCC lacked authority to enforce its own nudity bylaw, finding that only the federal Criminal Code's public nudity provision applied, and the NCC did not appeal. The commission reversed its approach again in April 1986, announcing that nude sunbathing would no longer be tolerated anywhere in the park; a planned brochure encouraging park visitors to lay charges against nude sunbathers was later scrapped following public criticism.

The site continued to be used by nudists, and increasingly by members of Ottawa's gay community, through the 1980s and 1990s. Ottawa's gay press documented organized outings to the lake by groups such as GO-NUTS (Gay Ottawa Nudists Under the Sun) beginning in the mid-1990s, and the location appeared in national and international gay travel guides during the same period.

Organized naturists, describing themselves as marking sixty years of use of the site, petitioned the NCC in 1999 to permit nude sunbathing and to allow signage warning other visitors of the practice. The NCC rejected both requests, stating that public nudity was governed by the Criminal Code and that it lacked authority to authorize the activity.

In August 2010, a man was reported to have repeatedly harassed beachgoers with homophobic slurs and threats of violence. The following September, plainclothes police from the MRC des Collines conducted a coordinated operation, described by police as involving cooperation with the NCC, that resulted in the arrest of several men for public nudity near the site; officers cited public complaints and partly justified the operation by referencing the recent murder of a young woman roughly 13 kilometres away, a connection Carleton University professor Patrizia Gentile disputed. Gentile, co-author of The Canadian War on Queers: National Security as Sexual Regulation, characterized the operation as consistent with a longer pattern of police using unrelated incidents to justify action against gay men's use of public parks. A similar operation in August 2012 resulted in further arrests.

== Recreation ==
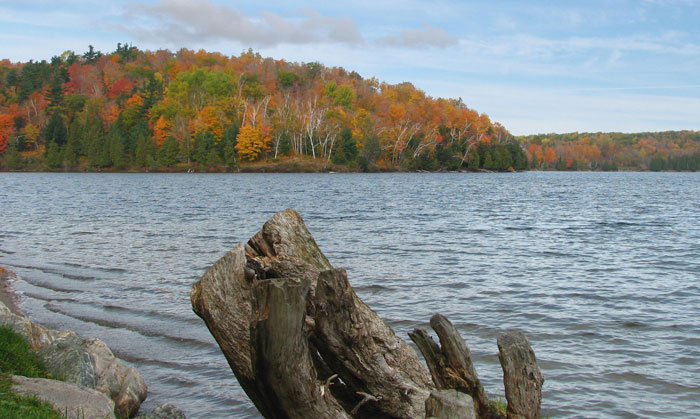
Meech Lake from Blanchet Beach on the western shore

Meech Lake has two supervised beaches, Blanchet and O'Brien, both with washrooms, change rooms, and picnic tables. It also has a boat launch for non-motorized craft, the McCloskey Boat Launch, near parking lot P12; there is no rental service at the lake, so you need to bring your own canoe, kayak, or paddleboard. Access to Meech Lake is by bike, car, or the Gatineau Park Shuttle. Parking is available at lots P11 (O'Brien Beach), P12 for the boat launch, and P13 (Blanchet Beach).

Gatineau Park Trail 36 runs along the east side of the lake and provides access to the Carbide Willson Ruins and the historic queer and naturist spots. Open water swimming is allowed at Meech from May to October, following successful pilot projects in 2021 and 2022.

== Environmental Issues ==
In 1988, a study conducted for the NCC confirmed that Meech Lake residents are responsible for most of the human-produced phosphorus flowing into the lake, i.e., 70.2%, whereas visitors only account for 29.8%. Phosphorus, in excessive amounts is responsible for the proliferation of blue-green algae, a problem that has afflicted the lake in recent years.
